= 2011–12 Ottawa Senators season =

NHL hockey team season

2011–12 Ottawa Senators
- Division: 2nd Northeast
- Conference: 8th Eastern
- 2011–12 record: 41–31–10
- Home record: 20–17–4
- Road record: 21–14–6
- Goals for: 249
- Goals against: 240

Team information
- General manager: Bryan Murray
- Coach: Paul MacLean
- Captain: Daniel Alfredsson
- Alternate captains: Chris Phillips; Jason Spezza
- Arena: Scotiabank Place
- Average attendance: 19,356

Team leaders
- Goals: Milan Michalek (35)
- Assists: Erik Karlsson (59)
- Points: Jason Spezza (84)
- Penalty minutes: Zenon Konopka (193)
- Plus/minus: Filip Kuba (+26)
- Wins: Craig Anderson (33)
- Goals against average: Robin Lehner (2.01)

The 2011–12 Ottawa Senators season was the 20th season of the Ottawa Senators of the National Hockey League (NHL). It was considered a rebuilding season for the Senators after an off-season of high player personnel turnover and the hiring of a new head coach. Although the Senators were not expected to make the playoffs, the team qualified eighth. The team lost, however, in the first round to the first-place New York Rangers, although they took the series to a seventh game. Three Senators were nominated for NHL awards: captain Daniel Alfredsson for the Bill Masterton Memorial Trophy, Erik Karlsson for the James Norris Trophy and Head Coach Paul MacLean for the Jack Adams Award. The Senators hosted the NHL All-Star Game and its festivities. Alfredsson was named captain of one of the teams and five Senators played in the Game.

== Team business ==
On May 19, 2011, the Ottawa Senators were awarded the Ottawa United Way Community Builder of the Year Award for over $60 million in charitable fund-raising in the past ten years, support of youth hockey and the founding of the "Do It For Daron" initiative for mental health in honour of Daron Richardson, the daughter of Ottawa Senators assistant coach Luke Richardson, who took her own life in November 2010. On May 20, 2011, the Senators announced the "Rink of Dreams" project to build an outdoor skating rink at Ottawa City Hall. The rink is to cost $1.25 million, $1 million of which would be funded by the Senators Foundation charity.

In December 2011, the Senators officially announced the replacement of the scoreboard at Scotiabank Place. The old scoreboard dated from 1996, and its replacement had been rumoured in the media since the time of the announcement that the All-Star Game would be played in the arena. The new scoreboard, to be supplied by Panasonic, uses four high-definition video screens, plus two LED "rings", one above the scoreboards and one below. While the old scoreboard had video screens, the new screens are much larger in size and have a larger number of pixels per screen. The scoreboard was first used for the December 27, 2011, game against the Montreal Canadiens. For the game, only the four video screens were in place; the LED rings were to be operational for the All-Star Game.

== 2012 NHL All-Star Game ==
The Senators were the hosts of the 59th NHL All-Star Game in January 2012. The Ottawa Convention Centre hosted a Fan Fair of fan activities from the Thursday until Saturday. The Rideau Canal had to close due to mild weather, but the Senators' new Rink of Dreams was able to be used in its place. Confederation Park was used for ice sculptures and displays.

In the annual All-Star Game voting, Senators fans voted four members of the team to the All-Star roster: Daniel Alfredsson, Erik Karlsson, Milan Michalek and Jason Spezza. Karlsson led all players in voting with over 939,591 votes cast. Colin Greening was added later by the NHL operations department. Alfredsson was named captain of one team and was able to put the Senators onto his team, except for Greening, who was selected at random for the other All-Star team, coached by former Senator Zdeno Chara. Senators' fans in attendance at the game were thrilled when Alfredsson scored two consecutive goals in the second period, giving him a standing ovation.

== Off-season ==
After firing Head Coach Cory Clouston at the end of their 2010–11 season, the Senators began a search for a new head coach. According to media reports, Bryan Murray interviewed several candidates for the job, including Kurt Kleinendorst (coach of the Binghamton Senators), Dave Cameron (coach of the Mississauga St. Michael's Majors), Craig MacTavish (former coach of the Edmonton Oilers), Paul MacLean (assistant coach of the Detroit Red Wings) and Kirk Muller (assistant coach of the Montreal Canadiens). On June 14, 2011, the Senators announced the signing of Paul MacLean to a three-year contract as the new head coach. On June 23, 2011, Dave Cameron and Mark Reeds were hired as his assistant coaches. Reeds was the head coach of the Owen Sound Attack from the Ontario Hockey League (OHL).

The Senators unveiled a new third jersey on October 1, 2011. The new third jersey replaces the "SENS" design third jersey. The New Jersey is primarily black, with horizontal red and off-white stripes in a pattern reminiscent of the original Ottawa Senators jersey of 1926–27. The team will wear the jersey 11 times at home and once on the road. The symbolism of the number 11 corresponds to the number of Stanley Cup championships the original Senators won.

== Pre-season ==
On June 22, 2011, the Senators announced that they would be playing seven games during the pre-season – three games at home, three games on the road and one neutral-site game. The team will play divisional rivals Toronto, Montreal and Boston twice each. Meanwhile, the Senators will also play the Winnipeg Jets once in Conception Bay South, Newfoundland, as part of the Kraft Hockeyville Celebrations. The game was moved to Mile One Centre by Conception Bay South to maximize the use of arena upgrade dollars for renovations, instead of preparing their arena for the exhibition game.

The Senators held a rookie camp in early September. The rookies participated in a rookie tournament in Oshawa, Ontario, with rookies of the Chicago Blackhawks, Pittsburgh Penguins and Toronto Maple Leafs. The team won all of its games in the tournament. All members of the rookie camp were invited to the main training camp, which started on September 16 at Scotiabank Place and the Bell Sensplex.

== Regular season ==
The Ottawa Senators 20th Anniversary patch

The Senators opened the season on October 7, 2011, at the Detroit Red Wings. The Senators finished the season on April 7, 2012. 81 of 82 games were televised, either on CBC, RDS, Sportsnet, TSN or TVA. The sole game not televised was a visit to the Florida Panthers on February 15, 2012. The NHL later organized a video feed available to NHL Centre Ice subscribers in Ottawa for the Panthers game.

The Senators had their home opener on October 11, 2011, against the Minnesota Wild. Since it is the franchise's 20th anniversary season, the Senators had special celebrations. With 14 members of the 1992–93 team in attendance, Laurie Boschman, the 1992–93 team's captain, dropped the puck on the ceremonial face-off. The team went on to win the game 4–3 via shoot-out. It was head coach Paul MacLean's first win as a head coach in the NHL.

Nikita Filatov, a 21-year-old Russian player (and former first-round pick) acquired in a trade at the 2011 NHL entry draft, had an up-and-down season between Ottawa and Binghamton before being loaned to CKSA Moscow of the Kontinental Hockey League (KHL) in December; he played for CSKA for the remainder of the season. Filatov was to be a restricted free agent at the end of the season, and general manager Bryan Murray indicated that the club had not given up on Filatov, and would put in at least a qualifying offer at season's end.

The Senators made a trade in December 2011 for the Phoenix Coyotes' Kyle Turris in exchange for David Rundblad and a draft pick. After Turris arrived in Ottawa, the team won ten of 13 games, and had a nine-game unbeaten streak over the end of December into January. The run pushed the Senators up into a playoff position. On December 17, the Senators were in tenth position. On January 20, the Senators were as high as fourth in the Eastern Conference.

In February, goaltender Craig Anderson cut the pinky finger on his right hand while preparing food at home. The injury put him out of action as the cut made him unable to hold the goal stick while the injury healed. The Senators made a trade to improve the organizational depth at goaltender, trading for Ben Bishop of the St. Louis Blues. Bishop was playing for the Blues' American Hockey League (AHL) affiliate and was due to become an unrestricted free agent. Bishop had won the MVP award at the AHL 2012 All-Star Game and was considered one of the best prospects outside the NHL. Before the trade, the Senators had recalled Robin Lehner from Binghamton and Bishop reported to Binghamton. Although Lehner played well and earned his first NHL shutout, Lehner was sent to Binghamton in early March and Bishop recalled to Ottawa. While Ottawa continued to earn points, division leader Boston struggled, and the Senators found winning the division feasible. On March 16, the Senators moved past the Bruins into first place in the Northeast Division and second overall in the Eastern Conference. The lead lasted one day, but the Senators qualified for the playoffs, an unexpected development that made head coach MacLean a candidate for coach of the year.

== Playoffs ==
The Senators succeeded in making the playoffs after missing them in the 2010–11 season, with a 5–1 win over the New York Islanders on April 1, 2012. The Hockey News had predicted that the Senators would finish last in the Eastern Conference and miss the playoffs.

=== Senators vs. Rangers ===
The Senators qualified in eighth place, drawing the first-place New York Rangers in the first round. Although the Senators won three out of four games during the regular season between the two teams, the NHL Network predicted the Rangers will win in five or six games. ESPN predicted the Rangers would win in seven games. It was the first New York–Ottawa series since the first Senators played the Rangers in 1927–28, and the last until 2016-17.

In the first game, the Rangers scored once in the first, and twice in the second to take a 3–0 lead into the third period. In the third, the Rangers scored to make it 4–0 before Daniel Alfredsson and Erik Condra scored in the last ten minutes. It was close until the middle of the game. The Rangers were leading 1–0 late in the second period and the Senators were pressing for an equalizer. The Rangers took a time-out and from there, scored three times in six minutes ( from the second into the third period) to build the lead the Senators could not overcome.

In game two, the Senators added two players known for fighting to the roster: Matt Carkner and Zenon Konopka, changes described by coach MacLean as done in response to the Rangers' Brian Boyle's rough treatment of Erik Karlsson. After only two minutes of play, Carkner was ejected from the game for fighting Boyle, who did not want to fight Carkner, and punching him after Boyle went down to the ice. The Rangers' Brandon Dubinsky jumped into the fight and was ejected for being the third man into a fight. In the second period, the Rangers' Carl Hagelin elbowed Alfredsson and was ejected. In the game itself, the Rangers took a one-goal lead after one period. The Senators equalized during the match penalty to Hagelin to leave the game tied after two. In the third, Boyle scored to put the Rangers ahead, but Nick Foligno tied the score with four minutes to play. In the overtime, the Senators applied pressure from the start, and Chris Neil scored to win the game for the Senators after only one minute of overtime. For their actions during the game, the NHL later gave Hagelin a three-game suspension, and Carkner a one-game suspension.

Alfredsson did not return for game three, as he was still suffering from a concussion from the Hagelin hit. The first star of the game was the Rangers' goaltender Henrik Lundqvist, who stopped all 39 Senators shots on net for a shutout. The game was scoreless until the third period when the Rangers' Boyle scored on a backhand after the puck bounced off the back boards directly to him nearly in front of the Senators' goaltender Craig Anderson, who stopped 21 of 22 shots. It was the only goal of the match. Lundqvist preserved the win with a save in the final minute on Kyle Turris, who was alone in front of the Rangers' goal with the Senators pressing and their goaltender pulled for an extra attacker.

In game four, it was the Ottawa goalie Anderson's turn to save a game. After giving up two power play goals by the Rangers in the first few minutes, he stopped the Rangers the rest of the way. In the second period, the Senators tied the game on goals by Milan Michalek and Sergei Gonchar. No goals were scored leading to the second overtime of the series. In the overtime, the Senators' Kyle Turris scored his first-ever overtime goal to tie the series after four games, ensuring a game six in Ottawa. Ottawa captain Alfredsson missed another game. It was the first victory at home by the Senators since the 2007 Stanley Cup Finals.

The fifth game, in New York, saw Anderson continue to hold off the Rangers, stopping all of their shots for a 2–0 shutout victory. Junior call up Mark Stone made an impression, setting up the winning goal of the game by Spezza in the first period. Spezza added an empty net goal to seal the victory. It was Stone's NHL debut.

Game six was played in Ottawa with the Senators having a chance to eliminate the Rangers. The Senators scored the first goal of the game in the first period on a power play. With Anderson continuing to hold off the Rangers, it appeared the Senators might have scored enough. It all changed in the second period with three goals by the Rangers, including a pair on the power play, to put the Rangers ahead 3–1. Anderson's shutout streak of the Rangers ended at 145 minutes, 27 seconds. In the third, Senators' coach Paul MacLean benched stars Spezza and Alfredsson in a ploy to turn their games around, but it was ineffective. Alfredsson himself showed a rare temper outburst on the bench, due to his frustration. The Senators scored a goal on a disputed play in the last minute, but it was too little, too late. The game was the NHL debut for Senators prospect Jakob Silfverberg, who had just finished playing in the Swedish Elitserien playoffs.

The series shifted to New York for the deciding game seven. Like game six, the deciding goals were scored in the second period. The Rangers scored a pair of goals to go ahead 2–0, while Alfredsson replied on the power play for the Senators. The third period was scoreless. Alfredsson was considered to be the best player for the Senators in the game, and there was considerable speculation after the game that it might be the last game of his NHL career.

== Standings ==
Northeast Division
Pos	Team	GP	W	L	OTL	ROW	GF	GA	GD	Pts
1	y – Boston Bruins	82	49	29	4	40	269	202	+67	102
2	x – Ottawa Senators	82	41	31	10	35	249	240	+9	92
3	Buffalo Sabres	82	39	32	11	32	218	230	−12	89
4	Toronto Maple Leafs	82	35	37	10	31	231	264	−33	80
5	Montreal Canadiens	82	31	35	16	26	212	226	−14	78

Source: National Hockey League
x – Clinched playoff spot; y – Clinched division

Eastern Conference
Pos	Div	Team	GP	W	L	OTL	ROW	GF	GA	GD	Pts
1	AT	z – New York Rangers	82	51	24	7	47	226	187	+39	109
2	NE	y – Boston Bruins	82	49	29	4	40	269	202	+67	102
3	SE	y – Florida Panthers	82	38	26	18	32	203	227	−24	94
4	AT	x – Pittsburgh Penguins	82	51	25	6	42	282	221	+61	108
5	AT	x – Philadelphia Flyers	82	47	26	9	43	264	232	+32	103
6	AT	x – New Jersey Devils	82	48	28	6	36	228	209	+19	102
7	SE	x – Washington Capitals	82	42	32	8	38	222	230	−8	92
8	NE	x – Ottawa Senators	82	41	31	10	35	249	240	+9	92
9	NE	Buffalo Sabres	82	39	32	11	32	218	230	−12	89
10	SE	Tampa Bay Lightning	82	38	36	8	35	235	281	−46	84
11	SE	Winnipeg Jets	82	37	35	10	33	225	246	−21	84
12	SE	Carolina Hurricanes	82	33	33	16	32	213	243	−30	82
13	NE	Toronto Maple Leafs	82	35	37	10	31	231	264	−33	80
14	AT	New York Islanders	82	34	37	11	27	203	255	−52	79
15	NE	Montreal Canadiens	82	31	35	16	26	212	226	−14	78

Source: National Hockey League
x – Clinched playoff spot; y – Clinched division; z – Clinched conference

== Schedule and results ==
=== Pre-season ===
2011 pre-season game log: 3–3–1 (Home: 1–1–1; Road: 2–2–0)

Game	Date	Time (ET)	Opponent	Score	Decision	Location	Attendance	Recap
1	September 19	7:00 pm	Toronto	2–4	Lehner	Air Canada Centre	18,556	
2	September 21	7:30 pm	Boston	2 – 1 (OT)	Auld	Scotiabank Place	16,492	
3	September 23	7:30 pm	Montreal	3 – 4 (SO)	Anderson	Scotiabank Place	17,583	
4	September 24	7:00 pm	Montreal	3–2	Lehner	Bell Centre	21,273	
5	September 26	4:00 pm	Winnipeg	1–3	Auld	Mile One Centre (St. John's, NFLD)	6,275	
6	September 27	7:30 pm	Toronto	3–5	Lehner	Scotiabank Place	18,831	
7	September 29	7:00 pm	Boston	2–1	Anderson	TD Garden	16,763	

=== Regular season ===
2011 regular season game log: 41–28–10 (Home: 20–15–4; Road: 21–13–6)
October (Games: 12; Home: 7; Road: 5) (Record: 7–5–0; Home: 5–2–0; Road: 2–3–0)

Game	Date	Time (ET)	Opponent	Score	Decision	Location	Attendance	Record	Pts	Recap
1	October 7	7:00 pm	Detroit	3–5	Anderson	Joe Louis Arena	20,066	0–1–0	0	
2	October 8	7:00 pm	Toronto	5–6	Auld	Air Canada Centre	19,324	0–2–0	0	
3	October 11	7:30 pm	Minnesota	4 – 3 (SO)	Anderson	Scotiabank Place	19,455^{S}	1–2–0	2	
4	October 13	7:30 pm	Colorado	1–7	Anderson	Scotiabank Place	19,239^{S}	1–3–0	2	
5	October 15	7:00 pm	Washington	1–2	Auld	Verizon Center	18,506	1–4–0	2	
6	October 18	7:30 pm	Philadelphia	2–7	Auld	Scotiabank Place	18,059	1–5–0	2	
7	October 20	7:30 pm	Winnipeg	4–1	Anderson	Scotiabank Place	17,919	2–5–0	4	
8	October 22	7:00 pm	Columbus	4–3	Anderson	Scotiabank Place	18,867	3–5–0	6	
9	October 25	7:00 pm	Carolina	3 – 2 (SO)	Anderson	RBC Center	12,083	4–5–0	8	
10	October 27	7:30 pm	Florida	4–3	Anderson	Scotiabank Place	18,165	5–5–0	10	
11	October 29	3:00 pm	NY Rangers	5 – 4 (SO)	Anderson	Madison Square Garden	18,200	6–5–0	12	
12	October 30	7:30 pm	Toronto	3–2	Lehner	Scotiabank Place	19,522^{S}	7–5–0	14	

November (Games: 12; Home: 4; Road: 8) (Record: 5–5–2; Home: 1–2–1; Road: 4–3–1)

Game	Date	Time (ET)	Opponent	Score	Decision	Location	Attendance	Record	Pts	Recap
13	November 1	7:00 pm	Boston	3–5	Anderson	TD Garden	17,565	7–6–0	14	
14	November 4	7:30 pm	Montreal	1–2	Anderson	Scotiabank Place	20,329^{S}	7–7–0	14	
15	November 5	7:00 pm	Buffalo	2 – 3 (SO)	Anderson	Scotiabank Place	18,805	7–7–1	15	
16	November 9	7:30 pm	NY Rangers	2–3	Anderson	Scotiabank Place	19,543^{S}	7–8–1	15	
17	November 11	7:30 pm	Buffalo	1–5	Anderson	First Niagara Center	18,690	7–9–1	15	
18	November 12	7:00 pm	Toronto	5–2	Anderson	Air Canada Centre	19,553	8–9–1	17	
19	November 15	9:00 pm	Calgary	3–1	Anderson	Scotiabank Saddledome	19,289	9–9–1	19	
20	November 17	9:30 pm	Edmonton	5–2	Anderson	Rexall Place	16,839	10–9–1	21	
21	November 20	9:00 pm	Vancouver	1 – 2 (OT)	Auld	Rogers Arena	18,890	10–9–2	22	
22	November 25	7:00 pm	Pittsburgh	3–6	Anderson	Consol Energy Center	18,610	10–10–2	22	
23	November 27	5:00 pm	Carolina	4–3	Anderson	Scotiabank Place	19,656^{S}	11–10–2	24	
24	November 29	8:30 pm	Winnipeg	6–4	Anderson	MTS Centre	15,004	12–10–2	26	

December (Games: 15; Home: 9; Road: 6) (Record: 7–5–3; Home: 5–4–0; Road: 2–1–3)

Game	Date	Time (ET)	Opponent	Score	Decision	Location	Attendance	Record	Pts	Recap
25	December 1	8:30 pm	Dallas	2–3	Anderson	American Airlines Center	10,490	12–11–2	26	
26	December 3	7:00 pm	Washington	2 – 3 (OT)	Anderson	Verizon Center	18,506	12–11–3	27	
27	December 5	7:30 pm	Tampa Bay	4–2	Anderson	Scotiabank Place	18,742	13–11–3	29	
28	December 7	7:00 pm	Washington	3–5	Anderson	Scotiabank Place	17,771	13–12–3	29	
29	December 8	7:00 pm	New Jersey	4 – 5 (SO)	Auld	Prudential Center	13,743	13–12–4	30	
30	December 10	7:00 pm	Vancouver	1–4	Anderson	Scotiabank Place	19,171^{S}	13–13–4	30	
31	December 13	7:00 pm	Buffalo	3 – 2 (OT)	Anderson	First Niagara Center	18,690	14–13–4	32	
32	December 14	7:30 pm	Boston	2–5	Anderson	Scotiabank Place	18,088	14–14–4	32	
33	December 16	7:30 pm	Pittsburgh	6–4	Auld	Scotiabank Place	19,710^{S}	15–14–4	34	
34	December 20	7:30 pm	Buffalo	4–1	Anderson	Scotiabank Place	18,474	16–14–4	36	
35	December 22	7:30 pm	Florida	4 – 3 (OT)	Anderson	Scotiabank Place	19,296^{S}	17–14–4	38	
36	December 23	7:00 pm	Carolina	1 – 2 (OT)	Anderson	RBC Center	14,556	17–14–5	39	
37	December 27	7:30 pm	Montreal	2–6	Anderson	Scotiabank Place	20,500^{S}	17–15–5	39	
38	December 30	7:30 pm	Calgary	4–3 (OT)	Anderson	Scotiabank Place	20,500^{S}	18–15–5	41	
39	December 31	7:00 pm	Buffalo	3–2 (SO)	Anderson	First Niagara Center	18,690	19–15–5	43	

January (Games: 14; Home: 4; Road: 10) (Record: 8–5–1; Home: 3–1–0; Road: 5–4–1)

Game	Date	Time (ET)	Opponent	Score	Decision	Location	Attendance	Record	Pts	Recap
40	January 2	7:30 pm	New Jersey	3 – 2 (OT)	Anderson	Scotiabank Place	19,573^{S}	20–15–5	45	
41	January 5	7:30 pm	Tampa Bay	4–1	Anderson	Scotiabank Place	19,994^{S}	21–15–5	47	
42	January 7	1:00 pm	Philadelphia	2 – 3 (OT)	Anderson	Wells Fargo Center	19,792	21–15–6	48	
43	January 8	5:00 pm	Philadelphia	6–4	Anderson	Scotiabank Place	20,028^{S}	22–15–6	50	
44	January 10	7:00 pm	Pittsburgh	5–1	Anderson	Consol Energy Center	18,603	23–15–6	52	
45	January 12	7:00 pm	NY Rangers	3–0	Anderson	Madison Square Garden	18,200	24–15–6	54	
46	January 14	7:00 pm	Montreal	3 – 2 (SO)	Anderson	Bell Centre	21,273	25–15–6	56	
47	January 16	7:30 pm	Winnipeg	0–2	Anderson	Scotiabank Place	19,927^{S}	25–16–6	56	
48	January 17	7:00 pm	Toronto	3–2	Anderson	Air Canada Centre	19,615	26–16–6	58	
49	January 19	10:30 pm	San Jose	4–1	Anderson	HP Pavilion	17,562	27–16–6	60	
50	January 21	4:00 pm	Anaheim	1–2	Anderson	Honda Center	15,500	27–17–6	60	
51	January 23	10:30 pm	Los Angeles	1–4	Anderson	Staples Center	18,118	27–18–6	60	
52	January 24	9:00 pm	Phoenix	2–3	Anderson	Jobing.com Arena	8,061	27–19–6	60	
53	January 31	7:00 pm	Boston	3–4	Anderson	TD Garden	17,565	27–20–6	60	

February (Games: 12; Home: 8; Road: 4) (Record: 7–3–2; Home: 3–3–2; Road: 4–0–0)

Game	Date	Time (ET)	Opponent	Score	Decision	Location	Attendance	Record	Pts	Recap
54	February 3	7:30 pm	NY Islanders	1 – 2 (OT)	Anderson	Scotiabank Place	18,252	27–20–7	61	
55	February 4	7:00 pm	Toronto	0–5	Anderson	Scotiabank Place	20,500^{S}	27–21–7	61	
56	February 7	7:30 pm	St. Louis	1–3	Anderson	Scotiabank Place	18,952	27–22–7	61	
57	February 9	7:30 pm	Nashville	4–3	Auld	Scotiabank Place	18,592	28–22–7	63	
58	February 11	2:00 pm	Edmonton	3 – 4 (OT)	Anderson	Scotiabank Place	20,085^{S}	28–22–8	64	
59	February 14	7:00 pm	Tampa Bay	4–0	Anderson	St. Pete Times Forum	17,488	29–22–8	66	
60	February 15	7:30 pm	Florida	6–2	Anderson	BankAtlantic Center	14,038	30–22–8	68	
61	February 20	1:00 pm	NY Islanders	6–0	Anderson	Nassau Veterans Memorial Coliseum	15,818	31–22–8	70	
62	February 22	7:00 pm	Washington	5–2	Anderson	Scotiabank Place	18,357	32–22–8	72	
63	February 25	7:00 pm	Boston	3–5	Auld	Scotiabank Place	19,444^{S}	32–23–8	72	
64	February 26	5:00 pm	NY Islanders	5–2	Lehner	Scotiabank Place	19,660^{S}	33–23–8	74	
65	February 28	7:00 pm	Boston	1–0	Lehner	TD Garden	17,565	34–23–8	76	

March (Games: 13; Home: 7; Road: 6) (Record: 6–5–2; Home: 3–3–1; Road: 3–2–1)

Game	Date	Time (ET)	Opponent	Score	Decision	Location	Attendance	Record	Pts	Recap
66	March 2	7:00 pm	Chicago	1–2	Lehner	Scotiabank Place	18,788	34–24–8	76	
67	March 4	6:00 pm	Florida	2–4	Lehner	BankAtlantic Center	15,811	34–25–8	76	
68	March 6	7:30 pm	Tampa Bay	7–3	Bishop	St. Pete Times Forum	18,967	35–25–8	78	
69	March 8	7:30 pm	NY Rangers	4–1	Bishop	Scotiabank Place	18,854	36–25–8	80	
70	March 10	7:00 pm	Buffalo	3 – 4 (SO)	Bishop	Scotiabank Place	19,951^{S}	36–25–9	81	
71	March 14	7:30 pm	Montreal	2 – 3 (SO)	Bishop	Bell Centre	21,273	36–25–10	82	
72	March 16	7:00 pm	Montreal	2 – 1 (OT)	Bishop	Scotiabank Place	20,500^{S}	37–25–10	84	
73	March 17	7:00 pm	Toronto	1–3	Bishop	Scotiabank Place	20,500^{S}	37–26–10	84	
74	March 20	7:30 pm	New Jersey	0–1	Bishop	Scotiabank Place	19,834^{S}	37–27–10	84	
75	March 23	7:30 pm	Montreal	1–5	Anderson	Bell Centre	21,273	37–28–10	84	
76	March 24	7:00 pm	Pittsburgh	8–4	Anderson	Scotiabank Place	20,076^{S}	38–28–10	86	
77	March 26	8:30 pm	Winnipeg	6–4	Anderson	MTS Centre	15,004	39–28–10	88	
78	March 31	1:00 pm	Philadelphia	4 – 3 (SO)	Anderson	Wells Fargo Center	19,822	40–28–10	90	

April (Games: 4; Home: 2; Road: 2) (Record: 1–3–0; Home: 0–2–0; Road: 1–1–0)

Game	Date	Time (ET)	Opponent	Score	Decision	Location	Attendance	Record	Pts	Recap
79	April 1	3:00 pm	NY Islanders	5–1	Anderson	Nassau Veterans Memorial Coliseum	14,210	41–28–10	92	
80	April 3	7:30 pm	Carolina	1–2	Anderson	Scotiabank Place	19,484^{S}	41–29–10	92	
81	April 5	7:30 pm	Boston	1–3	Bishop	Scotiabank Place	20,500^{S}	41–30–10	92	
82	April 7	3:00 pm	New Jersey	2–4	Anderson	Prudential Center	17,625	41–31–10	92	

=== Playoffs ===
Eastern Conference Quarter-final – #8 Senators vs. #1 Rangers – Rangers win series 4–3

Game	Date	Time	Score	Decision	Location	Attendance	Record	Recap
1	April 12	7 pm	2–4	Anderson	Madison Square Garden	18,200	0–1	
2	April 14	7 pm	3–2 (OT)	Anderson	Madison Square Garden	18,200	1–1	
3	April 16	7:30 pm	0–1	Anderson	Scotiabank Place	20,182^{S}	1–2	
4	April 18	7:30 pm	3–2 (OT)	Anderson	Scotiabank Place	20,340^{S}	2–2	
5	April 21	7 pm	2–0	Anderson	Madison Square Garden	18,200	3–2	
6	April 23	7 pm	2–3	Anderson	Scotiabank Place	20,500^{S}	3–3	
7	April 26	7 pm	1–2	Anderson	Madison Square Garden	18,200	3–4	
Notes: S.Sell-out (over 19,153 at Scotiabank Place).

== Player statistics ==
Source: Ottawa Senators. Source: NHL.

=== Scoring ===
Regular season

Player	GP	G	A	Pts	+/−	PIM
Jason Spezza	80	34	50	84	11	36
Erik Karlsson	81	19	59	78	16	42
Milan Michalek	77	35	25	60	4	32
Daniel Alfredsson	75	27	32	59	16	18
Nick Foligno	82	15	32	47	2	124
Colin Greening	82	17	20	37	−4	46
Sergei Gonchar	74	5	32	37	−4	55
Filip Kuba	73	6	26	32	26	26
Kyle Turris^{†}	49	12	17	29	12	27
Chris Neil	72	13	15	28	−10	178
Zack Smith	81	14	12	26	4	98
Erik Condra	81	8	17	25	11	30
Chris Phillips	80	5	14	19	12	16
Jared Cowen	82	5	12	17	−4	56
Bobby Butler	56	6	10	16	8	12
Kaspars Daugavins	65	5	6	11	−2	12
Brian Lee^{‡}	35	1	7	8	−2	27
Jesse Winchester	32	2	6	8	2	22
Jim O'Brien	28	3	3	6	6	4
Zenon Konopka	55	3	2	5	−4	193
Stephane Da Costa	22	3	2	5	−9	8
Peter Regin	10	2	2	4	3	2
David Rundblad^{‡}	24	1	3	4	−11	6
Matt Carkner	29	1	2	3	0	33
Matt Gilroy^{†}	14	1	2	3	0	2
Rob Klinkhammer	15	0	2	2	0	2
Nikita Filatov	9	0	1	1	1	4
Mika Zibanejad	9	0	1	1	−3	2
Mike Hoffman	1	0	0	0	−1	0
Andre Petersson	1	0	0	0	0	0
Mark Borowiecki	2	0	0	0	−1	2

As of April 8, 2012.

Playoffs

Player	GP	G	A	Pts	+/−	PIM
Jason Spezza	7	3	2	5	2	8
Sergei Gonchar	7	1	3	4	1	6
Nick Foligno	7	1	3	4	−1	8
Chris Neil	7	2	1	3	2	22
Kyle Turris	7	1	2	3	−1	2
Daniel Alfredsson	4	2	0	2	−3	0
Filip Kuba	7	0	2	2	1	10
Zenon Konopka	6	0	2	2	2	2
Milan Michalek	7	1	1	2	3	4
Chris Phillips	7	0	1	1	0	4
Matt Carkner	4	0	1	1	1	21
Colin Greening	7	0	1	1	1	0
Erik Condra	7	1	0	1	0	0
Jim O'Brien	7	0	1	1	0	0
Zack Smith	7	0	1	1	-2	10
Erik Karlsson	7	1	0	1	0	4
Jared Cowen	7	0	1	1	−3	4
Mark Stone	1	0	1	1	1	0
Kaspars Daugavins	1	0	0	0	−1	0
Jesse Winchester	4	0	0	0	-2	0
Matt Gilroy	3	0	0	0	0	0
Jakob Silfverberg	2	0	0	0	0	2
Bobby Butler	3	0	0	0	0	0

=== Goaltending ===
Source: NHL.

Regular season

Player	GP	Min	W	L	OTL	GA	GAA	SA	Sv%	SO	G	A	Pts	PIM
Craig Anderson	63	3492	33	22	6	165	2.84	1917	.914	3	0	4	4	4
Alex Auld	14	645	2	4	2	36	3.35	310	.884	0	0	0	0	0
Ben Bishop^{†}	10	532	3	3	2	22	2.48	243	.909	0	0	0	0	2
Robin Lehner	5	299	3	2	0	10	2.01	154	.935	1	0	0	0	0

Playoffs

Player	GP	Min	W	L	GA	GAA	SA	Sv%	SO	G	A	Pts	PIM
Craig Anderson	7	419	3	4	14	2.00	208	.933	1	0	0	0	0

^{†}Denotes player spent time with another team before joining Senators. Stats reflect time with Senators only.
^{‡}Traded mid-season.

Note:

Pos = Position;GP = Games played; G = Goals; A = Assists; Pts = Points; PIM = Penalty minutes; +/- = Plus/minus; PPG = Power-play goals; SHG = Short-handed goals; GWG = Game-winning goals
Pos = Position;GP = Games played; Min, TOI = Minutes played; W = Wins; L = Losses; T,T/OT = Ties; OTL = Overtime losses; GA = Goals-against; GAA = Goals-against average; SO = Shutouts; SA = Shots against; SV = Shots saved;SV% = Save percentage;

== Awards/Milestones ==
=== Awards ===
Regular Season
Player	Award	Awarded
Jason Spezza	NHL Second Star of the Week	October 24, 2011
Jason Spezza	NHL First Star of the Week	December 19, 2011
Craig Anderson	NHL Third Star of the Week	January 9, 2012
Craig Anderson	NHL First Star of the Week	January 16, 2012
Daniel Alfredsson	NHL Third Star of the Week	January 30, 2012
Jason Spezza	NHL Third Star of the Week	February 20, 2012
Erik Karlsson	NHL First Star of the Week	February 27, 2012
Erik Karlsson	NHL Second Star of the Month	February 2012
Craig Anderson	Molson Cup	April 2012

==== NHL awards ====
Norris Trophy	Erik Karlsson
King Clancy Trophy	Daniel Alfredsson
First All-Star team	Erik Karlsson

=== Records ===
The Senators set a new franchise record for the fastest two goals scored on October 8, 2011, in a 6–5 loss to the Toronto Maple Leafs at the Air Canada Centre. The first goal was scored by Jason Spezza at 15:36 of the third period, while the second goal was scored eight seconds later by Daniel Alfredsson. The previous record was nine seconds, set the previous season.

On February 22, 2012, Erik Karlsson set a new franchise record for assists by a defenceman in a single season by tallying two assists, bringing his total to 47, in a 5–2 victory over the Washington Capitals. The previous record was held by Norm MacIver, who tallied 46 assists during the modern franchise's inaugural season in 1992–93.

On February 26, 2012, Erik Karlsson set a new franchise record for points by a defenceman in a single season by tallying two assists, bringing his points total to 65, in a 5–2 victory over the New York Islanders. The previous record was held by Norm MacIver, who tallied 63 points during the modern franchise's inaugural season in 1992–93.

=== Milestones ===
Regular season

Player	Achievement	Date
Mika Zibanejad	1st NHL game 1st NHL assist 1st NHL point	October 7, 2011
Stephane Da Costa	1st NHL goal 1st NHL point	October 8, 2011
David Rundblad	1st NHL game	October 11, 2011
David Rundblad	1st NHL assist 1st NHL point	October 15, 2011
Craig Anderson	100th career win	October 20, 2011
Zenon Konopka	200th NHL game	October 22, 2011
Kaspars Daugavins	1st NHL goal 1st NHL point 1st NHL GWG	October 30, 2011
Jared Cowen	1st NHL goal 1st NHL point	November 1, 2011
Stephane Da Costa	1st NHL assist	November 1, 2011
Kaspars Daugavins	1st NHL assist	November 12, 2011
Jason Spezza	200th NHL goal	November 27, 2011
David Rundblad	1st NHL goal	November 27, 2011
Milan Michalek	300th NHL point	November 29, 2011
Jared Cowen	1st NHL assist	December 1, 2011
Zack Smith	100th NHL game	December 8, 2011
Jared Cowen	1st NHL GWG	December 13, 2011
Nick Foligno	300th NHL game	December 13, 2011
Erik Karlsson	100th NHL point	December 16, 2011
Chris Neil	100th NHL assist	December 20, 2011
Mike Hoffman	1st NHL game	December 23, 2011
Filip Kuba	300th NHL point	December 23, 2011
Daniel Alfredsson	400th NHL goal	December 30, 2011
Mark Borowiecki	1st NHL game	January 19, 2012
Sergei Gonchar	1,100th NHL game	January 19, 2012
Andre Petersson	1st NHL game	January 21, 2012
Chris Neil	700th NHL game	January 21, 2012
Daniel Alfredsson	1,100th NHL game	January 21, 2012
Chris Phillips	250th NHL point	January 24, 2012
Milan Michalek	500th NHL game	February 7, 2012
Chris Phillips	1,000th NHL game	February 9, 2012
Jim O'Brien	1st NHL goal 1st NHL point	February 15, 2012
Erik Karlsson	100th NHL assist	February 22, 2012
Jason Spezza	600th NHL point	February 25, 2012
Robin Lehner	1st NHL shutout	February 28, 2012
Erik Karlsson	200th NHL game	March 2, 2012
Jim O'Brien	1st NHL assist	March 4, 2012
Rob Klinkhammer	1st NHL assist 1st NHL point	March 8, 2012
Filip Kuba	250th NHL assist	March 14, 2012
Jason Spezza	600th NHL game	March 23, 2012
Erik Condra	100th NHL game	March 23, 2012
Colin Greening	100th NHL game	March 24, 2012
Zenon Konopka	250th NHL game	March 24, 2012

Playoffs

Player	Achievement	Date
Zenon Konpoka	1st NHL playoff game 1st NHL playoff assist 1st NHL playoff point	April 14, 2012
Mark Stone	1st NHL point	April 21, 2012

== Transactions ==
=== Trades ===
Date	Details
June 24, 2011	To Detroit Red Wings 2nd-round pick (35th overall) in 2011; 2nd-round pick (48th overall) in 2011	To Ottawa Senators 1st-round pick (24th overall) in 2011
June 25, 2011	To Columbus Blue Jackets 3rd-round pick (66th overall) in 2011	To Ottawa Senators Nikita Filatov
December 2, 2011	To Chicago Blackhawks Conditional 7th-round pick in 2013	To Ottawa Senators Rob Klinkhammer
December 17, 2011	To Phoenix Coyotes David Rundblad; 2nd-round pick in 2012	To Ottawa Senators Kyle Turris
February 26, 2012	To St. Louis Blues 2nd-round pick in 2013	To Ottawa Senators Ben Bishop
February 27, 2012	To Tampa Bay Lightning Brian Lee	To Ottawa Senators Matt Gilroy

=== Free agents signed ===
Player	Former team	Date	Contract terms
Alex Auld	Montreal Canadiens	July 1, 2011	1-year, $1 million
Zenon Konopka	New York Islanders	July 5, 2011	1-year, $700,000
Mark Parrish	Buffalo Sabres	July 8, 2011	1-year, $650,000 two-way
Mike McKenna	New Jersey Devils	July 8, 2011	1-year, $550,000 two-way
Lee Sweatt	Vancouver Canucks	July 11, 2011	2-year, $1.3 million two-way
Tim Conboy	Portland Pirates	July 11, 2011	1-year, $600,000 two-way
Cole Schneider	University of Connecticut	March 14, 2012	2-year, $1.85 million entry-level contract

=== Free agents lost ===
Player	New team	Contract terms
Ryan Potulny	Washington Capitals	2-year, $1.05 million
Curtis McElhinney	Phoenix Coyotes	1-year, $625,000
Ryan Keller	Edmonton Oilers	1-year, $625,000 two-way
Ryan Shannon	Tampa Bay Lightning	1-year, $625,000
Roman Wick	Kloten Flyers	3-years, undisclosed
Cody Bass	Columbus Blue Jackets	1-year, $600,000 two-way
Derek Smith	Calgary Flames	1-year, $700,000 two-way
Andre Benoit	Spartak Moscow	1-year

=== Claimed via waivers ===
Player	Former team	Date claimed off waivers

=== Lost via waivers ===
Player	New team	Date claimed off waivers

=== Player signings ===
Player	Date	Contract terms
Colin Greening	May 19, 2011	3-year, $2.45 million
Zack Smith	May 19, 2011	2-year, $1.4 million
Louie Caporusso	May 30, 2011	2-year, $1.13 million entry-level
Jakob Silfverberg	May 30, 2011	3-year, $2.59 million entry-level
Francis Lessard	July 1, 2011	1-year, $550,000 two-way
Erik Condra	July 6, 2011	2-year, $1.25 million
Mika Zibanejad	July 13, 2011	3-year, $2.775 million entry-level
Bobby Butler	July 14, 2011	2-year, $2.15 million
Kaspars Daugavins	August 3, 2011	1-year, $600,000 two-way
Mark Stone	September 19, 2011	3-year, $1.89 million entry-level contract
Stefan Noesen	December 29, 2011	3-year, $2.775 million entry-level contract
Matt Puempel	December 29, 2011	3-year, $2.775 million entry-level contract
Ben Bishop	February 26, 2012	1-year, $650,000 one-way contract extension
Chris Wideman	March 28, 2012	2-year, $1.18 million entry-level contract
Ben Blood	April 6, 2012	2-year, $1.65 million entry-level contract

== Draft picks ==
The 2011 NHL entry draft was held in Saint Paul, Minnesota. The Senators picked sixth overall with their own draft pick, and 21st overall with the first-round pick of the Nashville Predators, acquired in exchange for a 2011 trade of Mike Fisher. After picking 21st, the Senators traded their 35th and 48th overall picks (the later pick acquired from the Chicago Blackhawks in exchange for Chris Campoli) to the Detroit Red Wings in exchange for the 24th overall pick. This marked the first time in franchise history that the Senators picked three times in the first round.

Round	Overall pick	Player	Position	Nationality	College/junior/club team (league)
1	6	Mika Zibanejad	Centre	Sweden	Djurgardens IF (Elitserien)
1	21 (from Nashville)	Stefan Noesen	Right wing	United States	Plymouth Whalers (OHL)
1	24 (from Detroit)	Matt Puempel	Left wing	Canada	Peterborough Petes (OHL)
2	61 (from Boston)	Shane Prince	Centre	United States	Ottawa 67's (OHL)
4	96	Jean-Gabriel Pageau	Centre	Canada	Gatineau Olympiques (QMJHL)
5	126	Fredrik Claesson	Defence	Sweden	Djurgardens IF (Elitserien)
6	156	Darren Kramer	Centre	Canada	Spokane Chiefs (WHL)
6	171 (from Phoenix)	Max McCormick	Left wing	United States	Sioux City Musketeers (USHL)
7	186	Jordan Fransoo	Defence	Canada	Brandon Wheat Kings (WHL)
7	204 (from Pittsburgh)	Ryan Dzingel	Centre	United States	Lincoln Stars (USHL)

== See also ==
- 2011–12 NHL season
