= 2011–12 New York Rangers season =

NHL hockey team season

2011–12 New York Rangers
- Atlantic Division champions
- Division: 1st Atlantic
- Conference: 1st Eastern
- 2011–12 record: 51–24–7
- Home record: 27–12–2
- Road record: 24–12–5
- Goals for: 226
- Goals against: 187

Team information
- General manager: Glen Sather
- Coach: John Tortorella
- Captain: Ryan Callahan
- Alternate captains: Brad Richards; Marc Staal
- Arena: Madison Square Garden
- Average attendance: 18,191 (100.0%); Total: 745,852 (41 games)

Team leaders
- Goals: Marian Gaborik (41)
- Assists: Brad Richards (41)
- Points: Marian Gaborik (76)
- Penalty minutes: Brandon Prust (156)
- Plus/minus: Ryan McDonagh (+25)
- Wins: Henrik Lundqvist (39)
- Goals against average: Henrik Lundqvist (1.97)

The 2011–12 New York Rangers season was the franchise's 85th season of play and their 86th season overall. The Rangers finished the regular season in first place in the Eastern Conference, winning the Atlantic Division title, the franchise's seventh division title, and their first since the 1993–94 championship season. The team's 51 wins and 109 points were also the most since their last championship. In the playoffs, the Rangers reached the Conference finals for the first time since 1997, losing to the New Jersey Devils in six games.

== Off-season ==
On April 11, 2011, the NHL announced that the Rangers would open the regular season in Stockholm, Sweden, on October 7, 2011, against the Los Angeles Kings, and on October 8 against the Anaheim Ducks as part of the 2011 NHL Premiere.

On May 13, Rangers forward Derek Boogaard was found dead in his apartment. Boogaard had played in 22 games for the Rangers during the 2010–11 season after signing a four-year deal with the Rangers in the previous off-season.

On June 29, Rangers captain Chris Drury's contract was bought out.

On July 2, free agent Brad Richards signed a nine-year contract worth almost $60 million with the Rangers. Richards had been considered to be the top free agent of 2011.

On August 4, Sean Avery was arrested at his home in Hollywood Hills for battery on a police officer after pushing an officer that was trying to break up a party at Avery's home.

On September 12, the Rangers announced that Ryan Callahan would be the 26th captain in New York Rangers history. Brad Richards and Marc Staal were named as alternate captains.

On September 26, the NHL officially announced that the Rangers would face the Philadelphia Flyers on January 2, 2012, in the 2012 NHL Winter Classic at Citizens Bank Park, the home of the Philadelphia Phillies. As part of the Winter Classic festivities, the Rangers were featured in HBO's 24/7 series. The throwback jerseys the Rangers wore for the Winter Classic were unveiled at an event on November 28.

== Regular season ==
On December 10, the Rangers won their 2,500th game in franchise history at the Buffalo Sabres, 4–1.

On December 17, in a game against the Phoenix Coyotes in Phoenix, Brad Richards scored the game-winning goal with 0.1 seconds left in the third period to win the game for the Rangers 3–2, at the last possible moment in regulation.

On January 2, 2012, the Rangers beat the Philadelphia Flyers 3–2 in the 2012 NHL Winter Classic, moving into first place overall in the NHL for the first time at this point in the season since the 1995–96 season.

On January 6, thanks to the Rangers' first place standing in the Eastern Conference, Head Coach John Tortorella was named as one of the coaches for the 2012 NHL All-Star Game.

The Rangers set an NHL record by not allowing more than four goals in regulation in a game through the first 69 games of the season. The Rangers, with back-up goaltender Martin Biron playing, lost to the Pittsburgh Penguins on March 15 by a score of 5–2 to break the streak.

From March 11 to March 23, the Rangers had a seven-game homestand (playing every other day during that span), tying a franchise record for most consecutive games played at Madison Square Garden. The other time this occurred was between December 10 and December 23 of the 2001–02 season.

The Rangers became the first Eastern Conference team to clinch a playoff spot with a 4–2 victory over the New Jersey Devils on March 20.

With a victory on March 24 against the Toronto Maple Leafs, the Rangers reached the 100-point plateau for the seventh time in franchise history, and the first time since the 2005–06 season.

On March 28, Henrik Lundqvist notched his 250th career win as the Broadway Blueshirts netminder, thus becoming the 45th goalie in NHL history to reach this plateau, in a 4–2 victory over the Winnipeg Jets at the MTS Centre.

With a 5–3 win at the Philadelphia Flyers on April 3, the Rangers clinched the Atlantic Division title and first place in the Eastern Conference with their 51st win in their 80th game of the season. The Rangers had been in first place in the Conference since December 30, 2011. It was the first title of either kind for the Rangers since winning the 1994 Stanley Cup.

Rookie Carl Hagelin was an early standout, coming in 6th on the team in both goals and total points, despite playing in only 64 games.

== Standings ==
=== Divisional standings ===
Atlantic Division
Pos	Team	GP	W	L	OTL	ROW	GF	GA	GD	Pts
1	New York Rangers	82	51	24	7	47	226	187	+39	109
2	Pittsburgh Penguins	82	51	25	6	42	282	221	+61	108
3	Philadelphia Flyers	82	47	26	9	43	264	232	+32	103
4	New Jersey Devils	82	48	28	6	36	228	209	+19	102
5	New York Islanders	82	34	37	11	27	203	255	−52	79

Source: National Hockey League

=== Conference standings ===
Eastern Conference
Pos	Div	Team	GP	W	L	OTL	ROW	GF	GA	GD	Pts
1	AT	z – New York Rangers	82	51	24	7	47	226	187	+39	109
2	NE	y – Boston Bruins	82	49	29	4	40	269	202	+67	102
3	SE	y – Florida Panthers	82	38	26	18	32	203	227	−24	94
4	AT	x – Pittsburgh Penguins	82	51	25	6	42	282	221	+61	108
5	AT	x – Philadelphia Flyers	82	47	26	9	43	264	232	+32	103
6	AT	x – New Jersey Devils	82	48	28	6	36	228	209	+19	102
7	SE	x – Washington Capitals	82	42	32	8	38	222	230	−8	92
8	NE	x – Ottawa Senators	82	41	31	10	35	249	240	+9	92
9	NE	Buffalo Sabres	82	39	32	11	32	218	230	−12	89
10	SE	Tampa Bay Lightning	82	38	36	8	35	235	281	−46	84
11	SE	Winnipeg Jets	82	37	35	10	33	225	246	−21	84
12	SE	Carolina Hurricanes	82	33	33	16	32	213	243	−30	82
13	NE	Toronto Maple Leafs	82	35	37	10	31	231	264	−33	80
14	AT	New York Islanders	82	34	37	11	27	203	255	−52	79
15	NE	Montreal Canadiens	82	31	35	16	26	212	226	−14	78

Source: National Hockey League
x – Clinched playoff spot; y – Clinched division; z – Clinched conference

== Schedule and results ==
=== Pre-season ===
2011 pre-season: 4–2–1 (home: 0–0–0; road: 4–2–1)

Game	Date	Opponent	Score	Decision	Record
1	September 21 (in Albany, New York)	@ New Jersey Devils	2 – 1 OT	Talbot	0–0–1
2	September 23	@ New Jersey Devils	4–3	Johnson	1–0–1
3	September 26	@ Philadelphia Flyers	5–3	Lundqvist	1–1–1
4	September 29 (in Prague, Czech Republic)	@ Sparta Praha	2–0	Biron	2–1–1
5	September 30 (in Gothenburg, Sweden)	@ Frölunda HC	4–2	Lundqvist	3–1–1
6	October 2 (in Bratislava, Slovakia)	@ Slovan Bratislava	4–1	Lundqvist	4–1–1
7	October 3 (in Zug, Switzerland)	@ EV Zug	8–4	Biron	4–2–1

=== Regular season ===
2011–12 game log
October: 4–3–3, 11 points (home: 1–1–1; road: 3–2–2)

Game	October	Opponent	Score	Decision	Record
1	7 (in Stockholm, Sweden)	@ Los Angeles Kings	3 – 2 (OT)	Lundqvist	0–0–1
2	8 (in Stockholm, Sweden)	@ Anaheim Ducks	2 – 1 (SO)	Lundqvist	0–0–2
3	15	@ New York Islanders	4–2	Lundqvist	0–1–2
4	18	@ Vancouver Canucks	4–0	Lundqvist	1–1–2
5	20	@ Calgary Flames	3 – 2 (OT)	Lundqvist	2–1–2
6	22	@ Edmonton Oilers	2–0	Lundqvist	2–2–2
7	24	@ Winnipeg Jets	2–1	Biron	3–2–2
8	27	Toronto Maple Leafs	4–2	Lundqvist	3–3–2
9	29	Ottawa Senators	5 – 4 (SO)	Lundqvist	3–3–3
10	31	San Jose Sharks	5–2	Biron	4–3–3

November: 9–2–0, 18 points (home: 6–0–0; road: 3–2–0)

Game	November	Opponent	Score	Decision	Record
11	3	Anaheim Ducks	2 – 1 (SO)	Lundqvist	5–3–3
12	5	Montreal Canadiens	5–3	Lundqvist	6–3–3
13	6	Winnipeg Jets	3–0	Biron	7–3–3
14	9	@ Ottawa Senators	3–2	Lundqvist	8–3–3
15	11	Carolina Hurricanes	5–1	Lundqvist	9–3–3
16	15	@ New York Islanders	4–2	Lundqvist	10–3–3
17	19	@ Montreal Canadiens	4–0	Biron	10–4–3
18	23	@ Florida Panthers	2–1	Lundqvist	10–5–3
19	25	@ Washington Capitals	6–3	Lundqvist	11–5–3
20	26	Philadelphia Flyers	2–0	Lundqvist	12–5–3
21	29	Pittsburgh Penguins	4–3	Lundqvist	13–5–3

December: 10–4–1, 21 points (home: 4–2–1; road: 6–2–0)

Game	December	Opponent	Score	Decision	Record
22	1	@ Carolina Hurricanes	5–3	Biron	14–5–3
23	3	@ Tampa Bay Lightning	4–2	Lundqvist	15–5–3
24	5	Toronto Maple Leafs	4–2	Lundqvist	15–6–3
25	8	Tampa Bay Lightning	3 – 2 (SO)	Lundqvist	15–6–4
26	10	@ Buffalo Sabres	4–1	Biron	16–6–4
27	11	Florida Panthers	6–1	Lundqvist	17–6–4
28	13	Dallas Stars	1–0	Lundqvist	17–7–4
29	15	@ St. Louis Blues	4–1	Lundqvist	17–8–4
30	17	@ Phoenix Coyotes	3–2	Biron	18–8–4
31	20	@ New Jersey Devils	4–1	Lundqvist	19–8–4
32	22	New York Islanders	4–2	Biron	20–8–4
33	23	Philadelphia Flyers	4–2	Lundqvist	21–8–4
34	26	New York Islanders	3–0	Lundqvist	22–8–4
35	28	@ Washington Capitals	4–1	Biron	22–9–4
36	30	@ Florida Panthers	4–1	Lundqvist	23–9–4

January: 8–3–1, 17 points (home: 4–2–0; road: 4–1–1)

Game	January	Opponent	Score	Decision	Record
37	2 (2012 NHL Winter Classic)	@ Philadelphia Flyers	3–2	Lundqvist	24–9–4
38	5	Florida Panthers	3 – 2 (OT)	Biron	25–9–4
39	6	@ Pittsburgh Penguins	3–1	Lundqvist	26–9–4
40	10	Phoenix Coyotes	2 – 1 (SO)	Lundqvist	27–9–4
41	12	Ottawa Senators	3–0	Lundqvist	27–10–4
42	14	@ Toronto Maple Leafs	3–0	Biron	28–10–4
43	15	@ Montreal Canadiens	4–1	Lundqvist	28–11–4
44	17	Nashville Predators	3–0	Lundqvist	29–11–4
45	19	Pittsburgh Penguins	4–1	Lundqvist	29–12–4
46	21	@ Boston Bruins	3 – 2 (OT)	Lundqvist	30–12–4
47	24	Winnipeg Jets	3–0	Lundqvist	31–12–4
48	31	@ New Jersey Devils	4 – 3 (SO)	Biron	31–12–5

February: 9–3–1, 19 points (home: 6–2–0; road: 3–1–1)

Game	February	Opponent	Score	Decision	Record
49	1	@ Buffalo Sabres	1 – 0 (SO)	Lundqvist	32–12–5
50	5	Philadelphia Flyers	5–2	Lundqvist	33–12–5
51	7	New Jersey Devils	1–0	Lundqvist	33–13–5
52	9	Tampa Bay Lightning	4 – 3 (OT)	Biron	34–13–5
53	11	@ Philadelphia Flyers	5–2	Lundqvist	35–13–5
54	12	Washington Capitals	3–2	Lundqvist	36–13–5
55	14	@ Boston Bruins	3–0	Lundqvist	37–13–5
56	16	Chicago Blackhawks	4–2	Biron	37–14–5
57	19	Columbus Blue Jackets	3 – 2 (OT)	Lundqvist	38–14–5
58	21	@ Pittsburgh Penguins	2–0	Lundqvist	38–15–5
59	24	@ New York Islanders	4 – 3 (SO)	Biron	38–15–6
60	25	Buffalo Sabres	3 – 2 (OT)	Lundqvist	39–15–6
61	27	New Jersey Devils	2–0	Lundqvist	40–15–6

March: 10–6–1, 21 points (home: 6–3–0; road: 4–3–1)

Game	March	Opponent	Score	Decision	Record
62	1	@ Carolina Hurricanes	3–2	Biron	41–15–6
63	2	@ Tampa Bay Lightning	4 – 3 (OT)	Lundqvist	41–15–7
64	4	Boston Bruins	4–3	Lundqvist	42–15–7
65	6	@ New Jersey Devils	4–1	Lundqvist	42–16–7
66	8	@ Ottawa Senators	4–1	Biron	42–17–7
67	9	@ Chicago Blackhawks	4–3	Lundqvist	42–18–7
68	11	New York Islanders	4 – 3 (OT)	Lundqvist	43–18–7
69	13	Carolina Hurricanes	4–2	Biron	44–18–7
70	15	Pittsburgh Penguins	5–2	Biron	44–19–7
71	17	Colorado Avalanche	3–1	Lundqvist	44–20–7
72	19	New Jersey Devils	4–2	Lundqvist	45–20–7
73	21	Detroit Red Wings	2 – 1 (OT)	Lundqvist	46–20–7
74	23	Buffalo Sabres	4 – 1	Lundqvist	46–21–7
75	24	@ Toronto Maple Leafs	4 – 3 (SO)	Lundqvist	47–21–7
76	27	@ Minnesota Wild	3 – 2	Lundqvist	48–21–7
77	28	@ Winnipeg Jets	4 – 2	Lundqvist	49–21–7
78	30	Montreal Canadiens	4 – 1	Lundqvist	50–21–7

April: 1–3–0, 2 points (home: 0–2–0; road: 1–1–0)

Game	April	Opponent	Score	Decision	Record
79	1	Boston Bruins	2 – 1	Lundqvist	50–22–7
80	3	@ Philadelphia Flyers	5 – 3	Lundqvist	51–22–7
81	5	@ Pittsburgh Penguins	5 – 2	Biron	51–23–7
82	7	Washington Capitals	4 – 1	Lundqvist	51–24–7

=== Detailed records ===
Eastern Conference
Opponent	Home	Away	Total	Pts.	Goals scored	Goals allowed
Atlantic Division
New Jersey Devils	2–1–0	1–1–1	3–2–1	7	14	12
New York Islanders	3–0–0	1–1–1	4–1–1	9	20	15
New York Rangers	–	–	–	–	–	–
Philadelphia Flyers	3–0–0	3–0–0	6–0–0	12	24	11
Pittsburgh Penguins	1–2–0	1–2–0	2–4–0	4	12	20
	9–3–0	6–4–2	15–7–2	32	70	58
Northeast Division
Boston Bruins	1–1–0	2–0–0	3–1–0	6	11	7
Buffalo Sabres	1–1–0	2–0–0	3–1–0	6	8	7
Montreal Canadiens	2–0–0	0–2–0	2–2–0	4	10	12
Ottawa Senators	0–1–1	1–1–0	1–2–1	3	8	14
Toronto Maple Leafs	0–2–0	2–0–0	2–2–0	4	11	11
	4–5–1	7–3–0	11–8–1	23	49	51
Southeast Division
Carolina Hurricanes	2–0–0	2–0–0	4–0–0	8	17	8
Florida Panthers	2–0–0	1–1–0	3–1–0	6	14	6
Tampa Bay Lightning	1–0–1	1–0–1	2–0–2	6	13	12
Washington Capitals	1–1–0	1–1–0	2–2–0	4	11	13
Winnipeg Jets	2–0–0	2–0–0	4–0–0	8	12	3
	8–1–1	7–2–1	15–3–2	32	67	42

Western Conference
Opponent	Home	Away	Total	Pts.	Goals scored	Goals allowed
Central Division
Chicago Blackhawks	0–1–0	0–1–0	0–2–0	0	5	8
Columbus Blue Jackets	1–0–0	0–0–0	1–0–0	2	3	2
Detroit Red Wings	1–0–0	0–0–0	1–0–0	2	2	1
Nashville Predators	1–0–0	0–0–0	1–0–0	2	3	0
St. Louis Blues	0–0–0	0–1–0	0–1–0	0	1	4
	3–1–0	0–2–0	3–3–0	6	14	15
Northwest Division
Calgary Flames	0–0–0	1–0–0	1–0–0	2	3	2
Colorado Avalanche	0–1–0	0–0–0	0–1–0	0	1	3
Edmonton Oilers	0–0–0	0–1–0	0–1–0	0	0	2
Minnesota Wild	0–0–0	1–0–0	1–0–0	2	3	2
Vancouver Canucks	0–0–0	1–0–0	1–0–0	2	4	0
	0–1–0	3–1–0	3–2–0	6	11	9
Pacific Division
Anaheim Ducks	1–0–0	0–0–1	1–0–1	3	3	3
Dallas Stars	0–1–0	0–0–0	0–1–0	0	0	1
Los Angeles Kings	0–0–0	0–0–1	0–0–1	1	2	3
Phoenix Coyotes	1–0–0	1–0–0	2–0–0	4	5	3
San Jose Sharks	1–0–0	0–0–0	1–0–0	2	5	2
	3–0–0	1–1–2	4–1–2	10	15	12

== Playoffs ==
The New York Rangers ended the 2011–12 regular season as the Eastern Conference's first seed. They faced the #8 seed Ottawa Senators in the first round. The Rangers battled back from a 3–2 series deficit to defeat the Senators in seven games. The Rangers defeated the #7 seed Washington Capitals their second round opponent, in seven games. In the Eastern Conference finals, the Rangers faced the #6 seed New Jersey Devils. After leading the series 2–1, the Rangers lost 3 games in a row and lost the series 4–2.

Key: Win Loss

2012 Stanley Cup playoffs

Eastern Conference quarterfinals: vs. (8) Ottawa Senators – Rangers win series 4-3
#	Date	Visitor	Score	Home	OT	Decision	Series
1	April 12	Ottawa Senators	2 – 4	New York Rangers		Lundqvist	Rangers lead series 1–0
2	April 14	Ottawa Senators	3 – 2	New York Rangers	OT	Lundqvist	Series tied 1–1
3	April 16	New York Rangers	1 – 0	Ottawa Senators		Lundqvist	Rangers lead series 2–1
4	April 18	New York Rangers	2 – 3	Ottawa Senators	OT	Lundqvist	Series tied 2–2
5	April 21	Ottawa Senators	2 – 0	New York Rangers		Lundqvist	Senators lead series 3–2
6	April 23	New York Rangers	3 – 2	Ottawa Senators		Lundqvist	Series tied 3–3
7	April 26	Ottawa Senators	1 – 2	New York Rangers		Lundqvist	Rangers win series 4–3

Eastern Conference Semi-finals: vs. (7) Washington Capitals – Rangers win series 4-3
#	Date	Visitor	Score	Home	OT	Decision	Series
1	April 28	Washington Capitals	1 – 3	New York Rangers		Lundqvist	Rangers lead series 1–0
2	April 30	Washington Capitals	3 – 2	New York Rangers		Lundqvist	Series tied 1–1
3	May 2	New York Rangers	2 – 1	Washington Capitals	3OT	Lundqvist	Rangers lead series 2–1
4	May 5	New York Rangers	2 – 3	Washington Capitals		Lundqvist	Series tied 2–2
5	May 7	Washington Capitals	2 – 3	New York Rangers	OT	Lundqvist	Rangers lead series 3–2
6	May 9	New York Rangers	1 – 2	Washington Capitals		Lundqvist	Series tied 3–3
7	May 12	Washington Capitals	1 – 2	New York Rangers		Lundqvist	Rangers win series 4–3

Eastern Conference finals: vs. (6) New Jersey Devils – Devils win series 4-2
#	Date	Visitor	Score	Home	OT	Decision	Series
1	May 14	New Jersey Devils	0 – 3	New York Rangers		Lundqvist	Rangers lead series 1–0
2	May 16	New Jersey Devils	3 – 2	New York Rangers		Lundqvist	Series tied 1-1
3	May 19	New York Rangers	3 – 0	New Jersey Devils		Lundqvist	Rangers lead series 2-1
4	May 21	New York Rangers	1 – 4	New Jersey Devils		Lundqvist	Series tied 2-2
5	May 23	New Jersey Devils	5 – 3	New York Rangers		Lundqvist	Devils lead series 3-2
6	May 25	New York Rangers	2 – 3	New Jersey Devils	OT	Lundqvist	Devils win series 4-2

== Player statistics ==
Skaters

Regular season
Player	GP	G	A	Pts	+/-	PIM
Marian Gaborik	82	41	35	76	15	34
Brad Richards	82	25	41	66	-1	22
Ryan Callahan	76	29	25	54	−8	61
Derek Stepan	82	17	34	51	14	22
Michael Del Zotto	77	10	31	41	20	36
Carl Hagelin	64	14	24	38	21	24
Artem Anisimov	79	16	20	36	12	34
Brandon Dubinsky	77	10	24	34	16	110
Ryan McDonagh	82	7	25	32	25	44
Dan Girardi	82	5	24	29	13	20
Brian Boyle	82	11	15	26	2	59
Ruslan Fedotenko	73	9	11	20	−7	16
Anton Stralman	53	2	16	18	9	20
Brandon Prust	82	5	12	17	-1	156
John Mitchell	63	5	11	16	10	8
Stu Bickel	51	0	9	9	2	108
Jeff Woywitka	27	1	5	6	2	8
Mike Rupp	60	4	1	5	-1	97
Steve Eminger	42	2	3	5	0	28
Marc Staal	46	2	3	5	−7	16
Erik Christensen^{‡}	20	1	4	5	0	2
Michael Sauer	19	1	2	3	9	21
Sean Avery	15	3	0	3	2	21
Mats Zuccarello	10	2	1	3	0	6
Wojtek Wolski^{‡}	9	0	3	3	−2	2
Tim Erixon	18	0	2	2	−2	8
Andre Deveaux	9	0	1	1	3	29
Kris Newbury	7	0	0	0	−1	24
Brendan Bell	1	0	0	0	−1	0
John Scott^{†}	6	0	0	0	−1	5

Playoffs
Player	GP	G	A	Pts	+/-	PIM
Brad Richards	20	6	9	15	-2	8
Dan Girardi	20	3	9	12	6	2
Marian Gaborik	20	5	6	11	0	2
Ryan Callahan	20	6	4	10	2	12
Artem Anisimov	20	3	7	10	1	4
Michael Del Zotto	20	2	8	10	-4	12
Derek Stepan	20	1	8	9	-2	4
Chris Kreider	18	5	2	7	-4	6
Ruslan Fedotenko	20	2	5	7	7	8
Marc Staal	20	3	3	6	0	12
Anton Stralman	20	3	3	6	1	4
Brian Boyle	17	3	3	6	0	15
Ryan McDonagh	20	0	4	4	2	11
Carl Hagelin	17	0	3	3	-3	17
Brandon Prust	19	1	1	2	-1	31
Brandon Dubinsky	9	0	2	2	2	14
John Mitchell	18	0	1	1	-2	2
Mike Rupp	20	0	0	0	-3	36
Stu Bickel	18	0	0	0	-3	16
Steve Eminger	4	0	0	0	0	0

Goaltenders

Regular season
Player	GP	TOI	W	L	OT	GA	GAA	SA	SV%	SO	G	A	PIM
Henrik Lundqvist	62	3754	39	18	5	123	1.97	1753	.930	8	0	2	4
Martin Biron	21	1220	12	6	2	50	2.46	519	.904	2	0	3	0

Playoffs
Player	GP	TOI	W	L	GA	GAA	SA	SV%	SO	G	A	PIM
Henrik Lundqvist	20	1251	10	10	38	1.82	554	.931	3	0	0	0

^{†}Denotes player spent time with another team before joining Rangers. Stats reflect time with Rangers only.
^{‡}Traded mid-season. Stats reflect time with Rangers only.

== Awards and records ==
=== Awards ===
Regular season
Player	Award	Awarded
Marian Gaborik	NHL Second Star of the Week	December 26, 2011
Marian Gaborik	NHL All-Star	January 12, 2012
Dan Girardi	NHL All-Star	January 12, 2012
Henrik Lundqvist	NHL All-Star	January 12, 2012
Carl Hagelin	NHL All-Star Rookie	January 25, 2012
Carl Hagelin	NHL All-Star Game Fastest Skater	January 28, 2012
Marian Gaborik	NHL All-Star Game MVP	January 29, 2012
Ryan Callahan	Steven McDonald Extra Effort Award	March 30, 2012
Henrik Lundqvist	Vezina Trophy	June 20, 2012

=== Nominations ===
Regular season
Player	Award	Nominated
Henrik Lundqvist	Vezina Trophy	April 25, 2012
Henrik Lundqvist	Hart Memorial Trophy	April 27, 2012
John Tortorella	Jack Adams Award	April 30, 2012
Henrik Lundqvist	Ted Lindsay Award	May 2, 2012
Ryan Callahan	Mark Messier Leadership Award	June 4, 2012

=== Milestones ===
Regular season
Player	Milestone	Reached
Tim Erixon	1st career NHL game	October 7, 2011
Brandon Prust	200th career NHL game	October 15, 2011
Mike Rupp	500th career NHL game	October 15, 2011
Brad Richards	500th career NHL assist	October 20, 2011
Brian Boyle	200th career NHL game	November 3, 2011
Ryan Callahan	300th career NHL game	November 15, 2011
Derek Stepan	100th career NHL game	November 23, 2011
Carl Hagelin	1st career NHL game 1st career NHL assist 1st career NHL point	November 25, 2011
Carl Hagelin	1st career NHL goal	November 26, 2011
New York Rangers franchise	2,500th win	December 10, 2011
Brad Richards	800th career NHL game	December 13, 2011
Marian Gaborik	300th career NHL goal	December 17, 2011
Stu Bickel	1st career NHL game 1st career NHL assist 1st career NHL point	December 20, 2011
Marian Gaborik	600th career NHL point	December 20, 2011
Artem Anisimov	200th career NHL game	December 30, 2011
Brandon Dubinsky	200th career NHL point	January 6, 2012
Dan Girardi	400th career NHL game	January 10, 2012
Wojtek Wolski	400th career NHL game	January 12, 2012
Marian Gaborik	300th career NHL assist	January 15, 2012
Dan Girardi	100th career NHL assist	January 21, 2012
Artem Anisimov	100th career NHL point	February 14, 2012
John Mitchell	200th career NHL game	February 24, 2012
Ryan Callahan	100th career NHL goal	February 25, 2012
Marian Gaborik	700th career NHL game	February 25, 2012
Ryan McDonagh	100th career NHL game	February 25, 2012
Ruslan Fedotenko	800th career NHL game	March 4, 2012
Tim Erixon	1st career NHL assist 1st career NHL point	March 23, 2012
Michael Del Zotto	200th career NHL game	March 30, 2012
Martin Biron	500th career NHL game	April 5, 2012

Playoffs
Player	Milestone	Reached
Artem Anisimov	1st career NHL playoff assist	April 12, 2012
Stu Bickel	1st career NHL playoff game	April 12, 2012
Brian Boyle	1st career NHL playoff game 1st career NHL playoff goal 1st career NHL playoff point	April 12, 2012
Michael Del Zotto	1st career NHL playoff game	April 12, 2012
Carl Hagelin	1st career NHL playoff game 1st career NHL playoff assist 1st career NHL playoff point	April 12, 2012
John Mitchell	1st career NHL playoff game	April 12, 2012
Anton Stralman	1st career NHL playoff game 1st career NHL playoff assist 1st career NHL playoff point	April 12, 2012
Michael Del Zotto	1st career NHL playoff assist 1st career NHL playoff point	April 14, 2012
Anton Stralman	1st career NHL playoff goal	April 14, 2012
Chris Kreider	1st career NHL playoff game 1st career NHL playoff game	April 16, 2012
Chris Kreider	1st career NHL playoff goal 1st career NHL playoff point	April 23, 2012
Derek Stepan	1st career NHL playoff goal 1st career NHL playoff assist 1st career NHL playoff point	April 23, 2012
Dan Girardi	1st career NHL playoff goal	April 26, 2012
Chris Kreider	1st career NHL playoff assist	April 28, 2012
Ruslan Fedotenko	100th career NHL playoff game	May 7, 2012
Brandon Prust	1st career NHL playoff goal	May 24, 2012

== Transactions ==
The Rangers have been involved in the following transactions during the 2011–12 season:

=== Trades ===
Date	Details
May 8, 2011	To Phoenix Coyotes Ethan Werek	To New York Rangers Oscar Lindberg
June 1, 2011	To Calgary Flames Roman Horak; Two 2nd-round picks (45th and 57th overall) in 2011	To New York Rangers Tim Erixon; 5th-round pick (134th overall) in 2011
June 25, 2011	To St. Louis Blues Evgeny Grachev	To New York Rangers 3rd-round pick (72nd overall) in 2011
June 25, 2011	To Nashville Predators 6th-round pick in 2012	To New York Rangers 6th-round pick (172nd overall) in 2011
July 2, 2011	To Nashville Predators Brodie Dupont	To New York Rangers Andreas Thuresson
November 8, 2011	To Washington Capitals Tomas Kundratek	To New York Rangers Francois Bouchard
February 3, 2012	To Minnesota Wild Erik Christensen; Conditional 7th-round pick in 2013	To New York Rangers Casey Wellman
February 25, 2012	To Florida Panthers Wojtek Wolski	To New York Rangers Michael Vernace; 3rd-round pick in 2013
February 27, 2012	To Chicago Blackhawks 5th-round pick in 2012	To New York Rangers John Scott

|}

=== Free agents signed ===
Player	Former team	Contract terms
Blake Parlett	Connecticut Whale	2 years, $1.075 million entry-level contract
Mike Rupp	Pittsburgh Penguins	3 years, $4.5 million
Brad Richards	Dallas Stars	9 years, $58.5 million
Brendan Bell	EHC Biel	1 year, $525,000
Andre Deveaux	Chicago Wolves	1 year, $525,000
Anton Stralman	Columbus Blue Jackets	1 year, $900,000
Marek Hrivik	Connecticut Whale	3 years, $1.925 million entry-level contract

=== Free agents lost ===
Player	New team	Contract terms
Alexander Frolov	Avangard Omsk	3 years
Jeremy Williams	Red Bull Salzburg	1 year
Matt Gilroy	Tampa Bay Lightning	1 year, $1 million
Vaclav Prospal	Columbus Blue Jackets	1 year, $1.75 million

=== Claimed via waivers ===
Player	Former team	Date claimed off waivers
Jeff Woywitka	Montreal Canadiens	October 6, 2011

=== Lost via waivers ===
Player	New team	Date claimed off waivers
Dale Weise	Vancouver Canucks	October 4, 2011

=== Lost via buyout ===
Player
Chris Drury

=== Player signings ===
Player	Date	Contract terms
Jason Wilson	May 12, 2011	3 years, $1.765 million entry-level contract
Christian Thomas	May 19, 2011	3 years, $2.515 million entry-level contract
Scott Stajcer	May 20, 2011	3 years, $1.86 million entry-level contract
Tim Erixon	June 1, 2011	3 years, $2.7 million entry-level contract
Chad Kolarik	June 17, 2011	2 years, $1.05 million
Dale Weise	June 27, 2011	1 year, $605,000
John Mitchell	June 30, 2011	1 year, $650,000
Ruslan Fedotenko	July 1, 2011	1 year, $1.4 million
Michael Sauer	July 8, 2011	2 years, $2.5 million
Artem Anisimov	July 8, 2011	2 years, $3.75 million
Brian Boyle	July 15, 2011	3 years, $5.1 million
Brandon Dubinsky	July 21, 2011	4 years, $16.8 million
Steve Eminger	July 25, 2011	1 year, $800,000
Ryan Callahan	July 27, 2011	3 years, $12.825 million
J. T. Miller	July 28, 2011	3 years, $2.775 million entry-level contract
Andrew Yogan	March 26, 2012	3 years, $1.965 million entry-level contract
Chris Kreider	April 10, 2012	3 years, $2.4 million entry-level contract

== Draft picks ==
New York's picks at the 2011 NHL entry draft in St. Paul, Minnesota.

Round	#	Player	Position	Nationality	College/junior/club team (league)
1	15	J. T. Miller	LW	United States	U.S. National Team Development Program (USHL)
3	72 (from St. Louis)	Steven Fogarty	C	United States	Edina High School (USHS-MN)
4	106	Michael St. Croix	C	Canada	Edmonton Oil Kings (WHL)
5	134 (from Calgary)	Shane McColgan	RW	United States	Kelowna Rockets (WHL)
5	136	Samuel Noreau	D	Canada	Baie-Comeau Drakkar (QMJHL)
6	172 (from Nashville)	Peter Ceresnak	D	Slovakia	Dukla Trenčín Jr. (Slovakia-Jr.)

== See also ==
- 2011–12 NHL season

== Farm teams ==
=== Connecticut Whale (AHL) ===
The 2011–12 season was the 15th season of AHL hockey for the franchise, and was the franchise's first full season as the Connecticut Whale.

=== Greenville Road Warriors (ECHL) ===
The 2011–12 season was the second season of affiliation for the Rangers and the Greenville Road Warriors.
