= 2011–12 Montreal Canadiens season =

NHL hockey team season

2011–12 Montreal Canadiens
- Division: 5th Northeast
- Conference: 15th Eastern
- 2011–12 record: 31–35–16
- Home record: 16–15–10
- Road record: 15–20–6
- Goals for: 212
- Goals against: 226

Team information
- General manager: Pierre Gauthier (Oct. 6 – Mar. 29); Vacant (Mar. 29 – Apr. 7)
- Coach: Jacques Martin (Oct. 6 – Dec. 17); Randy Cunneyworth (interim, Dec. 17 – Apr. 7)
- Captain: Brian Gionta
- Alternate captains: Hal Gill (Oct. – Feb.); Andrei Markov; Rotating (Feb. – Apr.)
- Arena: Bell Centre
- Average attendance: 21,273 (100.0%)

Team leaders
- Goals: Erik Cole (35)
- Assists: David Desharnais (44)
- Points: Max Pacioretty (65)
- Penalty minutes: P. K. Subban (119)
- Plus/minus: Josh Gorges (+14)
- Wins: Carey Price (26)

The 2011–12 Montreal Canadiens season was the team's 103rd season in franchise history and their 95th season in the National Hockey League (NHL) since the league was established on November 22, 1917. Finishing last place in their respective division and for the first time in franchise history finishing last in the conference, the Canadiens did not qualify for the 2012 Stanley Cup playoffs for the first time since the 2006–07 season.

== Off-season ==
Heading into the off-season, Canadiens general manager Pierre Gauthier had certain issues to address. There were several unrestricted free agents on the team that included, most notably Jeff Halpern, Roman Hamrlik, Alex Auld, Brent Sopel, Hal Gill, James Wisniewski, Mathieu Darche and Andrei Markov.

The team managed to re-sign Gill, Darche and Markov. On the other hand, no contracts were offered to Halpern, Auld and Sopel, thus allowing them to leave the team. Roman Hamrlik rejected the Canadiens's one-year offer and instead accepted a two-year contract with the Washington Capitals. James Wisniewski let it be known that he would be testing the free agent market (where a bidding war for his services would ensue). On June 29, his negotiating rights were traded to the Columbus Blue Jackets.

On the restricted free agent side, qualifying offers were made to Andrei Kostitsyn, Max Pacioretty, David Desharnais, Yannick Weber, Ryan White and Josh Gorges, and all were eventually re-signed. No qualifying offers were made to forwards Dustin Boyd, Tom Pyatt, Benoit Pouliot and defenceman Alexandre Picard, thus allowing them to become unrestricted free agents.

On the first day of free agency on July 1, Pierre Gauthier addressed two needs – a big-body forward and a reliable back-up goaltender. They were successful in their first objective in the signing of forward Erik Cole from the Carolina Hurricanes to a four-year, $18 million contract. Their need for a capable back-up goaltender to periodically relieve Carey Price was also fulfilled when they signed free agent Peter Budaj from the Colorado Avalanche to a two-year deal worth $2.3 million.

Another notable transaction during the off-season was the signing of rugged Russian defenceman Alexei Emelin to a one-year, two-way contract for the 2011–12 season. Emelin, drafted by the Canadiens in the third round with the 84th overall pick in the 2004 NHL entry draft, was under the Canadiens' radar for quite some time. He finally agreed to make the jump to North America when a clause was inserted in his contract, stating that he would be able to return to the Kontinental Hockey League (KHL) in Russia should he be unable to make the Canadiens' NHL roster. Emelin is often compared to fellow Russian and former NHL defenceman Darius Kasparaitis, who was known for his aggressive, physical playing style.

Assistant Coach Kirk Muller, who was part of the Canadiens' coaching staff since 2006, confirmed rumours that he was actively seeking a head coaching position in the NHL and would be leaving the team. On June 27, 2011, following his inability to find a head coaching position in the NHL, the Nashville Predators announced that Muller had been hired as the head coach of their American Hockey League (AHL) affiliate, the Milwaukee Admirals. He would later fulfill his dream when on November 28, 2011, Muller became coach of the Carolina Hurricanes, taking over for Paul Maurice.

Following Muller's departure, GM Pierre Gauthier announced the appointment of Randy Cunneyworth and Randy Ladouceur as assistant coaches. Cunneyworth and Ladouceur were coach and assistant coach respectfully for the Canadiens's AHL affiliate, the Hamilton Bulldogs, during the previous season. The addition of Ladouceur also provides the team the first former defenceman as an assistant coach since the 2005–06 season.

== Season timeline ==
=== October ===
The Canadiens started with the team's worst start since 1941. Prior to their first game of the season, defenceman Andrei Markov was placed on the injured reserved list. The Canadiens started the season with a 2–0 loss to the Toronto Maple Leafs at the Air Canada Centre. During the game, newly acquired defenceman Chris Campoli suffered a hamstring injury and was sidelined indefinitely.

The team's first win of the season was a 5–1 decision against the Winnipeg Jets at the MTS Centre, which was the Jets' first game in the newly relocated franchise's history.

The Canadiens played their home opener on October 13 in a 4–1 loss to the Calgary Flames. This coincided with Lars Eller's first game of the season following off-season shoulder surgery. That same day, the team announced that forward Ryan White had surgery for a sports hernia and would be sidelined indefinitely.

On October 23, the team traded long-time prospect Brock Trotter and their seventh round pick in the 2012 NHL entry draft to the Phoenix Coyotes for forward Petteri Nokelainen and defenceman Garrett Stafford.

The team would go on to a six-game losing streak and five-game losing streak at home until defeating the Philadelphia Flyers 5–1 on October 26, 2011, at the Bell Centre. Prior to the game, the Canadiens relieved Assistant Coach Perry Pearn of his duties, offering him another position in the organization, which he declined. Pearn was replaced behind the bench by Randy Ladouceur, who until then was situated in the press box during game time.

=== November ===
On November 10, the Canadiens beat the Phoenix Coyotes 3–2 in overtime to continue their winning streak in Phoenix. The Coyotes have not beaten the Canadiens at home ice since December 9, 1998, when they won 4–2.

Carey Price recorded back-to-back shutouts for the first time of his career in duplicate 4–0 wins against the Carolina Hurricanes on November 16 and the New York Rangers on November 19.

Max Pacioretty was suspended by NHL disciplinarian Brendan Shanahan for three games following a questionable hit on Pittsburgh Penguins defenceman Kris Letang on November 26 at the Bell Centre. Letang suffered a broken nose but still managed to finish the game. No penalty had been called on the hit.

The month also saw the NHL debuts of defenceman Frederic St. Denis on November 16 in a 4–0 win against the Carolina Hurricanes and Louis Leblanc on November 30 in a 4–1 loss to the Anaheim Ducks.

=== December ===
In an effort to bolster their power play, which was ranked 29th out of 30 teams in the league, GM Pierre Gauthier acquired defenceman Tomas Kaberle from the Carolina Hurricanes on December 9 in exchange for defenceman Jaroslav Spacek. In his first game with the Canadiens, Kaberle registered two assists, including one on the power play, in a 2–1 road win against the New Jersey Devils.

Chris Campoli returned to action on December 13 against the New York Islanders. He was sidelined with a lower body injury suffered during the team's season opener against the Toronto Maple Leafs back on October 6.

Feeling that the team was under performing with its 13–12–7 losing record, Pierre Gauthier fired Head Coach Jacques Martin on December 17. Assistant Coach Randy Cunneyworth was named interim head coach. Cunneyworth became the first unilingual, English-speaking active head coach of the Canadiens since Bob Berry, who was head coach from 1981 to 1984. Assistant general manager Larry Carriere was named assistant coach in a questionable move, as Carriere has never coached hockey at any level whatsoever. Cunneyworth's first game as the interim head coach resulted in a 5–3 loss against the New Jersey Devils at the Bell Centre on December 17.

Under interim coach Cunneyworth, the team embarked on a five-game losing skid until finally winning their first game under their new coach in a convincing 6–2 win against the Senators in Ottawa on December 27. Despite this win, the team dropped their next two games and closed off the month losing 7 of their last 8 games.

=== January ===
Lars Eller started off the new year in style on January 4 by scoring four goals (three in the third period alone) to help his team pounce the Winnipeg Jets 7–3 at the Bell Centre. Eller becomes the first Canadiens player to score four goals in one game since Jan Bulis did so against the Philadelphia Flyers back on January 26, 2006.

On January 12, goaltender Carey Price was invited to the 2012 NHL All-Star Game, which was played on January 29 in Ottawa. He was accompanied by teammate Raphael Diaz, who participated in the rookie skills competition held on January 28.

One day after Michael Cammalleri made disparaging remarks about the current status of the Montreal Canadiens, the Habs decided to part ways with the veteran forward. On January 12, Cammalleri was pulled out of a game against the Boston Bruins to find out that he had been traded to the Calgary Flames, along with goaltender Karri Ramo and a fifth round pick in 2012. In exchange, Montreal received forwards Rene Bourque, Patrick Holland and a second-round pick in 2013. Bourque carried a salary cap hit of $3.3 million until the 2015–16 season. This is Cammalleri's second tenure with the Flames, where he scored 39 goals during the 2008–09 season.

=== February ===
Max Pacioretty scored the first hat-trick of his career in a 4–2 win against the New York Islanders on February 9.

After being sidelined since the beginning of the season with a sports hernia, Ryan White finally made his season debut on February 15 against the Boston Bruins at the Bell Centre.

With their playoff hopes dying with each passing day, Pierre Gauthier became a seller. On February 17, Montreal sent defenceman Hal Gill and a conditional 2013 fifth-round draft pick to the Nashville Predators for a 2012 second-round pick, prospect Robert Slaney and Blake Geoffrion, the grandson of former Habs great Bernard Geoffrion and great-grandson of Canadiens legend Howie Morenz.

During the trade deadline on February 27, the Canadiens reacquired their fifth-round conditional pick in the Hall Gill trade, as well as the Predators' second-round pick in 2013 for forward Andrei Kostitsyn. They also claimed via re-entry waivers enforcer Brad Staubitz from the Minnesota Wild. Despite rumors to the contrary, Travis Moen and Chris Campoli, who were set to both become unrestricted free agents at the end of season, were not moved.

The Canadiens finished the month losing seven of their last eight games, including a five-game losing streak.

=== March and April ===
Max Pacioretty became the first American-born player in Canadiens history to reach the 30 goal mark during a 5–4 victory on March 8 against the Edmonton Oilers.

March 10 saw the return of defenceman Andrei Markov to the line-up. He registered an assist in the Canadiens 4–1 win against the Vancouver Canucks. Markov, who had been sidelined with a torn ACL, played his first game since November 13, 2010, missing almost 16 months of action.

Erik Cole scored a natural hat-trick just 5:41 after the opening faceoff on March 24 when the Habs defeated the Ottawa Senators 5–1. In turn, Cole became the second American-born player in Canadiens history to reach the 30-goal plateau. His effort also set a team record for the fastest natural hat-trick to start a game by any Canadiens player. Cole finished the season with a record-high 35 goals for an American-born player.

The Canadiens were officially eliminated from playoff contention in their 76th game of the season following a 4–1 loss to the Philadelphia Flyers on March 24.

On March 29, team owner Geoff Molson officially relieved Pierre Gauthier of his duties as general manager. Bob Gainey was also let go of his duties as special advisor to the GM. Molson further announced that former Habs GM Serge Savard would be acting as special advisor to find the next general manager.

April 1 saw the NHL debut of Gabriel Dumont in a winning cause against the Tampa Bay Lightning.

== Standings ==
Northeast Division
Pos	Team	GP	W	L	OTL	ROW	GF	GA	GD	Pts
1	y – Boston Bruins	82	49	29	4	40	269	202	+67	102
2	x – Ottawa Senators	82	41	31	10	35	249	240	+9	92
3	Buffalo Sabres	82	39	32	11	32	218	230	−12	89
4	Toronto Maple Leafs	82	35	37	10	31	231	264	−33	80
5	Montreal Canadiens	82	31	35	16	26	212	226	−14	78

Source: National Hockey League
x – Clinched playoff spot; y – Clinched division

Eastern Conference
Pos	Div	Team	GP	W	L	OTL	ROW	GF	GA	GD	Pts
1	AT	z – New York Rangers	82	51	24	7	47	226	187	+39	109
2	NE	y – Boston Bruins	82	49	29	4	40	269	202	+67	102
3	SE	y – Florida Panthers	82	38	26	18	32	203	227	−24	94
4	AT	x – Pittsburgh Penguins	82	51	25	6	42	282	221	+61	108
5	AT	x – Philadelphia Flyers	82	47	26	9	43	264	232	+32	103
6	AT	x – New Jersey Devils	82	48	28	6	36	228	209	+19	102
7	SE	x – Washington Capitals	82	42	32	8	38	222	230	−8	92
8	NE	x – Ottawa Senators	82	41	31	10	35	249	240	+9	92
9	NE	Buffalo Sabres	82	39	32	11	32	218	230	−12	89
10	SE	Tampa Bay Lightning	82	38	36	8	35	235	281	−46	84
11	SE	Winnipeg Jets	82	37	35	10	33	225	246	−21	84
12	SE	Carolina Hurricanes	82	33	33	16	32	213	243	−30	82
13	NE	Toronto Maple Leafs	82	35	37	10	31	231	264	−33	80
14	AT	New York Islanders	82	34	37	11	27	203	255	−52	79
15	NE	Montreal Canadiens	82	31	35	16	26	212	226	−14	78

Source: National Hockey League
x – Clinched playoff spot; y – Clinched division; z – Clinched conference

== Schedule and results ==
=== Pre-season ===
2011 Pre-season game log

#	Date	Opponent	Score	Decision	Location	Attendance	Record	Recap
1	September 20	Dallas Stars	3–6	Price	Montreal	21,273	0–1–0	
2	September 21	Buffalo Sabres	1–3	Mayer	Montreal	21,273	0–2–0	
3	September 23	Ottawa Senators	4–3 SO	Lawson	Ottawa	17,853	1–2–0	
4	September 24	Ottawa Senators	2–3	Price	Montreal	21,273	1–3–0	
5	September 25	Boston Bruins	3–7	Budaj	Halifax	10,595	1–4–0	
6	September 26	Boston Bruins	1–2	Price	Montreal	21,273	1–5–0	
7	September 29	Tampa Bay Lightning	0–4	Budaj	Montreal	21,273	1–6–0	
8	October 1	Tampa Bay Lightning	5–1	Price	Quebec City	15,176	2–6–0	

=== Regular season ===
2011–12 Game Log
October: 4–5–2, 10 Points (home: 2–3–2; road: 2–2–0)

#	Date	Opponent	Score	Decision	Location	Attendance	Record	Points	Recap
1	October 6	@ Toronto Maple Leafs	0–2	Price	Air Canada Centre	19,606	0–1–0	0	
2	October 9	@ Winnipeg Jets	5–1	Price	MTS Centre	15,004	1–1–0	2	
3	October 13	Calgary Flames	1–4	Price	Bell Centre	21,273	1–2–0	2	
4	October 15	Colorado Avalanche	5–6 SO	Price	Bell Centre	21,273	1–2–1	3	
5	October 18	Buffalo Sabres	1–3	Price	Bell Centre	21,273	1–3–1	3	
6	October 20	@ Pittsburgh Penguins	1–3	Price	Consol Energy Center	18,403	1–4–1	3	
7	October 22	Toronto Maple Leafs	4–5 OT	Price	Bell Centre	21,273	1–4–2	4	
8	October 24	Florida Panthers	1–2	Budaj	Bell Centre	21,273	1–5–2	4	
9	October 26	Philadelphia Flyers	5–1	Price	Bell Centre	21,273	2–5–2	6	
10	October 27	@ Boston Bruins	2–1	Price	TD Garden	17,565	3–5–2	8	
11	October 29	Boston Bruins	4–2	Price	Bell Centre	21,273	4–5–2	10	

November: 6–6–2, 14 Points (home: 2–2–2; road: 4–4–0)

#	Date	Opponent	Score	Decision	Location	Attendance	Record	Points	Recap
12	November 4	@ Ottawa Senators	2–1	Price	Scotiabank Place	20,329	5–5–2	12	
13	November 5	@ New York Rangers	3–5	Price	Madison Square Garden	18,200	5–6–2	12	
14	November 8	Edmonton Oilers	1–3	Price	Bell Centre	21,273	5–7–2	12	
15	November 10	@ Phoenix Coyotes	3–2 OT	Price	Jobing.com Arena	14,138	6–7–2	14	
16	November 12	@ Nashville Predators	2–1 OT	Budaj	Bridgestone Arena	17,113	7–7–2	16	
17	November 14	Buffalo Sabres	2–3 SO	Price	Bell Centre	21,273	7–7–3	17	
18	November 16	Carolina Hurricanes	4–0	Price	Bell Centre	21,273	8–7–3	19	
19	November 17	@ New York Islanders	3–4	Budaj	Nassau Coliseum	9928	8–8–3	19	
20	November 19	New York Rangers	4–0	Price	Bell Centre	21,273	9–8–3	21	
21	November 21	Boston Bruins	0–1	Price	Bell Centre	21,273	9–9–3	21	
22	November 23	@ Carolina Hurricanes	4–3 SO	Price	RBC Center	14,862	10–9–3	23	
23	November 25	@ Philadelphia Flyers	1–3	Price	Wells Fargo Center	19,991	10–10–3	23	
24	November 26	Pittsburgh Penguins	3–4 OT	Price	Bell Centre	21,273	10–10–4	24	
25	November 30	@ Anaheim Ducks	1–4	Budaj	Honda Center	13,237	10–11–4	24	

December: 4–7–3, 11 Points (home: 1–2–2; road: 3–5–1)

#	Date	Opponent	Score	Decision	Location	Attendance	Record	Points	Recap
26	December 1	@ San Jose Sharks	3–4 SO	Price	HP Pavilion	17,562	10–11–5	25	
27	December 3	@ Los Angeles Kings	2–1	Price	Staples Center	18,118	11–11–5	27	
28	December 6	Columbus Blue Jackets	2–3 SO	Price	Bell Centre	21,273	11–11–6	28	
29	December 8	Vancouver Canucks	3–4 SO	Price	Bell Centre	21,273	11–11–7	29	
30	December 10	@ New Jersey Devils	2–1	Price	Prudential Center	14,210	12–11–7	31	
31	December 13	New York Islanders	5–3	Price	Bell Centre	21,273	13–11–7	33	
32	December 15	Philadelphia Flyers	3–4	Price	Bell Centre	21,273	13–12–7	33	
33	December 17	New Jersey Devils	3–5	Price	Bell Centre	21,273	13–13–7	33	
34	December 19	@ Boston Bruins	2–3	Price	TD Garden	17,565	13–14–7	33	
35	December 21	@ Chicago Blackhawks	1–5	Budaj	United Center	22,081	13–15–7	33	
36	December 22	@ Winnipeg Jets	0–4	Price	MTS Centre	15,004	13–16–7	33	
37	December 27	@ Ottawa Senators	6–2	Price	Scotiabank Place	20,500	14–16–7	35	
38	December 29	@ Tampa Bay Lightning	3–4	Price	St. Pete Times Forum	19,204	14–17–7	35	
39	December 31	@ Florida Panthers	2–3	Price	BankAtlantic Center	20,098	14–18–7	35	

January: 5–4–2, 12 Points (home: 4–3–1; road: 1–1–1)

#	Date	Opponent	Score	Decision	Location	Attendance	Record	Points	Recap
40	January 4	Winnipeg Jets	7–3	Price	Bell Centre	21,273	15–18–7	37	
41	January 7	Tampa Bay Lightning	3–1	Price	Bell Centre	21,273	16–18–7	39	
42	January 10	St. Louis Blues	0–3	Price	Bell Centre	21,273	16–19–7	39	
43	January 12	@ Boston Bruins	1–2	Price	TD Garden	17,565	16–20–7	39	
44	January 14	Ottawa Senators	2–3 SO	Price	Bell Centre	21,273	16–20–8	40	
45	January 15	New York Rangers	4–1	Budaj	Bell Centre	21,273	17–20–8	42	
46	January 18	Washington Capitals	0–3	Price	Bell Centre	21,273	17–21–8	42	
47	January 20	@ Pittsburgh Penguins	4–5 SO	Budaj	Consol Energy Center	18,588	17–21–9	43	
48	January 21	@ Toronto Maple Leafs	3–1	Price	Air Canada Centre	19,643	18–21–9	45	
49	January 25	Detroit Red Wings	7–2	Price	Bell Centre	21,273	19–21–9	47	
50	January 31	Buffalo Sabres	1–3	Price	Bell Centre	21,273	19–22–9	47	

February: 5–8–1, 11 Points (home: 2–4–1; road: 3–4–0)

#	Date	Opponent	Score	Decision	Location	Attendance	Record	Points	Recap
51	February 2	@ New Jersey Devils	3–5	Price	Prudential Center	13,283	19–23–9	47	
52	February 4	Washington Capitals	0–3	Budaj	Bell Centre	21,273	19–24–9	47	
53	February 5	Winnipeg Jets	3–0	Price	Bell Centre	21,273	20–24–9	49	
54	February 7	Pittsburgh Penguins	3–2 SO	Price	Bell Centre	21,273	21–24–9	51	
55	February 9	@ New York Islanders	4–2	Price	Nassau Coliseum	12,312	22–24–9	53	
56	February 11	@ Toronto Maple Leafs	5–0	Price	Air Canada Centre	19,685	23–24–9	55	
57	February 13	Carolina Hurricanes	3–5	Price	Bell Centre	21,273	23–25–9	55	
58	February 15	Boston Bruins	3–4 SO	Price	Bell Centre	21,273	23–25–10	56	
59	February 17	@ Buffalo Sabres	4–3 SO	Price	First Niagara Center	18,690	24–25–10	58	
60	February 19	New Jersey Devils	1–3	Price	Bell Centre	21,273	24–26–10	58	
61	February 21	Dallas Stars	0–3	Price	Bell Centre	21,273	24–27–10	58	
62	February 24	@ Washington Capitals	1–4	Price	Verizon Center	18,506	24–28–10	58	
63	February 26	@ Florida Panthers	2–4	Budaj	BankAtlantic Center	18,108	24–29–10	58	
64	February 28	@ Tampa Bay Lightning	1–2	Price	St. Pete Times Forum	18,878	24–30–10	58	

March: 5–5–5, 15 Points (home: 3–1–2; road: 2–4–3)

#	Date	Opponent	Score	Decision	Location	Attendance	Record	Points	Recap
65	March 1	Minnesota Wild	5–4 SO	Price	Bell Centre	21,273	25–30–10	60	
66	March 3	Toronto Maple Leafs	1–3	Price	Bell Centre	21,273	25–31–10	60	
67	March 6	@ Calgary Flames	4–5	Price	Scotiabank Saddledome	19,289	25–32–10	60	
68	March 8	@ Edmonton Oilers	5–3	Budaj	Rexall Place	16,839	26–32–10	62	
69	March 10	@ Vancouver Canucks	4–1	Price	Rogers Arena	18,890	27–32–10	64	
70	March 12	@ Buffalo Sabres	3–4 OT	Budaj	First Niagara Center	18,690	27–32–11	65	
71	March 14	Ottawa Senators	3–2 SO	Price	Bell Centre	21,273	28–32–11	67	
72	March 16	@ Ottawa Senators	1–2 OT	Price	Scotiabank Place	20,500	28–32–12	68	
73	March 17	New York Islanders	2–3 SO	Budaj	Bell Centre	21,273	28–32–13	69	
74	March 21	@ Buffalo Sabres	0–3	Price	First Niagara Center	18,690	28–33–13	69	
75	March 23	Ottawa Senators	5–1	Price	Bell Centre	21,273	29–33–13	71	
76	March 24	@ Philadelphia Flyers	1–4	Budaj	Wells Fargo Center	19,931	29–34–13	71	
77	March 27	Florida Panthers	2–3 SO	Price	Bell Centre	21,273	29–34–14	72	
78	March 30	@ New York Rangers	1–4	Price	Madison Square Garden	18,200	29–35–14	72	
79	March 31	@ Washington Capitals	2–3 SO	Budaj	Verizon Center	18,506	29–35–15	73	

April: 2–0–1, 5 Points (home: 2–0–0; road: 0–0–1)

#	Date	Opponent	Score	Decision	Location	Attendance	Record	Points	Recap
80	April 4	Tampa Bay Lightning	5–2	Budaj	Bell Centre	21,273	30–35–15	75	
81	April 5	@ Carolina Hurricanes	1–2 (SO)	Budaj	RBC Center	17,836	30–35–16	76	
82	April 7	Toronto Maple Leafs	4–1	Budaj	Bell Centre	21,273	31–35–16	78	

Legend:

Win Loss Overtime/shootout loss

== Player statistics ==
=== Skaters ===
Regular season
Player	GP	G	A	Pts	+/-	PIM
Max Pacioretty	79	33	32	65	2	56
Erik Cole	82	35	26	61	11	48
David Desharnais	81	16	44	60	10	24
Tomas Plekanec	81	17	35	52	−15	56
P. K. Subban	81	7	29	36	9	119
Lars Eller	79	16	12	28	−5	66
Andrei Kostitsyn^{‡}	53	12	12	24	−8	16
Tomas Kaberle^{†}	43	3	19	22	−6	10
Michael Cammalleri^{‡}	38	9	13	22	−6	10
Yannick Weber	60	4	14	18	−7	30
Travis Moen	48	9	7	16	−3	41
Josh Gorges	82	2	14	16	14	39
Raphael Diaz	59	3	13	16	−7	30
Brian Gionta	31	8	7	15	−7	16
Mathieu Darche	61	5	7	12	−4	18
Scott Gomez	38	2	9	11	−9	14
Chris Campoli	43	2	9	11	−3	8
Louis Leblanc	42	5	5	10	3	28
Rene Bourque^{†}	38	5	3	8	−16	27
Hal Gill^{‡}	53	1	7	8	−7	29
Alexei Emelin	67	3	4	7	−18	30
Petteri Nokelainen	51	3	3	6	−5	37
Aaron Palushaj	38	1	4	5	1	8
Mike Blunden	39	2	2	4	−1	27
Andrei Markov	13	0	3	3	−4	4
Ryan White	20	0	3	3	−7	61
Frederic St. Denis	17	1	2	3	3	10
Jaroslav Spacek^{‡}	12	0	3	3	2	2
Blake Geoffrion^{†}	13	2	0	2	2	10
Brad Staubitz^{†}	19	1	0	1	2	48
Gabriel Dumont	3	0	0	0	−1	0
Andreas Engqvist	12	0	0	0	−1	4

=== Goaltenders ===
Regular season
Player	GP	TOI	W	L	OT	GA	GAA	SA	SV%	SO	G	A	PIM
Carey Price	65	3944	26	28	11	160	2.43	1914	.916	4	0	2	6
Peter Budaj	17	1037	5	7	5	44	2.55	508	.913	0	0	3	2

^{†}Denotes player spent time with another team before joining Canadiens. Stats reflect time with Canadiens only.
^{‡}Traded mid-season. Stats reflect time with Canadiens only.

== Suspensions/fines ==
Player	Explanation	Length	Salary	Date issued	Ref
Max Pacioretty	Illegal check to the head of Penguins defenceman Kris Letang	3 games	$26,351.34	November 28, 2011	
Lars Eller	Boarding Kings defenceman Drew Doughty	N/A	$2,500.00	December 10, 2011	
P.K. Subban	Dangerous trip against Penguins forward Chris Kunitz	N/A	$2,500.00	January 21, 2012	
Erik Cole	Slew-footing Oilers defenceman Jeff Petry	N/A	$2,500.00	March 9, 2012	

== Awards and records ==
=== Awards ===
Regular season
Player	Award	Awarded
Carey Price	NHL First Star of the Week	October 31, 2011
Carey Price	NHL First Star of the Week	November 21, 2011

=== Milestones ===
Regular season
Player	Milestone	Reached
Raphael Diaz	1st Career NHL Game	October 6, 2011
Alexei Emelin	1st Career NHL Game	October 9, 2011
Raphael Diaz	1st Career NHL Assist; 1st Career NHL Point	October 15, 2011
Andrei Kostitsyn	100th Career NHL Assist	October 15, 2011
Raphael Diaz	1st Career NHL Goal	October 18, 2011
Hal Gill	1,000th Career NHL Game	October 20, 2011
Michael Cammalleri	500th Career NHL Game	October 22, 2011
Carey Price	100th Career NHL Win	October 26, 2011
Mathieu Darche	200th Career NHL Game	October 30, 2011
Brian Gionta	200th Career NHL Assist	November 5, 2011
Petteri Nokelainen	200th Career NHL Game	November 5, 2011
Lars Eller	100th Career NHL Game	November 16, 2011
Travis Moen	100th Career NHL Point	November 16, 2011
Frederic St. Denis	1st Career NHL Game	November 16, 2011
Erik Cole	400th Career NHL Point	November 17, 2011
Tomas Plekanec	200th Career NHL Assist	November 17, 2011
P. K. Subban	100th Career NHL Game	November 21, 2011
Louis Leblanc	1st Career NHL Game	November 30, 2011
Louis Leblanc	1st Career NHL Assist; 1st Career NHL Point	December 3, 2011
Alexei Emelin	1st Career NHL Assist; 1st Career NHL Point	December 6, 2011
Frederic St. Denis	1st Career NHL Goal; 1st Career NHL Point	December 8, 2011
Tomas Plekanec	500th Career NHL Game	December 10, 2011
Michael Cammalleri	400th Career NHL Point	December 13, 2011
Andrei Kostitsyn	200th Career NHL Point	December 13, 2011
Chris Campoli	400th Career NHL Game	December 15, 2011
Louis Leblanc	1st Career NHL Goal	December 15, 2011
Josh Gorges	400th Career NHL Game	December 22, 2011
Erik Cole	200th Career NHL Goal	December 31, 2011
Alexei Emelin	1st Career NHL Goal	January 25, 2012
David Desharnais	100th Career NHL Game	February 2, 2012
Max Pacioretty	1st Career NHL Hat-trick	February 9, 2012
Aaron Palushaj	1st Career NHL Assist; 1st Career NHL Point	February 5, 2012
Yannick Weber	100th Career NHL Game	March 3, 2012
Max Pacioretty	100th Career NHL Point	March 6, 2012
Brad Staubitz	200th Career NHL Game	March 6, 2012
Scott Gomez	900th Career NHL Game	March 8, 2012
Aaron Palushaj	1st Career NHL Goal	March 17, 2012
Frederic St. Denis	1st Career NHL Assist	March 27, 2012
Erik Cole	700th Career NHL Game	April 4, 2012
Gabriel Dumont	1st Career NHL Game	April 4, 2012
Max Pacioretty	200th Career NHL Game	April 4, 2012

== Transactions ==
The Canadiens have been involved in the following transactions during the 2011–12 season:

=== Trades ===
Date	Details	
June 25, 2011	To Winnipeg Jets 3rd-round pick in 2011	To Montreal Canadiens 4th-round pick in 2011; 4th-round pick in 2011
June 29, 2011	To Columbus Blue Jackets James Wisniewski (Note: Trade of negotiating rights to.)	To Montreal Canadiens Conditional 5th-round pick in 2012 (Note: Condition satisfied.)
July 7, 2011	To Columbus Blue Jackets Ryan Russell	To Montreal Canadiens Mike Blunden
July 15, 2011	To Anaheim Ducks Mathieu Carle	To Montreal Canadiens Mark Mitera
October 23, 2011	To Phoenix Coyotes Brock Trotter; 7th-round pick in 2012	To Montreal Canadiens Petteri Nokelainen; Garrett Stafford
December 9, 2011	To Carolina Hurricanes Jaroslav Spacek	To Montreal Canadiens Tomas Kaberle
January 12, 2012	To Calgary Flames Michael Cammalleri; Karri Ramo; 5th-round pick in 2012	To Montreal Canadiens Rene Bourque; Patrick Holland; 2nd-round pick in 2013
February 17, 2012	To Nashville Predators Hal Gill; Conditional 5th-round pick in 2013 (Note: Condition satisfied.)	To Montreal Canadiens Blake Geoffrion; Robert Slaney; 2nd-round pick in 2012
February 27, 2012	To Nashville Predators Andrei Kostitsyn	To Montreal Canadiens 2nd-round pick in 2013; Cancellation of 5th-round pick (formerly conditional) in 2013

=== Free agents acquired ===
Player	Former team	Contract terms
Raphael Diaz	EV Zug	1 year, $900,000
Peter Budaj	Colorado Avalanche	2 years, $2.3 million
Erik Cole	Carolina Hurricanes	4 years, $18 million
Brock Trotter	Dinamo Riga	1 year, $550,000
Peter Delmas	Wheeling Nailers	3 years, $1.825 million entry-level contract
Nathan Lawson	New York Islanders	1 year, $525,000
Brian Willsie	Washington Capitals	1 year, $600,000
Jeff Woywitka	Dallas Stars	1 year, $650,000
Chris Campoli	Chicago Blackhawks	1 year, $1.75 million
Joe Callahan	Florida Panthers	1 year, $550,000

=== Free agents lost ===
Player	New team	Contract terms
Dustin Boyd	Barys Astana	undisclosed
Nigel Dawes	Barys Astana	undisclosed
Kyle Klubertanz	Djurgardens IF	2 years
Jeff Halpern	Washington Capitals	1 year, $875,000
J. T. Wyman	Tampa Bay Lightning	1 year, $525,000
Roman Hamrlik	Washington Capitals	2 years, $7 million
Benoit Pouliot	Boston Bruins	1 year, $1.1 million
Alex Auld	Ottawa Senators	1 year, $1 million
Alexandre Picard	Pittsburgh Penguins	1 year, $600,000
Tom Pyatt	Tampa Bay Lightning	1 year, $525,000
Drew MacIntyre	Buffalo Sabres	1 year, $525,000
Brent Sopel	Metallurg Novokuznetsk	2 years

=== Claimed via waivers ===
Player	Former team	Date claimed off waivers
+Blair Betts	Philadelphia Flyers	October 5, 2011
Brad Staubitz	Minnesota Wild	February 27, 2012

+On October 9, NHL commissioner Gary Bettman allowed the Montreal Canadiens to cancel the waiver claim on Betts and return him to the Philadelphia Flyers, as he had failed a physical due to an undisclosed injury which he had prior to being claimed.

=== Lost via waivers ===
Player	New team	Date claimed off waivers
Jeff Woywitka	New York Rangers	October 6, 2011

=== Player signings ===
Player	Date	Contract terms
Alexei Emelin	May 17, 2011	1 year, $984,200 entry-level contract
Joonas Nattinen	May 26, 2011	3 years, $1.895 million, entry-level contract
Hal Gill	May 31, 2011	1 year, $2.25 million
Andrei Kostitsyn	June 9, 2011	1 year, $3.25 million
Mathieu Darche	June 10, 2011	1 year, $700,000
Max Pacioretty	June 20, 2011	2 years, $3.25 million
David Desharnais	June 20, 2011	2 years, $1.7 million
Andrei Markov	June 23, 2011	3 years, $17.25 million
Yannick Weber	June 29, 2011	2 years, $1.7 million
Ryan White	July 13, 2011	1 year, $625,000
Frederic St. Denis	July 15, 2011	1 year, $605,000
Josh Gorges	July 22, 2011	1 year, $2.5 million
Jarred Tinordi	November 2, 2011	3 years, $2.7 million entry-level contract
Brendan Gallagher	November 16, 2011	3 years, $2.145 million entry-level contract
Michael Bournival	December 21, 2011	3 years, $2.07 million entry-level contract
Josh Gorges	January 1, 2012	6 years, $23.4 million contract extension
Morgan Ellis	March 1, 2012	3 years, $1.92 million entry-level contract
Patrick Holland	March 7, 2012	3 years, $1.92 million entry-level contract
Greg Pateryn	March 28, 2012	2 years, $1.325 million entry-level contract
Nathan Beaulieu	March 30, 2012	3 years, $2.775 million entry-level contract

== Draft picks ==
Montreal's picks at the 2011 NHL entry draft in St. Paul, Minnesota.

Round	#	Player	Position	Nationality	College/junior/club team (league)
1	17	Nathan Beaulieu	Defence	Canada	Saint John Sea Dogs (QMJHL)
4	97 (from Winnipeg)	Josiah Didier	Defence	United States	Cedar Rapids RoughRiders (USHL)
4	108 (from Winnipeg)	Oliver Archambault	Left wing	Canada	Val-d'Or Foreurs (QMJHL)
4	113 (from Anaheim)	Magnus Nygren	Defence	Sweden	Farjestad BK (Elitserien)
5	138	Darren Dietz	Defence	Canada	Saskatoon Blades (WHL)
6	168	Daniel Pribyl	Centre	Czech Republic	Sparta Prague Jr. (CZREP-JR.)
7	198	Colin Sullivan	Defence	United States	Avon Old Farms (USHS-MA)

== See also ==
- 2011–12 NHL season
