= 2011–12 Pittsburgh Penguins season =

NHL team season

2011–12 Pittsburgh Penguins
- Division: 2nd Atlantic
- Conference: 4th Eastern
- 2011–12 record: 51–25–6
- Home record: 29–10–2
- Road record: 22–15–4
- Goals for: 282
- Goals against: 221

Team information
- General manager: Ray Shero
- Coach: Dan Bylsma
- Captain: Sidney Crosby
- Alternate captains: Evgeni Malkin; Brooks Orpik; Jordan Staal
- Arena: Consol Energy Center
- Average attendance: 18,566

Team leaders
- Goals: Evgeni Malkin (50)
- Assists: Evgeni Malkin (59)
- Points: Evgeni Malkin (109)
- Penalty minutes: James Neal (87)
- Plus/minus: Kris Letang (+21)
- Wins: Marc-Andre Fleury (42)
- Goals against average: Marc-Andre Fleury (2.36)

The 2011–12 Pittsburgh Penguins season was the franchise's forty-fifth season in the National Hockey League (NHL). The Penguins, which was led by head coach Dan Bylsma and started the season without captain center Sidney Crosby, still managed a 51–25–6 record, an East-best 29 home wins, and 108-point average, which was second-best in the Eastern Conference.

== Background ==
In February, the team began the league's longest season winning streak and also saw the return of Crosby after missing more than forty games with concussion-like symptoms, before it saw its streak end in March at eleven games.

Center Evgeni Malkin was able to play in seventy-five games despite difficulties associated with recent knee surgery and recorded his greatest goal tally in a season (fifty) on the way to winning his second Art Ross Trophy. Marc-Andre Fleury tied a franchise record for goalie wins (226) in a victory against the Atlantic division winning-New York Rangers.

The fourth-seed Penguins saw its playoff run end when it lost to the same team that halted its regular-season winning streak, the Philadelphia Flyers, losing the first three games before its final loss in Game 6 of the Eastern Conference Semi-finals.

On April 27, Malkin was named as one of three finalists for the Hart Memorial Trophy, marking his third-career nomination for the award. On June 20 Malkin finished first in votes for the Hart Trophy, earning his first career MVP award.

== Pre-season ==
2011 Pre-season game log: 5–1–0 (Home: 3–0–0; Road: 2–1–0)

#	Date	Visitor	Score	Home	Record
1	September 21	Detroit Red Wings	2–3	Pittsburgh Penguins	1–0–0
2	September 22	Chicago Blackhawks	1–4	Pittsburgh Penguins	2–0–0
3	September 24	Minnesota Wild	1–4	Pittsburgh Penguins	3–0–0
4	September 27	Pittsburgh Penguins	3 – 2 (SO)	Los Angeles Kings	4–0–0
5	September 30	Pittsburgh Penguins	4–2	Chicago Blackhawks	5–0–0
6	October 2	Pittsburgh Penguins	2–3	Detroit Red Wings	5–1–0

== Regular season ==
=== Game log ===
Excluding 9 shootout-winning goals, the Penguins scored 273 goals overall, the most in the League.

2011–12 schedule
October: 8–3–2 (Home: 4–1–1; Road: 4–2–1), 18 Points

#	Oct	Time	Visitor	Score	Home	Location/Attendance	Record	Points
1	6	10:00 pm	Pittsburgh Penguins	4–3 SO	Vancouver Canucks	Rogers Arena (18,860)	1–0–0	2
2	8	10:00 pm	Pittsburgh Penguins	5–3	Calgary Flames	Scotiabank Saddledome (19,289)	2–0–0	4
3	9	9:00 pm	Pittsburgh Penguins	1–2 SO	Edmonton Oilers	Rexall Place (16,839)	2–0–1	5
4	11	7:30 pm	Florida Panthers	2–4	Pittsburgh Penguins	Consol Energy Center (18,503)	3–0–1	7
5	13	7:00 pm	Washington Capitals	3–2 OT	Pittsburgh Penguins	Consol Energy Center (18,512)	3–0–2	8
6	15	7:00 pm	Buffalo Sabres	3–2	Pittsburgh Penguins	Consol Energy Center (18,562)	3–1–2	8
7	17	8:30 pm	Pittsburgh Penguins	1–2	Winnipeg Jets	MTS Centre (15,004)	3–2–2	8
8	18	7:30 pm	Pittsburgh Penguins	4–2	Minnesota Wild	Xcel Energy Center (17,297)	4–2–2	10
9	20	7:00 pm	Montreal Canadiens	1–3	Pittsburgh Penguins	Consol Energy Center (18,403)	5–2–2	12
10	22	7:00 pm	New Jersey Devils	1–4	Pittsburgh Penguins	Consol Energy Center (18,535)	6–2–2	14
11	25	7:00 pm	Pittsburgh Penguins	3–0	New York Islanders	Nassau Coliseum (10,681)	7–2–2	16
12	27	7:00 pm	New York Islanders	2–3 SO	Pittsburgh Penguins	Consol Energy Center (18,461)	8–2–2	18
13	29	7:00 pm	Pittsburgh Penguins	3–4	Toronto Maple Leafs	Air Canada Centre (19,526)	8–3–2	18

November: 6–4–2 (Home: 4–0–1; Road: 2–4–1), 14 Points

#	Nov	Time	Visitor	Score	Home	Location/Attendance	Record	Points
14	3	10:30 pm	Pittsburgh Penguins	3–4 SO	San Jose Sharks	HP Pavilion at San Jose (17,562)	8–3–3	19
15	5	10:30 pm	Pittsburgh Penguins	3–2 SO	Los Angeles Kings	Staples Center (18,118)	9–3–3	21
16	11	7:00 pm	Dallas Stars	1–3	Pittsburgh Penguins	Consol Energy Center (18,585)	10–3–3	23
17	12	7:00 pm	Pittsburgh Penguins	3–5	Carolina Hurricanes	RBC Center (16,260)	10–4–3	23
18	15	7:30 pm	Colorado Avalanche	3–6	Pittsburgh Penguins	Consol Energy Center (18,483)	11–4–3	25
19	17	7:30 pm	Pittsburgh Penguins	1–3	Tampa Bay Lightning	St. Pete Times Forum (18,509)	11–5–3	25
20	19	7:30 pm	Pittsburgh Penguins	2–3	Florida Panthers	BankAtlantic Center (18,071)	11–6–3	25
21	21	7:00 pm	New York Islanders	0–5	Pittsburgh Penguins	Consol Energy Center (18,571)	12–6–3	27
22	23	7:00 pm	St. Louis Blues	3–2 OT	Pittsburgh Penguins	Consol Energy Center (18,583)	12–6–4	28
23	25	7:00 pm	Ottawa Senators	3–6	Pittsburgh Penguins	Consol Energy Center (18,610)	13–6–4	30
24	26	7:00 pm	Pittsburgh Penguins	4–3 OT	Montreal Canadiens	Bell Centre (21,273)	14–6–4	32
25	29	7:30 pm	Pittsburgh Penguins	3–4	New York Rangers	Madison Square Garden (18,200)	14–7–4	32

December: 7–6–0 (Home: 3–3–0; Road: 4–3–0), 14 Points

#	Dec	Time	Visitor	Score	Home	Location/Attendance	Record	Points
26	1	7:00 pm	Pittsburgh Penguins	2–1	Washington Capitals	Verizon Center (18,506)	15–7–4	34
27	3	7:00 pm	Pittsburgh Penguins	3–2	Carolina Hurricanes	RBC Center (17,696)	16–7–4	36
28	5	7:00 pm	Boston Bruins	3–1	Pittsburgh Penguins	Consol Energy Center (18,585)	16–8–4	36
29	8	7:00 pm	Pittsburgh Penguins	2–3	Philadelphia Flyers	Wells Fargo Center (19,936)	16–9–4	36
30	10	7:00 pm	Pittsburgh Penguins	6–3	New York Islanders	Nassau Coliseum (15,638)	17–9–4	38
31	13	7:00 pm	Detroit Red Wings	4–1	Pittsburgh Penguins	Consol Energy Center (18,592)	17–10–4	38
32	16	7:30 pm	Pittsburgh Penguins	4–6	Ottawa Senators	Scotiabank Place (19,710)	17–11–4	38
33	17	7:00 pm	Buffalo Sabres	3–8	Pittsburgh Penguins	Consol Energy Center (18,584)	18–11–4	40
34	20	7:30 pm	Chicago Blackhawks	2–3	Pittsburgh Penguins	Consol Energy Center (18,607)	19–11–4	42
35	23	8:30 pm	Pittsburgh Penguins	4–1	Winnipeg Jets	MTS Centre (15,004)	20–11–4	44
36	27	7:00 pm	Carolina Hurricanes	2–4	Pittsburgh Penguins	Consol Energy Center (18,600)	21–11–4	46
37	29	7:00 pm	Philadelphia Flyers	4–2	Pittsburgh Penguins	Consol Energy Center (18,602)	21–12–4	46
38	31	3:00 pm	Pittsburgh Penguins	1–3	New Jersey Devils	Prudential Center (17,625)	21–13–4	46

January: 8–4–0 (Home: 4–3–0; Road: 4–1–0), 16 Points

#	Jan	Time	Visitor	Score	Home	Location/Attendance	Record	Points
39	6	7:00 pm	New York Rangers	3–1	Pittsburgh Penguins	Consol Energy Center (18,590)	21–14–4	46
40	7	7:00 pm	New Jersey Devils	3–1	Pittsburgh Penguins	Consol Energy Center (18,594)	21–15–4	46
41	10	7:00 pm	Ottawa Senators	5–1	Pittsburgh Penguins	Consol Energy Center (18,603)	21–16–4	46
42	11	7:30 pm	Pittsburgh Penguins	0–1	Washington Capitals	Verizon Center (18,506)	21–17–4	46
43	13	7:30 pm	Pittsburgh Penguins	4–1	Florida Panthers	BankAtlantic Center (18,658)	22–17–4	48
44	15	1:00 pm	Pittsburgh Penguins	6–3	Tampa Bay Lightning	St. Pete Times Forum (19,204)	23–17–4	50
45	17	7:00 pm	Carolina Hurricanes	1–2 SO	Pittsburgh Penguins	Consol Energy Center (18,535)	24–17–4	52
46	19	7:00 pm	Pittsburgh Penguins	4–1	New York Rangers	Madison Square Garden (18,200)	25–17–4	54
47	20	7:00 pm	Montreal Canadiens	4–5 SO	Pittsburgh Penguins	Consol Energy Center (18,588)	26–17–4	56
48	22	12:30 pm	Washington Capitals	3–4 OT	Pittsburgh Penguins	Consol Energy Center (18,565)	27–17–4	58
49	24	8:00 pm	Pittsburgh Penguins	3–2 SO	St. Louis Blues	Scottrade Center (18,471)	28–17–4	60
All-Star Break
50	31	7:00 pm	Toronto Maple Leafs	4–5 SO	Pittsburgh Penguins	Consol Energy Center (18,550)	29–17–4	62

February: 8–4–1 (Home: 5–1–0; Road: 3–3–1), 17 Points

#	Feb	Time	Visitor	Score	Home	Location/Attendance	Record	Points
51	1	7:30 pm	Pittsburgh Penguins	0–1	Toronto Maple Leafs	Air Canada Centre (19,542)	29–18–4	62
52	4	1:00 pm	Pittsburgh Penguins	2–1	Boston Bruins	TD Garden (17,565)	30–18–4	64
53	5	1:00 pm	Pittsburgh Penguins	2–5	New Jersey Devils	Prudential Center (14,707)	30–19–4	64
54	7	7:30 pm	Pittsburgh Penguins	2–3 SO	Montreal Canadiens	Bell Centre (21,273)	30–19–5	65
55	11	2:00 pm	Winnipeg Jets	5–8	Pittsburgh Penguins	Consol Energy Center (18,602)	31–19–5	67
56	12	7:00 pm	Tampa Bay Lightning	2–4	Pittsburgh Penguins	Consol Energy Center (18,506)	32–19–5	69
57	15	7:00 pm	Anaheim Ducks	2–1	Pittsburgh Penguins	Consol Energy Center (18,482)	32–20–5	69
58	18	1:00 pm	Pittsburgh Penguins	6–4	Philadelphia Flyers	Wells Fargo Center (19,958)	33–20–5	71
59	19	12:30 pm	Pittsburgh Penguins	2–6	Buffalo Sabres	First Niagara Center (18,690)	33–21–5	71
60	21	7:00 pm	New York Rangers	0–2	Pittsburgh Penguins	Consol Energy Center (18,580)	34–21–5	73
61	25	1:00 pm	Tampa Bay Lightning	1–8	Pittsburgh Penguins	Consol Energy Center (18,596)	35–21–5	75
62	26	1:00 pm	Columbus Blue Jackets	2–4	Pittsburgh Penguins	Consol Energy Center (18,602)	36–21–5	77
63	29	7:30 pm	Pittsburgh Penguins	4–3 SO	Dallas Stars	American Airlines Center (17,455)	37–21–5	79

March: 11–3–1 (Home: 7–1–0; Road: 4–2–1), 23 Points

#	Mar	Time	Visitor	Score	Home	Location/Attendance	Record	Points
64	3	9:00 pm	Pittsburgh Penguins	5–1	Colorado Avalanche	Pepsi Center (18,007)	38–21–5	81
65	5	7:00 pm	Phoenix Coyotes	1–2	Pittsburgh Penguins	Consol Energy Center (18,540)	39–21–5	83
66	7	7:30 pm	Toronto Maple Leafs	2–3	Pittsburgh Penguins	Consol Energy Center (18,539)	40–21–5	85
67	9	7:00 pm	Florida Panthers	2–1 SO	Pittsburgh Penguins	Consol Energy Center (18,606)	41–21–5	87
68	11	12:30 pm	Boston Bruins	2–5	Pittsburgh Penguins	Consol Energy Center (18,609)	42–21–5	89
69	15	7:00 pm	Pittsburgh Penguins	5–2	New York Rangers	Madison Square Garden (18,200)	43–21–5	91
70	17	1:00 pm	Pittsburgh Penguins	5–2	New Jersey Devils	Prudential Center (17,625)	44–21–5	93
71	18	12:30 pm	Pittsburgh Penguins	2–3 SO	Philadelphia Flyers	Wells Fargo Center (19,927)	44–21–6	94
72	20	7:00 pm	Winnipeg Jets	4–8	Pittsburgh Penguins	Consol Energy Center (18,589)	45–21–6	96
73	22	7:00 pm	Nashville Predators	1–5	Pittsburgh Penguins	Consol Energy Center (18,579)	46–21–6	98
74	24	7:00 pm	Pittsburgh Penguins	4–8	Ottawa Senators	Scotiabank Place (20,076)	46–22–6	98
75	25	7:00 pm	New Jersey Devils	2–5	Pittsburgh Penguins	Consol Energy Center (18,601)	47–22–6	100
76	27	7:00 pm	New York Islanders	5–3	Pittsburgh Penguins	Consol Energy Center (18,588)	47–23–6	100
77	29	7:00 pm	Pittsburgh Penguins	3–5	New York Islanders	Nassau Coliseum (12,018)	47–24–6	100
78	30	7:30 pm	Pittsburgh Penguins	5–3	Buffalo Sabres	First Niagara Center (18,690)	48–24–6	102

April: 3–1–0 (Home: 2–1–0; Road: 1–0–0), 6 Points

#	Apr	Time	Visitor	Score	Home	Location/Attendance	Record	Points
79	1	7:30 pm	Philadelphia Flyers	6–4	Pittsburgh Penguins	Consol Energy Center (18,601)	48–25–6	102
80	3	7:30 pm	Pittsburgh Penguins	5–3	Boston Bruins	TD Garden (17,565)	49–25–6	104
81	5	7:00 pm	New York Rangers	2–5	Pittsburgh Penguins	Consol Energy Center (18,585)	50–25–6	106
82	7	4:00 pm	Philadelphia Flyers	2–4	Pittsburgh Penguins	Consol Energy Center (18,616)	51–25–6	108

Legend: = Win = Loss = OT/SO Loss

=== Standings ===
Atlantic Division
Pos	Team	GP	W	L	OTL	ROW	GF	GA	GD	Pts
1	New York Rangers	82	51	24	7	47	226	187	+39	109
2	Pittsburgh Penguins	82	51	25	6	42	282	221	+61	108
3	Philadelphia Flyers	82	47	26	9	43	264	232	+32	103
4	New Jersey Devils	82	48	28	6	36	228	209	+19	102
5	New York Islanders	82	34	37	11	27	203	255	−52	79

Source: National Hockey League

Eastern Conference
Pos	Div	Team	GP	W	L	OTL	ROW	GF	GA	GD	Pts
1	AT	z – New York Rangers	82	51	24	7	47	226	187	+39	109
2	NE	y – Boston Bruins	82	49	29	4	40	269	202	+67	102
3	SE	y – Florida Panthers	82	38	26	18	32	203	227	−24	94
4	AT	x – Pittsburgh Penguins	82	51	25	6	42	282	221	+61	108
5	AT	x – Philadelphia Flyers	82	47	26	9	43	264	232	+32	103
6	AT	x – New Jersey Devils	82	48	28	6	36	228	209	+19	102
7	SE	x – Washington Capitals	82	42	32	8	38	222	230	−8	92
8	NE	x – Ottawa Senators	82	41	31	10	35	249	240	+9	92
9	NE	Buffalo Sabres	82	39	32	11	32	218	230	−12	89
10	SE	Tampa Bay Lightning	82	38	36	8	35	235	281	−46	84
11	SE	Winnipeg Jets	82	37	35	10	33	225	246	−21	84
12	SE	Carolina Hurricanes	82	33	33	16	32	213	243	−30	82
13	NE	Toronto Maple Leafs	82	35	37	10	31	231	264	−33	80
14	AT	New York Islanders	82	34	37	11	27	203	255	−52	79
15	NE	Montreal Canadiens	82	31	35	16	26	212	226	−14	78

Source: National Hockey League
x – Clinched playoff spot; y – Clinched division; z – Clinched conference

=== Detailed records ===
Final

Eastern Conference
Atlantic	GP	W	L	OT	SHOTS	GF	GA	PP	PK	FO W–L
New York Rangers	6	4	2	0	196–177	20	12	2–17	3–20	151–205
Pittsburgh Penguins										
Philadelphia Flyers	6	2	3	1	193–157	20	22	3–22	6–29	207–163
New Jersey Devils	6	3	3	0	203–145	18	16	6–22	2–16	186–158
New York Islanders	6	4	2	0	211–157	23	15	4–22	3–24	181–166
Division Total	24	13	10	1	803–636	81	65	15–83	14–89	725–692

Northeast	GP	W	L	OT	SHOTS	GF	GA	PP	PK	FO W–L
Boston Bruins	4	3	1	0	133–121	13	9	4–16	1–10	130–122
Ottawa Senators	4	1	3	0	146–102	15	22	3–14	4–17	138–124
Buffalo Sabres	4	2	2	0	117–99	17	15	6–14	0–10	118–110
Toronto Maple Leafs	4	2	2	0	130–116	11	11	2–11	3–13	107–115
Montreal Canadiens	4	3	0	1	146–114	14	11	0–15	1–17	132–109
Division Total	20	11	8	1	672–552	70	68	15–70	9–67	625–580

Southeast	GP	W	L	OT	SHOTS	GF	GA	PP	PK	FO W–L
Florida Panthers	4	3	1	0	145–120	12	7	0–12	2–11	122–108
Washington Capitals	4	2	1	1	133–77	8	8	2–13	1–9	96–112
Tampa Bay Lightning	4	3	1	0	153–96	19	10	5–18	4–15	129–133
Winnipeg Jets	4	3	1	0	142–108	21	12	4–13	1–10	140–124
Carolina Hurricanes	4	3	1	0	173–102	12	10	1–10	1–13	107–133
Division Total	20	14	5	1	746–503	72	47	12–66	9–58	594–610
Conference Total	64	38	23	3	2221–1691	223	180	42–219	32–214	1944–1882

Western Conference
Central	GP	W	L	OT	SHOTS	GF	GA	PP	PK	FO W–L
St. Louis Blues	2	1	0	1	72–77	5	5	2–7	0–9	69–58
Nashville Predators	1	1	0	0	23–30	5	1	0–1	0–2	25–25
Detroit Red Wings	1	0	1	0	26–25	1	4	0–4	1–2	25–27
Chicago Blackhawks	1	1	0	0	28–38	3	2	1–7	0–3	37–30
Columbus Blue Jackets	1	1	0	0	40–24	4	2	2–5	0–2	37–32
Division Total	6	4	1	1	189–194	18	14	5–24	1–18	193–172

Northwest	GP	W	L	OT	SHOTS	GF	GA	PP	PK	FO W–L
Vancouver Canucks	1	1	0	0	28–36	4	3	2–3	0–3	27–32
Calgary Flames	1	1	0	0	37–20	5	3	2–5	0–3	36–39
Colorado Avalanche	2	2	0	0	61–63	11	4	1–10	0–6	52–62
Minnesota Wild	1	1	0	0	25–26	4	2	1–2	0–5	36–29
Edmonton Oilers	1	0	0	1	34–35	1	2	1–8	0–5	39–38
Division Total	6	5	0	1	185–180	25	14	7–28	0–22	190–200

Pacific	GP	W	L	OT	SHOTS	GF	GA	PP	PK	FO W–L
Phoenix Coyotes	1	1	0	0	28–37	2	1	0–1	0–2	25–34
San Jose Sharks	1	0	0	1	36–37	3	4	0–0	0–1	25–39
Los Angeles Kings	1	1	0	0	33–26	3	2	1–6	0–4	22–41
Dallas Stars	2	2	0	0	61–53	7	4	2–10	0–6	71–69
Anaheim Ducks	1	0	1	0	26–29	1	2	0–1	0–3	30–2
Division Total	6	4	1	1	184–182	16	13	3–18	0–16	173–185
Conference Total	18	13	2	3	558–556	59	41	15–70	1–56	556–557
NHL Total	82	51	25	6	2779–2247	282	221	57–289	33–270	2500–2439

== Stanley Cup playoffs ==
The Pittsburgh Penguins qualified for the Stanley Cup Playoffs for the sixth consecutive season, but lost in six games to the Philadelphia Flyers.

=== Playoff log ===
2012 Stanley Cup Playoffs
Eastern Conference quarterfinals vs No. 5 Philadelphia Flyers: Philadelphia wins series 4–2 (Home: 1–2; Road: 1–2)

#	Date	Visitor	Score	Home	OT	Pittsburgh goals	Opponent goals	Decision	Attendance	Series
1	April 11	Philadelphia	4–3	Pittsburgh	OT	Crosby, Kennedy, Dupuis	Briere, Briere, Schenn, **Voracek**	Fleury (0–1)	18,565	1–0
2	April 13	Philadelphia	8–5	Pittsburgh		Crosby, Kunitz, Martin, Kunitz, Kennedy	Talbot, Giroux, Giroux, Couturier, Couturier, **Jagr**, Couturier, Giroux	Fleury (0–2)	18,626	2–0
3	April 15	Pittsburgh	4–8	Philadelphia		Staal, Neal, Neal, Staal	Talbot, Briere, Briere, Read, **Read**, Simmonds, Giroux, Talbot	Fleury (0–3)	20,092	3–0
4	April 18	Pittsburgh	10–3	Philadelphia		Malkin, Niskanen, Crosby, **Staal**, Letang, Staal, Sullivan, Dupuis, Staal, Malkin	Giroux, Timonen, Voracek	Fleury (1–3)	20,172	3–1
5	April 20	Philadelphia	2–3	Pittsburgh		Sullivan, Staal, **Kennedy**	Carle, Hartnell	Fleury (2–3)	18,628	3–2
6	April 22	Pittsburgh	1–5	Philadelphia		Malkin	Giroux, **Hartnell**, Gustafsson, Briere, Schenn	Fleury (2–4)	20,127	4–2

Legend: = Win = Loss = Playoff series win Bold = Game Winning Goal

== Player statistics ==
Skaters

Regular season
Player	GP	G	A	Pts	+/−	PIM
Evgeni Malkin	75	50	59	109	18	70
James Neal	80	40	41	81	6	87
Chris Kunitz	82	26	35	61	16	49
Pascal Dupuis	82	25	34	59	18	34
Jordan Staal	62	25	25	50	11	34
Steve Sullivan	79	17	31	48	-3	20
Kris Letang	51	10	32	42	21	34
Matt Cooke	82	19	19	38	5	44
Sidney Crosby	22	8	29	37	15	14
Tyler Kennedy	60	11	22	33	10	29
Paul Martin	73	2	25	27	9	18
Matt Niskanen	75	4	17	21	9	47
Craig Adams	82	5	13	18	-6	34
Brooks Orpik	73	2	16	18	19	61
Deryk Engelland	73	4	13	17	10	56
Arron Asham	64	5	11	16	-5	76
Richard Park	54	7	7	14	-1	12
Joe Vitale	68	4	10	14	-5	56
Zbynek Michalek	62	2	11	13	0	24
Dustin Jeffrey	26	4	2	6	-4	2
Ben Lovejoy	34	1	4	5	3	13
Simon Despres	18	1	3	4	5	10
Alexandre Picard	17	0	4	4	4	4
Jason Williams	8	1	1	2	1	4
Eric Tangradi	24	0	2	2	-4	16
Cal O'Reilly	6	0	1	1	-4	0
Carl Sneep	1	0	1	1	1	0
Brian Strait	9	0	1	1	-2	4
Mark Letestu	11	0	1	1	-6	2
Colin McDonald	5	0	0	0	0	0
Steve MacIntyre	12	0	0	0	0	6
Robert Bortuzzo	6	0	0	0	1	2
Total		273	470	743	—	862

Playoffs
Player	GP	G	A	Pts	+/−	PIM
Jordan Staal	6	6	3	9	2	2
Evgeni Malkin	6	3	5	8	-1	6
Sidney Crosby	6	3	5	8	-3	9
Tyler Kennedy	6	3	3	6	1	2
Steve Sullivan	6	2	4	6	-4	4
Pascal Dupuis	6	2	4	6	0	0
Chris Kunitz	6	2	4	6	-2	8
James Neal	5	2	4	6	-3	12
Kris Letang	6	1	4	5	-1	21
Matt Cooke	6	0	4	4	3	16
Matt Niskanen	4	1	2	3	2	6
Paul Martin	3	1	0	1	-1	0
Richard Park	2	0	1	1	-1	2
Deryk Engelland	6	0	1	1	1	14
Zbynek Michalek	6	0	1	1	2	0
Eric Tangradi	2	0	1	1	2	0
Arron Asham	3	0	0	0	-3	10
Craig Adams	5	0	0	0	-1	19
Brooks Orpik	6	0	0	0	-2	4
Joe Vitale	4	0	0	0	-2	12
Brian Strait	3	0	0	0	3	0
Ben Lovejoy	2	0	0	0	-2	0
Simon Despres	3	0	0	0	2	2
Total		26	46	72	—	149

Goaltenders

Regular season
Player	GP	GS	TOI	W	L	OT	GA	GAA	SA	SV%	SO	G	A	PIM
Marc-Andre Fleury	67	64	3896:13	42	17	4	153	2.36	1768	0.913	3	0	2	4
Brent Johnson	16	14	811:05	6	7	2	42	3.11	359	0.883	0	0	1	0
Brad Thiessen	5	4	257:44	3	1	0	16	3.72	113	0.858	0	0	0	2
Total		82	4965:02	51	25	6	211	2.55	2240	0.906	3	0	3	6

Playoffs
Player	GP	GS	TOI	W	L	OT	GA	GAA	SA	SV%	SO	G	A	PIM
Marc-Andre Fleury	6	6	337:08	2	4	--	26	4.63	157	0.834	0	0	1	0
Brent Johnson	1	0	20:00	0	0	--	2	6.00	6	0.667	0	0	0	0
Total		6	357:08	2	4	0	28	4.71	163	0.828	0	0	1	0

^{†}Denotes player spent time with another team before joining the Penguins. Stats reflect time with the Penguins only.
^{‡}Denotes player was traded mid-season. Stats reflect time with the Penguins only.

== Notable achievements ==
=== Awards ===
Regular season
Player	Award	Awarded
Sidney Crosby	NHL First Star of the Week	November 28, 2011
Evgeni Malkin	NHL Third Star of the Week	December 19, 2011
Evgeni Malkin	NHL First Star of the Month	December 2011
Evgeni Malkin	NHL Third Star of the Week	January 16, 2012
Evgeni Malkin	NHL First Star of the Week	January 23, 2012
Evgeni Malkin	NHL All Star Game	January 29, 2012
Kris Letang	NHL All Star Game	January 29, 2012
James Neal	NHL All Star Game	January 29, 2012
Evgeni Malkin	NHL Second Star of the Month	January 2012
Evgeni Malkin	NHL Second Star of the Week	February 13, 2012
Evgeni Malkin	NHL First Star of the Week	March 26, 2012
Evgeni Malkin	NHL Second Star of the Month	March 2012
Sidney Crosby	NHL Third Star of the Week	April 9, 2012

Postseason
Player	Award	Awarded
Evgeni Malkin	Hart Memorial Trophy Nominee	April 27, 2012
Evgeni Malkin	Hart Memorial Trophy Winner	June 20, 2012
Evgeni Malkin	Art Ross Trophy Winner	June 20, 2012
Evgeni Malkin	Ted Lindsay Award Winner	June 20, 2012

=== Team awards ===
Awarded on April 5, 2012

Player	Award	Notes
Marc-Andre Fleury; Pascal Dupuis	Baz Bastien Memorial Award	Presented by the Pittsburgh Chapter of the Professional Hockey Writers Association to the player who the local media of the PHWA want to acknowledge for his cooperation throughout the year. The award is presented in memory of the late Aldege "Baz" Bastien, Penguins general manager from 1976 to 1983. Sponsor: UPMC Sports medicine
Matt Cooke	Bill Masterton Memorial Trophy nominee	The Pittsburgh Chapter of the Professional Hockey Writers Association votes for the Penguins' Masterton nominee. Each NHL team selects a Masterton candidate from which the overall winner is chosen. The Masterton candidate is nominated as the player who best exemplifies the qualities of perseverance, sportsmanship and dedication to hockey. Sponsor: Trib Total Media
Evgeni Malkin	A. T. Caggiano Memorial Booster Club Cup	Presented in memory of A.T. Caggiano, long-time Penguins' locker room attendant & Booster Club supporter, the award is presented by Penguins Booster Club members, who vote for the three stars after every home game and tally votes at the end of the regular season.
Brooks Orpik	Player's Player Award	The players hold a vote at the end of the season for the player they feel exemplifies leadership for the team, both on and off the ice, a player dedicated to teamwork. Sponsor: Highmark Blue Cross Blue Shield
Evgeni Malkin	Edward J. DeBartolo Award	The award recognizes the player who has donated a tremendous amount of time and effort during the season working on community and charity projects. Sponsor: Verizon Wireless
Brooks Orpik; Marc-Andre Fleury	Defensive Player of the Year	This award honors the defensive skills of an individual player on the team. Sponsor: PNC Wealth Management
Evgeni Malkin	Most Valuable Player	Based on the overall contribution the player makes to the team. Sponsor: CONSOL Energy

=== Milestones ===
Regular season
Player	Milestone	Reached
Kris Letang	300th Career NHL Game	October 6, 2011
Jordan Staal	200th Career NHL Point	October 8, 2011
Matt Niskanen	300th Career NHL Game	October 13, 2011
Aaron Asham	700th Career NHL Game	October 20, 2011
Jordan Staal	100th Career NHL Goal	October 22, 2011
Steve Sullivan	900th Career NHL Game	October 22, 2011
Robert Bortuzzo	1st Career NHL Game	November 5, 2011
Chris Kunitz	300th Career NHL Point	November 12, 2011
Richard Park	700th Career NHL Game	November 15, 2011
Zbynek Michalek	500th Career NHL Game	November 23, 2011
Paul Martin	500th Career NHL Game	November 25, 2011
Simon Despres	1st Career NHL Game; 1st Career NHL Assist; 1st Career NHL Point	December 1, 2011
Brent Johnson	300th Career NHL Game	December 3, 2011
Deryk Engelland	100th Career NHL Game	December 10, 2011
Matt Cooke	1,000th Career NHL PIM	December 10, 2011
Craig Adams	700th Career NHL Game	December 13, 2011
Pascal Dupuis	700th Career NHL Game	December 16, 2011
Aaron Asham	200th Career NHL Point	December 16, 2011
Pascal Dupuis	300th Career NHL Point	December 17, 2011
Marc-Andre Fleury	200th Career NHL Win	December 17, 2011
Brooks Orpik	100th Career NHL Point	December 17, 2011
Simon Despres	1st Career NHL Goal	December 17, 2011
Carl Sneep	1st Career NHL Game; 1st Career NHL Assist; 1st Career NHL Point	December 17, 2011
Matt Niskanen	100th Career NHL point	December 20, 2011
Steve Sullivan	700th Career NHL Point	December 23, 2011
Jordan Staal	400th Career NHL Game	December 27, 2011
Marc-Andre Fleury	400th Career NHL Game	January 7, 2012
Tyler Kennedy	300th Career NHL Game	January 17, 2012
Paul Martin	200th Career NHL Point	January 17, 2012
Chris Kunitz	500th Career NHL Game	January 24, 2012
James Neal	100th Career NHL Goal	January 24, 2012
Evgeni Malkin	400th Career NHL Game	February 11, 2012
Richard Park	100th Career NHL Goal	February 11, 2012
Evgeni Malkin	300th Career NHL Assist	February 21, 2012
Brad Thiessen	1st Career NHL Game; 1st Career NHL Win	February 26, 2012
James Neal	300th Career NHL Game	March 7, 2012
Evgeni Malkin	500th Career NHL Point	March 11, 2012
James Neal	200th Career NHL Point	March 11, 2012
James Neal	100th Career NHL Assist	March 15, 2012
Evgeni Malkin	200th Career NHL Goal	March 20, 2012
Sidney Crosby	600th Career NHL Point	March 30, 2012
Brooks Orpik	100th Career NHL Assist	March 30, 2012
Chris Kunitz	200th Career NHL Assist	April 5, 2012

Playoffs
Player	Milestone	Reached
Eric Tangradi	1st Career NHL Playoff Assist; 1st Career NHL Playoff Point	April 18, 2012
Deryk Engelland	1st Career NHL Playoff Assist; 1st Career NHL Playoff Point	April 18, 2012

== Transactions ==
The Penguins have been involved in the following transactions during the 2011–12 season:

=== Trades ===
November 8, 2011	To Columbus Blue Jackets: Mark Letestu	To Pittsburgh: 4th-round pick in 2012
June 4, 2012	To Washington Capitals: 7th-round pick in 2012	To Pittsburgh: Tomas Vokoun

=== Free agents acquired ===
Player	Former team	Contract terms
Zach Sill	Wilkes-Barre/Scranton Penguins	2 years/$1.07 million (entry-level)
Steve Sullivan	Nashville Predators	1 year/$1.5 million
Colin McDonald	Oklahoma City Barons	1 year/$525,000 (two-way)
Boris Valabik	Providence Bruins	1 year/$550,000 (two-way)
Alexandre Picard	Montreal Canadiens	1 year/$600,000 (two-way)
Steve MacIntyre	Edmonton Oilers	1 year/$600,000 (two-way)
Scott Munroe	Neftekhimik Nizhnekamsk	1 year/$525,000 (two-way)
Jason Williams	Dallas Stars	1 year/$600,000 (two-way)
Richard Park	Geneve-Servette HC	1 year/$550,000 (two-way)
Adam Payerl	Belleville Bulls	3 years, $1.83 million (entry-level)

=== Free agents lost ===
Player	New team	Contract terms
Steve Wagner	Adler Mannheim	1 year
John Curry	Hamburg Freezers	1 year
Andrew Hutchinson	Barys Astana	1 year
Mike Rupp	New York Rangers	3 years/$4.5 million
Maxime Talbot	Philadelphia Flyers	5 years/$9 million
Corey Potter	Edmonton Oilers	1 year/$525,000 (two-way)
Brett Sterling	St. Louis Blues	1 year/$600,000 (two-way)
Chris Conner	Detroit Red Wings	1 year/$550,000 (two-way)
Eric Godard	Dallas Stars	2 years/$1.45 million (two-way in first year)
Tim Wallace	New York Islanders	1 year/$700,000 (two-way)
Alexei Kovalev	Atlant Mytishchi	2 years
Jason Williams	HC Ambri-Piotta	2-year
Mattias Modig	Växjö Lakers	2-year

=== Claimed via waivers ===
Player	Previous team	Date
Cal O'Reilly	Phoenix Coyotes	February 1, 2012

=== Lost via waivers ===
Player	New team	Date
Nick Johnson	Minnesota Wild	September 29, 2011

=== Player signings ===
Player	Date	Contract terms
Nick Johnson	June 4, 2011	1 year/$550,000 (two-way)
Craig Adams	June 9, 2011	2 years/$1.35 million
Ryan Craig	June 13, 2011	1 year/$525,000 (two-way)
Pascal Dupuis	June 28, 2011	2 years/$3 million
Arron Asham	June 29, 2011	1 year/$775,000
Tyler Kennedy	July 1, 2011	2 years/$4 million
Brad Thiessen	July 5, 2011	1 year/$525,000 (two-way)
Dustin Jeffrey	July 12, 2011	2 years/$1.15 million (two-way in first year)
Scott Harrington	July 26, 2011	3 years/$1.8525 million (entry-level)
Joe Morrow	August 3, 2011	3 years/$2.775 million (entry-level)
Chris Kunitz	October 13, 2011	2 years/$7.45 million (contract extension)
Joe Vitale	February 3, 2012	2 years/$1.1 million (contract extension)
James Neal	February 19, 2012	6 years/$30 million (contract extension)
Beau Bennett	April 13, 2012	3 years/$2.7 million (entry-level)
Reid McNeill	May 15, 2012	3 years/$1.675 million (entry-level)
Dominik Uher	June 1, 2012	3 years/$1.755 million (entry-level)
Tomas Vokoun	June 4, 2012	2 years/$4 million

== Draft picks ==
The Penguins' selected five players at the 2011 NHL entry draft.

Round	Pick #	Player	Position	Nationality	College/junior/club team (league)
1	23	Joe Morrow	Defense	Canada	Portland Winterhawks (WHL)
2	54	Scott Harrington	Defense	Canada	London Knights (OHL)
5	144	Dominik Uher	Center	Czech Republic	Spokane Chiefs (WHL)
6	174	Josh Archibald	Wing	Canada	Brainerd High School (USHS-MN)
7	209^{[a]}	Scott Wilson	Center	Canada	Georgetown Raiders (OJHL)

Draft notes

- The Penguins' third-round pick went to the Phoenix Coyotes as the result of a trade on June 7, 2011, that sent Ilya Bryzgalov to the Philadelphia Flyers in exchange for Matt Clackson, future considerations and this conditional pick. The condition – Philadelphia signs Bryzgalov before the start of the third round of the draft – was converted on June 23, 2011. Philadelphia previously acquired the pick as the result of a trade on June 25, 2010 that sent Dan Hamhuis to Pittsburgh in exchange for this pick.
- The Penguins' fourth-round pick went to the Edmonton Oilers as the result of a trade on January 17, 2009, that sent Mathieu Garon to Pittsburgh in exchange for Dany Sabourin, Ryan Stone and this pick.
- The Penguins' seventh-round pick went to the Ottawa Senators as the result of a February 24, 2011, trade that sent Alexei Kovalev to the Penguins in exchange for this pick, the specific pick being conditional at the time of the trade. The condition – Pittsburgh does not advance to the 2011 Eastern Conference Semi-finals – was converted on April 27, 2011.
- ^{a} The San Jose Sharks' seventh-round pick went to the Penguins as the result of a trade on June 26, 2010, that sent a seventh-round pick in 2010 to San Jose in exchange for this pick.

== See also ==
- 2011–12 NHL season
- 2012 Stanley Cup playoffs
