= 2011–12 Washington Capitals season =

NHL hockey team season

2011–12 Washington Capitals
- Division: 2nd Southeast
- Conference: 7th Eastern
- 2011–12 record: 42–32–8
- Home record: 26–11–4
- Road record: 16–21–4
- Goals for: 222
- Goals against: 230

Team information
- General manager: George McPhee
- Coach: Bruce Boudreau (Oct.–Nov.); Dale Hunter (Nov.–May.)
- Captain: Alexander Ovechkin
- Alternate captains: Nicklas Backstrom; Mike Knuble; Troy Brouwer (Feb.–May.); Brooks Laich (Feb.–May.)
- Arena: Verizon Center
- Average attendance: 18,506 (100%)

Team leaders
- Goals: Alexander Ovechkin (38)
- Assists: Dennis Wideman (35)
- Points: Alexander Ovechkin (65)
- Penalty minutes: Matt Hendricks (93)
- Plus/minus: Karl Alzner (+12)
- Wins: Tomas Vokoun (25)
- Goals against average: Tomas Vokoun (2.51)

The 2011–12 Washington Capitals season was the franchise's 38th season in the National Hockey League (NHL). Washington finished the year as the seventh place team in the Eastern Conference. In the opening round of the playoffs, they matched up with the defending Stanley Cup champion Boston Bruins. Due to injuries, the Capitals were forced to play rookie goaltender Braden Holtby. Washington's defeat of the Bruins marked the first time in NHL history in which all seven games of a series were decided by one goal. Facing the East's top seed in the Conference Semi-finals, Washington was defeated in seven games by the New York Rangers. Holtby was lauded for his playoff performance, where he recorded a .935 save percentage and was credited with putting Washington in a position to win each game.

Washington won their first seven games, setting a franchise record for consecutive victories to start a season. Shortly after, however, an early season slump prompted the benching of offensive star players Alexander Ovechkin and Alexander Semin in separate games. The moves failed to produce results, and Head Coach Bruce Boudreau was eventually replaced by Dale Hunter. Boudreau's firing came seven days after he won his 200th game as an NHL head coach, achieving the feat faster anyone in NHL history. Under Hunter, the Capitals battled the Florida Panthers for the Southeast Division title, ultimately losing out on their fifth-straight division title on the final day of the season. Two days after Washington's playoff elimination, Hunter stepped down as head coach; Adam Oates was hired as his replacement.

Individually, Alexander Ovechkin and Dennis Wideman were named to the All-Star Game. Due to a suspension for a reckless hit, however, Ovechkin elected not to attend the game to avoid being a distraction. Four Capitals were named one of the NHL's weekly three stars – a total of five times throughout the season. Three players made their NHL debut, while Mike Knuble played in his 1,000th game.

== Off-season ==
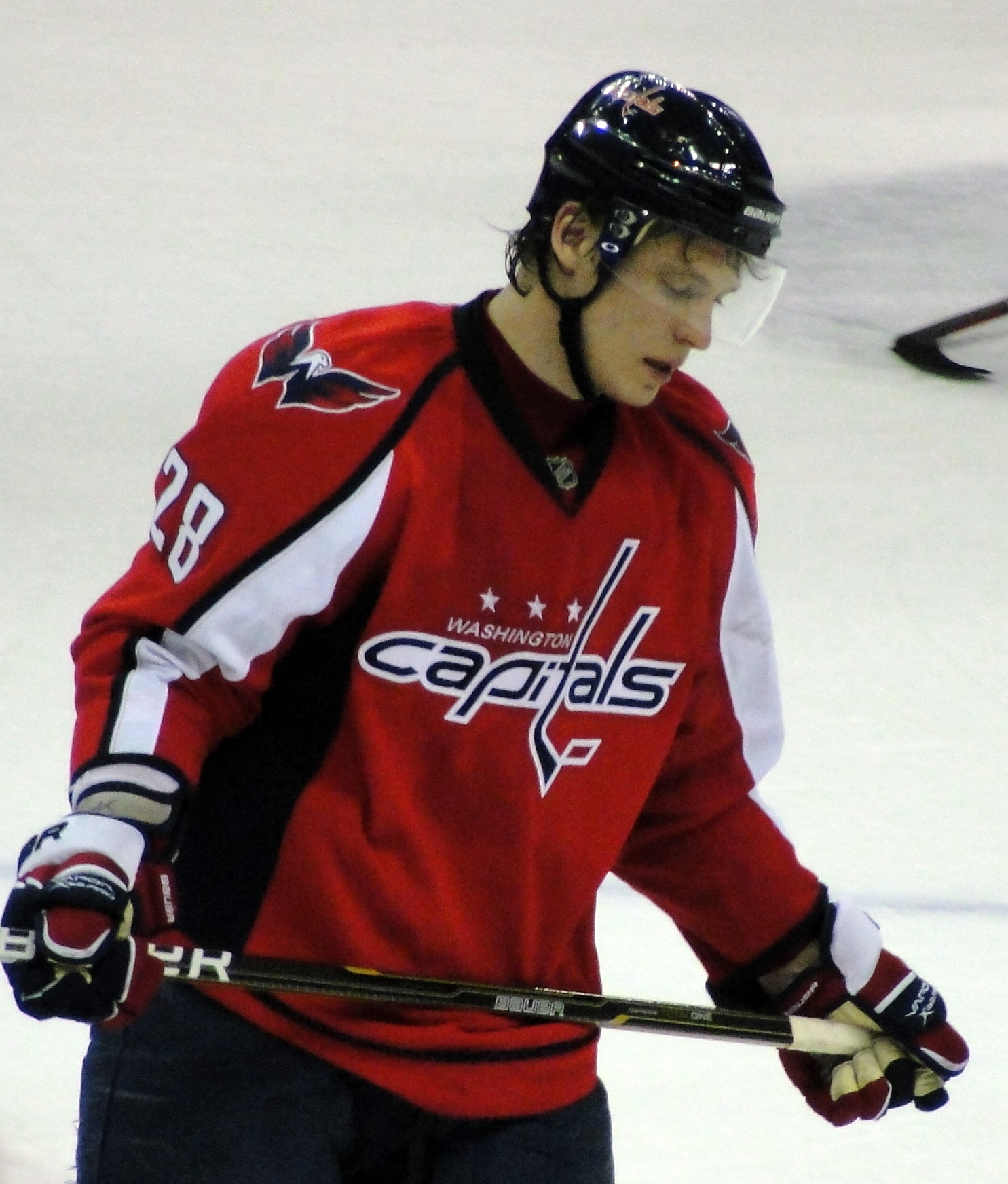
Alexander Semin was the subject of Matt Bradley's comments

During the off-season, the Capitals made several player changes. One of the players that was not retained by the team, Matt Bradley, started a controversy with his comments from a radio interview in Ottawa. In the interview, Bradley said his former team was "a little bit too nonchalant and guys weren't disciplined the way they should have been," which he claimed were the two biggest reasons why the team was not able to advance past the second round of the Stanley Cup playoffs. He later stated that Head Coach Bruce Boudreau did not give the most ice time to players who were playing well, but went with his star players. He further noted that Boudreau was a "great coach" who had been put in a tough position. When asked to point out examples, Bradley stated that Alexander Semin "could easily be the best player in the league," but he "just doesn't care," further noting, "When you've got a guy like that, you need him to be your best player, or one of your best players, and when he doesn't show up, you almost get the sense that he wants to be back in Russia." Semin's agent came to his client's defense, stating he "always cares." Teammate Mike Knuble noted that because Semin speaks limited English, the language barrier affects the way that he is perceived, further noting that the interview comments were something Bradley regretted. When asked about the comments, former Capitals forward Dave Steckel stated that, "It's not like he went out and told lies." Bradley later apologized for his comments in an interview with the Sun Sentinel.

Including Bradley, the Capitals lost six players who played for them in the playoffs, as well as back-up goaltender Semyon Varlamov.^{[note 1]} To replace some of the departed players, Washington traded its 2011 first-round draft pick to the Chicago Blackhawks for veteran winger Troy Brouwer, who was a member of the Blackhawks' Stanley Cup championship team in 2010. They then signed Joel Ward as a free agent, adding grit and the hopes that he could duplicate his 2011 playoff success. Ward scored seven goals and 13 points in 12 playoff games with the Nashville Predators, after scoring 10 goals and 29 points in 80 regular season games. In net, they added veteran Tomas Vokoun, who was considered to be one of the top goaltenders in the 2011 free agent class. He signed a one-year, $1.5 million contract, well below his believed market value, to have a chance at winning the Stanley Cup. After making these and other off-season moves, the Capitals were over the NHL salary cap. The expectation was that defenseman Tom Poti would not be able to play due to injury and Washington would be forced to place him on long-term injured reserve, where his $2.9 million salary would not count against the cap total. Unexpectedly, Poti told the Capitals that he would be ready to play by training camp. Poti, however, failed his medical exam prior to training camp and was placed on long-term injured reserve.

== Regular season ==
=== October – November ===
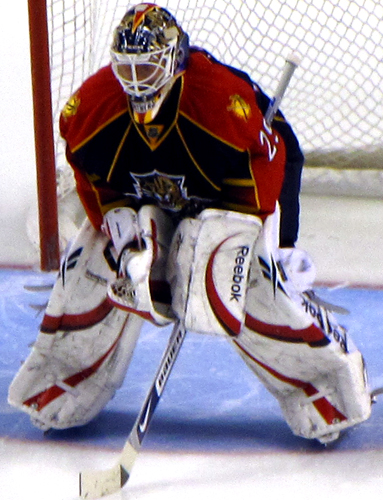
Tomas Vokoun, show here with the Florida Panthers, was named the third star of the week in October.

In the season opener against the Carolina Hurricanes, Boudreau made a "surprise" decision to start goaltender Michal Neuvirth. Boudreau stated that the reason behind his decision was a reward for Neuvirth's hard work in training camp. Prior to the Capitals' second game, Neuvirth sustained a bruised foot and was unable to play. In his Capitals debut, Vokoun struggled, allowing five goals on 28 shots, but nevertheless Washington won the game 6–5 in a shootout. In the post-game interview, Vokoun blamed himself for the high number of goals and thanked his teammates for getting him the win in a game he should have lost. Vokoun rebounded in his second game, making 39 saves in a 3–2 win over the Pittsburgh Penguins. He continued his strong play and was named the NHL's third star of the week ending October 23 and helped the Capitals to a franchise-record seven game winning streak to start a season.

After losing two straight games, Washington was down 4–3 to the Anaheim Ducks in the final minutes of the game. With the goaltender pulled, Boudreau decided to play the third line of Joel Ward, Brooks Laich and Jason Chimera with Nicklas Backstrom as the extra attacker. Boudreau stated that he was "playing a hunch" by leaving star forward Alexander Ovechkin on the bench. The move paid off, however, as Backstrom scored to force overtime. He also scored the game winner in overtime assisted by Ovechkin. When asked about being left on the bench in a post-game interview, Ovechkin stated that Laich's line deserved to be on the ice – though the video showed Ovechkin visibly upset about being left on the bench. The following day, Ovechkin stated that he was upset about not being on the ice in the final minutes, but that he understood Boudreau's decision. The Hockey News' Ken Campbell applauded the benching of Ovechkin stating that in the past Boudreau had shown a willingness to continually put his star players out on the ice despite how they were playing and accepted the consequences. Campbell noted the move was Boudreau "addressing his most glaring problem as a coach".

Following the benching incident, the Capitals went 2–5–0 leading up to their November 21 game against the Phoenix Coyotes.^{[note 2]} For the game, Boudreau again made headlines for not playing one of his star players, this time making Alexander Semin a healthy scratch (a non-dressing player). Semin led the team in penalties-in-minutes (PIMs), as well as being tied for second in the NHL with 14 minor penalties. Boudreau previously benched Semin for the second half of a game against the New Jersey Devils after the winger had taken two minor penalties and was deemed not focused. Washington defeated Phoenix in the game 4–3. NBC's Mike Halford echoed Campbell's statement when discussing the benching of Semin, commenting that it was a "bold move" and the latest in a series of messages sent by Boudreau. Halford further questioned if the new stance would eventually cost Boudreau his job.

The benchings did not produce the desired results, however, as the Capitals lost six of eight games, with Ovechkin scoring only one goal during the same stretch. As a result, Washington fired Boudreau on November 28 and replaced him with former Capitals captain Dale Hunter. Hunter was the head coach of the Ontario Hockey League's (OHL) London Knights when he was hired. During his time with London, he set an OHL record for fastest coach to 300 and 400 career wins. The Capitals lost Hunter's coaching debut 2–1 to the St. Louis Blues. The following day, Boudreau spoke to the media about being fired, stating that general manager George McPhee made the "right decision at the time" and that despite speculation, he did not feel that Ovechkin was a problem, stating that he "worked as hard and tried as hard as he could."

=== December – January ===
The Capitals did not give Hunter his first NHL win until his third game, a 3–2 win over the Ottawa Senators that broke a four-game losing streak. Brooks Laich scored the game-winning goal just 12 seconds into the overtime period. The goal would prove to be the fastest overtime goal scored during the 2011–12 NHL regular season. In the rematch four days later, Ovechkin appeared to spear Senators forward Chris Neil. Following a Neil hit on Ovechkin, the pair skated up the ice, whereupon Neil fell to the ice following the alleged spear. Neil was given an unsportsmanlike conduct penalty for diving. A spearing penalty, if called, would have resulted in a five-minute major penalty and a game misconduct. Later in the game, Ovechkin scored the eventual game-winning goal, his first goal in six games. When asked about the incident after the game, Neil described it as a "pitchfork in the gut," while Ovechkin stated he was "not the type of guy who spears players." The following day, a league spokesman stated that Ovechkin would not be suspended or fined for the incident.

The December 28 game against the New York Rangers marked the return of fourth line forward Jay Beagle, who previously missed 31 games with a concussion suffered in a fight against the Pittsburgh Penguins' Arron Asham. The fight itself had generated a minor controversy, as Asham, an experienced fighter, made celebratory gestures after knocking out Beagle, who was in his first career NHL fight. Several Capitals expressed their displeasure with Asham after the game, while Asham himself later called his actions "classless." Beagle's work ethic in his return was called contagious by teammate Matt Hendricks, and he helped the Capitals to a 4–1 victory.

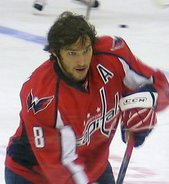
Alexander Ovechkin was suspended and chose not to attend the NHL All-Star Game

In late December, Ovechkin went on a seven-game point streak that featured the two-point games in the final four games of the streak. In conjunction with the point streak, he scored eight goals in nine games.^{[note 3]} Washington went 5–1–1 during the streak, which was eventually snapped in a 5–2 loss to the San Jose Sharks on January 7. In the game prior to the streak being snapped, Capitals' defenseman Mike Green returned from a groin injury that had kept him out of the lineup for 23 games. Washington defeated the Calgary Flames 3–1 in the contest, which moved their record to 9–0–0 with Green in the line-up. However, the news coming out of the game was not all good. During the game, the Capitals' leading scorer, Nicklas Backstrom, was elbowed in the head by the Flames' Rene Bourque. Backstrom underwent concussion testing, which proved inconclusive; he suffered from what was described as "concussion-like symptoms" and was eventually placed on the injured reserve. For his actions, Bourque was suspended five games for delivering the elbow. Compounding the Capitals' injury problem was the loss of Mike Green in just his second game back; he re-injured his groin during the contest and was placed on the long-term injured reserve. During a game against the Pittsburgh Penguins, Ovechkin delivered a hit to Pittsburgh defenseman Zbynek Michalek. On the hit, Ovechkin launched himself into Michalek's shoulder, where the force of the hit caused Ovechkin to make contact with Michalek's head. Later in the game, Michalek delivered an elbow to the back of Matt Hendricks' head, driving it into the glass. The following day, it was announced that Ovechkin was suspended for three games for the reckless hit despite not receiving a penalty on the play during the game. Vice President of Player Safety Brendan Shanahan stated the length of the suspension took into account that Ovechkin was a repeat offender, having been suspended twice before and fined twice as well. It also took into consideration that Michalek was not injured on the play. Despite his own actions, Michalek avoided a fine or suspension. Without Ovechkin, Backstrom or Green, Washington nonetheless defeated defending Stanley Cup champion Boston Bruins in the final game before the All-Star break to move into first place in the Southeast Division.

Washington had two players named to the NHL All-Star Game. Despite having a poor season by his standards, Alexander Ovechkin was named to the Game. However, due to his suspension, Ovechkin announced that he did not want to be a distraction at the game; he was "not comfortable" going, and declined to attend the All-Star weekend. Dennis Wideman was the Capitals' other All-Star representative. He recorded 34 points heading into the break while averaging over 24 minutes of ice time per game.

=== February – April ===
Washington started the second half of the season with a 2–2–1 record. In their next game, against the Winnipeg Jets, the Capitals lost a two-goal lead late in the game, eventually losing in a shootout. The loss knocked the Capitals out of first place in their division and they dropped from third to ninth in the conference. Washington lost their next two games before defeating the Southeast Division-leading Florida Panthers 2–1. The game marked goaltender Tomas Vokoun's first game in Florida after leaving the team as a free agent in the off-season. With the win, Washington moved two points behind the Panthers. Despite being close, however, Washington could not build any momentum, later losing their next three games before closing out the month of February on a three-game win streak.

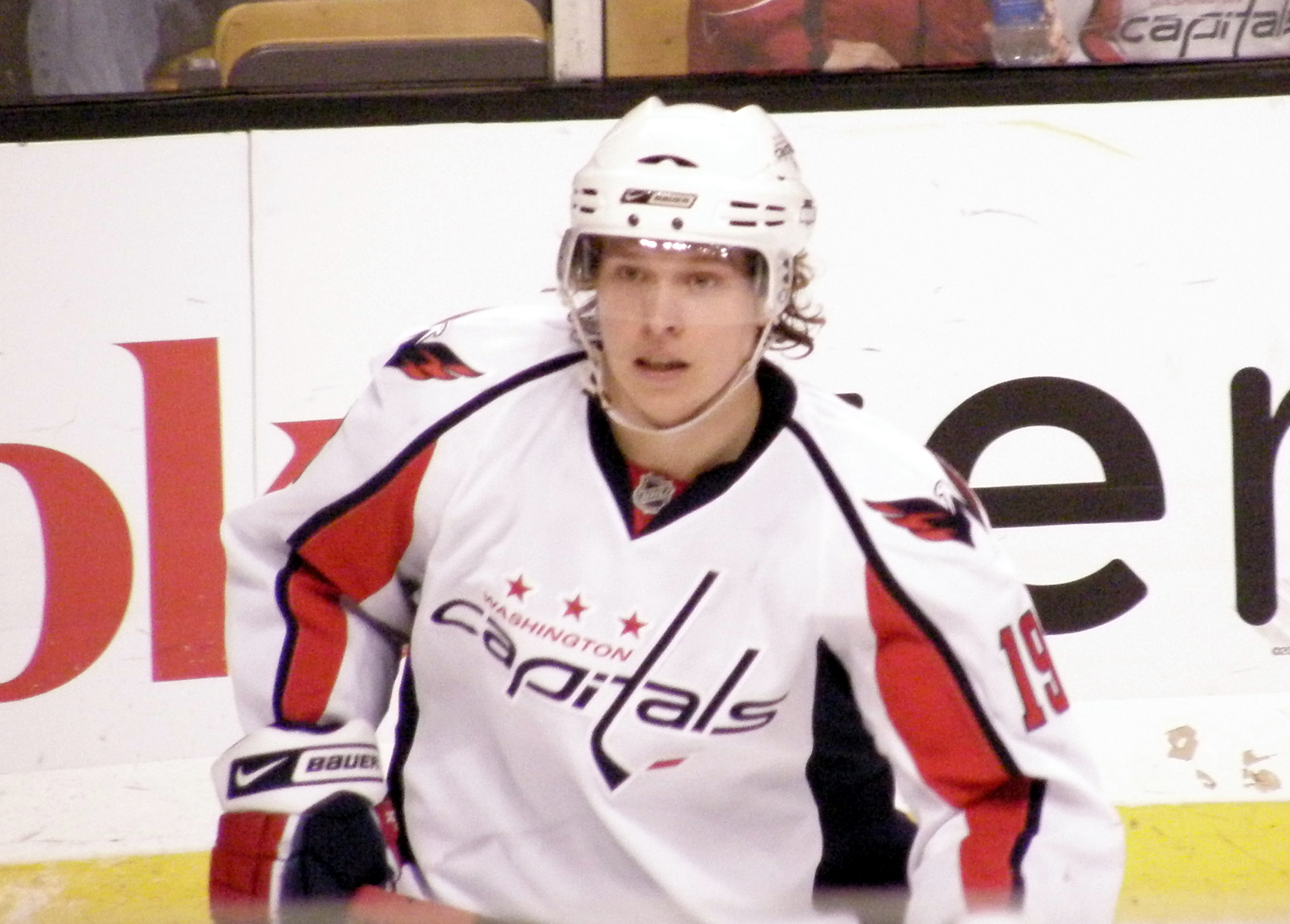
Nicklas Backstrom returned from a concussion late in the season helping the Capitals clinch a playoff spot.

Washington continued its inconsistent play into the month of March, losing three games before going on a four-game winning streak leading up to another game against the Winnipeg Jets. During the loss to the Jets, Vokoun re-aggravated a reoccurring groin injury; he had been dealing with the injury since late February, and it forced him out of the lineup. Braden Holtby was recalled to serve as the team's back-up. During Vokoun's absence, Ovechkin began a goal-scoring streak, notching nine goals in seven games, culminating in a two-goal performance during a 3–0 victory over the Minnesota Wild. The scoring steak helped Ovechkin to be named NHL's third star of the week. The win moved the Capitals into the eighth and final playoff spot. They did not remain there long, however, as their next game was a lost 5–1 to the Buffalo Sabres, who passed Washington for eighth place. The following game, against the Boston Bruins, Vokoun returned to action, but played only 18:25 before the same injury forced him from the game. Although the Capitals won the game, it was Vokoun's final game of the season as well as his last as a Capital, with Vokoun later describing the injury as a "pretty severe [groin] tear." Washington's final game of March marked the return of Nicklas Backstrom, who had missed 40 games with a concussion. The Capitals won the game 3–2 in a shootout, moving them back into eighth place.

Entering April, the Capitals had a chance to clinch a playoff spot against the Tampa Bay Lightning. The game was tied 2–2 with 1:03 remaining when Steven Stamkos scored, leading Tampa to the eventual 4–2 victory. Facing the Division-leading Panthers in their next game, Washington succeeded in clinching a playoff spot with a 4–2 win of their own. The victory also gave the Capitals a chance at winning their Division in their final game. During the game, Neuvirth was hurt when former Capital Marco Sturm fell on top of him while he was making a save. Neuvirth left after the incident and did not return. Neuvirth suffered a lower body injury and was not ready to return for the final game or the start of the playoffs. Washington won its final game of the year behind a 35-save performance from Holtby, clinching at least the seventh seed in the Eastern Conference pending the outcome of Florida's game. A win by the Panthers in their final game, however, prevented Washington from winning their fifth-straight Division title and moving into the third playoff seed.

== Playoffs ==
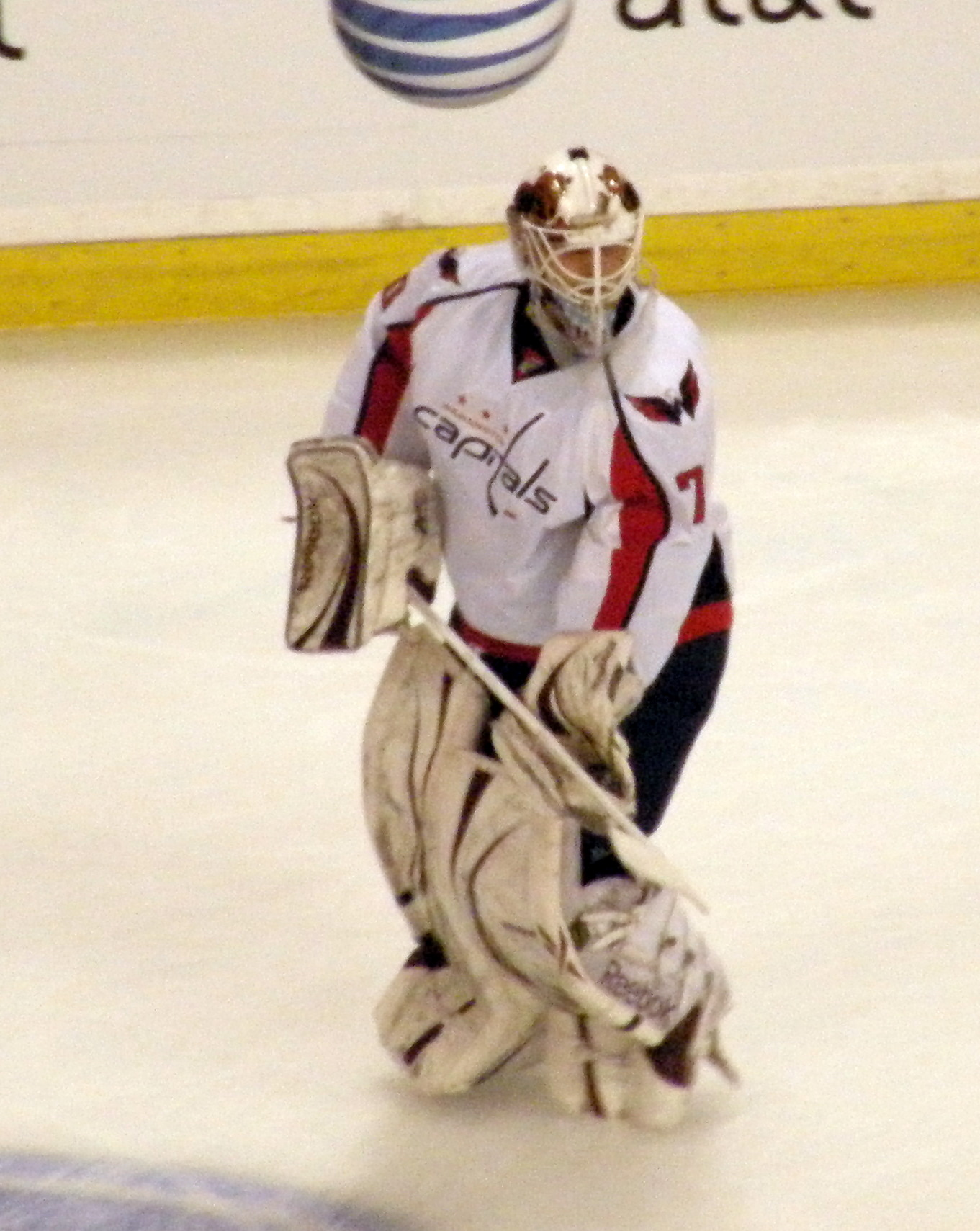
Braden Holtby received praise for his playoff performance.

Finishing the regular season as the seventh seed, Washington was matched up with the defending champion Boston Bruins. As Tomas Vokoun and Michal Neuvirth were still injured, the Capitals were forced to start Braden Holtby in Game 1. Through the first two periods, Boston was in control of the game, out-shooting Washington 26–7. Despite the disparity in shots, the game remained tied 0–0 after regulation. Washington lost the game shortly into overtime. They rebounded to tie the series when Nicklas Backstrom scored in double overtime of game two. Through the first two games of the series, Holtby stopped 72 of 74 Bruins' shots. In Game 3, the two teams again looked to be heading to overtime tied 3–3 late in the third when Backstrom took a penalty. Zdeno Chara scored on the man advantage with under two minutes remaining, giving Boston the win. After the game ended, Backstrom was given a match penalty for intent to injure following a cross-check to Rich Peverley. Backstrom received a one-game suspension for his actions. Without Backstrom in Game 4, the Capitals evened the series with a 2–1 victory that featured a 44-save performance from Holtby. The Capitals took their first lead in the series thanks to a Troy Brouwer power-play goal with 1:27 left in regulation of game five. Facing elimination, Boston did not trail throughout Game 6 and was in position to win late in the third. However, an Alexander Ovechkin goal led to overtime, where Tyler Seguin scored to force a seventh and deciding game. Game 7 went to overtime, where a dump-in attempt was blocked by Mike Knuble, giving him a breakaway. He took a backhand that was stopped by Boston's Tim Thomas. Joel Ward followed the play and scored the game-winning goal on the rebound. With Washington's victory in the series, Holtby became just the third rookie goaltender in NHL history to defeat the reigning Stanley Cup champions. It was also the first playoff series in NHL history which all seven games were decided by one goal.

In the second round, Washington was matched up with the top-seeded New York Rangers. After losing Game 1 by giving up two goals in a 1:30 span, Washington took a 2–0 lead in Game 2, only to have the Rangers come back and tie the score in the third period. The Capitals, however, won the game on an Ovechkin power-play goal late in the third. Game 3 was a triple-overtime contest that ended when Marian Gaborik scored to give New York a 2–1 win. The 114:41 game was the 20th longest game in NHL history, and Washington's third-longest game in franchise history. Washington evened the series in Game 4 with a one-goal win. In the win, Ovechkin was benched for the majority of the third period, where after the tilt, he noted that the most important thing was that the Capitals won the game. Washington looked to be heading for their first series lead as Game 5 was coming to an end. The Capitals were leading 2–1 with 21.3 seconds remaining when Joel Ward took a double minor penalty for high-sticking. On the ensuing power play, Brad Richards scored with 6.6 seconds left in regulation to tie the game. The Rangers remained on the power play to start the overtime period, with Ward serving the second half of his double minor when Marc Staal scored to give New York the win. Facing elimination in Game 6, Washington took the lead 1:28 into the game on an Ovechkin power play tally. They did not trail in the game and won 2–1 to force Game 7. Ovechkin's goal was the 30th of his post-season career, which tied him for the Capitals all-time franchise record with Peter Bondra. In the deciding game, Brad Richards scored 1:32 into the first period helping New York to the eventual 2–1 victory and the series win. Holtby finished the playoffs with a 1.95 goals against average, a .935 save percentage and was praised for his "breakout" performance while being credited with giving the Capitals a "chance to win every game."

== Post-season ==
Two days after the loss, Head Coach Dale Hunter stepped down for personal reasons. General Manager George McPhee announced that he would take his time considering candidates to replace Hunter. The search lasted a month and a half before the team hired former NHL and Capitals star, Adam Oates. The intention was to have a coach that combined the up-tempo style implored by Bruce Boudreau and the "defense first" system of Hunter. McPhee said of the hiring "you try to get the smartest guy in the room" and he believed Oates was that person. Ovechkin noted that he was excited to play under a coach he believed would bring more offense back to Washington's system. Oates' hiring came on the same day that he was elected to the Hockey Hall of Fame as a player.

== Standings ==
=== Divisional standings ===
Southeast Division
Pos	Team	GP	W	L	OTL	ROW	GF	GA	GD	Pts
1	y – Florida Panthers	82	38	26	18	32	203	227	−24	94
2	x – Washington Capitals	82	42	32	8	38	222	230	−8	92
3	Tampa Bay Lightning	82	38	36	8	35	235	281	−46	84
4	Winnipeg Jets	82	37	35	10	33	225	246	−21	84
5	Carolina Hurricanes	82	33	33	16	32	213	243	−30	82

Source: National Hockey League
x – Clinched playoff spot; y – Clinched division

=== Conference standings ===
Eastern Conference
R		Div	GP	W	L	OTL	ROW	GF	GA	Pts
1	z – New York Rangers	AT	82	51	24	7	47	226	187	109
2	y – Boston Bruins	NE	82	49	29	4	40	269	202	102
3	y – Florida Panthers	SE	82	38	26	18	32	203	227	94
4	x – Pittsburgh Penguins	AT	82	51	25	6	42	282	221	108
5	x – Philadelphia Flyers	AT	82	47	26	9	43	264	232	103
6	x – New Jersey Devils	AT	82	48	28	6	36	228	209	102
7	x – Washington Capitals	SE	82	42	32	8	38	222	230	92
8	x – Ottawa Senators	NE	82	41	31	10	35	249	240	92
8.5
9	Buffalo Sabres	NE	82	39	32	11	32	218	230	89
10	Tampa Bay Lightning	SE	82	38	36	8	35	235	281	84
11	Winnipeg Jets	SE	82	37	35	10	33	225	246	84
12	Carolina Hurricanes	SE	82	33	33	16	32	213	243	82
13	Toronto Maple Leafs	NE	82	35	37	10	31	231	264	80
14	New York Islanders	AT	82	34	37	11	27	203	255	79
15	Montreal Canadiens	NE	82	31	35	16	26	212	226	78

Divisions: AT – Atlantic, NE – Northeast, SE – Southeast

x – Qualified for playoffs, y – Clinched division, z – Clinched conference (and division)

== Schedule and results ==
=== Pre-season ===
2011 Pre-season: 3–3–1 (Home: 3–1–0; Road: 0–2–1)
#	Date	Visitor	Score	Home	OT	Decision	Record	Attendance	Recap
1	September 20 (in Baltimore, MD)	Nashville Predators	2–0	Washington Capitals	-	Neuvirth	0–1–0	11,082	Recap
2	September 21	Washington Capitals	3–4	Columbus Blue Jackets	OT	Grubauer	0–1–1	8,264	Recap
3	September 23	Washington Capitals	2–3	Chicago Blackhawks	-	Vokoun	0–2–1	19,798	Recap
4	September 26	Columbus Blue Jackets	1–3	Washington Capitals	-	Neuvirth	1–2–1	18,025	Recap
5	September 28	Washington Capitals	1–4	Nashville Predators	-	Vokoun	1–3–1	13,437	Recap
6	September 30	Buffalo Sabres	3–4	Washington Capitals	SO	Vokoun	2–3–1	18, 356	Recap
7	October 2	Chicago Blackhawks	1–4	Washington Capitals	-	Neuvirth	3–3–1	18, 405	Recap

=== Regular season ===
October: 7–2–0 (Home: 5–0–0; Road: 2–2–0)
#	Date	Visitor	Score	Home	OT	Decision	Record	Points	Attendance	Recap
1	8	Carolina Hurricanes	3–4	Washington Capitals	OT	Neuvirth	1–0–0	2	18, 506	Recap
2	10	Tampa Bay Lightning	5–6	Washington Capitals	SO	Vokoun	2–0–0	4	18,506	Recap
3	13	Washington Capitals	3–2	Pittsburgh Penguins	OT	Vokoun	3–0–0	6	18,512	Recap
4	15	Ottawa Senators	1–2	Washington Capitals		Vokoun	4–0–0	8	18,506	Recap
5	18	Florida Panthers	0–3	Washington Capitals		Vokoun	5–0–0	10	18,506	Recap
6	20	Washington Capitals	5–2	Philadelphia Flyers		Vokoun	6–0–0	12	19,658	Recap
7	22	Detroit Red Wings	1–7	Washington Capitals		Vokoun	7–0–0	14	18,506	Recap
8	27	Washington Capitals	1–2	Edmonton Oilers		Vokoun	7–1–0	14	16,839	Recap
9	29	Washington Capitals	4–7	Vancouver Canucks		Neuvirth	7–2–0	14	18,860	Recap

November: 5–8–1 (Home: 3–3–1; Road: 2–5–0)
#	Date	Visitor	Score	Home	OT	Decision	Record	Points	Attendance	Recap
10	1	Anaheim Ducks	4–5	Washington Capitals	OT	Vokoun	8–2–0	16	18,506	Recap
11	4	Washington Capitals	5–1	Carolina Hurricanes		Neuvirth	9–2–0	18	14,589	Recap
12	5	Washington Capitals	3–5	New York Islanders		Vokoun	9–3–0	18	14,812	Recap
13	8	Dallas Stars	5–2	Washington Capitals		Neuvirth	9–4–0	18	18,506	Recap
14	11	Washington Capitals	3–1	New Jersey Devils		Vokoun	10–4–0	20	15,230
15	12	New Jersey Devils	3–2	Washington Capitals	SO	Neuvirth	10–4–1	21	18,506
16	15	Washington Capitals	1–3	Nashville Predators		Vokoun	10–5–1	21	14,863
17	17	Washington Capitals	1–4	Winnipeg Jets		Neuvirth	10–6–1	21	15,004	Recap
18	19	Washington Capitals	1–7	Toronto Maple Leafs		Vokoun	10–7–1	21	19,594	Recap
19	21	Phoenix Coyotes	3–4	Washington Capitals		Vokoun	11–7–1	23	18,506	Recap
20	23	Winnipeg Jets	3–4	Washington Capitals		Vokoun	12–7–1	25	18,506	Recap
21	25	New York Rangers	6–3	Washington Capitals		Neuvirth	12–8–1	25	18,506	Recap
22	26	Washington Capitals	1–5	Buffalo Sabres		Vokoun	12–9–1	25	18,690	Recap
23	29	St. Louis Blues	2–1	Washington Capitals		Vokoun	12–10–1	25	18,506	Recap

December: 8–5–1 (Home: 5–2–0; Road: 3–3–1)
#	Date	Visitor	Score	Home	OT	Decision	Record	Points	Attendance	Recap
24	1	Pittsburgh Penguins	2–1	Washington Capitals		Vokoun	12–11–1	25	18,506	Recap
25	3	Ottawa Senators	2–3	Washington Capitals	OT	Neuvirth	13–11–1	27	18,506	Recap
26	5	Washington Capitals	4–5	Florida Panthers		Neuvirth	13–12–1	27	16,337	Recap
27	7	Washington Capitals	5–3	Ottawa Senators		Vokoun	14–12–1	29	17,771	Recap
28	9	Toronto Maple Leafs	2–4	Washington Capitals		Vokoun	15–12–1	31	18,506	Recap
29	13	Philadelphia Flyers	5–1	Washington Capitals		Vokoun	15–13–1	31	18,506	Recap
30	15	Washington Capitals	1–0	Winnipeg Jets		Neuvirth	16–13–1	33	15,004	Recap
31	17	Washington Capitals	1–2	Colorado Avalanche		Neuvirth	16–14–1	33	16,011	Recap
32	20	Nashville Predators	1–4	Washington Capitals		Neuvirth	17–14–1	35	18,506	Recap
33	23	Washington Capitals	3–4	New Jersey Devils	SO	Neuvirth	17–14–2	36	14,043	Recap
34	26	Washington Capitals	2–4	Buffalo Sabres		Neuvirth	17–15–2	36	18,690	Recap
35	28	New York Rangers	1–4	Washington Capitals		Vokoun	18–15–2	38	18,506	Recap
36	30	Buffalo Sabres	1–3	Washington Capitals		Vokoun	19–15–2	40	18,506	Recap
37	31	Washington Capitals	4–2	Columbus Blue Jackets		Vokoun	20–15–2	42	18,199	Recap

January: 6–4–2 (Home: 5–1–0; Road: 1–3–2)
#	Date	Visitor	Score	Home	OT	Decision	Record	Points	Attendance	Recap
38	3	Calgary Flames	1–3	Washington Capitals		Vokoun	21–15–2	44	18,506	Recap
39	7	Washington Capitals	2–5	San Jose Sharks		Vokoun	21–16–2	44	17,562	Recap
40	9	Washington Capitals	2–5	Los Angeles Kings		Vokoun	21–17–2	44	18,118	Recap
41	11	Pittsburgh Penguins	0–1	Washington Capitals		Vokoun	22–17–2	46	18,506	Recap
42	13	Tampa Bay Lightning	3–4	Washington Capitals		Vokoun	23–17–2	48	18,506	Recap
43	15	Carolina Hurricanes	1–2	Washington Capitals		Vokoun	24–17–2	50	18,506	Recap
44	17	New York Islanders	3–0	Washington Capitals		Vokoun	24–18–2	50	18,506	Recap
45	18	Washington Capitals	3–0	Montreal Canadiens		Neuvirth	25–18–2	52	21,273	Recap
46	20	Washington Capitals	0–3	Carolina Hurricanes		Vokoun	25–19–2	52	17,507	Recap
47	22	Washington Capitals	3–4	Pittsburgh Penguins	OT	Neuvirth	25–19–3	53	18,565	Recap
48	24	Boston Bruins	3–5	Washington Capitals		Vokoun	26–19–3	55	18,506	Recap
49	31	Washington Capitals	3–4	Tampa Bay Lightning	OT	Vokoun	26–19–4	56	17,754	Recap

February: 6–7–1 (Home: 3–2–1; Road: 3–5–0)
#	Date	Visitor	Score	Home	OT	Decision	Record	Points	Attendance	Recap
50	1	Washington Capitals	2–4	Florida Panthers		Neuvirth	26–20–4	56	15,231	Recap
51	4	Washington Capitals	3–0	Montreal Canadiens		Vokoun	27–20–4	58	21,273	Recap
52	5	Boston Bruins	4–1	Washington Capitals		Vokoun	27–21–4	58	18,506	Recap
53	7	Florida Panthers	0–4	Washington Capitals		Vokoun	28–21–4	60	18,506	Recap
54	9	Winnipeg Jets	3–2	Washington Capitals	SO	Vokoun	28–21–5	61	18,506	Recap
55	12	Washington Capitals	2–3	New York Rangers		Neuvirth	28–22–5	61	18,200	Recap
56	13	San Jose Sharks	5–3	Washington Capitals		Holtby	28–23–5	61	18,506	Recap
57	17	Washington Capitals	2–1	Florida Panthers		Vokoun	29–23–5	63	17,779	Recap
58	18	Washington Capitals	1–2	Tampa Bay Lightning		Vokoun	29–24–5	63	19,204	Recap
59	20	Washington Capitals	0–5	Carolina Hurricanes		Vokoun	29–25–5	63	16,837	Recap
60	22	Washington Capitals	2–5	Ottawa Senators		Vokoun	29–26–5	63	18,357	Recap
61	24	Montreal Canadiens	1–4	Washington Capitals		Neuvirth	30–26–5	65	18,506	Recap
62	25	Washington Capitals	4–2	Toronto Maple Leafs		Neuvirth	31–26–5	67	19,577	Recap
63	28	New York Islanders	2–3	Washington Capitals	OT	Neuvirth	32–26–5	69	18,506	Recap

March: 8–5–3 (Home: 4–3–2; Road: 4–2–1)
#	Date	Visitor	Score	Home	OT	Decision	Record	Points	Attendance	Recap
64	2	New Jersey Devils	5–0	Washington Capitals		Neuvirth	32–27–5	69	185,06	Recap
65	4	Philadelphia Flyers	1–0	Washington Capitals		Neuvirth	32–28–5	69	18,506	Recap
66	6	Carolina Hurricanes	4–3	Washington Capitals	OT	Neuvirth	32–28–6	70	18,506	Recap
67	8	Tampa Bay Lightning	2–3	Washington Capitals	OT	Vokoun	33–28–6	72	18,506	Recap
68	10	Washington Capitals	4–3	Boston Bruins		Vokoun	34–26–6	74	17,565	Recap
69	11	Toronto Maple Leafs	0–2	Washington Capitals		Neuvirth	35–26–6	76	18,506	Recap
70	13	Washington Capitals	5–4	New York Islanders	SO	Neuvirth	36–26–6	78	11,488	Recap
71	16	Washington Capitals	2–3	Winnipeg Jets		Vokoun	36–27–6	78	15,004	Recap
72	18	Washington Capitals	2–5	Chicago Blackhawks		Neuvirth	36–28–6	78	21,561	Recap
73	19	Washington Capitals	5–3	Detroit Red Wings		Holtby	37–28–6	80	20,066	Recap
74	22	Washington Capitals	1–2	Philadelphia Flyers	SO	Holtby	37–29–7	81	19,948	Recap
75	23	Winnipeg Jets	4–3	Washington Capitals	OT	Neuvirth	37–29–8	82	18,506	Recap
76	25	Minnesota Wild	0–3	Washington Capitals		Holtby	38–30–8	84	18,506	Recap
77	27	Buffalo Sabres	5–1	Washington Capitals		Holtby	38–31–8	84	18,506	Recap
78	29	Washington Capitals	3–2	Boston Bruins	SO	Neuvirth	39–31–8	86	17,565	Recap
79	31	Montreal Canadiens	2–3	Washington Capitals	SO	Neuvirth	40–31–8	88	18,506	Recap

April: 2–1–0 (Home: 1–0–0; Road: 1–1–0)
#	Date	Visitor	Score	Home	OT	Decision	Record	Points	Attendance	Recap
80	2	Washington Capitals	2–4	Tampa Bay Lightning		Neuvirth	40–32–8	88	19,204	Recap
81	5	Florida Panthers	2–4	Washington Capitals		Holtby	41–32–8	90	18,506	Recap
82	7	Washington Capitals	4–1	New York Rangers		Holtby	42–32–8	92	18,200	Recap

=== Playoffs ===
Key: Win Loss Clinch Playoff Series Eliminated from playoffs

2012 Stanley Cup Playoffs

Eastern Conference Quarter-finals: vs. (2) Boston Bruins – Capitals win series 4–3
#	Date	Visitor	Score	Home	OT	Decision	Attendance	Series	Recap
1	April 12	Washington Capitals	0–1	Boston Bruins	OT	Holtby	17,565	0–1	Recap
2	April 14	Washington Capitals	2–1	Boston Bruins	2OT	Holtby	17,565	1–1	Recap
3	April 16	Boston Bruins	4–3	Washington Capitals		Holtby	18,506	1–2	Recap
4	April 19	Boston Bruins	1–2	Washington Capitals		Holtby	18,506	2–2	Recap
5	April 21	Washington Capitals	4–3	Boston Bruins		Holtby	17,565	3–2	Recap
6	April 22	Boston Bruins	4–3	Washington Capitals	OT	Holtby	18,506	3–3	Recap
7	April 25	Washington Capitals	2–1	Boston Bruins	OT	Holtby	17,565	4–3	Recap

Eastern Conference Semi-finals: vs. (1) New York Rangers – Rangers win series 4–3
#	Date	Visitor	Score	Home	OT	Decision	Attendance	Series	Recap
1	April 28	Washington Capitals	1–3	New York Rangers		Holtby	18,200	0–1	Recap
2	April 30	Washington Capitals	3–2	New York Rangers		Holtby	18,200	1–1	Recap
3	May 2	New York Rangers	2–1	Washington Capitals	3OT	Holtby	18,506	1–2	Recap
4	May 5	New York Rangers	2–3	Washington Capitals		Holtby	18,506	2–2	Recap
5	May 7	Washington Capitals	2–3	New York Rangers	OT	Holtby	18,200	2–3	Recap
6	May 9	New York Rangers	1–2	Washington Capitals		Holtby	18,506	3–3	Recap
7	May 12	Washington Capitals	1–2	New York Rangers		Holtby	18,200	3–4	Recap

== Player statistics ==
=== Skaters ===
Note: GP = Games played; G = Goals; A = Assists; Pts = Points; +/− = Plus/minus; PIM = Penalty minutes

Regular season

Player	GP	G	A	Pts	+/−	PIM
Alexander Ovechkin	78	38	27	65	−8	26
Alexander Semin	77	21	33	54	9	56
Marcus Johansson	80	14	32	46	−5	8
Dennis Wideman	82	11	35	46	−8	46
Nicklas Backstrom	42	14	30	44	−4	24
Brooks Laich	82	16	25	41	−8	34
Jason Chimera	82	20	19	39	4	78
Troy Brouwer	82	18	15	33	−15	61
John Carlson	82	9	23	32	−15	22
Mathieu Perreault	64	16	14	30	9	24
Dmitry Orlov	60	3	16	19	1	18
Mike Knuble	72	6	12	18	−15	32
Joel Ward	73	6	12	18	12	20
Karl Alzner	82	1	16	17	12	29
Jeff Halpern	69	4	12	16	−1	24
Roman Hamrlik	68	2	11	13	11	34
Keith Aucoin	27	3	8	11	4	0
Matt Hendricks	78	4	5	9	−6	95
Cody Eakin	30	4	4	8	2	4
Mike Green	32	3	4	7	5	12
Jeff Schultz	54	1	5	6	−2	12
Jay Beagle	41	4	1	5	−2	23
John Erskine	28	0	2	2	3	51
Sean Collins	2	0	0	0	−1	0
D. J. King	1	0	0	0	0	0
Tomas Kundratek	5	0	0	0	0	2
Joel Rechlicz	3	0	0	0	0	10

Playoffs

Player	GP	G	A	Pts	+/−	PIM
Alexander Ovechkin	14	5	4	9	−2	8
Nicklas Backstrom	13	2	6	8	2	18
Jason Chimera	14	4	3	7	5	6
Brooks Laich	14	2	5	7	1	6
Joel Ward	14	1	4	5	3	6
John Carlson	14	2	3	5	−1	8
Roman Hamrlik	14	1	3	4	8	12
Alexander Semin	14	3	1	4	−4	10
Mike Green	14	2	2	4	5	10
Troy Brouwer	14	2	2	4	−2	8
Mike Knuble	11	2	1	3	3	6
Dennis Wideman	14	0	3	3	−7	2
Marcus Johansson	14	1	2	3	−6	0
Matt Hendricks	14	1	1	2	−1	6
Keith Aucoin	14	0	2	2	−2	2
Karl Alzner	14	0	2	2	−1	0
Jay Beagle	12	1	1	2	1	4
John Erskine	4	0	1	1	−1	0
Jeff Halpern	2	0	0	0	−1	4
Jeff Schultz	10	0	0	0	−7	2
Mathieu Perreault	4	0	0	0	−1	0

=== Goaltenders ===
Note: GP = Games played; Min = Time on ice (minutes); W = Wins; L = Losses; OT = Overtime losses; GA = Goals against; GAA= Goals against average; SA= Shots against; SV= Saves; Sv% = Save percentage; SO= Shutouts

Regular season

Player	GP	Min	W	L	OT	GA	GAA	SA	Sv%	SO	G	A	PIM
Tomas Vokoun	48	2583	25	17	2	108	2.51	1299	.917	4	0	2	4
Michal Neuvirth	38	2020	13	13	5	95	2.82	976	.903	3	0	1	2
Braden Holtby	7	361	4	2	1	15	2.49	15	.922	1	0	0	0

Playoffs

Player	GP	Min	W	L	GA	GAA	SA	Sv%	SO	G	A	PIM
Braden Holtby	14	922	7	7	30	1.95	459	.935	0	0	0	2

== Awards and records ==
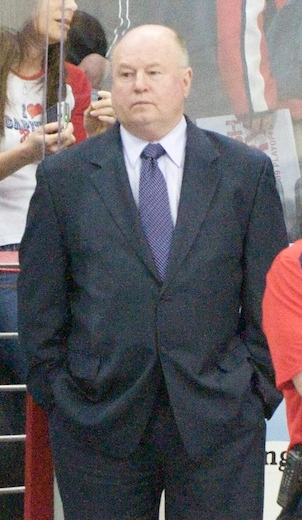
Bruce Boudreau became the fastest coach to 200 wins in NHL history during the season.

Entering the season, Boudreau had amassed 189 wins in 309 NHL games. The win total put him on track to surpass Don Cherry as the fastest head coach to reach 200 NHL victories. After reaching 199 wins, Washington went on a four-game losing streak before finally earning Boudreau the milestone win. Despite the losing streak, Boudreau registered his 200th win in 326 games, eclipsing Cherry's previous mark of 341 games. While Boudreau set the record, he had the advantage of overtime and shootout victories, which did not exist during Cherry's coaching career. Boudreau was fired seven days after setting the record.

Besides Ovechkin's March and Vokoun's third star award, Washington had players named NHL weekly stars three other times. Backstrom was named a third star after recording four points in two games. John Carlson earned third star honors with back-to-back three-point games and finishing the week with seven points. Ovechkin received the first of his two star awards by scoring eight points in six games in January.

=== Awards ===
Regular Season
Player	Award	Awarded
Tomas Vokoun	NHL Third Star of the Week	October 24, 2011
Nicklas Backstrom	NHL Third Star of the Week	November 7, 2011
John Carlson	NHL Third Star of the Week	December 12, 2011
Alexander Ovechkin	NHL Second Star of the Week	January 2, 2012
Alexander Ovechkin	NHL Third Star of the Week	March 26, 2012

=== Record ===
Regular Season
name	Record	Date
Bruce Boudreau	Reached 200 wins faster than any coach in NHL history	November 21, 2011

=== Milestones ===
Player	Milestone	Reached
Joel Ward	100th Career NHL Point	October 8, 2011
Jason Chimera	100th Career NHL Goal	October 10, 2011
Jeff Halpern	800th Career NHL Game	October 27, 2011
Alexander Semin	400th Career NHL Game	October 27, 2011
Cody Eakin	1st Career NHL Game	November 1, 2011
Cody Eakin	1st Career NHL Goal; 1st Career NHL Assist; 1st Career NHL Point	November 4, 2011
John Erskine	400th Career NHL Game	November 8, 2011
Jason Chimera	600th Career NHL Game	November 21, 2011
Dmitry Orlov	1st Career NHL Game	November 21, 2011
Dmitry Orlov	1st Career NHL Assist; 1st Career NHL Point	November 23, 2011
Brooks Laich	500th Career NHL Game	December 3, 2011
Alexander Ovechkin	500th Career NHL Game	December 3, 2011
Marcus Johansson	100th Career NHL Game	December 20, 2011
Mike Knuble	1,000th Career NHL Game	December 20, 2011
Nicklas Backstrom	100th Career NHL Goal	December 30, 2011
Tomas Kundratek	1st Career NHL Game	January 11, 2012
Dmitry Orlov	1st Career NHL Goal	January 15, 2012
Dennis Wideman	500th Career NHL Game	January 22, 2012
Alexander Semin	200th Career NHL Assist	February 22, 2012
Joel Ward	300th Career NHL Game	February 22, 2012
Troy Brouwer	300th Career NHL Game	February 25, 2012
Mathieu Perreault	100th Career NHL Game	February 25, 2012
Karl Alzner	200th Career NHL Game	March 8, 2012
Matt Hendricks	200th Career NHL Game	March 8, 2012
Michal Neuvirth	100th Career NHL Game	March 11, 2012
Alexander Semin	400th Career NHL Point	March 19, 2012

== Transactions ==
Going into the off-season, there was concern over the future of goaltender Semyon Varlamov. Washington had given the restricted free agent a qualifying offer, giving the Capitals the right to match any other NHL offers or receive draft pick compensation if they did not match. Though Washington had control of his negotiating rights, Varlamov indicated that he would leave the NHL to play in the Kontinental Hockey League (KHL). He stated that while he wanted to play in the NHL, he did not want to be a back-up. If Varlamov left the League, Washington would not receive any compensation but would retain his NHL rights. In the KHL, a war for Varlamov's services was developing. Lokomotiv Yaroslav claimed to retain Varlamov's KHL rights and wanted to sign him to a contract around $2 million a season. Alternatively, SKA Saint Petersburg filed a complaint with the KHL, stating his rights were not owned because his original contract with Yaroslav predated the formation of the KHL and was therefore invalid. Before the situation could be resolved, the Capitals traded Varlamov's rights to the Colorado Avalanche for a first round pick in the 2012 NHL entry draft, along with a conditional second-round selection 2012 or 2013. Following the trade, team owner Ted Leonsis noted that Varlamov "wanted assurances that we couldn't make to him." He was disappointed, but wished Varlamov well with Colorado. The Avalanche then signed the goaltender to a three-year, $8.5 million contract, thus keeping him in the NHL.

=== Trades ===
Date	Details
June 2, 2011	To Nashville Predators Conditional 7th-round pick in 2013 (Note: Condition not satisfied.)	To Washington Capitals Taylor Stefishen
June 24, 2011	To Chicago Blackhawks 1st-round pick in 2011	To Washington Capitals Troy Brouwer
July 1, 2011	To Colorado Avalanche Semyon Varlamov	To Washington Capitals 1st-round pick in 2012; Conditional 2nd-round pick in 2012 or 2013 (Note: Washington Capitals elected to receive 2nd-round pick in 2012.)
July 8, 2011	To Winnipeg Jets Eric Fehr	To Washington Capitals Danick Paquette; 4th-round pick in 2012
November 8, 2011	To New York Rangers Francois Bouchard	To Washington Capitals Tomas Kundratek
February 2, 2012	To Philadelphia Flyers Matthew Ford	To Washington Capitals Kevin Marshall
February 2, 2012	To Colorado Avalanche Danny Richmond	To Washington Capitals Mike Carman
May 26, 2012	To Boston Bruins Chris Bourque	To Washington Capitals Zach Hamill
June 4, 2012	To Pittsburgh Penguins: Tomas Vokoun	To Washington Capitals: 7th-round pick in 2012

=== Free agents signed ===
Player	Former team	Contract terms
Mattias Sjogren	Farjestad BK	2 years, $1.8 million entry-level contract
Jeff Halpern	Montreal Canadiens	1 year, $875,000
Joel Ward	Nashville Predators	4 years, $12 million
Roman Hamrlik	Montreal Canadiens	2 years, $7 million
Ryan Potulny	Ottawa Senators	2 years, $1.05 million
Matthew Ford	Lake Erie Monsters	1 year, $525,000
Chris Bourque	HC Lugano	1 year, $525,000
Tomas Vokoun	Florida Panthers	1 year, $1.5 million
Danny Richmond	Toronto Marlies	1 year, $525,000
Christian Hanson	Toronto Maple Leafs	1 year, $525,000
Jacob Micflikier	Charlotte Checkers	1 year, $525,000
Joel Rechlicz	Hershey Bears	1 year, $525,000
Cameron Schilling	Miami University	2 years, $1.85 million entry-level contract

=== Free agents lost ===
Player	New team	Contract terms
Marco Sturm	Vancouver Canucks	1 year, $2.25 million
Boyd Gordon	Phoenix Coyotes	2 years, $2.65 million
Matt Bradley	Florida Panthers	2 years, $1.9 million
Andrew Gordon	Anaheim Ducks	2 years, $1.075 million
Steve Pinizzotto	Vancouver Canucks	1 year, $600,000
Jason Arnott	St. Louis Blues	1 year, $2.875 million
Brian Willsie	Montreal Canadiens	1 year, $600,000
Tyler Sloan	Nashville Predators	1 year, $650,000
Scott Hannan	Calgary Flames	1 year, $1 million

=== Player signings ===
Player	Date	Contract terms
Zach Miskovic	May 18, 2011	1 year, $525,000
Patrick McNeill	June 15, 2011	2 years, $1.05 million
Dany Sabourin	June 17, 2011	1 year, $525,000
Brooks Laich	June 28, 2011	6 years, $27 million
Sean Collins	July 1, 2011	1 year, $525,000
Troy Brouwer	July 6, 2011	2 years, $4.7 million
Mathieu Perreault	July 13, 2011	1 year, $525,000
Karl Alzner	July 15, 2011	2 years, $2.57 million
Francois Bouchard	July 15, 2011	1 year, $770,000
Stanislav Galiev	August 24, 2011	3 years, $1.855 million entry-level contract
Jason Chimera	September 29, 2011	2 years, $3.5 million contract extension

== 2011 draft picks ==
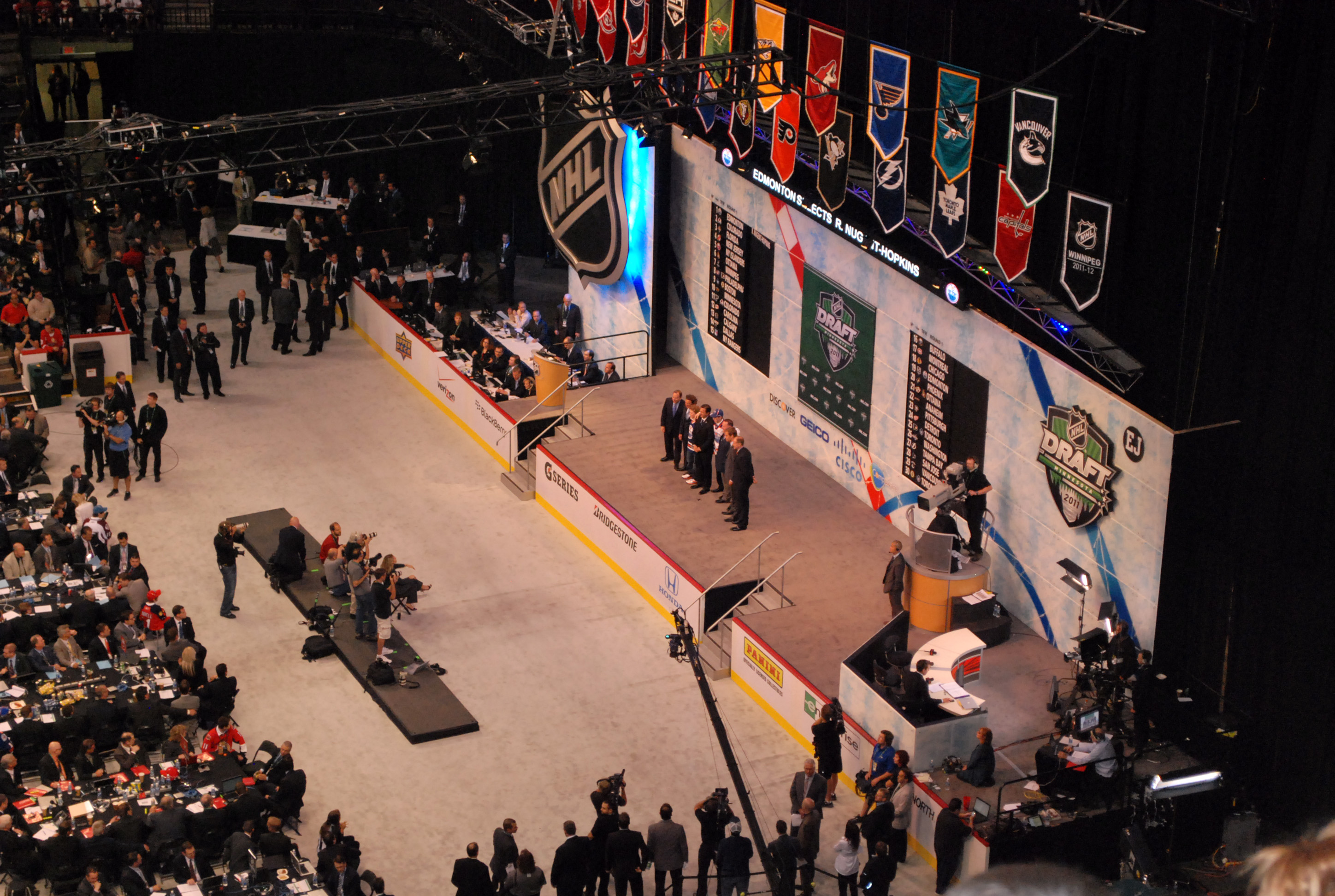
The stage at the 2011 NHL entry draft

The 2011 NHL entry draft was held in Saint Paul, Minnesota, on June 24 and 25. Heading into the draft, the Capitals had only five picks due to a variety of trades, which was tied for the fewest in franchise history. Believing that they had prospect depth in their organization and not seeing an available player who could help immediately, Washington traded their first round pick for Troy Brouwer. With just late round selections remaining, the Capitals decided to take players that required time to develop. Three of their four picks were in, or set to attend, college. Fourth-round pick Steffen Soberg, the lone player not attending college, played in the GET-ligaen, Norway's highest level of competition. At the 2011 IIHF World U18 Championships, he posted the second-highest save percentage in the tournament and was considered one of Norway's top three players, though no Norwegian goaltender has ever played an NHL game.

Round	#	Player	Position	Nationality	College/Junior/Club team (League)
4	117	Steffen Soberg	G	Norway	Manglerud Star (Norway)
5	147	Patrick Koudys	D	Canada	Rensselaer Polytechnic Institute (ECAC)
6	177	Travis Boyd	C	United States	U.S. National Team Development Program (USHL)
7	207	Garrett Haar	D	United States	Fargo Force (USHL)

Draft notes

- The Capitals' first-round pick in the draft was traded to the Chicago Blackhawks in exchange for Troy Brouwer.
- The Capitals' second-round pick in the draft, along with Brian Pothier and Oskar Osala, was traded to the Carolina Hurricanes in exchange for Joe Corvo in 2010.
- The Capitals' third-round pick in the draft, along with Jake Hauswirth, was traded to the Florida Panthers in exchange for Dennis Wideman.

== See also ==
- 2011–12 NHL season

== Notes ==
1: Washington traded Eric Fehr and Varlamov, while Jason Arnott, Marco Sturm, Scott Hannan, Boyd Gordon and Bradley all left via free agency. All played at least five games for the Capitals during the 2011 playoffs, except Varlamov, who, as the back-up, did not play any games.
2: The NHL uses a point system that awards two points for a win and one point an overtime or shootout loss. The denotation of a team's record is wins-losses-overtime/shootout losses.
3: In ice hockey a combination of a player's goals and assists are collectively called points. Though a lone goal or assist can also be referred to as a point. A point streak consists of registering a point in multiple consecutive games.
