= List of 2011–12 NHL Three Star Awards =

The 2011–12 NHL Three Star Awards are the way the National Hockey League denotes its players of the week and players of the month of the 2011–12 season.

== Weekly ==
Weekly
Week	First Star	Second Star	Third Star
October 16, 2011	Phil Kessel (Toronto Maple Leafs)	John Tavares (New York Islanders)	Kari Lehtonen (Dallas Stars)
October 23, 2011	Jonathan Quick (Los Angeles Kings)	Jason Spezza (Ottawa Senators)	Tomas Vokoun (Washington Capitals)
October 30, 2011	Carey Price (Montreal Canadiens)	Nikolai Khabibulin (Edmonton Oilers)	Jaromir Jagr (Philadelphia Flyers)
November 6, 2011	Josh Harding (Minnesota Wild)	Loui Eriksson (Dallas Stars)	Nicklas Backstrom (Washington Capitals)
November 13, 2011	Tyler Seguin (Boston Bruins)	Jimmy Howard (Detroit Red Wings)	Jonathan Toews (Chicago Blackhawks)
November 20, 2011	Carey Price (Montreal Canadiens)	Marc-Edouard Vlasic (San Jose Sharks)	Matt Read (Philadelphia Flyers)
November 27, 2011	Sidney Crosby (Pittsburgh Penguins)	Cory Schneider (Vancouver Canucks)	Brian Elliott (St. Louis Blues)
December 4, 2011	Matt Moulson (New York Islanders)	Ryan O'Reilly (Colorado Avalanche)	Jonathan Quick (Los Angeles Kings)
December 11, 2011	Jarome Iginla (Calgary Flames)	Matt Hackett (Minnesota Wild)	John Carlson (Washington Capitals)
December 18, 2011	Jason Spezza (Ottawa Senators)	Pekka Rinne (Nashville Predators)	Evgeni Malkin (Pittsburgh Penguins)
December 25, 2011	Brad Marchand (Boston Bruins)	Marian Gaborik (New York Rangers)	Jean-Sebastien Giguere (Colorado Avalanche)
January 1, 2012	Steven Stamkos (Tampa Bay Lightning)	Alexander Ovechkin (Washington Capitals)	Jonathan Quick (Los Angeles Kings)
January 8, 2012	Jamie Benn (Dallas Stars)	Joffrey Lupul (Toronto Maple Leafs)	Craig Anderson (Ottawa Senators)
January 15, 2012	Craig Anderson (Ottawa Senators)	Viktor Stalberg (Chicago Blackhawks)	Evgeni Malkin (Pittsburgh Penguins)
January 22, 2012	Evgeni Malkin (Pittsburgh Penguins)	Scott Hartnell (Philadelphia Flyers)	Evgeni Nabokov (New York Islanders)
January 29, 2012	Mikhail Grabovski (Toronto Maple Leafs)	Pekka Rinne (Nashville Predators)	Daniel Alfredsson (Ottawa Senators)
February 5, 2012	Sam Gagner (Edmonton Oilers)	Ilya Kovalchuk (New Jersey Devils)	James Reimer (Toronto Maple Leafs)
February 12, 2012	Mike Smith (Phoenix Coyotes)	Evgeni Malkin (Pittsburgh Penguins)	David Perron (St. Louis Blues)
February 19, 2012	Jonas Hiller (Anaheim Ducks)	Blake Wheeler (Winnipeg Jets)	Jason Spezza (Ottawa Senators)
February 26, 2012	Erik Karlsson (Ottawa Senators)	Teddy Purcell (Tampa Bay Lightning)	Kari Lehtonen (Dallas Stars)
March 4, 2012	Ryan Miller (Buffalo Sabres)	Niklas Kronwall (Detroit Red Wings)	Ray Emery (Chicago Blackhawks)
March 11, 2012	Ilya Bryzgalov (Philadelphia Flyers)	Ilya Kovalchuk (New Jersey Devils)	Jaroslav Halak (St. Louis Blues)
March 18, 2012	Ilya Bryzgalov (Philadelphia Flyers)	Corey Crawford (Chicago Blackhawks)	Martin Erat (Nashville Predators)
March 25, 2012	Evgeni Malkin (Pittsburgh Penguins)	Ryan Miller (Buffalo Sabres)	Alexander Ovechkin (Washington Capitals)
April 1, 2012	Wayne Simmonds (Philadelphia Flyers)	Zdeno Chara (Boston Bruins)	Mike Smith (Phoenix Coyotes)
April 8, 2012	Mike Smith (Phoenix Coyotes)	Steven Stamkos (Tampa Bay Lightning)	Sidney Crosby (Pittsburgh Penguins)

== Monthly ==
Monthly
Month	First Star	Second Star	Third Star
October	Phil Kessel (Toronto Maple Leafs)	Kari Lehtonen (Dallas Stars)	Nikolai Khabibulin (Edmonton Oilers)
November	Tim Thomas (Boston Bruins)	Jonathan Toews (Chicago Blackhawks)	Joffrey Lupul (Toronto Maple Leafs)
December	Evgeni Malkin (Pittsburgh Penguins)	Steven Stamkos (Tampa Bay Lightning)	Henrik Sedin (Vancouver Canucks)
January	John Tavares (New York Islanders)	Evgeni Malkin (Pittsburgh Penguins)	Pekka Rinne (Nashville Predators)
February	Mike Smith (Phoenix Coyotes)	Erik Karlsson (Ottawa Senators)	Steven Stamkos (Tampa Bay Lightning)
March	Ilya Bryzgalov (Philadelphia Flyers)	Evgeni Malkin (Pittsburgh Penguins)	Ryan Miller (Buffalo Sabres)

== Rookie of the month ==
Rookie of the Month
Month	Player
October	Ryan Nugent-Hopkins (Edmonton Oilers)
November	Ryan Nugent-Hopkins (Edmonton Oilers)
December	Adam Henrique (New Jersey Devils)
January	Cody Hodgson (Vancouver Canucks)
February	Gabriel Landeskog (Colorado Avalanche)
March	Marcus Foligno (Buffalo Sabres)

== See also ==
- Three stars (ice hockey)
