= 2011–12 Boston Bruins season =

NHL team season

2011–12 Boston Bruins
- Northeast Division champions
- Division: 1st Northeast
- Conference: 2nd Eastern
- 2011–12 record: 49–29–4
- Home record: 24–15–3
- Road record: 25–14–1
- Goals for: 262
- Goals against: 202

Team information
- General manager: Peter Chiarelli
- Coach: Claude Julien
- Captain: Zdeno Chara
- Alternate captains: Patrice Bergeron; Andrew Ference; Chris Kelly
- Arena: TD Garden
- Average attendance: 17,565 (100%); Total: 737,730 (42 games)

Team leaders
- Goals: Tyler Seguin (29)
- Assists: Patrice Bergeron (42)
- Points: Tyler Seguin (67)
- Penalty minutes: Shawn Thornton (154)
- Plus/minus: Patrice Bergeron (+36)
- Wins: Tim Thomas (35)
- Goals against average: Anton Khudobin (1.00)

The 2011–12 Boston Bruins season was the 88th season for the National Hockey League (NHL) franchise that was established on November 1, 1924. The Bruins entered the 2011–12 season as the defending Stanley Cup champions.

== Off-season ==
Veteran forward Mark Recchi retired. Forward Michael Ryder went to the Dallas Stars via free agency, and defenseman Tomas Kaberle went to the Carolina Hurricanes. Forward Benoit Pouliot was signed.

== Regular season ==
The Bruins' opened the regular season with a home loss to the Philadelphia Flyers, whom they had swept in round two of the 2011 Stanley Cup playoffs just five months earlier. They recorded their first regular season success against the Tampa Bay Lightning on October 8, a 4–1 home victory against their 2011 Conference Final opponents. The Bruins closed out the month of October with a home-and-home series defeat at the hands of their bitter rivals, the Montreal Canadiens, en route to the worst start by a defending champion since the current playoff platform was adopted in 1994. The back-to-back losses at the hands of their hated rivals proved the catalyst to a resurgence that saw the team secure at least a point in every game through November, the first time the franchise went undefeated in regulation for an entire calendar month since January 1969. During this run, defending Vezina Trophy winner Tim Thomas posted a 9–0–0 record and earned First Star honors for the month.

With a win over the New York Islanders on March 31, the Bruins clinched an Eastern conference playoff berth. On April 1, the Bruins won the Northeast Division title by defeating the New York Rangers, 2–1.

The Bruins allowed only one shorthanded goal all the season, the lowest total of all 30 teams.

== Playoffs ==
The Boston Bruins qualified for the Stanley Cup playoffs for the fifth consecutive season. The Bruins lost in the first round to the Washington Capitals in a seven-game in overtime series 4–3.

== Standings ==
Northeast Division
Pos	Team	GP	W	L	OTL	ROW	GF	GA	GD	Pts
1	y – Boston Bruins	82	49	29	4	40	269	202	+67	102
2	x – Ottawa Senators	82	41	31	10	35	249	240	+9	92
3	Buffalo Sabres	82	39	32	11	32	218	230	−12	89
4	Toronto Maple Leafs	82	35	37	10	31	231	264	−33	80
5	Montreal Canadiens	82	31	35	16	26	212	226	−14	78

Source: National Hockey League
x – Clinched playoff spot; y – Clinched division

Eastern Conference
Pos	Div	Team	GP	W	L	OTL	ROW	GF	GA	GD	Pts
1	AT	z – New York Rangers	82	51	24	7	47	226	187	+39	109
2	NE	y – Boston Bruins	82	49	29	4	40	269	202	+67	102
3	SE	y – Florida Panthers	82	38	26	18	32	203	227	−24	94
4	AT	x – Pittsburgh Penguins	82	51	25	6	42	282	221	+61	108
5	AT	x – Philadelphia Flyers	82	47	26	9	43	264	232	+32	103
6	AT	x – New Jersey Devils	82	48	28	6	36	228	209	+19	102
7	SE	x – Washington Capitals	82	42	32	8	38	222	230	−8	92
8	NE	x – Ottawa Senators	82	41	31	10	35	249	240	+9	92
9	NE	Buffalo Sabres	82	39	32	11	32	218	230	−12	89
10	SE	Tampa Bay Lightning	82	38	36	8	35	235	281	−46	84
11	SE	Winnipeg Jets	82	37	35	10	33	225	246	−21	84
12	SE	Carolina Hurricanes	82	33	33	16	32	213	243	−30	82
13	NE	Toronto Maple Leafs	82	35	37	10	31	231	264	−33	80
14	AT	New York Islanders	82	34	37	11	27	203	255	−52	79
15	NE	Montreal Canadiens	82	31	35	16	26	212	226	−14	78

Source: National Hockey League
x – Clinched playoff spot; y – Clinched division; z – Clinched conference

== Schedule and results ==
=== Pre-season ===
2011 Pre-season
#	Date	Visitor	Score	Home	OT	Decision	Record	Recap
1	September 21	Boston Bruins	1–2	Ottawa Senators	OT	Tuukka Rask	0–0–1
2	September 23	New York Islanders	3–6	Boston Bruins		Tim Thomas	1–0–1
3	September 25	Montreal Canadiens	3–7	Boston Bruins^{1}		Anton Khudobin	2–0–1
4	September 26	Boston Bruins	2–1	Montreal Canadiens		Tuukka Rask	3–0–1
5	September 29	Ottawa Senators	2–1	Boston Bruins		Tim Thomas	3–1–1
6	October 1	Boston Bruins	3–2	New York Islanders^{2}		Tim Thomas	4–1–1
Match played at Halifax Metro Centre in Halifax, Nova Scotia.; Match played at Webster Bank Arena in Bridgeport, Connecticut.

=== Regular season ===
2011–12 game log

October: 3–7–0 (home: 2–5–0; road: 1–2–0)
#	Date	Visitor	Score	Home	OT	Decision	Attendance	Record	Pts	Recap
1	October 6	Philadelphia Flyers	2–1	Boston Bruins		Tim Thomas	17,565	0–1–0	0
2	October 8	Tampa Bay Lightning	1–4	Boston Bruins		Tim Thomas	17,565	1–1–0	2
3	October 10	Colorado Avalanche	1–0	Boston Bruins		Tuukka Rask	17,565	1–2–0	2
4	October 12	Boston Bruins	2–3	Carolina Hurricanes		Tim Thomas	16,483	1–3–0	2
5	October 15	Boston Bruins	3–2	Chicago Blackhawks	SO	Tim Thomas	22,073	2–3–0	4
6	October 18	Carolina Hurricanes	4–1	Boston Bruins		Tuukka Rask	17,565	2–4–0	4
7	October 20	Toronto Maple Leafs	2–6	Boston Bruins		Tim Thomas	17,565	3–4–0	6
8	October 22	San Jose Sharks	4–2	Boston Bruins		Tim Thomas	17,565	3–5–0	6
9	October 27	Montreal Canadiens	2–1	Boston Bruins		Tim Thomas	17,565	3–6–0	6
10	October 29	Boston Bruins	2–4	Montreal Canadiens		Tuukka Rask	21,273	3–7–0	6

November: 12–0–1 (home: 7–0–1; road: 5–0–0)
#	Date	Visitor	Score	Home	OT	Decision	Attendance	Record	Pts	Recap
11	November 1	Ottawa Senators	3–5	Boston Bruins		Tim Thomas	17,565	4–7–0	8
12	November 5	Boston Bruins	7–0	Toronto Maple Leafs		Tim Thomas	19,497	5–7–0	10
13	November 7	New York Islanders	2–6	Boston Bruins		Tuukka Rask	17,565	6–7–0	12
14	November 10	Edmonton Oilers	3–6	Boston Bruins		Tuukka Rask	17,565	7–7–0	14
15	November 12	Buffalo Sabres	2–6	Boston Bruins		Tim Thomas	17,565	8–7–0	16
16	November 15	New Jersey Devils	3–4	Boston Bruins		Tim Thomas	17,565	9–7–0	18
17	November 17	Columbus Blue Jackets	1–2	Boston Bruins	SO	Tuukka Rask	17,565	10–7–0	20
18	November 19	Boston Bruins	6–0	New York Islanders		Tim Thomas	16,011	11–7–0	22
19	November 21	Boston Bruins	1–0	Montreal Canadiens		Tim Thomas	21,273	12–7–0	24
20	November 23	Boston Bruins	4–3	Buffalo Sabres	SO	Tim Thomas	18,690	13–7–0	26
21	November 25	Detroit Red Wings	3–2	Boston Bruins	SO	Tuukka Rask	17,565	13–7–1	27
22	November 26	Winnipeg Jets	2–4	Boston Bruins		Tim Thomas	17,565	14–7–1	29
23	November 30	Boston Bruins	6–3	Toronto Maple Leafs		Tim Thomas	19,643	15–7–1	31

December: 9–3–0 (home: 4–1–0; road: 5–2–0)
#	Date	Visitor	Score	Home	OT	Decision	Attendance	Record	Pts	Recap
24	December 3	Toronto Maple Leafs	1–4	Boston Bruins		Tuukka Rask	17,565	16–7–1	33
25	December 5	Boston Bruins	3–1	Pittsburgh Penguins		Tim Thomas	18,585	17–7–1	35
26	December 6	Boston Bruins	1–2	Winnipeg Jets		Tuukka Rask	15,004	17–8–1	35
27	December 8	Florida Panthers	2–0	Boston Bruins		Tim Thomas	17,565	17–9–1	35
28	December 10	Boston Bruins	5–3	Columbus Blue Jackets		Tuukka Rask	18,175	18–9–1	37
29	December 13	Los Angeles Kings	0–3	Boston Bruins		Tuukka Rask	17,565	19–9–1	39
30	December 14	Boston Bruins	5–2	Ottawa Senators		Tim Thomas	18,088	20–9–1	41
31	December 17	Boston Bruins	6–0	Philadelphia Flyers		Tim Thomas	19,948	21–9–1	43
32	December 19	Montreal Canadiens	2–3	Boston Bruins		Tim Thomas	17,565	22–9–1	45
33	December 23	Florida Panthers	0–8	Boston Bruins		Tuukka Rask	17,565	23–9–1	47
34	December 28	Boston Bruins	2–1	Phoenix Coyotes	OT	Tuukka Rask	17,459	24–9–1	49
35	December 31	Boston Bruins	2–4	Dallas Stars		Tim Thomas	18,532	24–10–1	49

January: 8–4–1 (home: 4–1–1; road: 4–3–0)
#	Date	Visitor	Score	Home	OT	Decision	Attendance	Record	Pts	Recap
36	January 4	Boston Bruins	6–1	New Jersey Devils		Tim Thomas	15,832	25–10–1	51
37	January 5	Calgary Flames	0–9	Boston Bruins		Tuukka Rask	17,565	26–10–1	53
38	January 7	Vancouver Canucks	4–3	Boston Bruins		Tim Thomas	17,565	26–11–1	53
39	January 10	Winnipeg Jets	3–5	Boston Bruins		Tuukka Rask	17,565	27–11–1	55
40	January 12	Montreal Canadiens	1–2	Boston Bruins		Tim Thomas	17,565	28–11–1	57
41	January 14	Boston Bruins	2–4	Carolina Hurricanes		Tim Thomas	18,680	28–12–1	57
42	January 16	Boston Bruins	3–2	Florida Panthers	SO	Tuukka Rask	19,018	29–12–1	59
43	January 17	Boston Bruins	3–5	Tampa Bay Lightning		Tim Thomas	19,204	29–13–1	59
44	January 19	Boston Bruins	4–1	New Jersey Devils		Tim Thomas	14,941	30–13–1	61
45	January 21	New York Rangers	3–2	Boston Bruins	OT	Tuukka Rask	17,565	30–13–2	62
46	January 22	Boston Bruins	6–5	Philadelphia Flyers	SO	Tim Thomas	19,851	31–13–2	64
47	January 24	Boston Bruins	3–5	Washington Capitals		Tuukka Rask	18,506	31–14–2	64
48	January 31	Ottawa Senators	3–4	Boston Bruins		Tim Thomas	17,565	32–14–2	66

February: 5–7–1 (home: 1–4–0; road: 4–3–1)
#	Date	Visitor	Score	Home	OT	Decision	Attendance	Record	Pts	Recap
49	February 2	Carolina Hurricanes	3–0	Boston Bruins		Tuukka Rask	17,565	32–15–2	66
50	February 4	Pittsburgh Penguins	2–1	Boston Bruins		Tim Thomas	17,565	32–16–2	66
51	February 5	Boston Bruins	4–1	Washington Capitals		Tim Thomas	18,506	33–16–2	68
52	February 8	Boston Bruins	0–6	Buffalo Sabres		Tuukka Rask	18,690	33–17–2	68
53	February 11	Nashville Predators	3–4	Boston Bruins	SO	Tim Thomas	17,565	34–17–2	70
54	February 14	New York Rangers	3–0	Boston Bruins		Tim Thomas	17,565	34–18–2	70
55	February 15	Boston Bruins	4–3	Montreal Canadiens	SO	Tim Thomas	21,273	35–18–2	72
56	February 17	Boston Bruins	2–4	Winnipeg Jets		Tuukka Rask	15,004	35–19–2	72
57	February 19	Boston Bruins	0–2	Minnesota Wild		Tim Thomas	19,198	35–20–2	72
58	February 22	Boston Bruins	4–2	St. Louis Blues		Tim Thomas	18,460	36–20–2	74
59	February 24	Boston Bruins	1–2	Buffalo Sabres	SO	Tuukka Rask	18,690	36–20–3	75
60	February 25	Boston Bruins	5–3	Ottawa Senators		Tim Thomas	19,444	37–20–3	77
61	February 28	Ottawa Senators	1–0	Boston Bruins		Tim Thomas	17,565	37–21–3	77

March: 9–8–1 (home: 5–3–1; road: 4–5–0)
#	Date	Visitor	Score	Home	OT	Decision	Attendance	Record	Pts	Recap
62	March 1	New Jersey Devils	3–4	Boston Bruins	OT	Tim Thomas	17,565	38–21–3	79
63	March 3	New York Islanders	3–2	Boston Bruins		Tim Thomas	17,565	38–22–3	79
64	March 4	Boston Bruins	3–4	New York Rangers		Tim Thomas	18,200	38–23–3	79
65	March 6	Boston Bruins	5–4	Toronto Maple Leafs		Tim Thomas	19,684	39–23–3	81
66	March 8	Buffalo Sabres	1–3	Boston Bruins		Tim Thomas	17,565	40–23–3	83
67	March 10	Washington Capitals	4–3	Boston Bruins		Tim Thomas	17,565	40–24–3	83
68	March 11	Boston Bruins	2–5	Pittsburgh Penguins		Tim Thomas	18,609	40–25–3	83
69	March 13	Boston Bruins	1–6	Tampa Bay Lightning		Marty Turco	19,204	40–26–3	83
70	March 15	Boston Bruins	2–6	Florida Panthers		Tim Thomas	19,004	40–27–3	83
71	March 17	Philadelphia Flyers	2–3	Boston Bruins	SO	Tim Thomas	17,565	41–27–3	85
72	March 19	Toronto Maple Leafs	0–8	Boston Bruins		Tim Thomas	17,565	42–27–3	87
73	March 22	Boston Bruins	1–2	San Jose Sharks		Tim Thomas	17,562	42–28–3	87
74	March 24	Boston Bruins	4–2	Los Angeles Kings		Tim Thomas	18,310	43–28–3	89
75	March 25	Boston Bruins	3–2	Anaheim Ducks		Marty Turco	17,395	44–28–3	91
76	March 27	Tampa Bay Lightning	2–5	Boston Bruins		Tim Thomas	17,565	45–28–3	93
77	March 29	Washington Capitals	3–2	Boston Bruins	SO	Tim Thomas	17,565	45–28–4	94
78	March 31	Boston Bruins	6–3	New York Islanders		Marty Turco	16,250	46–28–4	96

April: 3–1–0 (home: 1–1–0; road: 2–0–0)
#	Date	Visitor	Score	Home	OT	Decision	Attendance	Record	Pts	Recap
79	April 1	Boston Bruins	2–1	New York Rangers		Tim Thomas	18,200	47–28–4	98
80	April 3	Pittsburgh Penguins	5–3	Boston Bruins		Marty Turco	17,565	47–29–4	98
81	April 5	Boston Bruins	3–1	Ottawa Senators		Anton Khudobin	20,500	48–29–4	100
82	April 7	Buffalo Sabres	3–4	Boston Bruins	SO	Tim Thomas	17,565	49–29–4	102

Legend: Win (2 points) Loss (0 points) Overtime/shootout loss (1 point)

=== Playoffs ===
2012 Stanley Cup Playoffs

Eastern Conference Quarter-finals vs E7 Washington Capitals: 3–4 (Home: 1–3; Road: 2–1)
#	Date	Visitor	Score	Home	OT	Boston goals	Washington goals	Decision	Attendance	Series	Recap
1	April 12	Washington Capitals	0–1	Boston Bruins	1:18	Kelly		Thomas	17,565	1–0
2	April 14	Washington Capitals	2–1	Boston Bruins	22:56	Pouliot	Brouwer, Backstrom	Thomas	17,565	1–1
3	April 16	Boston Bruins	4–3	Washington Capitals		Peverley, Paille, Rolston, Chara	Semin, Ovechkin, Laich	Thomas	18,506	2–1
4	April 19	Boston Bruins	1–2	Washington Capitals		Peverley	Johansson, Semin	Thomas	18,506	2–2
5	April 21	Washington Capitals	4–3	Boston Bruins		Seidenberg, Marchand, Boychuk	Semin, Beagle, Knuble, Brouwer	Thomas	17,565	2–3
6	April 22	Boston Bruins	4–3	Washington Capitals	3:17	Peverley, Krejci, Ference, Seguin	Green, Chimera, Ovechkin	Thomas	18,506	3–3
7	April 25	Washington Capitals	2–1	Boston Bruins	2:57	Seguin	Hendricks, Ward	Thomas	17,565	3–4

- Scorer of game-winning goal in italics

== Player statistics ==
=== Skaters ===
Note: GP = Games played; G = Goals; A = Assists; Pts = Points; +/- = Plus–minus; PIM = Penalty minutes

Regular season

Player	GP	G	A	Pts	+/-	PIM
Tyler Seguin	81	29	38	67	34	30
Patrice Bergeron	81	22	42	64	36	20
David Krejci	79	23	39	62	−5	36
Milan Lucic	81	26	35	61	7	135
Brad Marchand	76	28	27	55	31	87
Zdeno Chara	79	12	40	52	33	86
Rich Peverley	57	11	31	42	20	22
Chris Kelly	82	20	19	39	33	41
Nathan Horton	46	17	15	32	0	54
Benoit Pouliot	74	16	16	32	18	38
Joe Corvo	75	4	21	25	10	13
Andrew Ference	72	6	18	24	9	46
Dennis Seidenberg	80	5	18	23	15	39
Gregory Campbell	78	8	8	16	–3	80
Brian Rolston^{†}	21	3	12	15	7	8
Johnny Boychuk	77	5	10	15	27	53
Daniel Paille	69	9	6	15	−5	15
Jordan Caron	48	7	8	15	0	14
Shawn Thornton	81	5	8	13	−7	154
Adam McQuaid	72	2	8	10	16	99
Greg Zanon^{†}	17	1	1	2	4	4
Zach Hamill	16	0	2	2	3	4
Steven Kampfer^{‡}	10	0	2	2	6	4
Carter Camper	3	1	0	1	1	0
Torey Krug	2	0	1	1	0	0
Tim Thomas^{(G)}	58	0	1	1	—	0
Trent Whitfield	1	0	0	0	0	0
Mike Mottau^{†}	6	0	0	0	–1	0
Josh Hennessy	3	0	0	0	1	2
Max Sauve	1	0	0	0	0	0
Matt Bartkowski	3	0	0	0	−2	0
Lane MacDermid	5	0	0	0	−2	5
Tuukka Rask^{(G)}	23	0	0	0	—	2
Marty Turco^{(G)}	4	0	0	0	—	2
Team Totals	—	251	412	663	+60	1071

- ^{†}Denotes player spent time with another team before joining Bruins. Stats reflect time with the Bruins only.
- ^{‡}Denotes player was traded mid-season. Stats reflect time with the Bruins only.
- (G)Denotes goaltender.
- Team PIM totals include bench infractions.

Playoffs

Player	GP	G	A	Pts	+/-	PIM
Rich Peverley	7	3	2	5	0	4
Andrew Ference	7	1	3	4	–2	0
Brian Rolston	7	1	2	3	–2	0
Zdeno Chara	7	1	2	3	–1	8
Chris Kelly	7	1	2	3	1	4
Dennis Seidenberg	7	1	2	3	1	2
Johnny Boychuk	7	1	2	3	1	4
David Krejci	7	1	2	3	0	4
Milan Lucic	7	0	3	3	2	8
Tyler Seguin	7	2	1	3	3	0
Gregory Campbell	7	0	2	2	–1	0
Patrice Bergeron	7	0	2	2	0	8
Benoit Pouliot	7	1	1	2	–1	6
Brad Marchand	7	1	1	2	–1	2
Greg Zanon	7	0	1	1	0	0
Daniel Paille	7	1	0	1	–1	2
Shawn Thornton	5	0	0	0	0	0
Joe Corvo	5	0	0	0	3	0
Mike Mottau	2	0	0	0	–2	0
Jordan Caron	2	0	0	0	–1	0
Tim Thomas^{(G)}	7	0	0	0	—	0
Team Totals	—	15	28	43	0	52

=== Goaltenders ===
Note: GPI = Games played in; MIN = Minutes played; GAA = Goals against average; W = Wins; L = Losses; OT = Overtime/shootout losses; SO = Shutouts; SA = Shots against; GA = Goals against; SV% = Save percentage

Regular season

Player	GPI	MIN	GAA	W	L	OT	SO	SA	GA	SV%
Tim Thomas	59	3352	2.36	35	19	1	5	1659	132	.920
Tuukka Rask	23	1289	2.05	11	8	3	3	621	44	.929
Marty Turco	5	261	3.68	2	2	0	0	110	16	.855
Anton Khudobin	1	60	1.00	1	0	0	0	45	1	.978
Combined	—	4778	2.31	47	28	4	8	2335	184	.921

Playoffs

Player	GPI	MIN	GAA	W	L	SO	SA	GA	SV%
Tim Thomas	7	448	2.14	3	4	1	207	16	.923

== Awards and records ==
=== Awards ===
Player'	Award	Notes
Tyler Seguin	NHL First Star of the Week	November 14, 2011
Tim Thomas	NHL First Star of the Month	November 2011
Brad Marchand	NHL First Star of the Week	December 26, 2011
Zdeno Chara	NHL Second Star of the Week	April 2, 2012

=== Milestones ===
Regular season
Player	Milestone	Reached
David Krejci	300th career NHL game	October 8, 2011
Brad Marchand	100th career NHL game	October 10, 2011
Chris Kelly	500th career NHL game	November 7, 2011
Adam McQuaid	100th career NHL game	November 21, 2011
Milan Lucic	300th career NHL game	November 26, 2011
Rich Peverley	100th career NHL assist	November 26, 2011
Benoit Pouliot	200th career NHL game	November 26, 2011
Rich Peverley	300th career NHL game	December 6, 2011
Tyler Seguin	100th career NHL game	December 8, 2011
Milan Lucic	100th career NHL assist	December 10, 2011
Chris Kelly	200th career NHL point	December 14, 2011
Shawn Thornton	400th career NHL game	December 17, 2011
Joe Corvo	600th career NHL game	December 19, 2011
Zdeno Chara	300th career NHL assist	January 5, 2012
Patrice Bergeron	500th career NHL game	January 19, 2012
Dennis Seidenberg	500th career NHL game	January 21, 2012
Tuukka Rask	100th career NHL game	February 17, 2012
Carter Camper	1st career NHL game	February 22, 2012
Carter Camper	1st career NHL goal 1st career NHL point	February 25, 2012
Gregory Campbell	500th career NHL game	February 25, 2012
Lane MacDermid	1st career NHL game	March 11, 2012
Joe Corvo	200th career NHL assist	March 6, 2012
Milan Lucic	200th career NHL point	March 6, 2012
Max Sauve	1st career NHL game	March 11, 2012
Andrew Ference	700th career NHL game	March 15, 2012
Zdeno Chara	1,000th career NHL game	March 24, 2012
Benoit Pouliot	100th career NHL point	March 25, 2012
Johnny Boychuk	200th career NHL game	March 31, 2012
Torey Krug	1st career NHL game	April 3, 2012
Torey Krug	1st career NHL assist 1st career NHL point	April 5, 2012
Patrice Bergeron	400th career NHL point	April 7, 2012

== Transactions ==
The Bruins have been involved in the following transactions during the 2011–12 season, or the off-season between the previous season and this season.

=== Trades ===
July 5, 2011	To Carolina Hurricanes 4th-round pick in 2012	To Boston Bruins Joe Corvo
February 27, 2012	To New York Islanders Marc Cantin; Yannick Riendeau	To Boston Bruins Mike Mottau; Brian Rolston
February 27, 2012	To Minnesota Wild Steven Kampfer	To Boston Bruins Greg Zanon
March 20, 2012	To New York Islanders Yury Alexandrov	To Boston Bruins Future considerations
May 26, 2012	To Washington Capitals Zach Hamill	To Boston Bruins Chris Bourque

=== Free agents signed ===
Player	Former team	Contract terms
Benoit Pouliot	Montreal Canadiens	1 year, $1.1 million
Josh Hennessy	HC Lugano	1 year, $600,000
Jamie Tardif	Grand Rapids Griffins	2 years, $1.2 million
Marty Turco	Red Bull Salzburg	1 year, $600,000
Adam Morrison	Vancouver Giants	3 years, $1.935 million entry-level contract
Torey Krug	Michigan State University	3 years, $2.75 million entry-level contract
Niklas Svedberg	Brynas IF	2 years, $1.7175 million entry-level contract

=== Free agents lost ===
Player	New team	Contract terms
Michael Ryder	Dallas Stars	2 years, $7 million
Boris Valabik	Pittsburgh Penguins	1 year, $550,000
Tomas Kaberle	Carolina Hurricanes	3 years, $12.75 million
David Laliberte	EHC Wolfsburg	1 year

=== Claimed via waivers ===
Player	Former team	Date claimed off waivers

=== Lost via waivers ===
Player	New team	Date claimed off waivers

=== Lost via retirement ===
Player
Mark Recchi

=== Player signings ===
Player	Date	Contract terms
Anton Khudobin	July 1, 2011	2 years, $1.75 million
Trent Whitfield	July 1, 2011	2 years, $1.15 million
Adam McQuaid	July 14, 2011	3 years, $4.7 million
Craig Cunningham	July 14, 2011	3 years, $1.845 million entry-level contract
Zach McKelvie	July 14, 2011	1 year, $600,000
Stefan Chaput	July 20, 2011	1 year, $577,500
Jared Knight	July 20, 2011	3 years, $2.17 million entry-level contract
Ryan Spooner	July 20, 2011	3 years, $2.17 million entry-level contract
Andrew Bodnarchuk	September 9, 2011	1 year, $635,250
Brad Marchand	September 14, 2011	2 years, $5 million
Rich Peverley	October 11, 2011	3 years, $9.75 million contract extension
David Krejci	December 1, 2011	3 years, $15.75 million contract extension
Dougie Hamilton	December 8, 2011	3 years, $2.775 million entry-level contract
Johnny Boychuk	February 14, 2012	3 years, $10.08 million contract extension
Shawn Thornton	March 19, 2012	2 years, $2.2 million contract extension
Justin Florek	March 25, 2012	2 years, $1.38 million entry-level contract
Zach Trotman	March 25, 2012	2 years, $1.33 million entry-level contract
Tommy Cross	April 10, 2012	2 years, $1.575 million entry-level contract

== Draft picks ==
Boston's picks at the 2011 NHL entry draft in St. Paul, Minnesota.

Round	s#	Player	Position	Nationality	College/junior/club team (league)
1	9^{a}	Dougie Hamilton	Defense	Canada	Niagara IceDogs (OHL)
2	40^{b}	Alexander Khokhlachev	Left wing	Russia	Windsor Spitfires (OHL)
3	81^{c}	Anthony Camara	Left wing	Canada	Saginaw Spirit (OHL)
4	121	Brian Ferlin	Right wing	United States	Indiana Ice (USHL)
5	151	Rob O'Gara	Defense	United States	Milton Academy (USHS–MA)
6	181	Lars Volden	Goaltender	Norway	Espoo Blues (SM-liiga)

Notes on draft picks

- ^aBoston acquired this pick as part of a trade on September 18, 2009, that sent Phil Kessel to Toronto.
- ^bBoston acquired this pick as part of a trade on October 18, 2009, that sent Chuck Kobasew to Minnesota in exchange for Craig Weller and Alexander Fallstrom.
- ^cBoston acquired this pick as the result of a trade on March 3, 2010, that sent Derek Morris to Phoenix.
- The Bruins' first-round pick, 30th overall, was traded to Toronto as a result of the trade that sent Tomas Kaberle to Boston.
- The Bruins' second-round pick, 61st overall, went to Ottawa as the result of the trade that sent Chris Kelly to Boston.
- The Bruins' third-round pick, 91st overall, went to Florida as the result of the trade that sent Nathan Horton and Gregory Campbell to Boston.
- The Bruins' seventh-round pick, 211th overall, went to Chicago as the result of the trade that sent a seventh-round pick in 2010 to Boston.

== See also ==
- 2011–12 NHL season
