= 2011–12 Philadelphia Flyers season =

NHL hockey team season

2011–12 Philadelphia Flyers
- Division: 3rd Atlantic
- Conference: 5th Eastern
- 2011–12 record: 47–26–9
- Home record: 22–13–6
- Road record: 25–13–3
- Goals for: 264
- Goals against: 232

Team information
- General manager: Paul Holmgren
- Coach: Peter Laviolette
- Captain: Chris Pronger
- Alternate captains: Danny Briere; Kimmo Timonen; Claude Giroux
- Arena: Wells Fargo Center
- Average attendance: 20,433 (107.4%)
- Minor league affiliates: Adirondack Phantoms; Trenton Titans

Team leaders
- Goals: Scott Hartnell (37)
- Assists: Claude Giroux (65)
- Points: Claude Giroux (93)
- Penalty minutes: Zac Rinaldo (232)
- Plus/minus: Scott Hartnell (+19)
- Wins: Ilya Bryzgalov (33)
- Goals against average: Ilya Bryzgalov (2.48)

The 2011–12 Philadelphia Flyers season was the franchise's 45th season in the National Hockey League (NHL). The Flyers lost in the second round of the 2012 Stanley Cup playoffs to their local rivals, the New Jersey Devils, in five games.

In July 2011, veteran Jaromir Jagr joined the Flyers as a free agent, his first time in the NHL since the 2007–08 season. The season was also Chris Pronger's last in the NHL. After appearing in three Stanley Cup Final series and winning one with the 2006–07 Anaheim Ducks, Pronger had not played since November 2011 after battling several injuries and suffering from post-concussion syndrome. In 2013, Claude Giroux would replace Pronger as the Flyers' captain.

== Off-season ==
Following his penchant for making big moves, Flyers general manager Paul Holmgren pulled off perhaps the most stunning move of his tenure, trading captain Mike Richards to the Los Angeles Kings in exchange for Brayden Schenn, Wayne Simmonds and a 2012 second-round draft pick, as well as Jeff Carter to the Columbus Blue Jackets for their 2011 first-round pick (Sean Couturier) and Jakub Voracek, all within the span of one hour on June 23. Later that same day, Holmgren addressed the Flyers' long-standing goaltending issues by signing the Phoenix Coyotes' Ilya Bryzgalov to a nine-year, $51 million contract. On July 1, the Flyers signed Jaromir Jagr to a one-year contract, Maxime Talbot to a five-year contract and Andreas Lilja to a two-year contract.

== Regular season ==
Chris Pronger was named the Flyers' captain; however, 13 games into the season, he was lost for the remainder of the regular season and playoffs with severe post-concussion syndrome.

Bryzgalov's play ranged from spectacular to subpar, including being benched in favor of Sergei Bobrovsky for the Flyers' 3–2 loss to the New York Rangers in the 2012 Winter Classic. Twelve rookies played for the Flyers during the season, with the play of Sean Couturier, Brayden Schenn and Matt Read standing out impressively.

The Flyers concluded the regular season with the most powerplay opportunities of all teams (335), the most powerplay goals scored (66) and the most powerplay opportunities against (319).

=== Season standings ===
Atlantic Division
Pos	Team	GP	W	L	OTL	ROW	GF	GA	GD	Pts
1	New York Rangers	82	51	24	7	47	226	187	+39	109
2	Pittsburgh Penguins	82	51	25	6	42	282	221	+61	108
3	Philadelphia Flyers	82	47	26	9	43	264	232	+32	103
4	New Jersey Devils	82	48	28	6	36	228	209	+19	102
5	New York Islanders	82	34	37	11	27	203	255	−52	79

Source: National Hockey League

Eastern Conference
Pos	Div	Team	GP	W	L	OTL	ROW	GF	GA	GD	Pts
1	AT	z – New York Rangers	82	51	24	7	47	226	187	+39	109
2	NE	y – Boston Bruins	82	49	29	4	40	269	202	+67	102
3	SE	y – Florida Panthers	82	38	26	18	32	203	227	−24	94
4	AT	x – Pittsburgh Penguins	82	51	25	6	42	282	221	+61	108
5	AT	x – Philadelphia Flyers	82	47	26	9	43	264	232	+32	103
6	AT	x – New Jersey Devils	82	48	28	6	36	228	209	+19	102
7	SE	x – Washington Capitals	82	42	32	8	38	222	230	−8	92
8	NE	x – Ottawa Senators	82	41	31	10	35	249	240	+9	92
9	NE	Buffalo Sabres	82	39	32	11	32	218	230	−12	89
10	SE	Tampa Bay Lightning	82	38	36	8	35	235	281	−46	84
11	SE	Winnipeg Jets	82	37	35	10	33	225	246	−21	84
12	SE	Carolina Hurricanes	82	33	33	16	32	213	243	−30	82
13	NE	Toronto Maple Leafs	82	35	37	10	31	231	264	−33	80
14	AT	New York Islanders	82	34	37	11	27	203	255	−52	79
15	NE	Montreal Canadiens	82	31	35	16	26	212	226	−14	78

Source: National Hockey League
x – Clinched playoff spot; y – Clinched division; z – Clinched conference

== Playoffs ==
The Flyers drew the Pittsburgh Penguins in the first round of the playoffs, a series in which the two teams combined for an NHL-record 45 goals in the first four games and a total of 309 penalty minutes in an intense, fight-filled series. The Flyers pulled off the upset in six games against a Pittsburgh team that was heavily favored to win the Stanley Cup. But in the second round against the New Jersey Devils, the Flyers' run-and-gun style of play was stymied by the Devils' forechecking and defense, and the Flyers were eliminated in five games. Claude Giroux missed the fifth and deciding game after being suspended for a hit to the head of New Jersey's Dainius Zubrus late in game four.

== Schedule and results ==
=== Preseason ===
2011 preseason
Preseason: 4–2–1 (home: 2–1–1; road: 2–1–0)

Game	Date	Score	Opponent	Decision	Attendance	Record	Recap
1	September 20	4–0	@ Toronto Maple Leafs	Bobrovsky	18,480	1–0–0	W
2	September 21	2–4	Toronto Maple Leafs	Bryzgalov	19,452	1–1–0	L
3^{[a]}	September 22	3–4 (SO)	Detroit Red Wings	Leighton	n/a	1–1–1	OTL
4	September 23	3–1	@ Detroit Red Wings	Bobrovsky	14,310	2–1–1	W
5	September 26	5–3	New York Rangers	Bryzgalov	19,657	3–1–1	W
6	September 29	2–1	New Jersey Devils	Bobrovsky	19,722	4–1–1	W
7	October 1	1–2	@ New Jersey Devils	Bryzgalov	12,729	4–2–1	L
Notes:^{a} Game played at John Labatt Centre in London, Ontario.

Legend: W Win (2 points) L Loss (0 points) OTL Overtime/shootout loss (1 point)

=== Regular season ===
2011–12 regular season
October: 6–4–1, 13 points (home: 3–3–1; road: 3–1–0)

Game	Date	Score	Opponent	Decision	Attendance	Record	Points	Recap
1	October 6	2–1	@ Boston Bruins	Bryzgalov	17,565	1–0–0	2	W
2	October 8	3–0	@ New Jersey Devils	Bryzgalov	17,625	2–0–0	4	W
3	October 12	5–4	Vancouver Canucks	Bryzgalov	19,632	3–0–0	6	W
4	October 15	2–3 (OT)	Los Angeles Kings	Bryzgalov	19,644	3–0–1	7	OTL
5	October 18	7–2	@ Ottawa Senators	Bobrovsky	18,059	4–0–1	9	W
6	October 20	2–5	Washington Capitals	Bryzgalov	19,658	4–1–1	9	L
7	October 22	2–4	St. Louis Blues	Bryzgalov	19,593	4–2–1	9	L
8	October 24	4–2	Toronto Maple Leafs	Bobrovsky	19,569	5–2–1	11	W
9	October 26	1–5	@ Montreal Canadiens	Bryzgalov	21,273	5–3–1	11	L
10	October 27	8–9	Winnipeg Jets	Bryzgalov	19,588	5–4–1	11	L
11	October 29	5–1	Carolina Hurricanes	Bryzgalov	19,683	6–4–1	13	W

November: 7–3–2, 16 points (home: 3–1–1; road: 4–2–1)

Game	Date	Score	Opponent	Decision	Attendance	Record	Points	Recap
12	November 2	3–2	@ Buffalo Sabres	Bryzgalov	18,299	7–4–1	15	W
13	November 3	3–4 (SO)	New Jersey Devils	Bobrovsky	19,667	7–4–2	16	OTL
14	November 5	9–2	Columbus Blue Jackets	Bryzgalov	19,784	8–4–2	18	W
15	November 9	1–2 (OT)	@ Tampa Bay Lightning	Bryzgalov	19,204	8–4–3	19	OTL
16	November 13	3–2	@ Florida Panthers	Bryzgalov	15,215	9–4–3	21	W
17	November 14	5–3	@ Carolina Hurricanes	Bobrovsky	14,491	10–4–3	23	W
18	November 17	2–1	Phoenix Coyotes	Bryzgalov	19,610	11–4–3	25	W
19	November 19	4–6	@ Winnipeg Jets	Bobrovsky	15,004	11–5–3	25	L
20	November 21	2–4	Carolina Hurricanes	Bryzgalov	19,632	11–6–3	25	L
21	November 23	4–3 (OT)	@ New York Islanders	Bobrovsky	11,086	12–6–3	27	W
22	November 25	3–1	Montreal Canadiens	Bobrovsky	19,991	13–6–3	29	W
23	November 26	0–2	@ New York Rangers	Bobrovsky	18,200	13–7–3	29	L

December: 9–3–1, 19 points (home: 2–1–0; road: 7–2–1)

Game	Date	Score	Opponent	Decision	Attendance	Record	Points	Recap
24	December 2	4–3 (OT)	@ Anaheim Ducks	Bryzgalov	15,975	14–7–3	31	W
25	December 3	4–2	@ Phoenix Coyotes	Bryzgalov	14,913	15–7–3	33	W
26	December 7	5–4 (OT)	@ Buffalo Sabres	Bryzgalov	18,690	16–7–3	35	W
27	December 8	3–2	Pittsburgh Penguins	Bryzgalov	19,936	17–7–3	37	W
28	December 10	5–2	Tampa Bay Lightning	Bryzgalov	19,772	18–7–3	39	W
29	December 13	5–1	@ Washington Capitals	Bryzgalov	18,506	19–7–3	41	W
30	December 15	4–3	@ Montreal Canadiens	Bobrovsky	21,273	20–7–3	43	W
31	December 17	0–6	Boston Bruins	Bryzgalov	19,948	20–8–3	43	L
32	December 19	2–3 (SO)	@ Colorado Avalanche	Bryzgalov	14,889	20–8–4	44	OTL
33	December 21	4–1	@ Dallas Stars	Bobrovsky	15,061	21–8–4	46	W
34	December 23	2–4	@ New York Rangers	Bryzgalov	18,200	21–9–4	46	L
35	December 27	1–5	@ Tampa Bay Lightning	Bryzgalov	19,204	21–10–4	46	L
36	December 29	4–2	@ Pittsburgh Penguins	Bobrovsky	18,602	22–10–4	48	W

January: 7–4–2, 16 points (home: 3–2–2; road: 4–2–0)

Game	Date	Score	Opponent	Decision	Attendance	Record	Points	Recap
37^{[b]}	January 2	2–3	New York Rangers	Bobrovsky	46,967	22–11–4	48	L
38	January 5	5–4	Chicago Blackhawks	Bryzgalov	19,877	23–11–4	50	W
39	January 7	3–2 (OT)	Ottawa Senators	Bryzgalov	19,792	24–11–4	52	W
40	January 8	4–6	@ Ottawa Senators	Bryzgalov	20,028	24–12–4	52	L
41	January 10	2–1	@ Carolina Hurricanes	Bobrovsky	14,511	25–12–4	54	W
42	January 12	3–2	@ New York Islanders	Bobrovsky	11,751	26–12–4	56	W
43	January 14	2–4	@ Nashville Predators	Bryzgalov	17,113	26–13–4	56	L
44	January 17	5–1	Minnesota Wild	Bryzgalov	19,787	27–13–4	58	W
45	January 19	1–4	New York Islanders	Bobrovsky	19,796	27–14–4	58	L
46	January 21	4–1	@ New Jersey Devils	Bryzgalov	16,251	28–14–4	60	W
47	January 22	5–6 (SO)	Boston Bruins	Bryzgalov	19,851	28–14–5	61	OTL
48	January 24	3–2 (SO)	@ Florida Panthers	Bobrovsky	17,737	29–14–5	63	W
49	January 31	1–2 (SO)	Winnipeg Jets	Bryzgalov	19,874	29–14–6	64	OTL
Notes:^{b} 2012 NHL Winter Classic played at Citizens Bank Park in Philadelphia, Pennsylvania.

February: 5–7–1, 11 points (home: 3–3–1; road: 2–4–0)

Game	Date	Score	Opponent	Decision	Attendance	Record	Points	Recap
50	February 2	4–1	Nashville Predators	Bryzgalov	19,823	30–14–6	66	W
51	February 4	4–6	New Jersey Devils	Bobrovsky	19,862	30–15–6	66	L
52	February 5	2–5	@ New York Rangers	Bryzgalov	18,200	30–16–6	66	L
53	February 7	0–1 (SO)	New York Islanders	Bryzgalov	19,614	30–16–7	67	OTL
54	February 9	4–3	Toronto Maple Leafs	Bobrovsky	19,684	31–16–7	69	W
55	February 11	2–5	New York Rangers	Bobrovsky	19,915	31–17–7	69	L
56	February 12	3–4	@ Detroit Red Wings	Bobrovsky	20,066	31–18–7	69	L
57	February 16	7–2	Buffalo Sabres	Bryzgalov	19,725	32–18–7	71	W
58	February 18	4–6	Pittsburgh Penguins	Bobrovsky	19,958	32–19–7	71	L
59	February 21	5–4 (OT)	@ Winnipeg Jets	Bryzgalov	15,004	33–19–7	73	W
60	February 23	0–2	@ Edmonton Oilers	Bryzgalov	16,839	33–20–7	73	L
61	February 25	5–4 (SO)	@ Calgary Flames	Bryzgalov	19,289	34–20–7	75	W
62	February 28	0–1	@ San Jose Sharks	Bryzgalov	17,562	34–21–7	75	L

March: 11–3–2, 24 points (home: 7–2–1; road: 4–1–1)

Game	Date	Score	Opponent	Decision	Attendance	Record	Points	Recap
63	March 1	6–3	New York Islanders	Bryzgalov	19,674	35–21–7	77	W
64	March 4	1–0	@ Washington Capitals	Bryzgalov	18,506	36–21–7	79	W
65	March 6	3–2	Detroit Red Wings	Bryzgalov	19,892	37–21–7	81	W
66	March 8	5–0	Florida Panthers	Bryzgalov	19,675	38–21–7	83	W
67	March 10	1–0 (SO)	@ Toronto Maple Leafs	Bryzgalov	19,559	39–21–7	85	W
68	March 11	1–4	@ New Jersey Devils	Bobrovsky	15,107	39–22–7	85	L
69	March 13	3–0	New Jersey Devils	Bryzgalov	19,724	40–22–7	87	W
70	March 15	3–2	@ New York Islanders	Bryzgalov	13,827	41–22–7	89	W
71	March 17	2–3 (SO)	@ Boston Bruins	Bryzgalov	17,565	41–22–8	90	OTL
72	March 18	3–2 (OT)	Pittsburgh Penguins	Bryzgalov	19,927	42–22–8	92	W
73	March 20	1–2	Florida Panthers	Bryzgalov	19,568	42–23–8	92	L
74	March 22	2–1 (SO)	Washington Capitals	Bryzgalov	19,948	43–23–8	94	W
75	March 24	4–1	Montreal Canadiens	Bryzgalov	19,931	44–23–8	96	W
76	March 26	3–5	Tampa Bay Lightning	Bryzgalov	19,590	44–24–8	96	L
77	March 29	7–1	@ Toronto Maple Leafs	Bobrovsky	19,415	45–24–8	98	W
78	March 31	3–4 (SO)	Ottawa Senators	Bobrovsky	19,822	45–24–9	99	OTL

April: 2–2–0, 4 points (home: 1–1–0; road: 1–1–0)

Game	Date	Score	Opponent	Decision	Attendance	Record	Points	Recap
79	April 1	6–4	@ Pittsburgh Penguins	Bobrovsky	18,601	46–24–9	101	W
80	April 3	3–5	New York Rangers	Bryzgalov	19,898	46–25–9	101	L
81	April 5	2–1	Buffalo Sabres	Bryzgalov	19,873	47–25–9	103	W
82	April 7	2–4	@ Pittsburgh Penguins	Bobrovsky	18,616	47–26–9	103	L

Legend: W Win (2 points) L Loss (0 points) OTL Overtime/shootout loss (1 point)

=== Playoffs ===
2012 Stanley Cup playoffs
Eastern Conference quarterfinals vs. Pittsburgh Penguins – Flyers win 4–2

Game	Date	Score	Opponent	Decision	Attendance	Series	Recap
1	April 11	4–3 (OT)	@ Pittsburgh Penguins	Bryzgalov	18,565	Flyers lead 1–0	W
2	April 13	8–5	@ Pittsburgh Penguins	Bryzgalov	18,626	Flyers lead 2–0	W
3	April 15	8–4	Pittsburgh Penguins	Bryzgalov	20,092	Flyers lead 3–0	W
4	April 18	3–10	Pittsburgh Penguins	Bryzgalov	20,172	Flyers lead 3–1	L
5	April 20	2–3	@ Pittsburgh Penguins	Bryzgalov	18,628	Flyers lead 3–2	L
6	April 22	5–1	Pittsburgh Penguins	Bryzgalov	20,127	Flyers win 4–2	W

Eastern Conference semifinals vs. New Jersey Devils – Devils win 4–1

Game	Date	Score	Opponent	Decision	Attendance	Series	Recap
1	April 29	4–3 (OT)	New Jersey Devils	Bryzgalov	19,972	Flyers lead 1–0	W
2	May 1	1–4	New Jersey Devils	Bryzgalov	20,131	Series tied 1–1	L
3	May 3	3–4 (OT)	@ New Jersey Devils	Bryzgalov	17,625	Devils lead 2–1	L
4	May 6	2–4	@ New Jersey Devils	Bryzgalov	17,625	Devils lead 3–1	L
5	May 8	1–3	New Jersey Devils	Bryzgalov	19,818	Devils win 4–1	L

Legend: W Win L Loss

== Player statistics ==
=== Scoring ===
- Position abbreviations: C = Center; D = Defense; G = Goaltender; LW = Left wing; RW = Right wing
- † = Joined team via a transaction (e.g., trade, waivers, signing) during the season. Stats reflect time with the Flyers only.
- ‡ = Left team via a transaction (e.g., trade, waivers, release) during the season. Stats reflect time with the Flyers only.

No.	Player	Pos	Regular season						Playoffs					
No.	Player	Pos	GP	G	A	Pts	+/-	PIM	GP	G	A	Pts	+/-	PIM
28	Claude Giroux	C	77	28	65	93	6	29	10	8	9	17	2	13
19	Scott Hartnell	LW	82	37	30	67	19	136	11	3	5	8	−7	15
68	Jaromir Jagr	RW	73	19	35	54	5	30	11	1	7	8	−5	2
17	Wayne Simmonds	RW	82	28	21	49	−1	114	11	1	5	6	−6	38
93	Jakub Voracek	RW	78	18	31	49	11	32	11	2	8	10	0	8
48	Danny Briere	C	70	16	33	49	5	69	11	8	5	13	−6	4
24	Matt Read	RW	79	24	23	47	13	12	11	3	2	5	0	4
44	Kimmo Timonen	D	76	4	39	43	8	46	11	1	3	4	1	23
25	Matt Carle	D	82	4	34	38	4	36	11	2	4	6	−3	6
27	Maxime Talbot	C	81	19	15	34	5	59	11	4	2	6	5	10
14	Sean Couturier	C	77	13	14	27	18	14	11	3	1	4	2	2
41	Andrej Meszaros	D	62	7	18	25	6	38	1	0	0	0	0	0
21	James van Riemsdyk	LW	43	11	13	24	−1	24	7	1	1	2	−2	4
5	Braydon Coburn	D	81	4	20	24	10	56	11	0	4	4	0	8
10	Brayden Schenn	C	54	12	6	18	−7	34	11	3	6	9	−3	8
20	Chris Pronger	D	13	1	11	12	1	10	—	—	—	—	—	—
47	Eric Wellwood	LW	24	5	4	9	12	2	11	0	0	0	−1	2
36	Zac Rinaldo	C	66	2	7	9	−1	232	5	0	0	0	−2	48
43	Marc-Andre Bourdon	D	45	4	3	7	4	52	1	0	0	0	0	0
29	Harry Zolnierczyk	LW	37	3	3	6	−11	35	—	—	—	—	—	—
8	Nicklas Grossmann†	D	22	0	6	6	5	10	9	0	1	1	0	8
6	Andreas Lilja	D	46	0	6	6	9	34	10	0	0	0	−5	6
26	Erik Gustafsson	D	30	1	4	5	12	2	7	1	1	2	4	2
13	Pavel Kubina†	D	17	0	4	4	−3	15	5	0	1	1	−3	12
30	Ilya Bryzgalov	G	59	0	2	2		4	11	0	0	0		0
15	Andreas Nodl‡	RW	12	0	1	1	−1	2	—	—	—	—	—	—
32	Tom Sestito	LW	14	0	1	1	−3	83	—	—	—	—	—	—
45	Jody Shelley	LW	30	0	1	1	−6	64	—	—	—	—	—	—
35	Sergei Bobrovsky	G	29	0	0	0		0	1	0	0	0		0
22	Ben Holmstrom	C	5	0	0	0	0	2	—	—	—	—	—	—
23	Brandon Manning	D	4	0	0	0	1	0	—	—	—	—	—	—
46	Kevin Marshall‡	D	10	0	0	0	−1	8	—	—	—	—	—	—
8	Matt Walker	D	4	0	0	0	−2	16	—	—	—	—	—	—

=== Goaltending ===
No.	Player	Regular season											Playoffs									
No.	Player	GP	GS	W	L	OT	SA	GA	GAA	SV%	SO	TOI	GP	GS	W	L	SA	GA	GAA	SV%	SO	TOI
30	Ilya Bryzgalov	59	57	33	16	7	1554	141	2.48	.909	6	3,415	11	11	5	6	326	37	3.46	.887	0	642
35	Sergei Bobrovsky	29	25	14	10	2	769	78	3.02	.899	0	1,550	1	0	0	0	18	5	8.13	.722	0	37

== Awards and records ==
=== Awards ===
Type	Award/honor	Recipient	Ref
League (in-season)	NHL All-Star Game selection	Claude Giroux	
League (in-season)	NHL All-Star Game selection	Scott Hartnell	
League (in-season)	NHL All-Star Game selection	Kimmo Timonen	
League (in-season)	NHL First Star of the Month	Ilya Bryzgalov (March)	
League (in-season)	NHL First Star of the Week	Ilya Bryzgalov (March 12)	
League (in-season)	NHL First Star of the Week	Ilya Bryzgalov (March 19)	
League (in-season)	NHL First Star of the Week	Wayne Simmonds (April 2)	
League (in-season)	NHL Second Star of the Week	Scott Hartnell (January 23)	
League (in-season)	NHL Third Star of the Week	Jaromir Jagr (October 31)	
League (in-season)	NHL Third Star of the Week	Matt Read (November 21)	
Team	Barry Ashbee Trophy	Kimmo Timonen	
Team	Bobby Clarke Trophy	Claude Giroux	
Team	Gene Hart Memorial Award	Wayne Simmonds	
Team	Pelle Lindbergh Memorial Trophy	Scott Hartnell	
Team	Toyota Cup	Claude Giroux	
Team	Yanick Dupre Memorial Class Guy Award	Jaromir Jagr	

=== Records ===
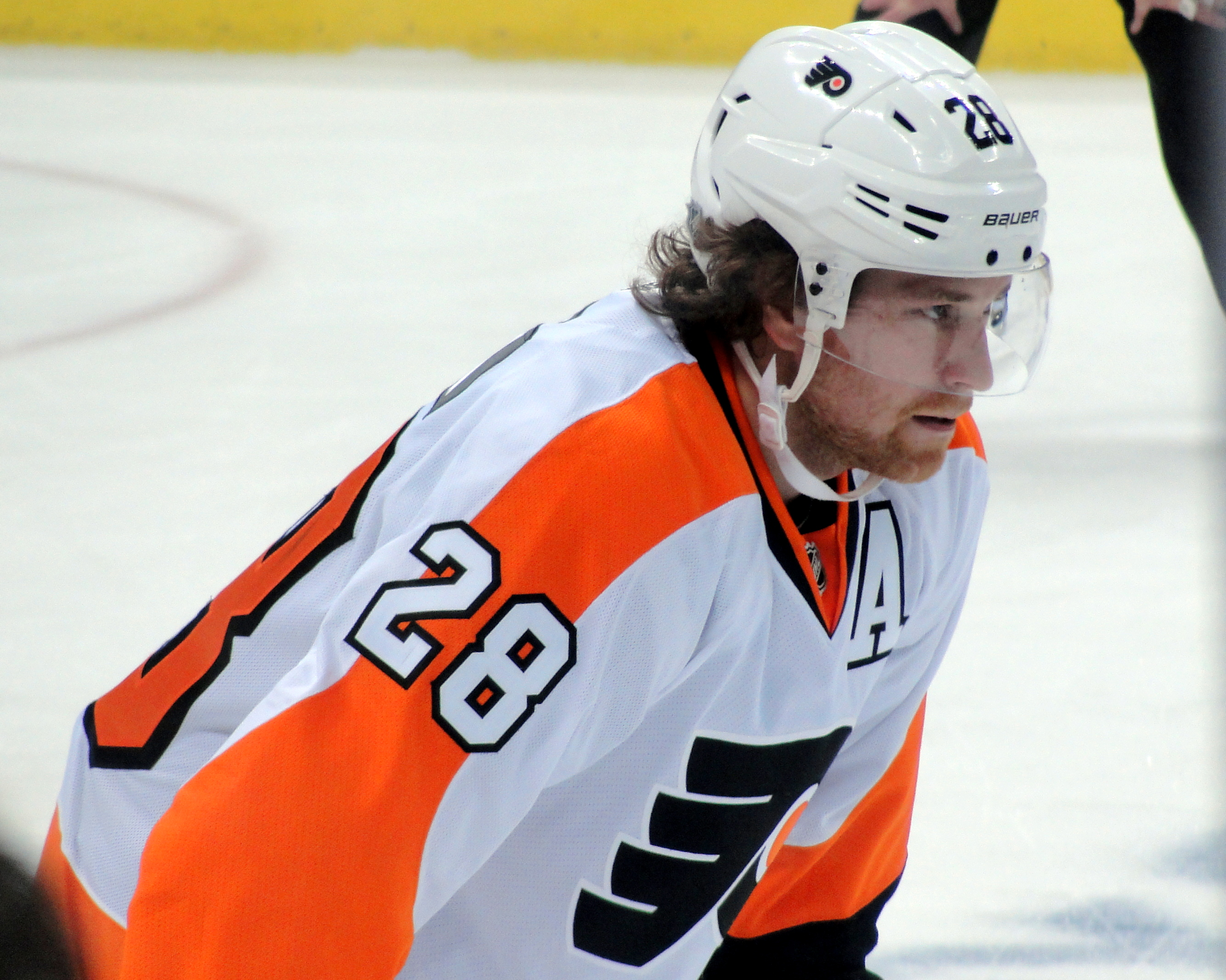
Claude Giroux, pictured here during game two of the Flyers' 2012 Eastern Conference quarterfinals series, set a team record for most points in a single playoff game.

Among the team records set during the 2011–12 season was Scott Hartnell tying the team record for most goals in a single period (3) on January 22. From March 6 to March 15, goaltender Ilya Bryzgalov set the team record for longest shutout sequence (249 minutes and 43 seconds) and his three consecutive shutouts from March 8 to March 13 tied the team record. On March 18, Hartnell scored the latest regular season overtime goal in team history at 4:59 of the period. The Flyers won 25 times on the road for the second consecutive season, tying the team record.

A number of franchise playoff records were set during the Flyers conference quarterfinals series against the Pittsburgh Penguins. In game two, Claude Giroux set a single playoff game team record for most points (6) and Sean Couturier tied one for most points by a rookie (4). The Flyers two shorthanded goals during the game also tied a team record. In game three, the Flyers scored four powerplay goals, tying a team record. During game four, the Flyers tied two team records for most powerplay goals scored during a single playoff period (3) and most goals allowed during a playoff game (10). The twelve powerplay goals the Flyers scored during the series is a franchise single series high.

=== Milestones ===
Milestone	Player	Date	Ref
First game	Sean Couturier	October 6, 2011	
First game	Matt Read	October 6, 2011	
First game	Harry Zolnierczyk	October 18, 2011	
First game	Marc-Andre Bourdon	November 21, 2011	
First game	Kevin Marshall	November 21, 2011	
First game	Brandon Manning	March 8, 2012	
1,600th point	Jaromir Jagr	October 6, 2011	
25th shutout	Ilya Bryzgalov	February 7, 2012	

== Transactions ==
The Flyers were involved in the following transactions from June 16, 2011, the day after the deciding game of the 2011 Stanley Cup Final, through June 11, 2012, the day of the deciding game of the 2012 Stanley Cup Final.

=== Trades ===
Date	Details		Ref
June 23, 2011	To Los Angeles Kings: Rob Bordson; Mike Richards	To Philadelphia Flyers: Brayden Schenn; Wayne Simmonds; 2nd-round pick in 2012	
June 23, 2011	To Columbus Blue Jackets: Jeff Carter	To Philadelphia Flyers: Jakub Voracek; 1st-round pick in 2011; 3rd-round pick in 2011	
June 27, 2011	To Minnesota Wild: Darroll Powe	To Philadelphia Flyers: 3rd-round pick in 2013	
July 1, 2011	To Florida Panthers: Kris Versteeg	To Philadelphia Flyers: 3rd-round pick in 2012; 2nd-round pick in 2012 or 2013 (Note: Florida elected to trade 2012 pick.)	
October 12, 2011	To Los Angeles Kings: Stefan Legein; 6th-round pick in 2012	To Philadelphia Flyers: Future considerations	
February 2, 2012	To Washington Capitals: Kevin Marshall	To Philadelphia Flyers: Matthew Ford	
February 16, 2012	To Dallas Stars: 2nd-round pick in 2012; 3rd-round pick in 2013	To Philadelphia Flyers: Nicklas Grossmann	
February 18, 2012	To Tampa Bay Lightning: Jon Kalinski; 2nd-round pick in 2012; 4th-round pick in 2013	To Philadelphia Flyers: Pavel Kubina	

=== Players acquired ===
Date	Player	Former team	Term	Via	Ref
July 1, 2011	Jaromir Jagr	Avangard Omsk (KHL)	1-year	Free agency	
July 1, 2011	Andreas Lilja	Anaheim Ducks	2-year	Free agency	
July 1, 2011	Maxime Talbot	Pittsburgh Penguins	5-year	Free agency	
July 19, 2011	Jason Bacashihua	Colorado Avalanche	1-year	Free agency	
September 14, 2011	Blake Kessel	University of New Hampshire (HE)	2-year	Free agency	
March 6, 2012	Cal Heeter	Ohio State University (CCHA)	2-year	Free agency	
April 2, 2012	Matt Konan	Medicine Hat Tigers (WHL)	3-year	Free agency	
April 2, 2012	Matt Mangene	University of Maine (HE)	2-year	Free agency	
May 21, 2012	Andrew Johnston	Humboldt Broncos (SJHL)	3-year	Free agency	

=== Players lost ===
Date	Player	New team	Via (Note: In parentheses is the player's free agency group on July 1 if applicable.)	Ref
July 1, 2011	Brian Boucher	Carolina Hurricanes	Free agency (III)	
July 1, 2011	Nick Boynton (Note: Boynton retired.)		Contract expiration (III)	
July 1, 2011	Daniel Carcillo	Chicago Blackhawks	Free agency (UFA)	
July 1, 2011	Ville Leino	Buffalo Sabres	Free agency (III)	
July 1, 2011	Sean O'Donnell	Chicago Blackhawks	Free agency (III)	
August 3, 2011	Garrett Klotz	Adirondack Phantoms (AHL)	Free agency (UFA)	
August 3, 2011	Nikolay Zherdev	Atlant Mytishchi (KHL)	Free agency (III)	
August 8, 2011	Danny Syvret	St. Louis Blues	Free agency (VI)	
August 9, 2011	Michael Ryan	Buffalo Sabres	Free agency (III)	
September 14, 2011	Joonas Lehtivuori	Modo Hockey (SHL) (Note: Lehtivuori signed with Modo on August 18, 2011.)	Release	
September 16, 2011	Brian Stewart	Binghamton Senators (AHL)	Free agency (UFA)	
October 5, 2011	Blair Betts	Montreal Canadiens	Waivers (Note: The waiver claim was reversed on October 9 after Betts failed his physical.)	
November 29, 2011	Andreas Nodl	Carolina Hurricanes	Waivers	

=== Signings ===
Date	Player	Term	Contract type	Ref
June 23, 2011	Ilya Bryzgalov	9-year	Re-signing	
June 27, 2011	Andreas Nodl	2-year	Re-signing	
June 27, 2011	Tom Sestito	1-year	Re-signing	
July 1, 2011	Jakub Voracek	1-year	Re-signing	
July 7, 2011	Wayne Simmonds	2-year	Re-signing	
July 14, 2011	Tye McGinn	3-year	Entry-level	
July 19, 2011	Jon Kalinski	1-year	Re-signing	
July 19, 2011	Marcel Noebels	3-year	Entry-level	
August 30, 2011	James van Riemsdyk	6-year	Extension	
September 21, 2011	Sean Couturier	3-year	Entry-level	
November 9, 2011	Braydon Coburn	4-year	Extension	
March 27, 2012	Nick Cousins	3-year	Entry-level	
April 4, 2012	Matthew Ford	1-year	Extension	
April 6, 2012	Nicklas Grossmann	4-year	Extension	
May 21, 2012	Derek Mathers	3-year	Entry-level	

== Draft picks ==
Philadelphia's picks at the 2011 NHL entry draft, which was held at the Xcel Energy Center in Saint Paul, Minnesota, on June 24–25, 2011. The Flyers traded their first-round pick, 25th overall, and their third-round pick, 85th overall, to the Toronto Maple Leafs for Kris Versteeg on February 14, 2011. They also traded their original second and fifth-round picks in two different trades.

Round	Pick	Player	Position	Nationality	Team (league)	Notes
1	8	Sean Couturier	Center	Canada	Drummondville Voltigeurs (QMJHL)	(Note: The Flyers traded Jeff Carter to the Columbus Blue Jackets for the Blue Jackets' first-round pick, eighth overall, the Blue Jackets' third-round pick, 68th overall, and Jakub Voracek on June 23, 2011.)
3	68	Nick Cousins	Center	Canada	Sault Ste. Marie Greyhounds (OHL)	
4	116	Colin Suellentrop	Defense	United States	Oshawa Generals (OHL)	
4	118	Marcel Noebels	Left wing	Germany	Seattle Thunderbirds (WHL)	(Note: The Flyers traded Simon Gagne to the Tampa Bay Lightning for the Lightning's fourth-round pick, 118th overall, and Matt Walker on July 19, 2010.)
6	176	Petr Placek	Right wing	Czech Republic	Hotchkiss School (USHS-CT)	
7	206	Derek Mathers	Right wing	Canada	Peterborough Petes (OHL)	

== Farm teams ==
American Hockey League – Adirondack Phantoms (Standings)
ECHL – Trenton Titans
