= Matt Bradley (ice hockey, born 1978) =

Canadian ice hockey player (born 1978)

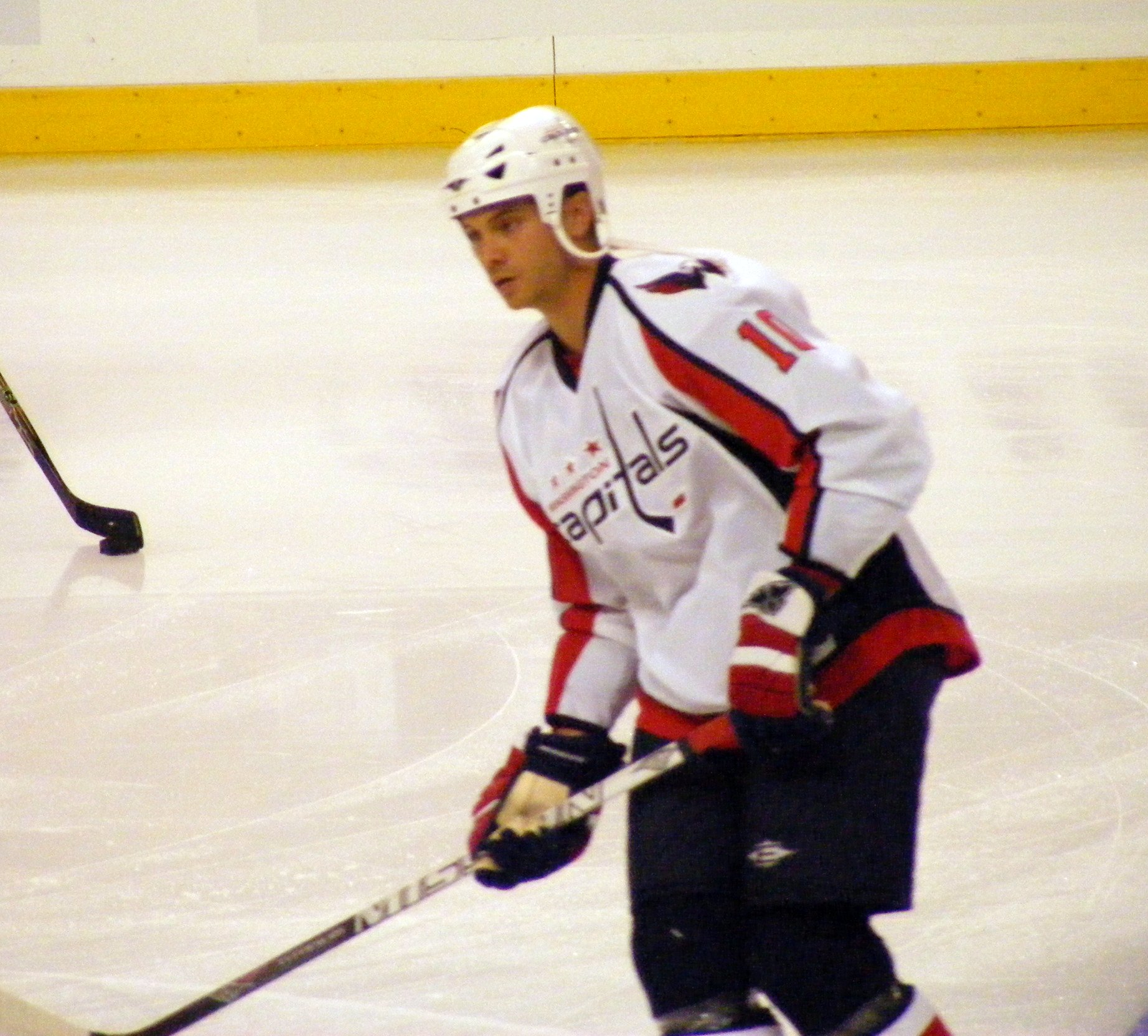
- Bradley with the Washington Capitals
- Born: June 13, 1978 (age 47) Stittsville, Ontario, Canada
- Height: 6 ft 3 in (191 cm)
- Weight: 205 lb (93 kg; 14 st 9 lb)
- Position: Winger
- Shot: Right
- Played for: San Jose Sharks; Pittsburgh Penguins; Washington Capitals; Florida Panthers
- NHL draft: 102nd overall, 1996; San Jose Sharks
- Playing career: 1997–2012

Matthew William Bradley (born June 13, 1978) is a Canadian professional ice hockey scout and former player who is a scout for the Washington Capitals of the National Hockey League (NHL). He played in the NHL for the San Jose Sharks, Pittsburgh Penguins, Washington Capitals and the Florida Panthers. He began working with the Washington Capitals as part of their scouting staff in 2015.

== Playing career ==
Bradley grew up in the Ottawa suburb of Stittsville, Ontario, and played most of his minor hockey for the local Stittsville Rams "C" teams as well as AA for the Ottawa Valley Titans of the ODHA.

After a solid Bantam season in 1993–94 with the Titans, Bradley was drafted and signed with the Cumberland Grads of the Central Junior Hockey League (CJHL). He spent the 1994–95 season with the Grads before being selected in the 2nd round (31st overall) of the 1995 OHL Priority Selection by the Kingston Frontenacs.

Bradley was drafted by the San Jose Sharks in the 1996 NHL Entry Draft, in the fourth round, 102nd overall. Prior to signing with the Washington Capitals, he also played for the Pittsburgh Penguins and San Jose Sharks.

Though he was not an offensive powerhouse, Bradley effectively carved out a niche for himself as a tough, checking line winger. In the 2007–08 season, Bradley doubled his fight total from the previous year, had a career-high 111 shots on goal, and was third among Capitals forwards in hits, even though he had the second lowest amount of ice time. Bradley improved his plus/minus rating in every season from 2003 to 2008.

Bradley was re-signed by the Capitals on May 27, 2008, to a three-year contract at $1,000,000 per season.

On July 3, 2011, Bradley signed a two-year, one-way contract with the Florida Panthers. In the 2011–12 season, Bradley appeared in only 45 games, his lowest since his rookie season, recording 8 points. With a limited role and dwindling future prospects in June 2012, the Panthers placed Bradley on waivers and subsequently bought out the remaining year on his contract.

With the 2012 NHL lockout in effect, and with limited interest, Bradley signed a month-by-month contract with Finnish second-division club TuTo Hockey on October 29, 2012. After just one game with TuTo, Bradley suffered another concussion and opted to end his agreement and return to Canada for rehabilitation on November 5, 2012.

== Career statistics ==
=== Regular season and playoffs ===
			Regular season					Playoffs
Season	Team	League	GP	G	A	Pts	PIM	GP	G	A	Pts	PIM
1993–94	Ottawa Valley Titans AAA	Bantam	32	26	22	48	46	—	—	—	—	—
1994–95	Cumberland Grads	CJHL	41	13	22	35	62	—	—	—	—	—
1995–96	Kingston Frontenacs	OHL	55	10	14	24	17	6	0	1	1	6
1996–97	Kingston Frontenacs	OHL	65	24	24	48	41	5	0	4	4	2
1996–97	Kentucky Thoroughblades	AHL	1	0	1	1	0	—	—	—	—	—
1997–98	Kingston Frontenacs	OHL	55	33	50	83	24	8	3	4	7	7
1998–99	Kentucky Thoroughblades	AHL	79	23	20	43	57	10	1	4	5	4
1999–2000	Kentucky Thoroughblades	AHL	80	22	19	41	81	9	6	3	9	9
2000–01	Kentucky Thoroughblades	AHL	22	5	8	13	16	1	1	0	1	5
2000–01	San Jose Sharks	NHL	21	1	1	2	19	—	—	—	—	—
2001–02	San Jose Sharks	NHL	54	9	13	22	43	10	0	0	0	0
2002–03	San Jose Sharks	NHL	46	2	3	5	37	—	—	—	—	—
2003–04	Pittsburgh Penguins	NHL	82	7	9	16	65	—	—	—	—	—
2004–05	Dornbirner EC	AUT.2	6	5	2	7	18	—	—	—	—	—
2005–06	Washington Capitals	NHL	74	7	12	19	72	—	—	—	—	—
2006–07	Washington Capitals	NHL	57	4	9	13	47	—	—	—	—	—
2007–08	Washington Capitals	NHL	77	7	11	18	74	7	0	2	2	2
2008–09	Washington Capitals	NHL	81	5	6	11	59	14	2	4	6	0
2009–10	Washington Capitals	NHL	77	10	14	24	47	7	1	2	3	2
2010–11	Washington Capitals	NHL	61	4	7	11	68	9	0	0	0	4
2011–12	Florida Panthers	NHL	45	3	5	8	31	—	—	—	—	—
2012–13	TuTo	Mestis	1	0	1	1	0	—	—	—	—	—
NHL totals			675	59	90	149	562	47	3	8	11	8

=== International ===
Year	Team	Event	Result	GP	G	A	Pts	PIM
1998	Canada	WJC	8th	7	1	1	2	4
Junior totals				7	1	1	2	4

== Awards and honours ==
Award	Year
OHL
William Hanley Trophy	1998
