= Nicklas Grossmann =

Swedish ice hockey player (born 1985)

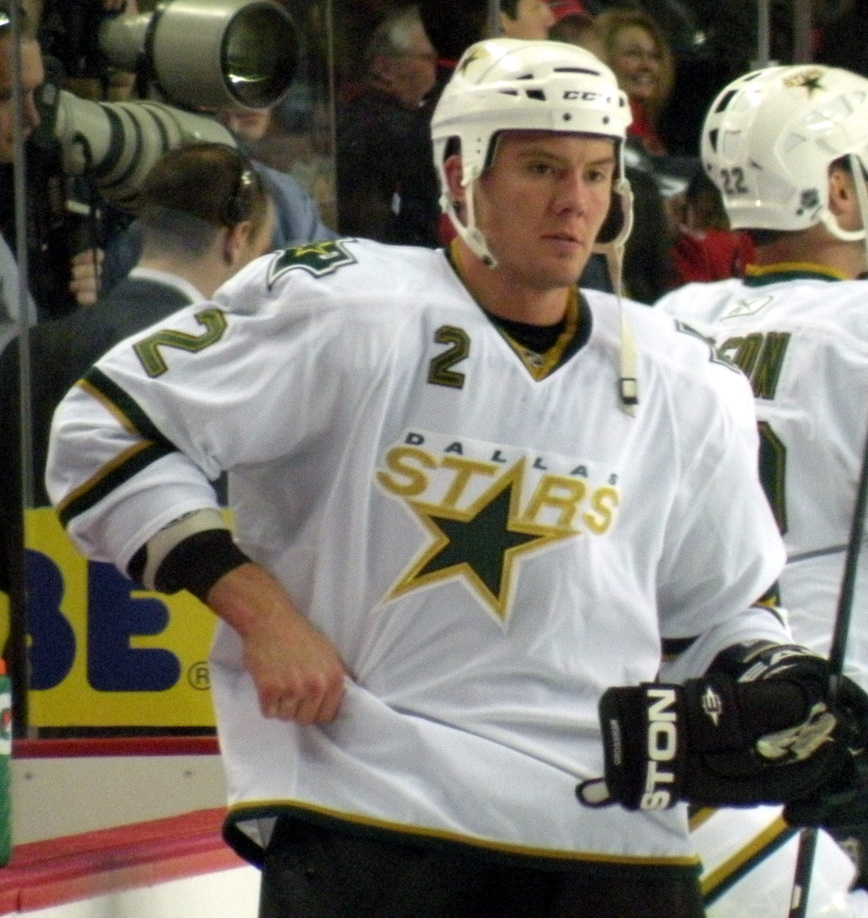
- Born: January 22, 1985 (age 41) Nacka, Sweden
- Height: 6 ft 4 in (193 cm)
- Weight: 231 lb (105 kg; 16 st 7 lb)
- Position: Defence
- Shot: Left
- Played for: Södertälje SK; Dallas Stars; Philadelphia Flyers; Arizona Coyotes; Calgary Flames; Örebro HK
- National team: Sweden
- NHL draft: 56th overall, 2004; Dallas Stars
- Playing career: 2003–2019

Nicklas Grossmann (born January 22, 1985) is a Swedish former professional ice hockey defenceman.

== Playing career ==
Grossmann's professional career began in the Swedish Elite League during the 2003–04 season with Södertälje SK. However, Grossmann only notched two career points in the SEL, both assists, over two seasons. He was drafted by the Dallas Stars in the 2004 NHL entry draft in the second round with the 56th overall pick.

Grossmann's professional debut in North America came on October 8, 2005, with Stars affiliate the Iowa Stars. It was then that Grossmann was converted to a regular defenceman, a move that led to his being named Iowa's Most Improved Player after his rookie season.

Grossmann scored his first career NHL goal in a Western Conference Finals game against the Detroit Red Wings on a power play. In May 2008, he was given a new two-year deal of about $2 million to stay with the Dallas Stars.

Grossmann was traded to the Philadelphia Flyers on February 16, 2012, in exchange for a 2012 second-round pick and a 2013 third-round pick.

Shortly after the trade on March 6, 2012, it was revealed that Grossmann had his name accidentally misspelled early in his pro career as "Grossman". He explained that he was young when the mistake was first made, and was so shy he never bothered to correct it. Thus all jerseys, trading cards, and rosters from his time in Elitserien with Södertälje SK and his NHL career with the Dallas Stars from the 2006–2012 seasons (as well as his first few games with the Flyers) have his name spelled incorrectly as "Grossman".

After four seasons with the Flyers, Grossmann was traded to the Arizona Coyotes along with the contract of Chris Pronger for Sam Gagner and a conditional draft pick on June 27, 2015. In the 2015–16 season with the Coyotes, Grossmann appeared in 53 games on the blueline, contributing with 3 goals and 7 points.

As an unsigned free agent over the following summer, Grossmann agreed to a professional try-out contract to attend the Calgary Flames pre-season. After a successful trial with the Flames, Grossmann signed a one-year deal on the eve of the 2016–17 season, on October 11, 2016. He struggled in 3 scoreless games with the Flames, before he was placed on waivers and assigned to the American Hockey League. With little interest to report to their affiliate in Stockton, Grossmann was again placed on waivers with the intention to terminate his contract with the Flames on November 12, 2016. Having returned to his native Sweden, Grossmann resumed playing after signing a contract for the remainder of the season with Örebro HK of the SHL on December 1, 2016.

As a free agent, Grossmann opted to return on a three-year contract to captain his original club, Södertälje SK of Allsvenskan, on August 2, 2017.

== Career statistics ==
=== Regular season and playoffs ===
			Regular season					Playoffs
Season	Team	League	GP	G	A	Pts	PIM	GP	G	A	Pts	PIM
2001–02	Södertälje SK	J20	1	0	0	0	0	—	—	—	—	—
2002–03	Södertälje SK	J18 Allsv	3	0	0	0	4	—	—	—	—	—
2002–03	Södertälje SK	J20	30	0	1	1	28	—	—	—	—	—
2003–04	Södertälje SK	J20	33	1	2	3	32	2	0	0	0	0
2003–04	Södertälje SK	SEL	1	0	0	0	0	—	—	—	—	—
2004–05	Södertälje SK	J20	12	3	6	9	8	1	0	0	0	0
2004–05	Södertälje SK	SEL	31	0	2	2	14	9	0	0	0	0
2005–06	Iowa Stars	AHL	61	2	3	5	49	7	0	1	1	4
2006–07	Iowa Stars	AHL	67	2	8	10	40	8	0	0	0	10
2006–07	Dallas Stars	NHL	8	0	0	0	4	—	—	—	—	—
2007–08	Dallas Stars	NHL	62	0	7	7	22	18	1	1	2	6
2007–08	Iowa Stars	AHL	10	0	0	0	10	—	—	—	—	—
2008–09	Dallas Stars	NHL	81	2	10	12	51	—	—	—	—	—
2009–10	Dallas Stars	NHL	71	0	7	7	32	—	—	—	—	—
2010–11	Dallas Stars	NHL	59	1	9	10	35	—	—	—	—	—
2011–12	Dallas Stars	NHL	52	0	5	5	26	—	—	—	—	—
2011–12	Philadelphia Flyers	NHL	22	0	6	6	10	9	0	1	1	8
2012–13	Södertälje SK	Allsv	4	0	1	1	4	—	—	—	—	—
2012–13	Philadelphia Flyers	NHL	30	1	3	4	21	—	—	—	—	—
2013–14	Philadelphia Flyers	NHL	78	1	13	14	55	4	0	0	0	2
2014–15	Philadelphia Flyers	NHL	68	5	9	14	32	—	—	—	—	—
2015–16	Arizona Coyotes	NHL	58	3	4	7	24	—	—	—	—	—
2016–17	Calgary Flames	NHL	3	0	0	0	2	—	—	—	—	—
2016–17	Örebro HK	SHL	28	0	2	2	10	—	—	—	—	—
2017–18	Södertälje SK	Allsv	45	2	3	5	44	5	0	1	1	2
2018–19	Södertälje SK	Allsv	28	3	5	8	22	—	—	—	—	—
NHL totals			592	13	73	86	314	31	1	2	3	16

=== International ===
Medal record

Representing Sweden

Ice hockey

World Championships
Silver medal – second place	2011 Kosice	
Bronze medal – third place	2009 Switzerland	

Year	Team	Event	GP	G	A	Pts	PIM
2005	Sweden	WJC	6	0	0	0	37
2009	Sweden	WC	9	0	1	1	4
2011	Sweden	WC	2	0	0	0	4
Junior totals			6	0	0	0	37
Senior totals			11	0	1	1	8
