= 2011–12 Winnipeg Jets season =

NHL franchise season

2011–12 Winnipeg Jets
- Division: 4th Southeast
- Conference: 11th Eastern
- 2011–12 record: 37–35–10
- Home record: 23–13–5
- Road record: 14–22–5
- Goals for: 235
- Goals against: 281

Team information
- General manager: Kevin Cheveldayoff
- Coach: Claude Noel
- Captain: Andrew Ladd
- Alternate captains: Dustin Byfuglien; Tobias Enstrom; Mark Stuart; Chris Thorburn
- Arena: MTS Centre
- Average attendance: 15,004 (100%); Total: 615,164

Team leaders
- Goals: Evander Kane (30)
- Assists: Blake Wheeler (47)
- Points: Blake Wheeler (64)
- Penalty minutes: Mark Stuart (98)
- Plus/minus: Evander Kane (+11)
- Wins: Ondrej Pavelec (29)
- Goals against average: Ondrej Pavelec (2.91)

The 2011–12 Winnipeg Jets season was the 29th season of play for the National Hockey League (NHL) franchise that was established on June 22, 1979, and 37th season for the organization overall. After 12 seasons as the Atlanta Thrashers, the franchise relocated back to Winnipeg and returned to their original identity following the conclusion of the 2010–11 NHL season. The relocation of the Thrashers to Winnipeg was confirmed by NHL Commissioner Gary Bettman on May 31, 2011, and approved by the NHL Board of Governors on June 21, 2011. At the end of the regular season, the team failed to qualify for the 2012 Stanley Cup playoffs.

As of 2026, this is now considered the 37th season overall of the Jets franchise after reacquiring the franchise records of the original Winnipeg Jets from the Arizona Coyotes.

== Off-season ==
On May 31, 2011, at a press conference at the MTS Centre, NHL Commissioner Gary Bettman confirmed that the Atlanta Thrashers had been sold to True North Sports and Entertainment and would relocate to Winnipeg for the 2011–12 NHL season after a unanimous vote favoring the sale and relocation at the Board of Governors meeting on June 21, 2011. On June 4, 2011, the new owners informed general manager Rick Dudley that he would no longer be general manager of the franchise, and that the last four years of his contract were to be bought-out.

On June 8, 2011, Winnipeg named Kevin Cheveldayoff as their new general manager, having previously been serving as the assistant general manager for the Chicago Blackhawks. Additionally, on June 20, 2011, new ownership informed Craig Ramsay that he was no longer the coach of the team. Former Edmonton Oilers head coach Craig MacTavish was also informed he was out of the running for the head coaching position. On June 24, True North announced that Claude Noel would be the first head coach of the new team in Winnipeg. Noel had spent the previous season as the head coach of the American Hockey League's Manitoba Moose.

The team's name was revealed to be the "Jets" at the 2011 NHL entry draft before the team made their selection. On August 15, Rick Rypien was found deceased at his home in Alberta. Rypien had signed a contract with the Jets in the off-season. He was 27 years old. The Jets unveiled their new jerseys at an event held on September 6 at 17 Wing in Winnipeg.

== Regular season ==
The Winnipeg team retained the Thrashers' place in the Southeast Division. The team played six games against its division opponents; four against other Eastern conference teams; and one or two games against Western conference teams.

== Standings ==
Southeast Division
Pos	Team	GP	W	L	OTL	ROW	GF	GA	GD	Pts
1	y – Florida Panthers	82	38	26	18	32	203	227	−24	94
2	x – Washington Capitals	82	42	32	8	38	222	230	−8	92
3	Tampa Bay Lightning	82	38	36	8	35	235	281	−46	84
4	Winnipeg Jets	82	37	35	10	33	225	246	−21	84
5	Carolina Hurricanes	82	33	33	16	32	213	243	−30	82

Source: National Hockey League
x – Clinched playoff spot; y – Clinched division

Eastern Conference
Pos	Div	Team	GP	W	L	OTL	ROW	GF	GA	GD	Pts
1	AT	z – New York Rangers	82	51	24	7	47	226	187	+39	109
2	NE	y – Boston Bruins	82	49	29	4	40	269	202	+67	102
3	SE	y – Florida Panthers	82	38	26	18	32	203	227	−24	94
4	AT	x – Pittsburgh Penguins	82	51	25	6	42	282	221	+61	108
5	AT	x – Philadelphia Flyers	82	47	26	9	43	264	232	+32	103
6	AT	x – New Jersey Devils	82	48	28	6	36	228	209	+19	102
7	SE	x – Washington Capitals	82	42	32	8	38	222	230	−8	92
8	NE	x – Ottawa Senators	82	41	31	10	35	249	240	+9	92
9	NE	Buffalo Sabres	82	39	32	11	32	218	230	−12	89
10	SE	Tampa Bay Lightning	82	38	36	8	35	235	281	−46	84
11	SE	Winnipeg Jets	82	37	35	10	33	225	246	−21	84
12	SE	Carolina Hurricanes	82	33	33	16	32	213	243	−30	82
13	NE	Toronto Maple Leafs	82	35	37	10	31	231	264	−33	80
14	AT	New York Islanders	82	34	37	11	27	203	255	−52	79
15	NE	Montreal Canadiens	82	31	35	16	26	212	226	−14	78

Source: National Hockey League
x – Clinched playoff spot; y – Clinched division; z – Clinched conference

== Schedule and results ==
=== Pre-season ===
2011 Pre–season record: 3–3–1 (Home: 3–0–1; Road: 0–3–0)

Game	Date	Opponent	Score	OT	Decision	Location	Attendance	Record
1	September 20	@ Columbus Blue Jackets (split-squad)	1–5		Chris Mason	Nationwide Arena	8,855	1–1–0
2	September 20	Columbus Blue Jackets (split-squad)	6–1		Ondrej Pavelec	MTS Centre	15,004	1–1–0
3	September 24	@ Nashville Predators	3–4		Chris Mason	Bridgestone Arena	14,701	1–2–0
4	September 25	@ Carolina Hurricanes	0–4		David Aebischer	Time Warner Cable Arena	N/A	1–3–0
5	September 26	@ Ottawa Senators	3–1		Ondrej Pavelec	Mile One Centre		2–3–0
6	September 28	Carolina Hurricanes	1–3			MTS Centre	15,004	3–3–0
7	September 30	Nashville Predators	3–2	SO		MTS Centre	15,004	3–3–1

=== Regular season ===
2011–12 Game log: 34–31–8, 76 points (Home: 23–11–4; Road: 11–20–4)
October: 4–6–1, 9 points (Home: 2–2–0; Road: 2–4–1)

Game	Date	Opponent	Score	OT	First Star	Decision	Location	Attendance	Record	Points
1	October 9	Montreal Canadiens	1–5		T. Plekanec	O. Pavelec	MTS Centre	15,004	0–1–0	0
2	October 13	@ Chicago Blackhawks	3–4		P. Kane	O. Pavelec	United Center	21,175	0–2–0	0
3	October 15	@ Phoenix Coyotes	1–4		O. Ekman-Larsson	C. Mason	Jobing.com Arena	17,132	0–3–0	0
4	October 17	Pittsburgh Penguins	2–1		O. Pavelec	O. Pavelec	MTS Centre	15,004	1–3–0	2
5	October 19	@ Toronto Maple Leafs	3–4	OT(SO)	J. Lupul	O. Pavelec	Air Canada Centre	19,514	1–3–1	3
6	October 20	@ Ottawa Senators	1–4		C. Anderson	O. Pavelec	Scotiabank Place	17,919	1–4–1	3
7	October 22	Carolina Hurricanes	5–3		C. Mason	C. Mason	MTS Centre	15,004	2–4–1	5
8	October 24	New York Rangers	1–2		M. Biron	C. Mason	MTS Centre	15,004	2–5–1	5
9	October 27	@ Philadelphia Flyers	9–8		N. Antropov	O. Pavelec	Wells Fargo Center	19,588	3–5–1	7
10	October 29	@ Tampa Bay Lightning	0–1		D. Roloson	O. Pavelec	St. Pete Times Forum	19,204	3–6–1	7
11	October 31	@ Florida Panthers	4–3	OT(SO)	A. Ladd	O. Pavelec	BankAtlantic Center	11,855	4–6–1	9

November: 5–5–3, 13 points (Home: 3–2–0; Road: 2–3–3)

Game	Date	Opponent	Score	OT	First Star	Decision	Location	Attendance	Record	Points
12	November 3	@ New York Islanders	3–0		O. Pavelec	O. Pavelec	Nassau Veterans Memorial Coliseum	10,157	5–6–1	11
13	November 5	@ New Jersey Devils	2–3	OT	A. Henrique	O. Pavelec	Prudential Center	14,952	5–6–2	12
14	November 6	@ New York Rangers	0–3		D. Stepan	O. Pavelec	Madison Square Garden	18,200	5–7–2	12
15	November 8	@ Buffalo Sabres	5–6	OT	J. Pominville	O. Pavelec	First Niagara Center	18,690	5–7–3	13
16	November 10	Florida Panthers	2–5		K. Versteeg	O. Pavelec	MTS Centre	15,004	5–8–3	13
17	November 12	@ Columbus Blue Jackets	1–2		R. Johansen	O. Pavelec	Nationwide Arena	15,581	5–9–3	13
18	November 14	Tampa Bay Lightning	5–2		D. Byfuglien	O. Pavelec	MTS Centre	15,004	6–9–3	15
19	November 17	Washington Capitals	4–1		E. Kane	O. Pavelec	MTS Centre	15,004	7–9–3	17
20	November 19	Philadelphia Flyers	6–4		D. Byfuglien	O. Pavelec	MTS Centre	15,004	8–9–3	19
21	November 23	@ Washington Capitals	3–4	OT	J. Chimera	O. Pavelec	Verizon Center	18,506	8–9–4	20
22	November 25	@ Carolina Hurricanes	3–1		A. Ladd	C. Mason	RBC Center	15,718	9–9–4	22
23	November 26	@ Boston Bruins	2–4		C. Kelly	O. Pavelec	TD Garden	17,565	9–10–4	22
24	November 29	Ottawa Senators	4–6		E. Kane	O. Pavelec	MTS Centre	15,004	9–11–4	22

December: 10–3–1, 21 points (Home: 9–2–1; Road: 1–1–0)

Game	Date	Opponent	Score	OT	First Star	Decision	Location	Attendance	Record	Points
25	December 1	Phoenix Coyotes	1–0		O. Pavelec	O. Pavelec	MTS Centre	15,004	10–11–4	24
26	December 3	New Jersey Devils	4–2		E. Kane	O. Pavelec	MTS Centre	15,004	11–11–4	26
27	December 6	Boston Bruins	2–1		O. Pavelec	O. Pavelec	MTS Centre	15,004	12–11–4	28
28	December 9	Carolina Hurricanes	4–2		B. Wheeler	C. Mason	MTS Centre	15,004	13–11–4	30
29	December 10	@ Detroit Red Wings	1–7		V. Filppula	O. Pavelec	Joe Louis Arena	20,066	13–12–4	30
30	December 13	Minnesota Wild	2–1		O. Pavelec	O. Pavelec	MTS Centre	15,004	14–12–4	32
31	December 15	Washington Capitals	0–1		M. Neuvirth	O. Pavelec	MTS Centre	15,004	14–13–4	32
32	December 17	Anaheim Ducks	5–3		Z. Bogosian	C. Mason	MTS Centre	15,004	15–13–4	34
33	December 20	New York Islanders	2–3	OT(SO)	N. Antropov	O. Pavelec	MTS Centre	15,004	15–13–5	35
34	December 22	Montreal Canadiens	4–0		B. Wheeler	O. Pavelec	MTS Centre	15,004	16–13–5	37
35	December 23	Pittsburgh Penguins	1–4		C. Kunitz	O. Pavelec	MTS Centre	15,004	16–14–5	37
36	December 27	@ Colorado Avalanche	4–1		E. Kane	O. Pavelec	Pepsi Center	18,007	17–14–5	39
37	December 29	Los Angeles Kings	1–0	OT	C. Mason	C. Mason	MTS Centre	15,004	18–14–5	41
38	December 31	Toronto Maple Leafs	3–2		B. Wheeler	O. Pavelec	MTS Centre	15,004	19–14–5	43

January: 4–8–1, 9 points (Home: 1–2–1; Road: 3–6–0)

Game	Date	Opponent	Score	OT	First Star	Decision	Location	Attendance	Record	Points
39	January 4	@ Montreal Canadiens	3–7		L. Eller	O. Pavelec	Bell Centre	21,273	19–15–5	43
40	January 5	@ Toronto Maple Leafs	0–4		J. Gustavsson	C. Mason	Air Canada Centre	19,514	19–16–5	43
41	January 7	@ Buffalo Sabres	2–1	OT	J. Oduya	O. Pavelec	First Niagara Center	18,690	20–16–5	45
42	January 10	@ Boston Bruins	3–5		N. Horton	O. Pavelec	TD Garden	17,565	20–17–5	45
43	January 12	San Jose Sharks	0–2		Couture	O. Pavelec	MTS Centre	15,004	20–18–5	45
44	January 14	New Jersey Devils	1–2		P. Elias	O. Pavelec	MTS Centre	15,004	20–19–5	45
45	January 16	@ Ottawa Senators	2–0		T. Enstrom	C. Mason	Scotiabank Place	19,927	21–19–5	47
46	January 17	@ New Jersey Devils	1–5		I. Kovalchuk	C. Mason	Prudential Center	14,129	21–20–5	47
47	January 19	Buffalo Sabres	4–1		T. Enstrom	O. Pavelec	MTS Centre	15,004	22–20–5	49
48	January 21	Florida Panthers	3–4	SO	K. Versteeg	O. Pavelec	MTS Centre	15,004	22–20–6	50
49	January 23	@ Carolina Hurricanes	1–2		C. Ward	C. Mason	RBC Center	16,045	22–21–6	50
50	January 24	@ New York Rangers	0–3		H. Lundqvist	O. Pavelec	Madison Square Garden	18,200	22–22–6	50
51	January 31	@ Philadelphia Flyers	2–1	SO	B. Little	O. Pavelec	Wells Fargo Center	19,874	23–22–6	52

February: 7–5–2, 16 points (Home: 4–2–2; Road: 3–3–0)

Game	Date	Opponent	Score	OT	First Star	Decision	Location	Attendance	Record	Points
52	February 2	@ Tampa Bay Lightning	2–1	OT	K. Wellwood	O. Pavelec	St. Pete Times Forum	16,923	24–22–6	54
53	February 3	@ Florida Panthers	1–2		K. Versteeg	C. Mason	BankAtlantic Center	16,773	24–23–6	54
54	February 5	@ Montreal Canadiens	0–3		C. Price	O. Pavelec	Bell Centre	21,273	24–24–6	54
55	February 7	Toronto Maple Leafs	2–1		B. Wheeler	O. Pavelec	MTS Centre	15,004	25–24–6	56
56	February 9	@ Washington Capitals	3–2	SO	A. Ovechkin	O. Pavelec	Verizon Center	18,506	26–24–6	58
57	February 10	@ Pittsburgh Penguins	5–8		E. Malkin	O. Pavelec	Consol Energy Center	18,602	26–25–7	58
58	February 14	New York Islanders	1–3		P. Parenteau	O. Pavelec	MTS Centre	15,004	26–26–6	58
59	February 16	@ Minnesota Wild	4–3	SO	E. Kane	C. Mason	Xcel Energy Center	19,060	27–26–6	60
60	February 17	Boston Bruins	4–2		B. Wheeler	O. Pavelec	MTS Centre	15,004	28–26–6	62
61	February 19	Colorado Avalanche	5–1		B. Wheeler	O. Pavelec	MTS Centre	15,004	29–26–6	64
62	February 21	Philadelphia Flyers	5–4	OT	O. Pavelec	O. Pavelec	MTS Centre	15,004	29–26–7	65
63	February 23	Tampa Bay Lightning	4–3		A. Ladd	O. Pavelec	MTS Centre	15,004	30–26–7	67
64	February 25	St. Louis Blues	2–3	SO	B. Wheeler	C. Mason	MTS Centre	15,004	30–26–8	68
65	February 27	Edmonton Oilers	3–5		T. Hall	O. Pavelec	MTS Centre	15,004	30–27–8	68

March: 6–7–1, 8 points (Home: 4–3–0; Road: 2–4–1)

Game	Date	Opponent	Score	OT	First Star	Decision	Location	Attendance	Record	Points
66	March 1	Florida Panthers	7–0		E. Kane	O. Pavelec	MTS Centre	15,004	31–27–8	70
67	March 5	Buffalo Sabres	3–1		B. Little	O. Pavelec	MTS Centre	15,004	32–27–8	72
68	March 8	@ Vancouver Canucks	2–3		R. Kesler	O. Pavelec	Rogers Arena	18,890	32–28–8	72
69	March 9	@ Calgary Flames	3–5		A. Tanguay	O. Pavelec	Scotiabank Saddledome	19,289	32–29–8	72
70	March 14	Dallas Stars	5–2		A. Ladd	O. Pavelec	MTS Centre	15,004	33–29–8	74
71	March 16	Washington Capitals	3–2		D. Byfuglien	O. Pavelec	MTS Centre	15,004	34–29–8	76
72	March 18	Carolina Hurricanes	3–4		A. Miettien	O. Pavelec	MTS Centre	15,004	34–30–8	76
73	March 20	@ Pittsburgh Penguins	4–8		J. Neal	O. Pavelec	Consol Energy Center	18,589	34–31–8	76
74	March 23	@ Washington Capitals	4–3	OT	A. Ovechkin	O. Pavelec	Verizon Center	18,506	35–31–8	78
75	March 24	@ Nashville Predators	1–3		P. Rinne	O. Pavelec	Bridgestone Arena	17,113	35–32–8	78
76	March 26	Ottawa Senators	4–6		E. Karlsson	O. Pavelec	MTS Centre	15,004	35–33–8	78
77	March 28	New York Rangers	2–4		M. Del Zotto	O. Pavelec	MTS Centre	15,004	35–34–8	78
78	March 30	@ Carolina Hurricanes	4–3	OT	A. Ladd	C. Mason	RBC Center	18,680	36–34–8	80
79	March 31	@ Tampa Bay Lightning	2–3	OT	R. Malone	O. Pavelec	St. Pete Times Forum	19,204	36–34–9	81

April: 1–1–1, 3 points (Home: 0–0–1; Road: 1–1–0)

Game	Date	Opponent	Score	OT	First Star	Decision	Location	Attendance	Record	Points
80	April 3	@ Florida Panthers	5–4	OT	A. Ladd	O. Pavelec	BankAtlantic Center	17,760	37–34–9	83
81	April 5	@ New York Islanders	4–5		M. Grabner	C. Mason	Nassau Veterans Memorial Coliseum	13,048	37–35–9	83
82	April 7	Tampa Bay Lightning	3–4	OT	T. Purcell	O. Pavelec	MTS Centre	15,004	37–35–10	84

2011–12 schedule
Jets score listed first;

Win (2 points) Loss (0 points) Overtime/shootout loss (1 point)

== Player statistics ==
=== Skaters ===
Note: Pos = Position; GP = Games played; G = Goals; A = Assists; Pts = Points; PIM = Penalty minutes; +/- = Plus/minus; PPG = Power-play goals; SHG = Short-handed goals; GWG = Game-winning goals

Regular season

Player	GP	G	A	Pts	+/−	PIM
Blake Wheeler	80	17	47	64	3	55
Evander Kane	74	30	27	57	11	53
Dustin Byfuglien	66	12	41	53	−8	72
Andrew Ladd	82	28	22	50	−8	64
Kyle Wellwood	77	18	29	47	3	4
Bryan Little	74	24	22	46	−11	26
Nik Antropov	69	15	20	35	0	42
Tobias Enstrom	62	6	27	33	6	38
Zach Bogosian	65	5	25	30	−3	71
Alexander Burmistrov	76	13	15	28	4	42
Tim Stapleton	63	11	16	27	−2	10
Jim Slater	78	13	8	21	−9	42
Tanner Glass	78	5	11	16	−12	73
Mark Stuart	80	3	11	14	−4	98
Antti Miettinen	45	5	8	13	−5	0
Johnny Oduya^{‡}	63	2	11	13	−9	33
Chris Thorburn	72	4	7	11	−6	83
Ron Hainsey	56	0	10	10	9	23
Spencer Machacek	13	2	7	9	8	7
Mark Flood	33	3	4	7	−1	10
Ben Maxwell^{‡†}	9	1	4	5	3	0
Eric Fehr	35	2	1	3	−6	12
Grant Clitsome^{†}	12	0	3	3	−3	8
Randy Jones	39	1	1	2	4	8
Brett MacLean^{‡}	5	0	2	2	1	2
Jason Jaffray	13	0	1	1	−1	7
Mark Scheifele	7	1	0	1	0	0
Derek Meech	2	0	0	0	1	4
Aaron Gagnon	7	0	0	0	−1	0
Kenndal McArdle	9	0	0	0	−3	4
Brett Festerling	5	0	0	0	−1	2
Arturs Kulda	9	0	0	0	3	4
Paul Postma	3	0	0	0	0	0
Patrice Cormier	9	0	0	0	1	0
Carl Klingberg	6	0	0	0	−1	4

=== Goaltenders ===
Note: GP = Games played; Min = Minutes played; W = Wins; L = Losses; OT = Overtime losses; GA = Goals against; GAA= Goals against average; SA= Shots against; SV= Saves; Sv% = Save percentage; SO= Shutouts

Regular season

Player	GP	Min	W	L	OT	GA	GAA	SA	Sv%	SO	G	A	PIM
Ondrej Pavelec	68	3932	29	28	9	191	2.91	2036	.906%	4	0	2	0
Chris Mason	20	995	8	7	1	43	2.59	422	.898%	2	0	0	0
Peter Mannino	1	20	0	0	0	0	0.00	4	1.000%	0	0	0	0

^{†}Denotes player spent time with another team before joining Jets. Stats reflect time with the Jets only.
^{‡}Traded mid-season
underline/italics denotes franchise record

== Awards and records ==
=== Awards ===
Regular season
Player	Award	Awarded
Blake Wheeler	NHL Second Star of the Week	February 20, 2012

=== Milestones ===
Regular season
Player	Milestone	Reached
Zach Bogosian	200th career NHL game	October 9, 2011
Mark Scheifele	1st career NHL game	October 9, 2011
Mark Scheifele	1st career NHL goal 1st career NHL point	October 19, 2011
Mark Flood	1st career NHL goal	November 5, 2011
Johnny Oduya	100th career NHL point	November 8, 2011
Tanner Glass	200th career NHL game	November 10, 2011
Bryan Little	300th career NHL game	November 14, 2011
Johnny Oduya	400th career NHL game	November 17, 2011
Andrew Ladd	100th career NHL goal	November 25, 2011
Nik Antropov	700th career NHL game	November 26, 2011
Alexander Burmistrov	100th career NHL game	December 3, 2011
Dustin Byfuglien	100th career NHL assist	December 3, 2011
Kyle Wellwood	400th career NHL game	December 6, 2011
Jim Slater	400th career NHL game	December 17, 2011
Ron Hainsey	500th career NHL game	December 29, 2011
Evander Kane	100th career NHL point	January 7, 2012
Chris Thorburn	400th career NHL game	January 21, 2012
Kyle Wellwood	200th career NHL point	January 21, 2012
Chris Mason	300th career NHL game	January 23, 2012
Blake Wheeler	300th career NHL game	February 14, 2012
Blake Wheeler	100th career NHL assist	February 17, 2012
Dustin Byfuglien	200th career NHL point	February 23, 2012
Antti Miettinen	500th career NHL game	February 25, 2012
Tim Stapleton	100th career NHL game	February 25, 2012
Evander Kane	200th career NHL game	March 9, 2012
Bryan Little	100th career NHL assist	March 9, 2012
Spencer Machacek	1st career NHL assist 1st career NHL point	March 18, 2012
Tobias Enstrom	200th career NHL point	March 20, 2012
Spencer Machacek	1st career NHL goal	March 23, 2012
Dustin Byfuglien	400th career NHL game	March 24, 2012
Grant Clitsome	100th career NHL game	March 28, 2012

=== Records ===
Player	Record (Amount)	Achieved

== Transactions ==
Winnipeg has been involved in the following transactions during the 2011–12 season.

=== Trades ===
Date	Details
June 25, 2011	To Montreal Canadiens 4th-round pick in 2011; 4th-round pick in 2011	To Winnipeg Jets 3rd-round pick in 2011
June 25, 2011	To San Jose Sharks 5th-round pick in 2011; 7th-round pick in 2011	To Winnipeg Jets 4th-round pick in 2011
July 8, 2011	To Washington Capitals Danick Paquette; 4th-round pick in 2012	To Winnipeg Jets Eric Fehr
July 9, 2011	To Florida Panthers Angelo Esposito	To Winnipeg Jets Kenndal McArdle
January 30, 2012	To Calgary Flames Akim Aliu	To Winnipeg Jets John Negrin
February 13, 2012	To Anaheim Ducks Riley Holzapfel	To Winnipeg Jets Maxime Macenauer
February 27, 2012	To Chicago Blackhawks Johnny Oduya	To Winnipeg Jets 2nd-round pick in 2013; 3rd-round pick in 2013

=== Free agents signed ===
Player	Former team	Contract terms
Derek Meech	Detroit Red Wings	1 year, $700,000
Tanner Glass	Vancouver Canucks	1 year, $750,000
Aaron Gagnon	Dallas Stars	2 years, $1.125 million
Mark Flood	Manitoba Moose	1 year, $525,000
Rick Rypien	Vancouver Canucks	1 year, $700,000
Randy Jones	Tampa Bay Lightning	1 year, $1.15 million
Jason Gregoire	University of North Dakota	2 years, $1.85 million entry-level contract
Jason Jaffray	Manitoba Moose	1 year, $675,000
Kyle Wellwood	San Jose Sharks	1 year, $700,000

=== Free agents lost ===
Player	New team	Contract terms
Andrei Zubarev	Atlant Moscow Oblast	Undisclosed
Jaime Sifers	Adler Mannheim	1 year
Jason Krog	HV71	1 year
Noah Welch	HV71	1 year
Radek Dvorak	Dallas Stars	1 year, $1.5 million
Anthony Stewart	Carolina Hurricanes	2 years, $3.6 million
Fredrik Pettersson	Frolunda HC	4 years
Eric Boulton	New Jersey Devils	2 years, $1.325 million
Rob Schremp	Modo Hockey	1 year

=== Claimed via waivers ===
Player	Former team	Date claimed off waivers
Brett MacLean	Phoenix Coyotes	October 6, 2011
Ben Maxwell	Anaheim Ducks	December 6, 2011
Antti Miettinen	Tampa Bay Lightning	December 13, 2011
Grant Clitsome	Columbus Blue Jackets	February 27, 2012

=== Lost via waivers ===
Player	New team	Date claimed off waivers
Brett MacLean	Winnipeg Jets	October 29, 2011
Ben Maxwell	Anaheim Ducks	November 10, 2011

=== Lost via retirement ===
Player

=== Player signings ===
Player	Date	Contract terms
Cody Sol	June 2, 2011	3 years, $1.735 million entry-level contract
Andrew Ladd	July 5, 2011	5 years, $22 million
Blake Wheeler	July 18, 2011	2 years, $5.1 million
Brett Festerling	July 18, 2011	1 year, $577,500
Riley Holzapfel	July 18, 2011	1 year, $575,000
Arturs Kulda	July 18, 2011	1 year, $575,000
Spencer Machacek	July 18, 2011	1 year, $575,000
Ben Maxwell	July 18, 2011	1 year, $715,000
Kenndal McArdle	July 18, 2011	1 year, $600,000
Ivan Telegin	July 26, 2011	3 years, $1.875 million entry-level contract
Zach Bogosian	September 14, 2011	2 years, $5 million
Mark Scheifele	October 3, 2011	3 years, $2.775 million entry-level contract
Julian Melchiori	March 16, 2012	3 years, $1.875 million entry-level contract
Will O'Neill	March 27, 2012	1 year, $550,000 entry-level contract

== Draft picks ==
Winnipeg's picks at the 2011 NHL entry draft in St. Paul, Minnesota.

Round	Overall	Player	Position	Nationality	College/Junior/Club team (League)
1	7	Mark Scheifele	C	Canada	Barrie Colts (OHL)
3	67	Adam Lowry	LW	Canada	Swift Current Broncos (WHL)
3	78 (from Montreal)	Brennan Serville	D	Canada	Stouffville Spirit (OJHL)
4	119 (from San Jose)	Zach Yuen	D	Canada	Tri-City Americans (WHL)
5	149 (from San Jose)	Austen Brassard	RW	Canada	Belleville Bulls (OHL)
6	157	Jason Kasdorf	G	Canada	Portage Terriers (MJHL)
7	187	Aaron Harstad	D	United States	Green Bay Gamblers (USHL)

== See also ==
- 2011–12 NHL season
