= 2011–12 Tampa Bay Lightning season =

National Hockey League team season

2011–12 Tampa Bay Lightning
- Division: 3rd Southeast
- Conference: 10th Eastern
- 2011–12 record: 38–36–8
- Home record: 25–14–2
- Road record: 13–22–6
- Goals for: 235
- Goals against: 281

Team information
- General manager: Steve Yzerman
- Coach: Guy Boucher
- Captain: Vincent Lecavalier
- Alternate captains: Mattias Ohlund; Martin St. Louis; Steven Stamkos
- Arena: Tampa Bay Times Forum (Note: Renamed from St. Pete Times Forum on January 1, 2012.)
- Average attendance: 18,468 (96.2%)

Team leaders
- Goals: Steven Stamkos (60)
- Assists: Martin St. Louis (49)
- Points: Steven Stamkos (97)
- Penalty minutes: Steve Downie (121)
- Plus/minus: Teddy Purcell (+9)
- Wins: Mathieu Garon (23)
- Goals against average: Mathieu Garon (2.85)

The 2011–12 Tampa Bay Lightning season was the franchise's 20th season in the National Hockey League (NHL). To commemorate their 20th anniversary, the Lightning had a brand new logo and jerseys beginning this season.

On April 7, 2012, during the last day of the NHL season, Tampa Bay Lightning forward Steve Stamkos scored his 60th goal in a 4–3 overtime victory against the Winnipeg Jets. This accomplishment made him the 20th player in NHL history to achieve the milestone of scoring 60 goals in a single season, and the first player to do so since Alexander Ovechkin in the 2007-08 season. In addition, Stamkos also holds the distinction of being the only NHL player to have scored 60 or more goals in a single NHL season during the 2010s, placing him among a distinguished group of NHL players who have achieved this rare feat in the salary cap era following the 2004–05 NHL lockout. Adding to his 60 goals, Stamkos recorded 37 assists for 97 points and played in all 82 games for the third consecutive season. Moreover, his 97 points ranked second in the NHL as the runner up for the Art Ross Trophy, 12 behind Evgeni Malkin of the Pittsburgh Penguins, who (along with New York Rangers goaltender Henrik Lundqvist) were named the NHL's three finalists for the Hart Memorial Trophy which was eventually awarded to Malkin. Stamkos was also named as a finalist for the Ted Lindsay Award for the second straight season (which also went to Malkin) and his 60 goals led to him being awarded his second Rocket Richard Trophy. Despite Stamkos' individual accomplishments, the Lightning struggled as a team, finishing the season eight points out of a spot for the 2012 playoffs and missed the playoffs for the first time since the 2009–10 season and at tenth overall in the Eastern Conference.

== Off-season ==
Among the Lightning's offseason deals, they re-signed their first overall pick from 2008, Steven Stamkos, to a five-year contract. They also brought back goaltender Dwayne Roloson with a one-year contract, having acquired him in a trade during the previous season.

The team's home arena, the St. Pete Times Forum, underwent a $35 million renovation that saw additions that included a digital pipe organ and Tesla coils on either side of the main scoreboard that shoot lightning 25 feet.

== Regular season ==
The Lightning opened the season on the road against the Carolina Hurricanes on October 7. Their first home game was October 17 against the Florida Panthers.

In October, the Lightning earned 12 points after going 5–4–2, which put them in eighth place in the Eastern Conference, and third place in the Southeast Division. Steven Stamkos led the team in goals with six, while Marc-Andre Bergeron led the team in points with 12.

Victor Hedman, the second-overall pick in the 2009 NHL entry draft, was signed to a five-year contract extension worth $20 million.

As in October, the Lightning earned 12 points in November with a 6–7–0 record for the month, making their overall record 11–11–2. They remained in third place in their division, while falling to 11th in the Eastern Conference. Stamkos continued to lead the team in goals with 16, and also overtook the points lead with 26.

Martin St. Louis was injured during a morning practice on December 8. That night he was expected to play in his 500th consecutive game. St. Louis took a puck to the face from a backhanded shot attempt from a teammate. After being evaluated, St. Louis was reported to have suffered facial and nasal fractures, and was ruled to be out indefinitely. He would return to the ice on December 21, sporting a full metal cage attached his helmet.

The Lightning began December with only one win in six games, but rebounded to earn points in six of the last seven games of the month, giving them a 6–6–1 record in December. Their 17–17–3 record dropped them to 4th in the division and 12th in the conference. Stamkos ended the month with 43 points, and his 26 goals not only led the team, but led the entire league.

The Lightning concluded the regular season having allowed 278 goals (excluding three shootout goals), the most in the League. They also tied the Detroit Red Wings for the fewest shorthanded goals scored, with just two.

== Playoffs ==
The Lightning failed to qualify for the 2012 Stanley Cup playoffs.

== Standings ==
=== Divisional standings ===
Southeast Division
Pos	Team	GP	W	L	OTL	ROW	GF	GA	GD	Pts
1	y – Florida Panthers	82	38	26	18	32	203	227	−24	94
2	x – Washington Capitals	82	42	32	8	38	222	230	−8	92
3	Tampa Bay Lightning	82	38	36	8	35	235	281	−46	84
4	Winnipeg Jets	82	37	35	10	33	225	246	−21	84
5	Carolina Hurricanes	82	33	33	16	32	213	243	−30	82

Source: National Hockey League
x – Clinched playoff spot; y – Clinched division

=== Conference standings ===
Eastern Conference
Pos	Div	Team	GP	W	L	OTL	ROW	GF	GA	GD	Pts
1	AT	z – New York Rangers	82	51	24	7	47	226	187	+39	109
2	NE	y – Boston Bruins	82	49	29	4	40	269	202	+67	102
3	SE	y – Florida Panthers	82	38	26	18	32	203	227	−24	94
4	AT	x – Pittsburgh Penguins	82	51	25	6	42	282	221	+61	108
5	AT	x – Philadelphia Flyers	82	47	26	9	43	264	232	+32	103
6	AT	x – New Jersey Devils	82	48	28	6	36	228	209	+19	102
7	SE	x – Washington Capitals	82	42	32	8	38	222	230	−8	92
8	NE	x – Ottawa Senators	82	41	31	10	35	249	240	+9	92
9	NE	Buffalo Sabres	82	39	32	11	32	218	230	−12	89
10	SE	Tampa Bay Lightning	82	38	36	8	35	235	281	−46	84
11	SE	Winnipeg Jets	82	37	35	10	33	225	246	−21	84
12	SE	Carolina Hurricanes	82	33	33	16	32	213	243	−30	82
13	NE	Toronto Maple Leafs	82	35	37	10	31	231	264	−33	80
14	AT	New York Islanders	82	34	37	11	27	203	255	−52	79
15	NE	Montreal Canadiens	82	31	35	16	26	212	226	−14	78

Source: National Hockey League
x – Clinched playoff spot; y – Clinched division; z – Clinched conference

== Schedule and results ==
=== Pre-season ===
2011–12 pre-season game log: 3–3–0
#	Date	Opponent	Score	OT	Decision	Arena	Attendance	Record	Recap
1	September 20	@ St. Louis Blues	1–3		Garon	Scottrade Center	10,451	0–1–0
2	September 21	St. Louis Blues	3–4		Janus	Amway Center		0–2–0
3	September 23	Florida Panthers	5–2		Roloson	St. Pete Times Forum	13,410	1–2–0
4	September 24	@ Florida Panthers	5–3		Garon	BankAtlantic Center	12,713	2–2–0
5	September 29	@ Montreal Canadiens	4–0		Roloson	Bell Centre	21,273	3–2–0
6	October 1	Montreal Canadiens	1–5			Colisée Pepsi		3–3–0

Schedule

Win Loss Overtime/shootout loss

=== Regular season ===
2011–12 game log

October: 5–4–2 (home: 3–1–0; road 2–3–2) 12 pts.
#	Date	Opponent	Score	OT	Decision	Arena	Attendance	Record	Pts	Recap
1	October 7	@ Carolina Hurricanes	5–1		Roloson	RBC Center	18,680	1–0–0	2
2	October 8	@ Boston Bruins	1–4		Garon	TD Garden	17,565	1–1–0	2
3	October 10	@ Washington Capitals	5–6	SO	Roloson	Verizon Center	18,506	1–1–1	3
4	October 13	@ New York Islanders	1–5		Roloson	Nassau Veterans Memorial Coliseum	9,759	1–2–1	3
5	October 15	@ Florida Panthers	2–3	SO	Garon	BankAtlantic Center	18,352	1–2–2	4
6	October 17	Florida Panthers	4–7		Roloson	St. Pete Times Forum	19,204	1–3–2	4
7	October 20	New York Islanders	4–1		Garon	St. Pete Times Forum	18,181	2–3–2	6
8	October 22	Buffalo Sabres	3–0		Garon	St. Pete Times Forum	19,204	3–3–2	8
9	October 25	@ Buffalo Sabres	4–3		Garon	First Niagara Center	18,690	4–3–2	10
10	October 27	@ Nashville Predators	3–5		Garon	Bridgestone Arena	16,619	4–4–2	10
11	October 29	Winnipeg Jets	1–0		Roloson	St. Pete Times Forum	19,204	5–4–2	12

November: 6–7–0 (home: 4–2–0; road 2–5–0) 12 pts.
#	Date	Opponent	Score	OT	Decision	Arena	Attendance	Record	Pts	Recap
12	November 1	@ Carolina Hurricanes	2–4		Roloson	RBC Center	13,374	5–5–2	12
13	November 4	Chicago Blackhawks	5–4	OT	Roloson	St. Pete Times Forum	19,204	6–5–2	14
14	November 6	@ Florida Panthers	4–3	SO	Roloson	BankAtlantic Center	15,066	7–5–2	16
15	November 9	Philadelphia Flyers	2–1	OT	Roloson	St. Pete Times Forum	19,204	8–5–2	18
16	November 12	@ St. Louis Blues	0–3		Garon	Scottrade Center	19,150	8–6–2	18
17	November 14	@ Winnipeg Jets	2–5		Roloson	MTS Centre	15,004	8–7–2	18
18	November 17	Pittsburgh Penguins	4–1		Roloson	St. Pete Times Forum	18,509	9–7–2	20
19	November 19	New Jersey Devils	2–4		Roloson	St. Pete Times Forum	18,894	9–8–2	20
20	November 22	Toronto Maple Leafs	1–7		Roloson	St. Pete Times Forum	19,204	9–9–2	20
21	November 25	@ Florida Panthers	2–1	OT	Garon	BankAtlantic Center	17,380	10–9–2	22
22	November 26	Florida Panthers	5–1		Garon	St. Pete Times Forum	17,481	11–9–2	24
23	November 28	@ Minnesota Wild	1–3		Garon	Xcel Energy Center	16,628	11–10–2	24
24	November 30	@ Detroit Red Wings	2–4		Roloson	Joe Louis Arena	20,066	11–11–2	24

December: 6–6–1 (home: 4–2–0; road 2–4–1) 13 pts.
#	Date	Opponent	Score	OT	Decision	Arena	Attendance	Record	Pts	Recap
25	December 3	New York Rangers	2–4		Garon	St. Pete Times Forum	19,204	11–12–2	24
26	December 5	@ Ottawa Senators	2–4		Roloson	Scotiabank Place	18,742	11–13–2	24
27	December 6	@ New York Islanders	1–5		Garon	Nassau Veterans Memorial Coliseum	9,486	11–14–2	24
28	December 8	@ New York Rangers	3–2	SO	Garon	Madison Square Garden	18,200	12–14–2	26
29	December 10	@ Philadelphia Flyers	2–5		Garon	Wells Fargo Center	19,772	12–15–2	26
30	December 12	New Jersey Devils	4–5		Garon	St. Pete Times Forum	17,341	12–16–2	26
31	December 15	Calgary Flames	5–4	OT	Garon	St. Pete Times Forum	17,241	13–16–2	28
32	December 17	@ Columbus Blue Jackets	3–2		Garon	Nationwide Arena	16,108	14–16–2	30
33	December 21	@ San Jose Sharks	2–7		Garon	HP Pavilion at San Jose	17,562	14–17–2	30
34	December 23	@ Colorado Avalanche	1–2	OT	Garon	Pepsi Center	16,165	14–17–3	31
35	December 27	Philadelphia Flyers	5–1		Garon	St. Pete Times Forum	19,204	15–17–3	33
36	December 29	Montreal Canadiens	4–3		Garon	St. Pete Times Forum	19,204	16–17–3	35
37	December 31	Carolina Hurricanes	5–2		Garon	St. Pete Times Forum	19,204	17–17–3	37

January: 5–6–1 (home: 3–2–1; road 2–4–0) 11 pts.
#	Date	Opponent	Score	OT	Decision	Arena	Attendance	Record	Pts	Recap
38	January 3	@ Toronto Maple Leafs	3–7		Garon	Air Canada Centre	19,425	17–18–3	37
39	January 5	@ Ottawa Senators	1–4		Roloson	Scotiabank Place	19,944	17–19–3	37
40	January 7	@ Montreal Canadiens	1–3		Garon	Bell Centre	21,273	17–20–3	37
41	January 10	Vancouver Canucks	4–5	SO	Roloson	Tampa Bay Times Forum	17,630	17–20–4	38
42	January 12	Carolina Hurricanes	2–5		Garon	Tampa Bay Times Forum	16,553	17–21–4	38
43	January 13	@ Washington Capitals	3–4		Roloson	Verizon Center	18,506	17–22–4	38
44	January 15	Pittsburgh Penguins	3–6		Garon	Tampa Bay Times Forum	19,204	17–23–4	38
45	January 17	Boston Bruins	5–3		Garon	Tampa Bay Times Forum	19,204	18–23–4	40
46	January 20	@ Dallas Stars	2–1		Garon	American Airlines Center	14,836	19–23–4	42
47	January 21	@ Phoenix Coyotes	4–3		Roloson	Jobing.com Arena	12,714	20–23–4	44
48	January 24	Columbus Blue Jackets	4–2		Garon	Tampa Bay Times Forum	16,859	21–23–4	46
All-Star Break (January 26–30)
49	January 31	Washington Capitals	4–3	OT	Garon	Tampa Bay Times Forum	17,754	22–23–4	48

February: 7–5–2 (home: 5–2–1; road 2–3–1) 16 pts.
#	Date	Opponent	Score	OT	Decision	Arena	Attendance	Record	Pts	Recap
50	February 2	Winnipeg Jets	1–2	OT	Garon	Tampa Bay Times Forum	16,923	22–23–5	49
51	February 4	Florida Panthers	6–3		Garon	Tampa Bay Times Forum	19,204	23–23–5	51
52	February 7	Los Angeles Kings	1–3		Roloson	Tampa Bay Times Forum	16,489	23–24–5	51
53	February 9	New York Rangers	3–4	OT	Garon	Madison Square Garden	18,200	23–24–6	52
54	February 11	@ Buffalo Sabres	2–1		Garon	First Niagara Center	18,690	24–24–6	54
55	February 12	@ Pittsburgh Penguins	2–4		Garon	Consol Energy Center	18,506	24–25–6	54
56	February 14	Ottawa Senators	0–4		Garon	Tampa Bay Times Forum	17,488	24–26–6	54
57	February 16	San Jose Sharks	6–5	OT	Roloson	Tampa Bay Times Forum	16,819	25–26–6	56
58	February 18	Washington Capitals	2–1		Garon	Tampa Bay Times Forum	19,204	26–26–6	58
59	February 21	Anaheim Ducks	3–2		Garon	Tampa Bay Times Forum	18,309	27–26–6	60
60	February 23	@ Winnipeg Jets	3–4		Garon	MTS Centre	15,004	27–27–6	60
61	February 25	@ Pittsburgh Penguins	1–8		Roloson	Consol Energy Center	18,596	27–28–6	60
62	February 26	@ New Jersey Devils	4–3		Garon	Prudential Center	15,981	28–28–6	62
63	February 28	Montreal Canadiens	2–1		Garon	Tampa Bay Times Forum	18,878	29–28–6	64

March: 7–7–1 (home: 5–5–0; road 2–2–1) 15 pts.
#	Date	Opponent	Score	OT	Decision	Arena	Attendance	Record	Pts	Recap
64	March 2	New York Rangers	4–3	OT	Garon	Tampa Bay Times Forum	19,204	30–28–6	66
65	March 3	@ Carolina Hurricanes	4–3	OT	Garon	RBC Center	17,116	31–28–6	68
66	March 6	Ottawa Senators	3–7		Roloson	Tampa Bay Times Forum	18,697	31–29–6	68
67	March 8	@ Washington Capitals	2–3	OT	Tokarski	Verizon Center	18,506	31–29–7	69
68	March 10	Carolina Hurricanes	2–4		Tokarski	Tampa Bay Times Forum	18,554	31–30–7	69
69	March 13	Boston Bruins	6–1		Tokarski	Tampa Bay Times Forum	19,204	32–30–7	71
70	March 15	Toronto Maple Leafs	1–3		Tokarski	Tampa Bay Times Forum	19,204	32–31–7	71
71	March 17	St. Louis Blues	1–3		Roloson	Tampa Bay Times Forum	18,777	32–32–7	71
72	March 19	Buffalo Sabres	3–7		Tokarski	Tampa Bay Times Forum	17,212	32–33–7	71
73	March 22	Edmonton Oilers	3–2	SO	Roloson	Tampa Bay Times Forum	17,893	33–33–7	73
74	March 24	New York Islanders	4–3		Roloson	Tampa Bay Times Forum	19,204	34–33–7	75
75	March 26	@ Philadelphia Flyers	5–3		Roloson	Wells Fargo Center	19,590	35–33–7	77
76	March 27	@ Boston Bruins	2–5		Roloson	TD Garden	17,565	35–34–7	77
77	March 29	@ New Jersey Devils	4–6		Roloson	Prudential Center	15,380	35–35–7	77
78	March 31	Winnipeg Jets	3–2	OT	Caron	Tampa Bay Times Forum	19,204	36–35–7	79

April: 2–1–1 (home: 1–0–0; road 1–1–1) 5 pts.
#	Date	Opponent	Score	OT	Decision	Arena	Attendance	Record	Pts	Recap
79	April 2	Washington Capitals	4–2		Roloson	Tampa Bay Times Forum	19,204	37–35–7	81
80	April 4	@ Montreal Canadiens	2–5		Caron	Bell Centre	21,273	37–36–7	81
81	April 5	@ Toronto Maple Leafs	2–3	OT	Roloson	Air Canada Centre	19,369	37–36–8	82
82	April 7	@ Winnipeg Jets	4–3	OT	Roloson	MTS Centre	15,004	38–36–8	84

Schedule

Win Loss Overtime/shootout loss

== Player stats ==
=== Skaters ===
Note: GP = Games played; G = Goals; A = Assists; Pts = Points; +/− = Plus/minus; PIM = Penalty minutes

Player	GP	G	A	Pts	+/−	PIM
Steven Stamkos	82	60	37	97	7	66
Martin St. Louis	77	25	49	74	−3	16
Teddy Purcell	81	24	41	65	9	16
Vincent Lecavalier	64	22	27	49	-2	50
Ryan Malone	68	20	28	48	−11	82
Steve Downie^{‡}	55	12	16	28	−15	121
Marc-Andre Bergeron	43	4	20	24	6	20
Victor Hedman	61	5	18	23	−9	65
Eric Brewer	82	1	20	21	−5	49
Tom Pyatt	74	12	7	19	−19	8
Dominic Moore^{‡}	56	4	15	19	−10	48
Matt Gilroy^{‡}	53	2	15	17	2	16
Brett Clark	82	2	13	15	−26	20
Nate Thompson	68	9	6	15	−23	21
Brett Connolly	68	4	11	15	−9	30
Bruno Gervais	50	6	7	13	−4	8
Ryan Shannon	45	4	8	12	−11	10
J. T. Wyman	40	2	9	11	1	8
Pavel Kubina^{‡}	52	3	8	11	1	59
Brian Lee^{†}	20	0	8	8	−6	8
Tim Wallace^{†}	18	3	5	8	4	10
Adam Hall	57	2	5	7	−11	17
Trevor Smith	16	2	3	5	2	4
Dana Tyrell	26	0	5	5	−5	6
Blair Jones^{‡}	22	2	2	4	−3	10
Brendan Mikkelson	41	1	2	3	−4	13
Pierre-Cedric Labrie	14	0	2	2	-2	15
Mike Angelidis	6	1	0	1	−1	5
Keith Aulie^{†}	19	0	1	1	−5	13
J. T. Brown	5	0	1	1	2	0
Mike Commodore^{†}	13	0	0	0	4	17
Brandon Segal	10	0	0	0	−2	4
Evan Oberg	3	0	0	0	2	0
Mattias Ritola^{‡}	5	0	0	0	−2	6

- Most goals in a single season by a Lightning player

=== Goaltenders ===
Note: GP = Games played; TOI = Time on ice (minutes); W = Wins; L = Losses; OT = Overtime losses; GA = Goals against; GAA= Goals against average; SA= Shots against; SV= Saves; Sv% = Save percentage; SO= Shutouts

Player	GP	Min	W	L	OT	GA	GAA	SA	Sv%	SO	G	A	PIM
Mathieu Garon	48	2484	23	16	5	118	2.85	1191	.901	1	0	2	0
Dwayne Roloson	40	2099	13	16	4	128	3.66	1126	.886	1	0	0	6
Dustin Tokarski	5	244	1	3	1	14	3.44	116	.879	0	0	1	2
Sebastien Caron	3	135	1	1	0	7	3.11	7	.877	0	0	0	0

^{†}Denotes player spent time with another team before joining Lightning. Stats reflect time with Lightning only.
^{‡}Traded mid-season
Bold/italics denotes franchise record

== Awards and records ==
=== Awards ===
Regular season
Player	Award	Awarded
Steven Stamkos	NHL Second Star of the Month	December 2011
Steven Stamkos	NHL First Star of the Week	January 2, 2012
Teddy Purcell	NHL Second Star of the Week	February 27, 2012
Steven Stamkos	NHL Third Star of the Month	February 2012
Steven Stamkos	NHL Second Star of the Week	April 9, 2012

=== Milestones ===
Regular season
Player	Milestone	Reached
Brett Clark	600th career NHL game	October 7, 2011
Brett Connolly	1st career NHL game	October 7, 2011
Ryan Malone	300th career NHL point	October 7, 2011
Martin St. Louis	300th career NHL goal	October 8, 2011
Brett Connolly	1st career NHL assist 1st career NHL point	October 10, 2011
Steve Downie	200th career NHL game	October 10, 2011
Nate Thompson	200th career NHL game	October 10, 2011
Ryan Malone	500th career NHL game	October 22, 2011
Vincent Lecavalier	800th career NHL point	October 25, 2011
Dominic Moore	100th career NHL assist	October 25, 2011
Teddy Purcell	200th career NHL game	October 27, 2011
Brett Connolly	1st career NHL goal	November 1, 2011
Steve Downie	100th career NHL point	November 17, 2011
Teddy Purcell	100th career NHL point	December 3, 2011
Martin St. Louis	800th career NHL point	December 6, 2011
Mathieu Garon	300th career NHL game	December 29, 2011
J. T. Wyman	1st career NHL goal 1st career NHL assist 1st career NHL point	December 29, 2011
Martin St. Louis	500th career NHL assist	December 31, 2011
Pierre-Cedric Labrie	1st career NHL game	January 7, 2012
Eric Brewer	800th career NHL game	January 12, 2012
Dana Tyrell	100th career NHL game	January 12, 2012
Pierre-Cedric Labrie	1st career NHL assist 1st career NHL point	January 21, 2012
Trevor Smith	1st career NHL assist	January 21, 2012
Mike Angelidis	1st career NHL game 1st career NHL goal 1st career NHL point	January 24, 2012
Dominic Moore	500th career NHL game	January 31, 2012
Martin St. Louis	900th career NHL game	February 4, 2012
Brendan Mikkelson	100th career NHL game	February 11, 2012
Steven Stamkos	300th career NHL game	February 16, 2012
Steven Stamkos	300th career NHL point	February 21, 2012
Tim Wallace	1st career NHL goal	March 3, 2012
Ryan Shannon	300th career NHL game	March 6, 2012
Victor Hedman	200th career NHL game	March 8, 2012
Dustin Tokarski	1st career NHL win	March 13, 2012
Brendan Mikkelson	1st career NHL goal	March 17, 2012
Dwayne Roloson	600th career NHL game	March 24, 2012
Brandon Segal	100th career NHL game	March 29, 2012
J. T. Brown	1st career NHL game	March 31, 2012
J. T. Brown	1st career NHL assist 1st career NHL point	April 7, 2012

== Transactions ==
The Lightning have been involved in the following transactions during the 2011–12 season.

=== Trades ===
Date	Details
June 25, 2011	To New York Islanders Future considerations	To Tampa Bay Lightning Bruno Gervais
June 25, 2011	To Phoenix Coyotes Marc-Antoine Pouliot	To Tampa Bay Lightning 7th-round pick in 2011
December 2, 2011	To Florida Panthers Mike Vernace; James Wright	To Tampa Bay Lightning Mike Kostka; Evan Oberg
January 6, 2012	To Calgary Flames Blair Jones	To Tampa Bay Lightning Brendan Mikkelson
February 16, 2012	To San Jose Sharks Dominic Moore; 7th-round pick in 2012	To Tampa Bay Lightning 2nd-round pick in 2012
February 18, 2012	To Philadelphia Flyers Pavel Kubina	To Tampa Bay Lightning Jon Kalinski; Conditional 2nd-round pick in 2012 or 2013 (Note: Philadelphia elected to trade 2nd-round pick in 2012.); 4th-round pick in 2013
February 19, 2012	To Colorado Avalanche Steve Downie	To Tampa Bay Lightning Kyle Quincey
February 19, 2012	To Detroit Red Wings Kyle Quincey	To Tampa Bay Lightning Sebastien Piche; 1st-round pick in 2012
February 19, 2012	To Chicago Blackhawks Matt Fornataro	To Tampa Bay Lightning Brandon Segal
February 27, 2012	To Detroit Red Wings Conditional 7th-round pick in 2013 (Note: Condition not satisfied.)	To Tampa Bay Lightning Mike Commodore
February 27, 2012	To Ottawa Senators Matt Gilroy	To Tampa Bay Lightning Brian Lee
February 27, 2012	To Toronto Maple Leafs Carter Ashton	To Tampa Bay Lightning Keith Aulie

=== Free agents signed ===
Player	Former team	Contract terms
Michel Ouellet	Hamburg Freezers	1 year, $525,000
Mathieu Garon	Columbus Blue Jackets	2 years, $2.6 million
J. T. Wyman	Montreal Canadiens	1 year, $525,000
Matt Gilroy	New York Rangers	1 year, $1 million
Richard Petiot	Edmonton Oilers	1 year, $525,000
Trevor Smith	Springfield Falcons	1 year
Tom Pyatt	Montreal Canadiens	1 year, $525,000
Alexandre Picard	San Antonio Rampage	1 year, $600,000
Ryan Shannon	Ottawa Senators	1 year, $625,000
Daniel Milan	Moncton Wildcats	3 years, $1.645 million entry-level contract
Antti Miettinen	Ak Bars Kazan	2 years, $3 million
Pierre-Cedric Labrie	Norfolk Admirals	2 years, $1.05 million
Cory Conacher	Norfolk Admirals	2 years, $1.7425 million entry-level contract
Danick Gauthier	Saint John Sea Dogs	3 years, $1.775 million entry-level contract
Sebastien Caron	Iserlohn Roosters	1 year, 525,000
J. T. Brown	University of Minnesota Duluth	2 years, $1.85 million entry-level contract

=== Free agents lost ===
Player	New team	Contract terms
Sean Bergenheim	Florida Panthers	4 years, $11 million
Mike Smith	Phoenix Coyotes	2 years, $4 million
Simon Gagne	Los Angeles Kings	2 years, $7 million
Randy Jones	Winnipeg Jets	1 year, $1.15 million
Cedrick Desjardins	Colorado Avalanche	1 year, $650,000
Mike Lundin	Minnesota Wild	1 year, $1 million
Matt Smaby	Anaheim Ducks	1 year, $600,000
Chris Durno	Carolina Hurricanes	1 year, $525,000
Mathieu Roy	Carolina Hurricanes	1 year, $600,000

=== Claimed via waivers ===
Player	Former team	Date claimed off waivers
Tim Wallace	New York Islanders	February 23, 2012

=== Lost via waivers ===
Player	New team	Date claimed off waivers
Antti Miettinen	Winnipeg Jets	December 13, 2011

=== Lost via retirement ===
Player

=== Player signings ===
Player	Date	Contract terms
Michael Vernace	June 13, 2011	1 year, $525,000
Mike Angelidis	June 15, 2011	1 year, $525,000
Blair Jones	June 24, 2011	1 year, $525,000
Eric Brewer	June 24, 2011	4 years, $15.4 million
Bruno Gervais	June 27, 2011	1 year, $550,000
Marc-Andre Bergeron	June 28, 2011	2 years, $2 million
Adam Hall	June 29, 2011	1 year, $600,000
Dwayne Roloson	June 30, 2011	1 year, $3 million
Brett Connolly	July 1, 2011	3 years, $2.7 million entry-level contract
Scott Jackson	July 15, 2011	1 year, $550,000
Steven Stamkos	July 19, 2011	5 years, $37.5 million
Teddy Purcell	July 20, 2011	2 years, $4.725 million
Ondrej Palat	October 10, 2011	3 years, $1.7 million entry-level contract
Dana Tyrell	November 28, 2011	2 years, $1.2 million contract extension
Victor Hedman	November 30, 2011	5 years, $20 million contract extension
Tom Pyatt	January 9, 2012	2 years, $1.2 million contract extension
Vladislav Namestnikov	March 13, 2012	3 years, $2.775 million entry-level contract
Alex Killorn	March 19, 2012	2 years, $1.75 million entry-level contract

== Draft picks ==
Tampa Bay's selections at the 2011 NHL entry draft.

Round	#	Player	Position	Nationality	College/junior/club team (league)
1	27	Vladislav Namestnikov	C	Russia	London Knights (OHL)
2	58	Nikita Kucherov	W	Russia	CSKA Moscow (KHL)
5	148	Nikita Nesterov	D	Russia	Traktor Chelyabinsk 2 (Russia-Jr.)
6	178	Adam Wilcox	G	United States	Green Bay Gamblers (USHL)
7	201 (from Phoenix)	Matthew Peca	C	Canada	Pembroke Lumber Kings (CCHL)
7	208	Ondrej Palat	LW	Czech Republic	Drummondville Voltigeurs (QMJHL)

== See also ==
- 2011–12 NHL season
