= 2011–12 Phoenix Coyotes season =

NHL hockey team season

2011–12 Phoenix Coyotes
- Pacific Division champions
- Division: 1st Pacific
- Conference: 3rd Western
- 2011–12 record: 42–27–13
- Home record: 22–13–6
- Road record: 20–14–7
- Goals for: 216
- Goals against: 204

Team information
- General manager: Don Maloney
- Coach: Dave Tippett
- Captain: Shane Doan
- Alternate captains: Martin Hanzal; Keith Yandle
- Arena: Jobing.com Arena
- Average attendance: 12,420 (73%)

Team leaders
- Goals: Radim Vrbata (35)
- Assists: Ray Whitney (53)
- Points: Ray Whitney (77)
- Penalty minutes: Raffi Torres (83)
- Plus/minus: Ray Whitney (+26)
- Wins: Mike Smith (38)
- Goals against average: Mike Smith (2.21)

The 2011–12 Phoenix Coyotes season was the franchise's 33rd season in the National Hockey League (NHL), their 40th overall and the 16th in Phoenix, Arizona. This would be the only season that the Coyotes won at least 1 playoff series before going defunct following the 2023-24 season.

== Off-season ==
On May 10, 2011, the Glendale City Council voted (by a 5–2 count) to keep the Coyotes in Arizona for the 2011–12 season on an interim basis while it tried to find a new owner to keep the team in Glendale. Before this vote, there was widespread speculation that the team would be re-locating back to Winnipeg as the Jets before the start of the 2011–12 NHL season. Potential owner Matthew Hulsizer ended his bid to purchase the Coyotes on June 27, leaving no current potential buyers of the team, once again leaving the Coyotes' future in question.

Pending free agent goaltender Ilya Bryzgalov was traded to the Philadelphia Flyers prior to the start of free agency.

The Coyotes ended their minor-league affiliation with the San Antonio Rampage and signed an affiliation with the Portland Pirates.

== Regular season ==
The Coyotes finished with their third straight 90-point season, with 97 points. On December 1, 2011, the Coyotes made their return to Winnipeg, for the first time since relocating from the city following the 1995–96 season. They faced off against the new Winnipeg Jets, in a 1–0 loss, where Bryan Little scored the only goal of the game. On April 7, 2012, the Coyotes defeated the Minnesota Wild with a score of 4–1 to win the Pacific Division title—their first and only division title as an NHL team.

== Playoffs ==
As Pacific Division champions, the Coyotes were the third seed in the Western Conference. They faced the Chicago Blackhawks in the first round, and defeated them in six games for the franchise's first playoff series win since 1987, when as the Winnipeg Jets, they defeated the Calgary Flames in the first round. The Coyotes defeated the fourth-seeded Nashville Predators in five games to advance to the first Western Conference Final in franchise history. The eighth-seeded and eventual Stanley Cup champion Los Angeles Kings knocked the Coyotes out of the playoffs in five games. This was the only season where the Coyotes advanced beyond the round of 16 teams, won two playoff series, and reached the Conference Finals before eventually suspending operations in 2024.

== Standings ==
Pacific Division
Pos	Team	GP	W	L	OTL	ROW	GF	GA	GD	Pts
1	y – Phoenix Coyotes	82	42	27	13	36	216	204	+12	97
2	x – San Jose Sharks	82	43	29	10	34	228	210	+18	96
3	x – Los Angeles Kings	82	40	27	15	34	194	179	+15	95
4	Dallas Stars	82	42	35	5	35	211	222	−11	89
5	Anaheim Ducks	82	34	36	12	31	204	231	−27	80

Source: National Hockey League
x – Clinched playoff spot; y – Clinched division

Western Conference
Pos	Div	Team	GP	W	L	OTL	ROW	GF	GA	GD	Pts
1	NW	p – Vancouver Canucks	82	51	22	9	43	249	198	+51	111
2	CE	y – St. Louis Blues	82	49	22	11	45	210	165	+45	109
3	PA	y – Phoenix Coyotes	82	42	27	13	36	216	204	+12	97
4	CE	x – Nashville Predators	82	48	26	8	43	237	210	+27	104
5	CE	x – Detroit Red Wings	82	48	28	6	39	248	203	+45	102
6	CE	x – Chicago Blackhawks	82	45	26	11	38	248	238	+10	101
7	PA	x – San Jose Sharks	82	43	29	10	34	228	210	+18	96
8	PA	x – Los Angeles Kings	82	40	27	15	34	194	179	+15	95
9	NW	Calgary Flames	82	37	29	16	34	202	226	−24	90
10	PA	Dallas Stars	82	42	35	5	35	211	222	−11	89
11	NW	Colorado Avalanche	82	41	35	6	32	208	220	−12	88
12	NW	Minnesota Wild	82	35	36	11	24	177	226	−49	81
13	PA	Anaheim Ducks	82	34	36	12	31	204	231	−27	80
14	NW	Edmonton Oilers	82	32	40	10	27	212	239	−27	74
15	CE	Columbus Blue Jackets	82	29	46	7	25	202	262	−60	65

Source: National Hockey League
p – Clinched Presidents' Trophy; x – Clinched playoff spot; y – Clinched division

== Schedule and results ==
=== Pre-season ===
2011 Pre-season game log: 3–4–0 (Home: 1–1–0; Road: 2–3–0)
#	Date	Visitor	Score	Home	OT	Decision	Attendance	Record
1	September 20	Phoenix Coyotes	7–4	Anaheim Ducks		Visentin	12,544	1–0–0
2	September 21	Los Angeles Kings (SS)	3–2	Phoenix Coyotes (SS)		Labarbera	5,047	1–1–0
3	September 21	Phoenix Coyotes (SS)	2–1	Los Angeles Kings (SS)	SO	Domingue	10,641	2–1–0
4	September 24	Phoenix Coyotes	0–1	San Jose Sharks		Labarbera	16,221	2–2–0
5	September 27	Phoenix Coyotes	2–3	Edmonton Oilers		Smith	16,218	2–3–0
6	September 29	Phoenix Coyotes	2–4	Calgary Flames		Labarbera	19,289	2–4–0
7	October 1	San Jose Sharks	1–3	Phoenix Coyotes		Smith	6,203	3–4–0
(SS) = Split-squad games.

=== Regular season ===
2011–12 Game Log

October: 5–3–2 (Home: 3–2–1; Road: 2–1–1)
#	Date	Visitor	Score	Home	OT	Decision	Attendance	Record	Pts
1	October 8	Phoenix Coyotes	3–6	San Jose Sharks		Smith	17,562	0–1–0	0
2	October 10	Phoenix Coyotes	1–2	Dallas Stars	SO	Smith	6,306	0–1–1	1
3	October 13	Phoenix Coyotes	5–2	Nashville Predators		LaBarbera	17,113	1–1–1	3
4	October 15	Winnipeg Jets	1–4	Phoenix Coyotes		Smith	17,132	2–1–1	5
5	October 18	Chicago Blackhawks	5–2	Phoenix Coyotes		LaBarbera	11,051	2–2–1	5
6	October 20	Los Angeles Kings	2–0	Phoenix Coyotes		Smith	7,128	2–3–1	5
7	October 23	Phoenix Coyotes	5–4	Anaheim Ducks		Smith	13,240	3–3–1	7
8	October 25	Dallas Stars	3–2	Phoenix Coyotes	SO	Smith	6,948	3–3–2	8
9	October 27	New Jersey Devils	3–5	Phoenix Coyotes		Smith	7,434	4–3–2	10
10	October 29	Los Angeles Kings	2–3	Phoenix Coyotes	OT	Smith	10,379	5–3–2	12

November: 8–4–1 (Home: 3–2–1; Road: 5–2–0)
#	Date	Visitor	Score	Home	OT	Decision	Attendance	Record	Pts
11	November 2	Phoenix Coyotes	4–1	Colorado Avalanche		Smith	12,141	6–3–2	14
12	November 3	Nashville Predators	3–0	Phoenix Coyotes		LaBarbera	6,738	6–4–2	14
13	November 5	Edmonton Oilers	2–4	Phoenix Coyotes		Smith	13,381	7–4–2	16
14	November 10	Montreal Canadiens	3–2	Phoenix Coyotes	OT	Smith	14,138	7–4–3	17
15	November 12	Phoenix Coyotes	3–0	San Jose Sharks		Smith	17,562	8–4–3	19
16	November 15	Phoenix Coyotes	3–2	Toronto Maple Leafs	SO	Smith	19,522	9–4–3	21
17	November 17	Phoenix Coyotes	1–2	Philadelphia Flyers		Smith	19,610	9–5–3	21
18	November 19	Phoenix Coyotes	4–2	Buffalo Sabres		Smith	18,690	10–5–3	23
19	November 21	Phoenix Coyotes	3–4	Washington Capitals		LaBarbera	18,506	10–6–3	23
20	November 23	Anaheim Ducks	2–4	Phoenix Coyotes		Smith	9,124	11–6–3	25
21	November 25	Vancouver Canucks	5–0	Phoenix Coyotes		Smith	14,569	11–7–3	25
22	November 26	Dallas Stars	0–3	Phoenix Coyotes		Smith	10,036	12–7–3	27
23	November 29	Phoenix Coyotes	4–1	Chicago Blackhawks		Smith	21,183	13–7–3	29

December: 6–9–1 (Home: 1–4–1; Road: 5–5–0)
#	Date	Visitor	Score	Home	OT	Decision	Attendance	Record	Pts
24	December 1	Phoenix Coyotes	0–1	Winnipeg Jets		Smith	15,004	13–8–3	29
25	December 3	Philadelphia Flyers	4–2	Phoenix Coyotes		Smith	14,913	13–9–3	29
26	December 5	Phoenix Coyotes	4–3	Chicago Blackhawks	SO	Smith	21,079	14–9–3	31
27	December 6	Phoenix Coyotes	3–2	Nashville Predators		LaBarbera	15,638	15–9–3	33
28	December 8	Phoenix Coyotes	2–5	Detroit Red Wings		Smith	20,066	15–10–3	33
29	December 10	Minnesota Wild	4–1	Phoenix Coyotes		Smith	10,976	15–11–3	33
30	December 14	Phoenix Coyotes	1–4	Anaheim Ducks		Smith	13,428	15–12–3	33
31	December 15	Edmonton Oilers	2–4	Phoenix Coyotes		Smith	9,397	16–12–3	35
32	December 17	New York Rangers	3–2	Phoenix Coyotes		Smith	12,172	16–13–3	35
33	December 20	Phoenix Coyotes	2–1	Florida Panthers		Smith	17,711	17–13–3	37
34	December 21	Phoenix Coyotes	4–3	Carolina Hurricanes		LaBarbera	15,848	18–13–3	39
35	December 23	St. Louis Blues	3–2	Phoenix Coyotes		LaBarbera	12,650	18–14–3	39
36	December 26	Phoenix Coyotes	3–4	Los Angeles Kings		LaBarbera	18,118	18–15–3	39
37	December 28	Boston Bruins	2–1	Phoenix Coyotes	OT	LaBarbera	17,459	18–15–4	40
38	December 29	Phoenix Coyotes	2–3	Colorado Avalanche		LaBarbera	17,389	18–16–4	40
39	December 31	Phoenix Coyotes	4–2	Minnesota Wild		McElhinney	19,297	19–16–4	42

January: 3–5–4 (Home: 3–2–1; Road: 0–3–3)
#	Date	Visitor	Score	Home	OT	Decision	Attendance	Record	Pts
40	January 3	Phoenix Coyotes	1–4	St. Louis Blues		Smith	18,112	19–17–4	42
41	January 5	Phoenix Coyotes	0–1	Los Angeles Kings	OT	Smith	18,118	19–17–5	43
42	January 7	New York Islanders	1–5	Phoenix Coyotes		Smith	13,350	20–17–5	45
43	January 10	Phoenix Coyotes	1–2	New York Rangers	SO	Smith	18,200	20–17–6	46
44	January 12	Phoenix Coyotes	2–3	Detroit Red Wings	SO	Smith	20,066	20–17–7	47
45	January 13	Phoenix Coyotes	3–4	Columbus Blue Jackets		LaBarbera	14,119	20–18–7	47
46	January 16	Colorado Avalanche	1–6	Phoenix Coyotes		Smith	12,757	21–18–7	49
47	January 18	Phoenix Coyotes	2–6	Anaheim Ducks		Smith	12,281	21–19–7	49
48	January 19	Detroit Red Wings	3–2	Phoenix Coyotes	SO	Smith	15,067	21–19–8	50
49	January 21	Tampa Bay Lightning	4–3	Phoenix Coyotes		Smith	12,714	21–20–8	50
50	January 24	Ottawa Senators	2–3	Phoenix Coyotes		Smith	8,061	22–20–8	52
51	January 31	Anaheim Ducks	4–1	Phoenix Coyotes		Smith	10,579	22–21–8	52

February: 11–0–1 (Home: 7–0–0; Road: 4–0–1)
#	Date	Visitor	Score	Home	OT	Decision	Attendance	Record	Pts
52	February 4	San Jose Sharks	3–5	Phoenix Coyotes		Smith	12,979	23–21–8	54
53	February 6	Detroit Red Wings	1–3	Phoenix Coyotes		Smith	12,687	24–21–8	56
54	February 7	Phoenix Coyotes	4–1	Dallas Stars		Smith	11,162	25–21–8	58
55	February 9	Calgary Flames	1–2	Phoenix Coyotes	OT	Smith	10,048	26–21–8	60
56	February 11	Chicago Blackhawks	0–3	Phoenix Coyotes		Smith	17,353	27–21–8	62
57	February 13	Phoenix Coyotes	1–2	Vancouver Canucks	SO	LaBarbera	18,890	27–21–9	63
58	February 16	Phoenix Coyotes	1–0	Los Angeles Kings		Smith	18,118	28–21–9	65
59	February 18	Dallas Stars	1–2	Phoenix Coyotes	OT	Smith	16,604	29–21–9	67
60	February 21	Los Angeles Kings	4–5	Phoenix Coyotes	SO	Smith	10,842	30–21–9	69
61	February 23	Phoenix Coyotes	4–3	Calgary Flames	SO	Smith	19,289	31–21–9	71
62	February 25	Phoenix Coyotes	3–1	Edmonton Oilers		Smith	16,839	32–21–9	73
63	February 28	Vancouver Canucks	1–2	Phoenix Coyotes	SO	Smith	16,691	33–21–9	75

March: 6–6–4 (Home: 4–3–2; Road: 2–3–2)
#	Date	Visitor	Score	Home	OT	Decision	Attendance	Record	Pts
64	March 1	Calgary Flames	4–2	Phoenix Coyotes		Smith	10,989	33–22–9	75
65	March 3	Columbus Blue Jackets	5–2	Phoenix Coyotes		Smith	13,579	33–23–9	75
66	March 5	Phoenix Coyotes	1–2	Pittsburgh Penguins		Smith	18,540	33–24–9	75
67	March 6	Phoenix Coyotes	2–3	Columbus Blue Jackets		LaBarbera	10,915	33–25–9	75
68	March 8	Minnesota Wild	3–2	Phoenix Coyotes	SO	LaBarbera	11,716	33–25–10	76
69	March 10	San Jose Sharks	0–3	Phoenix Coyotes		Smith	14,994	34–25–10	78
70	March 12	Nashville Predators	5–4	Phoenix Coyotes	SO	Smith	11,518	34–25–11	79
71	March 14	Phoenix Coyotes	5–4	Vancouver Canucks		Smith	18,890	35–25–11	81
72	March 15	Phoenix Coyotes	1–4	Calgary Flames		Smith	19,289	35–26–11	81
73	March 18	Phoenix Coyotes	3–2	Edmonton Oilers	SO	Smith	16,839	36–26–11	83
74	March 20	Phoenix Coyotes	3–4	Dallas Stars	SO	Smith	17,012	36–26–12	84
75	March 22	Colorado Avalanche	2–3	Phoenix Coyotes		Smith	14,938	37–26–12	86
76	March 24	Phoenix Coyotes	3–4	San Jose Sharks	SO	Smith	17,562	37–26–13	87
77	March 25	St. Louis Blues	4–0	Phoenix Coyotes		LaBarbera	12,585	37–27–13	87
78	March 29	San Jose Sharks	0–2	Phoenix Coyotes		Smith	14,446	38–27–13	89
79	March 31	Anaheim Ducks	0–4	Phoenix Coyotes		Smith	15,856	39–27–13	91

April: 3–0–0 (Home: 1–0–0; Road: 2–0–0)
#	Date	Visitor	Score	Home	OT	Decision	Attendance	Record	Pts
80	April 3	Columbus Blue Jackets	0–2	Phoenix Coyotes		Smith	13,263	40–27–13	93
81	April 6	Phoenix Coyotes	4–1	St. Louis Blues		Smith	19,150	41–27–13	95
82	April 7	Phoenix Coyotes	4–1	Minnesota Wild		Smith	18,864	42–27–13	97

Legend: Win (2 points) Loss (0 points) Overtime/shootout loss (1 point)

=== Playoffs ===
Key: Win Loss

2012 Stanley Cup Playoffs

Western Conference Quarter-finals: vs. (6) Chicago Blackhawks – Coyotes win series 4–2
#	Date	Visitor	Score	Home	OT	Decision	Attendance	Series	Recap
1	April 12	Chicago Blackhawks	2–3	Phoenix Coyotes	OT	Smith	17,138	1–0
2	April 14	Chicago Blackhawks	4–3	Phoenix Coyotes	OT	Smith	17,539	1–1
3	April 17	Phoenix Coyotes	3–2	Chicago Blackhawks	OT	Smith	21,627	2–1
4	April 19	Phoenix Coyotes	3–2	Chicago Blackhawks	OT	Smith	22,111	3–1
5	April 21	Chicago Blackhawks	2–1	Phoenix Coyotes	OT	Smith	17,746	3–2
6	April 23	Phoenix Coyotes	4–0	Chicago Blackhawks		Smith	21,636	4–2

Western Conference Semi-finals: vs. (4) Nashville Predators – Coyotes win series 4–1
#	Date	Visitor	Score	Home	OT	Decision	Attendance	Series	Recap
1	April 27	Nashville Predators	3–4	Phoenix Coyotes	OT	Smith	17,187	1–0
2	April 29	Nashville Predators	3–5	Phoenix Coyotes		Smith	17,217	2–0
3	May 2	Phoenix Coyotes	0–2	Nashville Predators		Smith	17,113	2–1
4	May 4	Phoenix Coyotes	1–0	Nashville Predators		Smith	17,113	3–1
5	May 7	Nashville Predators	1–2	Phoenix Coyotes		Smith	17,182	4–1

Western Conference Finals: vs. (8) Los Angeles Kings – Kings win series 4–1
#	Date	Visitor	Score	Home	OT	Decision	Attendance	Series	Recap
1	May 13	Los Angeles Kings	4–2	Phoenix Coyotes		Smith	17,134	0–1
2	May 15	Los Angeles Kings	4–0	Phoenix Coyotes		Smith	17,149	0–2
3	May 17	Phoenix Coyotes	1–2	Los Angeles Kings		Smith	18,367	0–3
4	May 20	Phoenix Coyotes	2–0	Los Angeles Kings		Smith	18,402	1–3
5	May 22	Los Angeles Kings	4–3	Phoenix Coyotes	OT	Smith	17,148	1–4

== Player statistics ==
=== Skaters ===
Regular season

Player	GP	G	A	Pts	+/−	PIM
Ray Whitney	82	24	53	77	26	28
Radim Vrbata	77	35	27	62	24	24
Shane Doan	79	22	28	50	−8	48
Keith Yandle	82	11	32	43	5	51
Lauri Korpikoski	82	17	20	37	3	14
Martin Hanzal	64	8	26	34	12	63
Oliver Ekman-Larsson	82	13	19	32	0	32
Daymond Langkow	73	11	19	30	−4	14
Raffi Torres	79	15	11	26	2	83
Mikkel Boedker	82	11	13	24	−2	12
Boyd Gordon	75	8	15	23	9	10
Taylor Pyatt	73	9	10	19	−4	23
Kyle Chipchura	53	3	13	16	2	42
Gilbert Brule	33	5	9	14	7	11
Rostislav Klesla	65	3	10	13	13	54
Michal Rozsival	54	1	12	13	8	34
David Schlemko	46	1	10	11	7	10
Derek Morris	59	2	9	11	−12	38
Antoine Vermette^{†}	22	3	7	10	4	16
Adrian Aucoin	64	2	7	9	14	42
Cal O'Reilly^{†‡}	22	2	3	5	−5	2
Patrick O'Sullivan	23	2	2	4	−4	2
Marc-Antoine Pouliot	13	0	4	4	−2	2
Chris Summers	21	0	3	3	−4	11
Michael Stone	13	1	2	3	7	2
David Rundblad^{†}	6	0	3	3	−1	0
Paul Bissonnette	31	1	0	1	−4	41
Petteri Nokelainen^{‡}	5	0	1	1	−1	0
Andy Miele	7	0	0	0	−3	6
Matt Watkins	1	0	0	0	−1	0
Alexandre Bolduc	2	0	0	0	−1	2
Kyle Turris^{‡}	6	0	0	0	−2	4

Playoffs

Player	GP	G	A	Pts	+/−	PIM
Antoine Vermette	16	5	5	10	−2	24
Shane Doan	16	5	4	9	2	41
Keith Yandle	16	1	8	9	5	10
Rostislav Klesla	15	2	6	8	−2	4
Mikkel Boedker	16	4	4	8	1	0
Ray Whitney	16	2	5	7	−1	10
Daymond Langkow	16	1	6	7	2	4
Derek Morris	16	2	4	6	4	24
Taylor Pyatt	16	4	2	6	−5	2
Martin Hanzal	12	3	3	6	2	29
Radim Vrbata	16	2	3	5	−3	8
Kyle Chipchura	15	1	3	4	4	7
Oliver Ekman-Larsson	16	1	3	4	−3	8
Gilbert Brule	12	2	1	3	1	0
Adrian Aucoin	11	0	2	2	4	10
Raffi Torres	3	1	1	2	2	2
Boyd Gordon	16	0	2	2	−2	6
Marc-Antoine Pouliot	8	1	1	2	2	2
Michal Rozsival	15	0	0	0	−3	2
Paul Bissonnette	3	0	0	0	0	15
Lauri Korpikoski	11	0	0	0	−3	2
David Schlemko	5	0	0	0	0	0
Michael Stone	2	0	0	0	−2	0

=== Goaltenders ===
Regular season

Player	GP	Min	W	L	OTL	GA	GAA	SA	Sv%	SO	G	A	PIM
Mike Smith	67	3903	38	18	10	144	2.21	2066	.930	8	0	2	16
Jason LaBarbera	19	1015	3	9	3	43	2.54	486	.912	0	0	0	2
Curtis McElhinney^{‡}	2	72	1	0	0	2	1.67	36	.944	0	0	0	0

Playoffs

Player	GP	Min	W	L	GA	GAA	SA	Sv%	SO	G	A	PIM
Mike Smith	16	1027	9	7	34	1.99	602	.944	3	0	1	14

^{†}Denotes player spent time with another team before joining Coyotes. Stats reflect time with the Coyotes only.
^{‡}Traded mid-season.
Bold/italics denotes franchise record.

Note:

Pos = Position;GP = Games played; G = Goals; A = Assists; Pts = Points; PIM = Penalty minutes; +/- = Plus/minus; PPG = Power-play goals; SHG = Short-handed goals; GWG = Game-winning goals
Pos = Position;GP = Games played; Min, TOI = Minutes played; W = Wins; L = Losses; T,T/OT = Ties; OTL = Overtime losses; GA = Goals-against; GAA = Goals-against average; SO = Shutouts; SA = Shots against; SV = Shots saved;SV% = Save percentage;

== Awards and records ==
=== Awards ===
Regular Season
Player	Award	Awarded
Mike Smith	NHL First Star of the Week	February 13, 2012
Mike Smith	NHL First Star of the Month	February 2012
Mike Smith	NHL Third Star of the Week	April 2, 2012
Mike Smith	NHL First Star of the Week	April 9, 2012

=== Milestones ===
Regular season
Player	Milestone	Reached
Raffi Torres	100th Career NHL Assist	October 13, 2011
Andy Miele	1st Career NHL Game	October 23, 2011
Shane Doan	300th Career NHL Goal	October 25, 2011
Martin Hanzal	300th Career NHL Game	November 10, 2011
Keith Yandle	300th Career NHL Game	November 17, 2011
Taylor Pyatt	700th Career NHL Game	November 19, 2011
Ray Whitney	600th Career NHL Assist	December 8, 2011
Cal O'Reilly	100th Career NHL Game	December 26, 2011
David Schlemko	100th Career NHL Game	December 29, 2011
Shane Doan	1st Career NHL Hat Trick	January 7, 2012
Boyd Gordon	400th Career NHL Game	January 13, 2012
Boyd Gordon	100th Career NHL Point	January 16, 2012
Chris Summers	1st Career NHL Assist; 1st Career NHL Point	January 16, 2012
Kyle Chipchura	200th Career NHL Game	January 21, 2012
Mike Smith	200th Career NHL Game	January 24, 2012
Oliver Ekman-Larsson	100th Career NHL Game	February 4, 2012
Ray Whitney	1,200th Career NHL Game	February 6, 2012
Rostislav Klesla	100th Career NHL Assist	February 7, 2012
Michael Stone	1st Career NHL Game	February 18, 2012
Matt Watkins	1st Career NHL Game	February 21, 2012
Martin Hanzal	100th Career NHL Assist	February 25, 2012
Radim Vrbata	200th Career NHL Assist	March 5, 2012
Michael Stone	1st Career NHL Assist; 1st Career NHL Point	March 8, 2012
Michael Stone	1st Career NHL Goal	March 10, 2012
Dave Tippett	400th Career NHL Win (coach)	March 19, 2012
Mikkel Boedker	200th Career NHL Game	March 20, 2012
Mike Smith	100th Career NHL Win	March 22, 2012
Lauri Korpikoski	100th Career NHL Point	March 24, 2012
Daymond Langkow	400th Career NHL Assist	March 24, 2012
Derek Morris	1,000th Career NHL Game	March 25, 2012
Ray Whitney	1,000th Career NHL Point	March 31, 2012
Lauri Korpikoski	300th Career NHL Game	April 7, 2012

== Transactions ==
The Coyotes have been involved in the following transactions during the 2011–12 season.

=== Trades ===
Date	Details
May 8, 2011	To New York Rangers Oscar Lindberg	To Phoenix Coyotes Ethan Werek
June 7, 2011	To Philadelphia Flyers Ilya Bryzgalov (Note: Trade of negotiating rights to.)	To Phoenix Coyotes Matt Clackson; 3rd-round pick in 2012; Future conditional draft pick
June 25, 2011	To Tampa Bay Lightning 7th-round pick in 2011	To Phoenix Coyotes Marc-Antoine Pouliot
August 29, 2011	To Calgary Flames Lee Stempniak	To Phoenix Coyotes Daymond Langkow
September 8, 2011	To Florida Panthers Justin Bernhardt	To Phoenix Coyotes Marc Cheverie
October 23, 2011	To Montreal Canadiens Petteri Nokelainen; Garrett Stafford	To Phoenix Coyotes Brock Trotter; 7th-round pick in 2012
October 28, 2011	To Nashville Predators 4th-round pick in 2012	To Phoenix Coyotes Cal O'Reilly
December 17, 2012	To Ottawa Senators Kyle Turris	To Phoenix Coyotes David Rundblad; 2nd-round pick in 2012
February 22, 2012	To Columbus Blue Jackets Curtis McElhinney; 2nd-round pick in 2012; Conditional 5th-round pick in 2013 (Note: Condition satisfied.)	To Phoenix Coyotes Antoine Vermette

=== Free agents acquired ===
Player	Former team	Contract terms
Petteri Nokelainen	Jokerit	1 year, $550,000
Boyd Gordon	Washington Capitals	2 years, $2.65 million
Mike Smith	Tampa Bay Lightning	2 years, $4 million
Raffi Torres	Vancouver Canucks	2 years, $3.5 million
Alexandre Bolduc	Vancouver Canucks	1 year, $575,000
Tyler Eckford	New Jersey Devils	1 year, $525,000
Curtis McElhinney	Ottawa Senators	1 year, $625,000
Nathan Oystrick	St. Louis Blues	1 year, $600,000
Dean Arsene	Peoria Rivermen	1 year, $725,000
Kyle Chipchura	Anaheim Ducks	1 year, $550,000
Justin Pogge	Carolina Hurricanes	1 year, $575,000
Patrick O'Sullivan	Minnesota Wild	1 year, $625,000
Brendan Shinnimin	Tri-City Americans	3 years, $2.0025 million entry-level contract
Scott Arnold	Niagara University	2 years, $1.85 million entry-level contract
Mark Louis	Portland Pirates	1 year, $550,000

=== Free agents lost ===
Player	New team	Contract terms
Jonas Ahnelov	Modo Hockey	2 years
Ed Jovanovski	Florida Panthers	4 years, $16.5 million
Nolan Yonkman	Florida Panthers	2 years, $1.4 million
Eric Belanger	Edmonton Oilers	3 years, $5.25 million
Vernon Fiddler	Dallas Stars	3 years, $5.4 million
Andrew Ebbett	Vancouver Canucks	1 year, $525,000
Matt Climie	Vancouver Canucks	1 year, $525,000
Alexandre Picard	Tampa Bay Lightning	1 year, $600,000
Dane Byers	Columbus Blue Jackets	1 year, $550,000

=== Claimed via waivers ===
Player	Former team	Date claimed off waivers
Brett MacLean	Winnipeg Jets	October 29, 2011
Gilbert Brule	Edmonton Oilers	January 10, 2012

=== Lost via waivers ===
Player	New team	Date claimed off waivers
Brett MacLean	Winnipeg Jets	October 6, 2011
Cal O'Reilly	Pittsburgh Penguins	February 1, 2012

=== Player signings ===
Player	Date	Contract terms
Ethan Werek	May 19, 2011	3 years, $2.17 million entry-level contract
Louis Domingue	June 1, 2011	3 years, $1.74 million entry-level contract
Jordan Szwarz	June 1, 2011	3 years, $1.84006 million entry-level contract
Justin Weller	June 2, 2011	3 years, $1.695 million entry-level contract
Jason LaBarbera	June 6, 2011	2 years, $2.5 million
Radim Vrbata	July 2, 2011	3 years, $9 million
Keith Yandle	July 5, 2011	5 years, $26.5 million
Matt Watkins	July 6, 2011	1 year, $550,000
Brett MacLean	July 19, 2011	1 year, $735,000
Marc-Antoine Pouliot	July 19, 2011	1 year, $605,000
Matt Beaudoin	July 19, 2011	1 year, $525,000
Lauri Korpikoski	July 20, 2011	2 years, $3.6 million
Connor Murphy	August 4, 2011	3 years, $2.775 million entry-level contract
Viktor Tikhonov	August 10, 2011	1 year, $826,875
Mikkel Boedker	August 18, 2011	2 years, $2.2 million
Paul Bissonnette	October 5, 2011	2 years, $1.475 million contract extension
Martin Hanzal	October 6, 2011	5 years, $15.5 million contract extension
Kyle Turris	November 22, 2011	2 years, $2.8 million
Chris Brown	March 29, 2012	3 years, $2.56 million entry-level contract
Mike Lee	March 29, 2012	3 years, $1.92 million entry-level contract
Phil Lane	May 29, 2012	3 years, $1.75 million entry-level contract

== Draft picks ==
Phoenix's picks at the 2011 NHL entry draft in St. Paul, Minnesota.

Round	#	Player	Position	Nationality	College/junior/club team (league)
1	20	Connor Murphy	D	United States	U.S. National Team Development Program (USHL)
2	51	Alexander Ruutu	C	Finland	Jokerit (SM-liiga)
2	56 (from Philadelphia)	Lucas Lessio	LW	Canada	Oshawa Generals (OHL)
3	84 (from Pittsburgh)	Harrison Ruopp	D	Canada	Prince Albert Raiders (WHL)
4	111	Kale Kessy	LW	Canada	Medicine Hat Tigers (WHL)
5	141	Darian Dziurzynski	LW	Canada	Saskatoon Blades (WHL)
6	155 (from NY Islanders)	Andrew Fritsch	RW	Canada	Owen Sound Attack (OHL)
7	196 (from NY Rangers)	Zac Larraza	LW	United States	U.S. National Team Development Program (USHL)

== See also ==
- 2011–12 NHL season
- Phoenix Coyotes bankruptcy
