= Mark Flood (ice hockey) =

Canadian ice hockey player (born 1984)

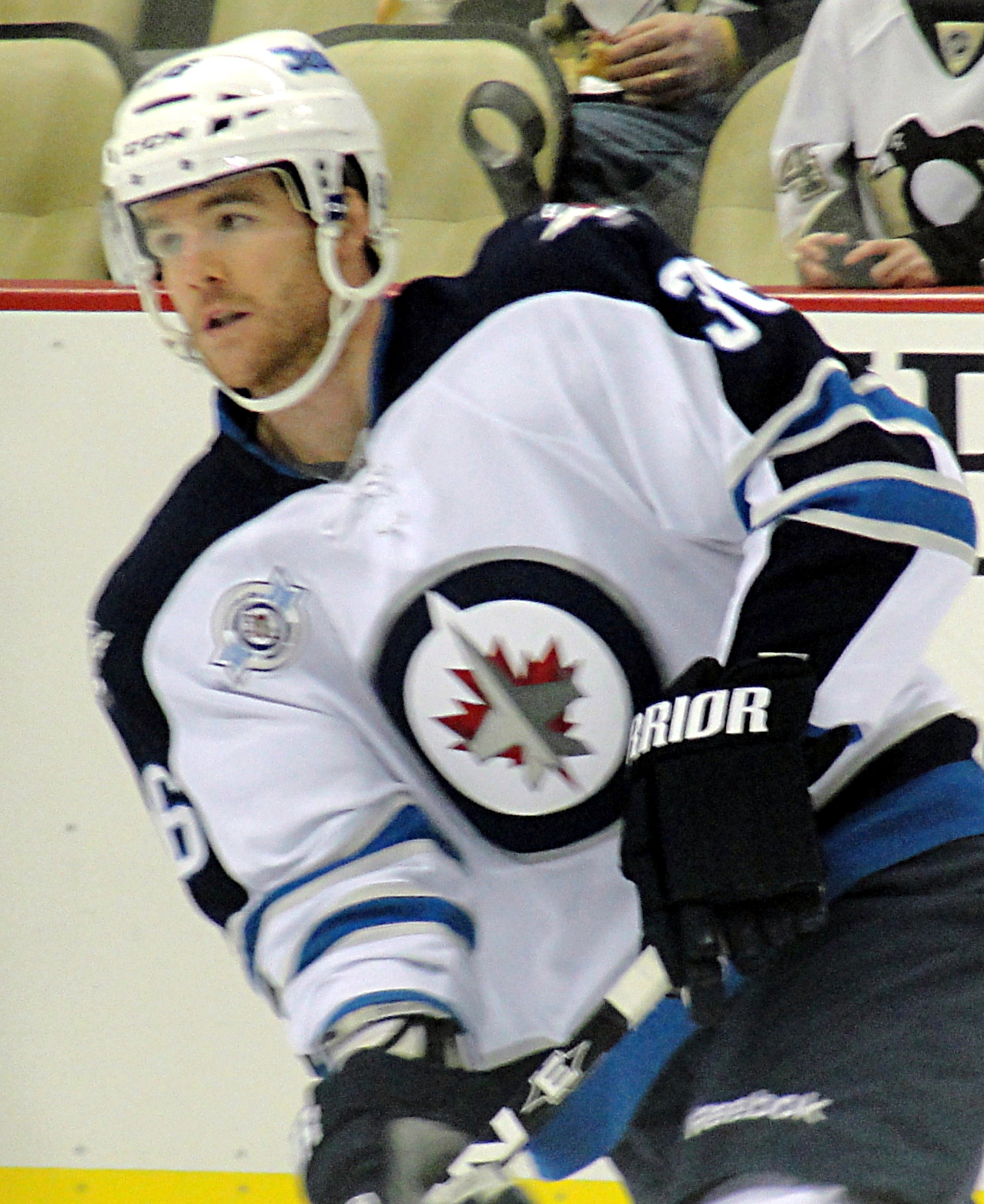
- Flood with the Jets in 2012.
- Born: September 29, 1984 (age 42) Charlottetown, Prince Edward Island, Canada
- Height: 6 ft 1 in (185 cm)
- Weight: 190 lb (86 kg; 13 st 8 lb)
- Position: Defence
- Shot: Right
- Played for: New York Islanders; Winnipeg Jets; Lokomotiv Yaroslavl; KHL Medveščak Zagreb; HC Lada Togliatti; EC Red Bull Salzburg; Ilves; Vienna Capitals
- NHL draft: 188th overall, 2003; Montreal Canadiens
- Playing career: 2005–2022

Mark Flood (born September 29, 1984) is a Canadian former professional ice hockey defenceman. He was selected in the sixth round, 188th overall, by the Montreal Canadiens in the 2003 NHL entry draft, and previously played for the New York Islanders and Winnipeg Jets.

== Playing career ==
Flood was drafted in the sixth round, 188th overall, in the 2003 NHL entry draft by the Montreal Canadiens. He played in the ECHL prior to signing a free agent contract with the Columbus Blue Jackets playing for their AHL affiliate, the Syracuse Crunch. On November 26, 2006 Flood was traded to the Carolina Hurricanes organization for defensemen Derrick Walser.

He was not re-signed by Carolina and on July 6, 2009 he signed a one-year, two-way contract with the New York Islanders. Flood spent the majority of the season in the AHL. Following a concussion to Islanders defensemen Dustin Kohn Flood was called up to the NHL, making his debut on March 25, 2010 against the Calgary Flames. Flood played 6 games for the Islanders registering 1 assist and a -4 plus-minus rating. During the 2010 offseason, Flood signed a one-way contract with the Manitoba Moose (farm team of the Vancouver Canucks). On July 3 he signed a contract to play for the Winnipeg Jets. He scored his first NHL goal as a member of the Jets against Martin Brodeur of the New Jersey Devils on November 5, 2011.

On July 22, 2012, it was reported that Flood had signed a contract with Lokomotiv Yaroslavl of the Russian Kontinental Hockey League. Flood was a part of the rebirth of the organization following the 2011 Lokomotiv Yaroslavl plane crash tragedy that forced Lokomotiv to cancel its 2011–2012 season. In 52 games with Yaroslavl, Flood was a stay-at-home fixture on the blueline, posting 6 points throughout the 2012–13 season.

On July 10, 2013, Flood returned to North America and signed a one-year two-way contract with the Carolina Hurricanes.

Flood returned to the KHL after a single season within the Hurricanes organization in signing a two-year deal with KHL Medvescak Zagreb on June 11, 2014. After a single season in Croatia, Flood moved to KHL rivals HC Lada Togliatti on a one-year contract on June 19, 2015. In the following 2015–16 season, Flood struggled to find his offensive presence with Togliatti, contributing with 6 points from the blueline in 38 contests.

On June 24, 2016, Flood left the KHL to sign a one-year contract with Austrian club EC Red Bull Salzburg of the Austrian Hockey League (EBEL).

In the following off-season, Flood returned to North America as a free agent. He accepted an invitation to try out for the 2017–18 season, with the Manitoba Moose of the AHL on September 25, 2017. Joining the affiliate of former club the Winnipeg Jets, Flood played in a single game with the Moose before he was released from his tryout on October 17, 2017.

After spending his second season in the Finnish Liiga with Ilves in 2018–19, Flood returned to the Austrian EBEL, agreeing to a one-year contract with the Vienna Capitals on June 18, 2019.

== Post-playing career ==
As of 2024, he is working with the Ottawa Senators as a professional scout.

== Career statistics ==
| | | | Regular season | | | | | Playoffs |
| Season | Team | League | GP | G | A | Pts | PIM | GP | G | A | Pts | PIM |
|---|---|---|---|---|---|---|---|---|---|---|---|---|
| 2000–01 | Charlottetown Islanders AAA | Midget |
| 2000–01 | Charlottetown Abbies | MHL | 11 | 0 | 2 | 2 | 2 | — | — | — | — | — |
| 2001–02 | Peterborough Petes | OHL | 57 | 1 | 4 | 5 | 21 | 6 | 0 | 0 | 0 | 2 |
| 2002–03 | Peterborough Petes | OHL | 68 | 5 | 24 | 29 | 18 | 7 | 1 | 2 | 3 | 0 |
| 2003–04 | Peterborough Petes | OHL | 68 | 15 | 29 | 44 | 30 | — | — | — | — | — |
| 2004–05 | Peterborough Petes | OHL | 60 | 4 | 37 | 41 | 14 | 14 | 2 | 7 | 9 | 0 |
| 2005–06 | Syracuse Crunch | AHL | 9 | 1 | 1 | 2 | 2 | — | — | — | — | — |
| 2005–06 | Dayton Bombers | ECHL | 50 | 11 | 14 | 25 | 20 | — | — | — | — | — |
| 2006–07 | Syracuse Crunch | AHL | 8 | 1 | 1 | 2 | 2 | — | — | — | — | — |
| 2006–07 | Albany River Rats | AHL | 36 | 3 | 7 | 10 | 20 | — | — | — | — | — |
| 2007–08 | Albany River Rats | AHL | 53 | 10 | 12 | 22 | 18 | — | — | — | — | — |
| 2008–09 | Albany River Rats | AHL | 76 | 6 | 25 | 31 | 27 | — | — | — | — | — |
| 2009–10 | Bridgeport Sound Tigers | AHL | 61 | 10 | 23 | 33 | 39 | 5 | 0 | 2 | 2 | 6 |
| 2009–10 | New York Islanders | NHL | 6 | 0 | 1 | 1 | 0 | — | — | — | — | — |
| 2010–11 | Manitoba Moose | AHL | 63 | 11 | 29 | 40 | 29 | 14 | 0 | 6 | 6 | 2 |
| 2011–12 | St. John's Ice Caps | AHL | 11 | 1 | 5 | 6 | 4 | — | — | — | — | — |
| 2011–12 | Winnipeg Jets | NHL | 33 | 3 | 4 | 7 | 10 | — | — | — | — | — |
| 2012–13 | Lokomotiv Yaroslavl | KHL | 52 | 1 | 5 | 6 | 25 | 6 | 0 | 0 | 0 | 2 |
| 2013–14 | Charlotte Checkers | AHL | 74 | 13 | 18 | 31 | 27 | — | — | — | — | — |
| 2014–15 | KHL Medveščak Zagreb | KHL | 60 | 8 | 15 | 23 | 30 | — | — | — | — | — |
| 2015–16 | Lada Togliatti | KHL | 38 | 2 | 4 | 6 | 16 | — | — | — | — | — |
| 2016–17 | EC Red Bull Salzburg | AUT | 50 | 4 | 22 | 26 | 18 | 11 | 0 | 3 | 3 | 0 |
| 2017–18 | Manitoba Moose | AHL | 1 | 0 | 0 | 0 | 2 | — | — | — | — | — |
| 2017–18 | Ilves | Liiga | 38 | 1 | 7 | 8 | 16 | — | — | — | — | — |
| 2018–19 | Ilves | Liiga | 60 | 3 | 6 | 9 | 48 | 7 | 2 | 2 | 4 | 6 |
| 2019–20 | Vienna Capitals | AUT | 48 | 4 | 23 | 27 | 20 | 3 | 0 | 1 | 1 | 2 |
| 2020–21 | Dragons de Rouen | FRA | 22 | 3 | 10 | 13 | 16 | — | — | — | — | — |
| 2021–22 | Dragons de Rouen | FRA | 43 | 6 | 26 | 32 | 20 | 13 | 0 | 4 | 4 | 20 |
| AHL totals | | | 392 | 56 | 121 | 177 | 170 | 19 | 0 | 8 | 8 | 8 |
| NHL totals | | | 39 | 3 | 5 | 8 | 10 | — | — | — | — | — |
| KHL totals | | | 150 | 11 | 24 | 35 | 71 | 6 | 0 | 0 | 0 | 2 |
