= 2011–12 Los Angeles Kings season =

NHL team season; 2012 Stanley Cup Champions

2011–12 Los Angeles Kings
- Stanley Cup champions
- Western Conference champions
- Division: 3rd Pacific
- Conference: 8th Western
- 2011–12 record: 40–27–15
- Home record: 22–14–5
- Road record: 18–13–10
- Goals for: 194
- Goals against: 179

Team information
- General manager: Dean Lombardi
- Coach: Terry Murray (Oct.–Dec.); John Stevens (interim, Dec.); Darryl Sutter (Dec.–Jun.)
- Captain: Dustin Brown
- Alternate captains: Matt Greene; Anze Kopitar
- Arena: Staples Center
- Average attendance: 18,118

Team leaders
- Goals: Anze Kopitar (25)
- Assists: Anze Kopitar (51)
- Points: Anze Kopitar (76)
- Penalty minutes: Kyle Clifford (123)
- Plus/minus: Willie Mitchell (+20)
- Wins: Jonathan Quick (35)
- Goals against average: Jonathan Quick (1.95)

The 2011–12 Los Angeles Kings season was the 45th season (44th season of play) for the National Hockey League (NHL) franchise. Although they finished the season with 95 points and the eighth seed in the Western Conference playoffs, they went on to capture the first Stanley Cup championship in team history.

== Regular season ==
On December 12, 2011, the Kings fired head coach Terry Murray and named John Stevens interim head coach. On December 20, 2011, the Kings hired Darryl Sutter to be their head coach, replacing Stevens.

With only one month to play in the regular season, the Kings were tenth in the Western Conference, two seeds away from a playoff spot. Their defense and goal tending were the only highlights throughout most of the season, highlighted by Jonathan Quick and Drew Doughty. The offense was lirstoaded with talent, but unable to find any kind of significant consistency until the final month and a half, when they proceeded to go 12–4–3 in their final 19 games as their offense finally caught fire and started scoring the goals they lacked earlier in the year. They secured the eighth and final playoff seed in their 81st (and second-to-last game), a shoot-out loss to their arch rivals, the San Jose Sharks.

Out of the Kings' 82 regular season games, 21 ended in a shutout; the Kings were shut-out ten times, the most of any NHL team in the regular season.

== Playoffs ==
The Kings made the playoffs for the third consecutive season, needing a win in the final game to secure the eighth seed. The Kings also became the second team to eliminate the first, second and third seeds from the playoffs in the same post-season (after the 2003–04 Calgary Flames), as well as the only team to win the Stanley Cup after defeating the first, second and third seeds in sequence, and the only team to ever win the Stanley Cup after defeating the Presidents' Trophy winner in the first round. (Darryl Sutter was the head coach of both the 2003–04 Flames and 2011–12 Kings.) They then defeated the New Jersey Devils in the Stanley Cup Final, becoming the first eighth seed in North American professional sports history to win a championship. They are also one of the few teams to win a championship after never benefiting from home-venue advantage in the post-season after the 1994-95 New Jersey Devils. The Kings became the third team in NHL history to win a championship with a losing record, having just 40 wins in the regular season. Los Angeles would start every series by winning the first three games, only sweeping the St. Louis Blues.

== Standings ==
Pacific Division
Pos	Team	GP	W	L	OTL	ROW	GF	GA	GD	Pts
1	y – Phoenix Coyotes	82	42	27	13	36	216	204	+12	97
2	x – San Jose Sharks	82	43	29	10	34	228	210	+18	96
3	x – Los Angeles Kings	82	40	27	15	34	194	179	+15	95
4	Dallas Stars	82	42	35	5	35	211	222	−11	89
5	Anaheim Ducks	82	34	36	12	31	204	231	−27	80

Source: National Hockey League
x – Clinched playoff spot; y – Clinched division

Western Conference
Pos	Div	Team	GP	W	L	OTL	ROW	GF	GA	GD	Pts
1	NW	p – Vancouver Canucks	82	51	22	9	43	249	198	+51	111
2	CE	y – St. Louis Blues	82	49	22	11	45	210	165	+45	109
3	PA	y – Phoenix Coyotes	82	42	27	13	36	216	204	+12	97
4	CE	x – Nashville Predators	82	48	26	8	43	237	210	+27	104
5	CE	x – Detroit Red Wings	82	48	28	6	39	248	203	+45	102
6	CE	x – Chicago Blackhawks	82	45	26	11	38	248	238	+10	101
7	PA	x – San Jose Sharks	82	43	29	10	34	228	210	+18	96
8	PA	x – Los Angeles Kings	82	40	27	15	34	194	179	+15	95
9	NW	Calgary Flames	82	37	29	16	34	202	226	−24	90
10	PA	Dallas Stars	82	42	35	5	35	211	222	−11	89
11	NW	Colorado Avalanche	82	41	35	6	32	208	220	−12	88
12	NW	Minnesota Wild	82	35	36	11	24	177	226	−49	81
13	PA	Anaheim Ducks	82	34	36	12	31	204	231	−27	80
14	NW	Edmonton Oilers	82	32	40	10	27	212	239	−27	74
15	CE	Columbus Blue Jackets	82	29	46	7	25	202	262	−60	65

Source: National Hockey League
p – Clinched Presidents' Trophy; x – Clinched playoff spot; y – Clinched division

== Schedule and results ==
=== Pre-season ===
2011 pre-season game log: 4–2–2 (Home: 1–1–0; Road: 3–0–1; Neutral: 0–1–1)
#	Date	Visitor	Score	Home	OT	Decision	Record	Recap
1	September 21	Los Angeles Kings (SS)	3–2	Phoenix Coyotes (SS)		Zatkoff (1–0–0)	1–0–0
2	September 21	Phoenix Coyotes (SS)	2–1	Los Angeles Kings (SS)	SO	Jones (0–0–1)	1–0–1
3	September 25	Anaheim Ducks	3–1	Los Angeles Kings		Quick (0–1–0)	1–1–1
4	September 27 (in Kansas City, MO)	Pittsburgh Penguins	3–2	Los Angeles Kings	SO	Bernier (0–0–1)	1–1–2
5	September 28	Los Angeles Kings	6–0	Colorado Avalanche		Quick (1–1–0)	2–1–2
6	September 30	Los Angeles Kings	3–1	Anaheim Ducks		Bernier (1–0–1)	3–1–2
7	October 1 (in Las Vegas, NV)	Colorado Avalanche	4–1	Los Angeles Kings		Quick (1–2–0)	3–2–2
8	October 4 (in Hamburg, Germany)	Los Angeles Kings	5–4	Hamburg Freezers		Bernier (2–0–1)	4–2–2
(SS) = Split-squad games.

=== Regular season ===
2011–12 game log

October: 6–3–2 (Home: 3–2–0; Road: 3–1–2)
#	Date	Visitor	Score	Home	OT	Decision	Attendance	Record	Pts	Recap
1	October 7 (in Stockholm, Sweden)	New York Rangers	2–3	Los Angeles Kings	OT	Quick (1–0–0)	13,800	1–0–0	2
2	October 8 (in Berlin, Germany)	Buffalo Sabres	4–2	Los Angeles Kings		Bernier (0–1–0)	14,300	1–1–0	2
3	October 13	Los Angeles Kings	1–2	New Jersey Devils	SO	Quick (1–0–1)	12,256	1–1–1	3
4	October 15	Los Angeles Kings	3–2	Philadelphia Flyers	OT	Quick (2–0–1)	19,644	2–1–1	5
5	October 18	St. Louis Blues	0–5	Los Angeles Kings		Quick (3–0–1)	18,118	3–1–1	7
6	October 20	Los Angeles Kings	2–0	Phoenix Coyotes		Quick (4–0–1)	7,128	4–1–1	9
7	October 22	Dallas Stars	0–1	Los Angeles Kings		Quick (5–0–1)	18,118	5–1–1	11
8	October 25	New Jersey Devils	3–0	Los Angeles Kings		Bernier (0–2–0)	18,118	5–2–1	11
9	October 27	Los Angeles Kings	5–3	Dallas Stars		Quick (6–0–1)	8,443	6–2–1	13
10	October 29	Los Angeles Kings	2–3	Phoenix Coyotes	OT	Quick (6–0–2)	10,379	6–2–2	14
11	October 30	Los Angeles Kings	2–3	Colorado Avalanche		Quick (6–1–2)	12,355	6–3–2	14

November: 6–5–2 (Home: 4–4–1; Road: 2–1–1)
#	Date	Visitor	Score	Home	OT	Decision	Attendance	Record	Pts	Recap
12	November 3	Edmonton Oilers	3–0	Los Angeles Kings		Quick (6–2–2)	18,118	6–4–2	14
13	November 5	Pittsburgh Penguins	3–2	Los Angeles Kings	SO	Quick (6–2–3)	18,118	6–4–3	15
14	November 7	Los Angeles Kings	2–4	San Jose Sharks		Quick (6–3–3)	17,562	6–5–3	15
15	November 8	Nashville Predators	3–4	Los Angeles Kings		Bernier (1–2–0)	17,963	7–5–3	17
16	November 10	Vancouver Canucks	3–2	Los Angeles Kings		Quick (6–4–3)	18,118	7–6–3	17
17	November 12	Minnesota Wild	2–5	Los Angeles Kings		Quick (7–4–3)	18,118	8–6–3	19
18	November 16	Anaheim Ducks	1–2	Los Angeles Kings	SO	Quick (8–4–3)	18,118	9–6–3	21
19	November 17	Los Angeles Kings	5–3	Anaheim Ducks		Quick (9–4–3)	15,412	10–6–3	23
20	November 19	Detroit Red Wings	4–1	Los Angeles Kings		Quick (9–5–3)	18,118	10–7–3	23
21	November 22	Los Angeles Kings	3–2	St. Louis Blues		Bernier (2–2–0)	18,178	11–7–3	25
22	November 23	Los Angeles Kings	2–3	Dallas Stars	OT	Quick (9–5–4)	11,779	11–7–4	26
23	November 26	Chicago Blackhawks	2–1	Los Angeles Kings		Quick (9–6–4)	18,118	11–8–4	26
24	November 28	San Jose Sharks	0–2	Los Angeles Kings		Quick (10–6–4)	18,118	12–8–4	28

December: 7–6–2 (Home: 4–3–0; Road: 3–3–2)
#	Date	Visitor	Score	Home	OT	Decision	Attendance	Record	Pts	Recap
25	December 1	Florida Panthers	1–2	Los Angeles Kings		Quick (11–6–4)	17,720	13–8–4	30
26	December 3	Montreal Canadiens	2–1	Los Angeles Kings		Bernier (2–3–0)	18,118	13–9–4	30
27	December 6	Los Angeles Kings	2–3	Anaheim Ducks		Quick (11–7–4)	14,419	13–10–4	30
28	December 8	Minnesota Wild	4–2	Los Angeles Kings		Quick (11–8–4)	18,118	13–11–4	30
29	December 10	Dallas Stars	2–1	Los Angeles Kings		Bernier (2–4–0)	18,118	13–12–4	30
30	December 13	Los Angeles Kings	0–3	Boston Bruins		Quick (11–9–4)	17,565	13–13–4	30
31	December 15	Los Angeles Kings	2–1	Columbus Blue Jackets		Quick (12–9–4)	16,090	14–13–4	32
32	December 17	Los Angeles Kings	2–8	Detroit Red Wings		Quick (12–10–4)	20,066	14–14–4	32
33	December 19	Los Angeles Kings	3–2	Toronto Maple Leafs	SO	Quick (13–10–4)	19,521	15–14–4	34
34	December 22	Anaheim Ducks	2–3	Los Angeles Kings	SO	Quick (14–10–4)	18,118	16–14–4	36
35	December 23	Los Angeles Kings	1–2	San Jose Sharks	SO	Quick (14–10–5)	17,562	16–14–5	37
36	December 26	Phoenix Coyotes	3–4	Los Angeles Kings		Quick (15–10–5)	18,118	17–14–5	39
37	December 28	Los Angeles Kings	2–0	Chicago Blackhawks		Quick (16–10–5)	22,066	18–14–5	41
38	December 29	Los Angeles Kings	0–1	Winnipeg Jets	OT	Bernier (2–4–1)	15,004	18–14–6	42
39	December 31	Vancouver Canucks	1–4	Los Angeles Kings		Quick (17–10–5)	18,118	19–14–6	44

January: 5–3–4 (Home: 4–2–3; Road: 1–1–1)
#	Date	Visitor	Score	Home	OT	Decision	Attendance	Record	Pts	Recap
40	January 2	Colorado Avalanche	2–1	Los Angeles Kings	SO	Quick (17–10–6)	18,118	19–14–7	45
41	January 5	Phoenix Coyotes	0–1	Los Angeles Kings	OT	Quick (18–10–6)	18,118	20–14–7	47
42	January 7	Columbus Blue Jackets	1–0	Los Angeles Kings		Quick (18–11–6)	18,118	20–15–7	47
43	January 9	Washington Capitals	2–5	Los Angeles Kings		Bernier (3–4–1)	18,118	21–15–7	49
44	January 12	Dallas Stars	5–4	Los Angeles Kings	SO	Quick (18–11–7)	18,118	21–15–8	50
45	January 14	Los Angeles Kings	4–1	Calgary Flames		Quick (19–11–7)	19,289	22–15–8	52
46	January 15	Los Angeles Kings	1–2	Edmonton Oilers	OT	Quick (19–11–8)	16,839	22–15–9	53
47	January 17	Los Angeles Kings	3–2	Vancouver Canucks	SO	Quick (20–11–8)	18,890	23–15–9	55
48	January 19	Calgary Flames	2–1	Los Angeles Kings	SO	Quick (20–11–9)	18,118	23–15–10	56
49	January 21	Colorado Avalanche	3–1	Los Angeles Kings		Quick (20–12–9)	18,118	23–16–10	56
50	January 23	Ottawa Senators	1–4	Los Angeles Kings		Quick (21–12–9)	18,118	24–16–10	58

February: 5–7–2 (Home: 2–2–0; Road: 3–5–2)
#	Date	Visitor	Score	Home	OT	Decision	Attendance	Record	Pts	Recap
51	February 1	Columbus Blue Jackets	2–3	Los Angeles Kings		Quick (22–12–9)	18,118	25–16–10	60
52	February 3	Los Angeles Kings	0–1	St. Louis Blues		Quick (22–13–9)	18,811	25–17–10	60
53	February 4	Los Angeles Kings	1–2	Carolina Hurricanes		Bernier (3–5–1)	18,680	25–18–10	60
54	February 7	Los Angeles Kings	3–1	Tampa Bay Lightning		Quick (23–13–9)	16,489	26–18–10	62
55	February 9	Los Angeles Kings	1–3	Florida Panthers		Quick (23–14–9)	14,929	26–19–10	62
56	February 11	Los Angeles Kings	1–2	New York Islanders	OT	Quick (23–14–10)	13,079	26–19–11	63
57	February 12	Los Angeles Kings	4–2	Dallas Stars		Quick (24–14–10)	12,191	27–19–11	65
58	February 16	Phoenix Coyotes	1–0	Los Angeles Kings		Quick (24–15–10)	18,118	27–20–11	65
59	February 18	Calgary Flames	1–0	Los Angeles Kings		Quick (24–16–10)	18,118	27–21–11	65
60	February 21	Los Angeles Kings	4–5	Phoenix Coyotes	SO	Quick (24–16–11)	10,842	27–21–12	66
61	February 22	Los Angeles Kings	1–4	Colorado Avalanche		Quick (24–17–11)	15,907	27–22–12	66
62	February 25	Chicago Blackhawks	0–4	Los Angeles Kings		Quick (25–17–11)	18,118	28–22–12	68
63	February 27	Los Angeles Kings	1–2	Nashville Predators		Quick (25–18–11)	15,665	28–23–12	68
64	February 28	Los Angeles Kings	4–0	Minnesota Wild		Bernier (4–5–1)	17,317	29–23–12	70

March: 10–4–1 (Home: 5–1–0; Road: 5–3–1)
#	Date	Visitor	Score	Home	OT	Decision	Attendance	Record	Pts	Recap
65	March 3	Anaheim Ducks	2–4	Los Angeles Kings		Quick (26–18–11)	18,301	30–23–12	72
66	March 6	Los Angeles Kings	5–4	Nashville Predators		Quick (27–18–11)	17,113	31–23–12	74
67	March 8	Los Angeles Kings	1–3	Columbus Blue Jackets		Bernier (4–6–1)	14,306	31–24–12	74
68	March 9	Los Angeles Kings	3–4	Detroit Red Wings		Quick (27–19–11)	20,066	31–25–12	74
69	March 11	Los Angeles Kings	3–2	Chicago Blackhawks	SO	Quick (28–19–11)	21,398	32–25–12	76
70	March 13	Detroit Red Wings	2–5	Los Angeles Kings		Quick (29–19–11)	18,118	33–25–12	78
71	March 16	Los Angeles Kings	4–2	Anaheim Ducks		Quick (30–19–11)	17,367	34–25–12	80
72	March 17	Nashville Predators	2–4	Los Angeles Kings		Bernier (5–6–1)	18,118	35–25–12	82
73	March 20	San Jose Sharks	2–5	Los Angeles Kings		Quick (31–19–11)	18,118	36–25–12	84
74	March 22	St. Louis Blues	0–1	Los Angeles Kings	SO	Quick (32–19–11)	18,118	37–25–12	86
75	March 24	Boston Bruins	4–2	Los Angeles Kings		Quick (32–20–11)	18,310	37–26–12	86
76	March 26	Los Angeles Kings	0–1	Vancouver Canucks		Quick (32–21–11)	18,890	37–27–12	86
77	March 28	Los Angeles Kings	3–0	Calgary Flames		Quick (33–21–11)	19,289	38–27–12	88
78	March 30	Los Angeles Kings	4–1	Edmonton Oilers		Quick (34–21–11)	16,839	39–27–12	90
79	March 31	Los Angeles Kings	3–4	Minnesota Wild	SO	Bernier (5–6–2)	18,209	39–27–13	91

April: 1–0–2 (Home: 1–0–1; Road: 0–0–1)
#	Date	Visitor	Score	Home	OT	Decision	Attendance	Record	Pts	Recap
80	April 2	Edmonton Oilers	0–2	Los Angeles Kings		Quick (35–21–11)	18,118	40–27–13	93
81	April 5	San Jose Sharks	6–5	Los Angeles Kings	SO	Quick (35–21–12)	18,330	40–27–14	94
82	April 7	Los Angeles Kings	2–3	San Jose Sharks	OT	Quick (35–21–13)	17,562	40–27–15	95

Legend: Win (2 points) Loss (0 points) Overtime/shootout loss (1 point)

=== Playoffs ===
2012 Stanley Cup Playoffs

Western Conference Quarterfinals: vs. (1) Vancouver Canucks – Los Angeles won series 4–1
#	Date	Visitor	Score	Home	OT	Decision	Attendance	Series	Recap
1	April 11	Los Angeles Kings	4–2	Vancouver Canucks		Quick (1–0)	18,890	1–0
2	April 13	Los Angeles Kings	4–2	Vancouver Canucks		Quick (2–0)	18,890	2–0
3	April 15	Vancouver Canucks	0–1	Los Angeles Kings		Quick (3–0)	18,352	3–0
4	April 18	Vancouver Canucks	3–1	Los Angeles Kings		Quick (3–1)	18,409	3–1
5	April 22	Los Angeles Kings	2–1	Vancouver Canucks	OT	Quick (4–1)	18,890	4–1

Western Conference Semifinals: vs. (2) St. Louis Blues – Los Angeles won series 4–0
#	Date	Visitor	Score	Home	OT	Decision	Attendance	Series	Recap
1	April 28	Los Angeles Kings	3–1	St. Louis Blues		Quick (5–1)	19,391	1–0
2	April 30	Los Angeles Kings	5–2	St. Louis Blues		Quick (6–1)	19,366	2–0
3	May 3	St. Louis Blues	2–4	Los Angeles Kings		Quick (7–1)	18,362	3–0
4	May 6	St. Louis Blues	1–3	Los Angeles Kings		Quick (8–1)	18,373	4–0

Western Conference Finals: vs. (3) Phoenix Coyotes – Los Angeles won series 4–1
#	Date	Visitor	Score	Home	OT	Decision	Attendance	Series	Recap
1	May 13	Los Angeles Kings	4–2	Phoenix Coyotes		Quick (9–1)	17,134	1–0
2	May 15	Los Angeles Kings	4–0	Phoenix Coyotes		Quick (10–1)	17,149	2–0
3	May 17	Phoenix Coyotes	1–2	Los Angeles Kings		Quick (11–1)	18,367	3–0
4	May 20	Phoenix Coyotes	2–0	Los Angeles Kings		Quick (11–2)	18,402	3–1
5	May 22	Los Angeles Kings	4–3	Phoenix Coyotes	OT	Quick (12–2)	17,148	4–1

Stanley Cup Final: vs (6) New Jersey Devils – Los Angeles won series 4–2
#	Date	Visitor	Score	Home	OT	Decision	Attendance	Series	Recap
1	May 30	Los Angeles Kings	2–1	New Jersey Devils	OT	Quick (13–2)	17,625	1–0
2	June 2	Los Angeles Kings	2–1	New Jersey Devils	OT	Quick (14–2)	17,625	2–0
3	June 4	New Jersey Devils	0–4	Los Angeles Kings		Quick (15–2)	18,764	3–0
4	June 6	New Jersey Devils	3–1	Los Angeles Kings		Quick (15–3)	18,867	3–1
5	June 9	Los Angeles Kings	1–2	New Jersey Devils		Quick (15–4)	17,625	3–2
6	June 11	New Jersey Devils	1–6	Los Angeles Kings		Quick (16-4)	18,858	4–2

Legend: Win Loss

== Player statistics ==
=== Skaters ===
Note: GP = Games played; G = Goals; A = Assists; Pts = Points; +/− = Plus/minus; PIM = Penalty minutes

Regular season									Playoffs					
#	Player	Pos.	GP	G	A	Pts	+/−	PIM	GP	G	A	Pts	+/−	PIM
11	Anze Kopitar	C	82	25	51	76	12	20	20	8	12	20	16	9
14	Justin Williams	RW	82	22	37	59	10	44	20	4	11	15	8	12
23	Dustin Brown	RW/LW	82	22	32	54	18	53	20	8	12	20	16	34
10	Mike Richards	C	74	18	26	44	3	71	20	4	11	15	1	17
8	Drew Doughty	D	77	10	26	36	-2	69	20	4	12	16	11	14
33	Willie Mitchell	D	76	5	19	24	20	44	20	1	2	3	7	16
3	Jack Johnson †	D	61	8	16	24	-12	24						
28	Jarret Stoll	C	78	6	15	21	2	60	20	2	3	5	5	18
26	Slava Voynov	D	54	8	12	20	12	12	20	1	2	3	1	4
12	Simon Gagne	LW	34	7	10	17	-1	18	4	0	0	0	-1	2
25	Dustin Penner	LW	65	7	10	17	-7	43	20	3	8	11	4	32
2	Matt Greene	D	82	4	11	15	4	58	20	2	4	6	9	12
74	Dwight King	LW	27	5	9	14	3	10	20	5	3	8	3	13
27	Alec Martinez	D	51	6	6	12	-1	8	20	1	2	3	5	8
13	Kyle Clifford	LW	81	5	7	12	-5	123	3	0	0	0	-1	2
7	Rob Scuderi	D	82	1	8	9	-7	16	20	0	1	1	9	4
77	Jeff Carter*	C/RW	16	6	3	9	-1	2	20	8	5	13	0	4
24	Colin Fraser	C	67	2	6	8	-2	67	18	1	1	2	-1	4
15	Brad Richardson	RW/LW/C	59	5	3	8	-6	30	13	1	0	1	0	4
47	Trent Hunter ‡	RW	38	2	5	7	-4	8						
22	Trevor Lewis	C/RW	72	3	4	7	-3	26	20	3	6	9	7	2
48	Andrei Loktionov	C	39	3	4	7	-4	2	2	0	0	0	0	0
17	Ethan Moreau ‡	LW	28	1	3	4	-3	20						
71	Jordan Nolan	C/RW	26	2	2	4	2	28	20	1	1	2	1	21
21	Scott Parse	RW	9	2	0	2	1	14	—	—	—	—	—	—
19	Kevin Westgarth	RW	25	1	1	2	-3	39	—	—	—	—	—	—
44	Davis Drewiske	D	9	2	0	2	0	2	—	—	—	—	—	—

- * Denotes player spent time with another team before joining Kings. Stats reflect time with the Kings only.
- † Traded mid-season.
- ‡ Waived by Kings. Did not later rejoin Kings that season.
- Bold/italics denotes franchise record.

=== Goaltenders ===
Note: Pos = Position;GP = Games played; Min, TOI = Minutes played; W = Wins; L = Losses; T,T/OT = Ties; OTL = Overtime losses; GA = Goals-against; GAA = Goals-against average; SO = Shutouts; SA = Shots against; SV = Shots saved; SV% = Save percentage;

Regular season
#	Player	GP	TOI	W	L	OTL	GA	GAA	SA	SV%	SO
32	Jonathan Quick	69	4099	35	21	13	133	1.95	1863	.929	10
45	Jonathan Bernier	16	890	5	6	2	35	2.36	383	.909	1

Playoffs
#	Player	GP	TOI	W	L	GA	GAA	SA	SV%	SO
32	Jonathan Quick	20	1238	16	4	29	1.41	538	.946	3

- * Denotes player spent time with another team before joining Kings. Stats reflect time with the Kings only.
- † Traded mid-season.
- ‡ Waived by Kings. Did not later rejoin Kings that season.
- Bold/italics denotes franchise record.

== Awards and records ==
=== Awards ===
Regular season
Player	Award	Awarded
Jonathan Quick	NHL First Star of the Week	October 24, 2011
Jonathan Quick	NHL Third Star of the Week	December 5, 2011
Jonathan Quick	NHL Third Star of the Week	January 2, 2012
Jonathan Quick	Conn Smythe Trophy	June 11, 2012
Los Angeles Kings	Best Upset ESPY Award	July 11, 2012
Jonathan Quick	Best NHL Player ESPY Award	July 11, 2012

=== Milestones ===
Regular season
Player	Milestone	Reached
Slava Voynov	1st career NHL game	October 18, 2011
Jonathan Quick	100th career NHL win	October 20, 2011
Anze Kopitar	400th career NHL game	October 22, 2011
Slava Voynov	1st career NHL goal 1st career NHL assist 1st career NHL point	October 27, 2011
Jarret Stoll	300th career NHL point	November 8, 2011
Jack Johnson	300th career NHL game	November 16, 2011
Trevor Lewis	100th career NHL game	November 16, 2011
Matt Greene	400th career NHL game	November 22, 2011
Kevin Westgarth	1st career NHL goal	November 23, 2011
Kyle Clifford	100th career NHL game	November 28, 2011
Jonathan Quick	200th career NHL game	November 28, 2011
Davis Drewiske	100th career NHL game	December 6, 2011
Trent Hunter	100th career NHL goal	December 8, 2011
Drew Doughty	100th career NHL assist	December 15, 2011
Rob Scuderi	500th career NHL game	January 14, 2012
Anze Kopitar	400th career NHL point	January 15, 2012
Mike Richards	500th career NHL game	February 9, 2012
Jordan Nolan	1st career NHL game	February 11, 2012
Dwight King	1st career NHL goal 1st career NHL assist 1st career NHL point	February 12, 2012
Jordan Nolan	1st career NHL goal 1st career NHL point	February 12, 2012
Willie Mitchell	700th career NHL game	February 28, 2012
Drew Doughty	300th career NHL game	March 8, 2012
Alec Martinez	100th career NHL game	March 9, 2012

Playoffs
Player	Milestone	Reached
Dwight King	1st career NHL playoff game	April 11, 2012
Jordan Nolan	1st career NHL playoff game	April 11, 2012
Slava Voynov	1st career NHL playoff game	April 11, 2012
Andrei Loktionov	1st career NHL playoff game	April 13, 2012
Jeff Carter	50th career NHL playoff game	April 18, 2012
Slava Voynov	1st career NHL playoff goal 1st career NHL playoff point	April 28, 2012
Matt Greene	1st career NHL playoff goal	April 28, 2012
Jon Quick	10th career NHL playoff win	April 28, 2012
Dwight King	1st career NHL playoff goal 1st career NHL playoff point	May 3, 2012
Jordan Nolan	1st career NHL playoff goal 1st career NHL playoff point	May 6, 2012
Dustin Penner	50th career NHL playoff game	May 13, 2012
Mike Richards	75th career NHL playoff game	May 17, 2012
Rob Scuderi	75th career NHL playoff game	May 22, 2012
Jarret Stoll	50th career NHL playoff game	May 30, 2012
Colin Fraser	1st career NHL playoff goal	May 30, 2012
Alec Martinez	1st career NHL playoff goal	June 4, 2012

== Transactions ==
The Kings have been involved in the following transactions during the 2011–12 season.

=== Trades ===
Date	Details
June 23, 2011	To Philadelphia Flyers Brayden Schenn; Wayne Simmonds; 2nd-round pick in 2012	To Los Angeles Kings Rob Bordson; Mike Richards
June 25, 2011	To Nashville Predators 6th-round pick in 2011; 3rd-round pick in 2012	To Los Angeles Kings 3rd-round pick in 2011
June 26, 2011	To Edmonton Oilers Ryan Smyth	To Los Angeles Kings Colin Fraser; 7th-round pick in 2012
October 12, 2011	To Philadelphia Flyers Future considerations	To Los Angeles Kings Stefan Legein; 6th-round pick in 2012
February 23, 2012	To Columbus Blue Jackets Jack Johnson; Conditional 1st-round pick in 2012 or 2013 (Note: Columbus Blue Jackets elected to receive 1st-round pick in 2012.)	To Los Angeles Kings Jeff Carter

=== Free agents acquired ===
Player	Former team	Contract terms
Simon Gagne	Tampa Bay Lightning	2 years, $7 million
Ethan Moreau	Columbus Blue Jackets	1 year, $600,000
Cam Paddock	Iserlohn Roosters	1 year, $525,000
Alex Roach	Calgary Hitmen	3 years, $1.655 million entry-level contract
Trent Hunter	New Jersey Devils	1 year, $600,000
Brian O'Neill	Yale University	1 year, $642,500 entry-level contract

=== Free agents lost ===
Player	New team	Contract terms
Oscar Moller	Skelleftea AIK	2 years
Michal Handzus	San Jose Sharks	2 years, $5 million
Alexei Ponikarovsky	Carolina Hurricanes	1 year, $1.5 million
Corey Elkins	HC Pardubice	1 year
Bud Holloway	Skelleftea AIK	1 year
Peter Harrold	New Jersey Devils	1 year, $550,000
John Zeiler	Augsburger Panther	1 year

=== Acquired via waivers ===
Player	Former team	Date claimed off waivers

=== Lost via waivers ===
Player	New team	Date claimed off waivers

=== Player signings ===
Player	Date	Contract terms
Jean-Francois Berube	May 23, 2011	3 years, $1.62 million entry-level contract
Linden Vey	May 23, 2011	3 years, $2.37 million entry-level contract
Nicolas Deslauriers	May 31, 2011	3 years, $1.825 million entry-level contract
Alec Martinez	July 8, 2011	2 years, $1.475 million
Brad Richardson	July 13, 2011	2 years, $2.35 million
Trevor Lewis	July 15, 2011	2 years, $1.45 million
Marc-Andre Cliche	July 15, 2011	1 year, $525,000
Richard Clune	July 15, 2011	1 year, $605,000
David Meckler	July 15, 2011	1 year, $577,500
Andrew Campbell	July 15, 2011	1 year, $577,500
Patrick Mullen	July 15, 2011	1 year, $632,500
Jeff Zatkoff	July 15, 2011	1 year, $577,500
Kevin Westgarth	September 19, 2011	2 years, $1.45 million contract extension
Drew Doughty	September 30, 2011	8 years, $56 million
Andy Andreoff	October 12, 2011	3 years, $1.755 million entry-level contract
Robert Czarnik	October 12, 2011	3 years, $1.67 million entry-level contract
Willie Mitchell	February 24, 2012	2 years, $7 million contract extension

== Draft picks ==
LA 's picks at the 2011 NHL entry draft in St. Paul, Minnesota.

Round	#	Player	Position	Nationality	College/junior/club team (league)
2	49	Christopher Gibson	G	Finland	Chicoutimi Sagueneens (QMJHL)
3	80	Andy Andreoff	C	Canada	Oshawa Generals (OHL)
3	82 (from Nashville)	Nick Shore	C	United States	University of Denver (WCHA)
4	110	Michael Mersch	LW	United States	University of Wisconsin (WCHA)
5	140	Joel Lowry	LW	Canada	Victoria Grizzlies (BCHL)
7	200	Michael Schumacher	LW	Sweden	Frolunda HC Jr. (J20 SuperElit)

== Farm teams ==
=== Manchester Monarchs (AHL) ===
The 2011–12 season will be the 11th season of AHL hockey for the franchise. The Monarchs clinched a playoff berth as the 8th seed in the Eastern Conference in the 2012 Calder Cup Playoffs and faced the Norfolk Admirals, where they were defeated 3 games to 1.

=== Ontario Reign (ECHL) ===
The 2011–12 season will be the fourth season of ECHL hockey for the franchise since moving to Ontario from Texas. It saw the Reign capture their second Pacific Division Regular Season championship and their second playoff berth. However, the Reign lost to the Idaho Steelheads in the first round of the 2012 Kelly Cup playoffs. The Reign have never advanced past the first round in their franchise history.
