= Brett MacLean =

Canadian ice hockey player and coach

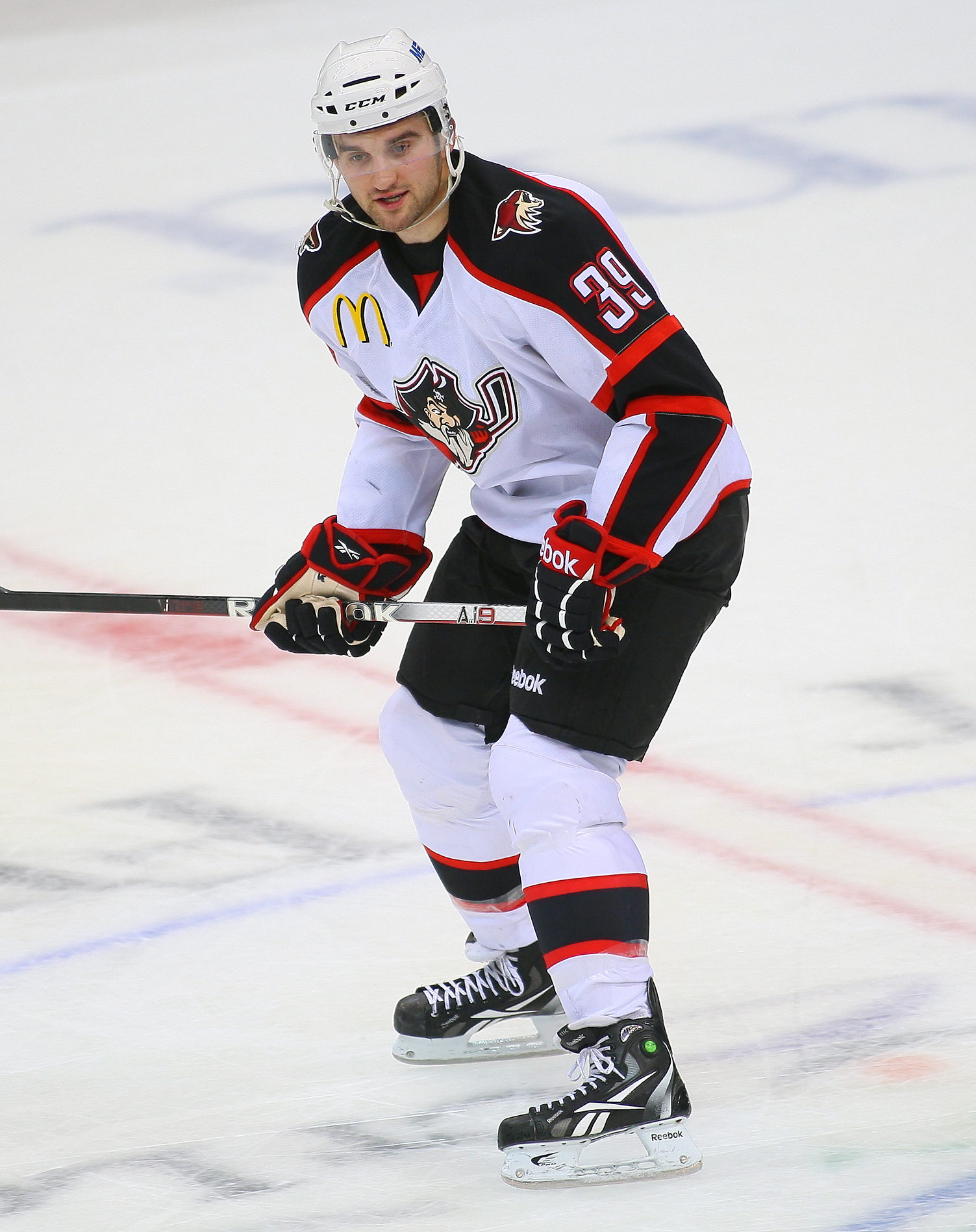
- MacLean with the Portland Pirates in 2012
- Born: December 24, 1988 (age 37) London, Ontario, Canada
- Height: 6 ft 1 in (185 cm)
- Weight: 200 lb (91 kg; 14 st 4 lb)
- Position: Left wing
- Shot: Right
- Played for: Phoenix Coyotes; Winnipeg Jets
- NHL draft: 32nd overall, 2007; Phoenix Coyotes
- Playing career: 2008–2012

Brett MacLean (born December 24, 1988) is a Canadian former professional ice hockey player who played for the Phoenix Coyotes and Winnipeg Jets in the National Hockey League. He was drafted 32nd overall by the Coyotes in the 2007 NHL entry draft. He is currently an assistant coach with the University of Waterloo men's hockey team.

== Playing career ==
MacLean grew up in the small town of Port Elgin, Ontario playing minor hockey for his hometown Port Elgin and the Grey-Bruce Highlanders AAA of the OMHA. After leading his Highlanders to an OHL Cup Semi-Final appearance in 2004, MacLean was drafted in the 1st round (11th overall) of the 2004 OHL Draft by the Erie Otters.

MacLean was drafted 32nd overall, in the 2nd round of the 2007 NHL entry draft by the Phoenix Coyotes. Brett was drafted from the Ontario Hockey League, where he played with the Erie Otters and the Oshawa Generals.

On 28 April 2008 he was signed by the Phoenix Coyotes to a two-way deal with the San Antonio Rampage which was then the Coyotes' AHL affiliate.

On December 29, 2010, Maclean was called up to the NHL by the Phoenix Coyotes, and scored a goal in his first NHL period against Jonathan Quick of the Los Angeles Kings later that night.

On October 5, 2011, Maclean was placed on waivers by the Phoenix Coyotes, and was claimed by the Winnipeg Jets. On October 28, 2011, MacLean was again waived, and reclaimed by the Coyotes; he was then assigned to the Coyotes' new AHL affiliate team, the Portland Pirates.

== Heart condition ==
On July 2, 2012, MacLean suffered a cardiac emergency while playing hockey with friends in Owen Sound, Ontario. He was revived using cardiopulmonary resuscitation and a defibrillator. He subsequently had a defibrillator implanted and was forced to retire from hockey. MacLean is actively campaigning for CPR awareness with the Heart and Stroke Foundation.

== Career statistics ==
			Regular season					Playoffs
Season	Team	League	GP	G	A	Pts	PIM	GP	G	A	Pts	PIM
2003–04	Listowel Cyclones	MWJHL	9	4	6	10	10	2	3	2	5	12
2003–04	Grey-Bruce Highlanders	OMHA	59	61	41	102	95	—	—	—	—	—
2004–05	Erie Otters	OHL	68	7	16	23	31	6	1	1	2	6
2005–06	Erie Otters	OHL	13	3	5	8	6	—	—	—	—	—
2005–06	Oshawa Generals	OHL	35	13	25	38	29	—	—	—	—	—
2006–07	Oshawa Generals	OHL	68	47	53	100	43	7	6	9	15	9
2007–08	Oshawa Generals	OHL	61	61	58	119	42	15	5	11	16	12
2008–09	San Antonio Rampage	AHL	74	21	19	40	33	—	—	—	—	—
2009–10	San Antonio Rampage	AHL	76	30	35	65	43	—	—	—	—	—
2010–11	San Antonio Rampage	AHL	51	23	27	50	28	—	—	—	—	—
2010–11	Phoenix Coyotes	NHL	13	2	1	3	2	—	—	—	—	—
2011–12	Winnipeg Jets	NHL	5	0	2	2	2	—	—	—	—	—
2011–12	Portland Pirates	AHL	63	25	23	48	45	—	—	—	—	—
AHL totals			264	99	104	203	149	-	—	—	—	—
NHL totals			18	2	3	5	4	—	—	—	—	—

== Awards and honours ==
Award	Year
OHL
Second all-star team	2007
CHL Top Prospects Game	2007
First All-Star Team	2008
CHL Second All-Star Team	2008
Most Goals (61)	2008
AHL
All-Star Game	2009, 2011
AHL Player of the Month	December 2011
