= Randy Jones (ice hockey) =

Canadian ice hockey player (born 1981)

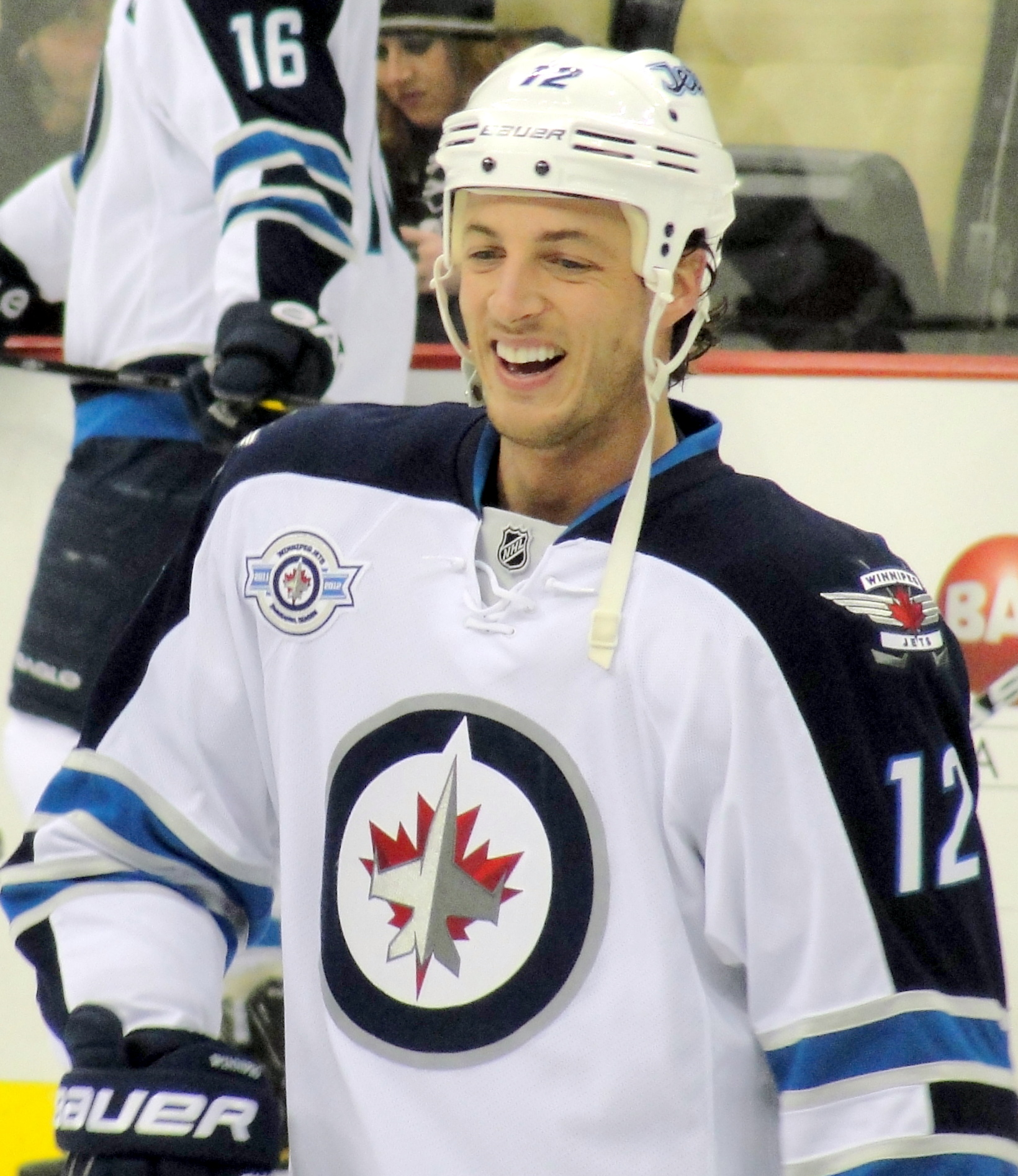
- Jones with the Jets in 2012.
- Born: July 23, 1981 (age 45) Saint John, New Brunswick, Canada
- Height: 6 ft 2 in (188 cm)
- Weight: 210 lb (95 kg; 15 st 0 lb)
- Position: Defence
- Shot: Left
- Played for: Philadelphia Flyers; Los Angeles Kings; Tampa Bay Lightning; Winnipeg Jets
- NHL draft: Undrafted
- Playing career: 2003–2014

Randy Jones (born July 23, 1981) is a Canadian former professional ice hockey player who played eight seasons in the National Hockey League (NHL) with the Philadelphia Flyers, Los Angeles Kings, Tampa Bay Lightning and Winnipeg Jets. Jones is currently the head coach of the Brockville Braves hockey club.

== Playing career ==
Jones played junior hockey with the Cobourg Cougars of the Ontario Provincial Junior A Hockey League. He played for Clarkson University in the NCAA from 2001 through 2003. On July 24, 2003, he was signed to a contract as a free agent by the Philadelphia Flyers. Jones eased his way into the Flyers lineup, spending most of his first season with their American Hockey League affiliate, the Philadelphia Phantoms. He played with the Phantoms through the 2004–05 NHL lockout, and the next season, he split games between the Phantoms and the Flyers. He played 66 games in the 2006–07 NHL season, and started the 2007–08 NHL season with the Flyers.

On October 27, 2007, he boarded Patrice Bergeron of the Boston Bruins. Bergeron was knocked unconscious and wheeled off on a stretcher, and then sent to the hospital. Jones was assessed a five-minute boarding major and a game misconduct. He issued an apology during the second period of the game. On October 29, it was announced that he had been suspended two games as a result of the hit. On the ruling, NHL Senior Executive Vice President of Hockey Operations Colin Campbell said, "While it is my determination that Jones did not intend to injure his opponent, he did deliver a hard check to a player who was in a vulnerable position." Bergeron did not play for the remainder of the season.

On July 2, 2008, the Flyers announced that they signed Jones to a two-year contract extension. On September 26, 2009, the Flyers announced that they had placed Jones on waivers in order to clear up space under the salary cap. He cleared waivers and was assigned to the Adirondack Phantoms on September 30. On October 29, 2009, Jones was claimed off re-entry waivers by the Los Angeles Kings.

After becoming an unrestricted free agent, Jones signed a one-year deal with the Tampa Bay Lightning on August 25, 2010. The following season he signed a one-year contract worth $1.15 million with the Winnipeg Jets on July 2, 2011. Jones endured the NHL lockout as a free agent, and with a lack of NHL interest he was belatedly signed midway in to the 2012–13 season to a try-out with the Oklahoma City Barons of the AHL on February 3, 2013.

On October 28, 2013, the Portland Pirates of the AHL signed Jones to a professional tryout contract (PTO).

== Career statistics ==
			Regular season					Playoffs
Season	Team	League	GP	G	A	Pts	PIM	GP	G	A	Pts	PIM
2001–02	Clarkson Golden Knights	ECAC	34	9	11	20	32	—	—	—	—	—
2002–03	Clarkson Golden Knights	ECAC	33	13	20	33	65	—	—	—	—	—
2003–04	Philadelphia Phantoms	AHL	55	8	24	32	63	12	0	1	1	17
2003–04	Philadelphia Flyers	NHL	5	0	0	0	0	—	—	—	—	—
2004–05	Philadelphia Phantoms	AHL	69	5	19	24	32	18	0	5	5	10
2005–06	Philadelphia Phantoms	AHL	21	2	3	5	53	—	—	—	—	—
2005–06	Philadelphia Flyers	NHL	28	0	8	8	16	—	—	—	—	—
2006–07	Philadelphia Flyers	NHL	66	4	18	22	38	—	—	—	—	—
2007–08	Philadelphia Flyers	NHL	71	5	26	31	58	16	0	2	2	4
2008–09	Philadelphia Phantoms	AHL	2	0	2	2	0	—	—	—	—	—
2008–09	Philadelphia Flyers	NHL	47	4	4	8	22	6	0	1	1	0
2009–10	Adirondack Phantoms	AHL	6	0	1	1	6	—	—	—	—	—
2009–10	Los Angeles Kings	NHL	48	5	16	21	28	4	0	0	0	2
2010–11	Tampa Bay Lightning	NHL	61	1	12	13	15	5	0	1	1	2
2011–12	Winnipeg Jets	NHL	39	1	1	2	8	—	—	—	—	—
2012–13	Oklahoma City Barons	AHL	18	0	2	2	31	17	1	4	5	6
2013–14	Portland Pirates	AHL	50	3	19	22	19	—	—	—	—	—
NHL totals			365	20	85	105	185	31	0	4	4	8

== Awards and honors ==
Award	Year
All-ECAC Hockey Rookie Team	2001–02
All-ECAC Hockey First Team	2002–03
AHL Calder Cup	2004–05
