= 2011–12 Florida Panthers season =

National Hockey League team season

2011–12 Florida Panthers
- Southeast Division champions
- Division: 1st Southeast
- Conference: 3rd Eastern
- 2011–12 record: 38–26–18
- Home record: 21–9–11
- Road record: 17–17–7
- Goals for: 202
- Goals against: 222

Team information
- General manager: Dale Tallon
- Coach: Kevin Dineen
- Captain: Vacant
- Alternate captains: Brian Campbell; Ed Jovanovski; Tomas Kopecky; Stephen Weiss
- Arena: BankAtlantic Center
- Average attendance: 16,628 (86.3%) Total: 681,763

Team leaders
- Goals: Tomas Fleischmann (27)
- Assists: Brian Campbell (49)
- Points: Tomas Fleischmann (61)
- Penalty minutes: Krystofer Barch (91)
- Plus/minus: Jason Garrison (+6)
- Wins: Jose Theodore (22)
- Goals against average: Jose Theodore (2.46)

The 2011–12 Florida Panthers season was the 18th season for the National Hockey League (NHL) franchise that was established on June 14, 1993.

The Panthers qualified for the Stanley Cup playoffs for the first time in 12 years after their previous playoff appearance in 2000, and also won their division for the first time. However, the Panthers could not further their progress, losing in the opening round to the New Jersey Devils, who would go on to be the Stanley Cup runner-up. The Panthers had a 3–2 lead in the series before losing Games 6 and 7 (both in overtime) to be eliminated from the playoffs.

== Off-season ==
On June 1, 2011, the Panthers introduced their new head coach, former NHL player Kevin Dineen. Dineen had spent the previous six seasons coaching the Portland Pirates of the American Hockey League (AHL).

== Regular season ==
See the game log below for detailed game-by-game season information.

The Panthers had their first quality season in over a decade in 2011–12, having never finished above third place in the Southeast Division since 1999–2000. Despite losing more games than they won, competition for the Panthers within the Division was not fierce, and the team was in third place in the Eastern Conference as the Southeast Division leader throughout much of the season. Although the Panthers amassed more losses than wins, 18 of these losses were in overtime or a shootout (the highest number of any team in the NHL for the 2011–12 season), meaning Florida often gained a point even when they failed to win.

== Playoffs ==
The Panthers clinched a playoff berth on April 5, 2012, securing the return of playoff hockey to South Florida for the first time in 12 years. The third-seeded Panthers had home ice advantage by virtue of winning their division, despite the sixth-seeded New Jersey Devils besting them in regular season point totals (102 to 94). The Devils won the first game of the series, but the Panthers bounced back with a win in Game 2 to even the series as it headed to New Jersey. The Panthers would return the favor by winning Game 3, 4–3, but the Devils recorded a shutout in Game 4, 4–0. The Panthers returned home to play Game 5 and were one win away from winning their first post-season series since 1996 after notching a shutout of their own, 3–0. The series went back to New Jersey for the final time of the series, with the home team tying the series after winning Game 6 in overtime, the first extra period of the series. The seventh and deciding game went even longer than Game 6 after the Panthers managed to score two power-play goals in the third period to force overtime. The game—and series—was still even after the completion of one extra period. Less than four minutes into the second overtime, the first shot on goal by either team was recorded by Devils rookie center Adam Henrique and notched his second goal of the game and deciding goal of the series, eliminating the Panthers from the playoffs, 3–2.

== Standings ==
Southeast Division
Pos	Team	GP	W	L	OTL	ROW	GF	GA	GD	Pts
1	y – Florida Panthers	82	38	26	18	32	203	227	−24	94
2	x – Washington Capitals	82	42	32	8	38	222	230	−8	92
3	Tampa Bay Lightning	82	38	36	8	35	235	281	−46	84
4	Winnipeg Jets	82	37	35	10	33	225	246	−21	84
5	Carolina Hurricanes	82	33	33	16	32	213	243	−30	82

Source: National Hockey League
x – Clinched playoff spot; y – Clinched division

Eastern Conference
Pos	Div	Team	GP	W	L	OTL	ROW	GF	GA	GD	Pts
1	AT	z – New York Rangers	82	51	24	7	47	226	187	+39	109
2	NE	y – Boston Bruins	82	49	29	4	40	269	202	+67	102
3	SE	y – Florida Panthers	82	38	26	18	32	203	227	−24	94
4	AT	x – Pittsburgh Penguins	82	51	25	6	42	282	221	+61	108
5	AT	x – Philadelphia Flyers	82	47	26	9	43	264	232	+32	103
6	AT	x – New Jersey Devils	82	48	28	6	36	228	209	+19	102
7	SE	x – Washington Capitals	82	42	32	8	38	222	230	−8	92
8	NE	x – Ottawa Senators	82	41	31	10	35	249	240	+9	92
9	NE	Buffalo Sabres	82	39	32	11	32	218	230	−12	89
10	SE	Tampa Bay Lightning	82	38	36	8	35	235	281	−46	84
11	SE	Winnipeg Jets	82	37	35	10	33	225	246	−21	84
12	SE	Carolina Hurricanes	82	33	33	16	32	213	243	−30	82
13	NE	Toronto Maple Leafs	82	35	37	10	31	231	264	−33	80
14	AT	New York Islanders	82	34	37	11	27	203	255	−52	79
15	NE	Montreal Canadiens	82	31	35	16	26	212	226	−14	78

Source: National Hockey League
x – Clinched playoff spot; y – Clinched division; z – Clinched conference

== Schedule and results ==
=== Pre-season ===
2011 Pre-season game log: 1–5–0 (Home: 1–3–0; Road: 0–2–0)
#	**Date**	**Visitor**	**Score**	**Home**	**OT**	**Decision**	**Record**	**Recap**
1	September 19 (split-squad)	Nashville Predators	5–3	Florida Panthers		Foster	0–1–0
2	September 19 (split-squad)	Nashville Predators	3–4	Florida Panthers		Clemmensen	1–1–0
3	September 23	Florida Panthers	2–5	Tampa Bay Lightning		Markstrom	1–2–0
4	September 24	Tampa Bay Lightning	5–3	Florida Panthers		Theodore	1–3–0
5	September 27	Dallas Stars	4–3	Florida Panthers	OT	Plante	1–4–0
6	September 29	Florida Panthers	7–1	Dallas Stars		Theodore	1–5–0

=== Regular season ===
Legend
Panthers Win	Panthers Regulation Loss	Panthers OT/Shootout Loss	ASG
Boldface text denotes a Panthers goalie

2011–12 Game Log

October 2011: 6–4–1 (Home: 2–1–1; Road: 4–3–0)
#	**Date**	**Opponent**	**Score**	**OT**	**Win**	**Loss**	**Attn.**	**Record**	**Pts**	**Recap**
1	October 8	@ New York Islanders	2–0		**Theodore** (1–0–0)	Montoya (0–1–0)	16,234	1–0–0	2	Recap
2	October 11	@ Pittsburgh Penguins	4–2		Fleury (3–0–0)	**Theodore** (1–1–0)	18,503	1–1–0	2	Recap
3	October 15	Tampa Bay Lightning	3–2	SO	**Theodore** (2–1–0)	Garon (0–1–1)	18,352	2–1–0	4	Recap
4	October 17	@ Tampa Bay Lightning	7–4		**Theodore** (3–1–0)	Roloson (1–2–1)	19,204	3–1–0	6	Recap
5	October 18	@ Washington Capitals	3–0		Vokoun (4–0–0)	**Markstrom** (0–1–0)	18,506	3–2–0	6	Recap
6	October 20	Buffalo Sabres	3–0		Miller (4–1–0)	**Theodore** (3–2–0)	14,811	3–3–0	6	Recap
7	October 22	New York Islanders	4–2		**Markstrom** (1–1–0)	Nabokov (1–1–0)	15,411	4–3–0	8	Recap
8	October 24	@ Montreal Canadiens	2–1		**Markstrom** (2–1–0)	Budaj (0–1–0)	21,273	5–3–0	10	Recap
9	October 27	@ Ottawa Senators	4–3		Anderson (5–2–0)	**Markstrom** (2–2–0)	18,165	5–4–0	10	Recap
10	October 29	@ Buffalo Sabres	3–2		**Theodore** (4–2–0)	Miller (4–4–0)	18,690	6–4–0	12	Recap
11	October 31	Winnipeg Jets	4–3	SO	Pavelec (3–4–1)	**Theodore** (4–2–1)	11,855	6–4–1	13	Recap

November 2011: 7–3–3 (Home: 3–1–3; Road: 4–2–0)
#	**Date**	**Opponent**	**Score**	**OT**	**Win**	**Loss**	**Attn.**	**Record**	**Pts**	**Recap**
12	November 3	Chicago Blackhawks	3–2	SO	Crawford (6–2–2)	**Markstrom** (2–2–1)	15,929	6–4–2	14	Recap
13	November 6	Tampa Bay Lightning	4–3	SO	Roloson (4–3–1)	**Theodore** (4–2–2)	15,066	6–4–3	15	Recap
14	November 8	@ Toronto Maple Leafs	5–1		**Theodore** (5–2–2)	Gustavsson (4–4–0)	19,414	7–4–3	17	Recap
15	November 10	@ Winnipeg Jets	5–2		**Theodore** (6–2–2)	Pavelec (4–6–3)	15,004	8–4–3	19	Recap
16	November 13	Philadelphia Flyers	3–2		Bryzgalov (7–4–2)	**Theodore** (6–3–2)	15,215	8–5–3	19	Recap
17	November 15	@ Dallas Stars	6–0		**Clemmensen** (1–0–0)	Lehtonen (11–3–0)	10,175	9–5–3	21	Recap
18	November 17	@ St. Louis Blues	4–1		Halak (3–6–1)	**Theodore** (6–4–2)	17,642	9–6–3	21	Recap
19	November 19	Pittsburgh Penguins	3–2		**Theodore** (7–4–2)	Johnson (1–3–2)	18,071	10–6–3	23	Recap
20	November 21	New Jersey Devils	4–3		**Theodore** (8–4–2)	Brodeur(4–4–0)	13,112	11–6–3	25	Recap
21	November 23	New York Rangers	2–1		**Theodore** (9–4–2)	Lundqvist (7–4–3)	17,461	12–6–3	27	Recap
22	November 25	Tampa Bay Lightning	2–1	OT	Garon (4–3–1)	**Theodore** (9–4–3)	17,380	12–6–4	28	Recap
23	November 26	@ Tampa Bay Lightning	5–1		Garon (5–3–1)	**Markstrom** (2–3–1)	17,841	12–7–4	28	Recap
24	November 29	@ Carolina Hurricanes	3–1		**Theodore** (10–4–3)	Ward (8–11–3)	13,065	13–7–4	30	Recap

December 2011: 7–5–3 (Home: 5–2–1; Road: 2–3–2)
#	**Date**	**Opponent**	**Score**	**OT**	**Win**	**Loss**	**Attn.**	**Record**	**Pts**	**Recap**
25	December 1	@ Los Angeles Kings	2–1		Quick (11–6–4)	**Theodore** (10–5–3)	17,720	13–8–4	30	Recap
26	December 3	@ San Jose Sharks	5–3		**Clemmensen** (2–0–0)	Greiss (4–4–0)	17,562	14–8–4	32	Recap
27	December 5	Washington Capitals	5–4		**Clemmensen** (3–0–0)	Neuvirth (3–5–1)	16,337	15–8–4	34	Recap
28	December 8	@ Boston Bruins	2–0		**Theodore** (11–5–3)	Thomas (13–5–0)	17,565	16–8–4	36	Recap
29	December 9	@ Buffalo Sabres	2–1	OT	Miller (7–6–1)	**Clemmensen** (3–0–1)	18,690	16–8–5	37	Recap
30	December 11	@ New York Rangers	6–1		Lundqvist (12–4–4)	**Theodore** (11–6–3)	18,200	16–9–5	37	Recap
31	December 13	New Jersey Devils	3–2	SO	Brodeur (7–8–0)	**Theodore** (11–6–4)	14,669	16–9–6	38	Recap
32	December 16	Calgary Flames	3–2	SO	**Theodore** (12–6–4)	Irving (0–0–1)	15,575	17–9–6	40	Recap
33	December 18	Carolina Hurricanes	3–2	OT	**Theodore** (13–6–4)	Ward (10–13–5)	15,289	18–9–6	42	Recap
34	December 20	Phoenix Coyotes	2–1		Smith (15–10–3)	**Theodore** (13–7–4)	17,711	18–10–6	42	Recap
35	December 22	@ Ottawa Senators	4–3	OT	Anderson (15–11–2)	**Clemmensen** (3–0–2)	19,296	18–10–7	43	Recap
36	December 23	@ Boston Bruins	8–0		Rask (6–4–1)	**Theodore** (13–8–4)	17,565	18–11–7	43	Recap
37	December 27	Toronto Maple Leafs	5–3		**Theodore** (14–8–4)	Gustavsson (9–6–0)	20,406	19–11–7	45	Recap
38	December 30	New York Rangers	4–1		Lundqvist (16–7–4)	**Clemmensen** (3–1–2)	20,238	19–12–7	45	Recap
39	December 31	Montreal Canadiens	3–2		**Clemmensen** (4–1–2)	Price (13–14–7)	20,098	20–12–7	47	Recap

January 2012: 2–3–4 (Home: 1–1–2; Road: 1–2–2)
#	**Date**	**Opponent**	**Score**	**OT**	**Win**	**Loss**	**Attn.**	**Record**	**Pts**	**Recap**
40	January 5	@ New York Rangers	3–2	OT	Biron (7–2–0)	**Clemmensen** (4–1–3)	18,200	20–12–8	48	Recap
41	January 6	@ New Jersey Devils	5–2		Hedberg (11–6–1)	**Markstrom** (2–4–1)	15,793	20–13–8	48	Recap
42	January 9	Vancouver Canucks	2–1		**Clemmensen** (5–1–3)	Luongo (17–9–3)	16,712	21–13–8	50	Recap
43	January 13	Pittsburgh Penguins	4–1		Fleury (20–12–2)	**Clemmensen** (5–2–3)	18,658	21–14–8	50	Recap
44	January 16	Boston Bruins	3–2	SO	Rask (11–4–1)	**Clemmensen** (5–2–4)	19,018	21–14–9	51	Recap
45	January 18	@ Colorado Avalanche	4–3	OT	Giguere (10–6–1)	**Theodore** (14–8–5)	13,465	21–14–10	52	Recap
46	January 20	@ Chicago Blackhawks	3–1		Emery (11–3–2)	**Theodore** (14–9–5)	21,555	21–15–10	52	Recap
47	January 21	@ Winnipeg Jets	4–3	SO	**Clemmensen** (6–2–4)	Pavelec (16–16–6)	15,004	22–15–10	54	Recap
48	January 24	Philadelphia Flyers	3–2	SO	Bobrovsky (11–4–1)	**Clemmensen** (6–2–5)	17,737	22–15–11	55	Recap
ASG	January 28	SuperSkills	Fastest Skater: Hagelin (N.Y. Rangers); Breakaway Challenge: Kane (Chicago); Accuracy Shooting: Benn (Dallas); Challenge Relay: Tm. Alfredsson wins, 3–0; Hardest Shot: Chara (Boston); Elimination Shootout: Tm. Alfredsson wins, 10–3; Overall: Tm. Alfredsson wins, 21–12						Scotiabank Place– Ottawa, Ontario
ASG	January 29	Tm. Chara vs. Tm. Alfredsson	12–9; Tm. Chara		Tim Thomas (BOS)	Brian Elliott (STL)	20,510	Scotiabank Place		Ottawa, Ontario

February 2012: 8–5–1 (Home: 4–3–1; Road: 4–2–0)
#	**Date**	**Opponent**	**Score**	**OT**	**Win**	**Loss**	**Attn.**	**Record**	**Pts**	**Recap**
49	February 1	Washington Capitals	4–2		**Clemmensen** (7–2–5)	Neuvirth (6–8–3)	15,231	23–15–11	57	Recap
50	February 3	Winnipeg Jets	2–1		**Clemmensen** (8–2–5)	Mason (6–6–0)	16,773	24–15–11	59	Recap
51	February 4	@ Tampa Bay Lightning	6–3		Garon (16–13–3)	**Clemmensen** (8–3–5)	19,204	24–16–11	59	Recap
52	February 7	@ Washington Capitals	4–0		Vokoun (22–13–1)	**Clemmensen** (8–4–5)	18,506	24–17–11	59	Recap
53	February 9	Los Angeles Kings	3–1		**Clemmensen** (9–4–5)	Quick (23–14–9)	14,929	25–17–11	61	Recap
54	February 11	@ New Jersey Devils	3–1		**Clemmensen** (10–4–5)	Brodeur (18–13–2)	14,938	26–17–11	63	Recap
55	February 12	@ New York Islanders	4–1		**Theodore** (15–9–5)	Nabokov (13–14–0)	14,179	27–17–11	65	Recap
56	February 15	Ottawa Senators	6–2		Anderson (27–19–6)	**Clemmensen** (10–5–5)	14,038	27–18–11	65	Recap
57	February 17	Washington Capitals	2–1		Vokoun (23–13–2)	**Theodore** (15–10–5)	17,779	27–19–11	65	Recap
58	February 19	Anaheim Ducks	2–0		Hiller (22–19–10)	**Theodore** (15–11–5)	15,945	27–20–11	65	Recap
59	February 23	Minnesota Wild	3–2	SO	Backstrom (16–15–5)	**Theodore** (15–11–6)	13,892	27–20–12	66	Recap
60	February 25	@ Carolina Hurricanes	3–2	SO	**Theodore** (16–11–6)	Peters (2–3–2)	18,680	28–20–12	68	Recap
61	February 26	Montreal Canadiens	4–2		**Clemmensen** (11–5–5)	Budaj (2–6–1)	18,108	29–20–12	70	Recap
62	February 28	@ Toronto Maple Leafs	5–3		**Theodore** (17–11–6)	Reimer (11–11–4)	19,420	30–20–12	72	Recap

March 2012: 7–5–4 (Home: 5–1–2; Road: 2–4–2)
#	**Date**	**Opponent**	**Score**	**OT**	**Win**	**Loss**	**Attn.**	**Record**	**Pts**	**Recap**
63	March 1	@ Winnipeg Jets	7–0		Pavelec (24–21–7)	**Theodore** (17–12–6)	15,004	30–21–12	72	Recap
64	March 3	Nashville Predators	3–1		Rinne (36–13–7)	**Clemmensen** (11–6–5)	15,904	30–22–12	72	Recap
65	March 4	Ottawa Senators	4–2		**Theodore** (18–12–6)	Lehner (3–2–0)	15,811	31–22–12	74	Recap
66	March 8	@ Philadelphia Flyers	5–0		Bryzgalov (26–13–6)	**Theodore** (18–13–6)	19,675	31–23–12	74	Recap
67	March 9	@ Pittsburgh Penguins	2–1	SO	Fleury (36–14–3)	**Theodore** (18–13–7)	18,606	31–23–13	75	Recap
68	March 11	Carolina Hurricanes	2–0		**Theodore** (19–13–7)	Ward (24–20–12)	15,081	32–23–13	77	Recap
69	March 13	Toronto Maple Leafs	5–2		**Theodore** (20–13–7)	Reimer (6–9–5)	15,727	33–23–13	79	Recap
70	March 15	Boston Bruins	6–2		**Theodore** (21–13–7)	Thomas (29–18–0)	19,004	34–23–13	81	Recap
71	March 17	Buffalo Sabres	3–2	SO	**Theodore** (22–13–7)	Miller (25–18–7)	16,827	35–23–13	83	Recap
72	March 20	@ Philadelphia Flyers	2–1		**Clemmensen** (12–6–5)	Bryzgalov (30–14–7)	18,680	36–23–13	85	Recap
73	March 21	@ Carolina Hurricanes	3–1		Ward (27–21–12)	**Theodore** (22–14–7)	18,680	36–24–13	85	Recap
74	March 23	Edmonton Oilers	2–1	SO	Dubnyk (18–17–2)	**Theodore** (22–14–8)	16,214	36–24–14	86	Recap
75	March 25	New York Islanders	3–2	SO	Nabokov (18–18–3)	**Theodore** (22–14–9)	16,814	36–24–15	87	Recap
76	March 27	@ Montreal Canadiens	3–2	SO	**Clemmensen** (13–6–5)	Price (26–27–11)	21,273	37–24–15	89	Recap
77	March 29	@ Minnesota Wild	3–2	OT	Backstrom (18–17–6)	**Theodore** (22–14–10)	16,952	37–24–16	90	Recap
78	March 30	@ Columbus Blue Jackets	4–1		York (3–1–0)	**Theodore** (22–15–10)	17,994	37–25–16	90	Recap

April 2012: 1–1–2 (Home: 1–0–1; Road: 0–1–1)
#	**Date**	**Opponent**	**Score**	**OT**	**Win**	**Loss**	**Attn.**	**Record**	**Pts**	**Recap**3
79	April 1	@ Detroit Red Wings	2–1	SO	Howard (34–16–3)	**Clemmensen** (13–6–6)	20,066	37–25–17	91	Recap
80	April 3	Winnipeg Jets	5–4	OT	Pavelec (29–28–8)	**Theodore** (22–15–11)	17,760	37–25–18	92	Recap
81	April 5	@ Washington Capitals	4–2		Holtby (3–2–1)	**Theodore** (22–16–11)	18,506	37–26–18	92	Recap
82	April 7	Carolina Hurricanes	4–1		**Clemmensen** (14–6–6)	Boucher (1–6–1)	19,057	38–26–18	94	Recap

=== Playoffs ===
Legend
Panthers Win	Panthers Loss
Boldface text denotes a Panthers goalie

2011–12 Playoff Game Log

Eastern Conference Quarterfinal Series vs. (6) New Jersey Devils - Devils win series 4–3
#	**Date**	**Opponent**	**Score**	**OT**	**Win**	**Loss**	**Attn.**	Series	**Recap**
1	April 13	New Jersey Devils	3–2		Brodeur (1–0)	**Theodore** (0–1)	19,119	NJ lead 1–0	Recap
2	April 15	New Jersey Devils	4–2		**Theodore** (1–1)	Brodeur (1–1)	19,248	Series Tied 1–1	Recap
3	April 17	@ New Jersey Devils	4–3		**Clemmensen** (1–0)	Hedberg (0–1)	17,625	FLA lead 2–1	Recap
4	April 19	@ New Jersey Devils	4–0		Brodeur (2–1)	**Clemmensen** (1–1)	17,625	Series Tied 2–2	Recap
5	April 21	New Jersey Devils	3–0		**Theodore** (2–1)	Brodeur (2–2)	19,513	FLA lead 3–2	Recap
6	April 24	@ New Jersey Devils	3–2	OT	Brodeur (3–2)	**Clemmensen** (1–2)	17,625	Series tied 3–3	Recap
7	April 26	New Jersey Devils	3–2	2OT	Brodeur (4–2)	**Theodore** (2–2)	19,313	NJ wins 4–3	Recap

== Player statistics ==
=== Skaters ===
Note: GP = Games played; G = Goals; A = Assists; Pts = Points; +/− = Plus/minus; PIM = Penalty minutes

Regular season

Player	GP	G	A	Pts	+/−	PIM
Tomas Fleischmann	82	27	34	61	−7	26
Stephen Weiss	80	20	37	57	5	60
Kris Versteeg	71	23	31	54	4	49
Brian Campbell	82	4	49	53	−9	6
Jason Garrison	77	16	17	33	6	32
Tomas Kopecky	80	10	22	32	−8	32
Mikael Samuelsson^{†}	48	13	15	28	2	14
Dmitri Kulikov	58	4	24	28	−5	36
Marcel Goc	57	11	16	27	5	10
Shawn Matthias	79	10	14	24	−2	49
Sean Bergenheim	62	17	6	23	−5	48
Mike Weaver	82	0	16	16	-2	14
Ed Jovanovski	66	3	10	13	−11	31
Mike Santorelli	60	9	2	11	−10	18
Jack Skille	46	4	6	10	−9	28
Wojtek Wolski^{†}	22	4	5	9	−3	0
Matt Bradley	45	3	5	8	−3	31
Erik Gudbranson	72	2	6	8	−19	78
Marco Sturm^{†}	42	3	2	5	−8	23
Krys Barch^{†}	41	2	3	5	2	91
Scottie Upshall	26	2	3	5	−3	29
Michal Repik	17	2	3	5	−3	6
Keaton Ellerby	40	0	5	5	−3	10
John Madden	31	3	0	3	−4	4
Tyson Strachan	15	1	2	3	1	5
Evgenii Dadonov^{‡}	15	2	1	3	−4	2
Tim Kennedy^{‡}	27	1	1	2	−11	4
Jerred Smithson^{†}	16	0	1	1	1	4
Mark Cullen	6	0	1	1	2	2
Bill Thomas	7	1	0	1	0	0
David Booth^{‡}	6	0	1	1	−6	2
Nolan Yonkman	1	0	0	0	0	0
Bracken Kearns	5	0	0	0	0	10
Jon Matsumoto	1	0	0	0	0	0
Greg Rallo	1	0	0	0	0	0
Colby Robak	3	0	0	0	1	0
Ryan Carter^{‡}	7	0	0	0	−1	6

Playoffs

Player	GP	G	A	Pts	+/−	PIM
Sean Bergenheim	7	3	3	6	−2	4
Brian Campbell	7	1	4	5	−2	2
Mikael Samuelsson	7	0	5	5	-1	2
Stephen Weiss	7	3	2	5	0	6
Marcel Goc	7	2	3	5	0	0
Kris Versteeg	7	3	2	5	2	8
Tomas Fleischmann	7	1	2	3	0	2
Scottie Upshall	7	1	2	3	−1	4
Jason Garrison	4	1	2	3	-2	0
Jerred Smithson	5	0	1	1	-2	2
Mike Weaver	7	1	0	1	-1	0
Tomas Kopecky	7	1	0	1	−3	4
Tyson Strachan	2	0	1	1	2	0
Shawn Matthias	7	0	1	1	−2	6
Dmitri Kulikov	7	0	1	1	−4	4
Ed Jovanovski	7	0	0	0	−1	4
Marco Sturm	7	0	0	0	−3	4
John Madden	7	0	0	0	−3	0
Wojtek Wolski	2	0	0	0	−1	4
Keaton Ellerby	1	0	0	0	0	2
Erik Gudbranson	7	0	0	0	−2	8

=== Goaltenders ===
Note: GP = Games played; TOI = Time on ice (minutes); W = Wins; L = Losses; OT = Overtime losses; GA = Goals; GAA= Goals against average; SA= Shots against; SV= Saves; Sv% = Save percentage; SO= Shutouts

Regular season

Player	GP	TOI	W	L	OT	GA	GAA	SA	Sv%	SO	G	A	PIM
Jose Theodore	53	3049	22	16	11	125	2.46	1502	.917	3	0	0	2
Scott Clemmensen	30	1566	14	6	6	67	2.57	773	.913	1	0	1	0
Jacob Markstrom	7	383	2	4	1	17	2.66	222	.923	0	0	0	0
Brian Foster	1	5	0	0	0	0	0.00	1	1.000	0	0	0	0

Playoffs

Player	GP	TOI	W	L	GA	GAA	SA	Sv%	SO	G	A	PIM
Jose Theodore	5	268	2	2	11	2.46	135	.919	1	0	0	0
Scott Clemmensen	3	179	1	2	7	2.35	88	.920	0	0	1	0

^{†}Denotes player spent time with another team before joining Panthers. Stats reflect time with Panthers only.
^{‡}Traded mid-season
Bold/italics denotes franchise record

== Awards and records ==
=== Awards ===
Regular Season
Player	Award	Awarded

=== Milestones ===
Regular Season
Player	Milestone	Reached
Erik Gudbranson	1st Career NHL Game	October 8, 2011
Bracken Kearns	1st Career NHL Game	October 20, 2011
Jacob Markstrom	1st Career NHL Win	October 22, 2011
Jack Skille	100th Career NHL Game	October 24, 2011
Tomas Kopecky	100th Career NHL Point	October 29, 2011
Marcel Goc	400th Career NHL Game	October 31, 2011
Marco Sturm	900th Career NHL Game	October 31, 2011
Tomas Fleischmann	100th Career NHL Assist	November 10, 2011
Erik Gudbranson	1st Career NHL Assist; 1st Career NHL Point	December 1, 2011
Tim Kennedy	100th Career NHL Game	December 1, 2011
Jose Theodore	600th Career NHL Game	December 8, 2011
Erik Gudbranson	1st Career NHL Goal	December 11, 2011
Kris Versteeg	100th Career NHL Assist	December 11, 2011
Greg Rallo	1st Career NHL Game	December 18, 2011
Stephen Weiss	600th Career NHL Game	January 18, 2012
Brian Foster	1st Career NHL Game	February 4, 2012
Kris Versteeg	300th Career NHL Game	February 7, 2012
Keaton Ellerby	100th Career NHL Game	February 9, 2012
Tomas Fleischmann	200th Career NHL Point	February 12, 2012
Colby Robak	1st Career NHL Game	February 12, 2012
Tyson Strachan	1st Career NHL Goal	February 12, 2012
Tomas Kopecky	400th Career NHL Game	March 3, 2012
Krys Barch	300th Career NHL Game	March 13, 2012
Brian Campbell	300th Career NHL Assist	March 15, 2012
Brian Campbell	700th Career NHL Game	March 23, 2012
Shawn Matthias	200th Career NHL Game	March 27, 2012
Mike Weaver	500th Career NHL Game	April 1, 2012
Kris Versteeg	200th Career NHL Point	April 3, 2012

== Transactions ==
The Panthers have been involved in the following transactions during the 2011–12 season.

=== Trades ===
Date	Details
June 24, 2011	To Chicago Blackhawks Rostislav Olesz	To Florida Panthers Brian Campbell
June 25, 2011	To San Jose Sharks 2nd-round pick (47th overall) in 2011	To Florida Panthers 2nd-round pick (59th overall) in 2011; 3rd-round pick in 2012
June 27, 2011	To Chicago Blackhawks Conditional 7th-round pick in 2012 (Note: Condition satisfied.)	To Florida Panthers Tomas Kopecky (Note: Trade of negotiating rights to.)
July 1, 2011	To Philadelphia Flyers Conditional 2nd-round pick in 2012 (Note: Condition satisfied.); 3rd-round pick in 2012	To Florida Panthers Kris Versteeg
July 9, 2011	To Winnipeg Jets Kenndal McArdle	To Florida Panthers Angelo Esposito
July 9, 2011	To Calgary Flames Jordan Henry	To Florida Panthers Keith Seabrook
July 9, 2011	To Vancouver Canucks Mike Duco	To Florida Panthers Sergei Shirokov
September 8, 2011	To Phoenix Coyotes Marc Cheverie	To Florida Panthers Justin Bernhardt
October 22, 2011	To Vancouver Canucks David Booth; Steven Reinprecht; 3rd-round pick in 2013	To Florida Panthers Mikael Samuelsson; Marco Sturm
December 2, 2011	To Tampa Bay Lightning Michael Kostka; Evan Oberg	To Florida Panthers Michael Vernace; James Wright
December 7, 2011	To Dallas Stars Jake Hauswirth; 5th-round pick in 2012	To Florida Panthers Krys Barch; 6th-round pick in 2012
January 13, 2012	To Dallas Stars Angelo Esposito	To Florida Panthers Ondrej Roman
January 18, 2012	To Carolina Hurricanes Evgenii Dadonov; A. J. Jenks	To Florida Panthers Jon Matsumoto; Mattias Lindstrom
January 26, 2012	To San Jose Sharks Tim Kennedy	To Florida Panthers Sean Sullivan
February 24, 2012	To Nashville Predators 6th-round pick in 2012	To Florida Panthers Jerred Smithson
February 25, 2012	To New York Rangers Michael Vernace; 3rd-round pick in 2013	To Florida Panthers Wojtek Wolski

=== Free agents acquired ===
Player	Former team	Contract terms
Michael Kostka	Rochester Americans	1 year, $525,000
Scottie Upshall	Columbus Blue Jackets	4 years, $14 million
Jose Theodore	Minnesota Wild	2 years, $3 million
Ed Jovanovski	Phoenix Coyotes	4 years, $16.5 million
Marcel Goc	Nashville Predators	3 years, $5.1 million
Tomas Fleischmann	Colorado Avalanche	4 years, $18 million
Nolan Yonkman	Phoenix Coyotes	2 years, $1.4 million
Sean Bergenheim	Tampa Bay Lightning	4 years, $11 million
Matt Bradley	Washington Capitals	2 years, $1.9 million
Greg Rallo	Texas Stars	1 year, $550,000
Tyson Strachan	St. Louis Blues	1 year, $750,000
Bracken Kearns	San Antonio Rampage	1 year, $700,000
Bill Thomas	San Antonio Rampage	1 year, $550,000
John Madden	Minnesota Wild	1 year, $600,000

=== Free agents lost ===
Player	New team	Contract terms
Marty Reasoner	New York Islanders	2 years, $2.7 million
Darcy Hordichuk	Edmonton Oilers	1 year, $825,000
Clay Wilson	Calgary Flames	2 years, $1.05 million
Tomas Vokoun	Washington Capitals	1 year, $1.5 million
Niclas Bergfors	Nashville Predators	1 year, $575,000
Alexander Sulzer	Vancouver Canucks	1 year, $700,000
Patrick Rissmiller	Colorado Avalanche	1 year, $525,000
Byron Bitz	Vancouver Canucks	1 year, $700,000
Joe Callahan	Montreal Canadiens	1 year, $550,000
Steve Bernier	Albany Devils	1 year, $105,000

=== Claimed via waivers ===
Player	Former team	Date claimed off waivers

=== Lost via waivers ===
Player	New team	Date claimed off waivers
Ryan Carter	New Jersey Devils	October 26, 2011

=== Lost via retirement ===
Player
Cory Stillman

=== Player signings ===
Player	Date	Contract terms
Roman Derlyuk	May 31, 2011	1 year, $710,000 entry-level contract
Jack Skille	May 31, 2011	2 years, $1.65 million
Garrett Wilson	June 1, 2011	3 years, $2.05 million entry-level contract
Mark Cullen	June 6, 2011	1 year, $600,000
Tim Kennedy	June 20, 2011	1 year, $550,000
Tomas Kopecky	June 29, 2011	4 years, $12 million
Mike Santorelli	July 6, 2011	2 years, $3.2 million
Ryan Carter	July 9, 2011	1 year, $750,000
Erik Gudbranson	July 15, 2011	3 years, $2.7 million entry-level contract
Marc Cheverie	July 21, 2011	1 year, $803,500
Tyler Plante	July 21, 2011	1 year, $721,850
Michael Caruso	July 25, 2011	1 year, $550,000
Shawn Matthias	September 9, 2011	2 years, $1.70325 million
Jonathan Huberdeau	October 10, 2011	3 years, $2.775 million entry-level contract
Mike Weaver	December 30, 2011	2 years, $2.2 million contract extension
Tyson Strachan	February 15, 2012	1 year, $600,000 contract extension
Drew Shore	March 27, 2012	3 years, $2.7 million entry-level contract
Vincent Trocheck	April 23, 2012	3 years, $2.0775 million entry-level contract

== Draft picks ==
Florida's picks at the 2011 NHL entry draft in St. Paul, Minnesota.

Round	#	Player	Position	Nationality	College/Junior/Club team (League)
1	3	Jonathan Huberdeau	C	Canada	Saint John Sea Dogs (QMJHL)
2	33	Rocco Grimaldi	C	United States	U.S. National Team Development Program (USHL)
2	59 (from San Jose)	Rasmus Bengtsson	D	Sweden	Rogle BK (Allsvenskan)
3	64	Vincent Trocheck	C	United States	Saginaw Spirit (OHL)
3	76 (from NY Rangers)	Logan Shaw	RW	Canada	Cape Breton Screaming Eagles (QMJHL)
3	87 (from Washington)	Jonathan Racine	D	Canada	Shawinigan Cataractes (QMJHL)
3	91 (from Boston)	Kyle Rau	C	United States	Eden Prairie High School (USHS-MN)
5	124	Yaroslav Kosov	F	Russia	Metallurg Magnitogorsk 2 (MHL)
6	154	Edward Wittchow	D	United States	Burnsville High School (USHS-MN)
7	184	Iiro Pakarinen	RW	Finland	KalPa (SM-liiga)

== See also ==
- 2011–12 NHL season
