= 2011–12 Toronto Maple Leafs season =

NHL hockey team season

2011–12 Toronto Maple Leafs
- Division: 4th Northeast
- Conference: 13th Eastern
- 2011–12 record: 35–37–10

Team information
- General manager: Brian Burke
- Coach: Ron Wilson (Oct.–Mar.); Randy Carlyle (Mar.–Apr.)
- Captain: Dion Phaneuf
- Alternate captains: Colby Armstrong; Mikhail Grabovski; Phil Kessel (Oct.–Feb.); Mike Komisarek
- Arena: Air Canada Centre
- Average attendance: 19,484 (103.53%)

Team leaders
- Goals: Phil Kessel (37)
- Assists: Phil Kessel (45)
- Points: Phil Kessel (82)
- Penalty minutes: Dion Phaneuf (90)
- Plus/minus: Joey Crabb (+3)
- Wins: Jonas Gustavsson (17)
- Goals against average: Jonas Gustavsson (2.92)

The 2011–12 Toronto Maple Leafs season was the 95th season for the National Hockey League (NHL) franchise that was established on November 22, 1917. The team failed to make the Stanley Cup playoffs for the seventh-straight season for the first time in franchise history.

== Off-season ==
At the 2011 NHL entry draft, general manager Brian Burke fulfilled his pledge to trade up in the first round, trading the 30th (Rickard Rakell) and 39th (John Gibson) picks to the Anaheim Ducks in exchange for the 22nd pick, which was used to select Tyler Biggs. The Leafs also selected Stuart Percy with the 25th pick.

The Leafs made two key free agent additions, adding centers Tim Connolly from the Buffalo Sabres and Philippe Dupuis from the Colorado Avalanche. The Leafs also added to their blue line by trading Brett Lebda and prospect Robert Slaney to the Nashville Predators in exchange for Cody Franson and center Matthew Lombardi.

The Leafs suffered no major losses during the off-season, however Tim Brent, who had an impressive season with the Leafs, was signed by the Carolina Hurricanes and veteran goalie Jean-Sebastien Giguere was acquired by the Colorado Avalanche. Other Leafs to depart the team included Danny Richmond (to the Washington Capitals), Christian Hanson, (to Washington) and Fabian Brunnstrom (to the Detroit Red Wings).

On October 4, the Leafs traded their fourth-round pick at the 2012 NHL entry draft to the New Jersey Devils in exchange for centre Dave Steckel.

Prior to the beginning of the regular season, the Leafs unveiled new alternate jerseys, similar to the ones they used when they last won the Stanley Cup in 1967.

== Pre-season ==
The Maple Leafs went 4–4 in pre-season play.

== Regular season ==
The Maple Leafs got off to a fast start, winning their first three games and seven of their first ten, finishing October in first place in the Northeast Division, second in the Conference. Phil Kessel was the NHL's leading points scorer with 18, and leading goal scorer with 10. James Reimer was the starting goaltender for the first five games, but was injured in his next start when the Montreal Canadiens' Brian Gionta struck Reimer in the jaw while fighting for the puck. Early in the season, the Leafs' power play has dramatically improved, with a 21.6% conversion rate, good for third in the league as of December 17, 2011. However, when short-handed, they had been less efficient, with a 73.0% kill rate, the worst in the NHL.

On February 9, 2012, the NHL announced that the Leafs would play the Detroit Red Wings at Michigan Stadium for the 2013 NHL Winter Classic on January 1, 2013. It would later be postponed to 2014 due to the lockout.

With the Leafs falling out of the playoff race and in the midst of losing 10 of their last 11 games, including a six-game losing streak, head coach Ron Wilson was fired and replaced by Randy Carlyle on March 2, 2012. The Leafs went 6–9–3 under Carlyle to end the season.

== Playoffs ==
The Maple Leafs attempted to finally qualify for the Stanley Cup playoffs for the first time since the 2003–04 season. The Hockey News predicted that the Leafs will place tenth and miss the playoffs. The Maple Leafs were ultimately eliminated from playoff contention.

== Standings ==
Northeast Division
Pos	Team	GP	W	L	OTL	ROW	GF	GA	GD	Pts
1	y – Boston Bruins	82	49	29	4	40	269	202	+67	102
2	x – Ottawa Senators	82	41	31	10	35	249	240	+9	92
3	Buffalo Sabres	82	39	32	11	32	218	230	−12	89
4	Toronto Maple Leafs	82	35	37	10	31	231	264	−33	80
5	Montreal Canadiens	82	31	35	16	26	212	226	−14	78

Source: National Hockey League
x – Clinched playoff spot; y – Clinched division

Eastern Conference
Pos	Div	Team	GP	W	L	OTL	ROW	GF	GA	GD	Pts
1	AT	z – New York Rangers	82	51	24	7	47	226	187	+39	109
2	NE	y – Boston Bruins	82	49	29	4	40	269	202	+67	102
3	SE	y – Florida Panthers	82	38	26	18	32	203	227	−24	94
4	AT	x – Pittsburgh Penguins	82	51	25	6	42	282	221	+61	108
5	AT	x – Philadelphia Flyers	82	47	26	9	43	264	232	+32	103
6	AT	x – New Jersey Devils	82	48	28	6	36	228	209	+19	102
7	SE	x – Washington Capitals	82	42	32	8	38	222	230	−8	92
8	NE	x – Ottawa Senators	82	41	31	10	35	249	240	+9	92
9	NE	Buffalo Sabres	82	39	32	11	32	218	230	−12	89
10	SE	Tampa Bay Lightning	82	38	36	8	35	235	281	−46	84
11	SE	Winnipeg Jets	82	37	35	10	33	225	246	−21	84
12	SE	Carolina Hurricanes	82	33	33	16	32	213	243	−30	82
13	NE	Toronto Maple Leafs	82	35	37	10	31	231	264	−33	80
14	AT	New York Islanders	82	34	37	11	27	203	255	−52	79
15	NE	Montreal Canadiens	82	31	35	16	26	212	226	−14	78

Source: National Hockey League
x – Clinched playoff spot; y – Clinched division; z – Clinched conference

== Schedule and results ==
=== Pre-season ===
2011 Pre-season game log: 4–4–0 (home: 1–3–0; road: 3–1–0)

#	Date	Visitor	Score	Home	OT	Decision	Record
1	September 19	Ottawa Senators	2–4	Toronto Maple Leafs		Jonas Gustavsson	1–0–0
2	September 20	Philadelphia Flyers	4–0	Toronto Maple Leafs		James Reimer	1–1–0
3	September 21	Toronto Maple Leafs	4–2	Philadelphia Flyers		Jonas Gustavsson	2–1–0
4	September 23	Buffalo Sabres	2–1	Toronto Maple Leafs		James Reimer	2–2–0
5	September 24	Toronto Maple Leafs	2–3	Buffalo Sabres		Jonas Gustavsson	2–3–0
6	September 27	Toronto Maple Leafs	5–3	Ottawa Senators		James Reimer	3–3–0
7	September 30	Toronto Maple Leafs	4–3	Detroit Red Wings	OT	Jonas Gustavsson	4–3–0
8	October 1	Detroit Red Wings	4–2	Toronto Maple Leafs		James Reimer	4–4–0

=== Regular season ===
2011–12 Game Log: 35–37–10, 80 Points (home: 18–16–7; road: 17–21–3)
October: 7–3–1, 15 Points (home: 5–0–1; road: 2–3–0)

Game	October	Opponent	Score	Location (Attendance)	Record	Points	Decision
1	6	Montreal Canadiens	2–0	Air Canada Centre (19,606)	1–0–0	2	Reimer
2	8	Ottawa Senators	6–5	Air Canada Centre (19,324)	2–0–0	4	Reimer
3	15	Calgary Flames	3–2	Air Canada Centre (19,410)	3–0–0	6	Reimer
4	17	Colorado Avalanche	2–3 (OT)	Air Canada Centre (19,359)	3–0–1	7	Reimer
5	19	Winnipeg Jets	4–3 (SO)	Air Canada Centre (19,514)	4–0–1	9	Reimer
6	20	@ Boston Bruins	2–6	TD Garden (17,565)	4–1–1	9	Gustavsson
7	22	@ Montreal Canadiens	5–4 (OT)	Bell Centre (21,273)	5–1–1	11	Gustavsson
8	24	@ Philadelphia Flyers	2–4	Wells Fargo Center (19,569)	5–2–1	11	Gustavsson
9	27	@ New York Rangers	4–2	Madison Square Garden (18,200)	6–2–1	13	Gustavsson
10	29	Pittsburgh Penguins	4–3	Air Canada Centre (19,526)	7–2–1	15	Gustavsson
11	30	@ Ottawa Senators	2–3	Scotiabank Place (19,522)	7–3–1	15	Gustavsson

November: 7–6–1, 15 Points (home: 1–4–1; road: 6–2–0)

Game	November	Opponent	Score	Location/Attendance	Record	Points	Decision
12	2	@ New Jersey Devils	5–3	Prudential Center (13,033)	8–3–1	17	Gustavsson
13	3	@ Columbus Blue Jackets	4–1	Nationwide Arena (14,306)	9–3–1	19	Scrivens
14	5	Boston Bruins	0–7	Air Canada Centre (19,497)	9–4–1	19	Scrivens
15	8	Florida Panthers	1–5	Air Canada Centre (19,414)	9–5–1	19	Gustavsson
16	10	@ St. Louis Blues	3–2 (SO)	Scottrade Center (19,150)	10–5–1	21	Scrivens
17	12	Ottawa Senators	2–5	Air Canada Centre (19,553)	10–6–1	21	Scrivens
18	15	Phoenix Coyotes	2–3 (SO)	Air Canada Centre (19,522)	10–6–2	22	Scrivens
19	17	@ Nashville Predators	1–4	Bridgestone Arena (16,135)	10–7–2	22	Scrivens
20	19	Washington Capitals	7–1	Air Canada Centre (19,594)	11–7–2	24	Gustavsson
21	20	@ Carolina Hurricanes	2–3	RBC Center (13,187)	11–8–2	24	Scrivens
22	22	@ Tampa Bay Lightning	7–1	St. Pete Times Forum (19,204)	12–8–2	26	Gustavsson
23	25	@ Dallas Stars	4–3 (SO)	American Airlines Center (18,532)	13–8–2	28	Gustavsson
24	27	@ Anaheim Ducks	5–2	Honda Center (13,685)	14–8–2	30	Gustavsson
25	30	Boston Bruins	3–6	Air Canada Centre (19,643)	14–9–2	30	Gustavsson

December: 4–6–3, 11 Points (home: 2–1–2; road: 2–5–1)

Game	December	Opponent	Score	Location/Attendance	Record	Points	Decision
26	3	@ Boston Bruins	1–4	TD Garden (17,565)	14–10–2	30	Reimer
27	5	@ New York Rangers	4–2	Madison Square Garden (18,200)	15–10–2	32	Gustavsson
28	6	New Jersey Devils	2–3 (OT)	Air Canada Centre (19,513)	15–10–3	33	Reimer
29	9	@ Washington Capitals	2–4	Verizon Center (18,506)	15–11–3	33	Reimer
30	13	Carolina Hurricanes	2–1 (OT)	Air Canada Centre (19,509)	16–11–3	35	Reimer
31	16	@ Buffalo Sabres	4–5	First Niagara Center (18,690)	16–12–3	35	Reimer
32	17	Vancouver Canucks	3–5	Air Canada Centre (19,633)	16–13–3	35	Gustavsson
33	19	Los Angeles Kings	2–3 (SO)	Air Canada Centre (19,521)	16–13–4	36	Reimer
34	22	Buffalo Sabres	3–2	Air Canada Centre (19,473)	17–13–4	38	Reimer
35	23	@ New York Islanders	5–3	Nassau Veterans Memorial Coliseum (12,432)	18–13–4	40	Reimer
36	27	@ Florida Panthers	3–5	BankAtlantic Center (20,406)	18–14–4	40	Gustavsson
37	29	@ Carolina Hurricanes	3–4 (OT)	RBC Center (17,461)	18–14–5	41	Reimer
38	31	@ Winnipeg Jets	2–3	MTS Centre (15,004)	18–15–5	41	Reimer

January: 7–4–1, 15 Points (home: 6–3–0; road: 1–1–1)

Game	January	Opponent	Score	Location/Attendance	Record	Points	Decision
39	3	Tampa Bay Lightning	7–3	Air Canada Centre (19,425)	19–15–5	43	Gustavsson
40	5	Winnipeg Jets	4–0	Air Canada Centre (19,514)	20–15–5	45	Gustavsson
41	7	Detroit Red Wings	4–3	Air Canada Centre (19,536)	21–15–5	47	Gustavsson
42	10	Buffalo Sabres	2–0	Air Canada Centre (19,431)	22–15–5	49	Gustavsson
43	13	@ Buffalo Sabres	2–3	First Niagara Center (18,690)	22–16–5	49	Gustavsson
44	14	New York Rangers	0–3	Air Canada Centre (19,617)	22–17–5	49	Gustavsson
45	17	Ottawa Senators	2–3	Air Canada Centre (19,615)	22–18–5	49	Reimer
46	19	Minnesota Wild	4–1	Air Canada Centre (19,421)	23–18–5	51	Gustavsson
47	21	Montreal Canadiens	1–3	Air Canada Centre (19,643)	23–19–5	51	Gustavsson
48	23	New York Islanders	3–0	Air Canada Centre (19,570)	24–19–5	53	Gustavsson
49	24	@ New York Islanders	4–3 (OT)	Nassau Veterans Memorial Coliseum (10,888)	25–19–5	55	Gustavsson
50	31	@ Pittsburgh Penguins	4–5 (SO)	Consol Energy Center (18,550)	25–19–6	56	Gustavsson

February: 4–9–1, 9 Points (home: 2–4–1; road: 2–5–0)

Game	February	Opponent	Score	Location/Attendance	Record	Points	Decision
51	1	Pittsburgh Penguins	1–0	Air Canada Centre (19,542)	26–19–6	58	Reimer
52	4	@ Ottawa Senators	5–0	Scotiabank Place (20,500)	27–19–6	60	Reimer
53	6	Edmonton Oilers	6–3	Air Canada Centre (19,581)	28–19–6	62	Reimer
54	7	@ Winnipeg Jets	1–2	MTS Centre (15,004)	28–20–6	62	Gustavsson
55	9	@ Philadelphia Flyers	3–4	Wells Fargo Center (19,684)	28–21–6	62	Reimer
56	11	Montreal Canadiens	0–5	Air Canada Centre (19,685)	28–22–6	62	Reimer
57	14	@ Calgary Flames	1–5	Scotiabank Saddledome (19,289)	28–23–6	62	Gustavsson
58	15	@ Edmonton Oilers	4–3 (OT)	Rexall Place (16,839)	29–23–6	64	Reimer
59	18	@ Vancouver Canucks	2–6	Rogers Arena (18,890)	29–24–6	64	Reimer
60	21	New Jersey Devils	3–4 (OT)	Air Canada Centre (19,426)	29–24–7	65	Gustavsson
61	23	San Jose Sharks	1–2	Air Canada Centre (19,493)	29–25–7	65	Reimer
62	25	Washington Capitals	2–4	Air Canada Centre (19,577)	29–26–7	65	Reimer
63	28	Florida Panthers	3–5	Air Canada Centre (19,420)	29–27–7	65	Reimer
64	29	@ Chicago Blackhawks	4–5	United Center (21,244)	29–28–7	65	Gustavsson

March: 5–8–2, 12 Points (home: 1–4–2; road: 4–4–0)

Game	March	Opponent	Score	Location/Attendance	Record	Points	Decision
65	3	@ Montreal Canadiens	3–1	Bell Centre (21,273)	30–28–7	67	Gustavsson
66	6	Boston Bruins	4–5	Air Canada Centre (19,684)	30–29–7	67	Gustavsson
67	7	@ Pittsburgh Penguins	2–3	Consol Energy Center (18,539)	30–30–7	67	Gustavsson
68	10	Philadelphia Flyers	0–1 (SO)	Air Canada Centre (19,559)	30–30–8	68	Gustavsson
69	11	@ Washington Capitals	0–2	Verizon Center (18,506)	30–31–8	68	Gustavsson
70	13	@ Florida Panthers	2–5	BankAtlantic Center (17,475)	30–32–8	68	Reimer
71	15	@ Tampa Bay Lightning	3–1	Tampa Bay Times Forum (19,204)	31–32–8	70	Reimer
72	17	@ Ottawa Senators	3–1	Scotiabank Place (20,500)	32–32–8	72	Reimer
73	19	@ Boston Bruins	0–8	TD Garden (17,565)	32–33–8	72	Reimer
74	20	New York Islanders	2–5	Air Canada Centre (19,351)	32–34–8	72	Reimer
75	23	@ New Jersey Devils	4–3 (SO)	Prudential Center (16,022)	33–34–8	74	Reimer
76	24	New York Rangers	3–4 (SO)	Air Canada Centre (19,507)	33–34–9	75	Gustavsson
77	27	Carolina Hurricanes	0–3	Air Canada Centre (19,348)	33–35–9	75	Gustavsson
78	29	Philadelphia Flyers	1–7	Air Canada Centre (19,415)	33–36–9	75	Rynnas
79	31	Buffalo Sabres	4–3	Air Canada Centre (19,446)	34–36–9	77	Scrivens

April: 1–1–1, 3 Points (home: 1–0–0; road: 0–1–1)

Game	April	Opponent	Score	Location/Attendance	Record	Points	Decision
80	3	@ Buffalo Sabres	5–6 (OT)	First Niagara Center (18,690)	34–36–10	78	Scrivens
81	5	Tampa Bay Lightning	3–2 (OT)	Air Canada Centre (19,369)	35–36–10	80	Scrivens
82	7	@ Montreal Canadiens	1–4	Bell Centre (21,273)	35–37–10	80	Scrivens

== Player statistics ==
Final stats

=== Skaters ===
Regular season
Player	GP	G	A	Pts	+/-	PIM
Phil Kessel	82	37	45	82	−10	20
Joffrey Lupul	66	25	42	67	1	48
Mikhail Grabovski	74	23	28	51	0	51
Tyler Bozak	73	18	29	47	−7	22
Dion Phaneuf	82	12	32	44	−10	92
Clarke MacArthur	73	20	23	43	3	37
Tim Connolly	70	13	23	36	−14	40
Jake Gardiner	75	7	23	30	−2	18
Nikolai Kulemin	70	7	21	28	2	6
John-Michael Liles	66	7	20	27	−14	20
Joey Crabb	67	11	15	26	1	33
Luke Schenn	79	2	20	22	−6	62
Cody Franson	57	5	16	21	−1	22
Carl Gunnarsson	76	4	15	19	−9	20
Matthew Lombardi	62	8	10	18	−19	10
Matt Frattin	56	8	7	15	−4	25
Dave Steckel	76	8	5	13	−14	10
Nazem Kadri	21	5	2	7	2	8
Mike Komisarek	45	1	4	5	−13	41
Joe Colborne	10	1	4	5	2	4
Mike Brown	50	2	2	4	−8	74
Colby Armstrong	29	1	2	3	−8	9
Darryl Boyce^{‡}	17	1	1	2	−3	16
Keith Aulie^{‡}	17	0	2	2	−2	16
Colton Orr	5	1	0	1	1	5
Ryan Hamilton	2	0	1	1	−1	2
Philippe Dupuis	30	0	0	0	−2	16
Jay Rosehill	31	0	0	0	−4	60
Carter Ashton	15	0	0	0	−10	13

=== Goaltenders ===
Regular season
Player	GP	GS	TOI	W	L	OT	GA	GAA	SA	SV%	SO	G	A	PIM
Jonas Gustavsson	42	36	2301	17	17	4	112	2.92	1147	.902	4	0	1	4
James Reimer	34	34	1879	14	14	4	97	3.10	974	.900	3	0	0	0
Ben Scrivens	12	11	672	4	5	2	35	3.13	359	.903	0	0	0	4
Jussi Rynnas	2	1	99	0	1	0	7	4.24	40	.825	0	0	0	0

^{†}Denotes player spent time with another team before joining Maple Leafs. Stats reflect time with Maple Leafs only.
^{‡}Traded mid-season.
Bold/italics denotes franchise record.

== Awards and records ==
=== Awards ===
Regular Season
Player	Award	Reached
Phil Kessel	NHL First Star of the Week	October 17, 2011
Phil Kessel	NHL First Star of the Month	October 2011
Joffrey Lupul	NHL Third Star of the Month	November 2011
Dion Phaneuf	NHL All-Star Game	2012
Phil Kessel	NHL All-Star Game	2012
Joffrey Lupul	NHL All-Star Game	2012
Joffrey Lupul	NHL Second Star of the Week	January 9, 2012
Mikhail Grabovski	NHL First Star of the Week	January 30, 2012
James Reimer	NHL Third Star of the Week	February 6, 2012

=== Milestones ===
Regular Season
Player	Milestone	Reached
Jake Gardiner	1st Career NHL Game	October 6, 2011
Jake Gardiner	1st Career NHL Assist; 1st Career NHL Point	October 20, 2011
Matt Frattin	1st Career NHL Assist; 1st Career NHL Point	October 24, 2011
Mike Brown	200th Career NHL Game	October 24, 2011
Clarke MacArthur	300th Career NHL Game	November 3, 2011
Ben Scrivens	1st Career NHL Game; 1st Career NHL Win	November 3, 2011
Philippe Dupuis	100th Career NHL Game	November 10, 2011
Matt Frattin	1st Career NHL Goal	November 19, 2011
Tim Connolly	400th Career NHL Point	November 19, 2011
Joe Colborne	1st Career NHL Goal	November 23, 2011
Phil Kessel	400th Career NHL Game	December 3, 2011
Dion Phaneuf	500th Career NHL Game	December 13, 2011
Joey Crabb	100th Career NHL Game	December 22, 2011
Dion Phaneuf	200th Career NHL Assist	December 23, 2011
Keith Aulie	1st Career NHL Assist	January 3, 2012
Joffrey Lupul	300th Career NHL Point	January 3, 2012
Mikhail Grabovski	100th Career NHL Assist	January 13, 2012
Jake Gardiner	1st Career NHL Goal	January 25, 2012
Joffrey Lupul	500th Career NHL Game	February 1, 2012
Phil Kessel	300th Career NHL Point	February 6, 2012
Dion Phaneuf	300th Career NHL Point	February 6, 2012
Clarke MacArthur	100th Career NHL Assist	February 18, 2012
Mikhail Grabovski	300th Career NHL Game	February 23, 2012
Mike Komisarek	500th Career NHL Game	February 28, 2012
Jonas Gustavsson	100th Career NHL Game	March 3, 2012
Carter Ashton	1st Career NHL Game	March 7, 2012
Nikolai Kulemin	300th Career NHL Game	March 7, 2012
John-Michael Liles	300th Career NHL Point	March 15, 2012
Luke Schenn	300th Career NHL Game	March 17, 2012
Tyler Bozak	100th Career NHL Point	March 20, 2012
Matthew Lombardi	500th Career NHL Game	March 20, 2012
Ryan Hamilton	1st Career NHL Game; 1st Career NHL Assist; 1st Career NHL Point	March 23, 2012
Jussi Rynnas	1st Career NHL Game	March 27, 2012
Mikhail Grabovski	200th Career NHL Point	March 29, 2012
Tim Connolly	300th Career NHL Assist	April 3, 2012

== Transactions ==
The Maple Leafs have been involved in the following transactions during the 2011–12 season.

=== Trades ===
Date	Details
June 24, 2011	To Colorado Avalanche 2nd-round pick in 2012	To Toronto Maple Leafs John-Michael Liles
June 24, 2011	To Anaheim Ducks 1st-round pick (30th overall) in 2011; 2nd-round pick in 2011	To Toronto Maple Leafs 1st-round pick (22nd overall) in 2011
June 24, 2011	To Anaheim Ducks 6th-round pick in 2011	To Toronto Maple Leafs 6th-round pick in 2012
July 3, 2011	To Nashville Predators Brett Lebda; Robert Slaney; Conditional 4th-round pick in 2013 (Note: Condition satisfied.)	To Toronto Maple Leafs Matthew Lombardi; Cody Franson; Conditional 4th-round pick in 2013 (Note: Condition satisfied.)
October 4, 2011	To New Jersey Devils 4th-round pick in 2012	To Toronto Maple Leafs Dave Steckel
January 3, 2012	To Anaheim Ducks Luca Caputi	To Toronto Maple Leafs Nicolas Deschamps
February 27, 2012	To Tampa Bay Lightning Keith Aulie	To Toronto Maple Leafs Carter Ashton
February 27, 2012	To Anaheim Ducks Dale Mitchell	To Toronto Maple Leafs Mark Fraser

=== Free agents acquired ===
Player	Former team	Contract terms
Tim Connolly	Buffalo Sabres	2 years, $9.5 million
Philippe Dupuis	Colorado Avalanche	1 year, $650,000
Spencer Abbott	University of Maine	1 year, $925,000 entry-level contract

=== Free agents lost ===
Player	New team	Contract terms
Alex Foster	Sparta Prague	1 year
Tim Brent	Carolina Hurricanes	2 years, $1.5 million
Jean-Sebastien Giguere	Colorado Avalanche	2 years, $2.5 million
Danny Richmond	Washington Capitals	1 year, $525,000
Christian Hanson	Washington Capitals	1 year, $525,000
Fredrik Sjostrom	Farjestad BK	undisclosed
Brett Lebda	Springfield Falcons	Professional try-out

=== Claimed via waivers ===
Player	Former team	Date claimed off waivers

=== Lost via waivers ===
Player	New team	Date claimed off waivers
Darryl Boyce	Columbus Blue Jackets	February 25, 2012

=== Lost via retirement ===
Player

=== Player signings ===
Player	Date	Contract terms
Kenny Ryan	May 26, 2011	3 years, $2.07 million entry-level contract
James Reimer	June 9, 2011	3 years, $5.4 million
Carl Gunnarsson	June 14, 2011	2 years, $2.65 million
Luca Caputi	June 28, 2011	1 year, $525,000
Jay Rosehill	June 30, 2011	1 year, $600,000
Ben Scrivens	June 30, 2011	1 year, $600,000
Clarke MacArthur	July 5, 2011	2 years, $6.5 million
Tyler Bozak	July 6, 2011	2 years, $3 million
Matt Lashoff	July 7, 2011	1 year, $600,000
Michael Zigomanis	July 12, 2011	1 year, $650,000
Darryl Boyce	July 14, 2011	1 year, $700,000
Joey Crabb	July 19, 2011	1 year, $750,000
David Broll	July 29, 2011	3 years, $1.8675 million entry-level contract
Luke Schenn	September 16, 2011	5 years, $18 million
Stuart Percy	November 22, 2011	3 years, $2.775 million entry-level contract
John-Michael Liles	January 25, 2012	4 years, $15.5 million contract extension
Mikhail Grabovski	March 6, 2012	5 years, $27.5 million contract extension
Brad Ross	March 20, 2012	3 years, $2.12 million entry-level contract
Sam Carrick	March 31, 2012	3 years, $1.895 million entry-level contract

== Draft picks ==
Toronto's picks at the 2011 NHL entry draft in St. Paul, Minnesota.

Round	Pick	Player	Position	Nationality	Team (League)
1	22 (from Anaheim)	Tyler Biggs	RW	United States	U.S. National Team Development Program (USHL)
1	25 (from Philadelphia)	Stuart Percy	D	Canada	Mississauga St. Michael's Majors (OHL)
3	86 (from Philadelphia)	Josh Leivo	LW	Canada	Sudbury Wolves (OHL)
4	100	Tom Nilsson	D	Sweden	Mora IK (Swe-2)
5	130	Tony Cameranesi	C	United States	Wayzata High School (USHS-MN)
6	152 (from Edmonton)	David Broll	LW	Canada	Sault Ste. Marie Greyhounds (OHL)
6	173 (from Anaheim)	Dennis Robertson	D	Canada	Brown University (ECAC)
7	190	Garret Sparks	G	United States	Guelph Storm (OHL)
7	203 (from Anaheim)	Max Everson	D	United States	Edina High School (USHS-MN)

== See also ==
- 2011–12 NHL season
