= 2011–12 New York Islanders season =

NHL hockey team season

2011–12 New York Islanders
- Division: 5th Atlantic
- Conference: 14th Eastern
- 2011–12 record: 34–37–11
- Home record: 17–18–6
- Road record: 17–19–5
- Goals for: 200
- Goals against: 248

Team information
- General manager: Garth Snow
- Coach: Jack Capuano
- Captain: Mark Streit
- Alternate captains: Kyle Okposo; Brian Rolston (Oct.–Feb.); Steve Staios; John Tavares
- Arena: Nassau Veterans Memorial Coliseum
- Average attendance: 13,191 (81.3%); 540,838 in 41 games

Team leaders
- Goals: Matt Moulson (36)
- Assists: John Tavares (50)
- Points: John Tavares (81)
- Penalty minutes: Matt Martin (111)
- Plus/minus: Travis Hamonic (6)
- Wins: Evgeni Nabokov (19)
- Goals against average: Evgeni Nabokov (2.55)

The 2011–12 New York Islanders season was the 40th season in the franchise's history. The team failed to qualify for the Stanley Cup playoffs for the fifth straight season.

== Off-season ==
At the 2011 NHL entry draft, the Islanders selected playmaking center Ryan Strome from the Niagara IceDogs.

On July 1, 2011, the Islanders signed Marty Reasoner.

On August 1, 2011, a public referendum was held in Nassau County to authorize $400 million for a new coliseum as a home to the Islanders, a minor-league ballpark and other economic development projects. The plan was rejected by the voters, thus causing speculation that after the 2014–15 season, the Islanders may be moving.

== Pre-season ==
On June 30, 2011, the Islanders announced that they will play five pre-season games including two games each against the Bruins and Devils, and the other one against the Flames. The Islanders' final game of the pre-season, which is against the Bruins, will take place at the Webster Bank Arena in Bridgeport, Connecticut.

Defenceman Mark Streit is named team captain, following Doug Weight's retirement.

== Playoffs ==
The Islanders attempted to qualify for the Stanley Cup playoffs for the first time since the 2006–07 season, but failed to do so for the fifth straight season.

== Standings ==
Atlantic Division
Pos	Team	GP	W	L	OTL	ROW	GF	GA	GD	Pts
1	New York Rangers	82	51	24	7	47	226	187	+39	109
2	Pittsburgh Penguins	82	51	25	6	42	282	221	+61	108
3	Philadelphia Flyers	82	47	26	9	43	264	232	+32	103
4	New Jersey Devils	82	48	28	6	36	228	209	+19	102
5	New York Islanders	82	34	37	11	27	203	255	−52	79

Source: National Hockey League

Eastern Conference
Pos	Div	Team	GP	W	L	OTL	ROW	GF	GA	GD	Pts
1	AT	z – New York Rangers	82	51	24	7	47	226	187	+39	109
2	NE	y – Boston Bruins	82	49	29	4	40	269	202	+67	102
3	SE	y – Florida Panthers	82	38	26	18	32	203	227	−24	94
4	AT	x – Pittsburgh Penguins	82	51	25	6	42	282	221	+61	108
5	AT	x – Philadelphia Flyers	82	47	26	9	43	264	232	+32	103
6	AT	x – New Jersey Devils	82	48	28	6	36	228	209	+19	102
7	SE	x – Washington Capitals	82	42	32	8	38	222	230	−8	92
8	NE	x – Ottawa Senators	82	41	31	10	35	249	240	+9	92
9	NE	Buffalo Sabres	82	39	32	11	32	218	230	−12	89
10	SE	Tampa Bay Lightning	82	38	36	8	35	235	281	−46	84
11	SE	Winnipeg Jets	82	37	35	10	33	225	246	−21	84
12	SE	Carolina Hurricanes	82	33	33	16	32	213	243	−30	82
13	NE	Toronto Maple Leafs	82	35	37	10	31	231	264	−33	80
14	AT	New York Islanders	82	34	37	11	27	203	255	−52	79
15	NE	Montreal Canadiens	82	31	35	16	26	212	226	−14	78

Source: National Hockey League
x – Clinched playoff spot; y – Clinched division; z – Clinched conference

== Schedule and results ==
=== Pre-season ===
2011 Preseason game log: 1–4–0 (Home: 0–1–0; Road: 4–0–0)

Game	Date	Time (ET)	Opponent	Score	Decision	Location	Attendance	Recap
1	September 23	7:00pm	Boston	3-6	Nillson	TD Garden	16,555	
2	September 24	7:00pm	New Jersey	6–2	Poulin	Nassau Veterans Memorial Coliseum	7,107	
3	September 27	9:00pm	Calgary	0-2	Glencross	Scotiabank Saddledome	19,289	
4	September 30	7:00pm	New Jersey	0-1	Clarkson	Prudential Center	11,154	
5	October 1	7:00pm	Boston	2-3	Seidenberg	Webster Bank Arena (Bridgeport, Connecticut)	8,489	

=== Regular season ===
2011–12 Regular season game log: 4–6–2 (Home: 4–3–1; Road: 0–3–1)
October (Games: 9; Home: 6; Road: 3) (Record: 3–4–2; Home: 3–2–1; Road: 0–2–1)

Game	Date	Time (ET)	Opponent	Score	Decision	Location	Attendance	Recap
1	October 8	8:00pm	Florida	0–2	Montoya	Nassau Veterans Memorial Coliseum	16,234	Recap
2	October 10	1:00pm	Minnesota	2–1	Montoya	Nassau Veterans Memorial Coliseum	11,278	Recap
3	October 13	7:00pm	Tampa Bay	5–1	Montoya	Nassau Veterans Memorial Coliseum	9,759	Recap
4	October 15	7:00pm	NY Rangers	4–2	Nabokov	Nassau Veterans Memorial Coliseum	16,234	Recap
5	October 20	7:30pm	@ Tampa Bay	1–4	Montoya	St. Pete Times Forum	18,181	Recap
6	October 22	7:30pm	@ Florida	2–4	Nabokov	BankAtlantic Center	15,411	Recap
7	October 25	7:00pm	Pittsburgh	0–3	Nabokov	Nassau Veterans Memorial Coliseum	10,681	Recap
8	October 27	7:00pm	@ Pittsburgh	2 – 3 (SO)	DiPietro	Consol Energy Center	18,461	Recap
9	October 29	7:00pm	San Jose	2 – 3 (OT)	DiPietro	Nassau Veterans Memorial Coliseum	11,742	Recap

November (Games: 13; Home: 7; Road: 6) (Record: 4–7–2; Home: 2–4–1; Road: 2–3–1)

Game	Date	Time (ET)	Opponent	Score	Decision	Location	Attendance	Recap
10	November 3	7:00pm	Winnipeg	0–3	DiPietro	Nassau Veterans Memorial Coliseum	10,157	Recap
11	November 5	7:00pm	Washington	5–3	DiPietro	Nassau Veterans Memorial Coliseum	14,812	Recap
12	November 7	7:00pm	@ Boston	2–6	Nabokov	TD Garden	17,565	Recap
13	November 10	9:00pm	@ Colorado	3 – 4 (OT)	Montoya	Pepsi Center	13,221	Recap
14	November 13	9:00pm	@ Vancouver	1–4	Nabokov	Rogers Arena	18,860	Recap
15	November 15	7:00pm	NY Rangers	2–4	Nabokov	Nassau Veterans Memorial Coliseum	16,234	Recap
16	November 17	7:00pm	Montreal	4–3	DiPietro	Nassau Veterans Memorial Coliseum	9,928	Recap
17	November 19	7:00pm	Boston	0–6	DiPietro	Nassau Veterans Memorial Coliseum	16,011	Recap
18	November 21	7:00pm	@ Pittsburgh	0–5	Nilsson	Consol Energy Center	18,571	Recap
19	November 23	7:00pm	Philadelphia	3 – 4 (OT)	DiPietro	Nassau Veterans Memorial Coliseum	11,086	Recap
20	November 25	3:00pm	New Jersey	0–1	Montoya	Nassau Veterans Memorial Coliseum	15,358	Recap
21	November 26	1:00pm	@ New Jersey	3–2	Montoya	Prudential Center	16,014	Recap
22	November 29	7:00pm	@ Buffalo	2–1	Montoya	First Niagara Center	18,690	Recap

December (Games: 14; Home: 7; Road: 7) (Record: 6–6–2; Home: 3–3–1; Road: 3–3–1)

Game	Date	Time (ET)	Opponent	Score	Decision	Location	Attendance	Recap
23	December 2	8:30pm	@ Chicago	4 – 5 (SO)	Montoya	United Center	21,463	Recap
24	December 3	8:30pm	@ Dallas	5–4	DiPietro	American Airlines Center	14,423	Recap
25	December 6	7:00pm	Tampa Bay	5–1	Montoya	Nassau Veterans Memorial Coliseum	9,486	Recap
26	December 8	7:00pm	Chicago	2 – 3 (OT)	Montoya	Nassau Veterans Memorial Coliseum	10,711	Recap
27	December 10	7:00pm	Pittsburgh	3–6	Montoya	Nassau Veterans Memorial Coliseum	15,638	Recap
28	December 13	7:30pm	@ Montreal	3–5	Montoya	Bell Centre	21,273	Recap
29	December 15	7:00pm	Dallas	2–3	Poulin	Nassau Veterans Memorial Coliseum	9,288	Recap
30	December 17	8:00pm	@ Minnesota	2 – 1 (SO)	Montoya	XCel Energy Center	18,209	Recap
31	December 20	8:30pm	@ Winnipeg	3 – 2 (SO)	Nabokov	MTS Centre	15,004	Recap
32	December 22	7:00pm	@ NY Rangers	2–4	Nabokov	Madison Square Garden	18,200	Recap
33	December 23	7:00pm	Toronto	3–5	Nabokov	Nassau Veterans Memorial Coliseum	12,432	Recap
34	December 26	7:00pm	@ NY Rangers	0–3	Nabokov	Madison Square Garden	18,200	Recap
35	December 29	7:00pm	Calgary	3–1	Nabokov	Nassau Veterans Memorial Coliseum	14,819	Recap
36	December 31	1:00pm	Edmonton	4–1	Nabokov	Nassau Veterans Memorial Coliseum	13,807	Recap

January (Games: 13; Home: 6; Road: 7) (Record: 6–6–1; Home: 2–3–1; Road: 4–3–0)

Game	Date	Time (ET)	Opponent	Score	Decision	Location	Attendance	Recap
37	January 3	7:00pm	@ Carolina	4 – 3 (SO)	Nabokov	RBC Center	13,828	Recap
38	January 6	10:00pm	@ Anaheim	2–4	Nabokov	Honda Center	13,892	Recap
39	January 7	8:00pm	@ Phoenix	1–5	Nabokov	Jobing.com Arena	13,350	Recap
40	January 10	7:00pm	Detroit	5-1	Nabokov	Nassau Veterans Memorial Coliseum	12,864	Recap
41	January 12	7:00pm	Philadelphia	2–3	Nabokov	Nassau Veterans Memorial Coliseum	11,751	Recap
42	January 14	7:00pm	Buffalo	4–2	Nabokov	Nassau Veterans Memorial Coliseum	13,848	Recap
43	January 16	1:00pm	Nashville	1–3	Poulin	Nassau Veterans Memorial Coliseum	10,755	Recap
44	January 17	7:00pm	@ Washington	3–0	Nabokov	Verizon Center	18,506	Recap
45	January 19	7:00pm	@ Philadelphia	4–1	Nabokov	Wells Fargo Center	19,796	Recap
46	January 21	7:00pm	Carolina	2 – 1 (OT)	Nabokov	Nassau Veterans Memorial Coliseum	13,622	Recap
47	January 23	7:00pm	@ Toronto	0–3	Nabokov	Air Canada Centre	19,570	Recap
48	January 24	7:00pm	Toronto	3 – 4 (OT)	Montoya	Nassau Veterans Memorial Coliseum	10,888	Recap
49	January 31	7:00pm	@ Carolina	5–2	Poulin	RBC Center	15,575	Recap

February (Games: 14; Home: 7; Road: 7) (Record: 6–6–2; Home: 3–3–1; Road: 3–3–1)

Game	Date	Time (ET)	Opponent	Score	Decision	Location	Attendance	Recap
50	February 3	7:30pm	@ Ottawa	2–1 (OT)	Nabokov	Scotiabank Place	18,252	Recap
51	February 4	7:00pm	Buffalo	3–4 (SO)	Montoya	Nassau Veterans Memorial Coliseum	14,618	Recap
52	February 7	7:00pm	@ Philadelphia	1–0 (SO)	Nabokov	Wells Fargo Center	19,614	Recap
53	February 9	7:00pm	Montreal	2–4	Nabokov	Nassau Veterans Memorial Coliseum	12,312	Recap
54	February 11	1:00pm	Los Angeles	2–1 (OT)	Nabokov	Nassau Veterans Memorial Coliseum	13,079	Recap
55	February 12	3:00pm	Florida	1–4	Nabokov	Nassau Veterans Memorial Coliseum	14,179	Recap
56	February 14	8:30pm	@ Winnipeg	3–1	Nabokov	MTS Center	15,004	Recap
57	February 16	8:00pm	@ St. Louis	1–5	Montoya	Scottrade Center	18,434	Recap
58	February 18	7:00pm	Carolina	4–3	Poulin	Nassau Veterans Memorial Coliseum	11,818	Recap
59	February 20	1:00pm	Ottawa	0–6	Poulin	Nassau Veterans Memorial Coliseum	15,818	Recap
60	February 21	7:00pm	@ Buffalo	1–2	Poulin	First Niagara Center	18,690	Recap
61	February 24	7:00pm	NY Rangers	4–3 (SO)	Nabokov	Nassau Veterans Memorial Coliseum	16,250	Recap
62	February 26	5:00pm	@ Ottawa	2–5	Nabokov	Scotiabank Place	19,660	Recap
63	February 28	7:00pm	@ Washington	2–3 (OT)	Nabokov	Verizon Center	18,506	Recap

March (Games: 15; Home: 6; Road: 9) (Record: 7–6–2; Home: 2–3–1; Road: 5–3–1)

Game	Date	Time (ET)	Opponent	Score	Decision	Location	Attendance	Recap
64	March 1	7:00pm	@ Philadelphia	3–6	Nabokov	Wells Fargo Center	19,674	Recap
65	March 3	1:00pm	@ Boston	3–2	Nabokov	TD Garden	17,565	Recap
66	March 4	3:00pm	New Jersey	1–0	Nilsson	Nassau Veterans Memorial Coliseum	16,250	Recap
67	March 8	7:00pm	@ New Jersey	1–5	Nabokov	Prudential Center	14,573	Recap
68	March 10	7:00pm	New Jersey	1–2	Nilsson	Nassau Veterans Memorial Coliseum	16,250	Recap
69	March 11	7:00pm	@ NY Rangers	3–4 (OT)	Nabokov	Madison Square Garden	18,200	Recap
70	March 13	7:00pm	Washington	4–5 (SO)	Nabokov	Nassau Veterans Memorial Coliseum	11,488	Recap
71	March 15	7:00pm	Philadelphia	2–3	Nabokov	Nassau Veterans Memorial Coliseum	13,827	Recap
72	March 17	7:00pm	@ Montreal	3–2 (SO)	Montoya	Bell Centre	21,273	Recap
73	March 20	7:00pm	@ Toronto	5–2	Nabokov	Air Canada Centre	19,351	Recap
74	March 24	7:00pm	@ Tampa Bay	3–4	Montoya	St. Pete Times Forum	19,204	Recap
75	March 25	5:00pm	@ Florida	3–2 (SO)	Nabokov	BankAtlantic Center	16,814	Recap
76	March 27	7:00pm	@ Pittsburgh	5–3	Nabokov	Consol Energy Center	18,588	Recap
77	March 29	7:00pm	Pittsburgh	5–3	Montoya	Nassau Veterans Memorial Coliseum	12,018	Recap
78	March 31	1:00pm	Boston	3–6	Montoya	Nassau Veterans Memorial Coliseum	16,250	Recap

April (Games: 4; Home: 2; Road: 2) (Record: 1–3–0; Home: 1–1–0; Road: 0–2–0)

Game	Date	Time (ET)	Opponent	Score	Decision	Location	Attendance	Recap
79	April 1	3:00pm	Ottawa	1–5	Montoya	Nassau Veterans Memorial Coliseum	14,210	Recap
80	April 3	7:00pm	@ New Jersey	1–3	Montoya	Prudential Center	15,482	Recap
81	April 5	7:00pm	Winnipeg	5–4	Montoya	Nassau Veterans Memorial Coliseum	13,048	Recap
82	April 7	7:00pm	@ Columbus	3–7	Montoya	Nationwide Arena	17,652	Recap

== Player statistics ==
=== Skaters ===
Note: GP = Games played; G = Goals; A = Assists; Pts = Points; +/− = Plus/minus; PIM = Penalty minutes

Regular season

Number	Position	Player	GP	G	A	Pts	+/−	PIM
91	C	John Tavares	82	31	50	81	-6	26
26	LW	Matt Moulson	82	36	33	69	1	6
15	RW	P. A. Parenteau	80	18	49	67	−8	89
2	D	Mark Streit	82	7	40	47	−27	46
51	C	Frans Nielsen	82	17	30	47	−3	6
21	RW	Kyle Okposo	79	24	21	45	−15	46
40	RW	Michael Grabner	78	20	12	32	−18	12
12	C	Josh Bailey	80	13	19	32	−10	32
3	D	Travis Hamonic	73	2	22	24	6	73
47	D	Andrew MacDonald	75	5	14	19	−5	26
17	LW	Matt Martin	80	7	7	14	−17	121
27	D	Milan Jurcina	65	3	8	11	−34	30
11	RW	Brian Rolston^{‡}	49	4	5	9	−12	6
24	D	Steve Staios	65	0	8	8	−19	53
41	LW	David Ullstrom	29	4	4	8	-2	6
42	D	Dylan Reese	28	1	6	7	0	11
16	C	Marty Reasoner	61	1	5	6	−25	34
4	D	Mark Eaton	62	1	3	4	−17	10
53	C	Casey Cizikas	15	0	4	4	1	6
29	LW	Jay Pandolfo	62	1	2	3	−14	8
10	D	Mike Mottau^{‡}	29	0	2	2	−10	15
25	RW	Nino Niederreiter	55	1	0	1	−29	12
36	RW	Tim Wallace^{‡}	31	0	1	1	−7	6
14	LW	Trevor Gillies	3	0	0	0	−1	0
49	RW	Rhett Rakhshani	5	0	0	0	0	2
6	D	Ty Wishart	1	0	0	0	0	0
18	LW	Micheal Haley	14	0	0	0	-1	57
55	D	Aaron Ness	9	0	0	0	0	2
46	D	Matt Donovan	3	0	0	0	-3	0
44	D	Calvin de Haan	1	0	0	0	1	0
57	RW	Blake Comeau^{‡}	16	0	0	0	−11	6

=== Goaltenders ===
Note: GP = Games played; TOI = Time on ice (minutes); W = Wins; L = Losses; OT = Overtime losses; GA = Goals against; GAA= Goals against average; SA= Shots against; SV= Saves; Sv% = Save percentage; SO= Shutouts

#	Player	GP	TOI	W	L	OT	GA	GAA	SA	Sv%	SO	G	A	PIM
20	Evgeni Nabokov	42	2378	19	18	3	101	2.55	1172	.914	2	0	0	6
35	Al Montoya	31	1720	9	11	5	89	3.10	832	.893	0	0	0	2
39	Rick DiPietro	8	354	3	2	3	22	3.73	177	.876	0	0	2	0
60	Kevin Poulin	6	296	2	4	0	15	3.04	162	.907	0	0	0	0
45	Anders Nilsson	4	218	1	2	0	10	2.75	112	.911	1	0	0	0

^{†}Denotes player spent time with another team before joining Islanders. Stats reflect time with Islanders only.
^{‡}Traded mid-season. Stats reflect time with Islanders only.

== Awards and records ==
=== Awards ===
Regular Season
Player	Award	Reached
John Tavares	NHL Second Star of the Week	October 17, 2011
Matt Moulson	NHL First Star of the Week	December 5, 2011
Evgeni Nabokov	NHL Third Star of the Week	January 23, 2012
John Tavares	NHL First Star of the Month	January 2012

=== Milestones ===
Regular Season
Player	Milestone	Reached
Michael Grabner	100th Career NHL Game	October 15, 2011
Matt Moulson	200th Career NHL Game	October 25, 2011
Kyle Okposo	200th Career NHL Game	October 27, 2011
Brian Rolston	1,200th Career NHL Game	November 15, 2011
Jay Pandolfo	100th Career NHL Goal	November 17, 2011
Anders Nilsson	1st Career NHL Game	November 19, 2011
David Ullstrom	1st Career NHL Game	November 21, 2011
David Ullstrom	1st Career NHL Assist; 1st Career NHL Point	November 29, 2011
David Ullstrom	1st Career NHL Goal	December 6, 2011
Matt Martin	100th Career NHL Game	December 10, 2011
Calvin de Haan	1st Career NHL Game	December 15, 2011
Mike Mottau	300th Career NHL Game	December 15, 2011
Travis Hamonic	100th Career NHL Game	January 6, 2012
Mark Streit	400th Career NHL Game	January 7, 2012
John Tavares	200th Career NHL Game	January 7, 2012
Evgeni Nabokov	300th Career NHL Win	January 14, 2012
Milan Jurcina	400th Career NHL Game	January 17, 2012
P. A. Parenteau	100th Career NHL Point	January 17, 2012
Josh Bailey	100th Career NHL Point	January 19, 2012
Mark Eaton	600th Career NHL Game	February 3, 2012
Aaron Ness	1st Career NHL Game	February 7, 2012
John Tavares	100th Career NHL Assist	February 9, 2012
Casey Cizikas	1st Career NHL Game	February 24, 2012
Frans Nielsen	300th Career NHL Game; 100th Career NHL Assist	February 28, 2012
Casey Cizikas	1st Career NHL Assist; 1st Career NHL Point	March 1, 2012
Anders Nilsson	1st Career NHL Win; 1st Career NHL Shutout	March 4, 2012
Evgeni Nabokov	600th Career NHL Game	March 11, 2012
Matt Moulson	100th Career NHL Goal	March 24, 2012
Mark Streit	200th Career NHL Assist	March 29, 2012
Matt Donovan	1st Career NHL Game	April 3, 2012
John Tavares	200th Career NHL Point	April 3, 2012
Steve Staios	1,000th Career NHL Game	April 5, 2012

== Transactions ==
The Islanders have been involved in the following transactions during the 2011–12 season:

=== Trades ===
Date	Details
June 25, 2011	To Tampa Bay Lightning Bruno Gervais	To New York Islanders Future considerations
June 28, 2011	To Vancouver Canucks 4th-round pick in 2012	To New York Islanders Christian Ehrhoff (Note: Trade of negotiating rights to.)
June 29, 2011	To Buffalo Sabres Christian Ehrhoff (Note: Trade of negotiating rights to.)	To New York Islanders 4th-round pick in 2012
July 28, 2011	To New Jersey Devils Trent Hunter; Conditional pick in 2012 (Note: Condition not satisfied.)	To New York Islanders Brian Rolston
September 9, 2011	To Chicago Blackhawks David Toews	To New York Islanders Future considerations
February 27, 2012	To Boston Bruins Mike Mottau; Brian Rolston	To New York Islanders Marc Cantin; Yannick Riendeau
March 20, 2012	To Boston Bruins Future considerations	To New York Islanders Yury Alexandrov

=== Free agents signed ===
Player	Former team	Contract terms
Marty Reasoner	Florida Panthers	2 years, $2.7 million
Trevor Frischmon	Springfield Falcons	1 year, $615,000
Tim Wallace	Pittsburgh Penguins	1 year, $700,000
Sean Backman	Texas Stars	1 year, $525,000
Steve Staios	Calgary Flames	1 year, $800,000
Jay Pandolfo	Springfield Falcons	1 year, $600,000
Mike Halmo	Owen Sound Attack	3 years; $2,592,500; entry-level contract
John Grahame	Lake Erie Monsters	1 year, $525,000
Blair Riley	Bridgeport Sound Tigers	1 year, $580,000

=== Free agents lost ===
Player	New team	Contract terms
Robin Figren	Linköpings HC	2 years
Rob Hisey	Black Wings Linz	1 year
Zenon Konopka	Ottawa Senators	1 year, $700,000
Nathan Lawson	Montreal Canadiens	1 year, $525,000
Radek Martinek	Columbus Blue Jackets	1 year, $2.2 million
Jack Hillen	Nashville Predators	1 year, $650,000
Jesse Joensuu	HV71	undisclosed

=== Claimed via waivers ===
Player	Former team	Date claimed off waivers

=== Lost via waivers ===
Player	New team	Date claimed off waivers
Blake Comeau	Calgary Flames	November 25, 2011
Tim Wallace	Tampa Bay Lightning	February 23, 2012

=== Lost via retirement ===
Player
Doug Weight

=== Player signings ===
Player	Date	Contract terms
Michael Grabner	May 13, 2011	5 years, $15 million
Kyle Okposo	May 25, 2011	5 years, $14 million
Anders Nilsson	May 27, 2011	3 years, $2.7 million entry-level contract
Casey Cizikas	May 31, 2011	3 years, $2.38 million entry-level contract
Trevor Gillies	June 17, 2011	1 year, $625,000
Tomas Marcinko	June 27, 2011	1 year, $605,000
Kirill Kabanov	July 1, 2011	3 years, $2.7 million entry-level contract
Jeremy Colliton	July 14, 2011	1 year, $600,000
Micheal Haley	July 15, 2011	1 year, $550,000
Dylan Reese	July 15, 2011	1 year, $635,250
Ty Wishart	July 15, 2011	1 year, $803,250
Blake Comeau	August 2, 2011	1 year, $2.5 million
John Tavares	September 15, 2011	6 years, $33 million contract extension
Josh Bailey	September 16, 2011	2 years, $2.1 million
Ryan Strome	October 4, 2011	3 years, $2.775 million entry-level contract
Frans Nielsen	February 8, 2012	4 years, $11 million contract extension
Evgeni Nabokov	March 21, 2012	1 year, $2.75 million contract extension
Brock Nelson	April 3, 2012	3 years, $2.7 million entry-level contract
John Persson	May 29, 2012	3 years, $1.88 million entry-level contract
Johan Sundstrom	June 11, 2012	3 years, $2.31 million entry-level contract

== Draft picks ==
Round	Pick #	Player	Nationality	Position	Prior team	Prior league
1	5	Ryan Strome	Canada	C	Niagara IceDogs	OHL
2	34	Scott Mayfield	United States	D	Youngstown Phantoms	USHL
2	50 (from Montreal)	Johan Sundstrom	Sweden	C	Frölunda HC	Elitserien
3	63 (from Colorado)	Andrey Pedan	Russia	D	Guelph Storm	OHL
4	95	Robbie Russo	United States	D	U.S. National Team Development Program	USHL
5	125	John Persson	Sweden	LW	Red Deer Rebels	WHL
5	127 (from Winnipeg)	Brenden Kichton	Canada	D	Spokane Chiefs	WHL
7	185	Mitchell Theoret	Canada	C	Niagara IceDogs	OHL

== See also ==
- 2011–12 NHL season
