= 2011–12 Carolina Hurricanes season =

National Hockey League team season

2011–12 Carolina Hurricanes
- Division: 5th Southeast
- Conference: 12th Eastern
- 2011–12 record: 33–33–16
- Home record: 20–14–7
- Road record: 13–19–9
- Goals for: 213
- Goals against: 243

Team information
- General manager: Jim Rutherford
- Coach: Paul Maurice (Oct.–Nov.); Kirk Muller (Nov.–Apr.)
- Captain: Eric Staal
- Alternate captains: Tim Gleason; Brandon Sutter
- Arena: PNC Arena
- Average attendance: 16,042 (85.9%)

Team leaders
- Goals: Eric Staal (24)
- Assists: Eric Staal (46)
- Points: Eric Staal (70)
- Penalty minutes: Bryan Allen (76)
- Plus/minus: Tim Gleason (12)
- Wins: Cam Ward (30)
- Goals against average: Cam Ward (2.74)

The 2011–12 Carolina Hurricanes season was the 40th season for the franchise, 33rd in the National Hockey League (NHL) dating back to June 22, 1979, and 14th season since the franchise relocated to North Carolina to start the 1997–98 NHL season.

The Hurricanes failed to qualify for the Stanley Cup playoffs for the third straight year. The last time the team made the trip to the playoffs was in the 2008–09 season.

== Regular season ==
On November 28, 2011, the Hurricanes replaced head coach Paul Maurice with Kirk Muller.

== Playoffs ==
The Hurricanes failed to qualify for the 2012 Stanley Cup playoffs.

== Standings ==
Southeast Division
Pos	Team	GP	W	L	OTL	ROW	GF	GA	GD	Pts
1	y – Florida Panthers	82	38	26	18	32	203	227	−24	94
2	x – Washington Capitals	82	42	32	8	38	222	230	−8	92
3	Tampa Bay Lightning	82	38	36	8	35	235	281	−46	84
4	Winnipeg Jets	82	37	35	10	33	225	246	−21	84
5	Carolina Hurricanes	82	33	33	16	32	213	243	−30	82

Source: National Hockey League
x – Clinched playoff spot; y – Clinched division

Eastern Conference
Pos	Div	Team	GP	W	L	OTL	ROW	GF	GA	GD	Pts
1	AT	z – New York Rangers	82	51	24	7	47	226	187	+39	109
2	NE	y – Boston Bruins	82	49	29	4	40	269	202	+67	102
3	SE	y – Florida Panthers	82	38	26	18	32	203	227	−24	94
4	AT	x – Pittsburgh Penguins	82	51	25	6	42	282	221	+61	108
5	AT	x – Philadelphia Flyers	82	47	26	9	43	264	232	+32	103
6	AT	x – New Jersey Devils	82	48	28	6	36	228	209	+19	102
7	SE	x – Washington Capitals	82	42	32	8	38	222	230	−8	92
8	NE	x – Ottawa Senators	82	41	31	10	35	249	240	+9	92
9	NE	Buffalo Sabres	82	39	32	11	32	218	230	−12	89
10	SE	Tampa Bay Lightning	82	38	36	8	35	235	281	−46	84
11	SE	Winnipeg Jets	82	37	35	10	33	225	246	−21	84
12	SE	Carolina Hurricanes	82	33	33	16	32	213	243	−30	82
13	NE	Toronto Maple Leafs	82	35	37	10	31	231	264	−33	80
14	AT	New York Islanders	82	34	37	11	27	203	255	−52	79
15	NE	Montreal Canadiens	82	31	35	16	26	212	226	−14	78

Source: National Hockey League
x – Clinched playoff spot; y – Clinched division; z – Clinched conference

== Schedule and results ==
=== Pre-season ===
2011 Pre-season game log: 1–4–1 (Home: 1–2–0; Road: 0–2–1)
#	Date	Visitor	Score	Home	OT	Decision	Record	Recap
1	September 19	Carolina Hurricanes	1–3	Buffalo Sabres		Peters	0–1–0
2	September 23	Nashville Predators	3–2	Carolina Hurricanes		Peters	0–2–0
3	September 25 (in Charlotte, NC)	Winnipeg Jets	0–4	Carolina Hurricanes		Ward	1–2–0
4	September 28	Carolina Hurricanes	1–3	Winnipeg Jets		Boucher	1–3–0
5	September 30	Columbus Blue Jackets	3–2	Carolina Hurricanes		Ward	1–4–0
6	October 1	Carolina Hurricanes	1–2	Nashville Predators	OT	Boucher	1–4–1

=== Regular season ===
Win (2 points) Loss (0 points) Overtime/shootout loss (1 point)

2011–12 Game Log

October: 4–4–3 (Home: 2–1–1; Road: 2–3–2)
#	Date	Visitor	Score	Home	OT	Decision	Attendance	Record	Pts	Recap
1	October 7	Tampa Bay Lightning	5–1	Carolina Hurricanes		Ward	18,680	0–1–0	0
2	October 8	Carolina Hurricanes	3–4	Washington Capitals	OT	Boucher	18,506	0–1–1	1
3	October 10	Carolina Hurricanes	2–4	New Jersey Devils		Ward	12,096	0–2–1	1
4	October 12	Boston Bruins	2–3	Carolina Hurricanes		Ward	16,483	1–2–1	3
5	October 14	Carolina Hurricanes	4–3	Buffalo Sabres		Ward	18,690	2–2–1	5
6	October 18	Carolina Hurricanes	4–1	Boston Bruins		Ward	17,565	3–2–1	7
7	October 21	Carolina Hurricanes	2–3	St. Louis Blues	OT	Ward	19,150	3–2–2	8
8	October 22	Carolina Hurricanes	3–5	Winnipeg Jets		Boucher	15,004	3–3–2	8
9	October 25	Ottawa Senators	3–2	Carolina Hurricanes	SO	Ward	12,083	3–3–3	9
10	October 28	Chicago Blackhawks	0–3	Carolina Hurricanes		Ward	16,056	4–3–3	11
11	October 29	Carolina Hurricanes	1–5	Philadelphia Flyers		Boucher	19,683	4–4–3	11

November: 4–10–1 (Home: 3–6–1; Road: 1–4–0)
#	Date	Visitor	Score	Home	OT	Decision	Attendance	Record	Pts	Recap
12	November 1	Tampa Bay Lightning	2–4	Carolina Hurricanes		Ward	13,374	5–4–3	13
13	November 4	Washington Capitals	5–1	Carolina Hurricanes		Ward	14,589	5–5–3	13
14	November 6	Dallas Stars	5–2	Carolina Hurricanes		Ward	14,815	5–6–3	13
15	November 8	Carolina Hurricanes	2–3	New Jersey Devils		Ward	13,056	5–7–3	13
16	November 11	Carolina Hurricanes	1–5	New York Rangers		Ward	18,200	5–8–3	13
17	November 12	Pittsburgh Penguins	3–5	Carolina Hurricanes		Ward	16,260	6–8–3	15
18	November 14	Philadelphia Flyers	5–3	Carolina Hurricanes		Ward	14,491	6–9–3	15
19	November 16	Carolina Hurricanes	0–4	Montreal Canadiens		Ward	21,273	6–10–3	15
20	November 18	Buffalo Sabres	1–0	Carolina Hurricanes		Boucher	15,072	6–11–3	15
21	November 20	Toronto Maple Leafs	2–3	Carolina Hurricanes		Ward	13,187	7–11–3	17
22	November 21	Carolina Hurricanes	4–2	Philadelphia Flyers		Ward	19,632	8–11–3	19
23	November 23	Montreal Canadiens	4–3	Carolina Hurricanes	SO	Ward	14,862	8–11–4	20
24	November 25	Winnipeg Jets	3–1	Carolina Hurricanes		Ward	15,718	8–12–4	20
25	November 27	Carolina Hurricanes	3–4	Ottawa Senators		Ward	19,656	8–13–4	20
26	November 29	Florida Panthers	3–1	Carolina Hurricanes		Ward	13,065	8–14–4	20

December: 5–7–2 (Home: 4–3–0; Road: 1–4–2)
#	Date	Visitor	Score	Home	OT	Decision	Attendance	Record	Pts	Recap
27	December 1	New York Rangers	5–3	Carolina Hurricanes		Ward	12,566	8–15–4	20
28	December 3	Pittsburgh Penguins	3–2	Carolina Hurricanes		Boucher	17,696	8–16–4	20
29	December 6	Carolina Hurricanes	6–7	Calgary Flames		Murphy	19,289	8–17–4	20
30	December 7	Carolina Hurricanes	5–3	Edmonton Oilers		Ward	16,839	9–17–4	22
31	December 9	Carolina Hurricanes	2–4	Winnipeg Jets		Ward	15,004	9–18–4	22
32	December 13	Carolina Hurricanes	1–2	Toronto Maple Leafs	OT	Ward	19,509	9–18–5	23
33	December 15	Vancouver Canucks	3–4	Carolina Hurricanes		Ward	15,292	10–18–5	25
34	December 18	Carolina Hurricanes	2–3	Florida Panthers	OT	Ward	15,289	10–18–6	26
35	December 21	Phoenix Coyotes	4–3	Carolina Hurricanes		Ward	15,848	10–19–6	26
36	December 23	Ottawa Senators	1–2	Carolina Hurricanes	OT	Ward	14,556	11–19–6	28
37	December 26	New Jersey Devils	2–4	Carolina Hurricanes		Ward	16,121	12–19–6	30
38	December 27	Carolina Hurricanes	2–4	Pittsburgh Penguins		Peters	18,600	12–20–6	30
39	December 29	Toronto Maple Leafs	3–4	Carolina Hurricanes	OT	Ward	17,461	13–20–6	32
40	December 31	Carolina Hurricanes	2–5	Tampa Bay Lightning		Ward	19,204	13–21–6	32

January: 5–4–3 (Home: 4–2–1; Road: 1–2–2)
#	Date	Visitor	Score	Home	OT	Decision	Attendance	Record	Pts	Recap
41	January 3	New York Islanders	4–3	Carolina Hurricanes	SO	Ward	13,828	13–21–7	33
42	January 6	Buffalo Sabres	2–4	Carolina Hurricanes		Ward	16,095	14–21–7	35
43	January 7	Carolina Hurricanes	2–5	Nashville Predators		Peters	17,113	14–22–7	35
44	January 10	Philadelphia Flyers	2–1	Carolina Hurricanes		Ward	14,511	14–23–7	35
45	January 12	Carolina Hurricanes	5–2	Tampa Bay Lightning		Ward	16,553	15–23–7	37
46	January 14	Boston Bruins	2–4	Carolina Hurricanes		Ward	18,680	16–23–7	39
47	January 15	Carolina Hurricanes	1–2	Washington Capitals		Ward	18,506	16–24–7	39
48	January 17	Carolina Hurricanes	1–2	Pittsburgh Penguins	SO	Ward	18,535	16–24–8	40
49	January 20	Washington Capitals	0–3	Carolina Hurricanes		Ward	17,507	17–24–8	42
50	January 21	Carolina Hurricanes	1–2	New York Islanders	OT	Ward	13,622	17–24–9	43
51	January 23	Winnipeg Jets	1–2	Carolina Hurricanes		Ward	16,045	18–24–9	45
52	January 31	New York Islanders	5–2	Carolina Hurricanes		Ward	15,575	18–25–9	45

February: 6–1–4 (Home: 4–0–2; Road: 2–1–2)
#	Date	Visitor	Score	Home	OT	Decision	Attendance	Record	Pts	Recap
53	February 2	Carolina Hurricanes	3–0	Boston Bruins		Ward	17,565	19–25–9	47
54	February 4	Los Angeles Kings	1–2	Carolina Hurricanes		Ward	18,680	20–25–9	49
55	February 8	Carolina Hurricanes	2–3	Anaheim Ducks	OT	Ward	12,675	20–25–10	50
56	February 10	Carolina Hurricanes	3–4	Colorado Avalanche	OT	Ward	16,854	20–25–11	51
57	February 13	Carolina Hurricanes	5–3	Montreal Canadiens		Ward	21,273	21–25–11	53
58	February 17	San Jose Sharks	2–3	Carolina Hurricanes		Peters	18,680	22–25–11	55
59	February 18	Carolina Hurricanes	3–4	New York Islanders		Peters	11,818	22–26–11	55
60	February 20	Washington Capitals	0–5	Carolina Hurricanes		Peters	16,837	23–26–11	57
61	February 23	Anaheim Ducks	3–2	Carolina Hurricanes	SO	Peters	16,564	23–26–12	58
62	February 25	Florida Panthers	3–2	Carolina Hurricanes	SO	Peters	18,680	23–26–13	59
63	February 28	Nashville Predators	3–4	Carolina Hurricanes		Ward	13,595	24–26–13	61

March: 7–6–3 (Home: 2–2–2; Road: 5–4–1)
#	Date	Visitor	Score	Home	OT	Decision	Attendance	Record	Pts	Recap
64	March 1	New York Rangers	3–2	Carolina Hurricanes		Ward	14,523	24–27–13	61
65	March 3	Tampa Bay Lightning	4–3	Carolina Hurricanes	OT	Ward	17,116	24–27–14	62
66	March 6	Carolina Hurricanes	4–3	Washington Capitals	OT	Ward	18,506	25–27–14	64
67	March 7	Carolina Hurricanes	2–3	Buffalo Sabres	OT	Ward	18,690	25–27–15	65
68	March 10	Carolina Hurricanes	4–2	Tampa Bay Lightning		Ward	18,554	26–27–15	67
69	March 11	Carolina Hurricanes	0–2	Florida Panthers		Ward	15,081	26–28–15	67
70	March 13	Carolina Hurricanes	2–4	New York Rangers		Ward	18,200	26–29–15	67
71	March 15	St. Louis Blues	0–2	Carolina Hurricanes		Ward	18,680	27–29–15	69
72	March 17	Carolina Hurricanes	5–3	Minnesota Wild		Boucher	18,394	28–29–15	71
73	March 18	Carolina Hurricanes	4–3	Winnipeg Jets		Ward	15,004	29–29–15	73
74	March 21	Florida Panthers	1–3	Carolina Hurricanes		Ward	18,680	30–29–15	75
75	March 23	Carolina Hurricanes	1–5	Columbus Blue Jackets		Ward	15,085	30–30–15	75
76	March 24	Carolina Hurricanes	4–5	Detroit Red Wings		Ward	20,066	30–31–15	75
77	March 27	Carolina Hurricanes	3–0	Toronto Maple Leafs		Ward	19,348	31–31–15	77
78	March 30	Winnipeg Jets	4–3	Carolina Hurricanes	OT	Ward	18,680	31–31–16	78
79	March 31	New Jersey Devils	5–0	Carolina Hurricanes		Boucher	18,680	31–32–16	78

April: 2–1–0 (Home: 1–0–0; Road: 1–1–0)
#	Date	Visitor	Score	Home	OT	Decision	Attendance	Record	Pts	Recap
80	April 3	Carolina Hurricanes	2–1	Ottawa Senators		Ward	19,484	32–32–16	80
81	April 5	Montreal Canadiens	1–2	Carolina Hurricanes	SO	Ward	17,846	33–32–16	82
82	April 7	Carolina Hurricanes	1–4	Florida Panthers		Boucher	19,057	33–33–16	82

== Player statistics ==
=== Skaters ===
Note: Pos = Position; GP = Games played; G = Goals; A = Assists; Pts = Points; PIM = Penalty minutes; +/- = Plus/minus; PPG = Power-play goals; SHG = Short-handed goals; GWG = Game-winning goals

Regular season

Player	GP	G	A	Pts	+/−	PIM
Eric Staal	82	24	46	70	−20	48
Jussi Jokinen	79	12	34	46	-2	54
Jeff Skinner	64	20	24	44	−8	56
Jiri Tlusty	79	17	19	36	1	26
Tuomo Ruutu	72	18	16	34	-3	50
Chad LaRose	67	19	13	32	−15	48
Brandon Sutter	82	17	15	32	−3	21
Jamie McBain	76	8	19	27	−7	4
Tim Brent	79	12	12	24	−8	27
Jay Harrison	72	9	14	23	−10	60
Justin Faulk	66	8	14	22	−16	29
Anthony Stewart	77	9	11	20	-2	30
Tim Gleason	82	1	17	18	12	71
Joni Pitkanen	30	5	12	17	−15	16
Alexei Ponikarovsky^{‡}	49	7	8	15	−12	26
Bryan Allen	82	1	13	14	-1	76
Drayson Bowman	37	6	7	13	2	4
Jaroslav Spacek^{†}	34	5	7	12	4	6
Patrick Dwyer	73	5	7	12	0	23
Tomas Kaberle^{‡}	29	0	9	9	−12	2
Andreas Nodl^{†}	48	3	4	7	−4	6
Jerome Samson	16	2	3	5	−3	8
Derek Joslin	44	2	2	4	−15	35
Brett Sutter	15	0	3	3	−1	11
Zac Dalpe	16	1	2	3	−3	4
Zach Boychuk	16	0	2	2	−3	0
Riley Nash	5	0	1	1	1	2
Bobby Sanguinetti	3	0	0	0	0	0
Jeremy Welsh	1	0	0	0	0	4

=== Goaltenders ===
Note: GP = Games played; Min = Minutes played; W = Wins; L = Losses; OT = Overtime losses; GA = Goals against; GAA= Goals against average; SA= Shots against; SV= Saves; Sv% = Save percentage; SO= Shutouts

Regular season

Player	GP	TOI	W	L	OT	GA	GAA	SA	Sv%	SO	G	A	PIM
Cam Ward	68	3988	30	23	13	182	2.74	2143	.915	5	1	0	4
Brian Boucher	10	546	1	6	1	31	3.41	260	.881	0	0	0	0
Justin Peters	7	387	2	3	2	16	2.48	233	.931	1	0	0	0
Mike Murphy	2	36	0	1	0	0	0.00	9	1.000	0	0	0	0

^{†}Denotes player spent time with another team before joining Hurricanes. Stats reflect time with Hurricanes only.
^{‡}Traded mid-season
Bold/italics denotes franchise record

== Awards and records ==
=== Awards ===
Regular Season
Player	Award	Awarded

=== Milestones ===
Regular Season
Player	Milestone	Reached
Justin Faulk	1st Career NHL Game	October 7, 2011
Tim Brent	100th Career NHL Game	October 8, 2011
Jamie McBain	100th Career NHL Game	November 4, 2011
Anthony Stewart	200th Career NHL Game	November 11, 2011
Jussi Jokinen	300th Career NHL Point	November 12, 2011
Jeff Skinner	100th Career NHL Game	November 14, 2011
Justin Faulk	1st Career NHL Assist; 1st Career NHL Point	November 20, 2011
Tim Gleason	500th Career NHL Game	November 27, 2011
Joni Pitkanen	500th Career NHL Game	November 27, 2011
Mike Murphy	1st Career NHL Game	December 6, 2011
Justin Faulk	1st Career NHL Goal	December 9, 2011
Jussi Jokinen	200th Career NHL Assist	December 13, 2011
Riley Nash	1st Career NHL Game	December 21, 2011
Riley Nash	1st Career NHL Assist; 1st Career NHL Point	December 23, 2011
Cam Ward	1st Career NHL Goal	December 26, 2011
Eric Staal	600th Career NHL Game	December 31, 2011
Tuomo Ruutu	500th Career NHL Game	December 31, 2011
Jerome Samson	1st Career NHL Goal	January 10, 2012
Eric Staal	300th Career NHL Assist	January 12, 2012
Alexei Ponikarovsky	600th Career NHL Game	January 14, 2012
Jussi Jokinen	500th Career NHL Game	January 14, 2012
Jiri Tlusty	200th Career NHL Game	January 23, 2012
Tim Gleason	100th Career NHL Assist	January 31, 2012
Patrick Dwyer	200th Career NHL Game	February 4, 2012
Justin Peters	1st Career NHL Shutout	February 20, 2012
Cam Ward	400th Career NHL Game	March 3, 2012
Derek Joslin	100th Career NHL Game	March 6, 2012
Brandon Sutter	100th Career NHL Point	March 6, 2012
Jeff Skinner	100th Career NHL Point	March 7, 2012
Cam Ward	200th Career NHL Win	March 15, 2012
Jay Harrison	200th Career NHL Game	April 3, 2012
Bryan Allen	600th Career NHL Game	April 5, 2012
Jeremy Welsh	1st Career NHL Game	April 7, 2012

== Transactions ==
The Hurricanes have been involved in the following transactions during the 2011–12 season.

=== Trades ===
Date	Details
July 5, 2011	To Boston Bruins Joe Corvo	To Carolina Hurricanes 4th-round pick in 2012
December 9, 2011	To Montreal Canadiens Tomas Kaberle	To Carolina Hurricanes Jaroslav Spacek
January 18, 2012	To Florida Panthers Mattias Lindstrom; Jon Matsumoto	To Carolina Hurricanes Evgenii Dadonov; A. J. Jenks
January 20, 2012	To New Jersey Devils Alexei Ponikarovsky	To Carolina Hurricanes Joe Sova; 4th-round pick in 2012

=== Free agents acquired ===
Player	Former team	Contract terms
Brian Boucher	Philadelphia Flyers	2 years, $1.9 million
Tim Brent	Toronto Maple Leafs	2 years, $1.5 million
Alexei Ponikarovsky	Los Angeles Kings	1 year, $1.5 million
Justin Soryal	Connecticut Whale	1 year, $525,000
Anthony Stewart	Atlanta Thrashers	2 years, $1.8 million
Tomas Kaberle	Boston Bruins	3 years, $12.75 million
Chris Durno	Norfolk Admirals	1 year, $525,000
Mathieu Roy	Tampa Bay Lightning	1 year, $600,000
Jeremy Welsh	Union College	1 year, $832,500 entry-level contract
Beau Schmitz	Plymouth Whalers	3 years, $1.575 million entry-level contract
John Muse	Charlotte Checkers	1 year, $525,000

=== Free agents lost ===
Player	New team	Contract terms
Erik Cole	Montreal Canadiens	4 years, $18 million
Bryan Rodney	Anaheim Ducks	1 year, $525,000
Justin Pogge	Phoenix Coyotes	1 year, $575,000
Troy Bodie	Anaheim Ducks	1 year, $550,000

=== Claimed via waivers ===
Player	Former team	Date claimed off waivers
Andreas Nodl	Philadelphia Flyers	November 29, 2011

=== Lost via waivers ===
Player	New team	Date claimed off waivers

=== Lost via retirement ===
Player

=== Player signings ===
Player	Date	Contract terms
Tommi Kivisto	June 1, 2011	3 years, $1.695 million entry-level contract
Mattias Lindstrom	June 1, 2011	3 years, $1.72 million entry-level contract
Jay Harrison	June 16, 2011	2 years, $1.4 million
Patrick Dwyer	June 28, 2011	2 years, $1.25 million
Joni Pitkanen	June 28, 2011	3 years, $13.5 million
Chad LaRose	June 29, 2011	2 years, $3.4 million
Jussi Jokinen	June 30, 2011	3 years, $9 million
Jiri Tlusty	July 1, 2011	1 year, $525,000
Brett Bellemore	July 8, 2011	2 years, $1.05 million
Derek Joslin	July 8, 2011	2 years, $1.4 million
Brandon Sutter	July 13, 2011	3 years, $6.2 million
Brett Sutter	July 15, 2011	1 year, $525,000
Bobby Sanguinetti	July 15, 2011	1 year, $600,000
Ryan Murphy	September 16, 2011	3 years, $2.4975 million entry-level contract
Victor Rask	October 20, 2011	3 years, $1.95 million entry-level contract
Tim Gleason	January 30, 2012	4 years, $16 million contract extension
Tuomo Ruutu	February 22, 2012	4 years, $19 million contract extension
Austin Levi	March 16, 2012	3 years, $1.65 million entry-level contract

== Draft picks ==
The 2011 NHL entry draft was held in St. Paul, Minnesota.

Round	#	Player	Position	Nationality	College/Junior/Club team (League)
1	12	Ryan Murphy	D	Canada	Kitchener Rangers (OHL)
2	42	Victor Rask	C	Sweden	Leksands IF (Swe-2)
3	73	Keegan Lowe	D	United States	Edmonton Oil Kings (WHL)
4	103	Gregory Hofmann	C	Switzerland	HC Ambri-Piotta (NLA)
6	163	Matt Mahalak	G	United States	Plymouth Whalers (OHL)
7	193	Brody Sutter	C	Canada	Lethbridge Hurricanes (WHL)
