= Bracken Kearns =

Canadian ice hockey player (born 1981)

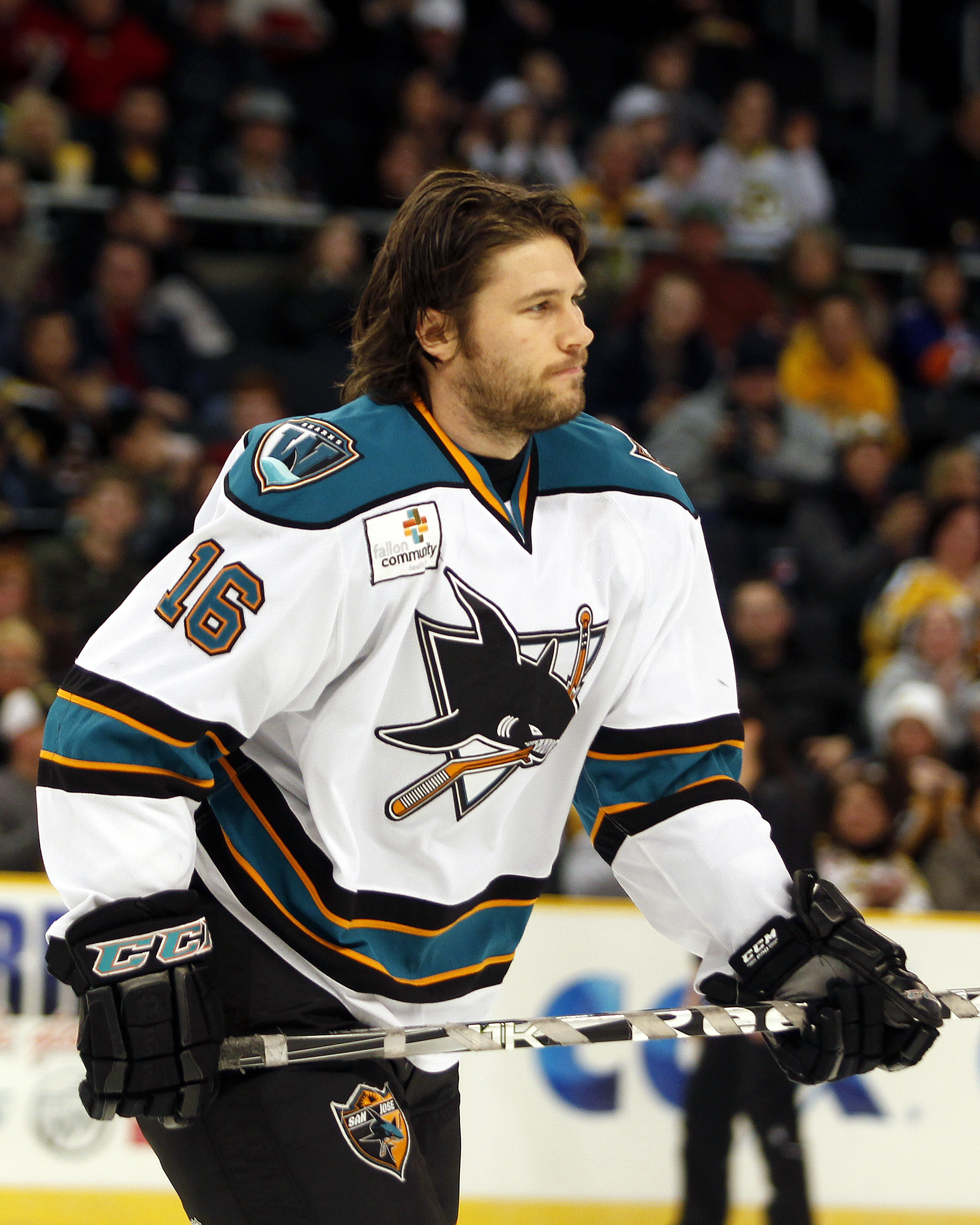
- Born: May 12, 1981 (age 45) Vancouver, British Columbia, Canada
- Height: 6 ft 0 in (183 cm)
- Weight: 195 lb (88 kg; 13 st 13 lb)
- Position: Centre
- Shot: Left
- Played for: Florida Panthers; San Jose Sharks; Espoo Blues; New York Islanders; EHC Black Wings Linz
- NHL draft: Undrafted
- Playing career: 2005–2019

Bracken Kearns (born May 12, 1981) is a Canadian former professional ice hockey player. Along with an extensive minor league career, he played for the Florida Panthers, San Jose Sharks and New York Islanders of the National Hockey League (NHL).

== Playing career ==
=== Amateur ===
Kearns, who graduated from the University of Calgary in 2005 with a degree in economics, was captain of the Calgary Dinos men's ice hockey team.

=== Professional ===
Kearns made his professional debut with the Toledo Storm during the 2005–06 ECHL season. He spent the entire 2006–07 season in the American Hockey League (AHL) with Milwaukee Admirals. During the 2007–08 season, he played 53 games in the AHL with the Norfolk Admirals and also played 17 games in the ECHL with the Reading Royals. He played AHL hockey for the next two years with Norfolk and the Rockford IceHogs.

On July 27, 2010, Kearns was signed as a free agent by the Phoenix Coyotes who assigned him to their AHL affiliate in San Antonio for the start of the 2010–11 AHL season.

On July 14, 2011, Kearns signed a one-year, two-way contract with the Florida Panthers. During the 2011–12 season on October 20, 2011, at the age of 30, Kearns made his NHL debut with the Panthers playing seven shifts for 6:30 of ice time in a 3–0 loss to the Buffalo Sabres. Kearns was the second oldest player to make his NHL debut with the Panthers, behind only Magnus Svensson who made his NHL debut with Florida in 1995 at the age of 32. Kearns went scoreless in 5 games with the Panthers, before returning to the Rampage to be among the offensive leaders with 52 points in 69 games.

On July 2, 2012, Kearns was again on the move, signing a one-year free agent contract with the San Jose Sharks. With the 2012 NHL lockout in effect, Kearns reported directly to AHL affiliate, the Worcester Sharks, to begin the 2012–13 season.

Kearns was recalled from Worcester on December 28, 2013. The next day, Kearns scored his first NHL goal in the San Jose Sharks 3-1 victory over the Anaheim Ducks against goaltender Frederik Andersen. He became the oldest player in Sharks history to score his first NHL goal (32 years, 231 days), besting the previous record holder Jay Leach (30 years, 190 days). On February 24, 2014, Kearns was sent to waivers by the Sharks.

As a free agent from the Sharks, Kearns accepted a try-out contract to the Boston Bruins training camp for the 2014–15 season. Following camp, Kearns was released by the Bruins and after spending his entire professional career in North America, he opted to pursue a European career in agreeing to a one-year contract in the Finnish Liiga with the Espoo Blues on October 23, 2014.

After a successful season with the Blues, Kearns returned to North America on July 2, 2015, signing a one-year, two-way contract with the New York Islanders. On June 1, 2016, Kearns signed a new one-year, two-way contract with the Islanders.

Kearns played two seasons within the Islanders before leaving as a free agent to sign a one-year, two-way contract with the New Jersey Devils on July 1, 2017. In the 2017–18 season, Kearns was assigned to AHL affiliate, the Binghamton Devils for their inaugural season. Among the club's scoring leaders he registered 43 points in 67 games.

As a free agent, Kearns left North America in the off-season, agreeing to a one-year pact with Austrian outfit, EHC Black Wings Linz of the EBEL, on July 23, 2018.

On August 25, 2019, Kearns announced his retirement from professional hockey.

== Family ==
Kearns' father is Dennis Kearns, a retired All-Star defenceman for the Vancouver Canucks.

== Career statistics ==
			Regular season					Playoffs
Season	Team	League	GP	G	A	Pts	PIM	GP	G	A	Pts	PIM
2001–02	University of Calgary	CIS	26	0	8	8	2	—	—	—	—	—
2002–03	University of Calgary	CIS	29	8	9	17	14	—	—	—	—	—
2003–04	University of Calgary	CIS	38	11	12	23	22	—	—	—	—	—
2004–05	University of Calgary	CIS	43	12	23	35	18	—	—	—	—	—
2005–06	Toledo Storm	ECHL	71	33	36	69	66	13	7	6	13	6
2005–06	Cleveland Barons	AHL	1	0	1	1	0	—	—	—	—	—
2006–07	Milwaukee Admirals	AHL	79	11	15	26	59	4	0	0	0	8
2007–08	Reading Royals	ECHL	17	5	13	18	17	—	—	—	—	—
2007–08	Norfolk Admirals	AHL	53	9	16	25	40	—	—	—	—	—
2008–09	Norfolk Admirals	AHL	53	12	10	22	63	—	—	—	—	—
2009–10	Rockford IceHogs	AHL	80	15	36	51	99	4	0	2	2	2
2010–11	San Antonio Rampage	AHL	72	20	23	43	104	—	—	—	—	—
2011–12	San Antonio Rampage	AHL	69	22	30	52	58	10	2	5	7	4
2011–12	Florida Panthers	NHL	5	0	0	0	10	—	—	—	—	—
2012–13	Worcester Sharks	AHL	66	21	25	46	73	—	—	—	—	—
2012–13	San Jose Sharks	NHL	1	0	0	0	0	7	0	0	0	2
2012–13	Worcester Sharks	AHL	45	6	19	25	72	—	—	—	—	—
2013–14	San Jose Sharks	NHL	25	3	2	5	6	—	—	—	—	—
2014–15	Espoo Blues	Liiga	45	10	10	20	38	4	0	0	0	0
2015–16	Bridgeport Sound Tigers	AHL	73	23	30	53	76	3	0	2	2	2
2015–16	New York Islanders	NHL	2	0	1	1	4	—	—	—	—	—
2016–17	Bridgeport Sound Tigers	AHL	74	23	28	51	43	—	—	—	—	—
2016–17	New York Islanders	NHL	2	0	0	0	2	—	—	—	—	—
2017–18	Binghamton Devils	AHL	67	14	29	43	32	—	—	—	—	—
2018–19	EHC Black Wings Linz	EBEL	45	9	14	23	29	6	0	0	0	4
NHL totals			35	3	3	6	22	7	0	0	0	2
