= Jonas Gustavsson =

Swedish ice hockey player (born 1984)

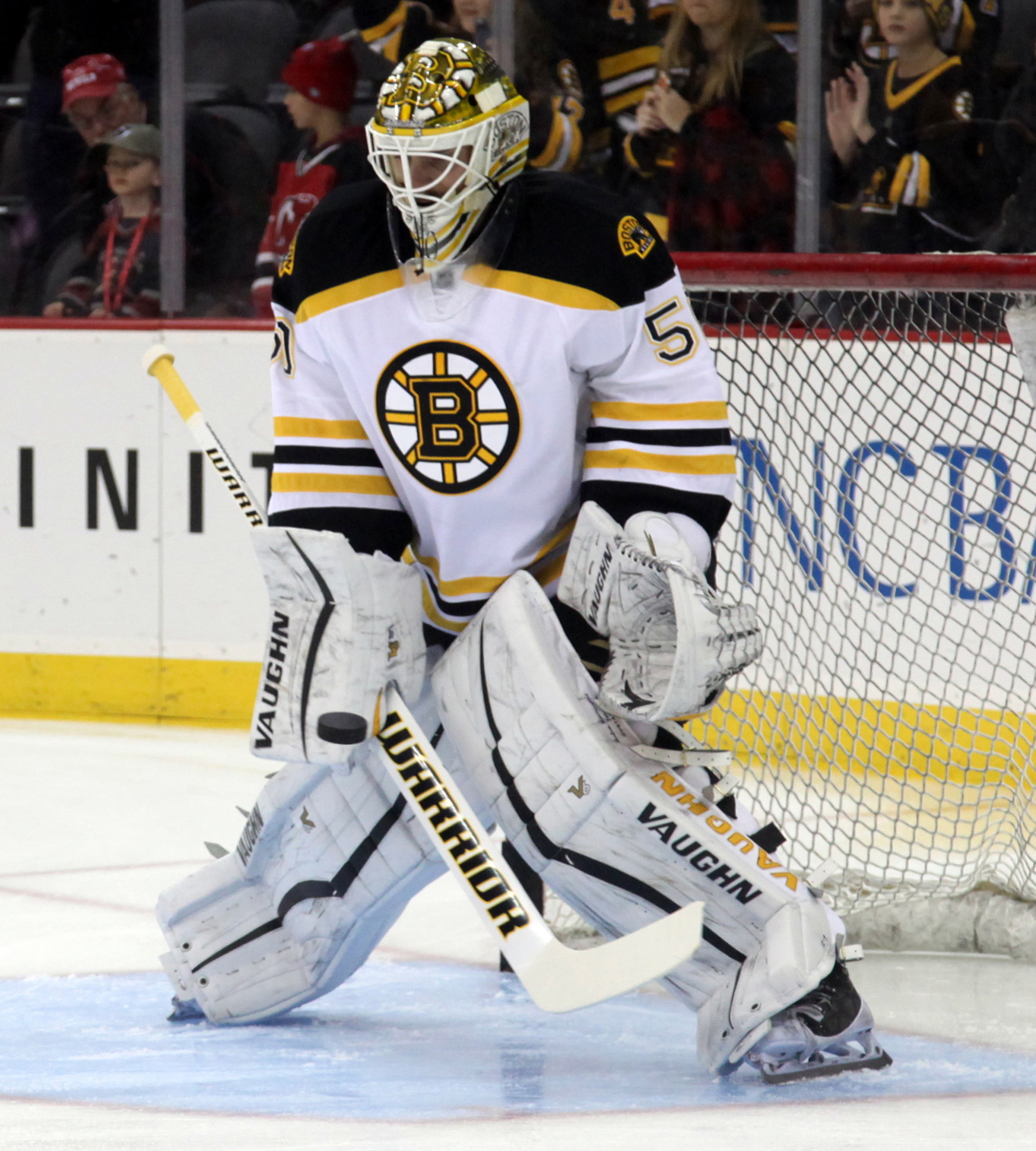
- Gustavsson with the Boston Bruins in 2016
- Born: 24 October 1984 (age 42) Danderyd, Sweden
- Height: 6 ft 4 in (193 cm)
- Weight: 201 lb (91 kg; 14 st 5 lb)
- Position: Goaltender
- Caught: Left
- Played for: Färjestad BK; Toronto Maple Leafs; Detroit Red Wings; Boston Bruins; Edmonton Oilers; Linköping HC
- National team: Sweden
- NHL draft: Undrafted
- Playing career: 2004–2020

Jonas Gustavsson (Swedish pronunciation: [ˈjûːnas ˈɡɵ̂sːtavˌsɔn]; born 24 October 1984), also known by his nickname the Monster, is a Swedish former professional ice hockey goaltender. Gustavsson played for the Toronto Maple Leafs, Detroit Red Wings, Boston Bruins and Edmonton Oilers during his National Hockey League (NHL) career.

== Playing career ==
Gustavsson started his professional career with AIK in 2002 and played with them until 2007. He then moved to Färjestad BK in the Elitserien. He was the top goalie in 2008–09, when he posted a 1.96 goals against average (GAA) and a save percentage of .932 in the regular season. In the playoffs, he bettered his statistics, posting a 1.03 GAA, a save percentage of .961 and five shutouts in 13 games. Having allowed just 14 goals in 13 playoff games, he led Färjestads BK to the league title, also being named the MVP of the playoffs in the process.

=== Toronto Maple Leafs ===
On 7 July 2009, Gustavsson ended weeks of speculation by signing a one-year contract for US $810,000 (plus a $90,000 signing bonus) with the Toronto Maple Leafs.

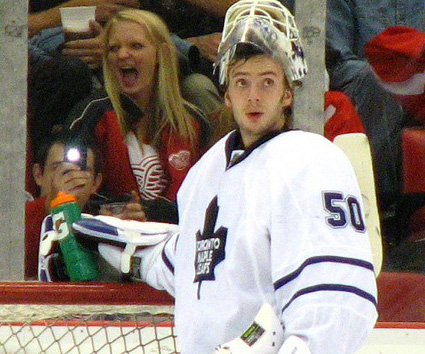
Gustavsson with the Leafs in 2009

In an interview with the Toronto Sun, Gustavsson said, "I'm going to try to steal as many games from Vesa Toskala as I can, I'm a goalie and I want to play... I know the best goalie gets the ice time and if I play good I'm going to get the chance. We will be good teammates and try to push ourselves, but my goal is to be the number one goalie... For the most part, I like [the attention]. It doesn't matter what people say about me, I know if I play good or if I play bad... I like when lots of people are getting involved. In Toronto, everybody talks about hockey. I like to be in the heat."

Gustavsson endured a setback on the first day of camp, traced to a heart condition that required an ablation surgery process. Despite the setback, Gustavsson made his NHL debut to open the 2009–10 season with Toronto on 3 October 2009, against the Washington Capitals. On 26 October, Gustavsson recorded his first NHL win against the Anaheim Ducks, making 25 saves on 28 shots in a 6–3 win.

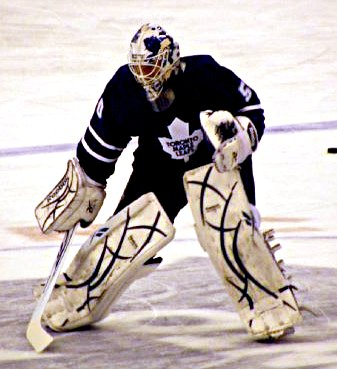
Gustavsson in the pre-game skate

After overcoming a groin strain, on 1 December, Gustavsson left after the first period in a game against the Montreal Canadiens with a heart murmur, which led to a second Radio Frequency ablation to treat a reentrant tachycardia. After he was cleared to return, he responded by recording his first NHL shutout in a 2–0 win over the Boston Bruins on 19 December. He won seven straight starts in March to tie the Maple Leafs’ club record for the longest winning streak by a rookie goaltender. Gustavsson finished the season with a 16–15–9 record with a 2.87 GAA and a .902 save percentage.

On 6 April 2010, the Toronto chapter of the Professional Hockey Writers Association announced Gustavsson as the Maple Leafs nominee for the 2010 Bill Masterton Trophy, awarded for "perseverance, sportsmanship and dedication to hockey."

After becoming a restricted free agent in the summer, Gustavsson agreed a two-year extension with the Leafs on 15 April 2010, with an average salary of $1.35 million per year.

In the following 2010–11 season, on 4 February 2011, he was sent down to the Toronto Marlies, the American Hockey League (AHL) affiliate farm team of the Maple Leafs, for a two-week conditioning stint. On 9 February, Gustavsson was pulled after the first period in a Marlies home game against the Connecticut Whale due to an accelerated heart beat. Two days later, on 11 February, Gustavsson underwent a third minor heart ablation surgery and was placed on injured reserve by the Maple Leafs, suspending his conditioning stint. Upon recovering from the surgery, Gustavsson resumed his conditioning stint with the Marlies on 22 February.

=== Detroit Red Wings ===
On 23 June 2012, with Gustavsson soon to be eligible for free agency, the goaltender's rights were traded by the Maple Leafs to the Winnipeg Jets for a conditional seventh round pick in the 2013 NHL entry draft. On 1 July 2012, however, after the Jets failed to sign Gustavsson, he signed a two-year, $3 million contract with the Detroit Red Wings instead. His first victory came in a shootout victory over the San Jose Sharks on 28 February 2013. He missed time due to injuries, however, ultimately appearing in seven games during the shortened 2013 NHL season.

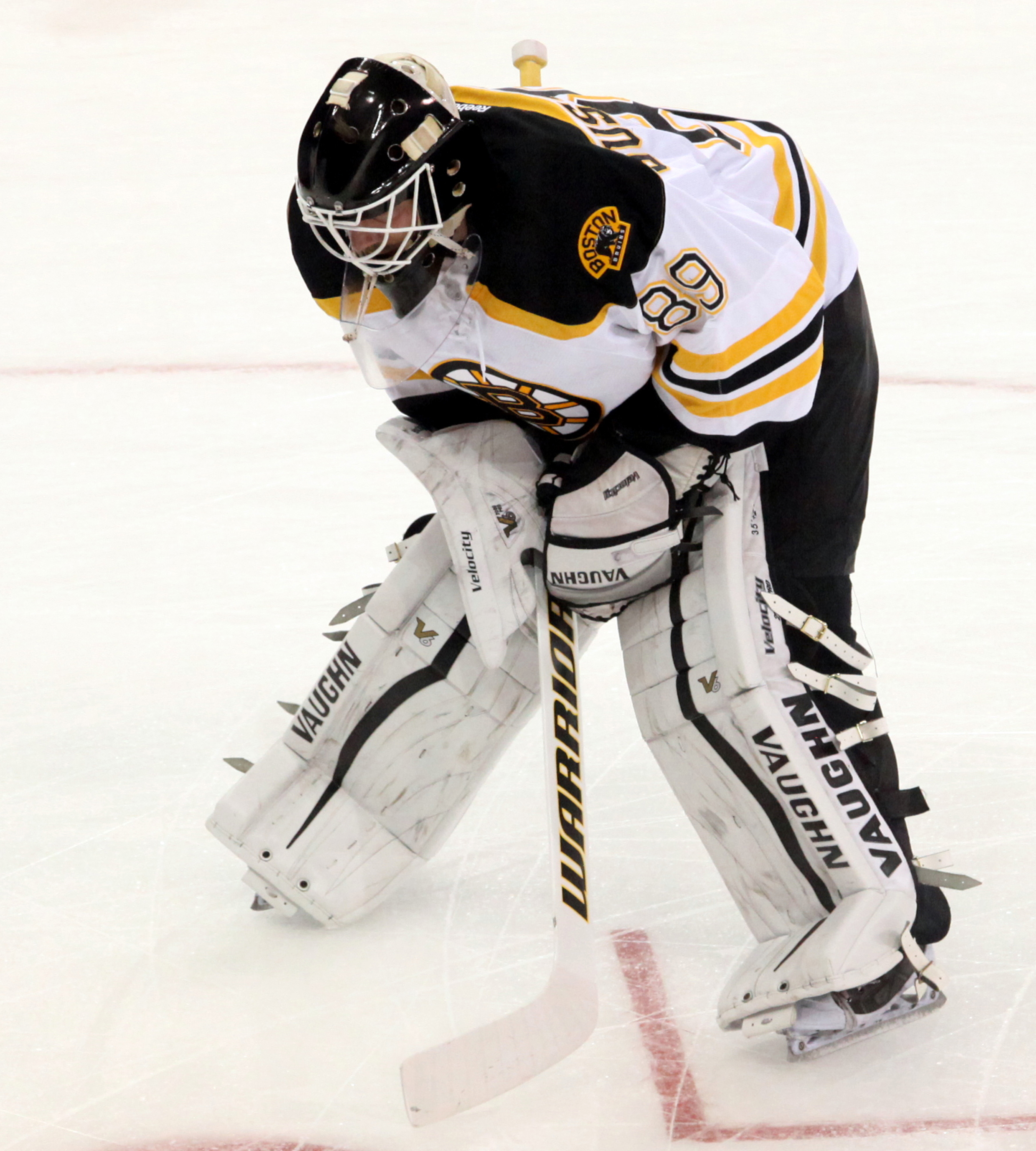
Gustavsson in September 2015

Early in the 2013–14 season, Gustavsson was called upon to replace starter Jimmy Howard, who injured his left catching hand. On 21 October 2013, Gustavsson was named NHL's First Star of the Week. Gustavsson posted a 3–0–0 record with a 1.67 goals-against average and .953 save percentage in victories over the Boston Bruins, Columbus Blue Jackets and the Colorado Avalanche, helping the Red Wings move into first place in the Atlantic Division.

On 27 June 2014, the Red Wings signed Gustavsson to a one-year, $1.85 million contract extension. He came off his best season in the NHL, with a 16–5–4 record, 2.63 goals-against average and a .907 save percentage.

On 5 November 2014, Gustavsson suffered a dislocated shoulder during the final seconds of an overtime loss to the New York Rangers. On 31 January 2015, the Red Wings assigned Gustavsson to the Grand Rapids Griffins for a conditioning assignment. During his conditioning stint, Gustavsson started two games for the Griffins, making 29 saves on 31 shots in a 4–0 loss to the Milwaukee Admirals on 31 January, and stopping 30-of-31 shots during a 3–1 win against the Toronto Marlies on 4 February.

=== Boston Bruins ===
On 4 September 2015, Gustavsson was invited to training camp by the Boston Bruins on a Professional Try Out. On 4 October 2015, the Bruins signed Gustavsson to a one-year, one-way contract. On 26 January 2016, Gustavsson was hospitalized with an elevated heart rate following the first period of a game against the Anaheim Ducks. He was released the next day, after he was found to have no heart problems.

=== Edmonton Oilers ===
On 1 July 2016, having concluded his contract with the Bruins, Gustavsson signed as a free agent to a one-year deal with the Edmonton Oilers to provide backup to starting goaltender Cam Talbot. On 24 March 2017, while playing for the Bakersfield Condors, the AHL affiliate of the Oilers, Gustavsson was credited with scoring a short-handed goal against the San Diego Gulls, as he was the last Condors player to touch the puck before an errant pass by the Gulls caused the puck to go into their own net, as they had pulled their goaltender.

=== Return to Sweden ===
After closing out the 2016–17 season, with the Condors in the AHL and having not been recalled to the Oilers post-season roster, Gustavsson as a pending free agent agreed to return to the SHL, in signing a three-year deal to be the starting goaltender for Linköping HC on 4 May 2017.

== International play ==
Medal record

Representing Sweden

Ice hockey

Winter Olympics
| Silver medal – second place | 2014 Sochi | |

World Championships
| Bronze medal – third place | 2009 Switzerland | |
| Bronze medal – third place | 2010 Germany | |

Gustavsson represented Sweden at the 2009 IIHF World Championship, winning the bronze medal. The next year, Gustavsson was named to Sweden's Olympic squad for the 2010 Winter Olympics in Vancouver, along with goaltenders Henrik Lundqvist and Stefan Liv. He played his first Olympic game against Belarus on 19 February, which resulted in a 4–2 victory. Later that year, he was also named to the Swedish team for the 2010 IIHF World Championship in Germany. As the main goaltender throughout the tournament, on 23 May, he helped secure Sweden's second consecutive bronze medal victory against hosts Germany 3–1.

== Personal life ==
Gustavsson lost his mother to chronic lung disease just before signing with the Toronto Maple Leafs, after his father died four years earlier. He resides outside of Detroit, Michigan, with his wife, Emelie Witt, to whom he was married on 19 March 2013, by United States District Judge Stephen J. Murphy.

== Career statistics ==
=== Regular season ===
| | | | Regular season | | | | | | | | | Playoffs |
| Season | Team | League | GP | W | L | T/OT | MIN | GA | SO | GAA | SV% | GP | W | L | MIN | GA | SO | GAA | SV% |
|---|---|---|---|---|---|---|---|---|---|---|---|---|---|---|---|---|---|---|---|
| 2002–03 | AIK | J20 | 21 | — | — | — | 1,261 | 69 | 0 | 3.28 | .873 | 4 | — | — | 198 | 9 | 0 | 2.72 | — |
| 2003–04 | AIK | J20 | 9 | — | — | — | 505 | 24 | 0 | 2.85 | .894 | — | — | — | — | — | — | — | — |
| 2003–04 | AIK | Allsv | 1 | — | — | — | 20 | 1 | 0 | 2.95 | .889 | — | — | — | — | — | — | — | — |
| 2004–05 | AIK | J20 | 10 | — | — | — | 557 | 32 | 0 | 3.45 | .903 | — | — | — | — | — | — | — | — |
| 2004–05 | Solna | Div.1 | 22 | — | — | — | 1,270 | 32 | 4 | 1.50 | .928 | — | — | — | — | — | — | — | — |
| 2005–06 | AIK | J20 | 5 | — | — | — | 258 | 14 | 0 | 3.26 | .906 | — | — | — | — | — | — | — | — |
| 2005–06 | AIK | Allsv | 6 | — | — | — | 351 | 14 | 0 | 2.39 | .930 | — | — | — | — | — | — | — | — |
| 2006–07 | AIK | Allsv | 23 | — | — | — | 1,269 | 59 | 2 | 2.79 | .908 | — | — | — | — | — | — | — | — |
| 2007–08 | Skåre BK | Div.1 | 6 | — | — | — | 368 | 16 | 0 | 2.61 | .919 | — | — | — | — | — | — | — | — |
| 2007–08 | Färjestad BK | SEL | 20 | — | — | — | 1,102 | 44 | 2 | 2.40 | .919 | 10 | — | — | 517 | 31 | 0 | 3.60 | .891 |
| 2008–09 | Färjestad BK | SEL | 42 | — | — | — | 2,475 | 81 | 3 | 1.96 | .932 | 13 | — | — | 819 | 14 | 5 | 1.03 | .961 |
| 2009–10 | Toronto Maple Leafs | NHL | 42 | 16 | 15 | 9 | 2,340 | 112 | 1 | 2.87 | .902 | — | — | — | — | — | — | — | — |
| 2010–11 | Toronto Maple Leafs | NHL | 23 | 6 | 13 | 2 | 1,242 | 68 | 0 | 3.29 | .890 | — | — | — | — | — | — | — | — |
| 2010–11 | Toronto Marlies | AHL | 5 | 3 | 1 | 1 | 263 | 5 | 0 | 1.14 | .950 | — | — | — | — | — | — | — | — |
| 2011–12 | Toronto Maple Leafs | NHL | 42 | 17 | 17 | 4 | 2,301 | 112 | 4 | 2.92 | .902 | — | — | — | — | — | — | — | — |
| 2012–13 | Detroit Red Wings | NHL | 7 | 2 | 2 | 1 | 349 | 17 | 0 | 2.92 | .879 | — | — | — | — | — | — | — | — |
| 2012–13 | Grand Rapids Griffins | AHL | 1 | 1 | 0 | 0 | 60 | 1 | 0 | 1.00 | .963 | — | — | — | — | — | — | — | — |
| 2013–14 | Detroit Red Wings | NHL | 27 | 16 | 5 | 4 | 1,551 | 68 | 0 | 2.62 | .907 | 2 | 0 | 2 | 133 | 6 | 0 | 2.71 | .917 |
| 2014–15 | Grand Rapids Griffins | AHL | 2 | 1 | 1 | 0 | 119 | 4 | 0 | 2.02 | .937 | 2 | 0 | — | — | — | — | — | — |
| 2014–15 | Detroit Red Wings | NHL | 7 | 3 | 3 | 1 | 351 | 15 | 1 | 2.56 | .911 | — | — | — | — | — | — | — | — |
| 2015–16 | Boston Bruins | NHL | 24 | 11 | 9 | 1 | 1259 | 57 | 1 | 2.72 | .908 | — | — | — | — | — | — | — | — |
| 2016–17 | Edmonton Oilers | NHL | 7 | 1 | 3 | 1 | 331 | 17 | 0 | 3.10 | .878 | — | — | — | — | — | — | — | — |
| 2016–17 | Bakersfield Condors | AHL | 20 | 8 | 9 | 1 | 1114 | 45 | 1 | 2.42 | .917 | — | — | — | — | — | — | — | — |
| 2017–18 | Linköping HC | SHL | 36 | 15 | 16 | 4 | 2047 | 80 | 3 | 2.34 | .916 | 5 | 3 | 2 | 317 | 14 | 0 | 2.65 | .919 |
| 2018–19 | Linköping HC | SHL | 36 | 18 | 14 | 2 | 2039 | 85 | 2 | 2.50 | .917 | — | — | — | — | — | — | — | — |
| NHL totals | | | 179 | 72 | 67 | 23 | 9,723 | 466 | 7 | 2.88 | .901 | 2 | 0 | 2 | 133 | 6 | 0 | 2.71 | .917 |

=== International ===
| Year | Team | Event | Result | GP | W | L | T/OTL | MIN | GA | SO | GAA | SV% |
|---|---|---|---|---|---|---|---|---|---|---|---|---|
| 2009 | Sweden | WC | 3rd place, bronze medalist(s) | 5 | 3 | 2 | 0 | 276 | 13 | 0 | 2.83 | .904 |
| 2010 | Sweden | Oly | 5th | 1 | 1 | 0 | 0 | 60 | 2 | 0 | 2.00 | .895 |
| 2010 | Sweden | WC | 3rd place, bronze medalist(s) | 6 | 4 | 2 | 0 | 369 | 11 | 0 | 1.79 | .937 |
| Senior totals | | | | 12 | 8 | 4 | 0 | 705 | 26 | 0 | 2.21 | .912 |

== Awards and achievements ==
- Won a bronze medal at the 2009 IIHF World Championship and 2010 IIHF World Championship
- Top 3 player at 2009 IIHF World Championship
- Won the Swedish championship in 2009
- Best save percentage in the 2008–09 Elitserien season
- Best goals against average in the 2008–09 Elitserien season
- Named to Elitserien All-Star Team in 2009
- Won the Elitserien Guldpucken award in 2009
- Won a silver medal at the 2014 Winter Olympics

== Appearances ==
Gustavsson was referenced in the eighth episode of the seventh season in Psych titled "Right Turn or Left for Dead." Shawn tells a Swedish bartender that Gus's name is "Jonas Gustavsson." The bartender replied "From the Toronto Maple Leafs?"

Awards and achievements
| Preceded by Stefan Liv | Guldpucken; 2009 | Succeeded by Magnus Johansson |
