= Morgenblatt für gebildete Stände =

German literary journal, 1807 to 1865

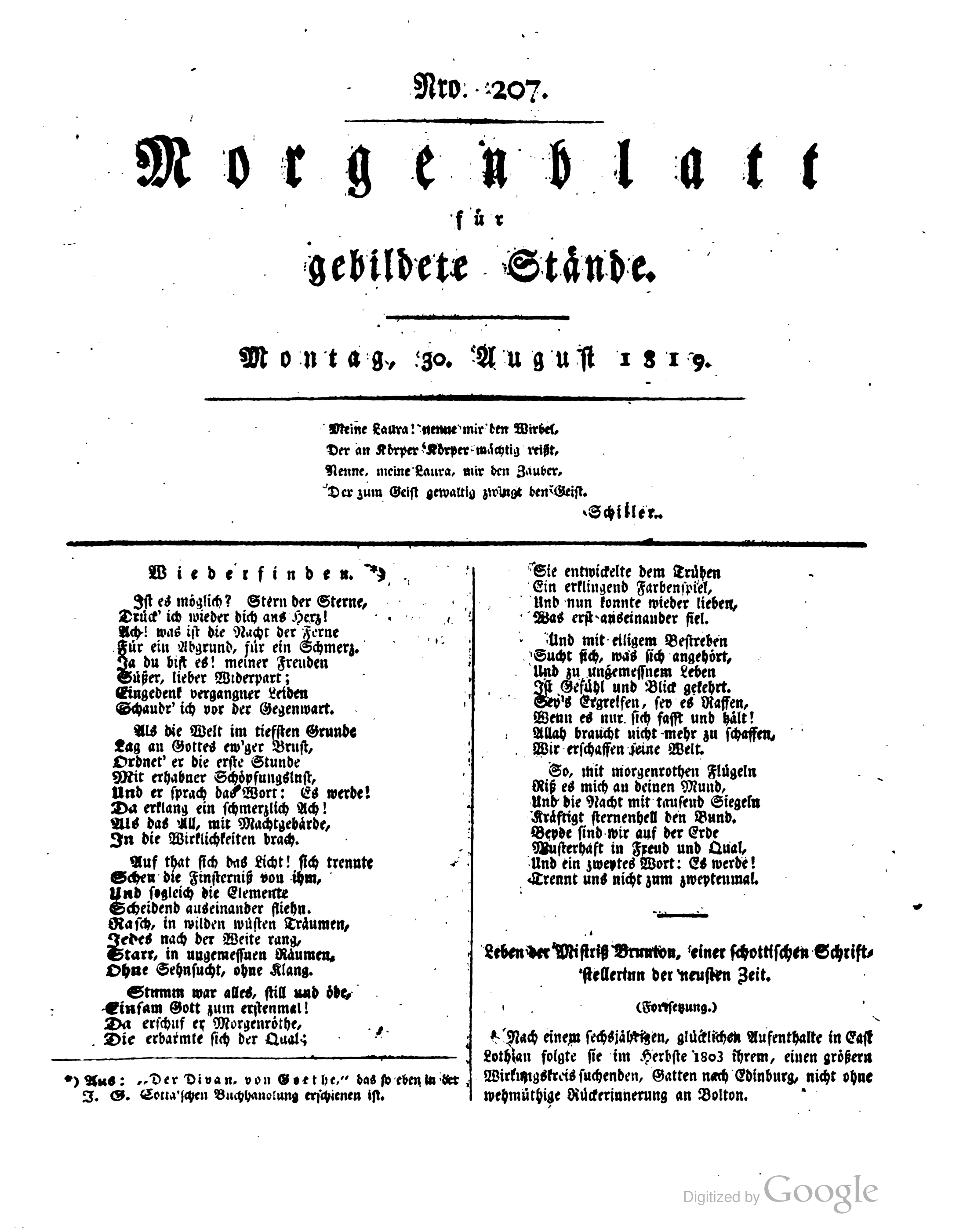
Morgenblatt, 30 August 1819, with an excerpt of Goethe's West–östlicher Divan

The Morgenblatt für gebildete Stände ("Morning paper for the educated classes", renamed to Morgenblatt für gebildete Leser, "Morning paper for educated readers" in 1837) was a German cultural and literary journal that existed from 1807 to 1865. It appeared daily (Monday to Saturday) until 1851, when it was changed to a weekly journal. The Morgenblatt was published by Cotta in Tübingen and later in Stuttgart, and was the most important German literary and cultural journal of its time.

== Conception and history ==
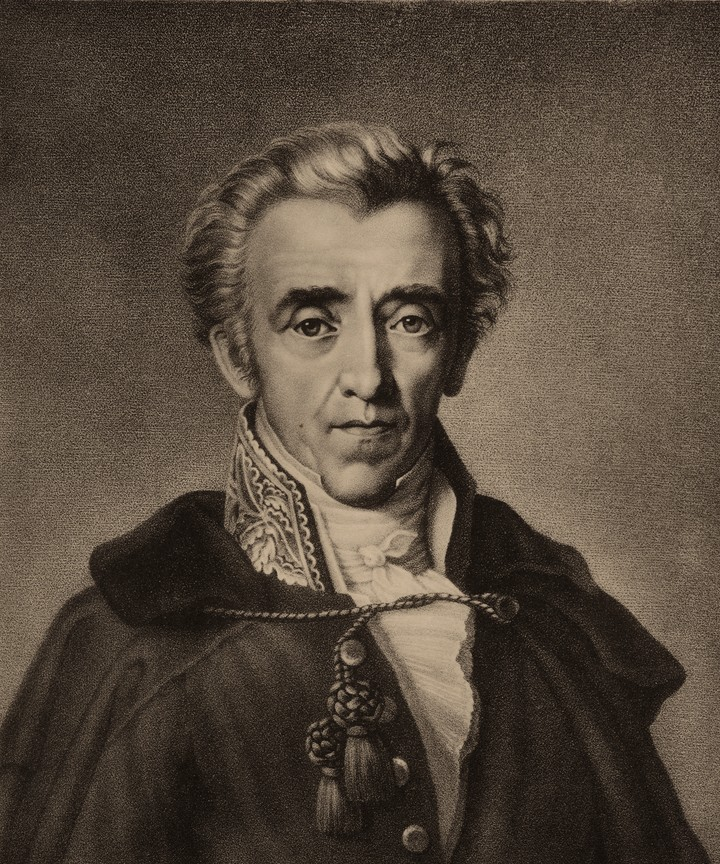
Johann Friedrich Cotta, 1824

The Morgenblatt was founded by Johann Friedrich Cotta, who had in 1806 envisioned creating a South German equivalent of Der Freimüthige, a journal edited in Berlin by August von Kotzebue, but Cotta's letters to Goethe show that the idea of having a regional focus was soon dropped. The decision to use the name Morgenblatt (morning paper) was decided in November 1806.

The topic of the Morgenblatt was supposed to be everything that could interest an educated reader, with the exception of politics, complementing Cotta's Allgemeine Zeitung. The journal was not tied to any literary trends or programmes, but tried to cover the entire breadth of literary production. It covered a wide range of cultural topics including travelogues and literary criticism. The intended audience was an educated, but not scholarly, cultural elite, explicitly including women. Cotta discontinued several journals specialised on foreign literature (the Englische Miscellen, Französische Miscellen and Italienische Miscellen) and merged them into the Morgenblatt.

The journal first appeared on 1 January 1807, shortly after being announced in the Allgemeine Zeitung, in an edition of 1100 copies costing 8 Saxon thalers per year. It was quite successful both with critics and with the general public. The circulation increased to 1810 copies by 1819, but the journal had many more readers via subscription libraries or other reading clubs, and its total readership has been estimated around 15,000. The journal appeared daily (Monday to Friday) until 1851, then weekly until 1865.

Most famous authors of the era wrote or were featured in the Morgenblatt, starting with Jean Paul, who opened the first issue with a eulogy referencing the possible future end of the journal. Others included Heinrich von Kleist, Johann Gottfried Seume, Eduard Mörike, Theodor Fontane and Conrad Ferdinand Meyer. To discover more authors, the journal also used competitions, starting with one in 1807 where Goethe was a judge.

The journal was published in Tübingen until 1820, in Stuttgart and Tübingen until 1855, when it was published in Stuttgart and Augsburg for a short time, and then in Stuttgart and Munich until the end. The name was changed to Morgenblatt für gebildete Leser in 1837.

When the long-term editor Hermann Hauff died in 1865, the journal was discontinued at the end of the year, with readers preferring other products like Die Gartenlaube.

== Editors ==
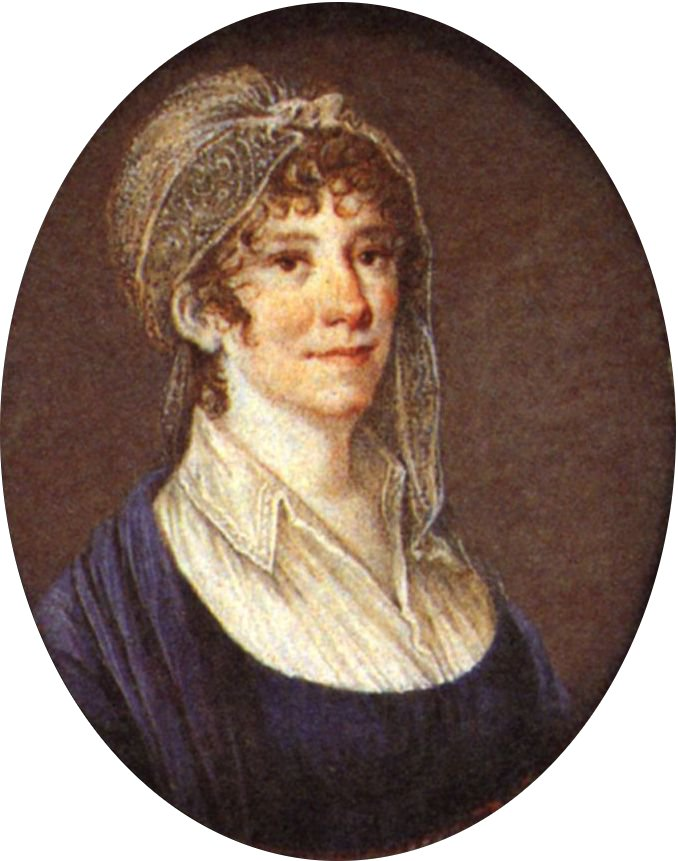
Therese Huber

The first editor was Karl Grüneisen, who led the journal 1807–1808, followed by Georg Reinbeck from 1808 to 1811. Both quit after disagreements with Cotta. The main editors were then Friedrich Haug and Friedrich Christoph Weisser. After criticism by Karl Böttiger, Cotta replaced Weisser by Friedrich Rückert, who was an editor 1815–1817.

Recommended by Böttiger, Therese Huber became an editor in 1816, after publishing various contributions, many of them anonymously, as was very common in the Morgenblatt. Huber was the first woman supporting her family with a salaried editorial position at a journal and has been described as the first woman to hold an editorial position and even as the first journalist in Germany. Huber had full responsibility for the journal from 1817, when Rückert and Haug quit, to 1823. She was not only author and editor for the journal, but also contributed many of her own translations. The journal had its most successful period under her editorship, with more than 1800 copies sold in 1820, and somewhat declined after she left, but this decline has also been attributed to problems with censorship related to the Carlsbad Decrees.

In 1823, Cotta installed his son Georg Cotta as assistant editor and announced the move of the Morgenblatt editorial office to Augsburg, and Huber moved there. However, Cotta eventually decided to leave the offices in Stuttgart (possibly for reasons of censorship) and Huber's editorial duties came to an end. The editorship was then taken over by Cotta himself and his son, but this was not publicly announced. The brothers Wilhelm Hauff and, after his early death, Hermann Hauff became the editors from 1 January 1827.

Adolf Müllner edited the Literatur-Blatt, the literary supplement from 1820 to 1825. According to some reports, he used it extensively for self-promotion of his dramas. From 1825, it was edited by Wolfgang Menzel who used his influence to advance national liberalism and to attack more liberal intellectuals.

== Selected contents and contributors ==
Goethe, whose works were published by Cotta, was regularly featured and also contributed some content, for example an essay about a new edition of his works.

Heinrich Heine's reports of his journeys in Italy first appeared in the Morgenblatt in 1828–29.

Friedrich Engels contributed as the correspondent for Bremen in 1840–1841.

In 1842, the novella Die Judenbuche by Annette von Droste-Hülshoff was first published in instalments in the Morgenblatt, with the title chosen by the editor Hermann Hauff.

In 1860, parts of what was to become Theodor Fontane's Wanderungen durch die Mark Brandenburg were published in the Morgenblatt.

Some of the journal's female authors include Fanny Lewald, Helmina von Chézy, who had been editor of the Französische Miszellen, Louise von Gall, and Fanny Tarnow, who often wrote anonymously or under pseudonyms. Ottilie Assing wrote for the journal both before and after her emigration to the United States, and her interpretation in more than 130 reports was highly influential on the views of the German intellectual public on the problem of slavery in 1860s America. With the list of authors also including Caroline Pichler, Annette von Droste-Hülshoff, Friederike Brun and others, almost all notable female writers of the time were featured in the journal.

== Bibliography ==
- Fischer, Bernhard (1995). Estermann, Monika (ed.). "Cottas "Morgenblatt für gebildete Stände" in der Zeit von 1807 bis 1823 und die Mitarbeit Therese Hubers". Archiv für Geschichte des Buchwesens. 43: 203–239. ISBN 9783110963694.
- Fischer, Bernhard (2000). Morgenblatt für gebildete Stände / gebildete Leser (1807-1865) : Register der Honorarempfänger / Autoren und Kollationsprotokolle. Berlin: De Gruyter. ISBN 978-3-11-186229-3. OCLC 853246534.
- Fischer, Bernhard (3 March 2014). Johann Friedrich Cotta: Verleger - Entrepreneur - Politiker (in German). Wallstein Verlag. ISBN 978-3-8353-2569-2.
- Heuser, Magdalene (1 August 2013). "Lektüre – Übersetzung – Vermittlung. Therese Hubers Redaktionstätigkeit für Cottas Morgenblatt für gebildete Stände". Oxford German Studies. 42 (2): 158–172. doi:10.1179/0078719113Z.00000000032. ISSN 0078-7191. S2CID 161852112.
- Peek, Sabine (1965). "Cottas Morgenblatt für gebildete Stände: seine Entwicklung und Bedeutung unter der Redaktion der Brüder Hauff (1827-1865)". Börsenblatt für den Deutschen Buchhandel. 65. Frankfurt (am Main): Buchhändler-Vereinigung: 947–1063. doi:10.11588/diglit.53628.
- Suarez, F. J. F.; Woudhuysen, H. R. (24 October 2013). The Book: A Global History. OUP Oxford. p. 567. ISBN 978-0-19-166875-3.
- Unseld, Siegfried (12 April 2019). Goethe and His Publishers. University of Chicago Press. ISBN 978-0-226-07546-4.
