= Das geistliche Jahr =

Das geistliche Jahr (or the Spiritual Year) is a religious and philosophical cycle of poems that began in 1818 and were published in 1851. The poems were written by Annette von Droste-Hülshoff, an influential 19th-century German author and one of Germany's most well-known female poets.

== Poems ==
Das geistliche Jahr includes the following poems, together with their equivalents in English:

Name	English translation
Am Neujahrstage	New Year's Day
Am Fest der Heiligen Drei Könige	The Epiphany
Am ersten Sonntage nach Heilige Drei Könige	The first Sunday after Epiphany
Am Feste vom süßen Namen Jesus	The Baptism of the Lord
Am dritten Sonntage nach Heilige Drei Könige	The third Sunday after Epiphany
Am vierten Sonntage nach Heilige Drei Könige	The fourth Sunday after Epiphany
Am Feste Mariä Lichtmeß	Candlemas
Am fünften Sonntage nach Heilige Drei Könige	The fifth Sunday after Epiphany
Fastnacht	Shrove Tuesday
Am Aschermittwochen	Ash Wednesday
Am ersten Sonntag in der Fasten	The first Sunday in Lent
Am zweiten Sonntag in der Fasten	The second Sunday in Lent
Am dritten Sonntag in der Fasten	The third Sunday in Lent
Am vierten Sonntag in der Fasten	The fourth Sunday in Lent
Am fünften Sonntag in der Fasten	The fifth Sunday in Lent
Am Feste Mariä Verkündigung	The feast of the Annunciation
Am Palmsonntage	Palm Sunday
Am Montag in der Charwoche	Monday in Holy Week
Am Dienstag in der Charwoche	Tuesday in Holy Week
Am Mittwochen in der Charwoche	Wednesday in Holy Week
Am Gründonnerstage	Holy Thursday
Am Charfreitage	Good Friday
Am Charsamstage	Saturday in Holy Week
Am Ostersonntage	Easter Sunday
Am Ostermontage	Easter Monday
Am ersten Sonntage nach Ostern	The first Sunday after Easter
Am zweiten Sonntage nach Ostern	The second Sunday after Easter
Am dritten Sonntage nach Ostern	The third Sunday after Easter
Am vierten Sonntage nach Ostern	The fourth Sunday after Easter
Am fünften Sonntage nach Ostern	The fifth Sunday after Easter
Christi Himmelfahrt	The feast of the Ascension
Am sechsten Sonntage nach Ostern	The sixth Sunday after Easter
Pfingstsonntag	Pentecost
Pfingstmontag	Whit-Monday
Am ersten Sonntage nach Pfingsten [Dreifaltigkeit]	Trinity Sunday
Am Fronleichnamstagev	Corpus Christi
Am zweiten Sonntage nach Pfingsten	The second Sunday after Pentecost
Am dritten Sonntage nach Pfingsten	The third Sunday after Pentecost
Am vierten Sonntage nach Pfingsten	The fourth Sunday after Pentecost
Am fünften Sonntage nach Pfingsten	The fifth Sunday after Pentecost
Am sechsten Sonntage nach Pfingsten	The sixth Sunday after Pentecost
Am siebten Sonntage nach Pfingsten	The seventh Sunday after Pentecost
Am achten Sonntage nach Pfingsten	The eighth Sunday after Pentecost
Am neunten Sonntage nach Pfingsten	The ninth Sunday after Pentecost
Am zehnten Sonntage nach Pfingsten	The tenth Sunday after Pentecost
Am elften Sonntage nach Pfingsten	The eleventh Sunday after Pentecost
Am zwölften Sonntage nach Pfingsten	The twelfth Sunday after Pentecost
Am dreizehnten Sonntage nach Pfingsten	The thirteenth Sunday after Pentecost
Am vierzehnten Sonntage nach Pfingsten	The fourteenth Sunday after Pentecost
Am fünfzehnten Sonntage nach Pfingsten	The fifteenth Sunday after Pentecost
Am sechzehnten Sonntage nach Pfingsten	The sixteenth Sunday after Pentecost
Am siebzehnten Sonntage nach Pfingsten	The seventeenth Sunday after Pentecost
Am achtzehnten Sonntage nach Pfingsten	The eighteenth Sunday after Pentecost
Am neunzehnten Sonntage nach Pfingsten	The nineteenth Sunday after Pentecost
Am zwanzigsten Sonntage nach Pfingsten	The twentieth Sunday after Pentecost
Am einundzwanzigsten Sonntage nach Pfingstenv	The twenty-first Sunday after Pentecost
Am zweiundzwanzigsten Sonntage nach Pfingsten	The twenty-second Sunday after Pentecost
Am dreiundzwanzigsten Sonntage nach Pfingsten	The twenty-third Sunday after Pentecost
Am Allerheiligentage	All Saints' Day
Am Allerseelentage	All Souls' Day
Am vierundzwanzigsten Sonntage nach Pfingsten	The twenty-fourth Sunday after Pentecost
Am fünfundzwanzigsten Sonntage nach Pfingsten	The twenty-fifth Sunday after Pentecost
Am sechsundzwanzigsten Sonntage nach Pfingsten	The twenty-sixth Sunday after Pentecost
Am siebenundzwanzigsten Sonntage nach Pfingsten	The twenty-seventh Sunday after Pentecost
Am ersten Sonntage im Advent	The first Sunday in Advent
Am zweiten Sonntage im Advent	The second Sunday in Advent
Am dritten Sonntage im Advent	The third Sunday in Advent
Am vierten Sonntage im Advent	The fourth Sunday in Advent
Am Weihnachtstage	The feast of the Nativity
Am zweiten Weihnachtstage [Stephanus]	Saint Stephen's Day
Am Sonntage nach Weihnachten	The Sunday after Christmas
Am letzten Tage des Jahres	New Year's Eve

== See also ==
- Annette von Droste-Hülshoff
- Die Judenbuche
