= Robert Eberle =

German painter

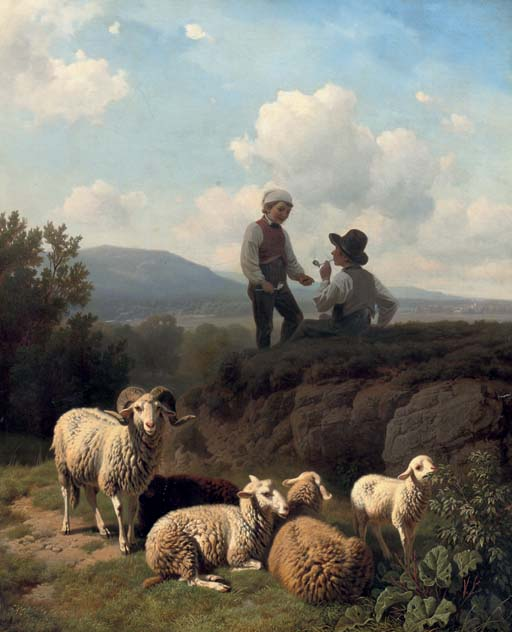
Young shepherds with their flock

Robert Eberle (22 July 1815 – 19 September 1862) was a German animal painter born at Meersburg, on Lake Constance.

== Life ==
He was first instructed by J.J. Bidermann at Constance, and afterwards went to Munich in 1830, where he studied from nature and the works of Van de Velde and Du Jardin. He spent three months in America (1848), and then settled at Eberfing, near Munich, where he died from an accidental pistol shot. He especially excelled in painting sheep, and there is a Shepherdess by him in the Modern Gallery at Munich.

== Works ==
- Shepherd with Herd Returning Home (1840)
- Grain Harvest (1848)
- Morning at Weinheim (1849)
- Leaving the Alp (1849)
- Frightened Sheep (1850)
- Cattle Returning Home (1850)
- Sheep Resting (1850)
- Return from the Fields (1851)
- Alp on Benedicten Wall (1852)
- Goats Starting for Pasture (1852)
- Sheep Resting at Noon (1852)
- Evening in Pasture (1852)
- Sheep Resting (1852)
- Shepherd Boy (1852)
- Sheep During Storm, Early Snow (1853)
- Shepherd and Sheep (1854)
- Shepherd's Dinner (1855)
- Village; in the Morning (1857)
- Peasant and Shepherd (1857)
- Sheep Driven over Precipice by an Eagle (1858)
- Village Scene (1859)
- Swabian Shepherd with Herd (1860), Neue Pinakothek, Munich
- Cows returning from Pasture (1861)

== See also ==
- List of German painters
