= Little House, Meersburg =

Historic German house

Little House
- Fürstenhäusle
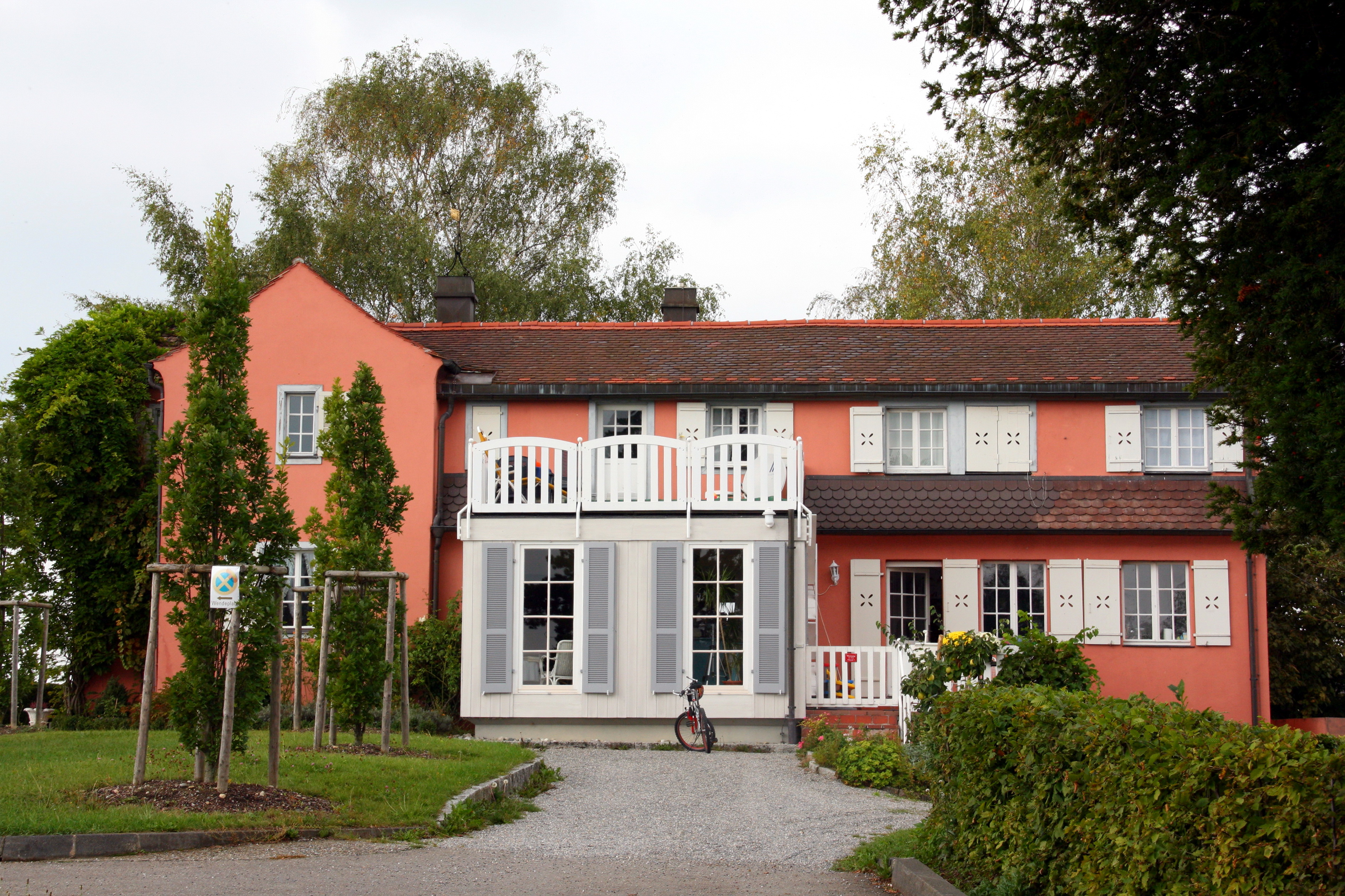
- The Little House seen from the southeast, at the end of a paved path.

Map location and basic information
Location within Germany Little House, Meersburg (Baden-Württemberg)
General information
Location	Meersburg, Germany
Coordinates	47°41′40.33″N 9°16′31.45″E
Owner	Baden-Württemberg

Website
- www.fuerstenhaeusle.de/en/home/

The Little House, also called the Prince's House (Fürstenhäusle), is a historic house and museum located in Meersburg, Germany, overlooking Lake Constance. It was the residence of the poet Annette von Droste-Hülshoff, to whom the museum is dedicated.

== History ==
The Little House was built sometime around 1600 by Jakob Fugger, a canon of the diocese of Constance and descendant of Jakob Fugger the Rich. In 1604, he became the Prince-Bishop of Constance, though he continued to reside at the Little House until his death in 1626. So did succeeding Prince-Bishops, giving the residence its name (Fürstenhäusle), until the Prince-Bishopric was secularized in 1803 and absorbed into the Electorate of Baden. After secularization, the Little House stood empty.

Over two centuries after Prince-Bishop Fugger's death, in 1797, the poet Annette von Droste-Hülshoff was born. She began to find literary success at a young age, but was weighed down with familial obligations, and frequently ill. To find solace, the poet frequently spent time in Meersburg with her sister and her husband, Joseph von Laßberg, at Meersburg Castle. From 1841 especially, Droste-Hülshoff spent most of her time in Meersburg, where, in November 1843, the Little House went to auction. Droste-Hülshoff, desiring a private residence for herself in later years, participated with little competition. Thus, the purchase came out to 400 Reichsthaler, a sum supplied by her own revenue and Laßberg's annuity. The poet was very fond of her purchase and wrote glowingly of it in letters to friends and family. However, she had never resided there by the time she died in 1848, aged 51.

Droste-Hülshoff's descendants transformed the Little House into a museum dedicated to their forebear and her works in 1923. Carl von Droste-Hülshoff also added a new wing and moved the entrance.

In 1947, Heinrich von Bothmer-Schwegerhoff, another descendant of Droste-Hülshoff, and his American wife, Helen von Bothmer, moved into the Little House. Bothmer operated the museum until her death in 1996 and endowed a literary prize for women poets, the Droste Prize, in 1957.

Staatliche Schlösser und Gärten Baden-Württemberg (SSG), the public entity that manages State properties in Baden-Württemberg, closed the Little House in late 2016 for renovations funded by proceeds from the Glücksspirale lottery. The Little House was to be reopened in September with a new exhibit dedicated to Annette von Droste-Hülshoff, a collaboration between SSG and the Droste Research Center of the Landschaftsverband Westfalen-Lippe.

== Grounds and architecture ==
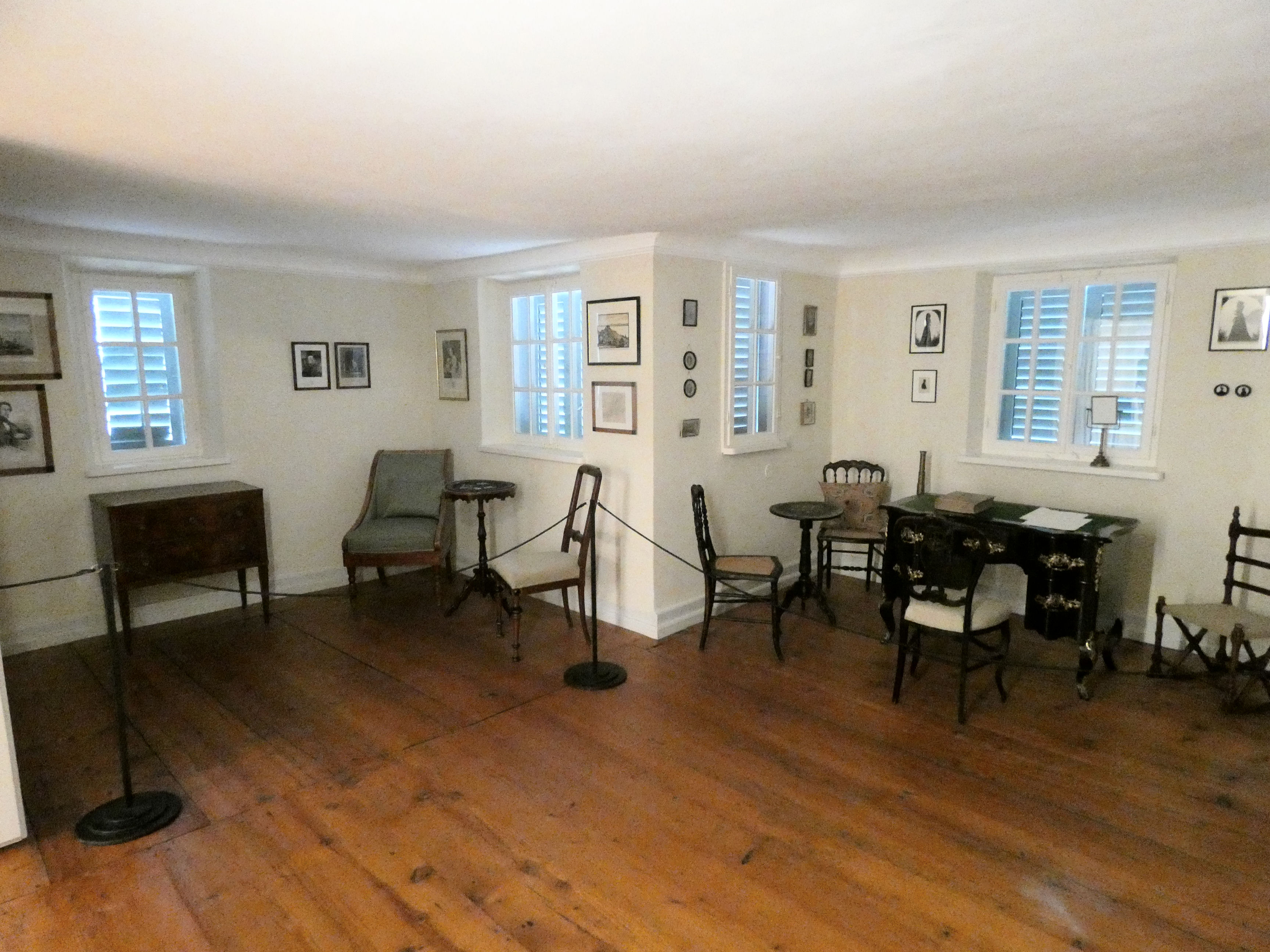
The Swallow's nest

When Annette von Droste-Hülshoff was residing at the Little House, it consisted of a state room and a kitchen on the ground floor, which housed a staircase into a common room and bedrooms for herself and a maid. Droste-Hülshoff described the state room as a "glass case" with an oriel that contained a canapé and a tile stove. Memorabilia from the poet's time are on display here. In the alcove nearby is located Droste-Hülshoff's collection of jewels. Droste-Hülshoff described the upstairs room as a "swallow's nest", decorated now with copies of Droste-Hülshoff's manuscripts, miniature portraits, and family photographs. Also on display here are first-edition copies of works by Droste-Hülshoff, Goethe, and Levin Schücking. During her ownership of the Little House, Droste-Hülshoff had it repainted.

The portion of the Little House that existed when Annette von Droste-Hülshoff purchased the house is arranged as she described it and contains an exhibit dedicated to her work.

The wing added by Carl von Droste-Hülshoff is now the visitor center.

== See also ==
- Annette von Droste-Hülshoff
- Neues Schloss (Meersburg)
- Meersburg Castle
