= Annette von Droste-Hülshoff =

German composer and writer (1797–1848)

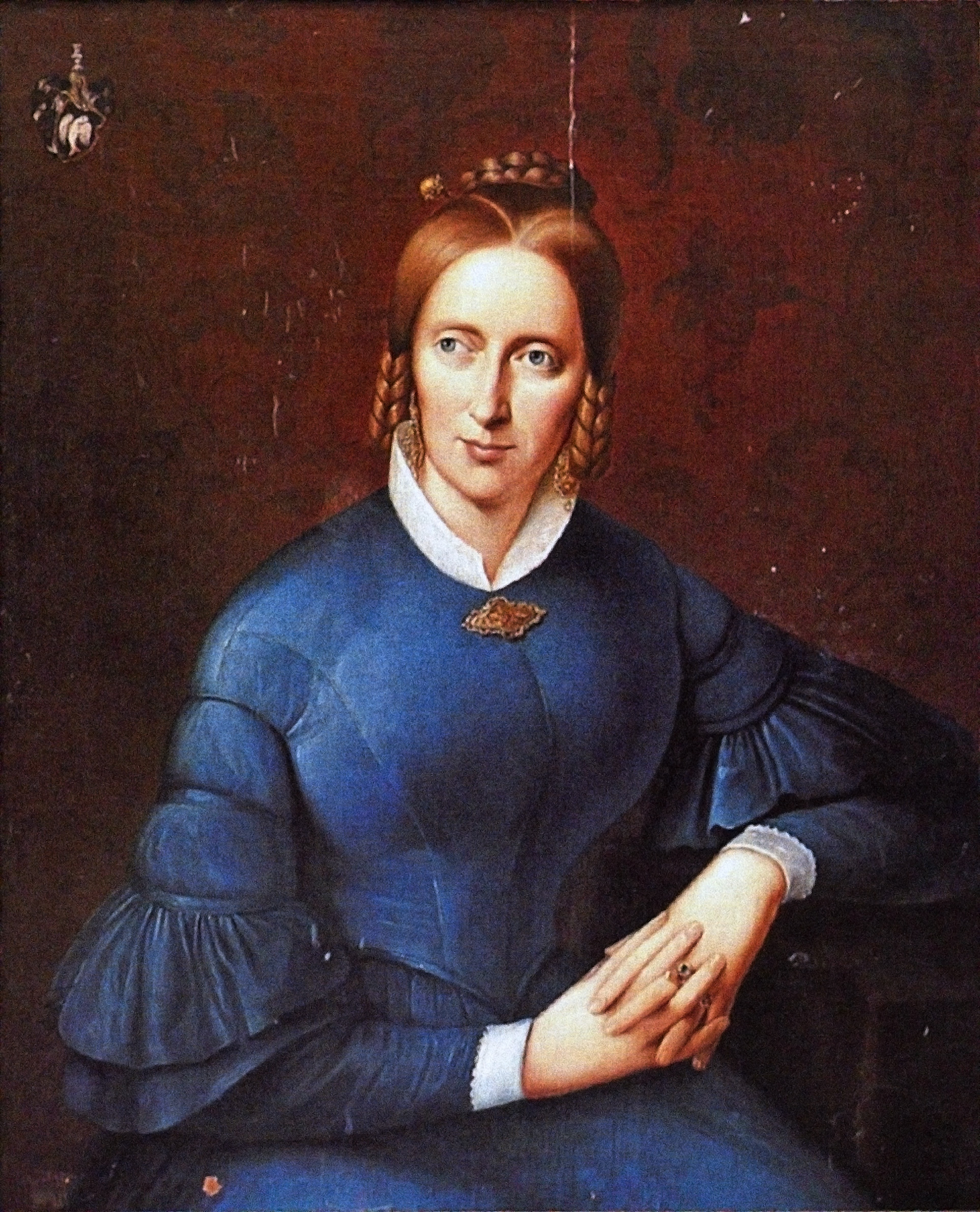
- Portrait by Johann Sprick, 1838
- Born: Anna Elisabeth Franziska Adolphine Wilhelmine Louise Maria von Droste zu Hülshoff; 10 January 1797; Havixbeck, Prince-Bishopric of Münster, Holy Roman Empire
- Died: 24 May 1848 (aged 51); Meersburg, Grand Duchy of Baden
- Occupation: Writer
- Writing career
- Period: 19th century Biedermeier
- Genres: Poetry, novella
- Notable work: Die Judenbuche

Baroness Anna Elisabeth Franziska Adolphine Wilhelmine Louise Maria von Droste zu Hülshoff, known as Annette von Droste-Hülshoff (German: [aˈnɛtə fɔn ˈdʁɔstəˈhʏlshɔf]; 10 January (Note: There is some ambiguity about Droste's birthdate. Heselhaus 1984, p. 786 gives 10 January, but says that the family celebrated her birthday on the 12th from 1806 onwards. The date in the church register is 14 January. Freund 2011, p. 152 gives the date as 12 January.) 1797 – 24 May 1848), was a 19th-century German Biedermeier poet, novelist, and composer of classical music. Her most famous work is the novella Die Judenbuche.

In an article for the 1913 Catholic Encyclopedia, Francis Joste wrote, "The fame of the poetess rests chiefly on her lyric poems, her pastorales, and her ballads. In the poetic representation of nature, few can equal her. The poetical works of Annette von Droste-Hülshoff are imperishable. What makes them so is their originality, the proof that they are the works of a genius. It is this too that gained for their author the well-earned title of 'Germany's greatest poetess.'"

== Biography ==
=== Early years ===
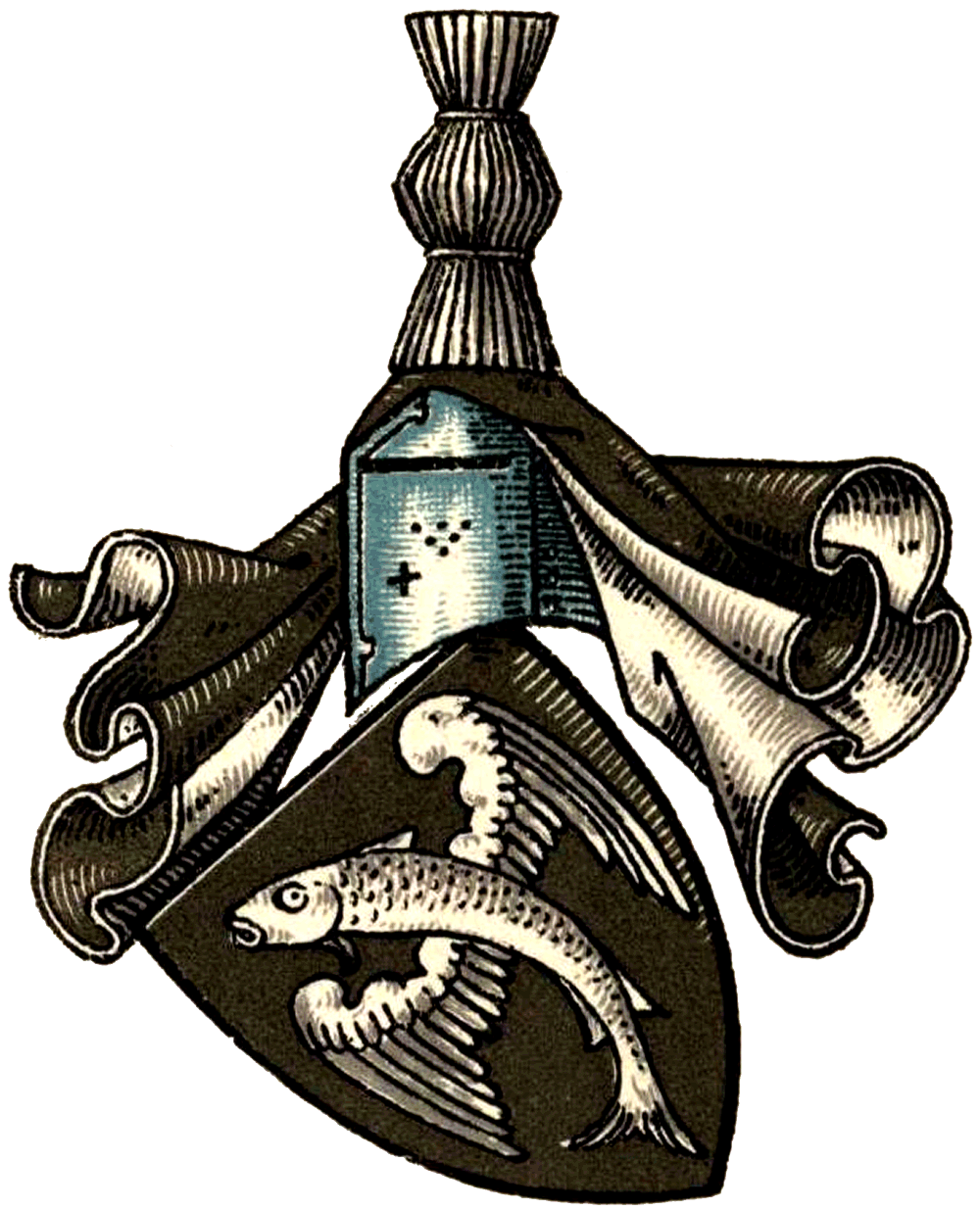
Arms of the Barons von Droste-Hülshoff

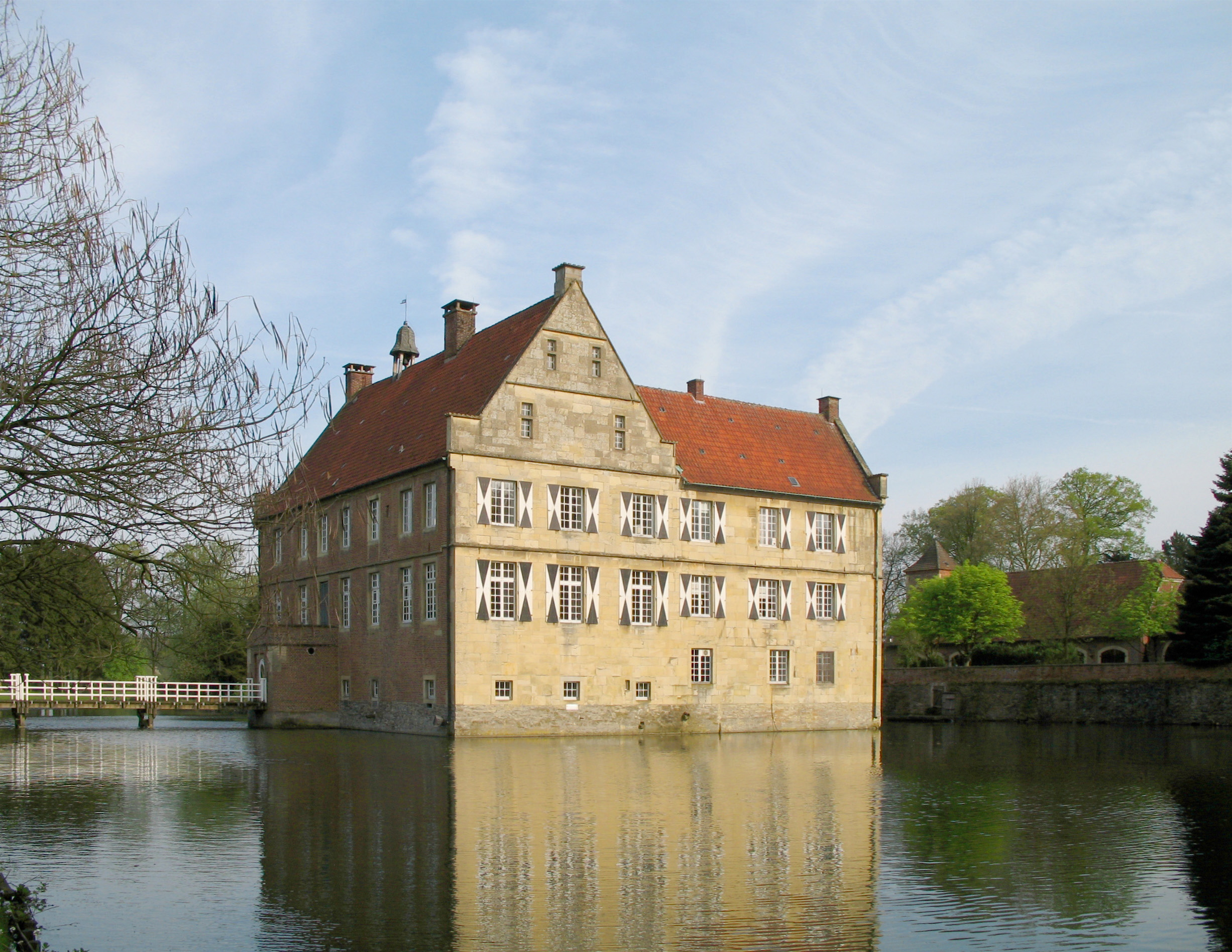
Burg Hülshoff in Havixbeck, Germany: birthplace of Annette Freiin von Droste-Hülshoff

Annette von Droste-Hülshoff was born at the castle of Burg Hülshoff (now a part of Havixbeck) in the Prince-Bishopric of Münster. Her family, the Barons Droste zu Hülshoff, belonged to the oldest Roman Catholic aristocracy of Westphalia. Her father, Clemens-August II. Freiherr von Droste zu Hülshoff (1760–1826) was a learned man who was interested in ancient history and languages, ornithology, botany, music and the supernatural. Her mother Therese Luise (1772–1853) came from another ancient aristocratic Westphalian family, the Barons von Haxthausen.

Annette was the second of four children: she had an elder sister Maria Anna (nicknamed "Jenny", 1795–1859) and two younger brothers, Werner Konstantin (1798–1867) and Ferdinand (1800–1829). Annette was born one month prematurely and only saved by the intervention of a nurse. She suffered from problems with her health throughout her life, including headaches and eye troubles.

Droste was educated by private tutors in ancient languages, French, natural history, mathematics and music (she inherited considerable musical talent from her father). She began to write as a child; 50 poems written between 1804 and 1814 have been preserved. Droste's maternal grandfather, Baron Werner Adolf von Haxthausen, had remarried after the death of Annette's grandmother in 1772 and built himself a new castle, Schloss Bökerhof, in the village of Bökendorf, Paderborn. Here his sons from his second marriage, Werner and August, had formed an intellectual circle. They were in contact with such celebrated cultural figures as the Brothers Grimm, Clemens Brentano, Friedrich Schlegel, Adele and Johanna Schopenhauer. Droste visited Schloss Bökerhof frequently and made the acquaintance of Wilhelm Grimm. She and her sister contributed folk tales from Westphalia to the Grimms' famous collection of fairy stories. However, neither Grimm nor her uncles gave any encouragement to her literary ambitions. The only literary figure to recognize her talent was Anton Matthias Sprickmann (1749–1833), whom she first met in 1812. Sprickmann was the founder of the theatre in Münster and had known important 18th-century poets Matthias Claudius and Friedrich Gottlieb Klopstock. Droste trusted Sprickmann's judgement and showed him many of her early works, including the unfinished tragedy Berta oder die Alpen ("Berta, or The Alps", 1813). Other examples of her juvenilia are the tale in verse Walter (1818) and a novel Ledwina (begun in 1819 but never completed).

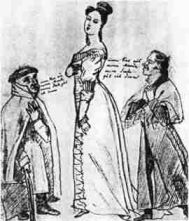
Droste-Hülshoff, torn between Heinrich Straube and August von Arnswaldt. Caricature by Ludwig Emil Grimm, 1820

In 1819–1820, Droste spent a year staying with the Haxthausen family at Schloss Bökerhof, interrupted only by a stay at the nearby spa town of Bad Driburg, where she hoped to find a cure for her health problems. Here she became romantically involved with Heinrich Straube (1794–1847), a Lutheran law student with literary interests, who was a friend of her uncle Baron August von Haxthausen. What happened next is unclear, but it appears that Droste's aunt, Baroness Anna von Haxthausen (who was in fact four years her junior), and other relatives at Schloss Bökerhof disapproved of Droste's decision to have a serious relationship with a commoner. For this reason, the Baroness von Haxthausen masterminded a society intrigue intended to destroy the relationship in a very public manner. While Straube was away pursuing his legal studies at the University of Göttingen, August von Arnswaldt, a Lutheran aristocrat with literary ambitions, pretended to pursue Droste romantically. At first flattered by von Arnswaldt's attentions, Droste gave some indications she was in love with him, before telling him she was committed to Heinrich Straube. By this time it was too late, as von Arnswaldt had all the evidence he needed. He traveled to Göttingen and gave Straube proof of Droste's behaviour. The two men wrote a joint letter (which has not been preserved), breaking off all contact with her. She never saw either man again. A few years later, August von Arnswaldt married a widowed Baroness Anna von Haxthausen, the ringleader of the intrigue. Straube became a lawyer in Kassel and married in 1824. When he died in 1847, a lock of Droste's hair was found among his possessions. The ensuing scandal was a catastrophe for Droste and severely damaged both her reputation and her marriage prospects. Feeling betrayed by the role that her own relatives had played, Droste refused to visit Schloss Bökerhof for the next 18 years.

Droste's earliest poems are derivative and conventional but in 1820 her work began to show marked originality when she embarked on a cycle of Christian poetry, Das geistliche Jahr ("The Spiritual Year"). Droste intended to write one poem for each Sunday and Feast Day of the church year and the cycle was meant as a gift to her devout grandmother, but when Droste had completed 25 poems, she realised they showed too many traces of major depression and spiritual doubt, so she shelved the work until 1839 when a friend persuaded her to complete the series. Even then she did not publish the poems and they only appeared posthumously in 1851.

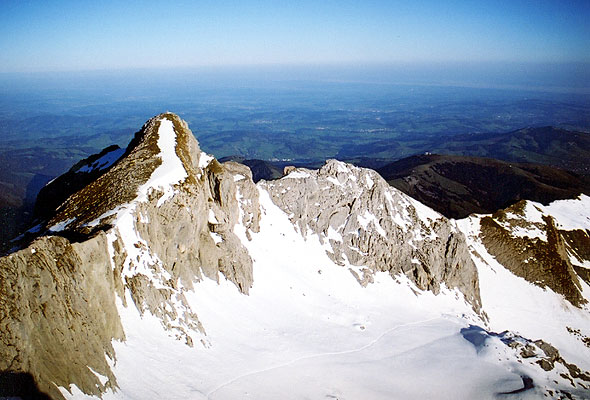
The Säntis, a mountain in the Alps near Schloss Eppishausen, which inspired Droste's poem "Der Säntis"

When her father died in 1826 she moved with her mother and sister to a small country estate near Hülshoff called Rüschhaus. Here she led a constricted, monotonous existence, broken only by a few trips to the Rhine and Bonn. She composed poetry, but not prolifically. In 1834 her sister Jenny married Baron Joseph von Laßberg, an important collector, editor, and publisher of medieval Middle High German epic poetry. The following summer, Annette and her mother travelled to visit Baron von Laßberg's estate of Schloss Eppishausen in the Swiss Alps. She was inspired by the scenery and easily befriended her brother in law, but neither he nor his friends shared her interest in modern German poetry and Droste's hopes that the baron might publish her work came to nothing.

Droste now entrusted the publication of her first book to two friends, Christoph Bernhard Schlüter and Wilhelm Junkmann. They had little experience of the literary world and chose the Münster-based publisher Aschendorff. Droste would have preferred a non-regional publisher rather than a Westphalian one as Westphalia had a reputation as a cultural backwater and few people bought books there. The collection appeared in 1838 in a print-run of 500 copies, of which only 74 were sold. It contained three long narrative poems (Das Hospiz auf dem großem Saint-Bernard, Das Vermächtnis des Arztes and Die Schlacht in Loener Bruch) and a handful of lyrics. Although they were issued under the name "Annette Elisabeth von D.H.", her family did not approve. Droste found the failure of her book "humiliating".

=== Literary success ===
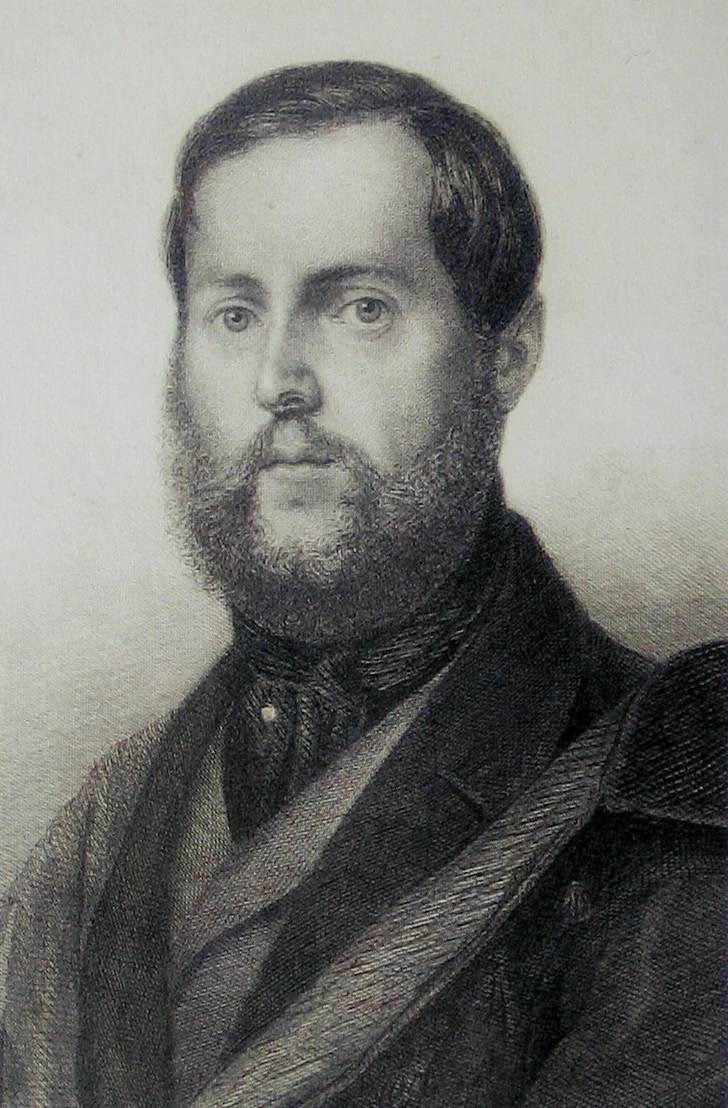
Levin Schücking

The year 1840 marked a turning point in her career, however. In 1838, Droste had begun to frequent a literary salon in Münster, presided over by Elise Rüdiger, the "Hecken-Schriftstellergesellschaft". One of its members was the young poet Levin Schücking. Droste had known his mother, the poet Katharina Schücking-Busch, and had first met Levin in 1831. Schücking had also published an admiring review of Droste's poetry collection and sought her help in writing his own book, Das malerische und romantische Westfalen ("Picturesque and Romantic Westphalia", 1840). The two soon formed a close friendship and Droste wrote a number of ballads for inclusion in the book, among them "Das Fräulein von Rodenschild" and "Der Tod des Erzbischofs Engelbert von Köln". Schücking encouraged her renewed literary creativity. In the winter of 1840/1841 she wrote her famous novella Die Judenbuche (The Jew's Beech, published 1842), inspired by a real murder near Bökerhof in the late 18th century. The following autumn and winter, Droste and Schücking stayed at her brother-in-law's castle at Meersburg on Lake Constance, where Schücking had been given the task of cataloguing Baron von Laßberg's private library. While there, Schücking told Droste that her talent lay in lyric poetry, which relied on rare moments of inspiration. Droste disagreed: she had no problem composing poetry in her head but had difficulty writing it down and the failure of her first book had not encouraged her to make the effort. Now she had a sympathetic reader in Schücking, she began to write in earnest, producing about fifty poems between October 1841 and April 1842. They include poems dedicated to Schücking, often on the theme of ageing (e.g. "Kein Wort", "O frage nicht"), and poems of self-analysis such as "Das Spiegelbild" ("The Image in the Mirror") and "Die Taxuswand" ("The Yew Hedge"), which looks back to her unhappy love affair with Straube. Other lyrics are the nature poems collected in the cycle "Heidebilder" ("Heath Pictures"), including such famous pieces as "Die Krähen" ("The Crows"), "Der Hünenstein", "Die Mergelgrube" ("The Marl Pit") and "Der Knabe im Moor" ("The Boy on the Moor"). These often have an element of magical realism and supernatural terror.

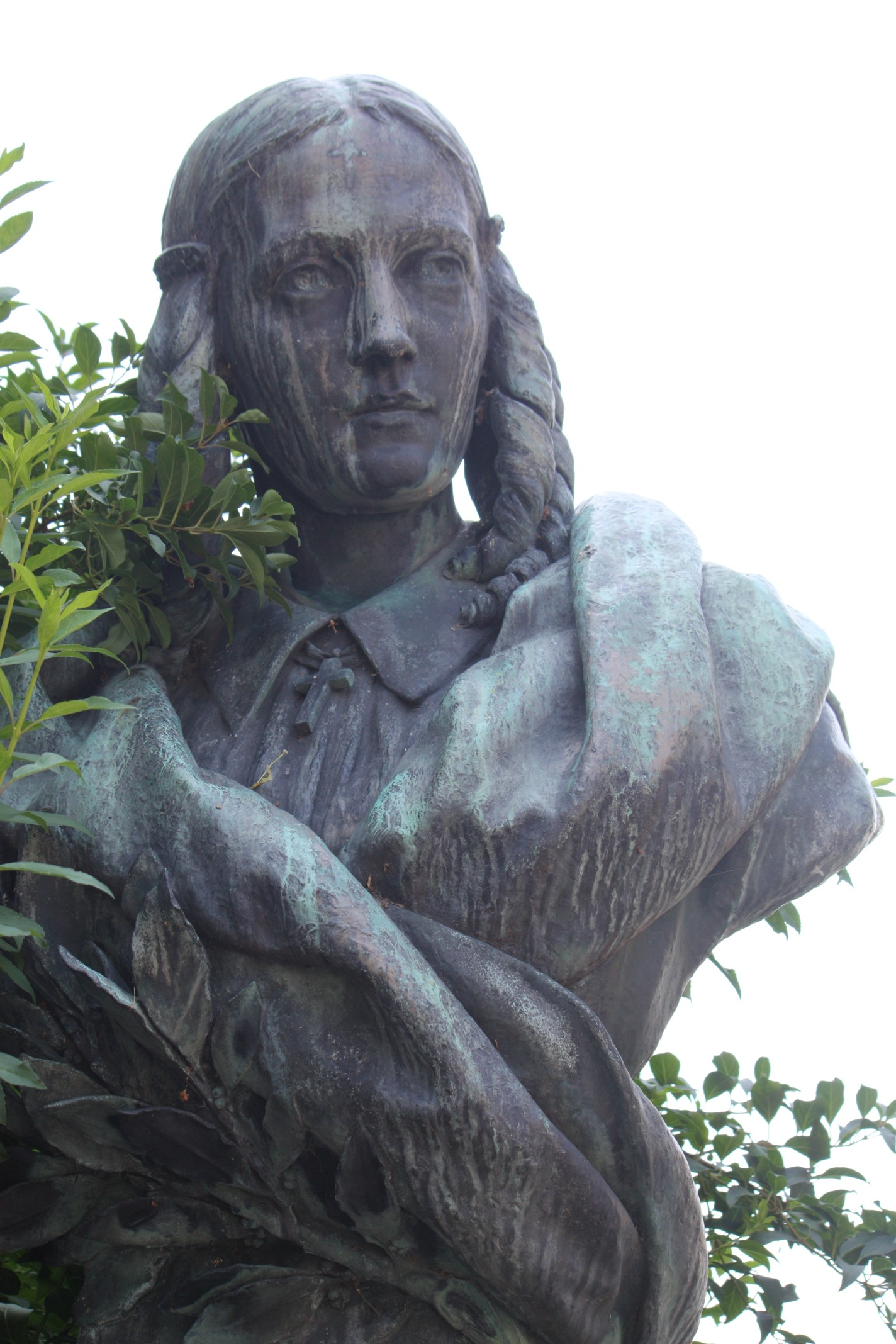
Statue of Droste in Meersburg, dated 1898

In April 1842, Schücking left Schloss Meersburg to take up a job as a tutor to an aristocratic family. Droste returned to Rüschhaus the same summer. The pair would never be so close again. Droste's literary productivity declined, but she did compose a few more poems, including the supernatural story "Spiritus familiaris". In September 1844, the prestigious publisher Cotta issued a large collection of her poems from the 1840s. This time Droste enjoyed great success and the book received admiring reviews from many important intellectual figures.

In 1844, Classical music composer Robert Schuman had become an admirer of her poetry, which he praised in a letter to Hans Christian Andersen. However, the poet declined Clara Schumann's request for an opera libretto on her husband's behalf, but Robert Schumann did set Droste's poem, "Das Hirtenfeuer", as Op. 59, no. 5. In time, Droste was acknowledged as the greatest female German author of the 19th century.

=== Final years ===
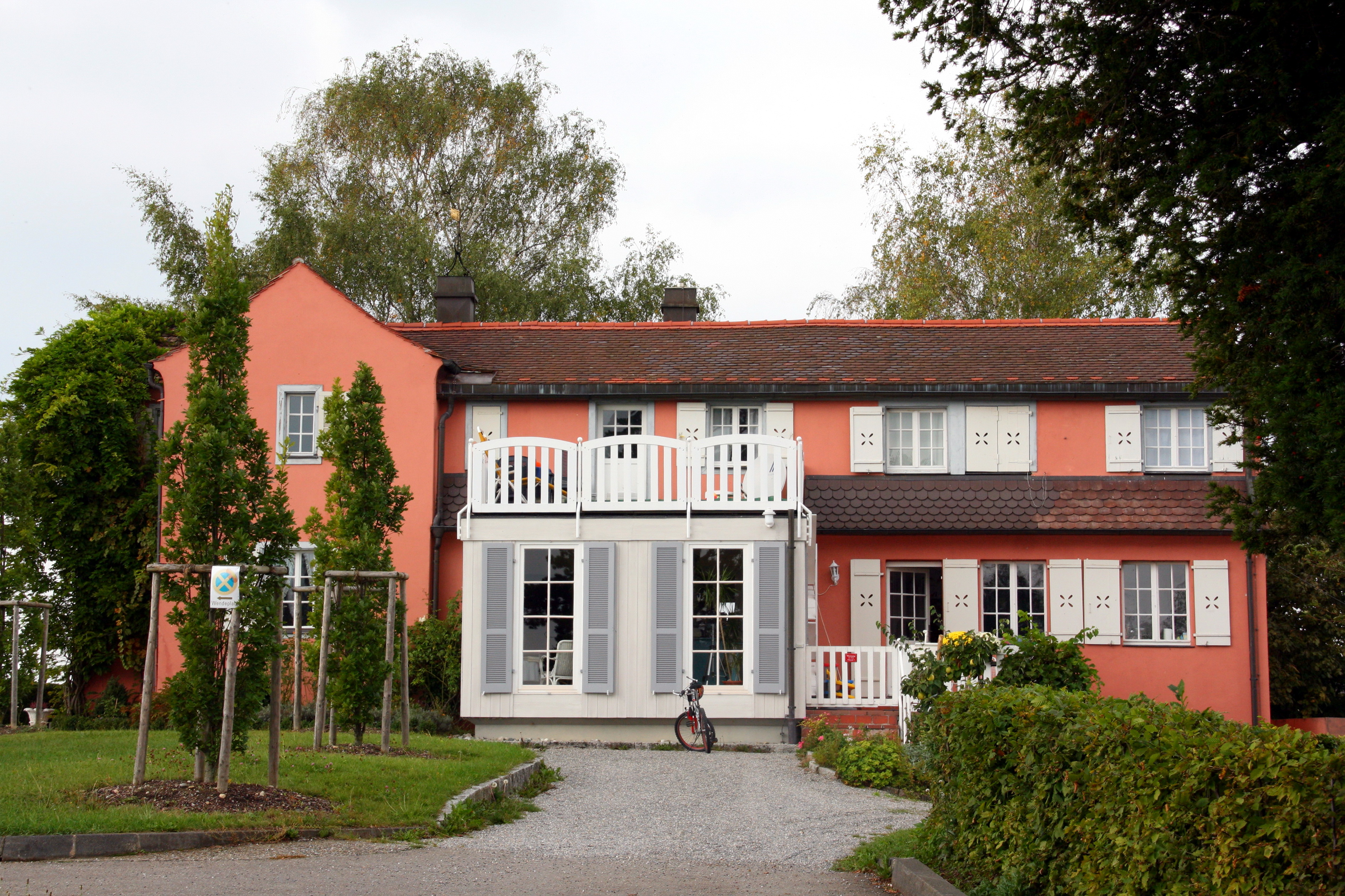
The "Little House", Droste's residence in Meersburg

Meanwhile, her relationship with Schücking had cooled. In 1843, Schücking had married Baroness Louise von Gall. When the couple visited Schloss Meersburg for four weeks in May 1844, the two women intensely disliked one another. Droste published a poem "Lebt wohl" ("Farewell") in the literary journal Morgenblatt, effectively saying goodbye to Schücking. Schücking also used his own literary works to mark his distance from Droste. In 1846, he published two novels. The first, Die Ritterbürtigen, contained a highly critical portrait of the Westphalian aristocracy. This caused Droste embarrassment as Schücking had made use of private information from conversations with her. The second novel, Eine dunkle Tat, included characters resembling himself and Droste. The character of Katharina, based on Droste, is maternal, controlling, possessive, and treats the protagonist as a substitute child. As a result of these publications and her dislike of Schücking's radical politics, Droste made a decisive break with him. Nevertheless, after Droste's death, Schücking helped publicise her works, publishing the collection of her final poems, Letzte Gaben, in 1860 and an edition of her collected works in 1878–9. Important poems from her last years include "Mondesaufgang" ("Moonrise"), "Durchwachte Nacht" ("Sleepless Night") and "Im Grase" ("In the Grass").

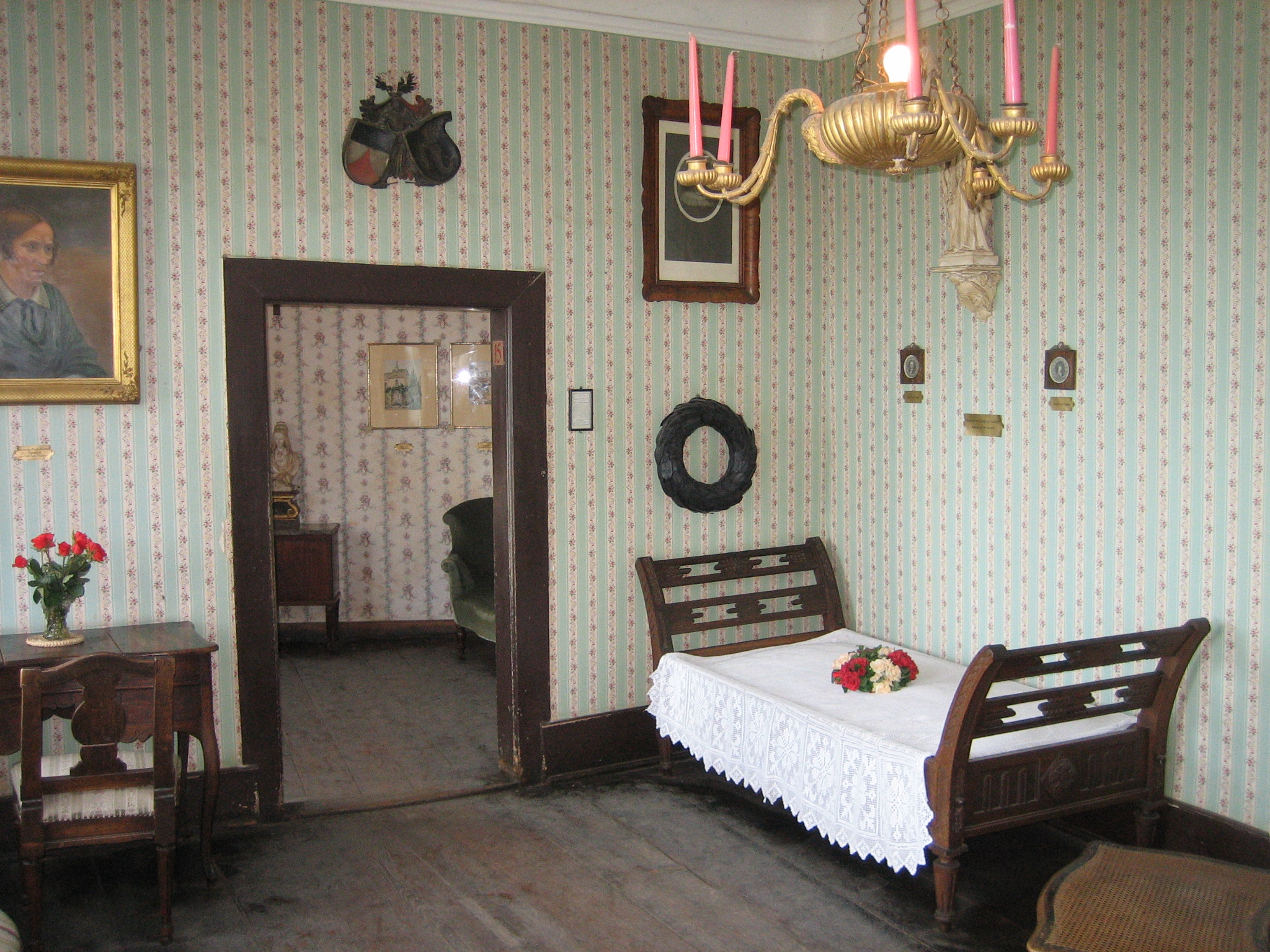
Droste's deathbed at Meersburg Castle

The profits from her book had helped Droste to buy a small vine-covered villa known as Fürstenhäusle in Meersburg, while renovating the house, she lived in her brother in law's Schloss from 1846 until her death in May 1848, probably from tuberculosis.

== Character of her poetry ==
The critic Margaret Atkinson wrote:

In the history of German poetry she is an isolated and independent figure. She shares with the Romantic writers an awareness of the power of man's imagination and a keen sense of his exposed and precarious position in a world of danger and mystery. But her poetry has none of the vagueness of emotional mood and the sweetness of sound that characterize theirs. Nor did she intend that it should. Indifferent to contemporary taste, she pursued her own ideals in her own way. Ich mag und will jetzt nicht berühmt werden, she once wrote, aber nach hundert Jahren möcht' ich gelesen werden. ("I do not want and do not intend to become famous now, but in a hundred years' time I would like to be read.") And indeed she was ahead of her time. Her keen sensory perception and her precise recording of phenomena make her appear as a herald of the new realistic literature of the latter part of the century. With her unusual combination of imaginative vision with close accurate observation and depiction of reality, she thus stands at the point of transition between Romanticism and Realism and does not belong wholly to either.

== Musical activity ==
Droste received early instruction in piano and later in singing. In 1821, her uncle Maximilian Friedrich von Droste zu Hülshoff, a composer and a friend of Joseph Haydn, gave her a composition manual, Einige Erklärungen über den General-Baß

== In popular culture ==
- In her native Havixbeck, the castle that is Droste's birthplace, Burg Hülshoff, is now a museum with a retrospective of her work and is open to the public.
- Asteroid 12240 Droste-Hülshoff, discovered by astronomer Freimut Börngen in 1988, was named in her memory.

== Works ==
- Gedichte (1838)
- Die Judenbuche (The Jew's Beech, novella, 1842)
- "Gedichte". spiegel.de. Archived from the original on 19 August 2002. (Poems, 1844)
- Westfälische Schilderungen ("Westphalian Illustrations", 1845)
- "Das geistliche Jahr". spiegel.de. Archived from the original on 17 March 2003. (The Spiritual Year, cycle of poems, 1851)
- "Letzte Gaben". spiegel.de. Archived from the original on 19 August 2002. ("Last Gifts", poems, 1860)
- "Briefe von Annette von Droste-Hülshoff und Levin Schücking". spiegel.de. Archived from the original on 4 June 2003. (Letters from Annette von Droste-Hülshoff and Levin Schücking)
- Lieder mit Pianoforte-Begleitung. Componirt von Annette von Droste-Hülshoff (Songs, posthumously edited 1871 by Christoph Bernhard Schlüter)
