= Meersburg =

- Town
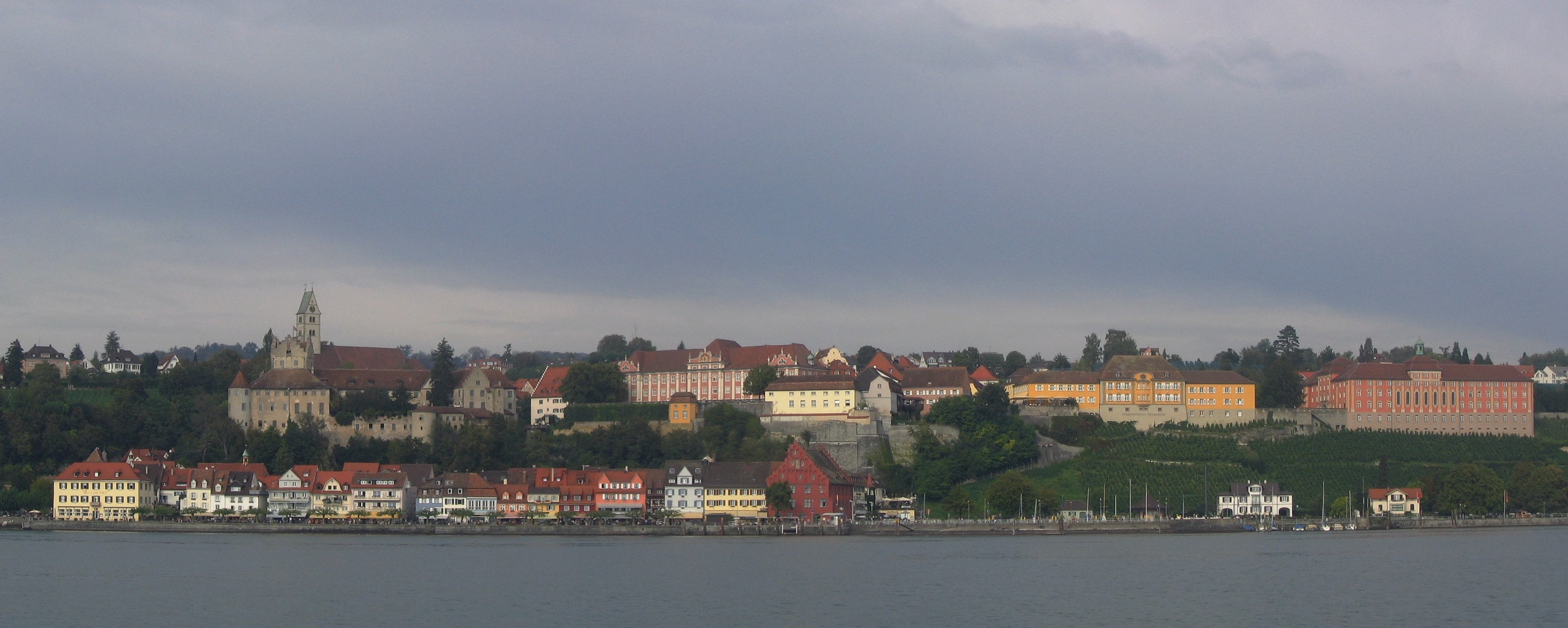

- Coat of arms

- Location of Meersburg within Bodenseekreis district
- Interactive map of Meersburg
- Location within Germany Location within Baden-Württemberg
- Coordinates: 47°42′N 9°16′E
- Country: Germany
- State: Baden-Württemberg
- Admin. region: Tübingen
- District: Bodenseekreis
- Municipal assoc.: Meersburg

Government
  - Mayor (2017–25): Robert Scherer

Area
  - Total: 12.07 km^{2} (4.66 sq mi)
- Elevation: 444 m (1,457 ft)

Population (2025-12-31)
  - Total: 6,019
  - Density: 498.7/km^{2} (1,292/sq mi)
- Time zone: UTC+01:00 (CET)
  - Summer (DST): UTC+02:00 (CEST)
- Postal codes: 88709
- Dialling codes: 07532
- Vehicle registration: FN / ÜB
- Website: www.meersburg.de

Meersburg (German pronunciation: [ˈmeːɐ̯sbʊʁk]) is a town in Baden-Württemberg in the southwest of Germany. It is on Lake Constance.

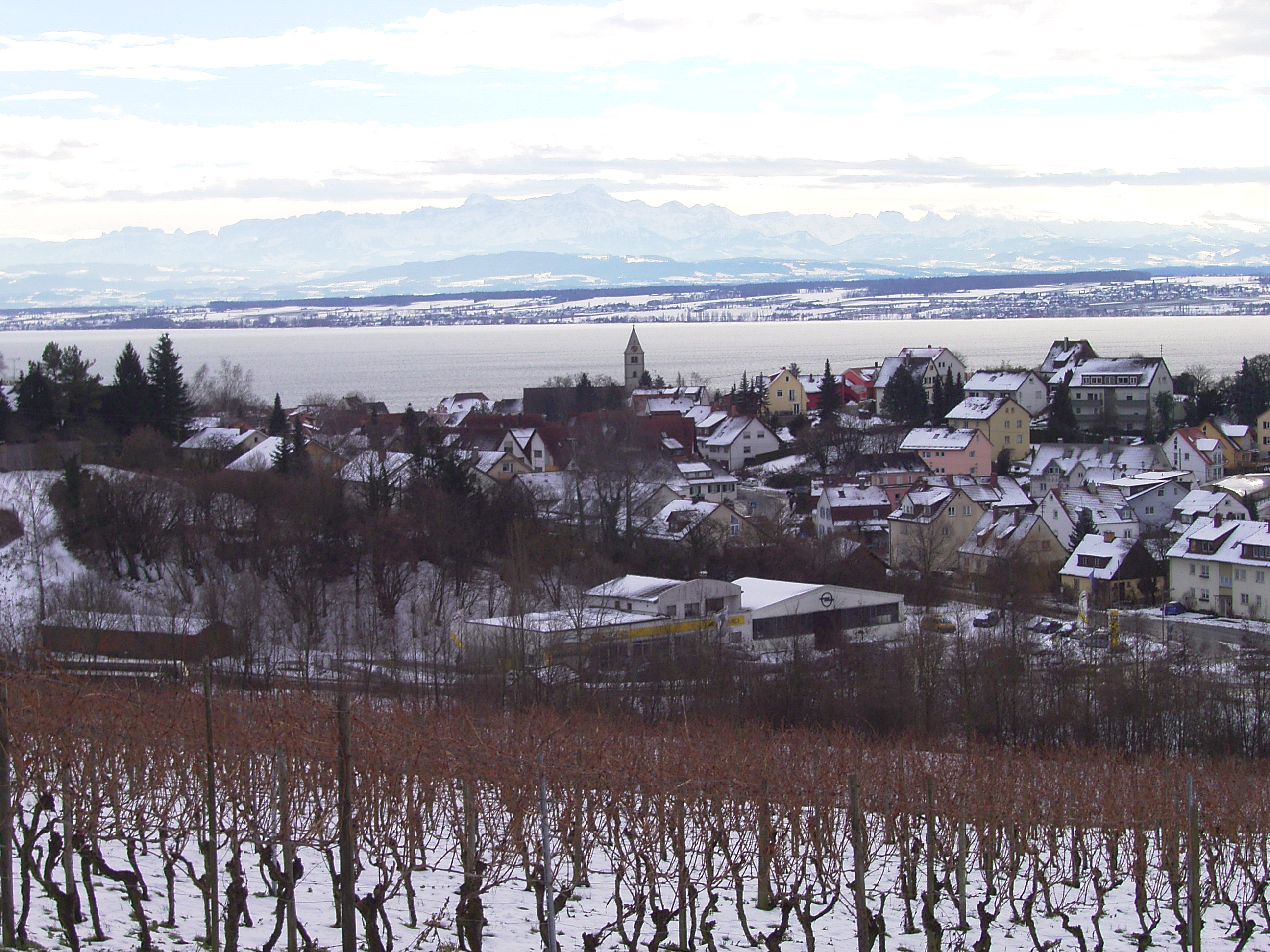
Vineyards, Meersburg, Lake Constance and Alps

Meersburg 2010

It is known for its medieval city. The lower town ("Unterstadt") and upper town ("Oberstadt") are reserved for pedestrians only, and connected by two stairways and a steep street ("Steigstrasse").

== History ==
The name of the town means "Castle on the Sea", referring to a castle which, according to a tradition from 1548, was built here in 630 by the Merovingian king Dagobert I.

The commune obtained the status of free city in 1299, though nominally still under the Bishop of Constance. In 1803 it was annexed to the Electorate of Baden.

After World War II, Meersburg was in the French military occupation area in Germany.

== Main sights ==
The town is home to two castles, the Old Castle and the New Castle. The Old Castle, built by Merovingian King Dagobert I in the seventh century, is one of the oldest surviving castles in Germany. It is in private ownership. A self-guided tour is available. German poet Annette von Droste-Hülshoff lived there for eight years and purchased the Prince's House. The New Castle was built in the eighteenth century. Originally the residence of the bishop of Constance, it was used for various purposes after the Secularization of 1803. It is now a museum. There is also an expanse of half-timbered houses, and two medieval town gates, which are the remains of the fortification.

== Transport ==
Meersburg is the northern terminus of a car ferry service to Constance. On the opposite side Meersburg is connected to the region by the B 31, a major road that leads from Breisach (on the French border) to Lindau (on the Austrian border), largely bypassing all parts of Meersburg. To exit to Meersburg and to get to the car ferry, one takes B 33 to Meersburg and Constance.

Meersburg is also reachable by pleasure boat services from Lake Constance to Überlingen (to the west), to Lindau, Bregenz (to the east) and to Constance opposite.

== Famous people ==
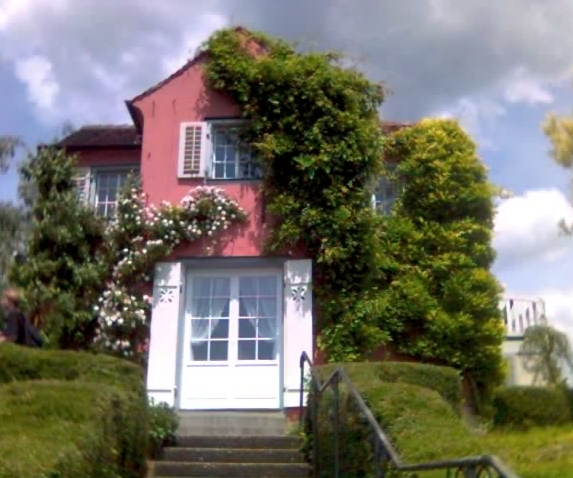
Fürstenhäusle, property of poet Annette von Droste-Hülshoff

One of Germany's most celebrated poets, Annette von Droste-Hülshoff, lived her final years at Meersburg Castle, from 1841–1848. She also owned the small vine-covered villa known as Fürstenhäusle.

The famous eighteenth-century doctor Franz Anton Mesmer (from whose name the verb "to mesmerize" derives) died in 1815 in Meersburg and is buried near the old wall of the graveyard about 0.5 kilometres (0.3 miles) northeast of the upper town-gate "Obertor" (see picture beneath).

=== others ===
- Stefan Lochner (c.1410–1451) German painter working in the late "soft style" of the International Gothic.
- Hugo von Hohenlandenberg (c.1457–1532 in Meersburg) Bishop of Konstanz.
- Hieronymus Harder (1523–1607) German botanist and teacher of Latin.
- Baron Joseph Maria Christoph von Lassberg (1770–1855) German antiquary, lived at Meersburg Castle from 1838.
- Friedrich August Walchner (1799–1865) German geologist, chemist and mineralogist.
- Levin Schücking (1814–1883) German novelist, lived at Meersburg Castle 1841/1843.
- Robert Eberle (1815–1862), German animal painter
- Fritz Mauthner (1849–1923 in Meersburg) Austro-Hungarian novelist, theatre critic, satirist, and exponent of philosophical skepticism.
- Markus Baur (born 1971) former German handball player now turned trainer

== Viticulture ==
The Meersburg vineyards at the northern banks of Lake Constance are famous within Germany. The rosée "Weissherbst" wine is a specialty of the region.

== International relations ==
Meersburg is twinned with:

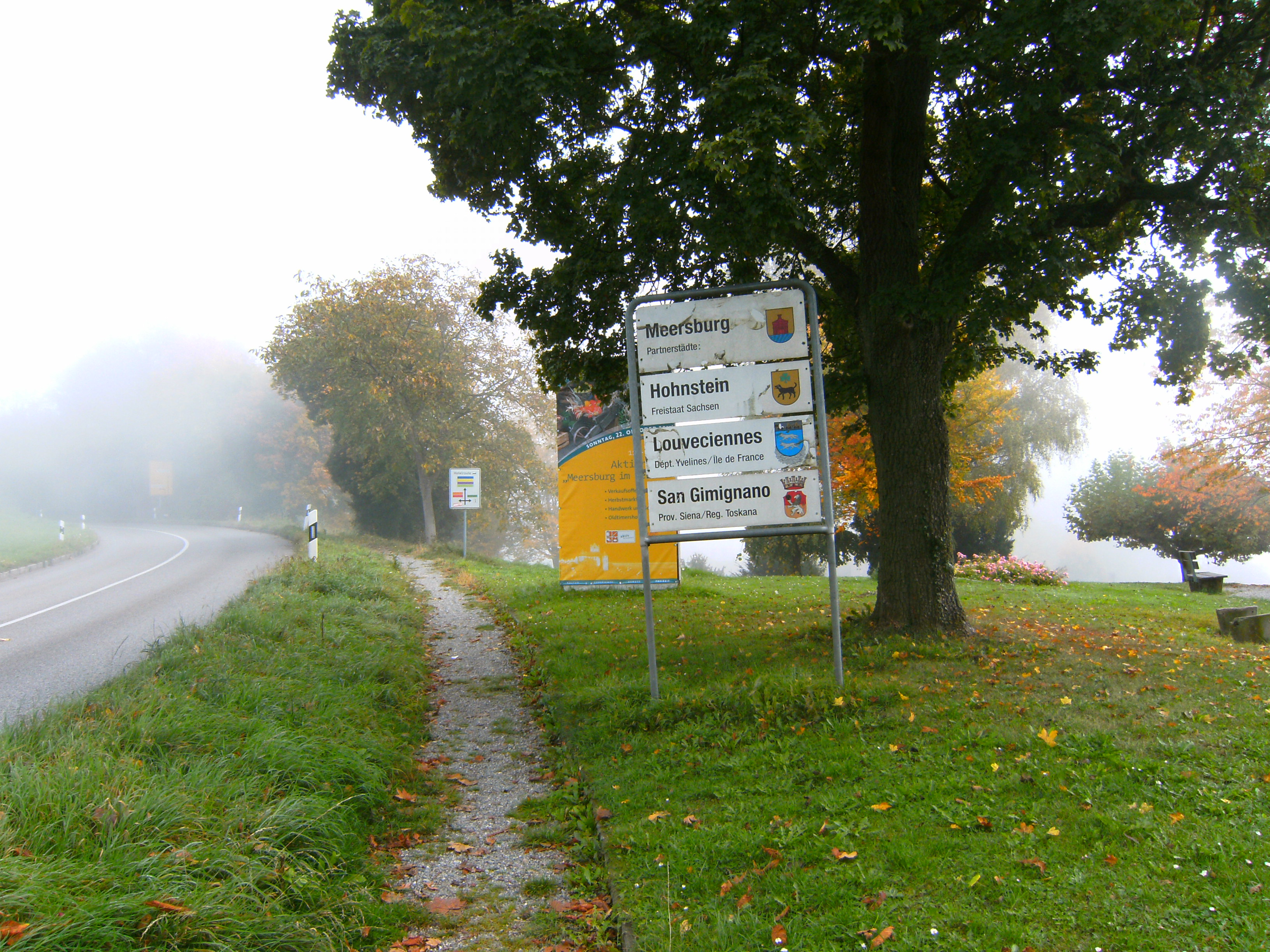
Meersburg, Germany, Bundesstraße 33, Dr.-Moll-Platz: Sign with the twin-towns of Meersburg

- Hohnstein, Saxony, Germany – since 1991
- Louveciennes, France – since 1991
- San Gimignano, Italy – since 2002

== Gallery ==
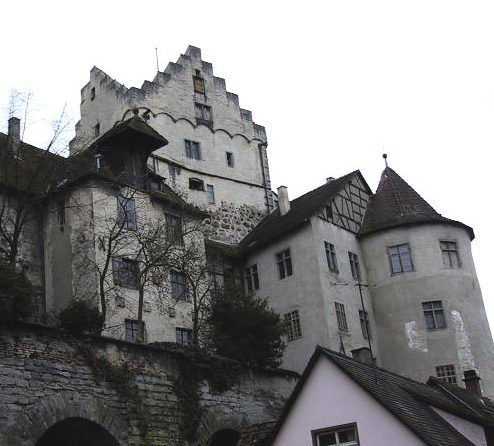
Old castle of Meersburg

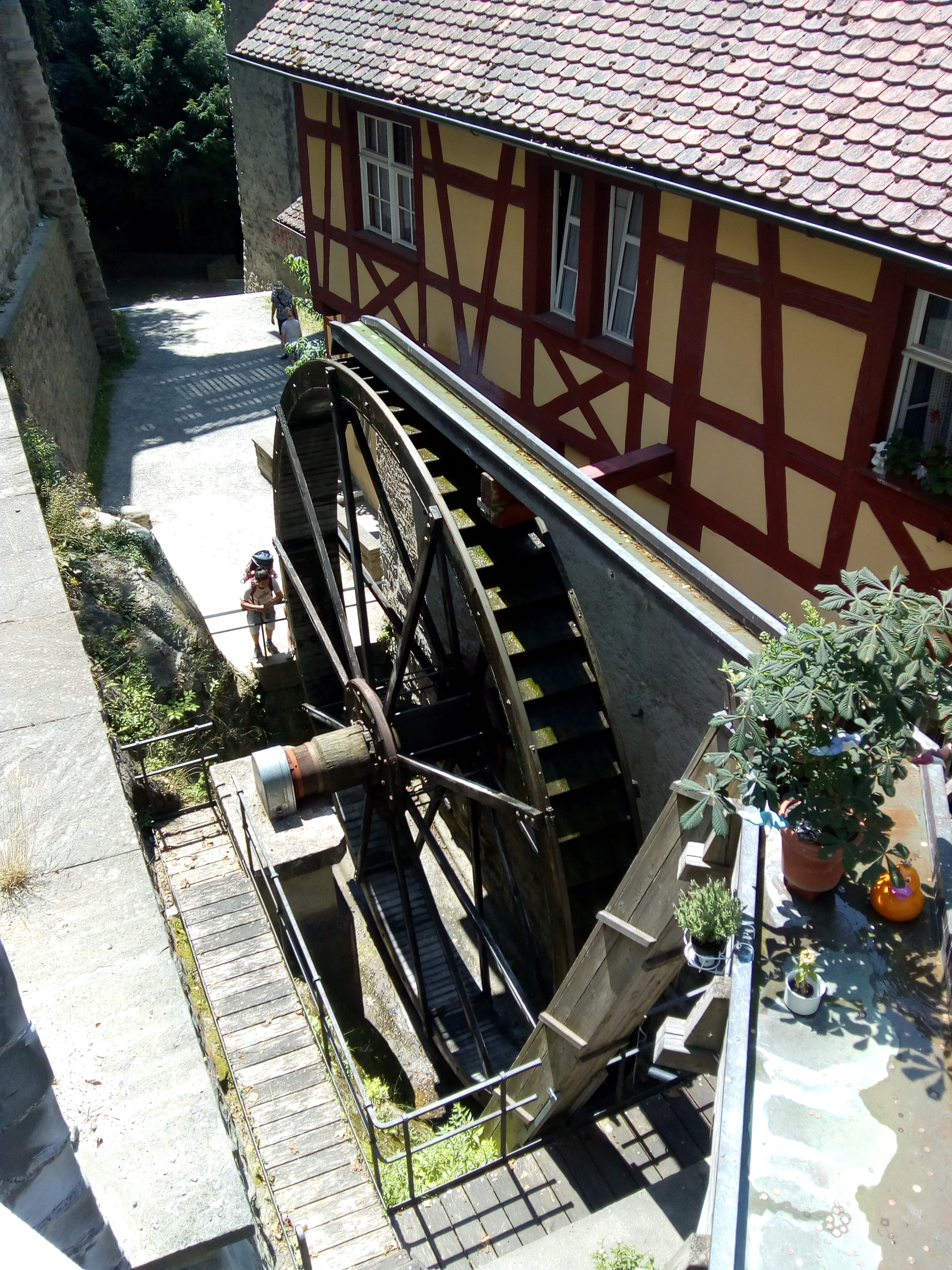
Half-timbered water mill, now private house near the Altes Schloss, Meersburg

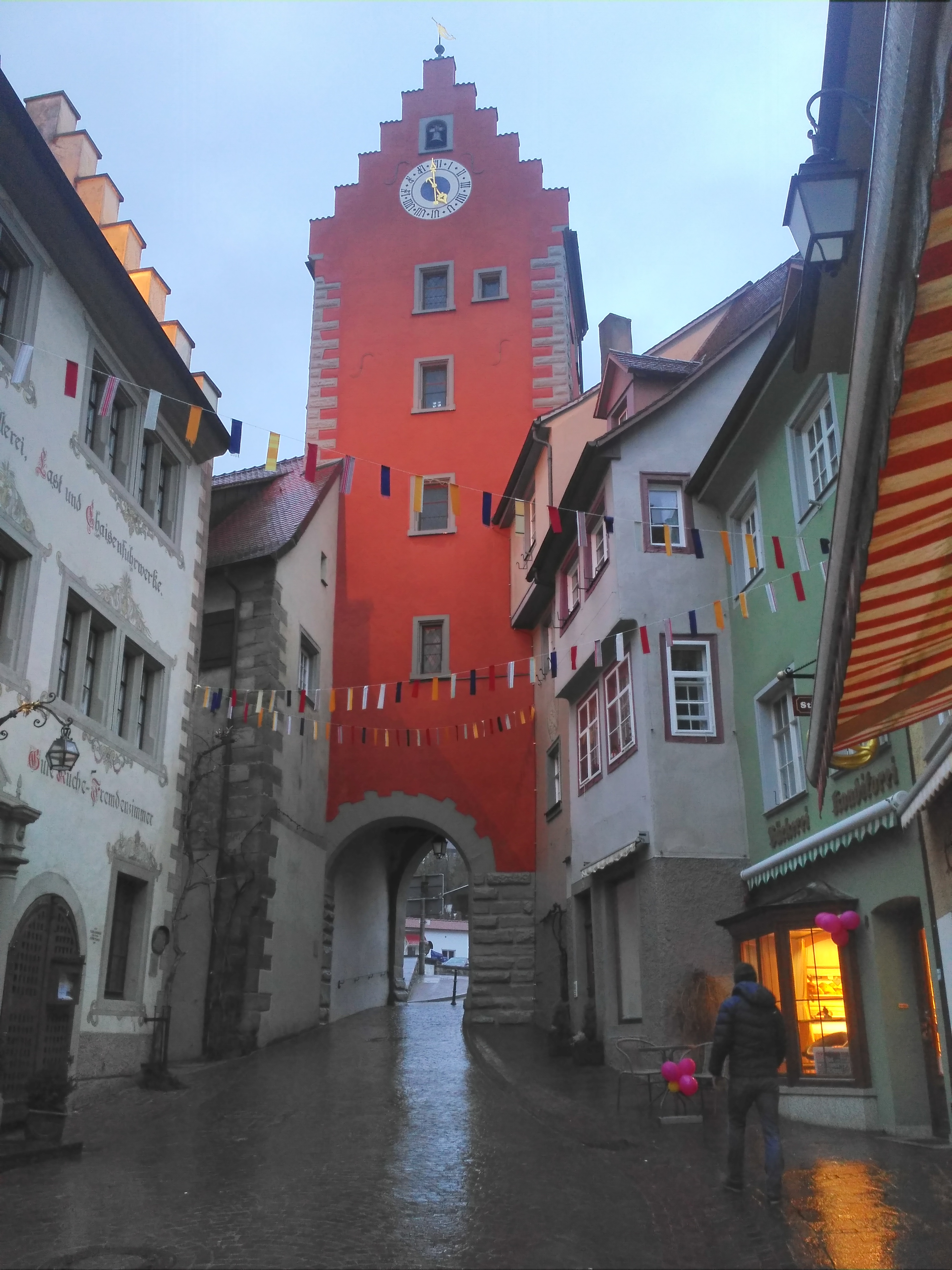
City gate

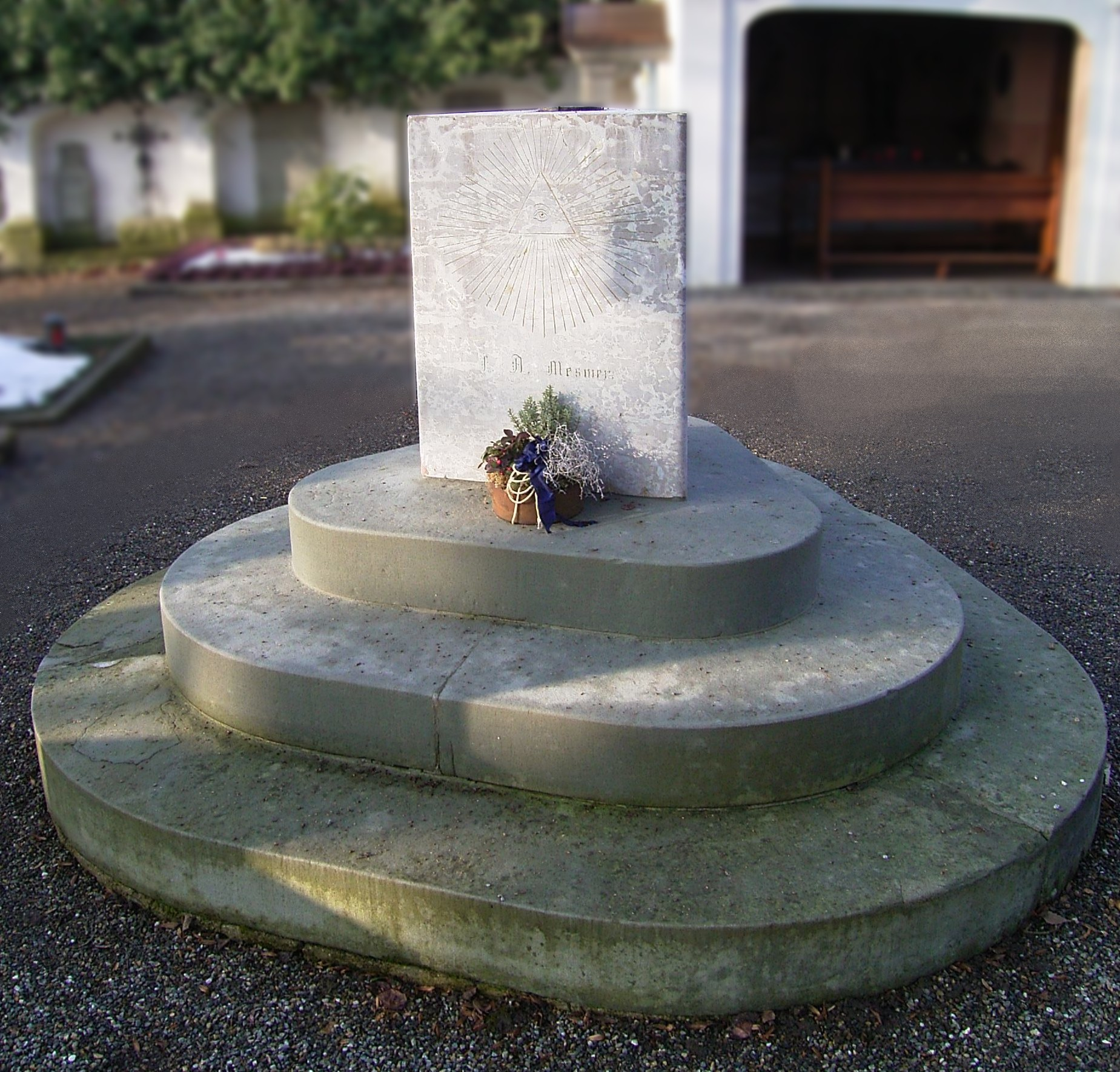
Gravestone of Franz Anton Mesmer in Meersburg

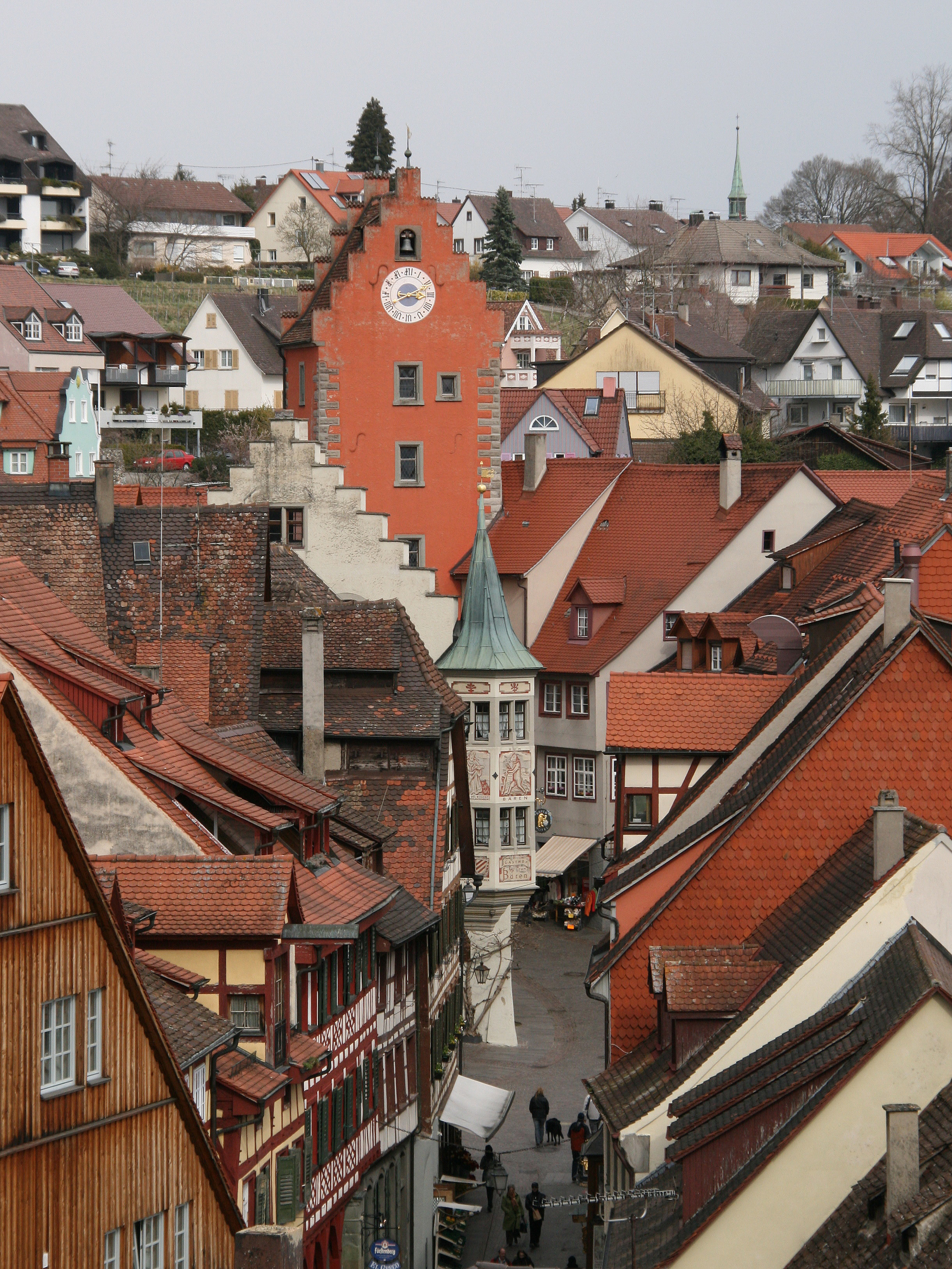
View of the centre of the upper town
