= Meersburg Castle =

Castle in Baden-Württemberg, Germany

Coordinates: 47°41′38″N 9°16′13″E

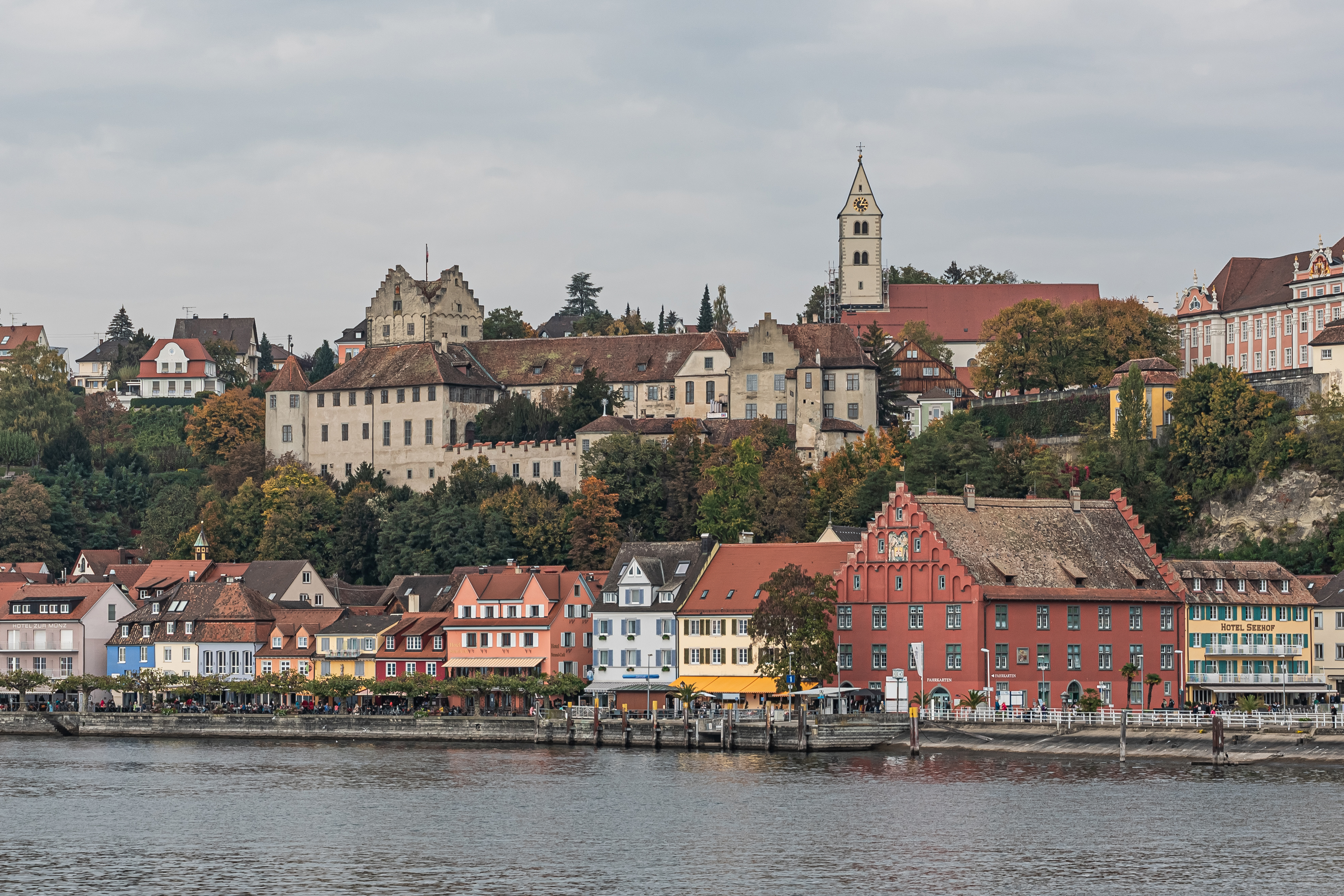
Burg Meersburg and the town of Meersburg, from Lake Constance

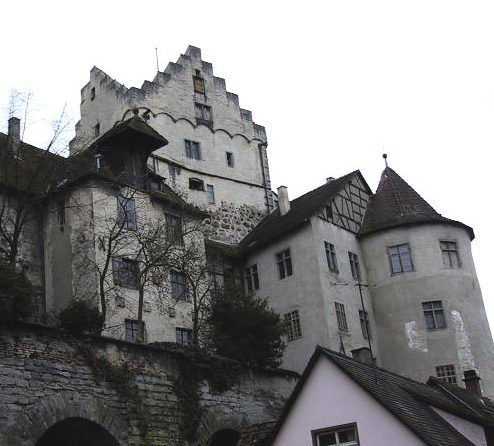
Burg Meersburg from the Steigstraße below the castle

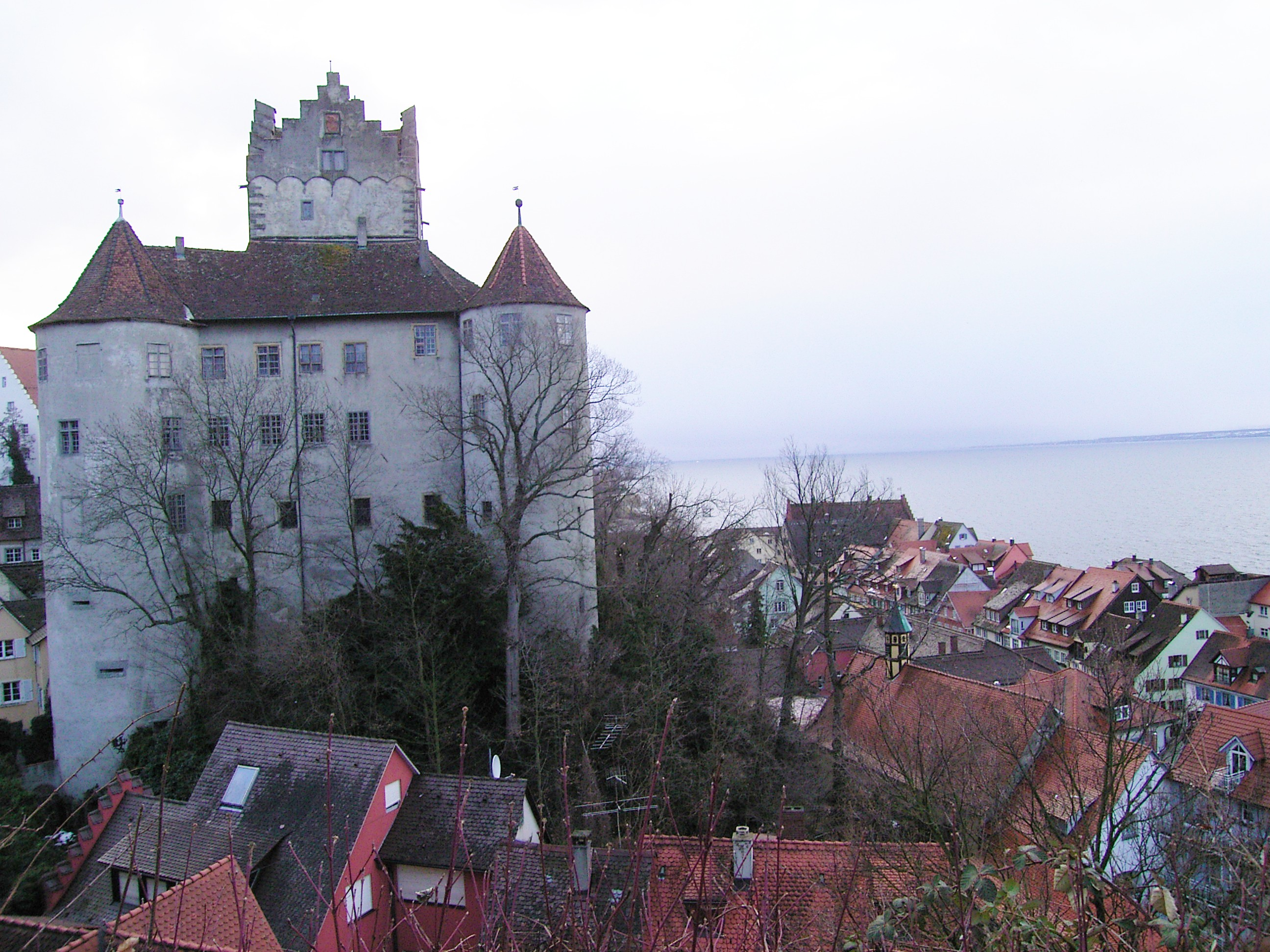
Northwest side of the castle, Lake Constance is in the background

Meersburg Castle (German: Burg Meersburg), also known as the Alte Burg (English: Old Castle), in Meersburg on Lake Constance in Baden-Württemberg, Germany, is considered to be one of the oldest inhabited castles in Germany. The central tower was first built during the 7th century, though the original structure is no longer visible. Burg Meersburg is known as the old castle, in the reference to the neighboring 18th century New Castle.

== Location ==
The Burg Meersburg is located on a rocky outcropping near Lake Constance (German: Bodensee). The castle is located about 440 m above sea level and towers above the Lower City, but is about level with the rest of the city.

== History ==
=== Construction theories ===
There are two theories about the construction of the Meersburg. The first is that the Merovingian king Dagobert I built the Dagobertturm (Dagobert's Tower), the central keep of the Meersburg, in 630. Around 630, Dagobert was in the Lake Constance region working on the Christianization of the Alamanni. This theory is based on a source from 1548, and was supported by Joseph von Laßberg who lived in the castle during the 19th century. A charter issued by Frederick Barbarossa on 27 November 1155, citing older, questionable sources, mentions that the boundaries of the Bishopric of Constance were established by Dagobert himself indicating that Dagobert was personally involved in establishing rulers in the region.

The second theory is that the castle was built in the early 12th century, and based on the name of the tower an association with the earlier Merovingian king was created. It is based on the observation that in the Lake Constance region there are no records of any castles being founded in the 7th century, but in the 12th century to early 13th century many castles were built in the region. The Merdesburch Castle was first mentioned in 1113, which implies a construction date before the early 12th century.

The stones at the base of the Dagobertturm are very large roughly squared stones that according to architectural history could date from either the 7th century or from the 12th century to early 13th century. Because the stones could have come from either era, it is not clear which theory is correct. However, similarities between the Meersburg and other 12th-century castles have been noted.

Joseph von Laßberg also presents the theory that the tower was built on the site of an earlier destroyed castle. He states that the castle was destroyed by Duke Gotfrid of Alemannia who was at war with Dagobert's successor and rebuilt 80 years later by Charles Martel. From 730 until 911 the Meersburg was a Carolingian castle and owned by the Counts of Linzgau, but administered by the Counts of Buchhorn. Following the extinction of the Buchhorn line, it would have passed to the Counts of Welf. A contract between the Counts of Welf and the Bishopric of Constance indicated that the Meersburg would be given to the Bishopric if the count died without any male heirs. It appears that the Welfs and the Bishopric had close ties, as Bishop Conrad was of Welf descent.

=== Seat of the Prince-Bishops of Constance ===
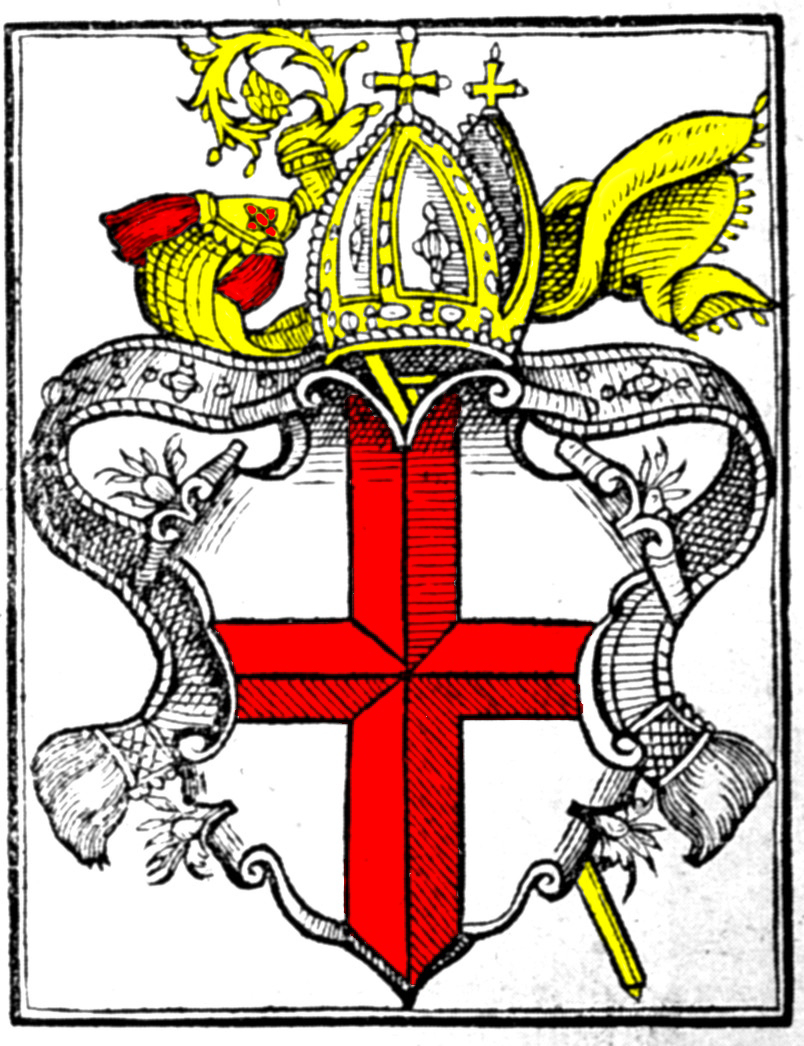
Coat of arms of the Bishop of Constance

The castle may have been owned by several different lords during the following centuries. It appears that the castle was owned by the Hohenstaufens for a while, because in 1213 King Frederick II celebrated the Holy Week in Meersburg. Then, in 1233 Meersburg was granted the weekly market right by Frederick II. Shortly before his death in 1254, Conrad IV, having been deposed and excommunicated by Pope Innocent IV asked Eberhard II, the High Steward of Meersburg to care for his two-year-old son Conradin. In 1261 Conradin became the Duke of Swabia, raising an army in the Ravensburg area. He departed from Meersburg to head south into Italy to fight Charles I of Anjou and attempt to reclaim the titles stripped by the Pope from his father. While Conradin was able to take Rome, he was soon afterward captured and executed.

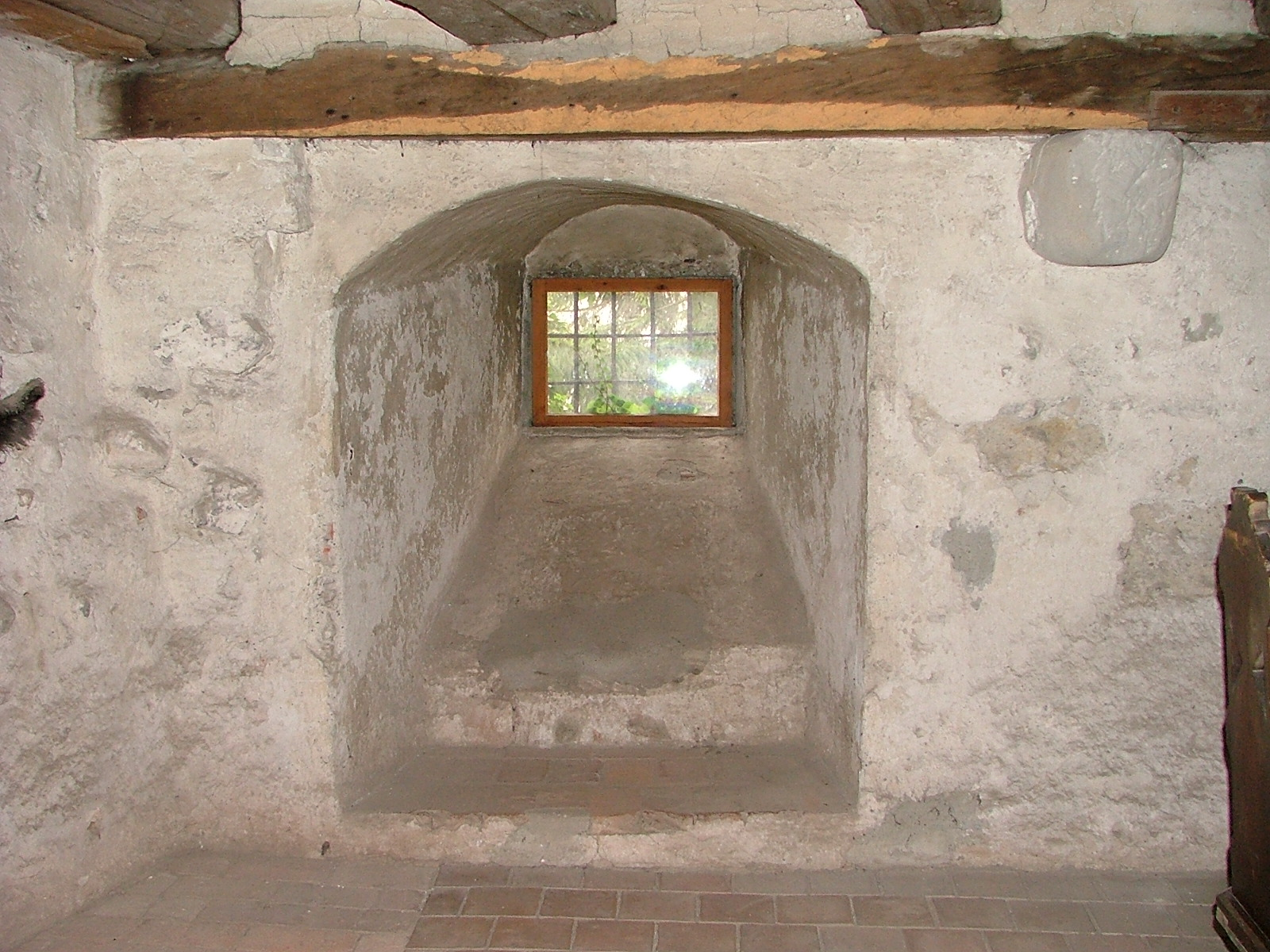
Window of the Guards' Room at the castle. The walls are nearly 3m thick which creates this large opening to a small window

A few years later, in 1268 the castle came totally under the ownership of the Bishopric of Constance

However, even as a residence for a bishop, the Meersburg was the site of several battles over the following centuries. In 1334, there were two candidates for the position of Bishop of Constance. Baron Nikolaus I of Kenzingen was elected bishop by supporters of the Pope while Albrecht of Hohenberg was chosen by the Holy Roman Emperor. Nikolaus quickly traveled to Avignon, in France the seat of Pope John XXII to have his appointment confirmed. He then returned to Meersburg and quickly had the defenses improved. Albrecht, meanwhile, had raised an army from the southern German princes and was joined by an Imperial army led by the Emperor. During the summer of 1334, the Imperial army besieged Burg Meersburg. During the siege, cannons were used for the first time in Germany. However, even with the new gunpowder weapons the Imperial troops were unable to take the castle. At the end of August, Emperor Louis IV was growing tired of the siege. When Duke Otto of Austria requested his help against the Bohemians, Louis left Meersburg and confirmed Nikolaus as bishop. Albrecht was granted the Bishopric of Würzburg in 1345 to replace the lost Bishopric.

Following Nikolaus, Urich Pfefferhardt was bishop from 1345 until 1351. In 1352 Johann III Windlock from Constance was installed at the castle, he proved to be an autocratic ruler and was disliked by the people and local nobles. Following a dispute with Konrad of Homberg-Markdorf and the Abbot Eberhard of Reichenau, he was killed by soldiers while in his palace in Constance.

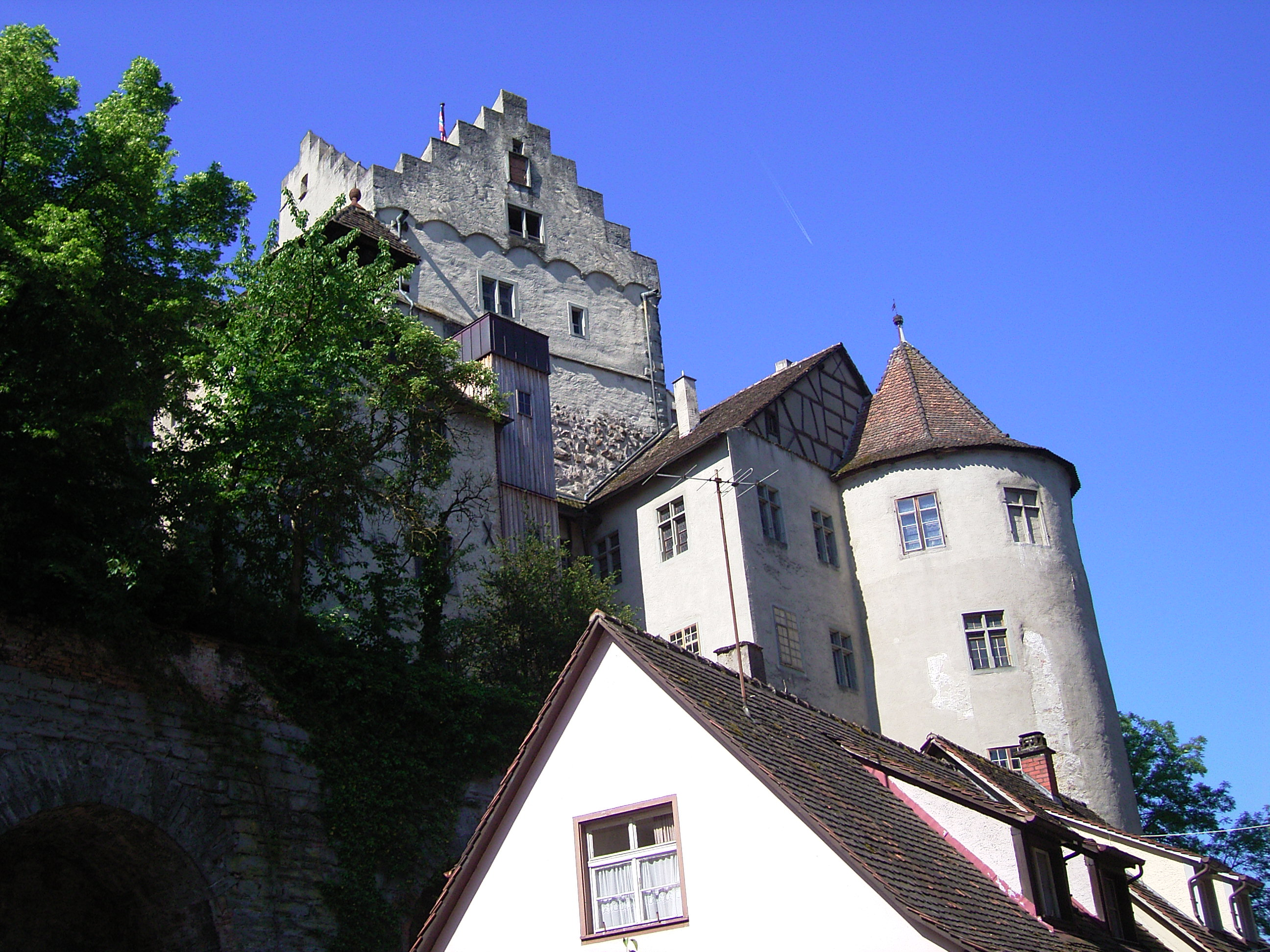
View of the Dagobert's tower, showing the Crow-stepped gable (stepped roofline instead of a smooth one)

Over the next century at least thirteen other Bishops were installed. Then in 1436 Heinrich IV of Hewen was appointed bishop. His belligerent and arbitrary style caused friction between himself and the town. Following a riot, the town was fined 4,000 florins for breaking the peace within the castle grounds. Later attempts by the town to secure Free Imperial City status led to further hostilities in 1457. The inhabitants of the city stormed the castle and captured it. Bishop Heinrich responded by besieging the city. Following intervention by Siegmund of Austria as well as Constance and Zürich a compromise was reached. Heinrich then withdrew, but attacked the city a short while later. Catching the citizens off guard, his soldiers stormed the city and captured all the leaders of the revolution. Heinrich executed the leaders of the rebellion and stripped rights away from the city.

The crow-stepped gable (a stepped roof line instead of a smooth roof line) on the tower was added by the Constance Prince-Bishop Hugo von Hohenlandenberg (Served 1496–1532). Before his time, the Meersburg was a summer residence of the bishops. Following a conflict with the city of Constance in 1526, Hugo moved to the Meersburg. The castle remained the bishops' primary residence until the move to the New Schloss in the 18th century.

In 1647 the castle was attacked by Swedish troops during the Thirty Years' War, however only the roof timbers were burned during the attack.

During the beginning of the 18th century, the bishops began to build the New Castle at Meersburg as a modern residence castle. After 1750 the old castle served as a house for the administration of the city.

=== Secularization ===
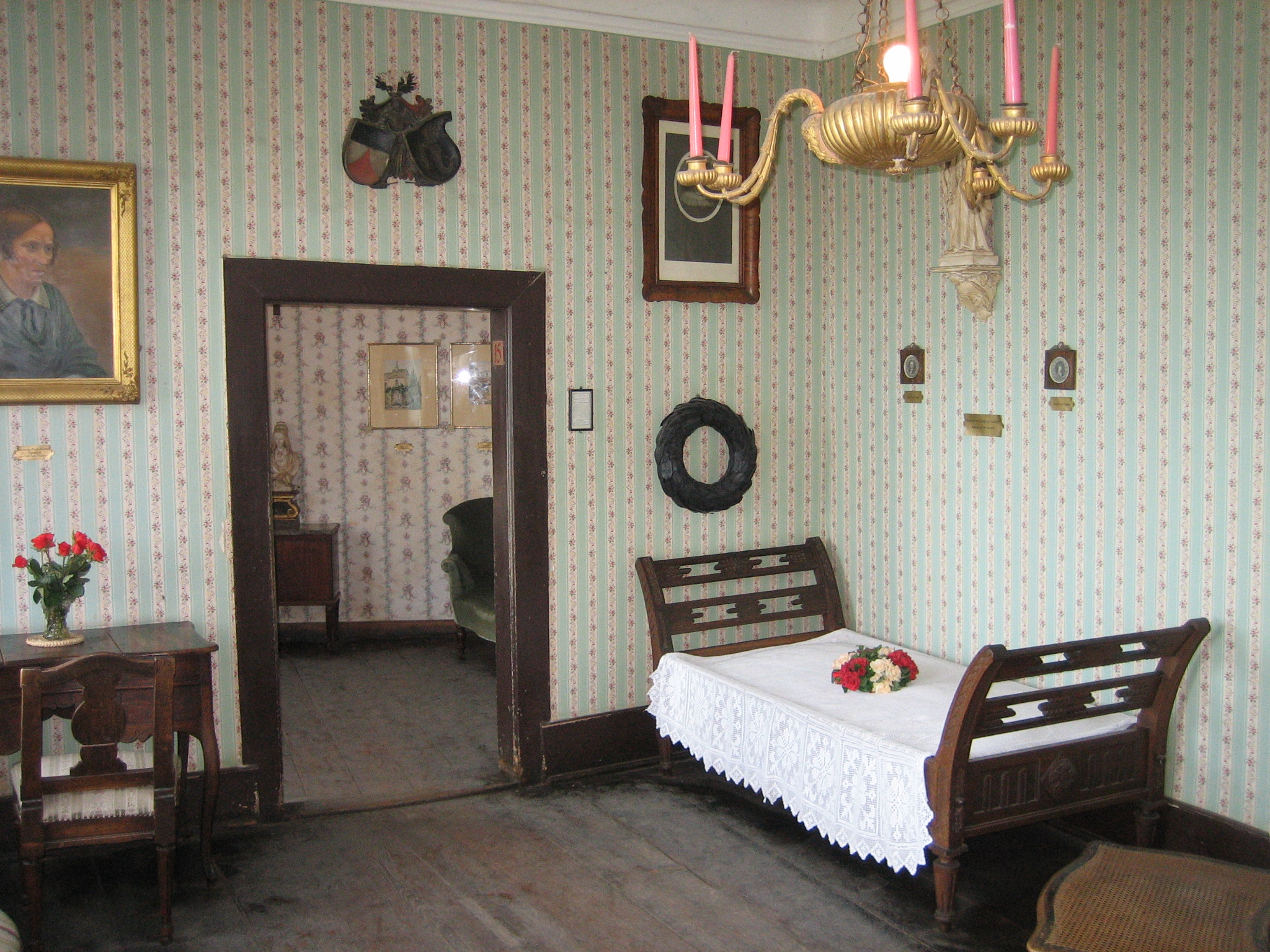
The German poet Annette von Droste-Hülshoffs deathbed at Castle Meersburg

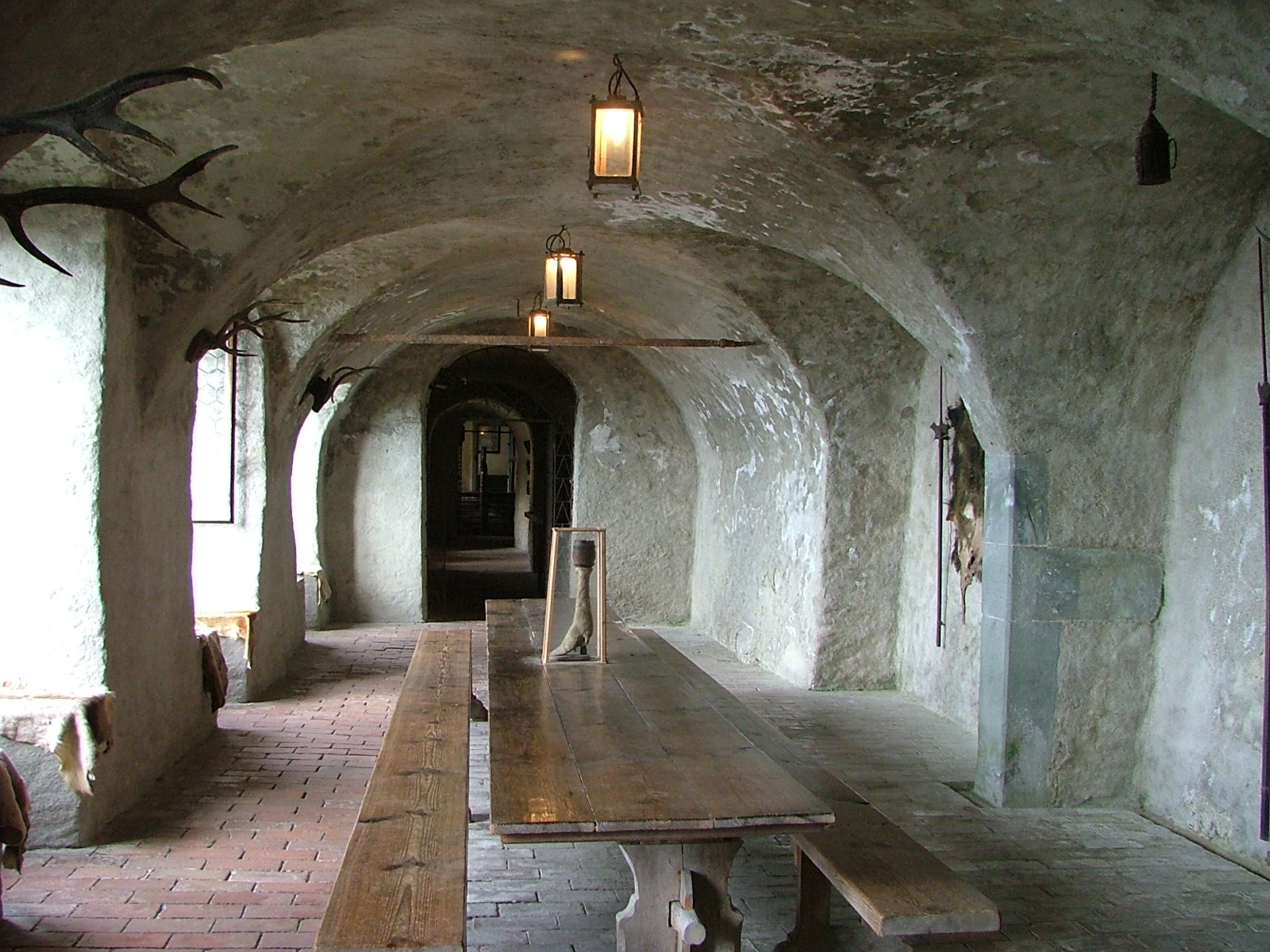
The Knight's Hall at the castle. The hall is decorated in the style of the 13th century

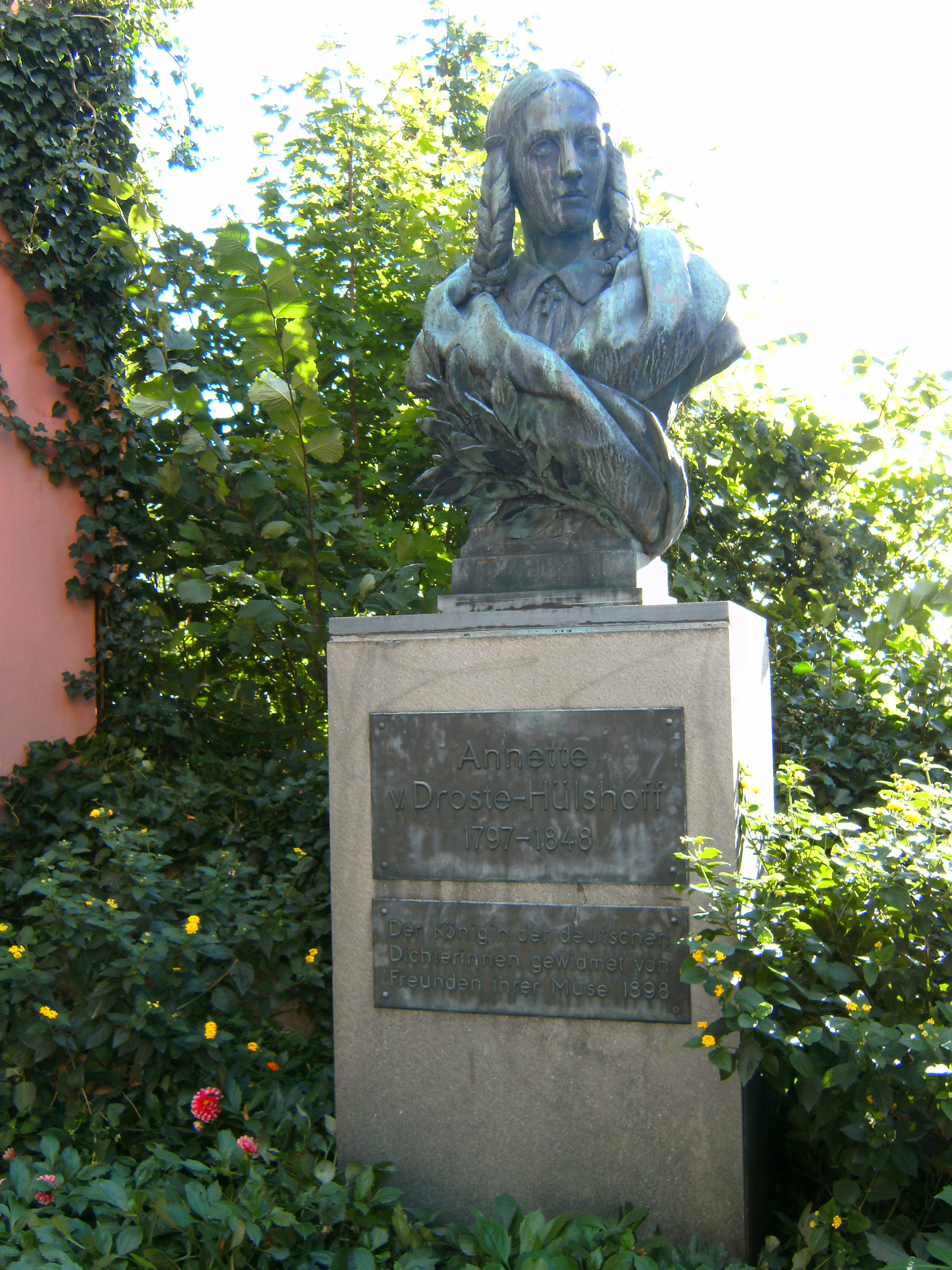
Meersburg, Germany, Meersburg Castle, at the entrance: Bust of Annette von Droste Hülshoff

In the Secularization of 1803 the Meersburg came under the control of the Grand Duchy of Baden. In 1838 the Grand Duke sold the castle to a private owner. The collector Joseph von Laßberg and his wife Baroness Maria Anna von Droste-Hülshoff, who was also called Jenny, acquired the castle. In 1841 Jenny's sister Annette von Droste-Hülshoff, the famous German poet, moved to the castle where she would spend the last eight years of her life. Following the death of the Laßbergs, the castle went to their twin daughters, Hildegard and Hildegunde. However, they were unable to afford the upkeep and sold the castle in 1877. Karl Mayer von Mayerfels from Munich bought the castle and established a Medieval Museum in the castle. Today portions of the castle are open to visitors on self-guided tours. The remainder of the castle is occupied by his descendants.

== See also ==
- List of castles in Baden-Württemberg
- Meersburg
- Little House, Meersburg
