= Die Judenbuche =

1842 novella by Annette von Droste-Hülshoff

- Short story by Annette von Droste-Hülshoff
- Translator: Lionel and Doris Thomas
- Country: Germany
- Language: German

Publication
- Published in: Morgenblatt für gebildete Stände
- Publisher: Cotta'sche Verlagsbuchhandlung
- Publication date: 1842
- Published in English: 1958

Die Judenbuche, translated as The Jew's Beech or The Jew's Beech-Tree, is a German novella written by Annette von Droste-Hülshoff and first published in 1842. The story about the unsolved murder of a Jewish citizen in a village in the Westphalian mountains was based on true events.

== Plot ==
Friedrich Mergel is the only son of Hermann Mergel, a violent alcoholic, and his second wife Margreth. He grows up in the village of B. ("Dorf B."), a small, isolated village in 18th century Westphalia, whose inhabitants work mostly as farmers, some of whom are involved in illegal logging. After his father's death, 12-year-old Friedrich is adopted by Simon Semmler, his mother's younger brother and her only surviving relative, who lives in the nearby village of Brede.

Over the years, Friedrich turns from a silent, pensive boy into an ostentatious young man. When a forester is killed with an axe after Friedrich deliberately sent him in the wrong direction, he is questioned by the authorities, but no charges are brought against him and the other townspeople. He later notices a missing axe in his uncle Simon's household, who gives a flimsy excuse when asked about it. At a village festivity, Friedrich tries to impress the bystanders with a silver watch, but is ridiculed when the Jew Aaron publicly declares that Friedrich still owes him the money for the watch. Shortly after, Aaron is found murdered, bludgeoned to death. Friedrich, the main suspect, flees the village with Johannes, Simon's workhand. The local Jewish community acquires the beech tree where Aaron's body was found, and marks it with the words

אם תעבור במקום תות יפגע בך כאשר אתה עשית לי

Half a year later, an arrested criminal confesses to having slain a person named Aaron in the woods, but it remains unclear if he refers to the Aaron killed near the beech tree.

28 years later, on 24 December 1788, a frail elderly man appears in Brede, claiming to be Johannes, who had escaped together with Friedrich. After both had enlisted in the Austrian army, Johannes was taken prisoner by the Turks and held as a slave, until he returned to Europe on a Dutch ship. Since Simon has long died, the man is taken in by a widow in the village and the local landlord sees to it that he is given new clothes and regular meals.

A few months later, the man disappears. His decomposed body is eventually found at the site of Aaron's murder, where he hanged himself from the beech tree. The landlord examines the corpse and, upon discovering a scar on the body, identifies him as the missing Friedrich Mergel, not Johannes. The novella closes with a translation of the Hebrew words carved into the tree: "If you approach this spot, what you did to me will happen to you."

== Background ==
Die Judenbuche is based on a true incident dating back to 1783, written down by Annette von Droste-Hülshoff's uncle, the agronomist and writer August von Haxthausen, and published in 1818. After killing the Jew Soestmann-Behrens, farmhand Hermann Georg Winkelhagen from Bellersen (referred to as "B." in the novella) fled the country to avoid arrest, was enslaved in Algeria and, after being freed in 1805, returned to his home town where he committed suicide.

Originally intended as part of an unrealised work on Westphalia by von Droste-Hülshoff, the novella was published separately in serialised form in the literary journal Morgenblatt für gebildete Stände, its title being suggested by editor Herrmann Hauff, who made the manuscript's original title Ein Sittengemälde aus dem gebirgigten Westphalen ("A portrayal of customs in mountainous Westphalia") its subtitle. The printed version was slightly shortened in one passage, either by Hauff or Levin Schücking, who had delivered the manuscript to the editor. Von Droste-Hülshoff was at first critical of the deletion, but later gave her assent. A possibly unauthorised reprint, again in serialised form, appeared in the same year in the Westfälischer Anzeiger.

While highly popular with contemporary readers, its reception among reviewers and fellow writers was initially rather mixed. A repeated subject of criticism were the story's ambiguities, which, as later comparisons of different drafts revealed, had been intentionally inserted by the author. One of the few to unreservedly praise von Droste-Hülshoff's work was Theodor Storm. In 1876, editor Paul Heyse, who had been critical of Die Judenbuche a few years earlier, included it in volume 24 of his novella anthology Deutscher Novellenschatz. This publication is now regarded as the beginning of the novella's rise to prominence.

== Translation ==
An early translation into English by Lillie Winter appeared in 1913, which took liberties such as omitting the introductory poem. A later translation was provided by Lionel and Doris Thomas in 1958.
