= Louise von Gall =

German bluestocking novelist and social critic

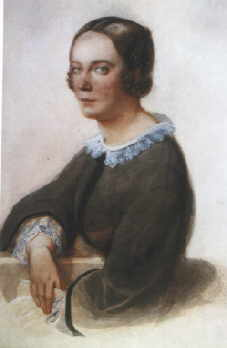
Louise von Gall

Louise von Gall (19 September 1815, Darmstadt – 16 March 1855, Augsburg) was a nineteenth-century German bluestocking novelist and social critic. Her two novels and other works went against the traditions of German literature, addressing the new problems created by the technological and economic developments of her times.

== Life ==
Johanna Udalrike Louise Gerhardine Freiin von Gall was the posthumous daughter of Hessian General Ludwig Friedrich Christian Wilhelm Philipp von Gall. Her mother, Friedrike (née von Müller), who had lost three brothers and her husband within a few years, raised Louise in Darmstadt. As an only child, Louise was the focus of her widowed mother's attention: "Ich war nun ihr Alles, ihr Einziges, Erstes und Letztes". She studied Byron and Shakespeare and was tutored in English, French and Italian; then at the age of fifteen boarded at a school in the Schenkendorfstraße in Mannheim.

With her mother, Louise von Gall made several trips to Vienna at the age of 25 to train in singing. She found she was not confident with larger audiences, but met an editor who published her first works under her pen name "Louis Leo". She was devastated by her mother's sudden death the following year. Shortly afterwards, she traveled through Hungary, a trip she later drew on for her novel Gegen den Strom.

On her return to Darmstadt, she became friends with Ida and Ferdinand Freiligrath, an established writer who was to go on to become a business partner of Karl Marx. They spent the summer of 1842 together in Sankt Goar, where the Freiligrath's circle included German writers and the American author Henry Wadsworth Longfellow. Many expected a romance to blossom between von Gall and Longfellow; while it did not, "he was tempted".

Freiligrath's next attempt at matchmaking was to suggest that she begin a correspondence with writer Levin Schücking. After nine months of an increasingly intense emotional and intellectual exchange, they finally met, and married only three months later.

Louise von Gall followed her husband at all stages of his eventful writer's life. They moved to Augsburg for him to become literary editor of the liberal Augsburger Allgemeine Zeitung, where she joined in the staff's debates and discussion.

The Shückings had five children together:

- Lothar, born on 19 December 1844, in Augsburg;
- Gerhardine, born 10 January 1846, in Cologne;
- Theophanie ("Theo"), born 19 April 1850;
- Adrian, born 13 July 1852; and
- Adolfine, born 19 September 1854, who died on 9 December 1854.

The Schückings moved to Cologne in 1848, where they developed a circle of literary and artistic friends. Von Gall's first play was performed in 1851, and both she and Schücking started to write their first novels.

In 1852 they bought a family property at Sassenberg in Warendorf, but Louise Schücking felt alien and unhappy there, as a Protestant in a strict and unintellectual Catholic environment. An attempt in the autumn of 1853 to settle again in Darmstadt failed; her last-born daughter died in infancy.

Louise Schücking died at the age of 40, and against her express wish she was buried in the Schücking family vault at Sassenberg. Her grave there is preserved in front of the church.

== Works ==
As Louise von Gall, Louise Schücking wrote two novels and several plays. Between 1840 and 1854 she wrote for magazines and almanacs.

Her works "drew attention to the injustice suffered by the greater part of the population, as a consequence of the unconcern of the rulers for the welfare of their subjects. She denounced the caste system from which she sprang, [and] did not shrink from making public her thoughts on matters of liberty and justice for all, including the rights of women".

Louise von Gall's publications include:

- Frauennovellen, 2 vols., Darmstadt: Jonghans, 1845
- Gegen den Strom. Roman, 2 vols., Bremen: Schlodtmann 1851

Against the Current. Set during the political turmoil in Austria and Hungary in 1848, this novel shows "her angry impatience with the political somnolence of her [German] compatriots' Almost without exception, the male characters are "vain, pompous, devious and tyrannical"; the heroine pronounces on the disadvantages suffered by women and the dangers of marriage: "Die Ehe ist ... das Grab der Liebe" - "Marriage is the grave of love".

- Der neue Kreuzritter. Roman, Berlin: A. Duncker, 1853

The New Crusader An idealistic baron proposes radical social reform. He suggests to the Pope that Europe's vast standing armies could be reduced, and that the states should instead fund housing health care and justice. Even rehabilitation of prisoners is proposed - all very radical ideas for the 1840s.

Von Gall wrote five stories for each of the two collections published jointly with Levi Schücking:

- Familienbilder, 2 vols., Prague: Kober, 1854
- Familien-Geschichten, 2 vols., Prague: Kober, 1854

In the year after von Gall's death, Levi Schücking published the dozen short stories she had been preparing as Frauenleben; Novellen und Erzählungen. The substance of each is the relationship between women from aristocratic or privileged backgrounds and their male counterparts, their insistence on thinking and judging for themselves, and their hope and right of participation in personal and social encounters.

== Bibliography ==
- Chisholm, Hugh, ed. (1911). "Schücking, Levin" . Encyclopædia Britannica (11th ed.). Cambridge University Press.
- Gilman, D. C.; Peck, H. T.; Colby, F. M., eds. (1905). "Schücking, Levin" . New International Encyclopedia (1st ed.). New York: Dodd, Mead.
- Powell, Hugh (1993). Louise Von Gall: Her World and her Work. Boydell & Brewer. ISBN 978-1-879751-55-2.
