= List of paintings by the Master of Meßkirch =

Works by a German painter of the 16th century

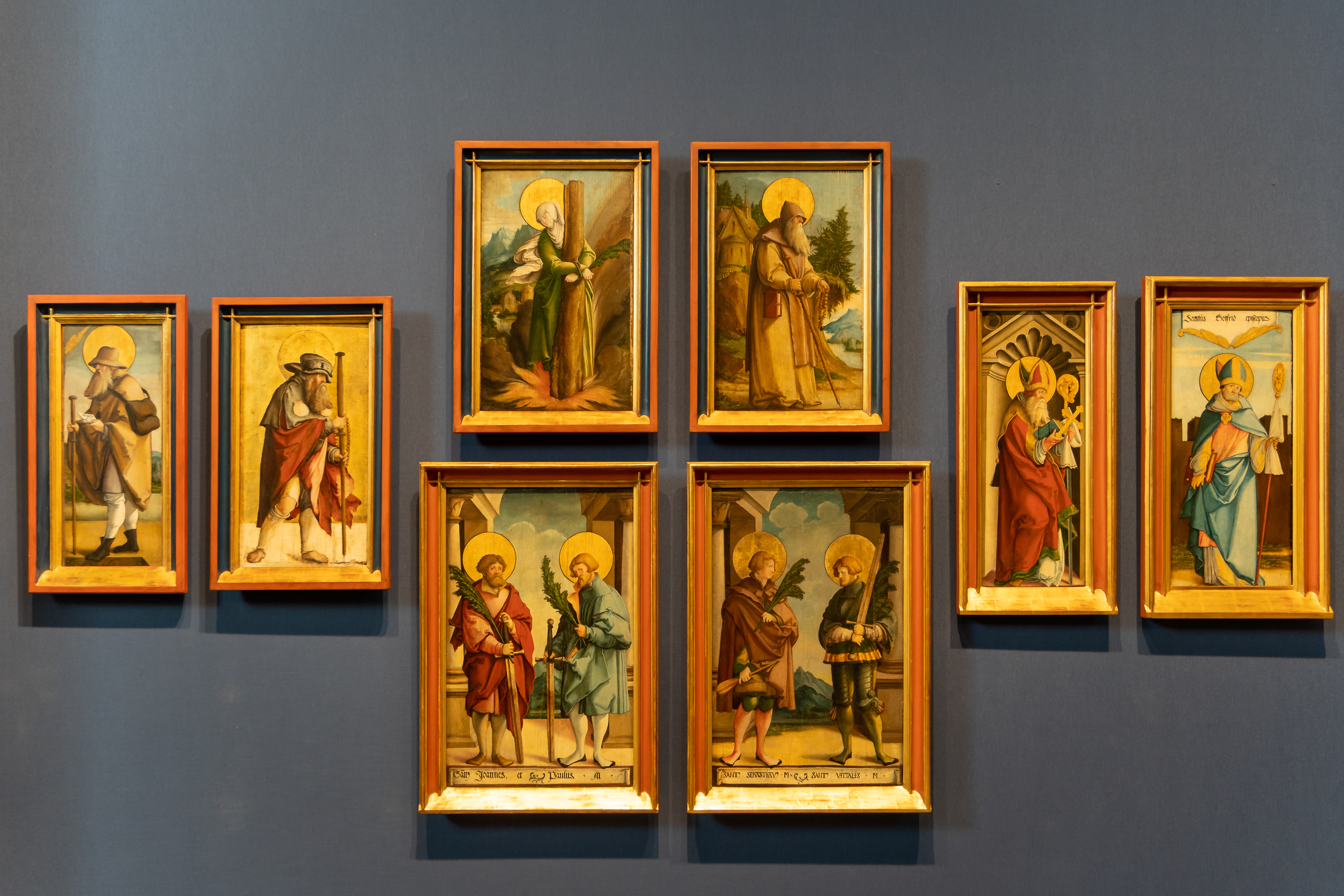
Panel painting by the Master of Meßkirch in the Johanniterkirche in Schwäbisch Hall (Würth Collection)

This is a list of all the known works of an anonymous Renaissance artist from southern Germany, known provisionally as the Master of Meßkirch. It is based on the catalogue raisonné compiled in 1933 by art historian Heinrich Feurstein and the catalogue for the major state exhibition Der Meister von Meßkirch. Katholische Pracht in der Reformationszeit, which ran from 8 December 2017 to 2 April 2018 in Stuttgart.

== History of the Œuvre ==
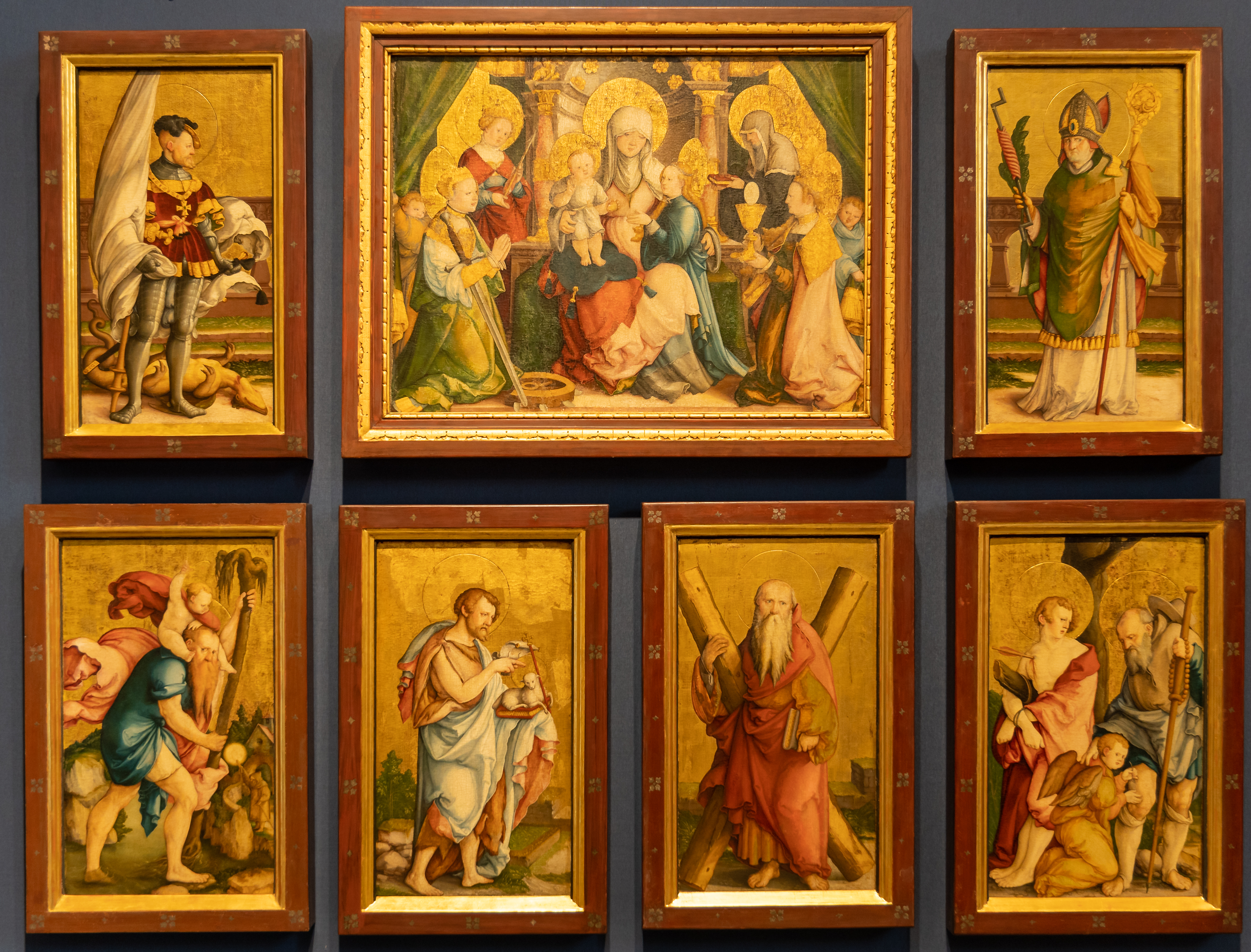
Falkenstein Altar, house altar from the Oberfalkenstein Chapel

The Master of Meßkirch was an artist who was mainly active in the Upper Danube region in the first half of the 16th century. His main work was commissioned by the Counts of Zimmern, who resided in Meßkirch. Through inheritance and Joseph von Laßberg's special relationship with the House of Fürstenberg, significant parts of the work reached the Princely Fürstenberg Collections. The first systematic catalogue of works was therefore compiled by one of its later directors, Heinrich Feurstein.

In addition to the house altars that initially remained in family ownership – such as the Sigmaringen Marian panels, the Falkenstein Altar, the Sigmaringen House Altar and the Wildenstein Altar, as well as several portraits and epitaphs attributed to him and the secco paintings in the Heiligkreuztal Monastery – the master's preserved magnum opus is the altar furnishings for St. Martin's Church in Meßkirch. This altarpiece was created between 1535 and 1540 by him and, as evidenced by the varying quality of the workmanship, by his workshop assistants. Based on the surviving central panels, the assignment of individual saints to specific altar foundations and the architectural conditions, there were up to twelve altars, each with a central panel, two wings painted on both sides and two standing wings, i.e. 12 central pieces and 72 wing paintings.

Last Supper Retable (St. Martin Church in Meßkirch) closed open	Temptation Retable (St. Martin Church in Meßkirch) closed open	Wildensteiner Altar (House Altar, likely Meßkirch Castle) closed open Sigmaringen Small House Altar (Anna of Zimmern): carved figurine group

=== The path of the œuvre in collections and museums ===
With a few exceptions – the frescoes in Heiligkreuztal, which are no longer in very good condition, the portrait of Eitel Friedrich III of Zollern (1561), the Sigmaringen house altarpiece and the central panel of the Three Kings altar – the works are no longer in their original contexts but scattered across museums and collections on two continents.

Early Romantic authors such as Friedrich Schlegel, Wilhelm Heinrich Wackenroder and Ludwig Tieck had called for a rediscovery of medieval panel painting. As a result of secularisation, but also of mediatisation and the resulting reorganisation of church administration (in the area under consideration here: dissolution of the diocese of Constance, re-establishment of the dioceses of Freiburg and Rottenburg), church property had come under new and uncertain ownership, not only in monasteries and foundations, but also in town and village churches. Private collectors were given the opportunity to acquire such cultural assets. Although today the loss of cultural assets during that period is often lamented, this meant that works of art from the late Middle Ages and early modern period, which were frowned upon in the age of Baroque and early Classicism, could be both materially saved and aesthetically rehabilitated, as they were no longer in their original locations due to this change in style, but were often stored or used for purposes other than their original ones.

For the works by the Master of Meßkirch, there were two main collectors: Joseph von Laßberg and Johann Baptist von Hirscher.

Laßberg's scholarly interest stemmed from the nascent fields of not only German studies, but also art history as a science, which was influenced by the Romantic aesthetics mentioned above. He conducted many years of research in which he sought to prove that the Holbein family originated in Upper Swabia, including Holbein's alleged stay with the Counts of Zimmern. Throughout his life, he attributed the works of the Master of Meßkirch that he found to Hans Holbein.

In addition to this Holbein research, the panel paintings were objects of exchange for Laßberg, who used them to acquire manuscripts, such as the St. Gallen Temptation and Last Supper altarpieces, which he exchanged with Bishop Carl Johann Greith from his library in the 1850s. Or they were gifts and exchanges between friends and relatives, such as Saint Werner for Werner von Haxthausen.

Johann Baptist von Hirscher was a theologian; his writings contain no thoughts on art history topics. And yet the 250 paintings and carvings that can be reconstructed from the records of sales from his collection are one of the most complete ensembles of late medieval art ever assembled by a private collector in southern Germany.

==== Hirscher Collection ====
From the Hirscher Collection
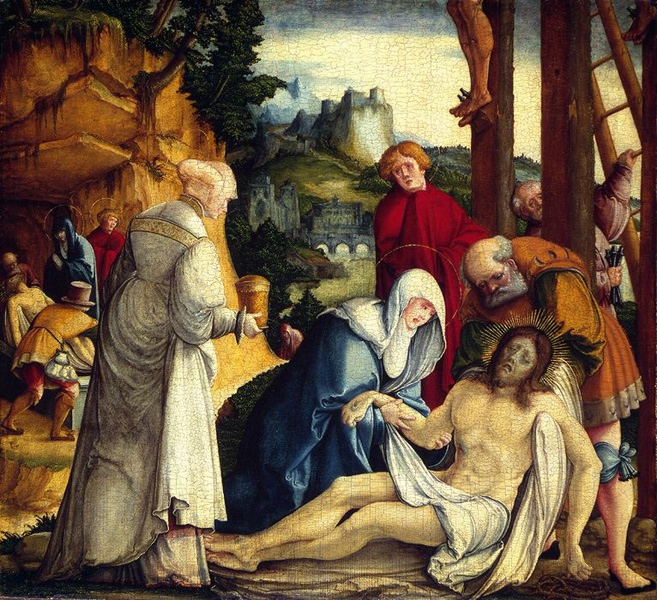
M1. The Lamentation and Entombment of Christ

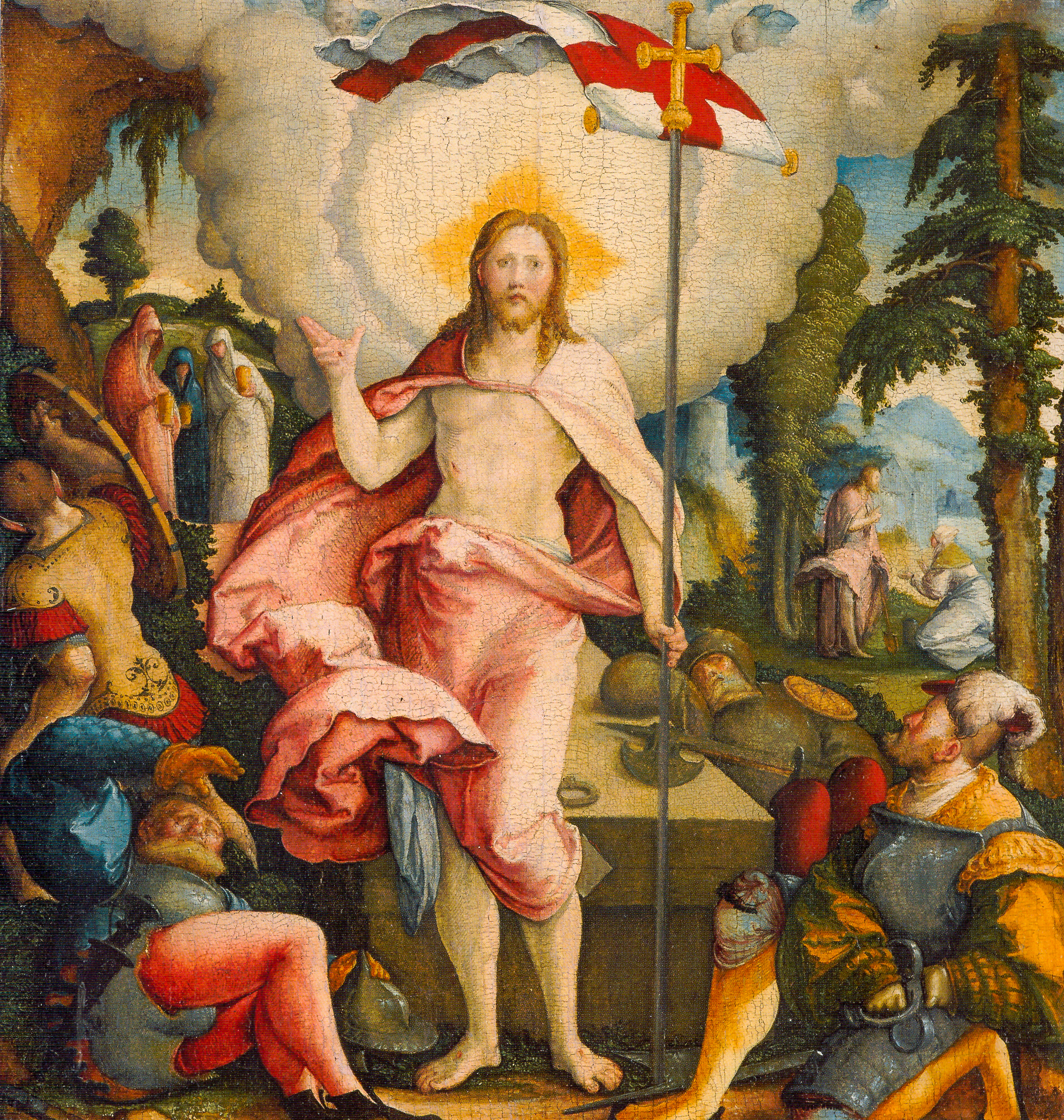
M2. The Resurrection of Christ and Noli me tangere

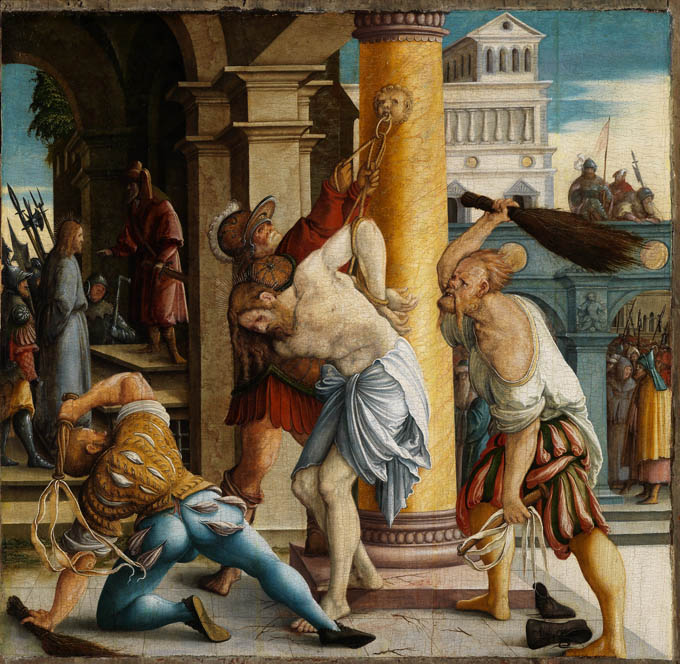
M3. The Flagellation of Christ and Christ before Pilate
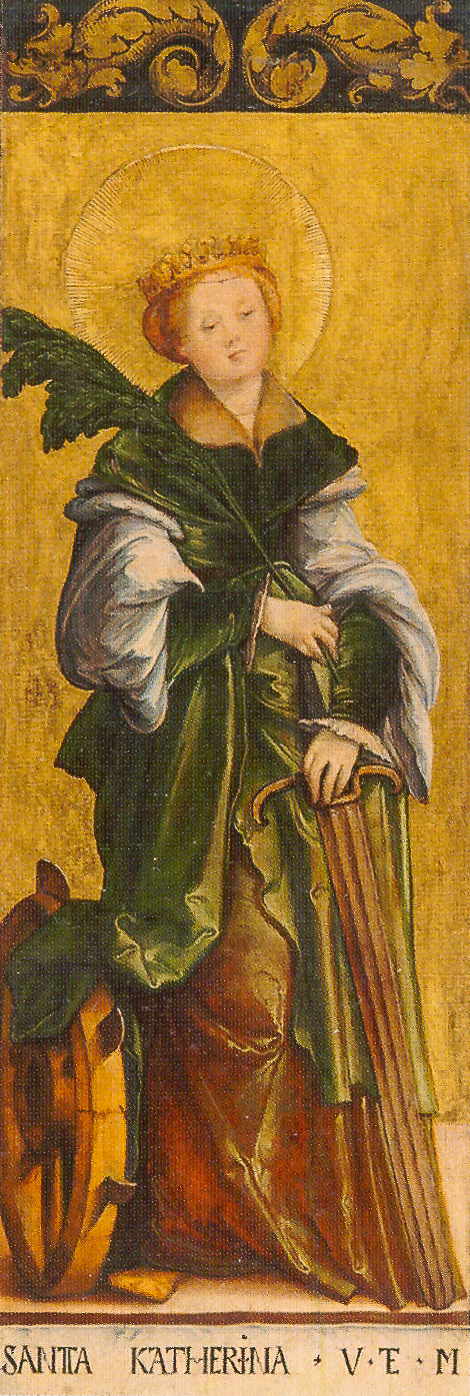
1. Saint Catherine
(left rotating wing, inside)

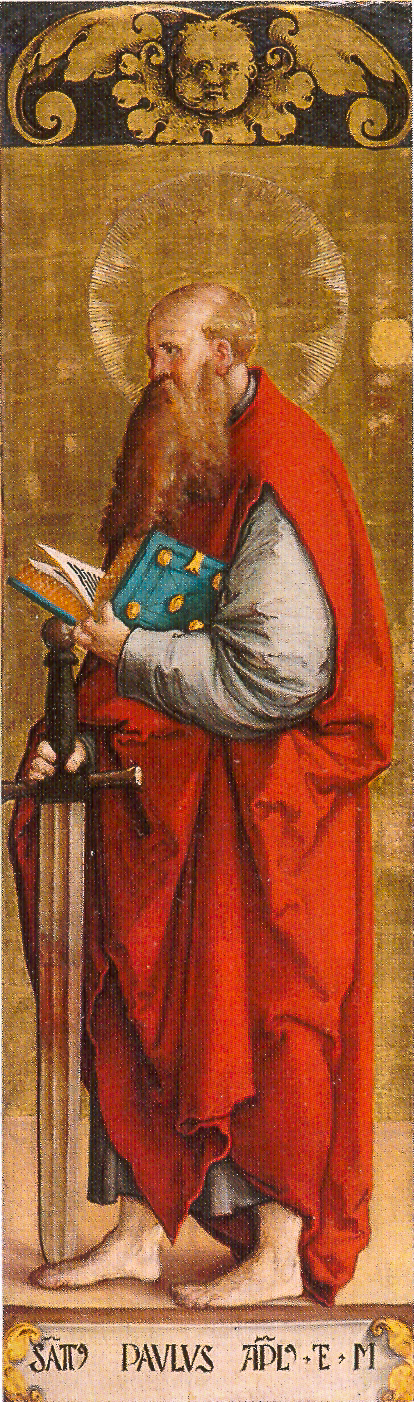
2. Saint Paul
(right rotating wing, inside)

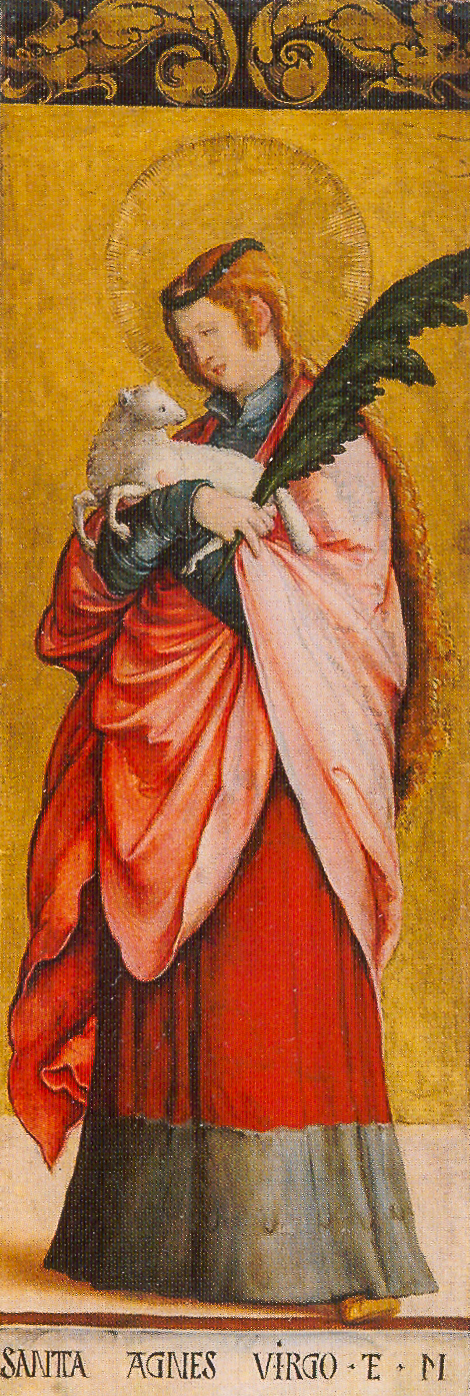
3. Saint Agnes
(right rotating wing, inside)
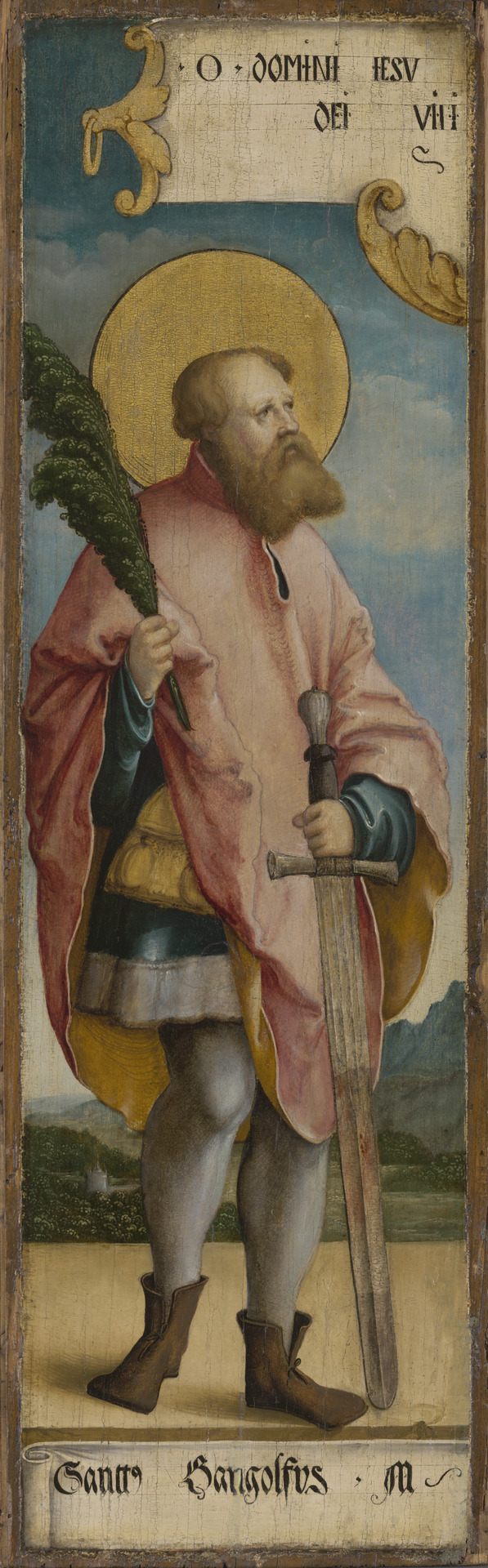
4. Saint Gangolf
(left rotating wing, outside)

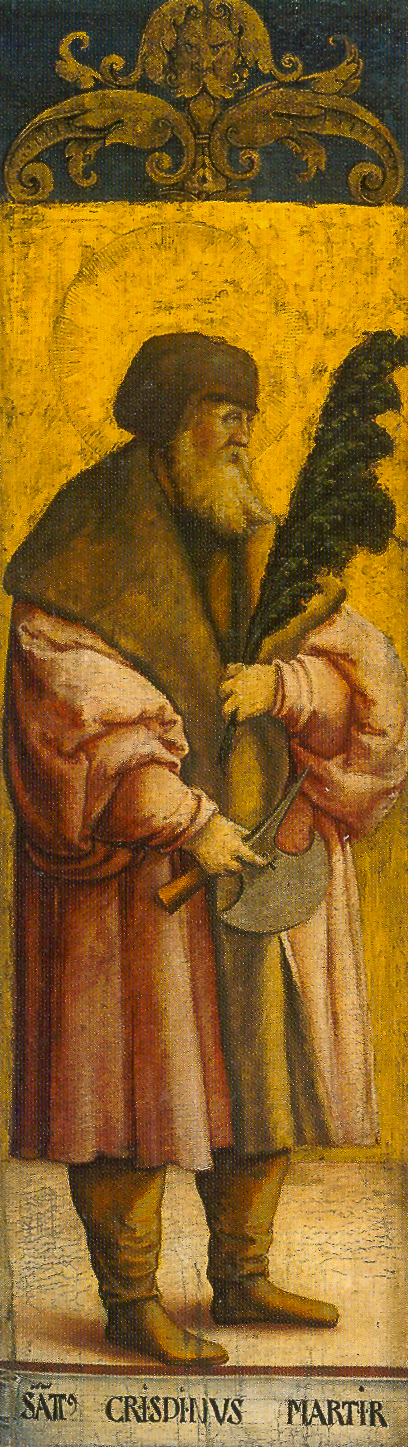
Saint Crispin
(left rotating wing, inside)

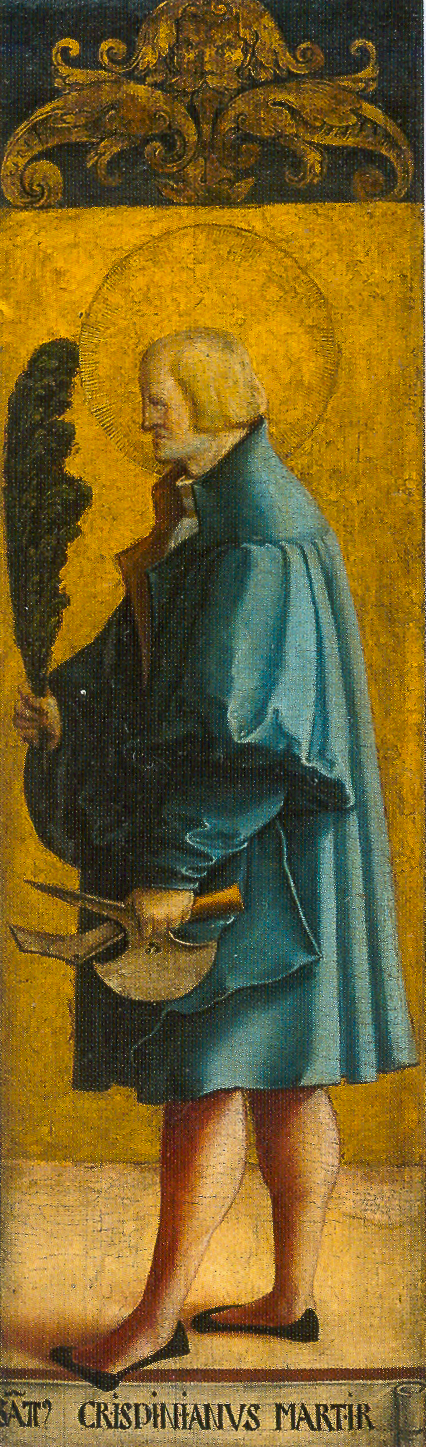
5. Saint Crispinian
(right rotating wing, inside)

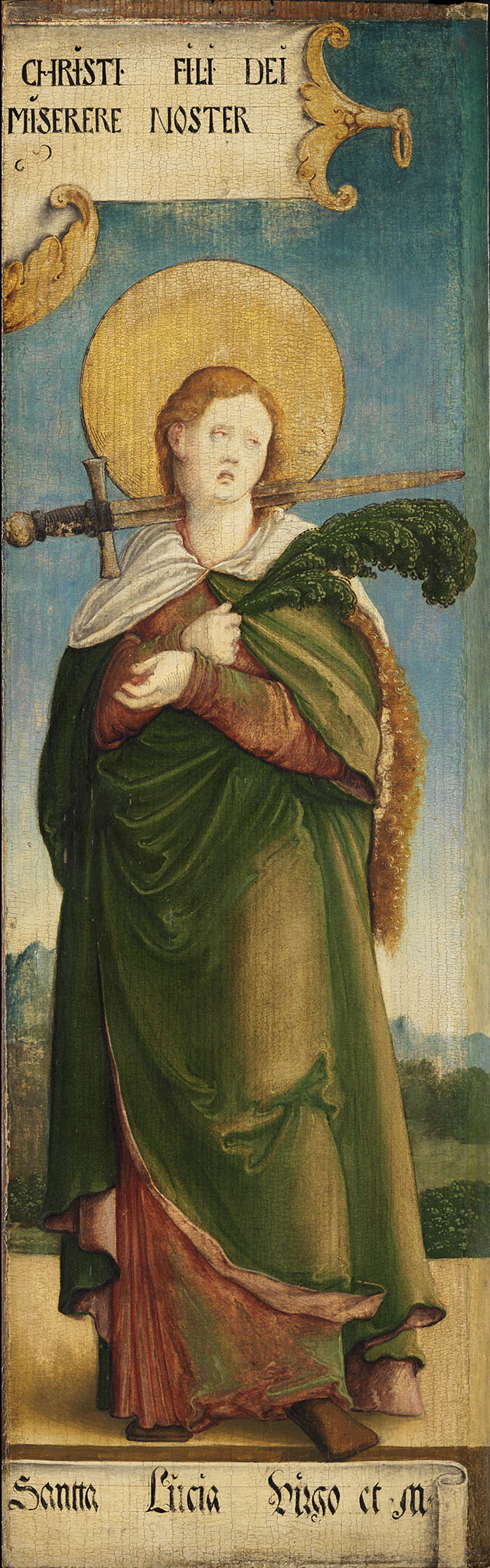
Saint Lucy
(right rotating wing, outside)

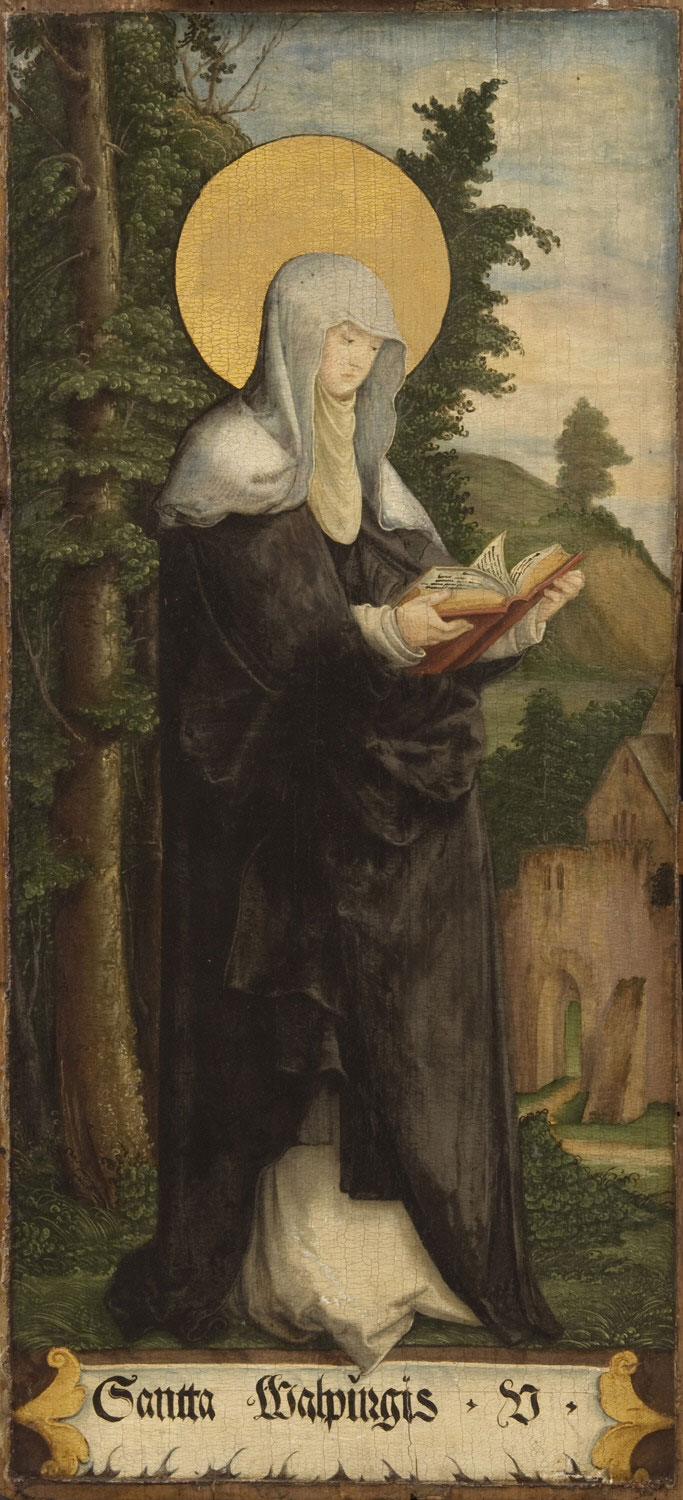
6. Saint Walburga
(left fixed wing, pendant to Saint Eulalia)

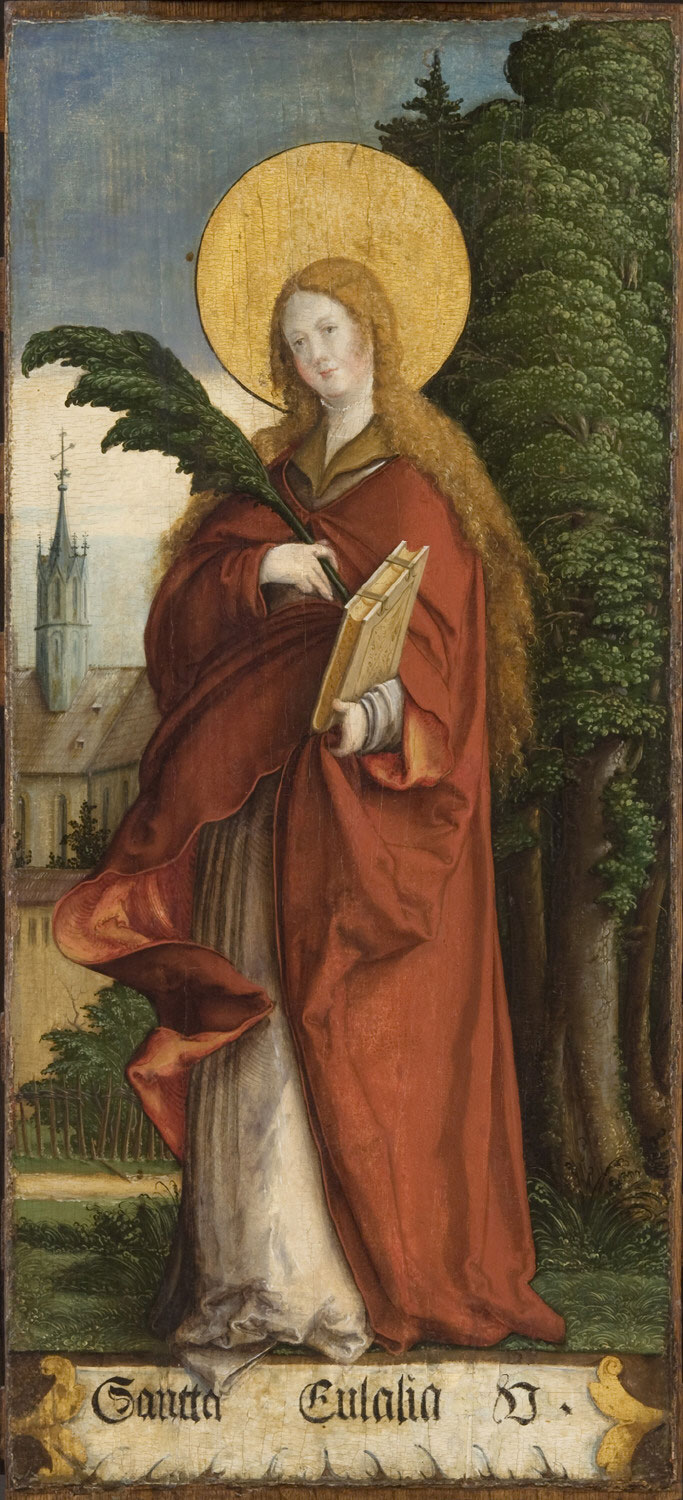
7. Saint Eulalia
(right fixed wing, pendant to Saint Walburga)
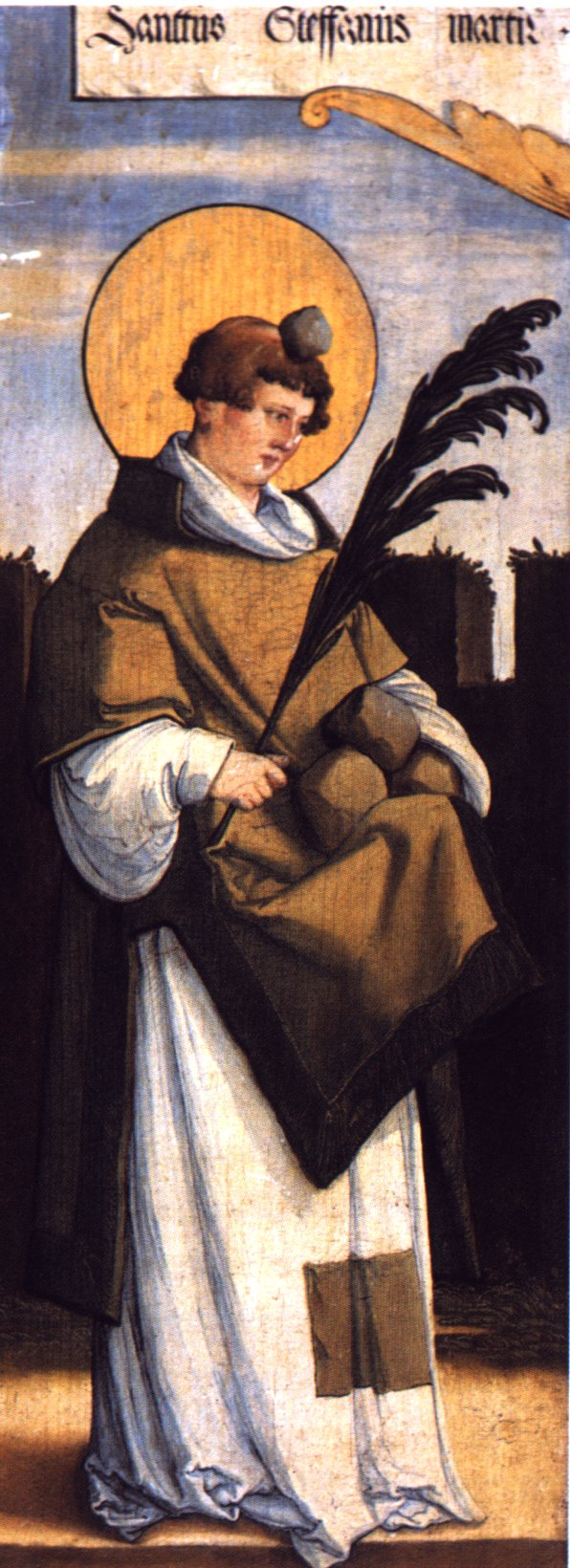
8. Saint Stephen
(left rotating wing, outside)

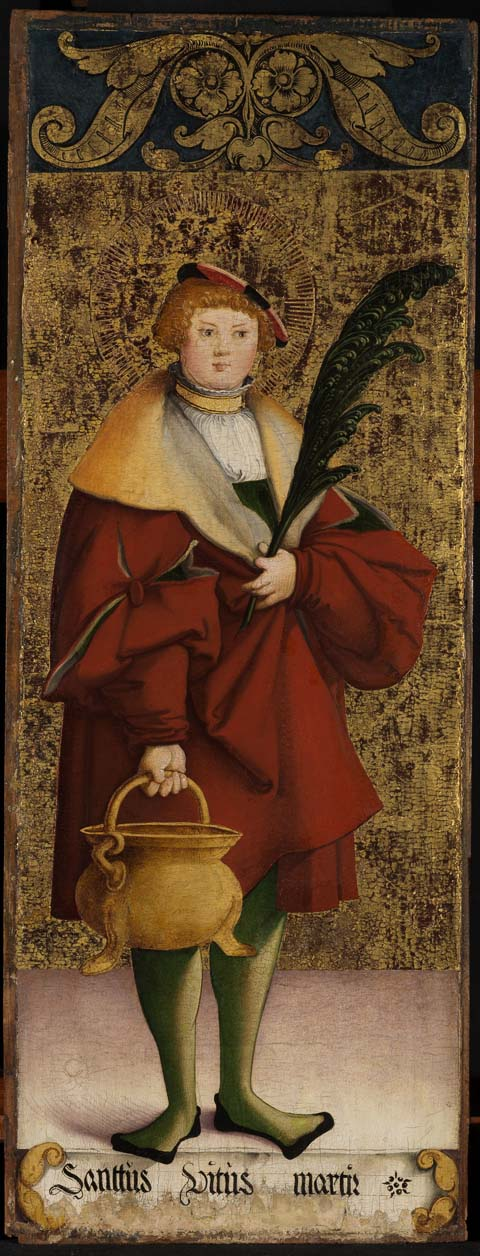
Saint Vitus
(left rotating wing, inside)

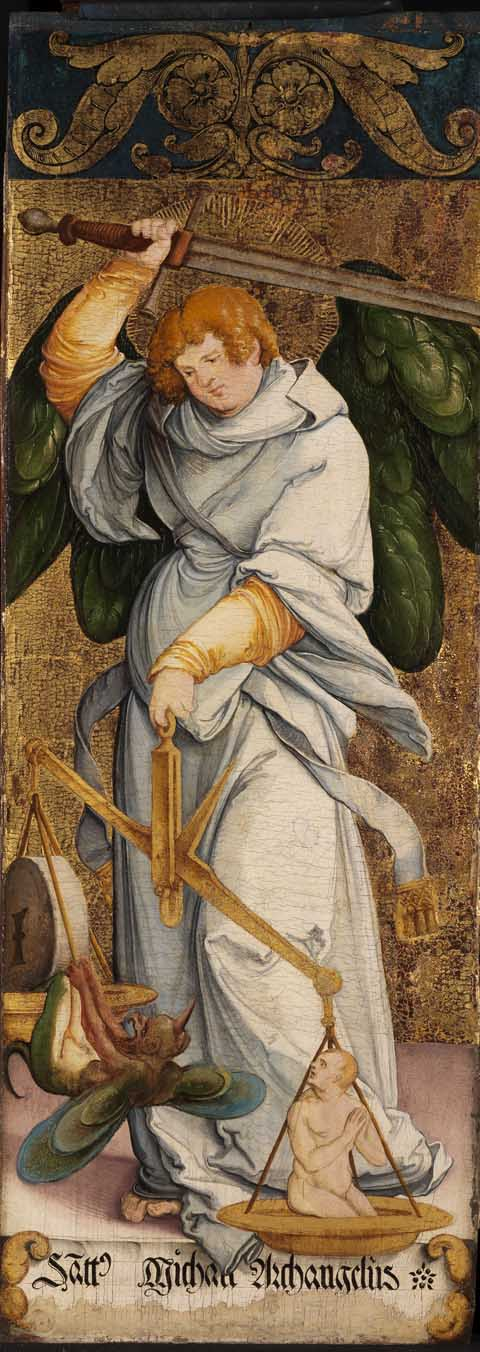
9. Archangel Michael as Weigher of Souls
(right rotating wing, inside)

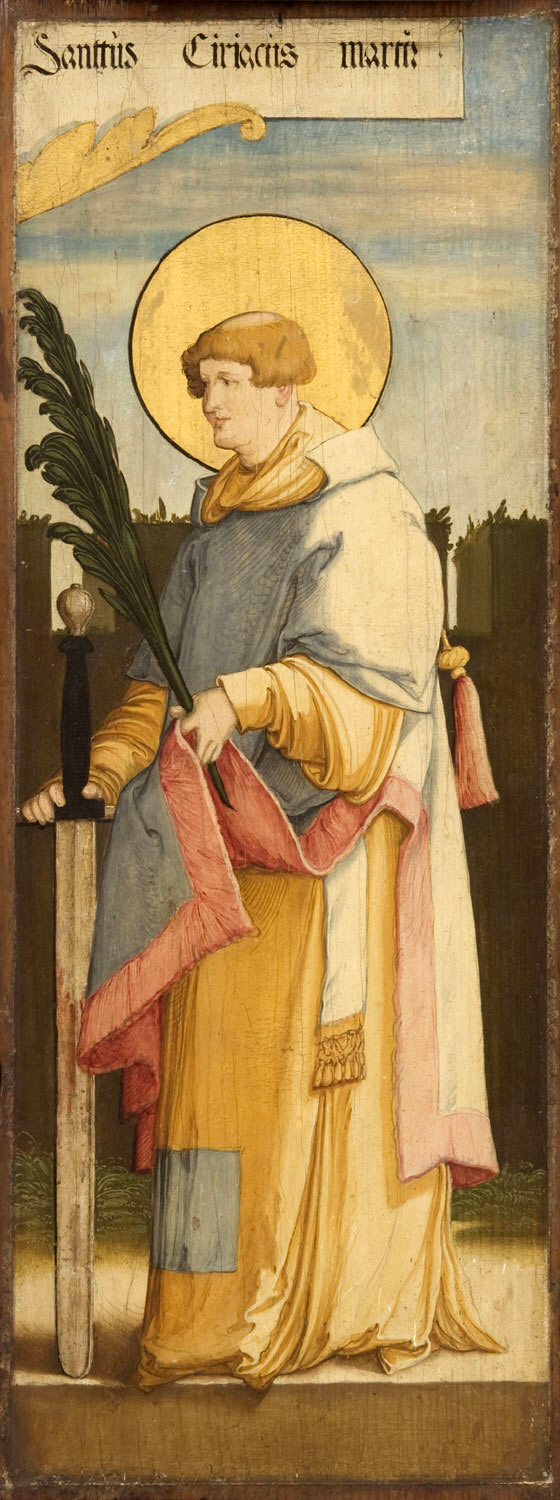
Saint Cyriacus
(right rotating wing, outside)

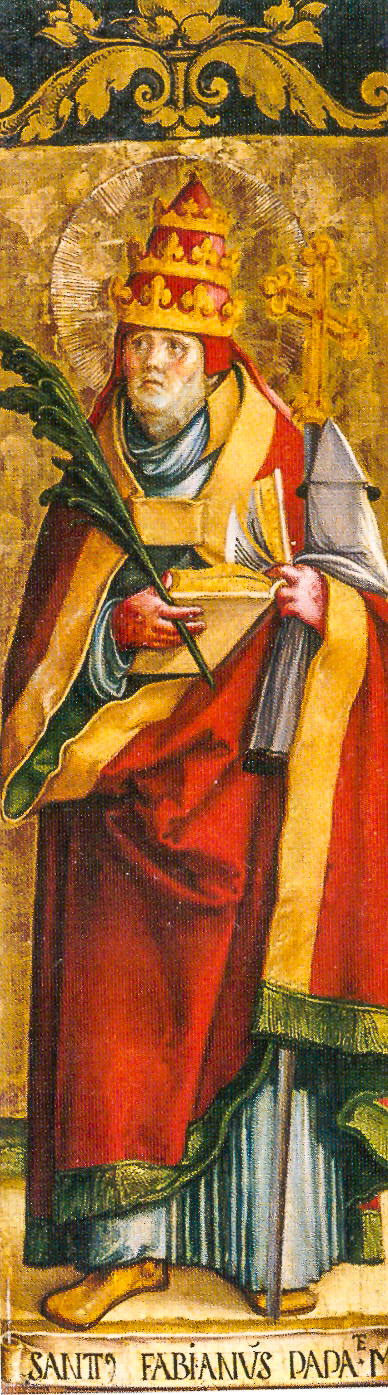
10. Saint Fabian
(inside, right)
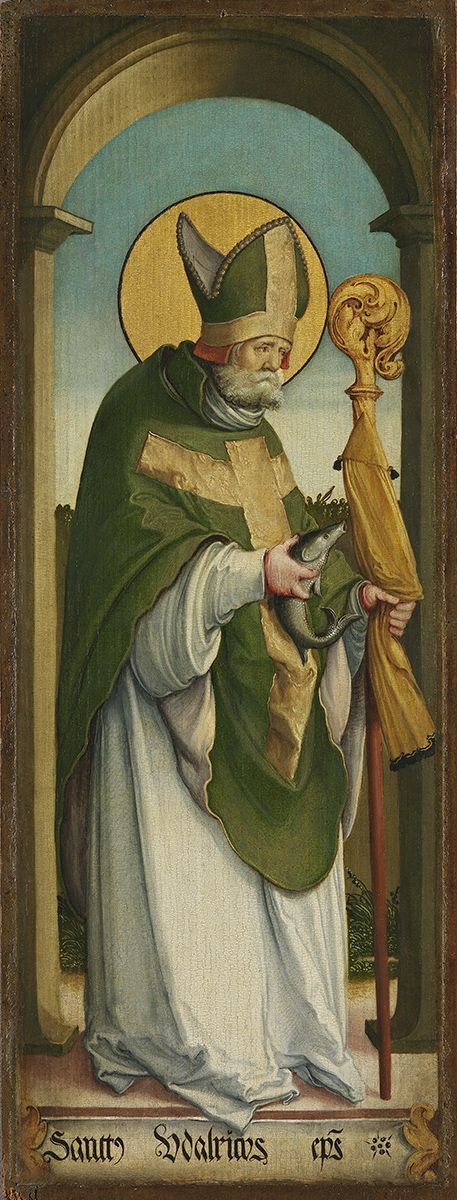
11. Saint Ulrich
(left fixed wing)

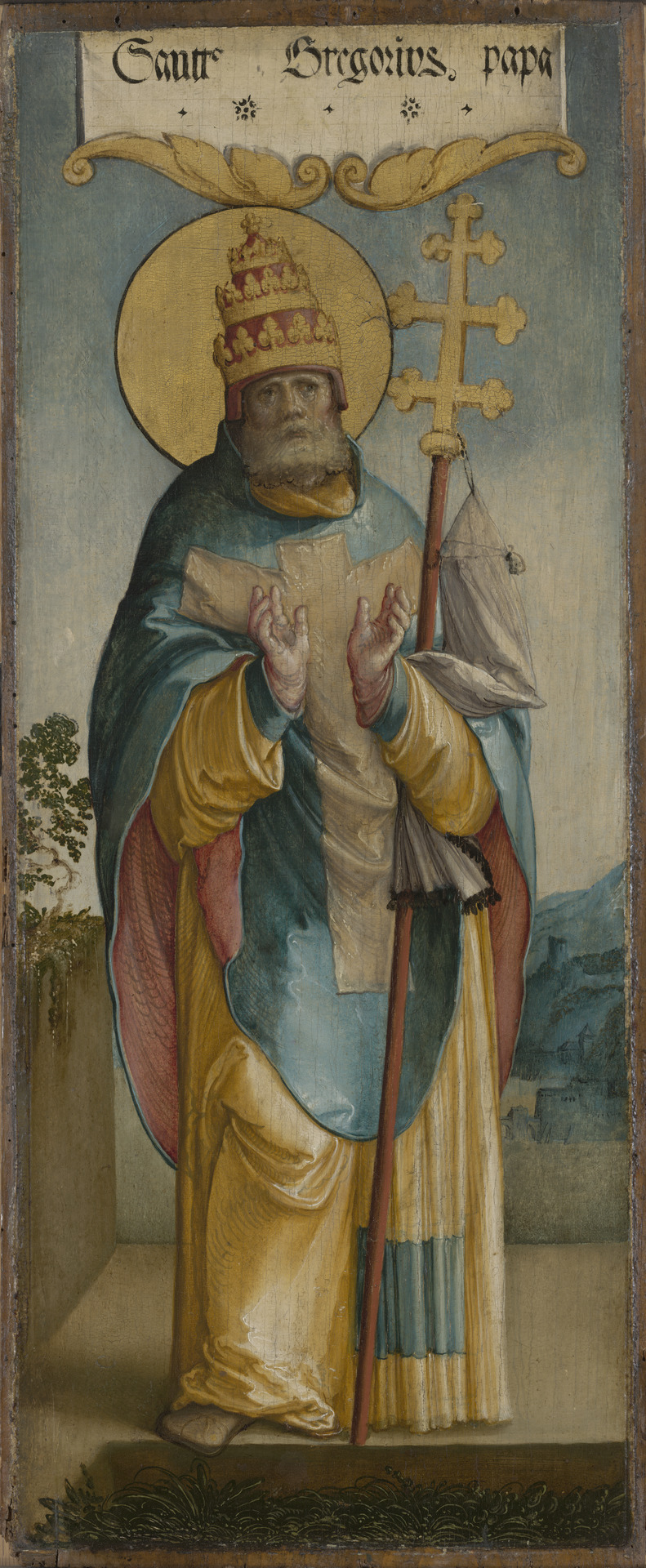
12. Saint Gregory
(left fixed wing)

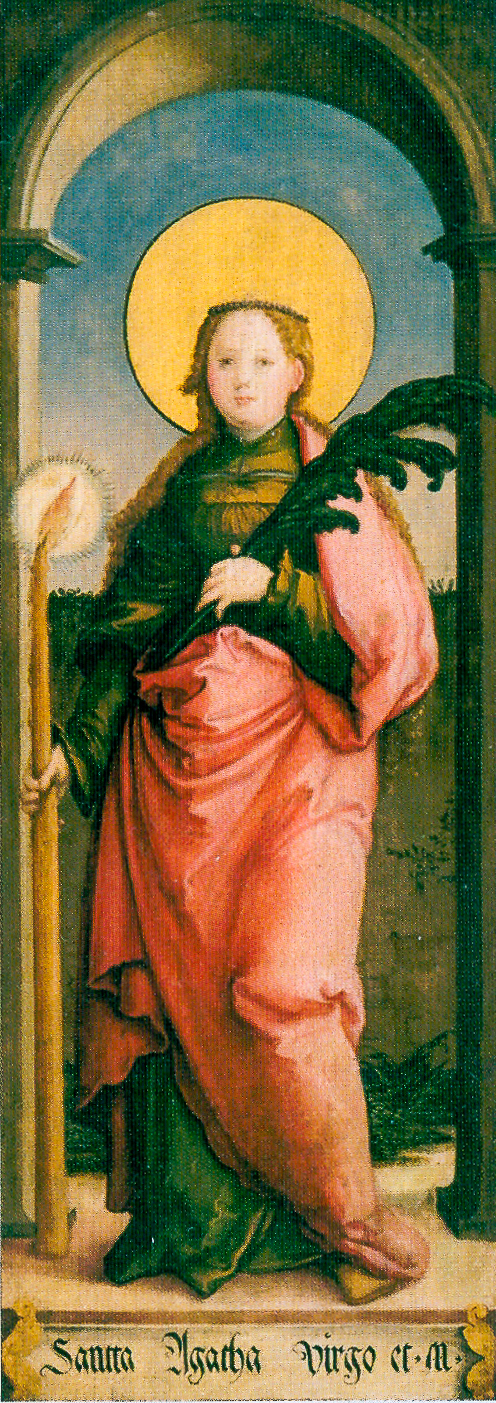
13. Saint Agatha
(right fixed wing)
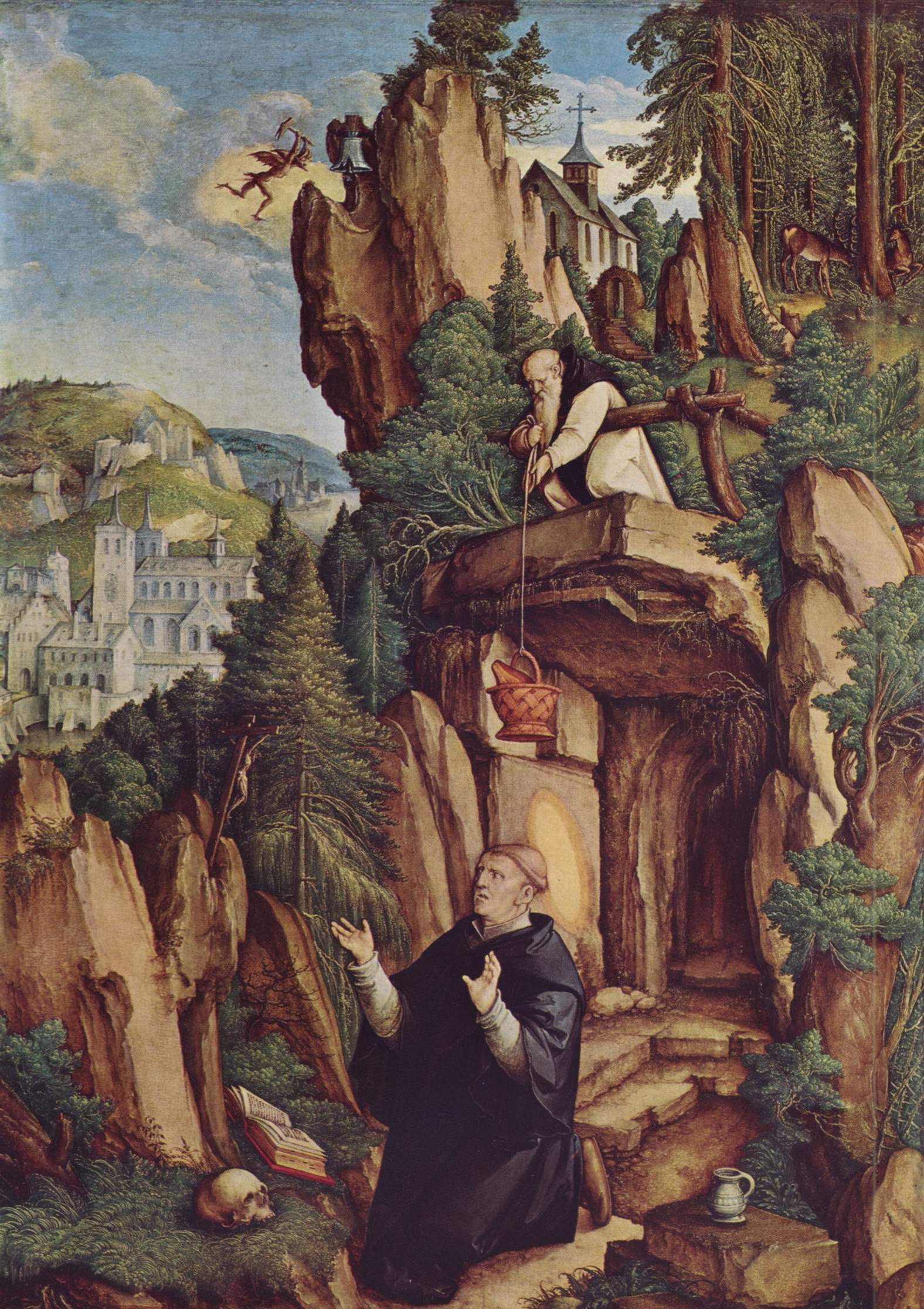
S1. Saint Benedict in Prayer

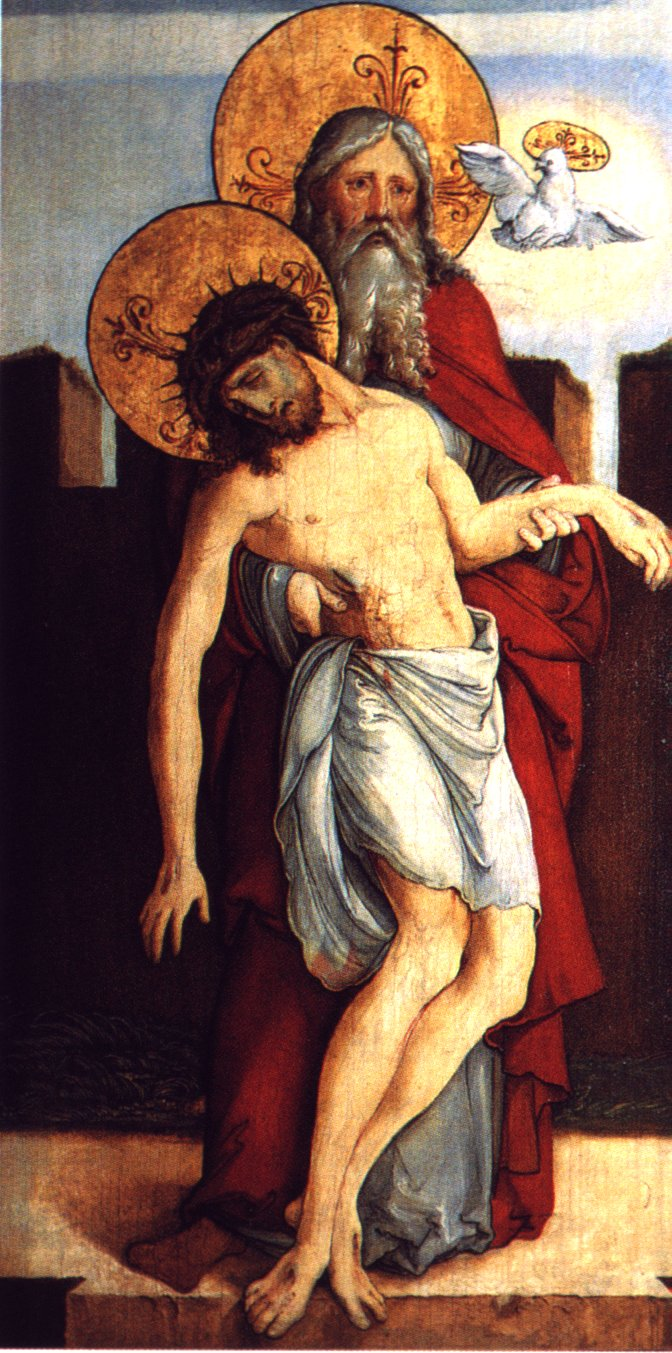
D1. The Holy Trinity

Hirscher first became involved in collecting artworks when he visited the gallery of Prince Ludwig zu Oettingen-Wallerstein in 1816. He immediately began collecting medieval art and made Wallerstein an offer in 1821, which Wallerstein declined. However, the offer allows us to reconstruct which works by the Master of Meßkirch were already in Hirscher's possession at that time.

- Von Hans Holbein - eine Grablegung 2 × 2 1/2 Schuhe";
- Von demselben - eine Auferstehung Christi 2 1/4 × 2 Schuhe";
- Von demselben - 15 Stücke, z.T. doppelt bemalt, und einzelne Heilige vorstellend. Es befindet sich auf je einer Seite ein Heiliger. Einige haben Goldgrund 2 × 3/8-4/8 Schuhe";
- Außer der inneren Glaubwürdigkeit haben diese Bilder sämtlich das Zeugnis des Freiherrn von Laßberg (Herausgeber der Sammlung altdeutscher Gedichte) für sich, welcher von einer anderen Seite her einen Teil dieser ehemals zusammengehörigen Bilder erworben und versichert hat, daß er es urkundlich habe, daß dieselben von dem Basler Holbein seien [...]";

The panels do not appear to have been split at this point. Four reverse sides also appear to have been lost. As his later sales show, he owned other works by the Master of Meßkirch in addition to this offering, which he only put up for sale later. Hirscher never disclosed where his artworks came from or from whom he had acquired them. The fact that he was not purely interested in making money is clear from the fact that he usually sold his collection en bloc to established art collectors or institutions.

The first of these sales was to the Stuttgart art collector Carl Gustav Abel in 1834. On 26 July, he purchased 61 paintings for 2,100 guilders.

In a list compiled by Franz Kugler for the Abel Collection in 1837, the following works, which can be attributed to the Master of Meßkirch, are noted:

Hans Holbein the Elder

From a church in Messkirch (Note: These panels are more likely to correspond to the rotating wings of the high altarpiece of St. Martin WD, that is, to the Laßberg collection. It seems plausible that the separation of panel paintings was carried out by only a few workshops, and that in this case Laßberg had relied on Abel as an intermediary, giving Abel temporary access to the works in the meantime.)

- Mary Magdalene
- John the Baptist
- St. Martin
- St. Wernher
- Beham (?)

From a church in Messkirch

- Four paintings depicting martyrs

Additionally

from Constance

Votive tablet of the von Bubenhofen family (Sic dilexit Deus mundum)

In 1850, a sale of further parts of the Hirscher Collection to the Painting Gallery of the Royal Prussian Museum in Berlin, initiated by Gustav Friedrich Waagen, was completed. These included five front panels by the Master of Meßkirch, which were now presented in a new mounting.

The Master of Meßkirch created the festive pages Saint Vitus and Archangel Michael weighing souls (inside pages 8 and 9) as well as Saint Lucia (outside page 5) and the central panel M3 (Flagellation of Christ and Christ before Pilate).

A year before his death, Hirscher approached the Württemberg government, offering 47 paintings and 12 sculptures, which he wanted to see become part of the Staatsgalerie Stuttgart. The purchase agreement was concluded on 29 August 1865, just five days before his death. Of the works by the Master of Meßkirch, Saint Benedict in Prayer (S1) found its way into the collection. Another painting, which belongs to a larger ensemble of related panels that was part of Hirscher's collection, is now part of the Diocesan Museum in Rottenburg. The Holy Trinity (D1) came to the museum with the Dursch Collection of Georg Martin Dursch when this collection was purchased. Dursch was a student of Hirscher and was inspired by him to collect late Gothic wooden sculptures and panel paintings. Feurstein suspects that it also originally came from Hirscher's collection.

==== Joseph von Laßberg as a collector ====
Today, Laßberg is primarily remembered as a collector of manuscripts and books. But he also unreservedly expressed his love for the Middle Ages in his own life, for example in his Blue Room at Eppishausen Castle.

The painted glass panes with old coats of arms and pictures; the round table in the middle of the room covered with an antique inkwell and old books and tools; German wood paintings hanging on the walls; old rifles and weapons placed in the corners; cabinets decorated with beautiful inlaid work; a large bowl filled with Turkish tobacco and a number of differently shaped tobacco pipes; even the jugs, bottles, glasses and plates on the table – everything made a surprising impression on the observer.

He responded to the trauma of the French Revolution, the ensuing territorial upheavals and the destruction of the old imperial order with a call to collect. He endeavoured to preserve cultural assets that were at risk of loss and dispersion due to the changes of his time and the destruction of the old order. In 1820, he wrote to a fellow collector, Friedrich Carl von und zu Brenken: "Let us, each in our own place, collect and preserve what we can salvage from the flood of time." And he wrote to his friend Johann Adam Pupikofer: "I have collected as much as I could. Now you, my young friend, must also set to work with vigour for the same purpose! Focus your attention most keenly on that which is close to destruction and, abandoned to an uncertain fate, needs to be saved so that it does not disappear without a trace!"

According to a letter from 1850 to his friend Carl Johann Greith, later the Bishop of St. Gallen, Laßberg acquired the altarpiece wings from the church wardens of Meßkirch in 1817 or 1818.

However, there is only evidence of a purchase for the years 1821/22. Christian Altgraf zu Salm therefore attributed Laßberg's 1950 dissertation on the Master of Meßkirch to an age-related memory lapse. Since Hirscher, like Laßberg, already owned works by the Master of Meßkirch before 1821, it can be assumed that Laßberg purchased works from Meßkirch on several occasions. As it is not known which works he purchased and when, publications usually give both dates, "1817/18" and "1821/22".

Laßberg had supported Elisabeth zu Fürstenberg during the mediatisation of the principality and during the guardianship of her son Karl Egon, and she in turn supported him in his collecting activities. Laßberg also appears to have had considerable freedom in dealing with the paintings belonging to the Fürstenberg family. It is unclear how, during the restoration of the Falkenstein Altar under the direction of the Boisserée brothers in Munich in 1838, the paintings on the left wing (St. George and St. John the Baptist) came into the possession of Werner von Haxthausen, his friend, chain brother and uncle of his second wife Jenny von Droste zu Hülshoff.

From 1842 onwards, he negotiated with the House of Fürstenberg regarding the sale of his collections (books and paintings), but the sale did not take place until 1852, at 27,000 guilders. Some of his paintings also entered the art market via his daughters' family estates.

==== Whereabouts of the works ====
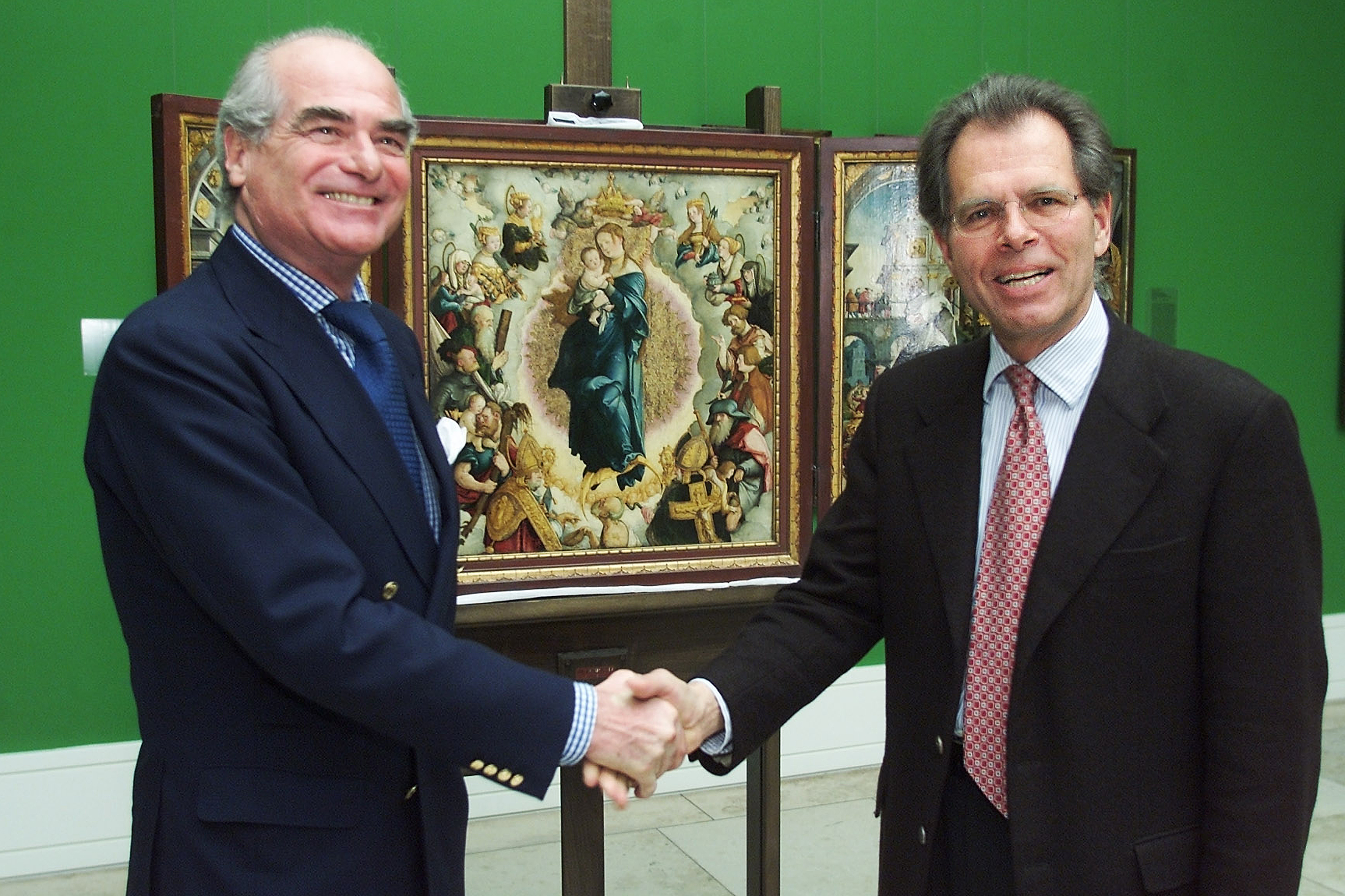
The former director of the Staatsgalerie Stuttgart, Christian von Holst, and Heinrich Fürst zu Fürstenberg in 2002, at the handover of the Wildenstein Altar on loan.

Many of the works by the Master of Meßkirch found their way into larger museums. The works from the Laßberg Collection initially went to the Fürstlich Fürstenbergische Sammlungen, while the works from the Hirscher Collection were acquired by the Kaiser Friedrich Museum in Berlin and the Großherzogliche Gemäldegalerie Karlsruhe. Although the Staatsgalerie Stuttgart also acquired works from the Hirscher Collection, none were by the Master of Meßkirch. The reason for this lies in the acquisition policy of these collections at the time. In Karlsruhe, Grand Duke Friedrich I of Baden commissioned Ludwig des Coudres, a history and portrait painter as well as professor and teacher of antiquities and painting at the Karlsruhe Art School, and Carl Ludwig Frommel, director of the Grand Ducal Picture Gallery, as a second expert to evaluate the works of art. Neither of them considered the collection worthy of a gallery. Of Hirscher's offerings, which by today's standards included illustrious names, only five paintings were deemed excellent, 27 good, 34 'respectable middle class' and 11 'almost worthless'.

It is therefore hardly surprising that the works of the Master of Meßkirch, whom these academic painters were unable to classify, ended up in the private art trade via the heirs of Hirschers and Abels, such as the split outer sides of the revolving wings of the side altarpiece, which can now only be reconstructed. They were sold in 1863 via Lempertz to George Gillis Haanen in Cologne, auctioned on 9 November 1909 with the collection of Édouard Louis François Fétis at Le Roy Frères in Brussels, and came via Frederik Muller, Amsterdam, to John G. Johnson, who bequeathed them with his collection to the Philadelphia Museum of Art in 1917.

Works that Laßberg did not sell to the Fürstenberg Collection, such as the two standing wings 'Saint Cosmas' and 'A Holy Deacon', went to Baroness Carla Droste zu Hülshoff as heiress and were last recorded in 1934 at the Galarie Caspari in Munich. They have been considered lost ever since.

The detached outer section of the left wing of the former high altarpiece 'Saint Werner', which Laßberg exchanged with Werner von Haxthausen around 1836 for a Holy Family by Jan van Hemessen, came into the possession of Hermann von und zu Brenken through his heirs, then to Richard von Kaufmann and, via auction, to Walter von Pannwitz. After his death, the panel was taken by his widow to Hartekamp Castle in the Netherlands. In January 1941, the work was sold to Hermann Göring through the art dealer Walter Andreas Hofer. Via the Munich Central Collecting Point, it was restituted to the State Collection of the Rijksdienst voor het Cultureel Erfgoed and is now on display at the Bonnefantenmuseum in Maastricht.

After the House of Fürstenberg had already parted with its old library collection in the 1990s, it began to sell off its collection of Old Master paintings in the early 2000s. Industrialist Reinhold Würth acquired the majority of the collection for a sum in the tens of millions, with the exception of the works that were already on permanent loan to the Staatliche Kunsthalle in Karlsruhe and the Staatsgalerie in Stuttgart.

The panels of the main altarpiece that remained in the Fürstenberg Collection were brought to Karlsruhe; the fourth panel is in the Netherlands as a protected national cultural asset, as mentioned above. The two side panels had entered the Paris art market early on as works by Albrecht Dürer and were acquired by Franz von Rinecker in 1869. Today, they are part of the Bavarian State Painting Collections and in the State Gallery of Old German Masters in Augsburg. Only the central panel, 'The Adoration of the Magi', remains in its original location, the parish church of St. Martin in Meßkirch, now as a side altar.

The Wildenstein Altarpiece, which had been on loan to the Staatsgalerie Stuttgart since 2002, was finally acquired in 2012 with the support of the Kulturstiftung der Länder (Cultural Foundation of the German States) and the Ernst von Siemens Kunststiftung (Ernst von Siemens Art Foundation). After the 'sell-off of cultural significance by the noble house of Fürstenberg', it was described as 'the trophy among the new acquisitions.

== List of works by the Master of Meßkirch ==
In 1933, Heinrich Feurstein numbered his list according to the alphabetical order of the locations at that time. Not all are the current locations. The Great State Exhibition from 8 December 2017 to 2 April 2018 in Stuttgart presented the most complete display of the works of the Master of Meßkirch to date. The exhibition and catalogue attempted to recreate the original contexts of the works. As a few works could not be exhibited (marked with n.a.), this list is sorted chronologically according to the year of creation of the works, and in the case of the altars from St. Martin's, according to the reconstructed contexts of the works as listed in the Stuttgart catalogue.

Chronological Catalogue of the Works of the Master of Meßkirch
Image	Description	Work Context	Collection	Inventory Number	Location	Provenance	Catalogues	
Image	Description	Work Context	Collection	Inventory Number	Location	Provenance	LaSt (2017)	Fst (1933)
	Portrait of Eitelfriedrich III. von Zollern; 1520; 22 × 32.8 cm Softwood, glued to a parqueted wooden panel		Vatican Museums	40450	Vatican Museums	Created during the lifetime of Eitel Friedrich III, documented from 1909 when the portraits were transferred from the "magazzini" to the Pinacoteca	1	
	Portrait of Johanna Corsselar van Witthem; 1520; 22 × 32.8 cm Softwood, glued to a parqueted wooden panel		Vatican Museums	40452	Vatican Museums	Created during the lifetime of Eitel Friedrich III., documented from 1909 when the portraits were transferred from the "magazzini" to the Pinacoteca	2	
	Sigmaringen Marian Panels; The Annunciation; 1520; 75 × 159 cm Softwood, joined at top left	Sigmaringen Marian Panels	Princely Hohenzollern Collections	7480	Princely Hohenzollern Collections	Original commissioner and subsequent owners unknown, art dealer Aaron S. Drey (WD), before 1828. Via Galerie Heinemann, from 1928 to Hohenzollern-Sigmaringen	3	
	Sigmaringen Marian Panels; The Visitation; 1520; 75 × 159 cm Softwood, joined at top right	Sigmaringen Marian Panels	Princely Hohenzollern Collections	7481	Princely Hohenzollern Collections	Original commissioner and subsequent owners unknown, art dealer Aaron S. Drey (WD), before 1828. Via Galerie Heinemann, from 1928 to Hohenzollern-Sigmaringen	4	
	Sigmaringen Marian Panels; The Nativity; 1520; 76.5 × 159.3 cm Softwood, joined at top right	Sigmaringen Marian Panels	Princely Hohenzollern Collections	7482	Princely Hohenzollern Collections	Original commissioner and subsequent owners unknown, before 1917 unknown owner named Blumenreich via Kunsthandlung Julius Böhler, sold to Rudolf Chillingworth (WD) on 5.12.1918. Galerie Fischer (WD), auctioned on 5.9.1922 to M. Staehlin, Basel. Via Galerie Heinemann, from 1928 to Hohenzollern-Sigmaringen	5	
	Sigmaringen Marian Panels; The Adoration of the Magi; 1520; 77 × 159.3 cm Softwood, joined at top left WD	Sigmaringen Marian Panels	Princely Hohenzollern Collections	7483	Princely Hohenzollern Collections	Original commissioner and subsequent owners unknown, before 1917 unknown owner named Blumenreich via Kunsthandlung Julius Böhler, sold to Rudolf Chillingworth (WD) on 5.12.1918. Galerie Fischer (WD), auctioned on 5.9.1922 to M. Staehlin, Basel. Via Galerie Heinemann, from 1928 to Hohenzollern-Sigmaringen	6	
	The Holy Trinity with Angels, Saints, and the Bubenhofen Donor Family; Before 1523; 95.7 × 127.8 cm Oil	Bubenhofen Epitaph	Museumslandschaft Hessen Kassel	GK 8	Gemäldegalerie Alte Meister	Bebenhausen Monastery Church before 1523, commissioned by Lords of Bubenhofen, Rudolph Lepke's Kunst-Auctions-Haus 1887, Museumslandschaft Hessen Kassel from 1887	n.a.	72
	The Lamentation of Christ ca. 1525; Figure group: Polychrome painted and gilded wood 78 × 121.5 × 24 cm Upper half painted panel (background of the figure group) 95 × 123 cm Mixed media on softwood		Harthausen auf der Scher - St. Mauritius		Harthausen auf der Scher - St. Mauritius	Possibly an older women's monastery (Laiz or Hedingen), Gorheim Franciscan Monastery 1575, acquired for St. Mauritius Parish Church in Harthausen auf der Scher after the monastery's dissolution in 1815	7	50a
	The Crucifixion of Christ ca. 1530; Softwood, glued to a parqueted wooden panel 98 × 73 cm Ebony frame with silver applications by Matthias Wallbaum, ca. 1620		Würth Collection	6563	Johanniterkirche	Lords, later Counts of Zimmern (commissioners), Counts of Helfenstein-Gundelfingen (by inheritance until 1627), Princes of Fürstenberg (by inheritance until 2003), Würth Collection (purchased, 2003)	8	25
	Falkensteiner Altar; Saint George; After 1530; Softwood; 49 × 27 cm	Falkensteiner Altar	Staatsgalerie Stuttgart	1761	Johanniterkirche	Lords, later Counts of Zimmern (commissioners), Counts of Helfenstein-Gundelfingen (by inheritance until 1627), Princes of Fürstenberg (by inheritance until 1837), Werner von Haxthausen (1838–1842), Hermann von und zu Brenken (by inheritance until 1894), Richard von Kaufmann (purchased, until 1906), Friends of the Staatsgalerie (WD, purchased, 1906), Staatsgalerie Stuttgart (purchased, 1929), Würth Collection (on loan to complete the altar, 2013)	10	99
	Falkensteiner Altar; Saint Anne with Saints Catherine, Ursula, Barbara, and Odilia; After 1530; Softwood; 51 × 66 cm	Falkensteiner Altar - Central panel	Würth Collection	15605/2	Johanniterkirche	Lords, later Counts of Zimmern (commissioners), Counts of Helfenstein-Gundelfingen (by inheritance until 1627), Princes of Fürstenberg (by inheritance until 2013), Würth Collection (purchased, 2013)	9	20
	Falkensteiner Altar; Saint Erasmus; After 1530; Softwood; 50 × 29 cm	Falkensteiner Altar	Würth Collection	15605/3	Johanniterkirche	Lords, later Counts of Zimmern (commissioners), Counts of Helfenstein-Gundelfingen (by inheritance until 1627), Princes of Fürstenberg (by inheritance until 2013), Würth Collection (purchased, 2013)	12	22
	Falkensteiner Altar; Saint Christopher; After 1530; Softwood; 51 × 31 cm	Falkensteiner Altar	Würth Collection	15605/1	Johanniterkirche	Lords, later Counts of Zimmern (commissioners), Counts of Helfenstein-Gundelfingen (by inheritance until 1627), Princes of Fürstenberg (by inheritance until 2013), Würth Collection (purchased, 2013)	14	23
	Falkensteiner Altar; Saint John the Baptist; After 1530; Softwood; 49 × 27 cm	Falkensteiner Altar	Staatsgalerie Stuttgart	1760	Johanniterkirche	Lords, later Counts of Zimmern (commissioners), Counts of Helfenstein-Gundelfingen (by inheritance until 1627), Princes of Fürstenberg (by inheritance until 1837), Werner von Haxthausen (1838–1842), Hermann von und zu Brenken (by inheritance until 1894), Richard von Kaufmann (purchased, until 1906), Friends of the Staatsgalerie (WD, purchased, 1906), Staatsgalerie Stuttgart (purchased, 1929), Würth Collection (on loan to complete the altar, 2013)	11	100
	Falkensteiner Altar; Saint Andrew; After 1530; Softwood; 50 × 29 cm	Falkensteiner Altar	Würth Collection	15605/4	Johanniterkirche	Lords, later Counts of Zimmern (commissioners), Counts of Helfenstein-Gundelfingen (by inheritance until 1627), Princes of Fürstenberg (by inheritance until 2013), Würth Collection (purchased, 2013)	13	21
	Falkensteiner Altar; Saints Sebastian and Rochus; After 1530; Softwood; 51 × 31 cm	Falkensteiner Altar	Würth Collection	15605/5	Johanniterkirche	Lords, later Counts of Zimmern (commissioners), Counts of Helfenstein-Gundelfingen (by inheritance until 1627), Princes of Fürstenberg (by inheritance until 2013), Würth Collection (purchased, 2013)	15	24
	Sigmaringen House Altar; Saint Apollonia with the Coat of Arms of the Counts of Henneberg; 1531 ? 18 × 30 cm	Sigmaringen House Altar	Princely Hohenzollern Collections		Princely Hohenzollern Collections	Wedding gift from Apollonia von Henneberg WD on the occasion of her daughter Anna von Zimmern's marriage to Jobst Nikolaus II. von Hohenzollern, 1531, permanently in family possession	n.a.	97
	Sigmaringen House Altar; Saint Agnes with the Coat of Arms of the Countess of Werdenberg; 1531 ? 18 × 30 cm	Sigmaringen House Altar	Princely Hohenzollern Collections		Princely Hohenzollern Collections	Wedding gift from Apollonia von Henneberg (WD) on the occasion of her daughter Anna von Zimmern's marriage to Jobst Nikolaus II. von Hohenzollern, 1531, permanently in family possession	n.a.	97
	Sigmaringen House Altar; Saint Ursula with the Coat of Arms of the Schenken von Limburg; 1531 ? 18 × 30 cm	Sigmaringen House Altar WD	Princely Hohenzollern Collections		Princely Hohenzollern Collections	Wedding gift from Apollonia von Henneberg (WD) on the occasion of her daughter Anna von Zimmern's marriage to Jobst Nikolaus II. von Hohenzollern, 1531, permanently in family possession	n.a.	97
	Sigmaringen House Altar; Saint Barbara with the Coat of Arms of the Countess of Wertheim-Breuberg; 1531 ? 18 × 30 cm	Sigmaringen House Altar; WD	Princely Hohenzollern Collections		Princely Hohenzollern Collections	Wedding gift from Apollonia von Henneberg WD on the occasion of her daughter Anna von Zimmern's marriage to Jobst Nikolaus II. von Hohenzollern, 1531, permanently in family possession	n.a.	97
	Decoration of the Heiligkreuztal Monastery Church; The Annunciation; 1532–1535; Lime-Secco painting	Decoration of the Cistercian Nuns' Monastery Church in Heiligkreuztal	Heiligkreuztal Monastery		Monastery Church, North Wall	Covered with whitewash from 1699, partially uncovered in the 1950s		52
	Decoration of the Heiligkreuztal Monastery Church; The Visitation; 1532–1535; Lime-Secco painting	Decoration of the Cistercian Nuns' Monastery Church in Heiligkreuztal	Heiligkreuztal Monastery		Monastery Church, North Wall	Covered with whitewash from 1699, partially uncovered in the 1950s		53
	Decoration of the Heiligkreuztal Monastery Church; Two Kneeling Angels with a Scroll; 1532–1535; Lime-Secco painting	Decoration of the Cistercian Nuns' Monastery Church in Heiligkreuztal	Heiligkreuztal Monastery		Monastery Church, North Wall	Covered with whitewash from 1699, partially uncovered in the 1950s		54
	Decoration of the Heiligkreuztal Monastery Church; The M voitures of Manna; 1532–1535; Lime-Secco painting	Decoration of the Cistercian Nuns' Monastery Church in Heiligkreuztal	Heiligkreuztal Monastery		Monastery Church, North Wall	Covered with whitewash from 1699, partially uncovered in the 1950s		55
	Decoration of the Heiligkreuztal Monastery Church; The Annunciation to the Shepherds; 1532–1535; Lime-Secco painting	Decoration of the Cistercian Nuns' Monastery Church in Heiligkreuztal	Heiligkreuztal Monastery		Monastery Church, North Wall	Covered with whitewash from 1699, partially uncovered in the 1950s		56
	Decoration of the Heiligkreuztal Monastery Church; Herod; 1532–1535; Lime-Secco painting	Decoration of the Cistercian Nuns' Monastery Church in Heiligkreuztal	Heiligkreuztal Monastery		Monastery Church, North Wall	Covered with whitewash from 1699, partially uncovered in the 1950s		57
	Decoration of the Heiligkreuztal Monastery Church; The Nativity of Christ; 1532–1535; Lime-Secco painting	Decoration of the Cistercian Nuns' Monastery Church in Heiligkreuztal	Heiligkreuztal Monastery		Monastery Church, East Wall	Covered with whitewash from 1699, partially uncovered in the 1950s		58
	Decoration of the Heiligkreuztal Monastery Church; The Massacre of the Innocents; 1532–1535; Lime-Secco painting	Decoration of the Cistercian Nuns' Monastery Church in Heiligkreuztal	Heiligkreuztal Monastery		Monastery Church, East Wall	Covered with whitewash from 1699, partially uncovered in the 1950s		59
	Decoration of the Heiligkreuztal Monastery Church; The Adoration of the Magi; 1532–1535; Lime-Secco painting	Decoration of the Cistercian Nuns' Monastery Church in Heiligkreuztal	Heiligkreuztal Monastery		Monastery Church, East Wall	Covered with whitewash from 1699, partially uncovered in the 1950s		60
	Decoration of the Heiligkreuztal Monastery Church; The Flight into Egypt; 1532–1535; Lime-Secco painting	Decoration of the Cistercian Nuns' Monastery Church in Heiligkreuztal	Heiligkreuztal Monastery		Monastery Church, East Wall	Covered with whitewash from 1699, partially uncovered in the 1950s		61
	Decoration of the Heiligkreuztal Monastery Church; The Two Standing Kings from the Adoration; 1532–1535; Lime-Secco painting	Decoration of the Cistercian Nuns' Monastery Church in Heiligkreuztal	Heiligkreuztal Monastery		Monastery Church, South Wall	Covered with whitewash from 1699, partially uncovered in the 1950s		62
	Decoration of the Heiligkreuztal Monastery Church; Saints James and Agnes; 1532–1535; Lime-Secco painting	Decoration of the Cistercian Nuns' Monastery Church in Heiligkreuztal	Heiligkreuztal Monastery		Monastery Church, South Wall	Covered with whitewash from 1699, partially uncovered in the 1950s		63
	Decoration of the Heiligkreuztal Monastery Church; Saint Mary Magdalene in the Cave; 1532–1535; Lime-Secco painting	Decoration of the Cistercian Nuns' Monastery Church in Heiligkreuztal	Heiligkreuztal Monastery		Monastery Church, South Wall	Covered with whitewash from 1699, partially uncovered in the 1950s		64
	Decoration of the Heiligkreuztal Monastery Church; Three Weather and Plague Patrons (Saint Theodolus, Saint Sebastian, Saint Cyril of Alexandria); 1532–1535; Lime-Secco painting	Decoration of the Cistercian Nuns' Monastery Church in Heiligkreuztal	Heiligkreuztal Monastery		Monastery Church, South Wall	Covered with whitewash from 1699, partially uncovered in the 1950s		65
	Decoration of the Heiligkreuztal Monastery Church; Two Circular Images with Heads of Prophets (Isaiah, Zechariah); 1532–1535; Lime-Secco painting	Decoration of the Cistercian Nuns' Monastery Church in Heiligkreuztal	Heiligkreuztal Monastery		Monastery Church, South Wall	Covered with whitewash from 1699, partially uncovered in the 1950s		66
	Decoration of the Heiligkreuztal Monastery Church; Two Circular Images with Heads of Prophets (Jonah, Amos); 1532–1535; Lime-Secco painting	Decoration of the Cistercian Nuns' Monastery Church in Heiligkreuztal	Heiligkreuztal Monastery		Monastery Church, South Wall	Covered with whitewash from 1699, partially uncovered in the 1950s		67
	Saints Martin and Apollonia; Mid-1530s; Pen in black and brown, turquoise blue and delicate red watercolor, on toned paper 39.5 × 24 cm Joseph Weiß		Albertina	3258	Albertina	Leopold Wilhelm of Austria inventory of 1659, Court Library, Vienna, Albert Kasimir of Saxe-Teschen, from 1796	23	105
	Roundel Drawing of Hercules Göldlin with Saints Conrad, Pelagius, and Peter; 1543; Pen in black, partially gray washed and red watercolor Monogram with a halved, checkered circle "Mw" (Marx Weiß); 39.5 × 24 cm		Zentralbibliothek Zürich		Zentralbibliothek Zürich	City Library, Zürich	25	106
	Design for the Framework of the Former High Altar Retable of St. Martin in Meßkirch ca. 1535/38; Pen in black and gray, gray and brown washed on brownish paper (mostly cut along the outline and mounted in four pieces on cream-colored backing paper); 41.6 × 45.8 cm	The Former High Altar Retable of St. Martin in Meßkirch	Kunstmuseum Basel	1913.257	Kunstmuseum Basel, Print Room	August Grahl before 1868, auction Sotheby's, 27.4.1885	24	104
	Saint Martin with Beggar and the Donor Gottfried Werner von Zimmern (Separated inner side of the left rotating wing); 1535/38; Softwood; 166 × 44 cm	The Former High Altar Retable of St. Martin in Meßkirch	Staatliche Kunsthalle Karlsruhe	2972	Staatliche Kunsthalle Karlsruhe	St. Martin, Meßkirch until 1772, Joseph von Laßberg (after 1817–1855), Princely Fürstenberg Collections (1855–2012), Staatliche Kunsthalle Karlsruhe (since 2013)	28	11
	The Adoration of the Magi (Double-sided painted central panel); 1535/38; Softwood; 165.7 × 90.8 cm	The Former High Altar Retable of St. Martin in Meßkirch	St. Martin, Meßkirch		St. Martin Parish Church, Meßkirch	St. Martin Parish Church, Meßkirch, until 1772 high altar, after 1772 side altar	27	79
	Saint John the Baptist with the Donor Apollonia von Henneberg (Separated inner side of the right rotating wing); 1535/38; Softwood; 166 × 40 cm	The Former High Altar Retable of St. Martin in Meßkirch	Staatliche Kunsthalle Karlsruhe	2985	Staatliche Kunsthalle Karlsruhe	St. Martin, Meßkirch until 1772, Joseph von Laßberg (after 1817–1855), Princely Fürstenberg Collections (1855–2012), Staatliche Kunsthalle Karlsruhe (since 2018)	29	12
	Saint Christopher (Double-sided painted left fixed wing); 1535/38; Softwood; 170.4 × 40.4 cm	The Former High Altar Retable of St. Martin in Meßkirch	Bavarian State Painting Collections	8169a	Staatsgalerie Altdeutsche Meister	St. Martin, Meßkirch until 1772, Paris art trade before 1869, Franz von Rinecker 1869–1888, Lieutenant Wirsing, Würzburg, 1888–1900, Bavarian State Painting Collections from 1900	n.a.	81
	Saint Werner (Separated outer side of the left rotating wing); 1535/38; Softwood; 164.5 × 36.6 cm	The Former High Altar Retable of St. Martin in Meßkirch	Netherlands Cultural Heritage Agency Art Collection	NK 1633	Bonnefantenmuseum	St. Martin, Meßkirch until 1772, Joseph von Laßberg 1817/18 or 1821/22, Werner von Haxthausen 1836, Hermann von und zu Brenken through marriage to Haxthausen heiress, Richard von Kaufmann auction, Walter von Pannwitz brought by his wife Catalina von Pannwitz to Castle Hartekamp, Netherlands, sold via art dealer Walter Andreas Hofer in January 1941 to Hermann Göring, repatriated via Munich Central Collecting Point to Netherlands Cultural Heritage Agency	30	50
	Saint Mary Magdalene (Separated outer side of the right rotating wing); 1535/38; Softwood; 166 × 40 cm	The Former High Altar Retable of St. Martin in Meßkirch	Staatliche Kunsthalle Karlsruhe	2986	Staatliche Kunsthalle Karlsruhe	St. Martin, Meßkirch until 1772, Joseph von Laßberg (after 1817–1855), Princely Fürstenberg Collections (1855–2012), Staatliche Kunsthalle Karlsruhe (since 2013)	31	10
	Saint Andrew (Double-sided painted right fixed wing); 1535/38; Softwood; 170.2 × 39.8 cm	The Former High Altar Retable of St. Martin in Meßkirch	Bavarian State Painting Collections	8169b	Staatsgalerie Altdeutsche Meister	St. Martin, Meßkirch until 1772, Paris art trade before 1869, Franz von Rinecker 1869–1888, Lieutenant Wirsing, Würzburg, 1888–1900, Bavarian State Painting Collections, from 1900	n.a.	82
Front: Back:	St. Gallen Temptation Retable Saint Erasmus of Antioch (Front) Saint Gallus (Back) Double-sided painted left rotating wing 1535/40; Softwood; 64 × 17.5 cm Altar open Altar closed	The Former Retables of the Side Altars in St. Martin in Meßkirch and Their Wing Paintings; St. Gallen Temptation Retable	Episcopal Art Collection St. Gallen		Episcopal Art Collection St. Gallen	St. Martin, Meßkirch until 1772, Joseph von Laßberg 1817/18 or 1821/22, Carl Johann Greith ca. 1850, exchanged for manuscripts, Episcopal Art Collection St. Gallen 29.10.1882, by bequest	33	44; 45
	St. Gallen Temptation Retable; The Temptation and Baptism of Christ (Central panel); 1535/40; Softwood; 64.5 × 46 cm	The Former Retables of the Side Altars in St. Martin in Meßkirch and Their Wing Paintings; St. Gallen Temptation Retable	Episcopal Art Collection St. Gallen		Episcopal Art Collection St. Gallen	St. Martin, Meßkirch until 1772, Joseph von Laßberg 1817/18 or 1821/22, Carl Johann Greith ca. 1850, exchanged for manuscripts, Episcopal Art Collection St. Gallen 29.10.1882, by bequest	32	43
Front: Back:	St. Gallen Temptation Retable Saint Valentine of Raetia (Front) Saint Fridolin of Säckingen (Back) Double-sided painted right rotating wing 1535/40; Softwood; 64 × 17.5 cm Altar open Altar closed	The Former Retables of the Side Altars in St. Martin in Meßkirch and Their Wing Paintings; St. Gallen Temptation Retable	Episcopal Art Collection St. Gallen		Episcopal Art Collection St. Gallen	St. Martin, Meßkirch until 1772, Joseph von Laßberg 1817/18 or 1821/22, Carl Johann Greith ca. 1850, exchanged for manuscripts, Episcopal Art Collection St. Gallen 29.10.1882, by bequest	34	46; 47
	St. Gallen Temptation Retable; Saint Gebhard (Left fixed wing); 1535/40; Softwood; 64 × 21 cm	The Former Retables of the Side Altars in St. Martin in Meßkirch and Their Wing Paintings; St. Gallen Temptation Retable	Würth Collection	6564	Johanniterkirche	St. Martin, Meßkirch until 1772, Joseph von Laßberg 1817/18 or 1821/22, Princely Fürstenberg Collections at the latest from 1855, Würth Collection from 2004	35	34
	St. Gallen Temptation Retable; Saint Pelagius (Right fixed wing); 1535/40; Softwood; 64 × 22 cm	The Former Retables of the Side Altars in St. Martin in Meßkirch and Their Wing Paintings; St. Gallen Temptation Retable	Würth Collection	6565	Johanniterkirche	St. Martin, Meßkirch until 1772, Joseph von Laßberg 1817/18 or 1821/22, Princely Fürstenberg Collections at the latest from 1855, Würth Collection from 2004	36	35
Front: Back:	St. Gallen Last Supper Retable Saint Anthony Abbas (Front) Saint Achatius of Armenia (Back) Double-sided painted left rotating wing 1535/40; Softwood; 64 × 16 cm Altar open Altar closed	The Former Retables of the Side Altars in St. Martin in Meßkirch and Their Wing Paintings; St. Gallen Last Supper Retable	Episcopal Art Collection St. Gallen		Episcopal Art Collection St. Gallen	St. Martin, Meßkirch until 1772, Joseph von Laßberg 1817/18 or 1821/22, Carl Johann Greith ca. 1850, exchanged for manuscripts, Episcopal Art Collection St. Gallen 29.10.1882, by bequest	38	39; 40
	St. Gallen Last Supper Retable; The Footwashing of Peter by Christ and the Last Supper (Central panel); 1535/40; Softwood; 64 × 46 cm	The Former Retables of the Side Altars in St. Martin in Meßkirch and Their Wing Paintings; St. Gallen Last Supper Retable	Episcopal Art Collection St. Gallen		Episcopal Art Collection St. Gallen	St. Martin, Meßkirch until 1772, Joseph von Laßberg 1817/18 or 1821/22, Carl Johann Greith ca. 1850, exchanged for manuscripts, Episcopal Art Collection St. Gallen 29.10.1882, by bequest	37	38
Front: Back:	St. Gallen Last Supper Retable Saint Conrad of Constance (Front) A Companion of Saint Achatius of Armenia (Back) Double-sided painted right rotating wing 1535/40; Softwood; 64 × 16 cm Altar open Altar closed	The Former Retables of the Side Altars in St. Martin in Meßkirch and Their Wing Paintings; St. Gallen Last Supper Retable	Episcopal Art Collection St. Gallen		Episcopal Art Collection St. Gallen	St. Martin, Meßkirch until 1772, Joseph von Laßberg 1817/18 or 1821/22, Carl Johann Greith ca. 1850, exchanged for manuscripts, Episcopal Art Collection St. Gallen 29.10.1882, by bequest	39	41; 42
	St. Gallen Last Supper Retable; Saint Nicholas of Myra (Left fixed wing); 1535/40; Softwood; 64.8 × 21.4 cm	The Former Retables of the Side Altars in St. Martin in Meßkirch and Their Wing Paintings; St. Gallen Last Supper Retable	Episcopal Art Collection St. Gallen		Episcopal Art Collection St. Gallen	St. Martin, Meßkirch until 1772, Joseph von Laßberg 1817/18 or 1821/22, Carl Johann Greith ca. 1850, exchanged for manuscripts, Episcopal Art Collection St. Gallen 29.10.1882, by bequest	40	48
	St. Gallen Last Supper Retable; Saint Magnus of Füssen (Right fixed wing); 1535/40; Softwood; 64.8 × 21.4 cm	The Former Retables of the Side Altars in St. Martin in Meßkirch and Their Wing Paintings; St. Gallen Last Supper Retable	Episcopal Art Collection St. Gallen		Episcopal Art Collection St. Gallen	St. Martin, Meßkirch until 1772, Joseph von Laßberg 1817/18 or 1821/22, Carl Johann Greith ca. 1850, exchanged for manuscripts, Episcopal Art Collection St. Gallen 29.10.1882, by bequest	41	49
	Christ on the Mount of Olives and the Arrest of Christ (Central panel of a former side altar retable); 1535/40; Fir wood 64 × 51.5 cm	The Former Retables of the Side Altars in St. Martin in Meßkirch and Their Wing Paintings	Gemäldegalerie Berlin	631	Gemäldegalerie Berlin	St. Martin, Meßkirch until 1772, Joseph von Laßberg after 1817, Solly Collection (WD) before 1821, Gemäldegalerie Berlin 1821, acquired with Solly Collection	n.a.	2
	The Mocking of Christ and Christ before Annas (Central panel of a former side altar retable); 1535/40; Fir wood 63.7 × 52.5 cm	The Former Retables of the Side Altars in St. Martin in Meßkirch and Their Wing Paintings	National Museum in Warsaw	13 MNW	National Museum in Warsaw	St. Martin, Meßkirch until 1772, Johann Peter Weyer before 1862, National Museum in Warsaw from 1862	42	101
	Christ before Caiaphas and the Denial of Peter (Copy after the central panel of a former side altar retable); 1535/40; Oil on tin 34 × 25.7 cm Marx Weiß the Younger	The Former Retables of the Side Altars in St. Martin in Meßkirch and Their Wing Paintings WD - Central panel	Louvre Painting Department	1949	Room 800	St. Martin, Meßkirch, original until 1772, creation of a true-to-scale copy in the Master of Meßkirch's workshop, 3rd quarter of the 16th century, Vienna, acquired by Dominique-Vivant Denon for the Musée Napoléon, 1809	43	89
	The Flagellation of Christ and Christ before Pilate (Central panel of a former side altar retable); 1535/40; Fir wood 64 × 66.3 cm	The Former Retables of the Side Altars in St. Martin in Meßkirch and Their Wing Paintings	Staatliche Kunsthalle Karlsruhe	98	Staatliche Kunsthalle Karlsruhe	St. Martin, Meßkirch until 1772, Johann Baptist von Hirscher before 1821, Staatliche Kunsthalle Karlsruhe from 1858	44	68

== See also ==
- Master of Meßkirch
