= Martha Nothmann =

German art collector (1874–1867)

Martha Nothmann (22 May 1874 - 23 August 1967) was a German art collector persecuted by the Nazis because of her Jewish heritage. The concealment of her Holocaust-linked history was revealed in the 2021 book, The Contaminated Museum.

== Early life ==
Martha Nothmann, née Bender, was born on May 22, 1874, in Jelenia Góra, Dolnoslaskie, Poland, the daughter of Joseph Bender et Agnes Bender. She married Berthold Nothmann, born in Langendorf, Upper Silesia (today Wielowieś, Poland), on December 27, 1865. After becoming director of the Huldschinsky tube factory (Röhrenwerke) in Gleiwitz (Gliwice, Poland) and managing director of the Upper Silesian Steelworks Company, he retired in 1931. In 1932 the couple moved from Düsseldorf to Berlin Wannsee. The Nothmanns had no children.

== Art collector ==
The Nothmanns were noted art collectors. The Nothmanns purchased Kokoschka's Dresden-Neustadt V in the early twenties, Cézanne's "Paysage" in 1926, "Klosterhof mit Kreuzgang" (Monastery Courtyard with Cloister) by landscape painter Carl Blechens in 1930 and Menzel's A Seated Woman Reading (Portrait of Emilie Fontane) by 1936, as well as many other artworks.

== Persecution during the Third Reich ==
Because of the anti-Jewish Nuremberg Laws, Nothmann's husband Berthold had to resign his 40-year-old membership in the Verein Deutscher Hüttenleute (Union of German Metallurgists) in 1935, and in 1939 he filed an application for a visa to the United Kingdom. Martha and Berthold emigrated to London in 1939. In order to finance the trip and to be able to pay the Reich Flight Tax or the Jewish Property Levy and various other harassments, they were forced to sell works from the collection. In 1938, "Klosterhof" was sold to the Heinemann Gallery in Munich. passing into the hands of a Nazi employee, Friedrich Heinrich Zinckgraf in 1939 after the gallery was Aryanized.

Berthold died in London at the beginning of February 1942 . Martha subsequently emigrated to America, living first in New York City and later in Los Angeles where she died on August 23, 1967, at the age of 93.

== Legacy ==
The Nothmann family archives are kept at the Center for Jewish History.

== Claims for restitution ==
Artworks from the Nothmann collection have ended up in the Georg Schäfer Museum and the Emil Bührle Foundation Museum.

In 2020, the provenance researcher at the Georg Shäfer Museum resigned, telling the New York Times that had "lost faith in its commitment to return works with tainted provenances." One of the artworks under investigation belonged to the Nothmanns.

The Nothmanns are one of the Jewish families in conflict with the Emil Bührle Foundation, in their case a Cézanne landscape.

The 2021 book by Eric Keller, Das Contaminierte Museum, states that the Emil Buehrle Foundation glossed over the plight of the Nothmanns in drafting the provenance of art that came from the Nothmann collection. According to Keller, the painting by Paul Cézanne, "Paysage" was erroneously declared to have a completely clear and unproblematic provenance, while concealing the circumstances under which the Nothmanns had to sell the Cézanne. Keller writes that the altered wording creates the false impression that the artworks from the Nothmann collection were sold only in exile. However Cézanne's "Paysage du Nord. Auverse sur Oise" came into Bührle's possession as early as 1937, two years before the Nothmanns had to flee to London. In 2015, the art historian Guido Magnaguagno had identified the painting's history as problematic in the book, Das Schwarzbuch Bührle.

== See also ==
- Aryanization
- History of the Jews in Germany
- Reich Flight Tax
