= Werner Adolph von Haxthausen =

German noble (1744-1823)

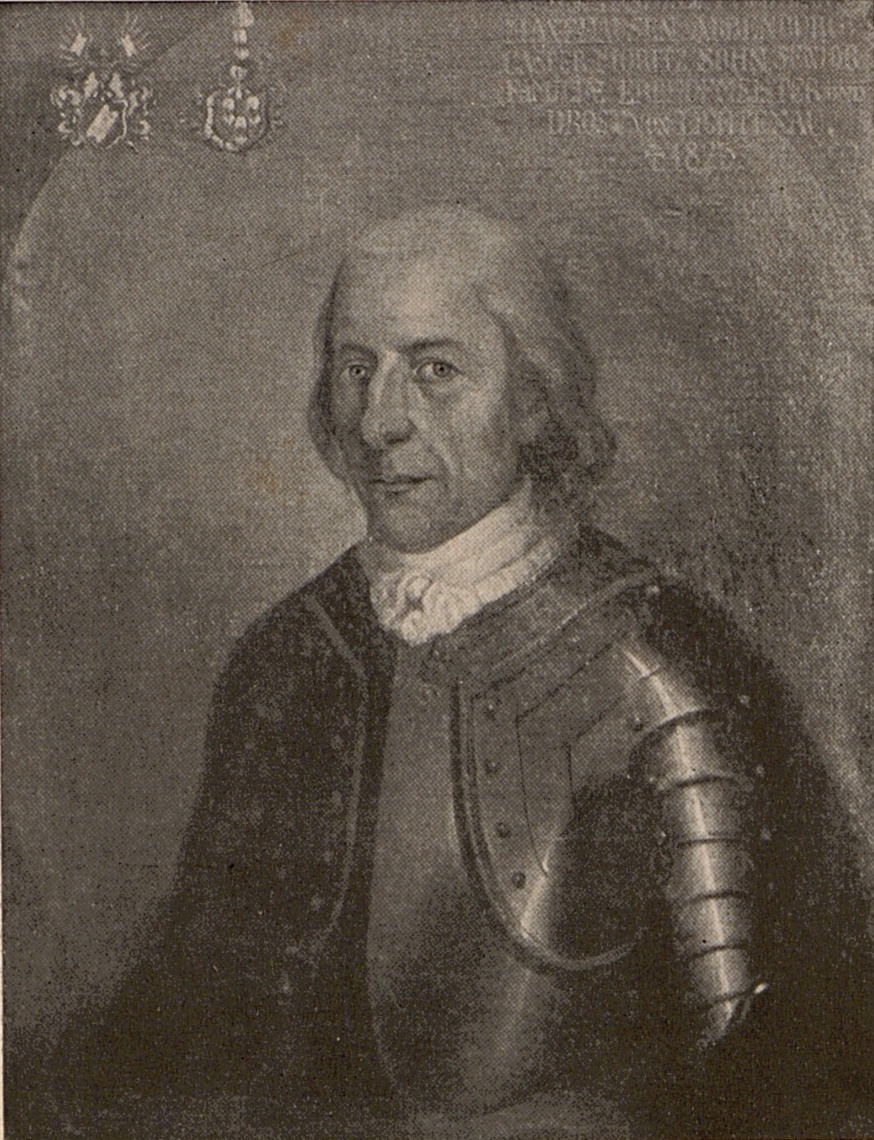
- Born: October 11, 1744; Prince-Bishopric of Paderborn, Holy Roman Empire
- Died: April 23, 1823 (aged 78); Bökendorf (now in Brakel), Kingdom of Prussia
- Occupation: Drost

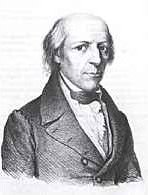
Werner Adolph von Haxthausen

Werner Adolph von Haxthausen (11 October 1744 – 23 April 1823) was a princely-episcopal Paderborn drost (bailiff/administrative governor) in the district of Lichtenau.

== Life ==
He was a grandfather and, like his mother-in-law Luise von Westphalen of Heidelbeck, a godparent of the poet Annette von Droste-Hülshoff, who inherited his hunting whistle.

His father was Caspar Moritz von Haxthausen, and his mother was Christiane Theresia, Baroness von der Asseburg. Werner Adolph von Haxthausen first married Maria Anna von Westphalen of Heidelbeck (1754–1772). Their daughter Maria Therese Luise (born 1772) became, through her marriage to Clemens-August II von Droste zu Hülshoff, the mother of the poet Annette von Droste-Hülshoff. Maria Anna (Marianne) — the poet’s biological grandmother — died early in 1772, so in 1773 Werner Adolph entered a second marriage with Maria Anna von Wendt of Papenhausen. Since this marriage produced 14 more children, it is referred to as the “large generation” of the von Haxthausen family. His sons Werner von Haxthausen and August von Haxthausen, in particular, became well known as the center of the Bökendorf circle of Romanticists.

The painter Ludwig Emil Grimm described Werner Adolph as “a man of about eighty years, still vigorous, straightforward, sometimes even coarse; he had a true knightly physiognomy, a noble head, with a beautiful nose.” In 1820, Friedrich Eduard Beneke wrote: “The old man is almost eighty years old, very lively, good-natured, a kind of old-French education combined with Low German simplicity, often very comically, very talkative…”

Werner Adolph became known through the novella Die Judenbuche by Annette von Droste-Hülshoff, which is considered part of world literature. His son, August Franz von Haxthausen, in 1818 wrote the historical basis for it: a story of a murder case in the Prince-Bishopric of Paderborn, written as “literally true,” in which the Drost von Haxthausen acted as the presiding judge in 1782. Contrary to the literary depiction, Werner Adolph was not yet the Drost of the Paderborn district of Lichtenau in 1787. He officially took over the office only upon his father’s death on 19 April 1783. However, he had probably already been “adjuncted” (assigned) to his father Caspar Moritz beforehand. The Drost referred to in the “original Jew’s Beech” could also have been Werner Adolph.

The Paderborn Court and State Calendar lists him in 1787 as a chamberlain of the Electoral Palatinate. In 1794, he served as a deputy of the knighthood of the Prince-Bishopric.

== Family ==
Werner Adolph married Marianne von Westphalen of Heidelbeck in 1770 (born 1754, died 1772). The couple had one daughter:

- Therese Luise (born 7 May 1772; died 1 March 1853) married in 1793 Clemens August Droste zu Hülsdorf (born 7 November 1760; died 25 July 1826).

After the death of his first wife, he married Maria Anna (Marianne) von Wendt of Papenhausen in 1773 (born 15 May 1755; died 24 September 1829). The couple had several children:

- Moritz Elmerhaus Maria (born 30 May 1775; died 1840), district administrator.

⚭ Sophia von Blumenthal (Haus Weblow)
⚭ Maria von Böselager

- Karl August Maria (born 1778; died 1855), hereditary steward.
- Werner Moritz Maria (born 18 July 1780; died 30 April 1842), raised to the Bavarian nobility in 1839, philologist and art collector, married Elisabeth (Betty) von Harff-Dreiborn (1787–1862).
- Friedrich Maximilian Maria (born 1778; died 1845), canon in Hildesheim and Corvey.
- Dorothea Wilhelmine (born 8 August 1780; died 4 September 1854), married in 1800 Baron Philipp von Wolff gen. Metternich (born 12 January 1770; died 2 March 1852), privy councilor and district administrator.
- Ferdinandine (born 24 August 1781; died 29 April 1851), married in 1805 Baron Engelbert Heereman von Zuydtwyck (died 3 April 1810), chamberlain of the Electorate of Mainz and Imperial France.
- Damian Wilhelm Maria (born 1783; died 1835), lieutenant colonel.
- Friedrich Wilhelm (born 1786; died 21 August 1809), killed as a French second lieutenant in Spain.
- Sophie (born 1788; died 1862), canoness in Neuenberg.
- Caroline (born 1790; died 1865), canoness in Freckenhorst.
- August Franz Ludwig Maria (born 3 February 1792; died 31 December 1866), privy councilor.
- Franziska (born 6 November 1793; died 12 December 1879), married in 1810 Count Hermann von Bocholtz-Asseburg (born 14 September 1770; died 8 October 1849).
- Ludowine (born 1795; died 16 July 1872), canoness in Geseke, source for Grimm’s fairy tales.
- Anna (born 6 January 1801; died 1 October 1877), married Baron August von Arnswaldt (born 13 August 1798; died 25 June 1855).

The sisters Anna, Ludowine, and Ferdinandine met in the so-called “Bökendorf Fairy Tale Circle.” This circle was a source for the well-known fairy tale collection by the Brothers Grimm.

== Literature ==
- Wilderich von Droste zu Hülshoff (Einführung und Biografien)/Sibren Verhelst (Genealogie): Werner Adolph Freiherr von Haxthausen – Inspirator des Bökendorfer Romantikerkreises und seine Nachkommen, Gorinchem (Niederlande), 2014
- Wilderich von Droste zu Hülshoff.: Annette v. Droste-Hülshoff im Spannungsfeld ihrer Familie. C. A. Starke Verlag, Limburg (Lahn) 1997, ISBN 3-7980-0683-0
- Das Hochstift Paderborn am Ausgang des 18. Jahrhunderts. Vol. Bd. 2. pp. 312f. ISBN 3-8196-0405-7.
- Genealogisches Taschenbuch der freiherrlichen Häuser, Volume 4, 1854, S.227f
