= Werner von Haxthausen =

German civil servant, landowner and philologist (1780–1842)

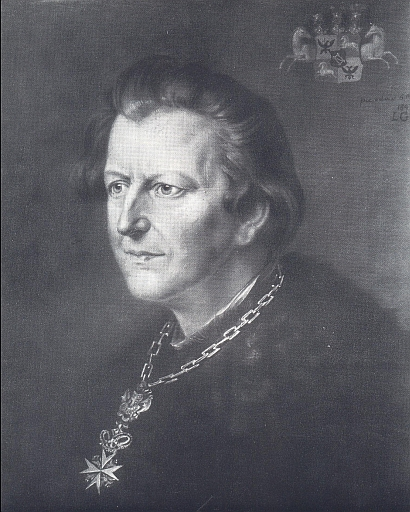
Von Haxthausen with the insignia of the Sovereign Military Order of Malta

Werner Moritz Maria, Count von Haxthausen (pseudonym: Sigurt Albrock; 18 July 1780 – 30 April 1842) was a German civil servant, landowner and philologist. He was an older brother of August von Haxthausen and a step-uncle of the poet Annette von Droste-Hülshoff.

== Life ==
Werner von Haxthausen was born in Bökendorf near Brakel. He was one of eight sons of the Drost of the Paderborn district of Lichtenau, Werner Adolph, Baron von Haxthausen, lord of Thienhausen, Bökendorf, Abbenburg, and Bellersen (near Brakel), and Baroness Marie Anne von Wendt-Papenhausen. He also had nine sisters.

=== Youth, Studies, Wars of Liberation ===
From 1799 to 1801, Haxthausen was educated in the family of the poet Friedrich Leopold zu Stolberg-Stolberg in Münster, with whom his half-sister Therese, who married Droste zu Hülshoff, had contact within the Münster circle. He studied law and medicine at the University of Münster and, from 1801, in Prague; from 1803 to 1804, he lived in Bohemia. After temporarily taking over a cathedral prebend in Paderborn, he turned to the study of Oriental studies in Paris, Göttingen, and Halle.

As a member of the "Tugendbund" around Wilhelm von Dörnberg, and involved in Dörnberg's 1810 conspiracy against French rule in the Kingdom of Westphalia, he had to flee to England, where he worked as a doctor under the cover name "Dr. Albrock," and participated in the Wars of Liberation as an adjutant to General Ludwig von Wallmoden-Gimborn. In Paris and at the Congress of Vienna, he came into contact with Wilhelm Grimm, Ernst Moritz Arndt, Sulpiz Boisserée, Joseph von Laßberg, and Joseph Görres. At the Congress of Vienna, he and Laßberg were among the founders of the secret noble chain. In 1825, he married Elisabeth (Betty) von Harff-Dreiborn (Schleiden), with whom he initially lived in Cologne. Her inheritance allowed him to financially stabilize the family estates, whose management he then took over.

=== Public Activities in Prussia ===
In 1815, Haxthausen was appointed a Prussian government councillor in Cologne and tasked with organizational duties in the new Prussian Rhine Province. He was particularly involved in the return of cultural treasures that Napoleon had taken to Paris and is regarded as the savior of Altenberg Cathedral, whose acquisition and restoration he facilitated through Franz Egon von Fürstenberg-Stammheim. In 1825, he was dismissed by the Prussian government after he had assisted the Brothers Grimm and Joseph Görres during the persecution of so-called "demagogues." In the Westphalian Provincial Parliament, he served in 1833 as chairman of the committee on the peasant hereditary estate law. This led to his ultraconservative writing On the Foundations of Our Constitution, influenced by Karl Ludwig von Haller, which, due to its sharp criticism of the Prussian government, resulted in Haxthausen's brief arrest. Even his fellow members of the nobility subsequently distanced themselves from him. These experiences contributed to Haxthausen's relocation to Bavaria.

=== Public Activities in Bavaria ===
In 1837, Haxthausen acquired Salzburg Castle and Neuhaus Palace in Bad Neuhaus near Bad Neustadt an der Saale, which he had become acquainted with during a spa visit in Bad Kissingen. The Bavarian King Ludwig I elevated Werner von Haxthausen to the rank of graf. He died on30 April 1842 in Würzburg, a year after laying the foundation stone for a chapel in Neo-Byzantine style on Salzburg Castle together with King Ludwig I of Bavaria, and was buried in the family crypt of the Counts Schenk von Stauffenberg.

After his death, his widow managed the entire estate, where she established the spa business, until her death on 21 January 1862. She designated her eleven-year-old grandson, Otto von Brenken, as heir. Otto's parents managed the estate with the castle on behalf of their son and were also able to acquire the remaining shares of Salzburg. In addition, the couple expanded the private spa Neuhaus, founded by the countess, and built a guesthouse there in the Swiss style.

=== Activities as a Philologist and Art Collector ===
As a philologist, especially gifted in languages, Werner von Haxthausen worked on a collection of modern Greek folk songs (published posthumously in 1935 by Karl Schulte-Kemminghausen and Gustav Soyter), which Goethe praised. In addition, he, his brother August von Haxthausen, other siblings, and his niece Jenny von Droste zu Hülshoff were involved in the Brothers Grimm's fairy tale collection, with whom he shared a close friendship.

Like his friend Sulpiz Boisserée, Haxthausen also assembled a significant art collection, the traces of which have been lost, and during his time in Cologne, he worked together with Boisserée on the completion of Cologne Cathedral.

== Family ==
=== Descendants ===
From his marriage to Betty von Harff-Dreiborn, he had only one daughter, Maria (1826–1880), who married Hermann von und zu Brenken. From this marriage came four sons and four daughters, who married into the families Walderdorff, Rottenhan, Boeselager, Heereman von Zuydtwyck, Korff, Mylius, and Merveldt. Their second son, Otto von und zu Brenken (1852–1884), who died young, inherited the estate of Bad Neuhaus from his mother. His widow, Maria, Countess von Rottenhan (1860–1945), brought the estate with its spa operation—which later became the Rhön-Klinikum—into her second marriage with Karl-Theodor, Baron von und zu Guttenberg (senior, 1854–1904).

=== Relationship to Annette von Droste-Hülshoff ===
As a pupil of the poet Friedrich Leopold zu Stolberg-Stolberg in Münster and during his studies there, Werner often stayed at Hülshoff Castle with his eldest (half-)sister Therese, the mother of the poet Annette von Droste-Hülshoff. He gave her advice on the proper reading material for the young, passionate genius. He also wrote poems himself in the style of Johann Heinrich Voß, about which Goethe expressed a dismissive opinion.

In 1825/1826, his niece Annette lived for an extended period in his house in Cologne and helped organize his library. Through his wife, Annette also met her friend Sybille Mertens-Schaaffhausen at that time. Both of them also encountered Friedrich Schlegel then. However, Annette felt hurt by her uncle's behavior. While she recognized his brilliant talents, she continued to assess his achievements critically even later.

Through Werner von Haxthausen, Annette's sister Jenny met his friend Joseph von Laßberg, whom she married in 1834. The residences of this couple, Eppishausen Castle and Meersburg Castle on Lake Constance, became a "second home" for the poet.

== See also ==
- Haxthausen (noble family)
