= Master of Meßkirch =

German painter

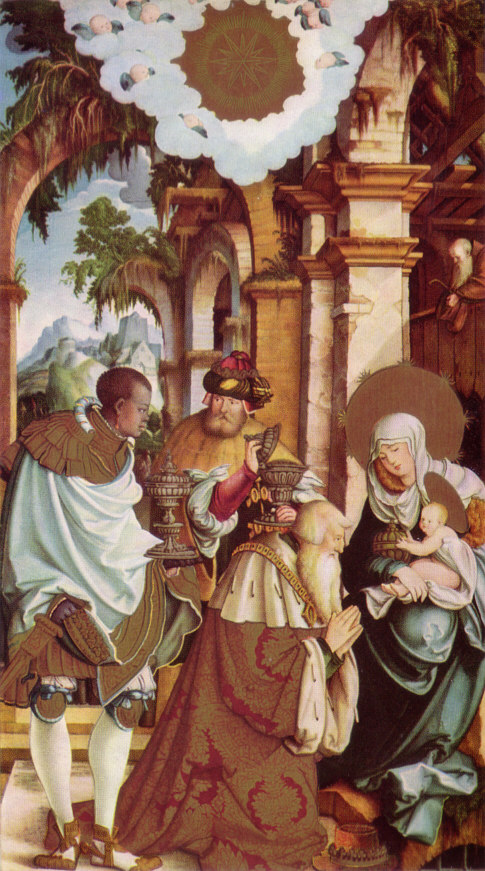
The Epiphany (c. 1538)

The Master of Meßkirch (German: Meister von Meßkirch; fl. 1515–1540) was an anonymous German Renaissance painter.

== Biography ==
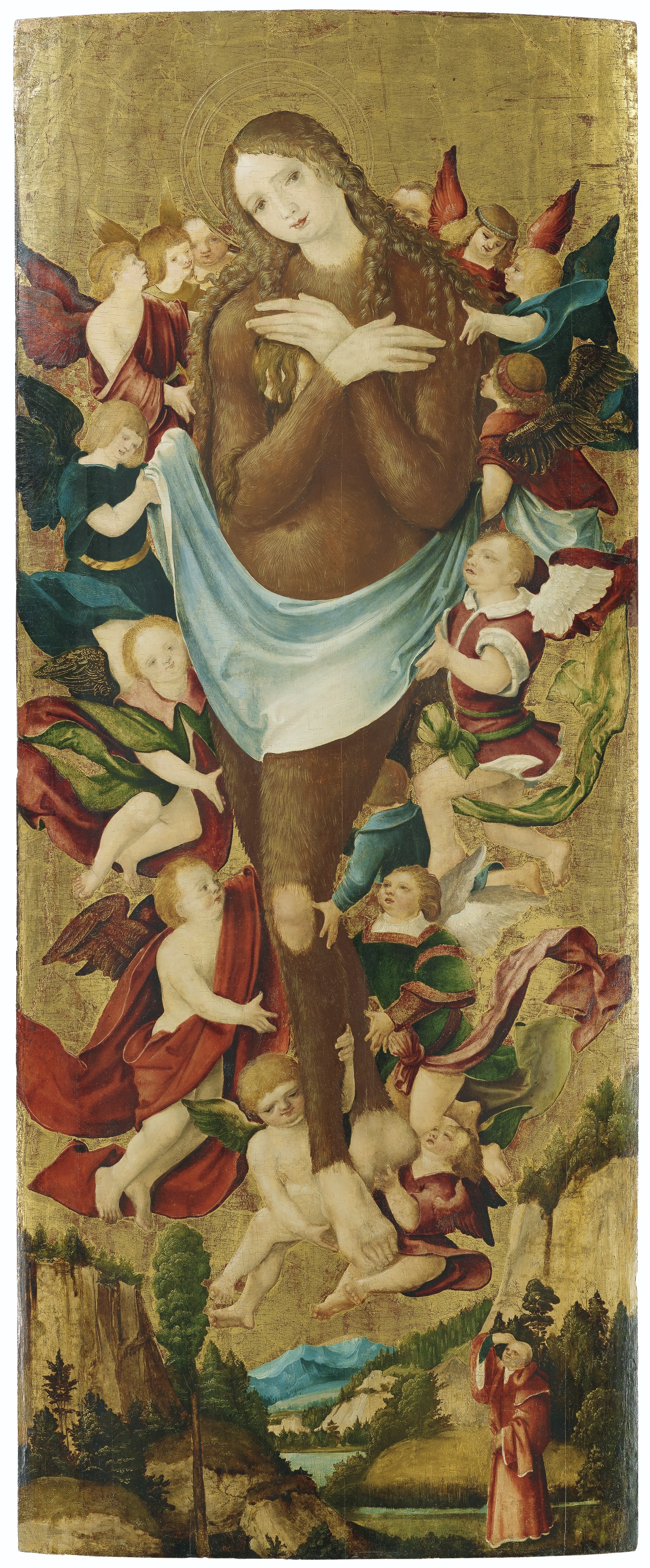
Erhebung der Maria Magdalena (Mary of Egupt)

The so-called Master of Meßkirch is named after the eleven altarpieces (one main altarpiece and ten auxiliary ones) he painted for the St. Martin church in Meßkirch between 1536 and 1540. His birthplace and apprenticeship are unknown, but he may have studied under an artist from the circle of Albrecht Dürer, such as Hans von Kulmbach or Hans Leonhard Schäufelein. From the 1530s onwards his works seem to display familiarity with contemporary northern Italian painting. Hans Baldung Grien was also influential to his work.

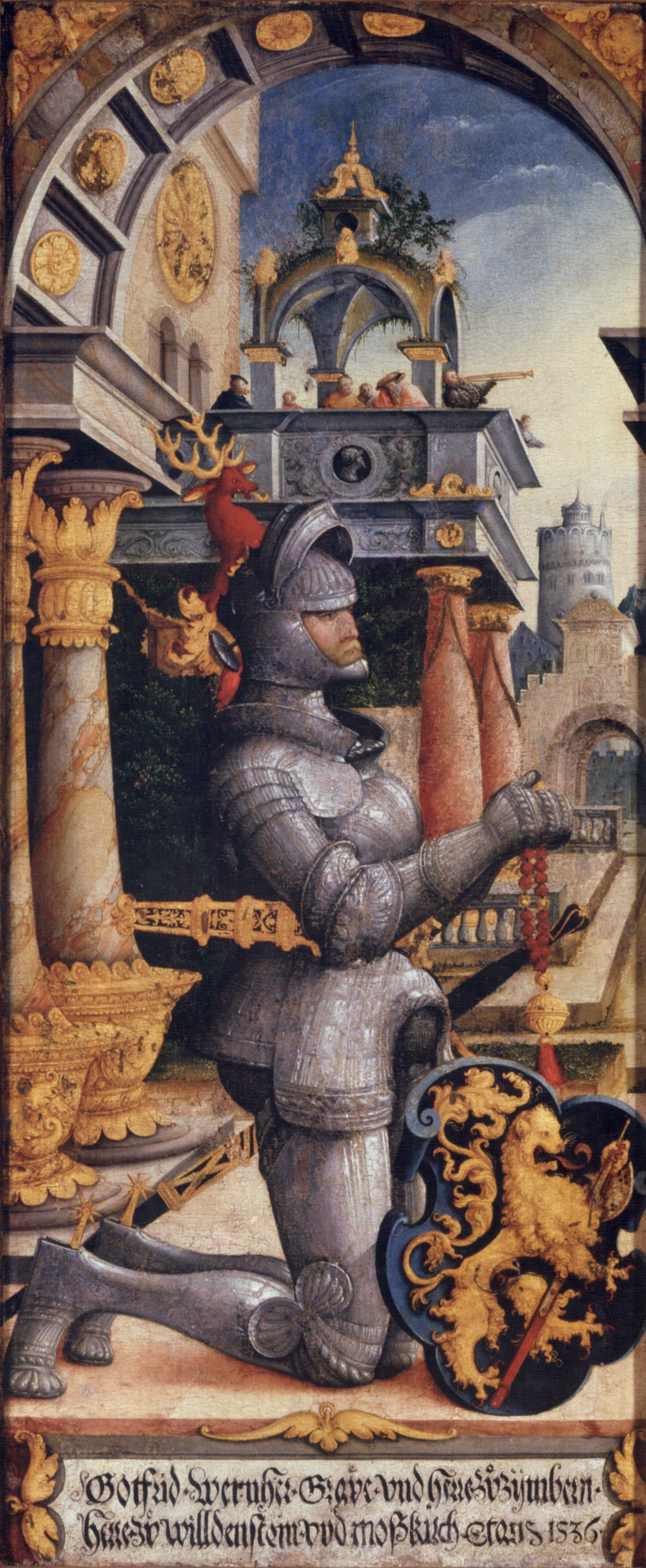
Donor portrait of Count Gottfried Werner von Zimmern (c. 1536), by the Master of Meßkirch. Oil on wood, left wing of the Wildsteiner Altarpiece

Early on he worked for Count Eitel Friedrich III of Hohenzollern in Veringenstadt. Later he was called to Meßkirch to work for Count Gottfried Werner von Zimmern.

Throughout the master's career his figures had Manneristic proportions. While early on his colors were bright and iridescent, his coloration became calmer and more muted in his last years.

His most important works include:

- The Falkenstein Altarpiece (1525)
- Frescoes from the choir of the Cistercian abbey at the Kloster Heiligkreuztal (1532–35)
- The altarpieces for Stiftskirche von St. Martin, from which more than 40 panels have been separated and are held in the collections of European and American museums.

== See also ==
- List of paintings by the Master of Meßkirch
