= Galerie Heinemann =

Art gallery, dealer

The Heinemann Gallery, a Munich art dealership founded in 1872, was Aryanized under the Nazis by Friedich Heinrich Zinckgraf.

== The gallery before 1933 ==
Originally located on Promenadeplatz in Munich, the gallery moved to Prinzregentenstraße, and from 1904 to Lenbachplatz. The art dealership had branches in Frankfurt am Main, Nice and New York, with numerous exhibitions in 19th century and French painting in particular. From 1890 the three sons of the art dealer Heinemann took over the business: Hermann (1857–1920) managed the Munich parent company, the eldest brother Theodor (1855–1933) headed the New York branch, Theobald (1860–1929) the branch in Nice.

== The gallery during the Nazi period 1933-1945 ==
After Theobald's death in 1929, the latter's widow, Franziska Heinemann (1882–1940), daughter of Joseph Schülein, took over the gallery together with her son Fritz (1905–1983) until it was expropriated by Nazis at the end of 1938.

=== Aryanization by Zinckgraf ===
The final "Aryanization" took place at the end 1939. Fritz Heinemann had already emigrated to Switzerland in January 1938 and left the company as a partner. Friedrich Heinrich Zinckgraf (1878–1954), a non-Jewish employee of the gallery, took over at the end of 1939.

=== Nazis imprison Franzicka Heinemann ===
After the pogroms on 9/10 November 1938 Franziska Heinemann was sent to the Stadelheim prison by the Gestapo. She was forced to cede her art possessions and sell all of her property to finance her emigration. Zinckgraf offered little more than the purchase price for the painting collection, a value that was 60% below market prices. For the gallery house, he offered 20% below the unit value and thus a price well below the market price.

=== Hjalmar Schacht silent partner ===
With the help of a large loan of 275,000 Reichsmarks from his friend, the powerful financier Hjalmar Schacht, Zinckgraf was able to carry out this Aryanization at the end of 1939.

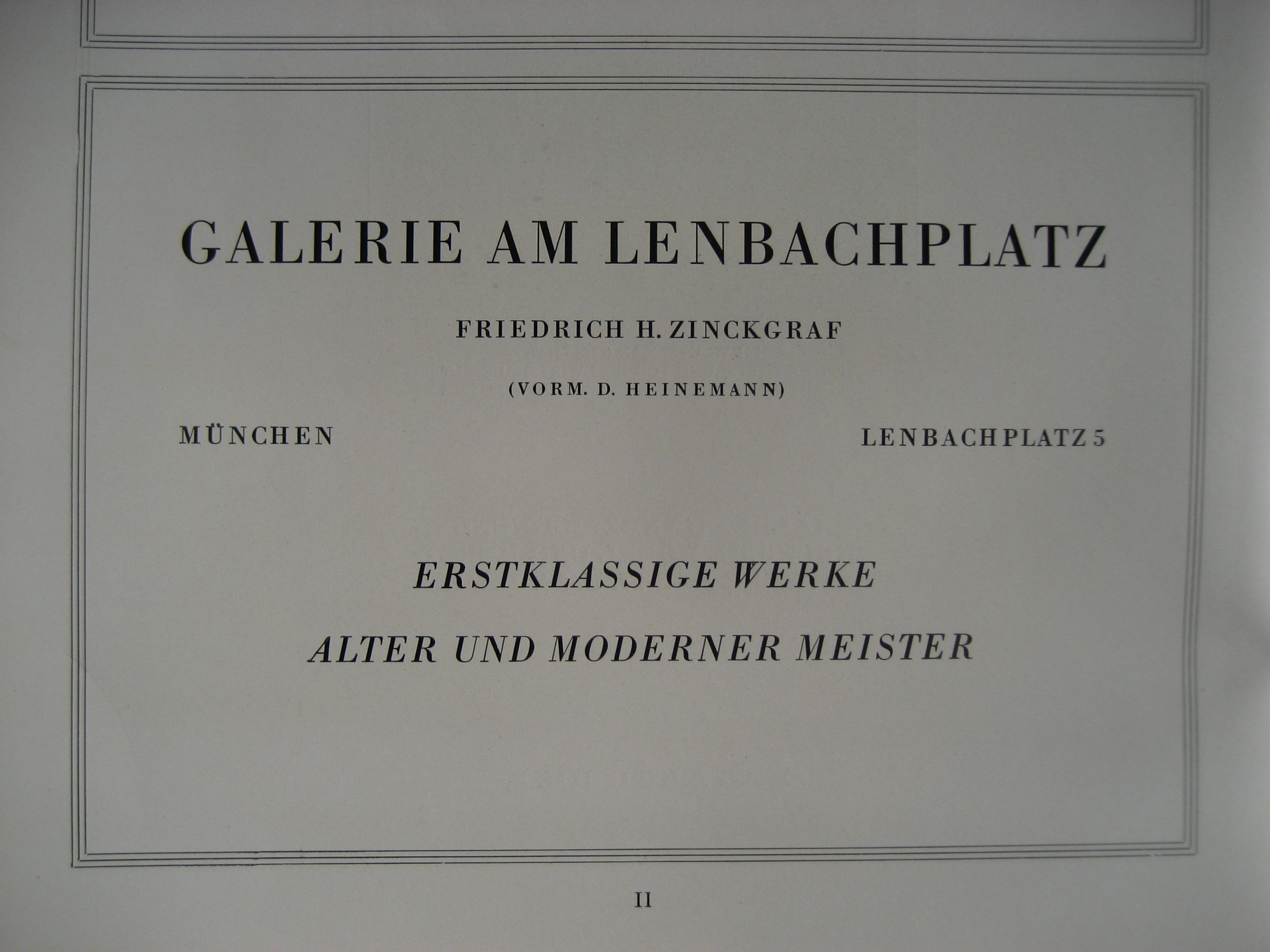
Advertisement of the gallery squeezed from the Heinemanns in 1939 under its new name in the art magazine Pantheon, August 1940

Zinckgraf became the official owner of the Heinemann gallery, with Hjalmar Schacht as silent partner (40% share of future profits). Franziska Heinemann fled to New York where she died on November 17, 1940.

=== The Zinckgraf years ===
Zinckgraf operated under the Heinemann names until May 1941 when he changed the name of the Galerie Heinemann to Galerie Zinckgraf .

== After 1945 ==
Franziska's son Fritz returned to Munich after 1945 and was again active as an art dealer. In 1972 he transferred the gallery's business documents to the German Art Archive in the Germanisches Nationalmuseum, Nuremberg. These were put online by the museum in 2010.

== Literature ==
- Birgit Jooss: Galerie Heinemann. Die wechselvolle Geschichte einer jüdischen Kunsthandlung zwischen 1872 und 1938. In: G. Ulrich Großmann (Hrsg.): Anzeiger des Germanischen Nationalmuseums. Nürnberg 2012, S. 69–84 (online).
- Birgit Jooss: Die Geschäftsunterlagen der Galerie Heinemann. Eine bedeutende Grundlage für die weiterführende Provenienzforschung. In: Provenienzforschung in deutschen Sammlungen. Einblicke in zehn Jahre Projektförderung. Hrsg. vom Deutschen Zentrum Kulturgutverluste (Provenire 1) Magdeburg, Berlin u. a. 2019, ISBN 978-3-11-061746-7, S. 265–272.

== See also ==
- Aryanization
- Hjalmar Schacht
- The Holocaust
- The History of the Jews in Germany
