= Richard von Kaufmann =

German jurist and art collector

- Born: 29 March 1850; Cologne
- Died: 12 March 1908 (aged 57); Charlottenburg

Richard von Kaufmann (1850–1908) was a German jurist and art collector.

Kaufmann was born in Cologne and became a respected professor and minister of finance. He began to collect art while living in Berlin and donated several works to the new museum began by Wilhelm von Bode. He published a catalog of his collection with help from his friends Bode, Max Friedländer, Friedrich Lippmann and Hugo von Tschudi in 1901.

Kaufmann died in Charlottenburg and most of his collection was sold.
