= Friedrich Heinrich Zinckgraf =

German gallery owner, art dealer and philatelist

- Born: 30 October 1878; Munich, Kingdom of Prussia, German Empire
- Died: 7 June 1954 (aged 75); Munich, West Germany
- Occupations: Gallery owner Art dealer Philatelist

Friedrich Heinrich Zinckgraf (30 October 1878 – 7 June 1954) was a German gallery owner, art dealer and philatelist from Munich involved in the Aryanisation of the Jewish-owned Heinemann Gallery and in selling Nazi-looted art, notably for Hitler's planned Linz museum. After World War II he was a supporter of the philatelistic department of the Munich City Library.

In the 1930s he worked as a clerk at the Gallery Heinemann at the Lenbachplatz in Munich. In 1939 he acquired the gallery through Aryanization after the Jewish owner Mrs. Franziska Heinemann had been imprisoned for some weeks by the Nazis. Mrs Heinemann was able to leave the prison and the country after signing over the gallery to Zinckgraf. She moved to New York and died in November 1940.

The Munich Stamp Society endowed a medal in his honour and named it after him. It is awarded each year to engaged young collectors. Two years after his death, the city of Munich dedicated a street to him in the Großhadern quarter.

== Nazi-looted art ==
In 2005 Heinrich von Zügel's ZWEI RINDER AUF DER WEIDE (Two Cows in a Meadow) which had been seized by the Nazis and sold via Zinckgraf in a forced sale, was restituted to the heirs of the Jewish art collector Alexander Lewin. Artworks from the Ullmann Collection also came into the possession of Zinkgraf. The Frankfurth Historical Museum later restituted them to the heirs of Hedwig Ullmann.
