= Joseph von Laßberg =

German antiquarian (1770-1855)

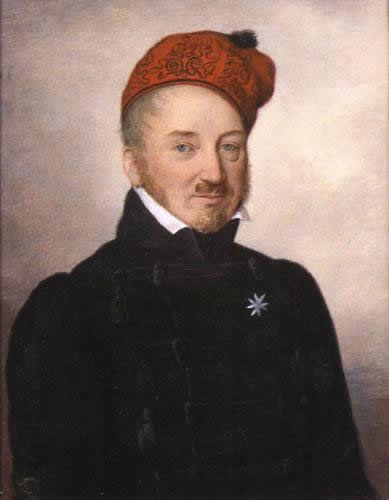
- Born: April 10, 1770; Donaueschingen
- Died: March 15, 1855 (aged 84)
- Occupation: Antiquarian

Baron Joseph Maria Christoph von Lassberg (b. Donaueschingen, 10 April 1770; d. 15 March 1855) was a German antiquary.

== Early life ==
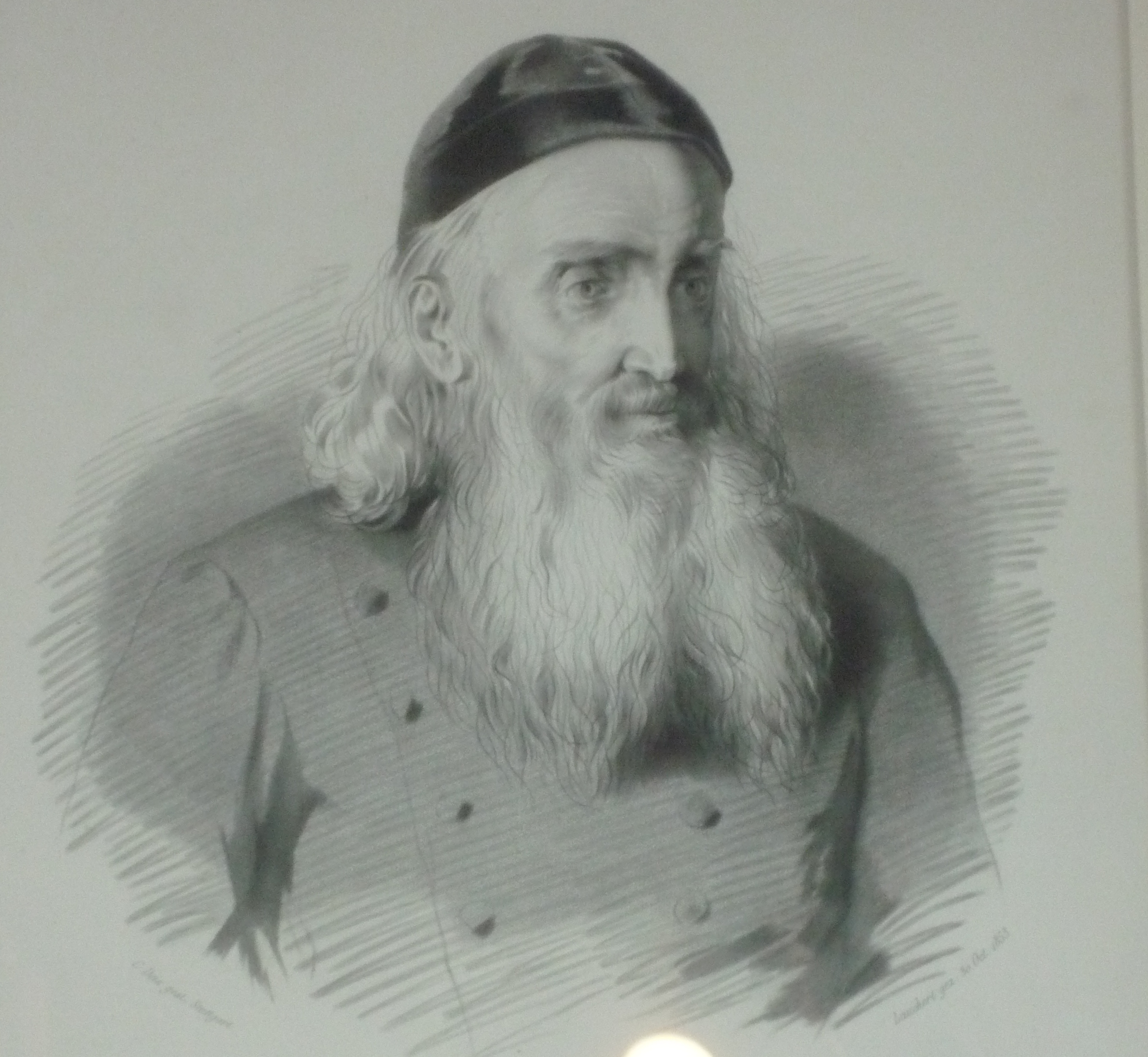
Portrait at Burg Meersburg.

He was descended from an old Catholic noble family originated from Austria. His father Joseph Maria Freiherr von Laßberg (1731–1813) held the position of Chief Forester in the service of Prince zu Fürstenberg. His mother was Baroness Anna von Maltzahn, who also came from one of the oldest and most distinguished North German noble families.

== Biography ==
After a brief service in the army, he entered the University of Strasbourg and later that of Freiburg im Br. to study law and economics, especially forestry. From 1789 he was in the service of Prince von Fürstenberg, becoming chief warden of the forests in 1804. Princess Elisabeth, who ruled the principality during the minority of her son Karl Egon, showed him marked favor. He became privy councillor in 1806, and accompanied her on her travels through Switzerland, Italy, and England. When the regency ended in 1817, Lassberg resigned his position and retired to private life, residing first on his estate at Eppishausen in Thurgau, and from 1838 at Castle Meersburg on Lake Constance. He now devoted himself to the study of German literature, and in the pursuit of these studies he collected a library of upwards of 12,000 books and 273 valuable manuscripts, among which was the codex of the Nibelungenlied (known as the Hohenems manuscript and commonly designated as C). Before his death he sold this library to the Fürstlich Fürtenbergischen Hofbibliothek at Donaueschingen.

Lassberg was very hospitably inclined and many visitors were entertained at Castle Meersburg. Ludwig Uhland, Karl Lachmann, Gustav Schwab, and other distinguished men of letters were among his friends. He was twice married, his second wife being Baroness Maria Anna Jenny von Droste-Hülshoff (1795–1859), a sister of the famous poet Annette.

== Works ==
His literary work consisted chiefly in editing medieval German poems, many of which were published under the pseudonym of Meister Sepp von Eppishusen. Among them were:

- Liedersaal (1820–1825), a collection of medieval German poems, chiefly of the thirteenth and fourteenth centuries, of miscellaneous content. It appeared in St. Gallen in four volumes. In the fourth volume the above-mentioned Nibelungen manuscript was printed for the first time.
- Ein schön und anmutig Gedicht, der Littower (1826)
- Sigenot (1830)
- Eggenlied (1832)
- Ein schön alt Lied von Grave Friz von Zotre [Zolre?] (1842)
