= Haxthausen (noble family) =

German noble family

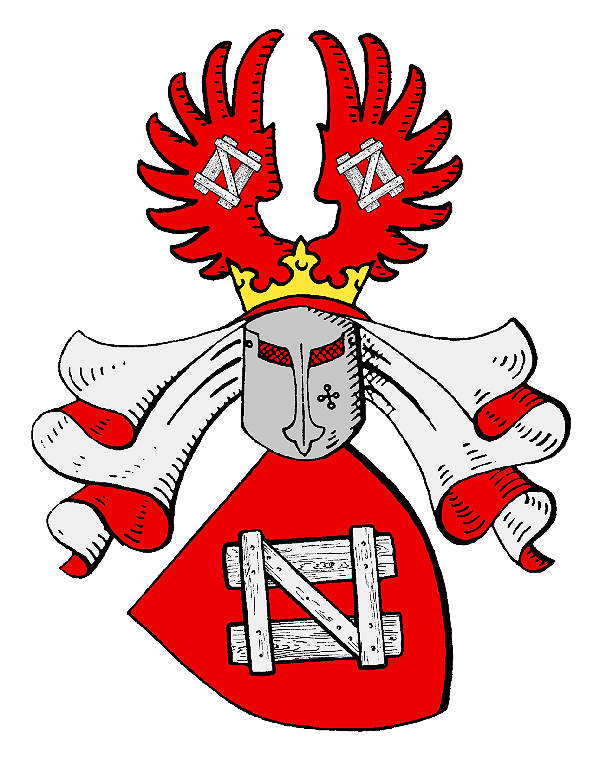
Coat of arms of the von Haxthausen family

The Haxthausen family is an old Westphalian noble family. The family belongs to the ancient nobility (uradel) of the Prince-Bishopric of Paderborn.

== History ==
=== Origins ===
The lineage first appears in historical records in the year 1340 with the squire Albertus de Haxtehusen, who then, in 1345, seals documents together with his father Albertus. Their ancestral seat is the Haxterberg motte near the now-deserted settlement south of Paderborn, which is still recalled by the field names Haxterberg and Haxtergrund.

Together with the von Vlechten family, which had already appeared in 1173 with Alexander de Fleghten and took its name from the now-lost settlement of Flechtheim near Brakel, the von Haxthausen family shared the coat of arms from the mid-14th century onward: a wagon-wheel felloes (wagon-rim). This similarity is likely due less to a shared family origin than to a shared place of reference. Flechtheim was the center of a villiation (manorial estate) and belonged to the convent of Heerse. The von Vlechten family owned extensive estates and rights there. By the beginning of the 15th century at the latest, the von Haxthausen family was receiving tithes from it.

The von Haxthausen family was extensively involved in the princely-bishopric politics and administration of the Prince-Bishopric of Paderborn. Members of the family held canonries in Paderborn and Hildesheim and at times held the offices of Droste in Steinheim and Lichtenau as well as the office of Privy Councillor. Together with the families Brenken, Krevet, and Stapel, the Haxthausen belonged to the so-called ‘four pillars’ (Haupt-Meyern) of the Prince-Bishopric of Paderborn. There, they were entrusted with the office of Hereditary Master of the Court (Erbhofmeister) and the office of Chief Chamberlain (Erzkämmerer). In the Neuenheerse convent, also located in the Prince-Bishopric of Paderborn, they held the office of Hereditary Marshal (Erbmarschall).

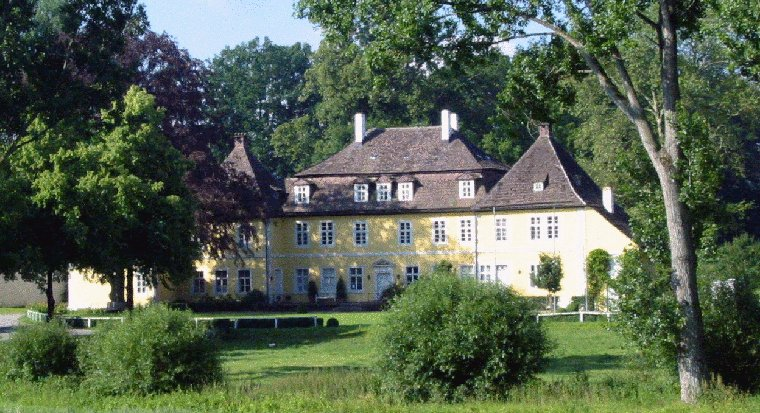
Bökerhof Castle (1768)

At the beginning of the 14th century, the Haxthausen family was enfeoffed by the Prince-Bishop of Paderborn with the estates of Abbenburg (near Bökendorf) and Bökerhof, where they built the first permanent houses. In the town of Warburg, they owned the Corvinus House until 1488. Members of the family were also at times involved with the noble canonesses’ convent of St. Cyriakus in Geseke; for example, Ludowine von Haxthausen served as abbess there from 1763 to 1774.

=== Lineages and Estates ===
The main branch of the family formed two major lineages, called the White and the Black. Over time, both spread across Westphalia, Hanover, Hesse, Saxony, and Denmark. While some branches remained Catholic, others converted to the Protestant faith after the Reformation.

==== White Lineage ====
Members of the White Lineage customarily bear the title of Freiherr. The senior branch includes the owners of the estates Abbenburg and Bökerhof (today in the Bökendorf district of the town of Brakel) and formerly Thienhausen (today a district of the town of Steinheim) and Welda. The younger, Lutheran branch of the White Lineage was granted the title of Baron in the Kingdom of Denmark.

===== Haxthausen of Abbenburg =====
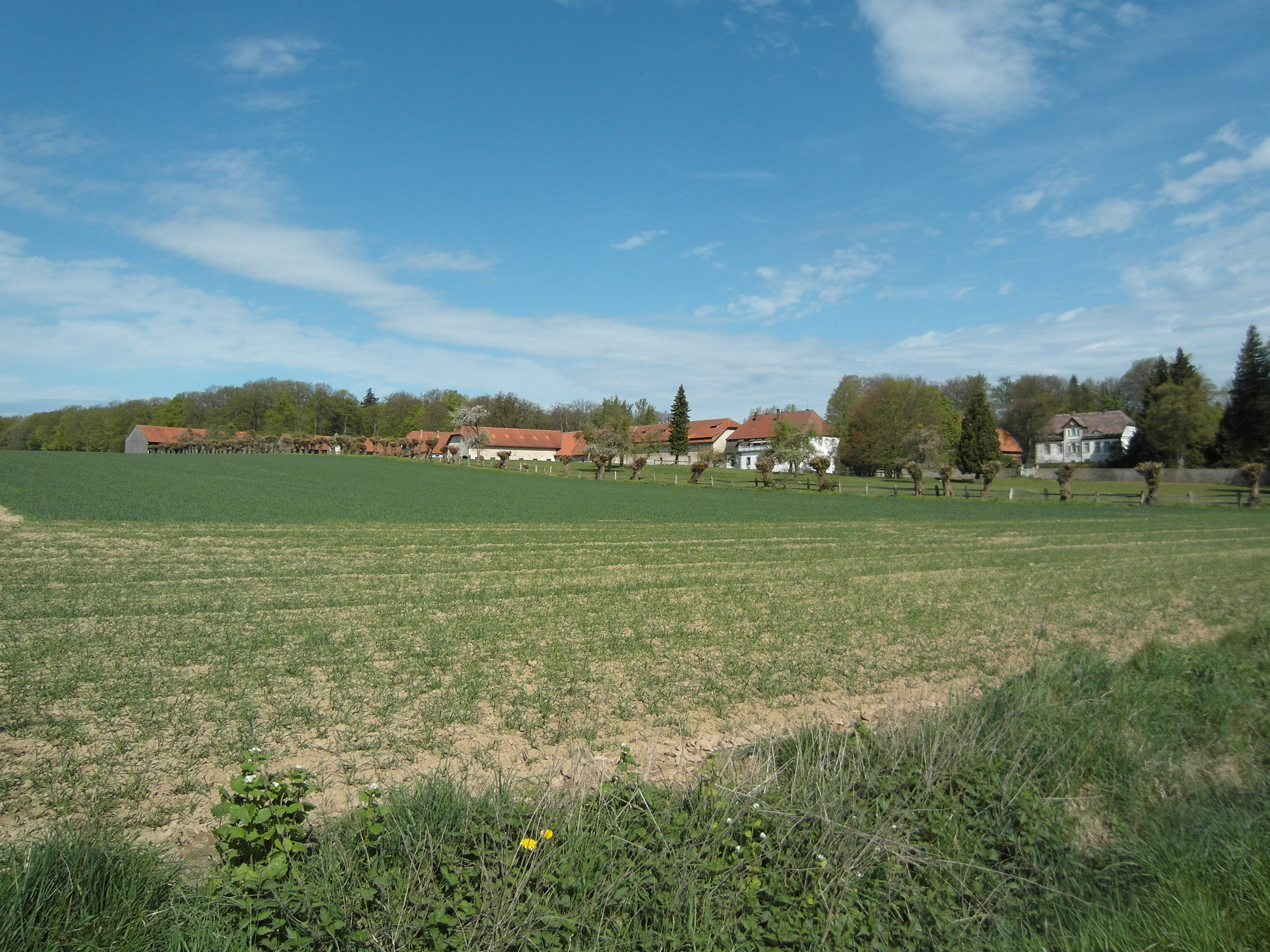
Abbenburg Estate

In 1465, the Archdiocese of Paderborn, Simon III, enfeoffed the Lords of Haxthausen with the Abbenburg estate. Abbenburg House is a former moated castle from the 13th century. The Abbenburg is an old ancestral seat of the von Haxthausen family and has been continuously owned by the family since 1465, together with Bökerhof.

===== Haxthausen of Welda =====
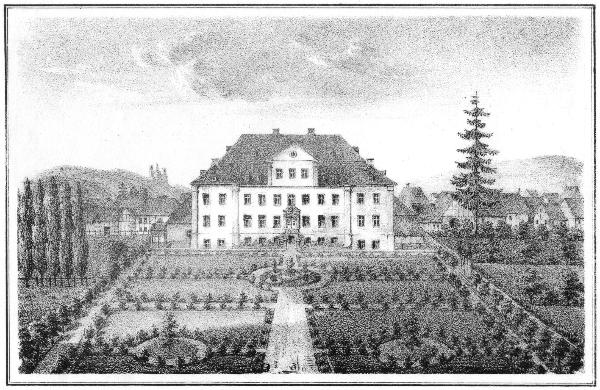
Welda Castle (1734), illustration from 1840

In 1469, Geheimrat Gottschalk von Haxthausen received the Welda fiefs of the Prince-Bishopric of Paderborn, in particular the castle fief at Warburg Castle and the village of Welda, each with the associated cottager holdings. Dietrich von Haxthausen owned the Curia Romana in the new town of Warburg until 1488. From 1734 to 1736, Gottschalk's descendant Hermann Adolph von Haxthausen, Chief Marshal of the Prince-Bishopric of Paderborn, had Welda Castle built. With his death in 1768, the Welda branch of the von Haxthausen family became extinct in the male line. This branch bore the name suffix Haxthausen of Welda and Vörden, and at times also Dedinghausen. At the beginning of the 19th century, Welda passed, after a long legal dispute and by inheritance, to the Barons of Brackel.

===== Haxthausen of Thienhausen =====
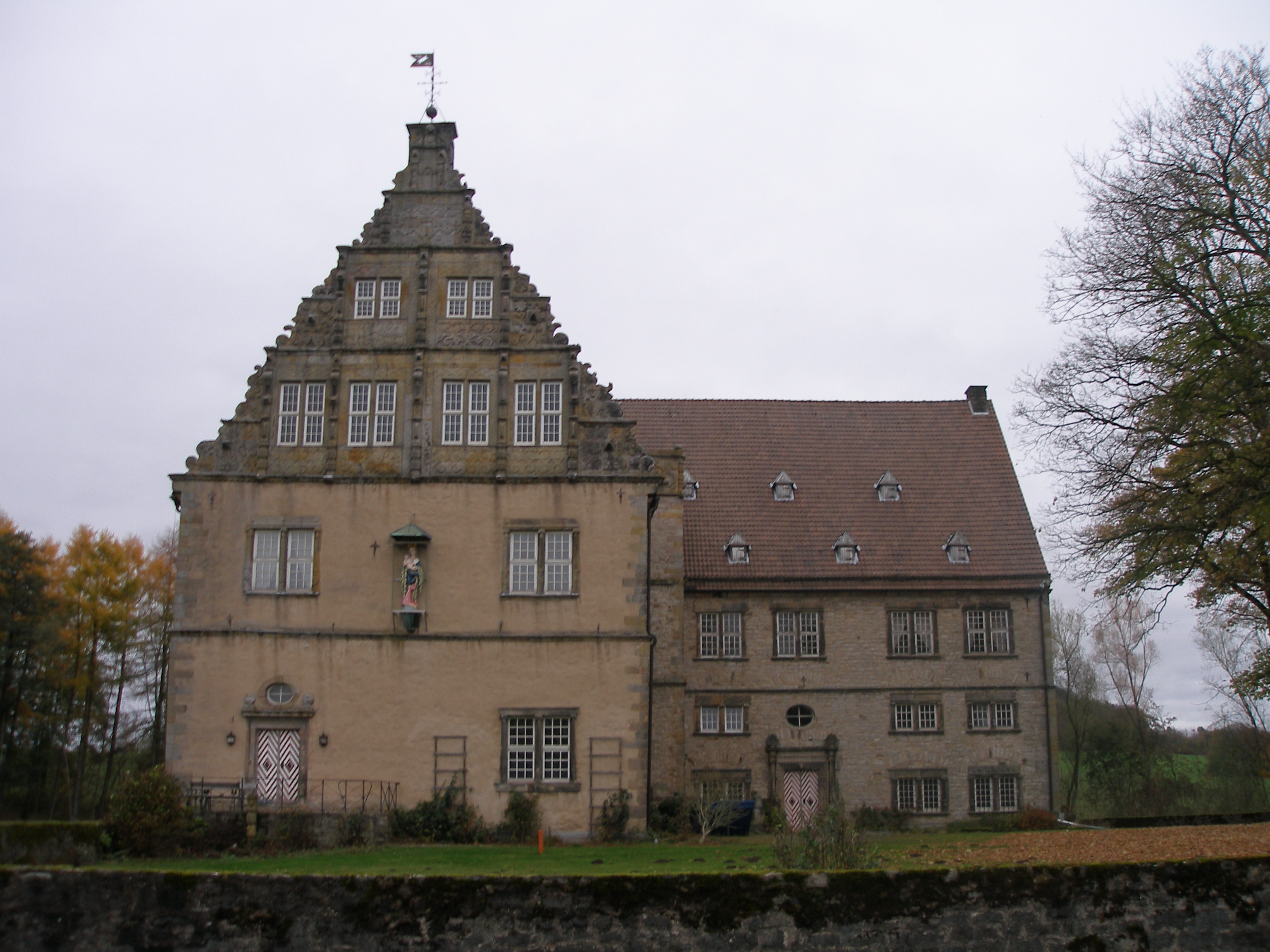
Thienhausen Castle (1609)

In 1523/26, Thienhausen Castle in the Paderborn region passed to the Lords of Haxthausen. Around 1609, it was extensively renovated in the Weser Renaissance style by Tönnies Wolf von Haxthausen. In 1840, August von Haxthausen moved into the castle, which he had purchased together with his brother from the dying Danish branch of the family. Under him, Thienhausen gained a reputation as a meeting place for artists and writers. In 1837, Werner von Haxthausen (1780–1842) received the Bavarian title of Count, which was confirmed in Prussia in 1840. After a fire severely damaged the castle in 1905, it was rebuilt in the Renaissance style and received its present appearance. The castle remained in the possession of the Barons of Haxthausen until 2016, when it, along with forest and farmland of about 140 hectares, was auctioned off, as had already happened with its inventory.

===== Haxthausen of Vörden =====
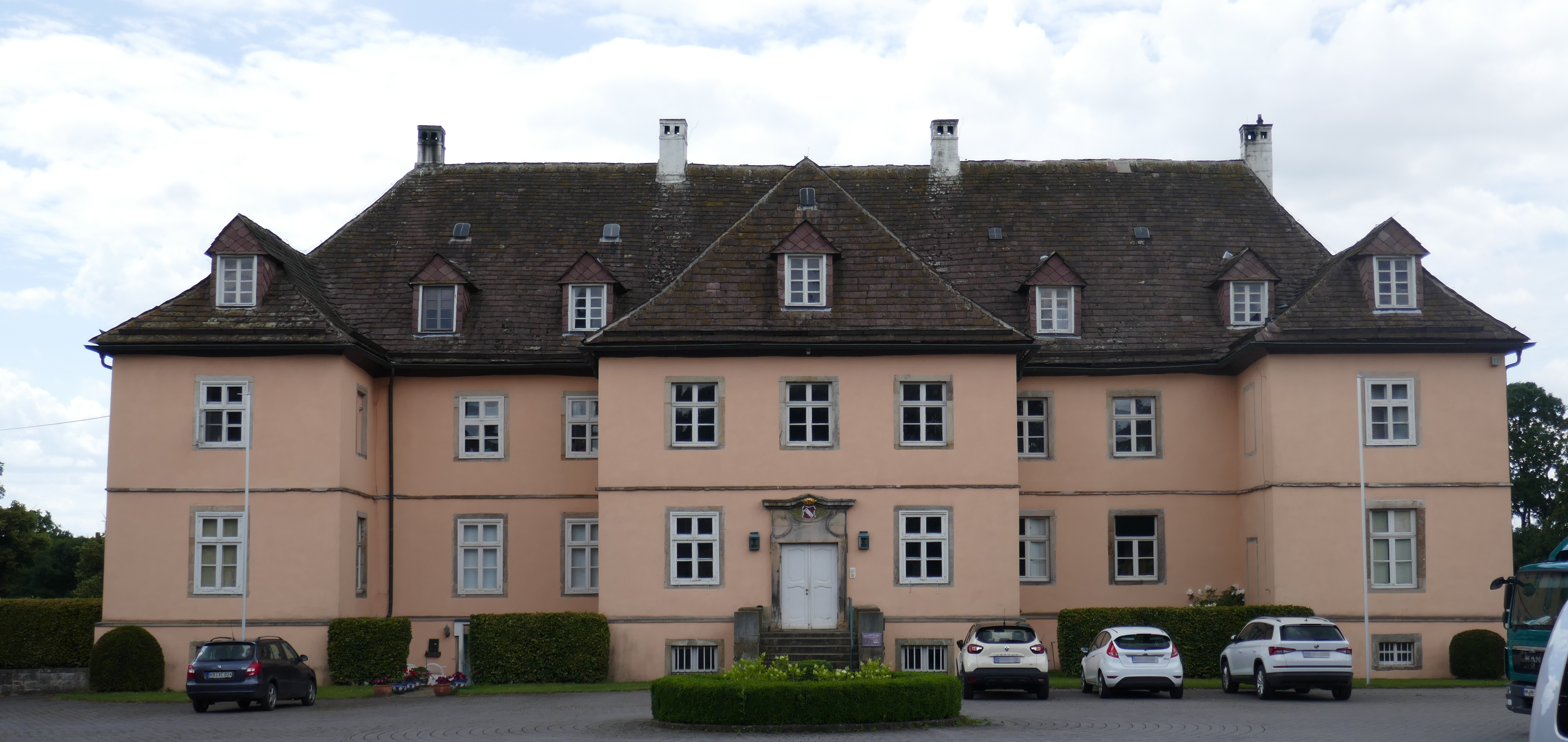
Vörden Castle

At the beginning of the 14th century, the Abbot of Marienmünster, Hermann von Mengersen, had the castle in Vörden built in connection with the construction of city walls, ramparts, and moats. In 1582, Bishop Heinrich of Paderborn granted it to Konrad von Haxthausen. After destructions during the Thirty Years’ War, the Haxthausen had Vörden Castle rebuilt as a Baroque palace by the master builder Justus Wehmer. It remains to this day the property of the Barons of Haxthausen.

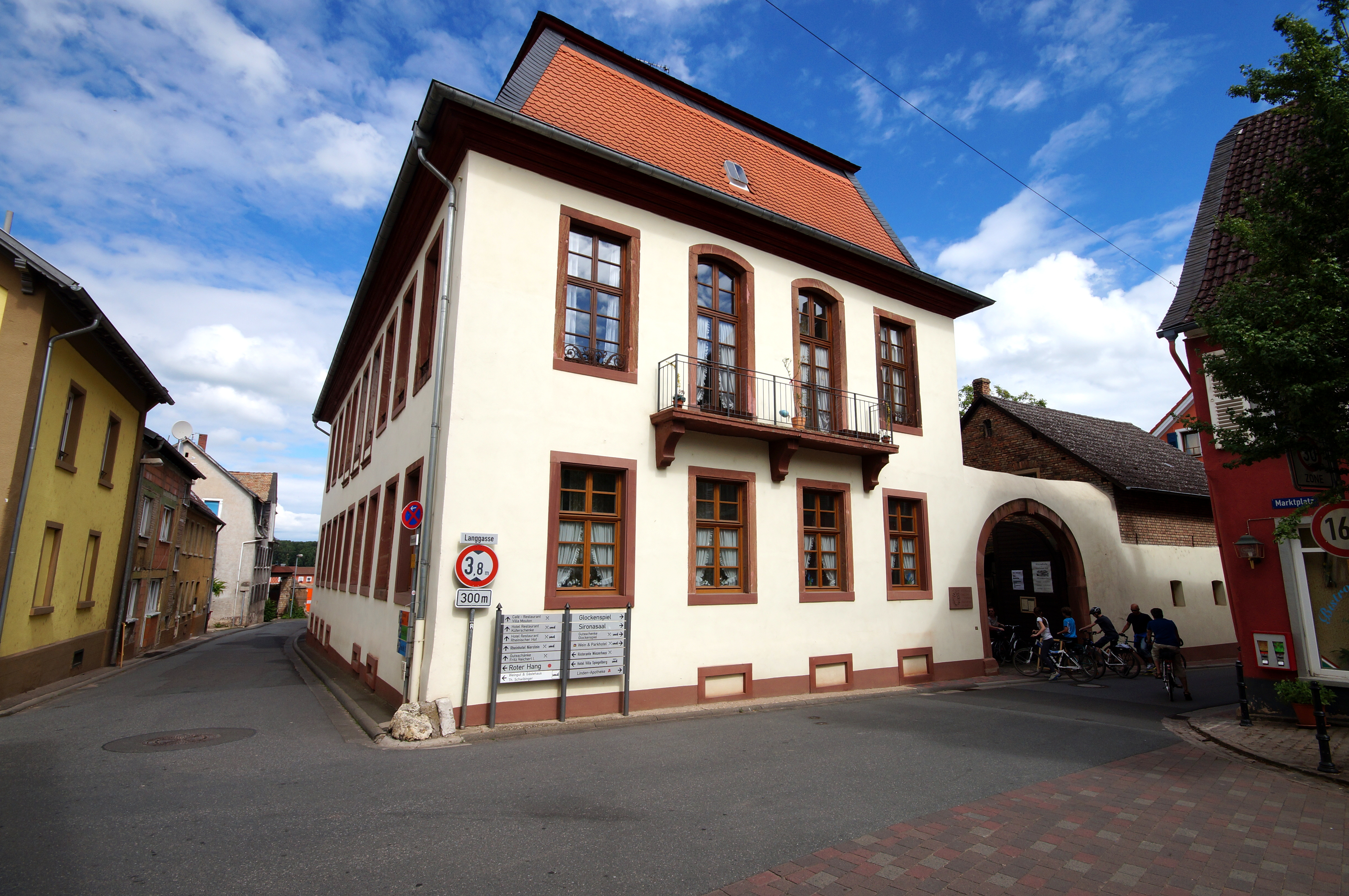
Haxthäuser Court in Nierstein (1670)

In 1681, Agnesa Maria von Haxthausen, née Kamptz of Godau (c. 1640–1695), inherited a Baroque manor house in Nierstein. It had belonged to her mother, Maria Bibiana Anna von Rodenstein (c. 1620–1675), the last of her line, and passed to the only daughter upon the death of her father, Joachim Kamptz of Godau (c. 1612–1681). Agnesa Maria was married to Hermann Raab von Haxthausen (1624/25–1682). This branch of the von Haxthausen family belonged to the Black Line. They had eight children. Agnesa Maria bequeathed the Haxthäuser Court to her then-unmarried daughter Anna Sophia von Haxthausen (1671–1743). Later, Anna Sophia married Ernst Ludwig von Stockheim (1662–1706) and settled in Nierstein on her widow's estate after his early death. Since the marriage remained childless, she left the estate to the descendants of her brother Anton Ulrich von Haxthausen (1675–1732), who was married to their cousin Albertina Charlotte von Haxthausen (1689–1769). After her husband's death, Albertina Charlotte von Haxthausen settled in Georgenhausen: the estate, including the entire village, had been inherited by her husband from his mother. Their son Rudolf Christian von Haxthausen (1732–1811, married to Elisabeth Henriette von Carnitz 1735–1787) was the owner of the Haxthäuser Court in Nierstein until 1797, when he was dispossessed during the French Revolutionary Wars. His son, Christian Wilhelm Anton August von Haxthausen (1766–1849), founded the Haxthausen-Carnitz line.

==== Black Lineage (Haxthausen-Carnitz) ====
The Haxthausen-Carnitz line was founded by Baron Christian Wilhelm Anton August von Haxthausen (born December 11, 1766; died October 27, 1849), who at the time was a Prussian staff captain in the ‘Ruits’ Infantry Regiment in Warsaw. In February 1811, with royal approval, he added the name and coat of arms of the Carnitz family to his own. He received a family endowment from his mother's brother, the Order Chancellor Karl Adolph Count von Carnitz, with whom the Carnitz family became extinct.

===== Danish Branch =====
In 1736, Christian Friedrich, Baron von Haxthausen—Royal Danish chamberlain, general war commissioner, and chief administrative officer (Oberlanddrost) of the Danish counties of Oldenburg and Delmenhorst (1690–1740)—was elevated to the Danish rank of count. He belonged to the Lutheran Thienhausen branch. His son was the Danish general Clemens August von Haxthausen.

== Coat of Arms ==
The ancestral coat of arms shows, on a red field, a silver wagon-felloes set diagonally. On the helmet, with red and silver mantling, an open pair of wings, each bearing the shield's charge.

According to the State Archive, Westphalia Department, Münster: the object in the von Haxthausen coat of arms is generally referred to as a gate or slatted door, also as a hedge. The oldest seal impressions clearly show a door-like, timbered structure with a diagonal slat. Accordingly, the coat of arms depicts the following image: on red, a white (silver) slatted door standing diagonally to the left.

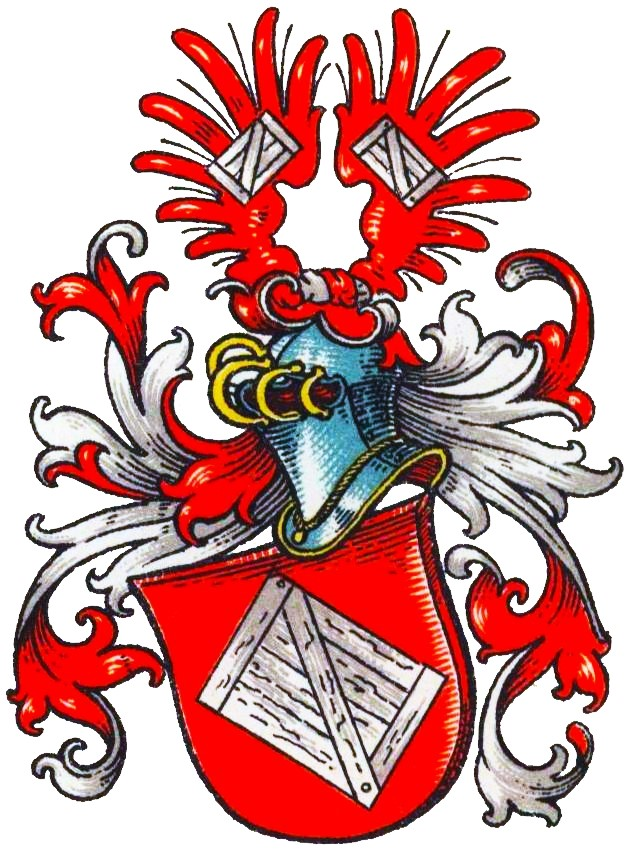
Coat of arms of the von Haxthausen family in the Armorial of the Westphalian Nobility.

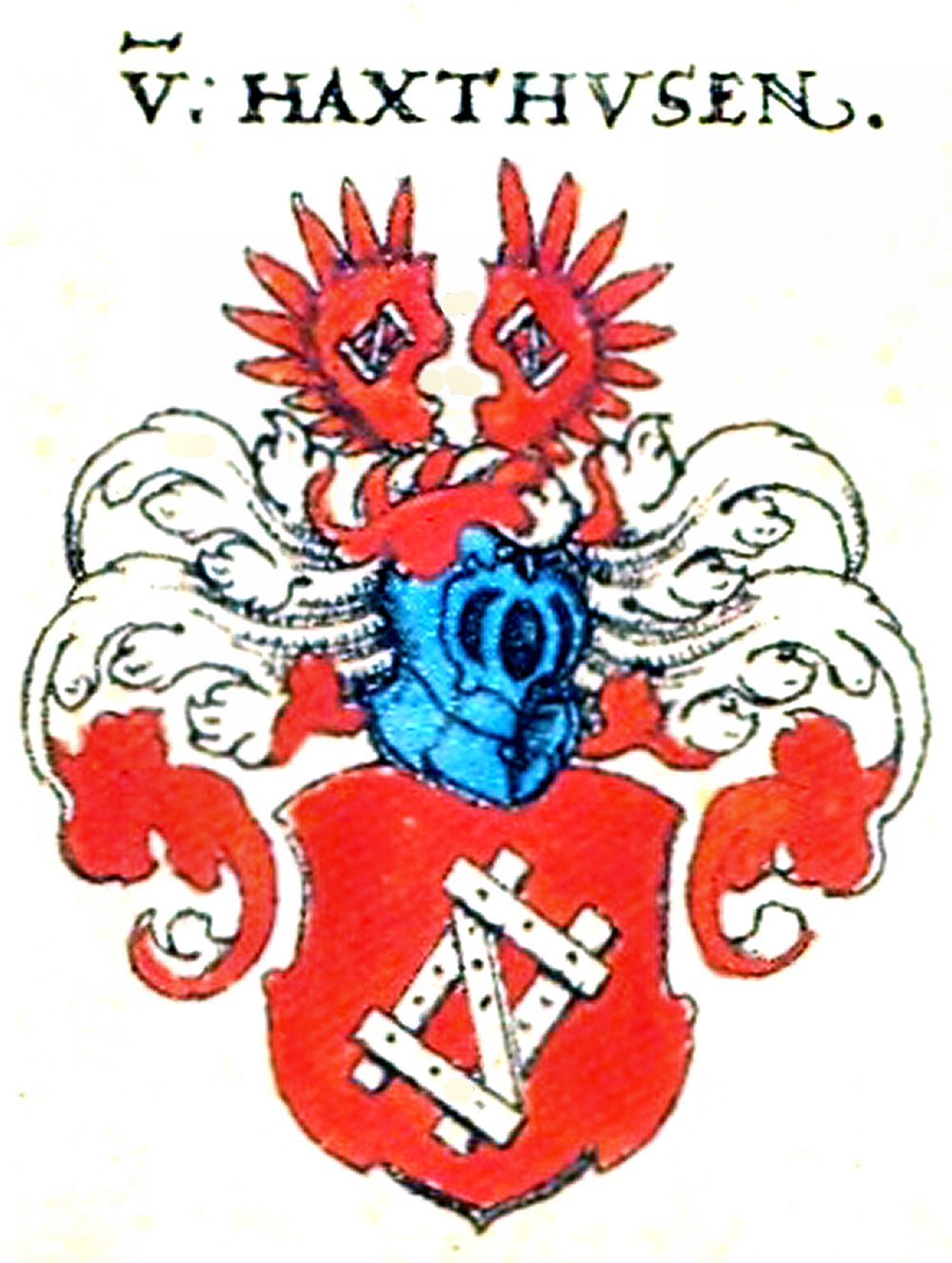
Coat of arms of the von Haxthausen family in Siebmacher's Armorial.

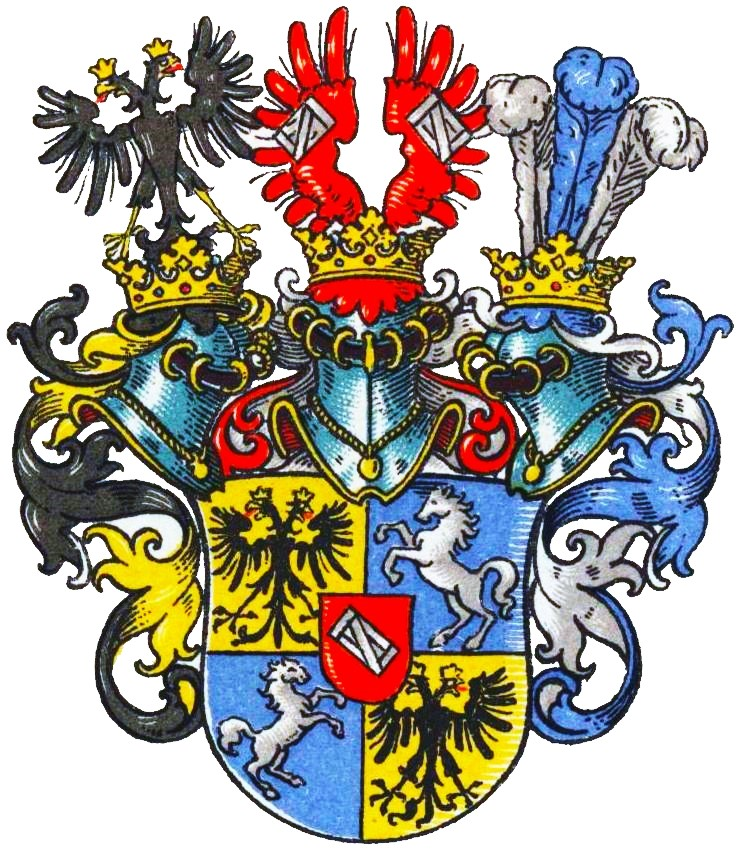
Coat of arms of the Counts of Haxthausen in the Armorial of the Westphalian Nobility.

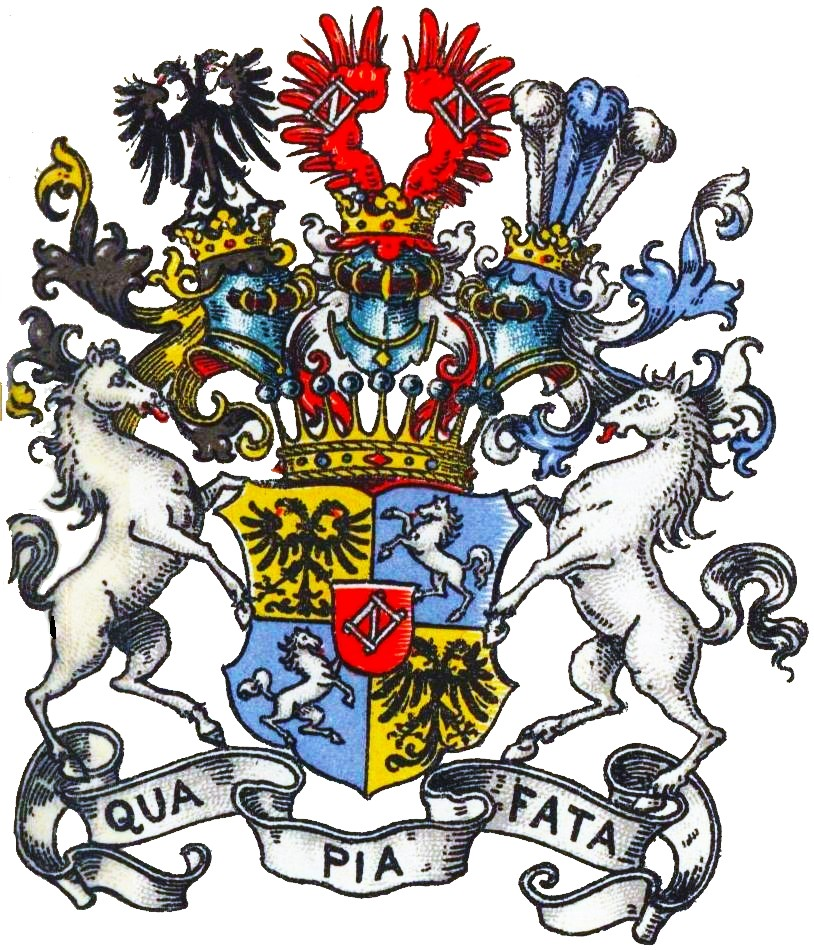
Coat of arms of the Counts of Haxthausen with supporters and motto in the Armorial of the Westphalian Nobility.

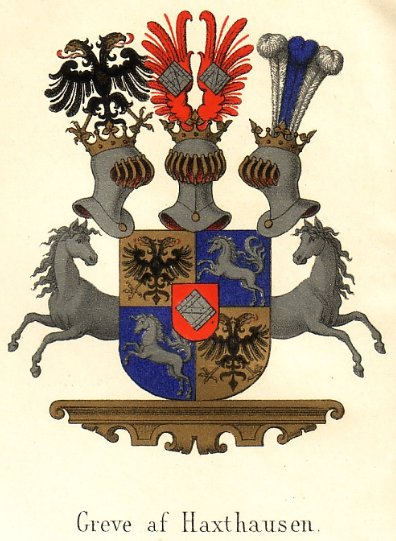
Coat of arms of the Counts of Haxthausen in Danmarks Adels Aarbog.

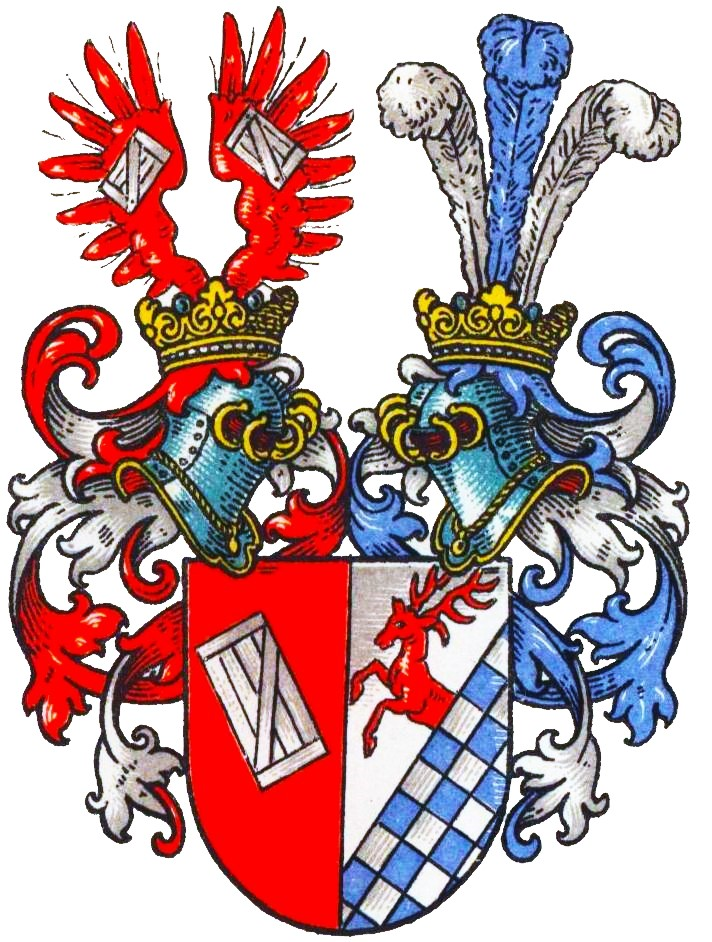
Coat of arms of the Barons of Haxthausen-Carnitz I in the Armorial of the Westphalian Nobility.

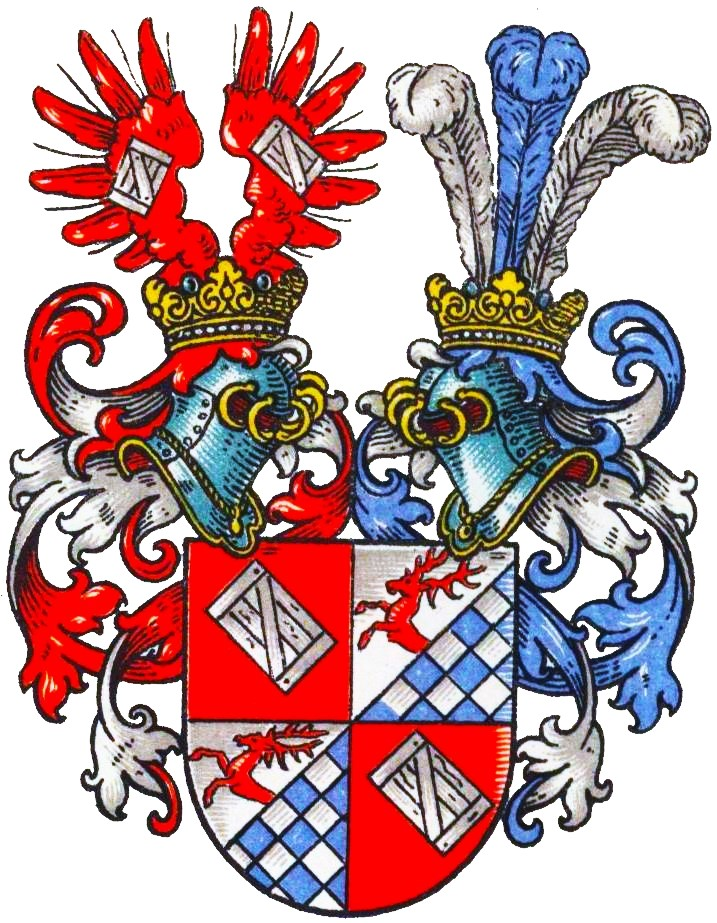
Coat of arms of the Barons of Haxthausen-Carnitz II in the Armorial of the Westphalian Nobility.

== Notable Name-Bearers ==
- Anton Wolf von Haxthausen (1647–1694), Danish diplomat and chief administrative officer
- August Franz von Haxthausen (1792–1866), German agricultural scientist and economist
- Caspar Moritz von Haxthausen, Drost of the Amt of Lichtenau (Prince-Bishopric of Paderborn)
- Christian August von Haxthausen (1653–1696), chamberlain of Augustus the Strong, accompanied him to his coronation in Poland
- Christian Friedrich von Haxthausen (1690–1740), German chamberlain and chief administrative officer in Danish service
- Clemens August von Haxthausen (1738–1793), Danish infantry general
- Frederik von Haxthausen (1750–1825), Danish officer and Norwegian head of government
- Georg von Haxthausen (d. 1616), canon in Münster
- Gregers Kristian von Haxthausen (1732–1802), Danish nobleman and minister
- Hermann Adolph von Haxthausen (1703–1768), Chief Marshal of the Prince-Bishopric of Paderborn
- Johann August von Haxthausen (1693–1762), Saxon regiment owner
- Johann Friedrich Wilhelm Haxthausen von Elmershausen (1858–1914), German envoy in Beijing
- Johann Raab von Haxthausen (1659–1733), Baron and Electoral Palatine general, lieutenant field marshal of the Imperial Army, father-in-law of Franz Pleickard Ulner von Dieburg
- Ludowine von Haxthausen, abbess of the noble canonesses’ convent of St. Cyriakus in Geseke (1763–1774)
- Therese-Louise, Baroness Droste zu Hülshoff, née von Haxthausen (1772–1853), mother of the poet Annette von Droste-Hülshoff
- Christian Ove von Haxthausen (1777–1842), Danish major general and chief court marshal
- Walter von Haxthausen (1864–1935), Prussian major general
- Werner Adolph von Haxthausen (1744–1823), Drost of the Amt of Lichtenau
- Werner von Haxthausen (1780–1842), German state official and philologist
- Wilhelm von Haxthausen (1874–1936), German rear admiral, adjutant, and court marshal of Prince Adalbert of Prussia
