= August von Haxthausen =

German agricultural scientist (1792–1866)

Freiherr August von Haxthausen
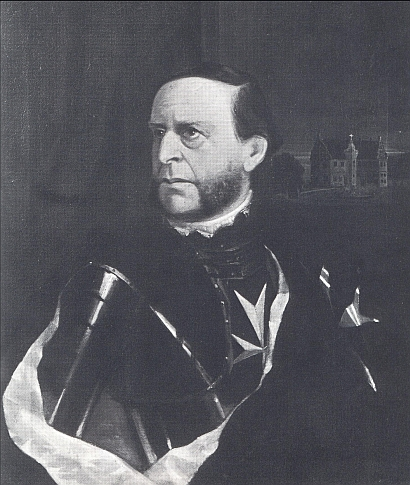
- August von Haxthausen in armour with a Maltese cross. Painting by Hugo Denz, 1860.
- Born: February 3, 1792; Bökendorf, Prince-Bishopric of Paderborn
- Died: December 31, 1866 (aged 74); Hanover, Province of Hanover, Prussia
- Father: Werner Adolph von Haxthausen
- Family: Haxthausen

August Franz Ludwig Maria, Baron von Haxthausen-Abbenburg (February 3, 1792, in Bökendorf, Prince-Bishopric of Paderborn – December 31, 1866, in Hanover) was a German agricultural scientist, economist, lawyer, writer, and collector of folk songs, best known for his account of conditions in Russia as revealed by his 1843 visit.

== Life ==
August was the last of eight sons of Werner Adolf, Freiherr von Haxthausen (1744-1823), "a typical prosperous backwater planter," and the Baroness Luise Marianne von Westphalen zu Heidelbeck (d. 1793), who also had nine daughters. Born on the family estate in Abbenburg, Haxthausen was sent to the Warburg estate of his uncle, Baron von Kalenberg, to be reared; there he received a traditional Catholic Liberal arts education while living in rural surroundings.

Haxthausen studied in University of Halle, where he joined the Corps Guestphalia Halle in 1810. He completed his studies under the Bökendorf priest and at the mining school at Clausthal, where he studied until 1812. In that same year, the Haxthausen estates were affected by the peasant uprising against the Bonapartist client state, the Kingdom of Westphalia. While this revolt has since been alleged to have been, "in some measure a rebuke to the dominant landed class", the Haxthausen family chose to support the rebellion, which they admired, "as an act of defiance by true Germans against conditions created by the foreign domination". This view strongly influenced the young August and inspired his participation in what are now known in the Germanosphere as the Wars of Liberation against the First French Empire. His literary activities as part of the poets and writers devoted to German Romanticism who met at Schloss Bökerhoff at this time are recorded by his closest friends, the Brothers Grimm, with whom he shared a passion in German folklore, mythology, and fairy tales, which he collected from his fellow soldiers and hoped to publish (some selections from his planned collection were published posthumously). Haxthausen was a direct contributor to the Brothers Grimm's Kinder- und Hausmärchen (KHM). He personally supplied KHM 10 (Das Lumpengesindel) ("The Pack of Ragamuffins"), recorded from the Paderborn region on 19 May 1812 and included in the collection's first edition that same year. The von Haxthausen family also provided two of the oral accounts behind KHM 27 (Die Bremer Stadtmusikanten) ("The Bremen Town Musicians"), added to the second edition in 1819.

He continued his studies at the University of Göttingen from 1814 to 1818. There he studied Old and Middle High German epic poetry under the philologist Georg Friedrich Benecke, and was introduced by the physiologist and anthropologist Johann Friedrich Blumenbach to the study of human beings in their total physical environment (Totalhabitus), not just their political or intellectual activities. Most importantly, he studied German law with his friend Jacob Grimm, now a professor who also lectured upon the teachings of Edmund Burke and Friedrich Carl von Savigny, which held that social processes could be described but not explained; "it required the student to seek the fundamental principles of a society in its historical and everyday existence. Under the influence of this school, legal scholars abandoned a priori speculations for fieldwork."

In 1819 he returned to inherit one of his family's estates at Bökendorf, near Abbenburg. He never married and continued collecting folklore and publishing folk songs. His niece, "Germany's greatest poetess" Annette von Droste-Hülshoff frequently stayed with the family and came to work closely with August. In particular, family documents he provided her gave her the impetus for writing her well-known novella Die Judenbuche (The Jew's beech, 1842), based on accounts of a real 18th-century murder upon the Haxtausen estates.

In 1843 he bought the neighboring castle of Thienhausen. Von Haxthausen died on New Year's Eve in 1866 at the home of his sister Anna Elisabeth von Arnswaldt (b. 1801) in Hanover. He is buried in the cemetery of Bellersen in Brakel.

== Official career ==
In 1829 Haxthausen published a slim volume on land tenure called Ueber die Agrarverfassung in den Fürstenthümern Paderborn und Corvey und deren Conflicte in der gegenwärtigen Zeit [On agrarian relations in the princedoms of Paderborn and Corvey and their conflicts in the present time] in which he proposed repealing most of the Bonapartist legislation passed since 1806 in order to prevent land from becoming nothing more than a commodity like other forms of capital. His sophisticated antirevolutionary proposals and evident mastery of the new scientific methods of study of economic and social institutions (called Statistik) attracted the attention of the then Crown Prince and later King Friedrich Wilhelm IV, who invited him to Berlin and offered him a stipend to conduct a similar analysis for all the provinces of Prussia. For the next decade, he spent each summer traveling throughout Prussia researching the provincial legislation pertaining to land tenure. He was particularly intrigued by "what appeared to be survivals of [an] ancient but non-Germanic tradition of communal peasant organization in those eastern regions once occupied by Slavic peoples." Haxthausen argued that such communes, or Gemeinden, could mediate between classes and between the individual and society, thus allowing integration "by custom alone and not through the legal machinations of meddling bureaucrats and revolutionaries."

As a result of his travels and researches, he proposed a series of reforms, urging the Prussian government to reduce the role of the state bureaucracy and allow local forces to play a greater part in rural affairs, but opposition from civil servants, Lutherans, and Prussian nationalists prevented their acceptance, and after state support for his work was cut off in 1842, he returned to Abbenburg. Fortunately, thanks to good management his domains had become some of the most lucrative in the region, so he no longer needed state support for financial security.

== Journey to Russia ==
Some years before, Haxthausen's friend Count Peter von Meyendorff (Petr Kazimirovich Meiendorf, 1796–1863), Russian ambassador to Berlin from 1839 to 1850, had suggested that he continue his research on Slavic communal institutions in Russia, and this now became possible thanks to an essay on tsarist land legislation that reached tsar Nicholas I, who invited him to travel to Russia to study the rural situation there. Though his voyage was supported by the crown, it was hindered by Count von Benckendorff, head of the Russian secret police, who considered Haxthausen a potential threat to state security and had his activities monitored not only in Russia but after his return to Germany (fifteen years later he "was still being warned by his former hosts that he should break off his correspondence with Alexander Herzen"). However, after the spring thaw in 1843, Haxthausen left Moscow for six months of travel in the provinces, accompanied by his assistant, Dr. Heinrich Kosegarten, and a young Russian interpreter provided by the tsar. The group traveled to Novgorod, the Vladimir-Yaroslavl region, Nizhny Novgorod, Kazan, and across the steppes to the Caucasus.

In the Caucasus, Haxthausen was escorted by Armenian polymath Khachatur Abovian. The trip include attending a service at the Blue Mosque; a visit to a Yazidi encampment; and a banquet in Tiflis organized by the viceroy of the Caucasus, Mikhail Semyonovich Vorontsov. Later, he turned north again to Crimea, Kiev, Tula, and Moscow. After some hesitation (caused partly by a feeling of betrayal by the Marquis de Custine, who had written a wittily hostile report on his visit to Russia a few years previously), he was received cordially by Russian society, including Konstantin Aksakov, Herzen, and Pyotr Chaadayev. Haxthausen returned to Germany in the spring of 1844 to write up his impressions.

The results were published in Studien über die innern Zustände, das Volksleben und insbesondere die ländlichen Einrichtungen Russlands (1847-1852, translated into English in drastically shortened form as The Russian Empire: Its People, Institutions and Resources, 1856). S. Frederick Starr, in his introduction to a modern abridged translation, writes that "two themes resound throughout the Studies: that Russian society still maintained in its peasant communes and other institutions the basis for a unity and cohesion within and among classes that was lacking in western Europe, and that this social cohesion was founded on hierarchical and patriarchal lines that embraced every individual in Russia from tsar to peasant." Haxthausen's full account of the institutions of rural Russia was the first to bring the Russian commune into European social thought, and it was popular with both radicals (who found validation of the ideals of socialism) and conservatives (who approved of Haxthausen's emphasis on harmony within the framework of traditional society); it was well received everywhere but "liberal, industrial England, where it was met with skepticism, criticism, and outright derision." But its greatest impact was in Russia, where intellectuals of every political persuasion read and discussed the Studies, which played a significant role in establishing the framework of the liberation of the serfs and the other reforms of the early 1860s; Haxthausen wrote extensively on those reforms, corresponded with many Russian leaders and intellectuals, and in 1865 published a study of the means of introducing a constitution to Russia without destroying the sovereignty of the tsar. James H. Billington summarized his influence on Russians thus:

It is a measure of the Russian aristocrats' alienation from their own peoples that they discovered the peasants not on their own estates but in books — above all in the three-volume study of Russian life by Baron Haxthausen.... On the basis of his study, Russian aristocrats suddenly professed to find in the peasant commune (obshchina) the nucleus of a better society. Although the peasant commune had been idealized before ... Haxthausen's praise was based on a detailed study of its social functions of regulating land redistribution and dispensing local justice. He saw in the commune a model for "free productive associations like those of the Saint-Simonians"; and the idea was born among Russians that a renovation of society on the model of the commune might be possible even if a political revolution were not.

== Works ==
- Über die Agrarverfassung in den Fürstenthümern Paderborn und Corvey und deren Conflicte in der gegenwärtigen Zeit nebst Vorschlägen, die den Grund und Boden belastenden Rechte und Verbindlichkeiten daselbst aufzulösen. Berlin: Reimer, 1829; reprint Bökendorf: Bökerhof-Ges., 1992. Online text
- Die ländliche Verfassung in den einzelnen Provinzen der preußischen Monarchie.
  - Vol. 1: Die ländliche Verfassung in den Provinzen Ost- und West-Preussen. Königsberg: Bornträger, 1839.
  - Vol. 2: Die ländliche Verfassung in der Provinz Pommern im amtl. Auftr. von Alexander Padberg. Stettin, 1861.
- Ueber den Ursprung und die Grundlagen der Verfassung in den ehemals slawischen Ländern Deutschlands im Allgemeinen und des Herzogthums Pommern im Besondern: Eine Einladungsschrift zur Erörterung und litterarischen Besprechung. Berlin: Krause, 1842.
- Die Kriegsmacht Rußlands in ihrer historischen, statistischen, ethnographischen und politischen Beziehung. Berlin: Behr, 1852.
  - Les forces militaires de la Russie sous les rapports historiques, statistiques, ethnographiques et politiques. Berlin, 1853.
- Studien über die innern Zustände, das Volksleben und insbesondere die ländlichen Einrichtungen Russlands. Hanover: Hahn, 1847–1852.
  - Etudes sur la situation intérieure, la vie nationale et les institutions rurales de la Russie. Hanover: Hahn, 1847–53.
  - The Russian Empire: Its People, Institutions and Resources. Tr. Robert Farie. Chapman and Hall, 1856; repr. London: Cass, 1968.
  - Issledovaniya vnutrennykh otnoshenii, narodnoi zhizni, i v osobennosti selskikh uchrezhdenii Rossii barona Gakstgauzena. Tr. L.I. Ragozin. Moscow, 1870.
  - Studies on the Interior of Russia. Tr. Eleanore L.M. Schmidt; ed. and intro. S. Frederick Starr. University of Chicago Press, 1972: ISBN 0-226-32022-7.
- Transkaukasia: Andeutungen über das Familien- und Gemeindeleben und die socialen Verhältnisse einiger Völker zwischen dem Schwarzen und Kaspischen Meer – Reiseerinnerungen und gesammelte Notizen. Leipzig: Brockhaus, 1856; repr. Hildesheim: Olms, 1985.
  - Transcaucasia: Sketches of the Nations and Races between the Black Sea and the Caspian. Tr. John Edward Taylor. London: Chapman and Hall, 1854.
  - The Tribes of the Caucasus, with an Account of Schamyl and the Murids. Tr. John Edward Taylor. London: Chapman and Hall, 1855.
  - Zakavkazskii Krai: Zamietki o semeinoi i obshchestvennoi zhizni i otnosheniiakh narodov, obitaiushehikh mezhdu Chernym i Kaspiiskim moriami. St. Petersburg: Tip. Glav. Shtaba Ego Imperatorskago Velichestva po Voenno-Uchebnym Zavedenīiam, 1857.
  - Transcaucasia and the Tribes of the Caucasus. Tr. John Edward Taylor; ed. and intro. Pietro A. Shakarian; fwd. Dominic Lieven. London: Gomidas Institute, 2016: ISBN 1-909-38231-0.
- Wird Rußlands Kirche das Papstthum anerkennen?: nach La Russie sera-t-elle catholique … ; nebst einem Auszug des Cardinal Baronius über den Ursprung der Russinen von Jean Gagarin. Mit einem Vorw. von August Freiherrn von Haxthausen. Münster: Theissing, 1857.
- Ein Briefwechsel im Hintergrund der russischen Bauernbefreiung 1861. Paderborn: Schöningh, 1975.
- Das constitutionelle Prinzip, seine geschichtliche Entwicklung und seine Wechselwirkungen mit den politischen und sozialen Verhältnissen der Staaten und Völker. Leipzig: Brockhaus, 1864.
- Die ländliche Verfassung Russlands, 1866.
- La question religieuse en Pologne: mémoire rédige en 1856 par feu le Baron Auguste de Haxthausen. Précédé d'une introduction et accompagné de notes par le Jean Gagarin, de la Compagnie de Jésus. Berlin: Behr, 1877.

== Bibliography ==
- August von Haxthausen, Studies on the Interior of Russia. Tr. Eleanore L.M. Schmidt; ed. and intro. S. Frederick Starr. University of Chicago Press, 1972: ISBN 0-226-32022-7.
- Bettina K. Beer, August von Haxthausen, a conservative reformer: proposals for administrative and social reform in Russia and Prussia 1829 - 1866. University Microfilms International, 1979.
- Ripley, George; Dana, Charles A., eds. (1879). "Haxthausen, Franz Ludwig Marie August" . The American Cyclopædia.
