= Wilhelm von Haxthausen =

German Marineoffizier (1874-1936)

- Born: 30 August 1874; Lauenburg in Pommern, Kingdom of Prussia
- Died: 1 March 1936 (aged 61); Kiel, Free State of Prussia, Nazi Germany
- Occupation: Admiral

Wilhelm von Haxthausen (30 August 1874 – 1 March 1936) was a German rear admiral of the Reichsmarine and longtime adjutant to Prince Adalbert of Prussia of the noble family von Haxthausen

== Life ==
Haxthausen entered the Imperial Navy on 4 April 1893 as a cadet. He completed his basic and naval training on the training ship Stosch and attended the Naval Academy in 1895/96. Promoted to Unterleutnant zur See on 14 September 1896, he served on various armored ships. With his promotion to Oberleutnant zur See, he was transferred on 3 October 1899 as a watch officer to the small cruiser Seeadler, which was deployed on station service. During the suppression of the Boxer Rebellion, the ship was assigned to the East Asia Cruiser Squadron and remained in Chinese coastal waters during that time. At the end of April 1901, Haxthausen began his return journey from China, was then placed at the disposal of the chief of the North Sea Naval Station, and at the end of September 1901 was transferred for three years as a watch officer to the Hohenzollern. In the meantime, he completed the first and second courses at the Naval Academy by 1905. On 25 May 1905, he was appointed personal adjutant to Prince Adalbert of Prussia, whom he also served as Hofmarschall (court marshal) for the duration of the First World War. On 9 December 1910, he became a Korvettenkapitän and at the same time served as a staff officer at the North Sea Naval Station.

After the end of the war, Haxthausen was released from this command in February 1916 and, from 24 April 1916 onwards a Fregattenkapitän, served as commander in Kiel. From 10 November 1918 he was briefly employed as deputy naval attaché at the German Legation in The Hague. This assignment primarily served to provide support and organizational security during the first months of the imperial family’s exile in the Netherlands. The military attaché in The Hague at that time was Erich von Müller.

From 3 February to 13 March 1919 he was at the disposal of the chief of the Baltic Sea Naval Station, and afterwards he joined the III Marine Brigade. He belonged to it until the end of February 1920, serving as a battalion commander.

Haxthausen was then taken into the Reichsmarine and briefly served as commander of the Baltic Sea Ship Cadre Division. He was granted leave for nearly three months and, on 15 June 1920, was appointed commander of the Naval Arsenal in Kiel. At times, he also served there as harbor master of Kiel and as chief of the coastal district inspection. In this position he was promoted to Kapitän zur See on 29 June 1920, with seniority dated 29 November 1919, and on 9 September 1922 to Konteradmiral, with seniority dated 1 August 1922. On 31 March 1923 he was retired from active service.

Haxthausen was a Justice Knight of the Order of Saint John. He died on 1 March 1936 in Kiel.

== Literature ==
- Dermot Bradley (Hrsg.), Hans H. Hildebrand, Ernest Henriot: Deutschlands Admirale 1849–1945. Die militärischen Werdegänge der See-, Ingenieur-, Sanitäts-, Waffen- und Verwaltungsoffiziere im Admiralsrang. Volume 2: H–O. Biblio Verlag, Osnabrück 1989, ISBN 3-7648-1499-3, S. 29 f.
- Hans Hildebrand: Formationsgeschichte und Stellenbesetzung der deutschen Streitkräfte 1915-1945. Volume 2: Marine. Biblio Verlag, Osnabrück 2000, S. 35 ff.
- Walter Riccius: Wilhelm von Haxthausen 1874–1936. In: Ders.: Die Institution der Marineattachés. Deutsche Marineattachés von Beginn bis 1945. Verlag Dr. Köster, Berlin 2023, ISBN 978-3-96831-040-4, S. 123f.
