= Welda =

- Stadtteil of Warburg
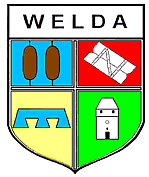
- Coat of arms

- Location in Warburg
- Interactive map of Welda
- Location within Germany Location within North Rhine-Westphalia
- Coordinates: 51°27′10″N 9°6′39″E
- Country: Germany
- State: North Rhine-Westphalia
- Admin. region: Detmold
- District: Höxter
- Town: Warburg

Area
  - Total: 9.22 km^{2} (3.56 sq mi)
- Elevation: 190 m (620 ft)

Population
  - Total: 808
  - Density: 87.6/km^{2} (227/sq mi)
- Time zone: UTC+01:00 (CET)
  - Summer (DST): UTC+02:00 (CEST)
- Postal codes: 34414
- Dialling codes: 05641

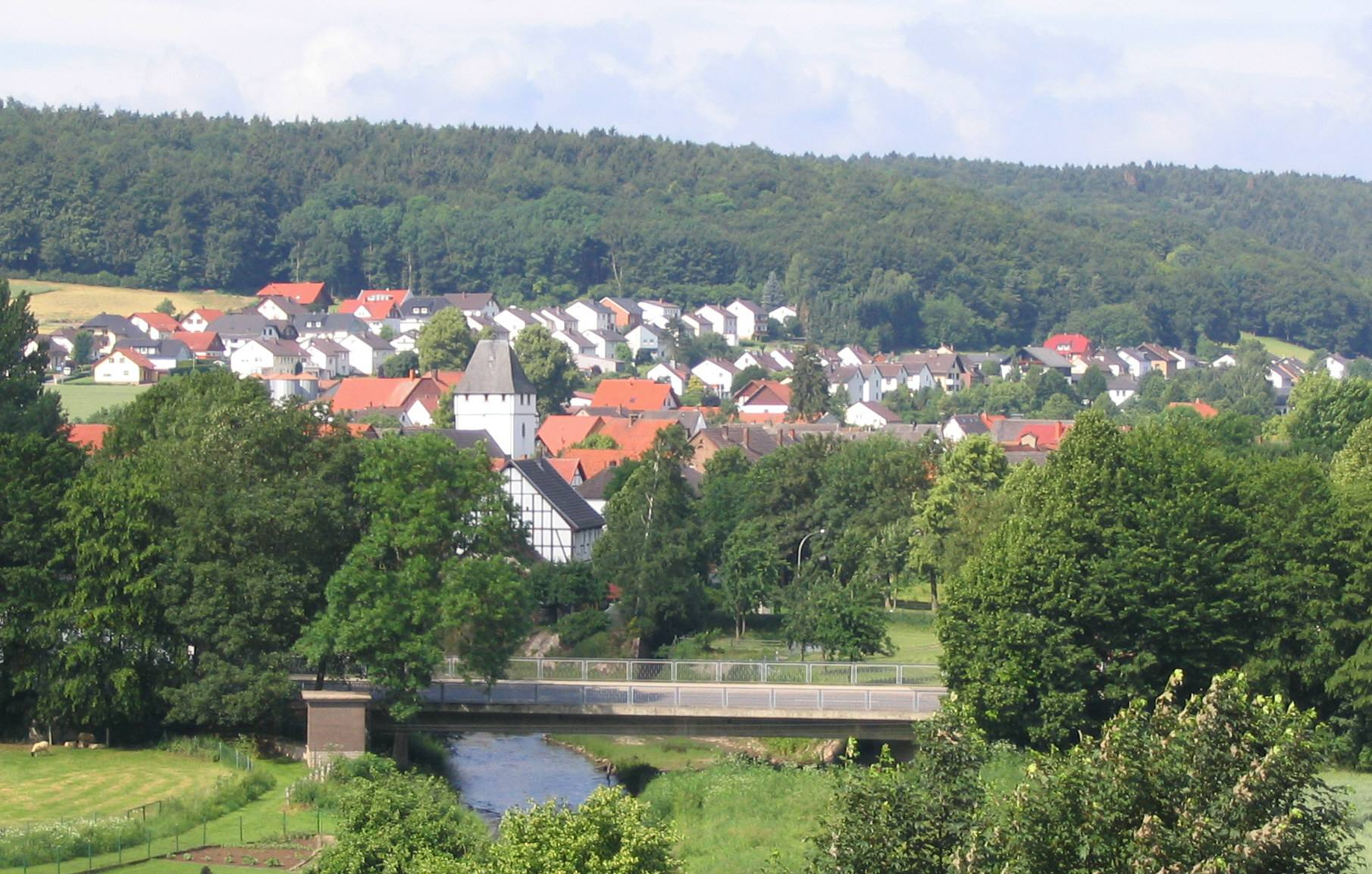
View of Welda looking west

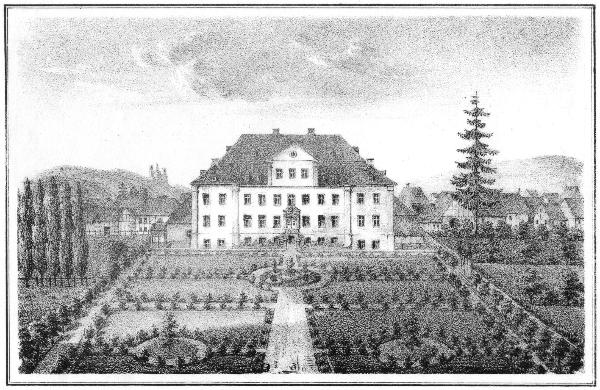
Schloss Welda in 1840

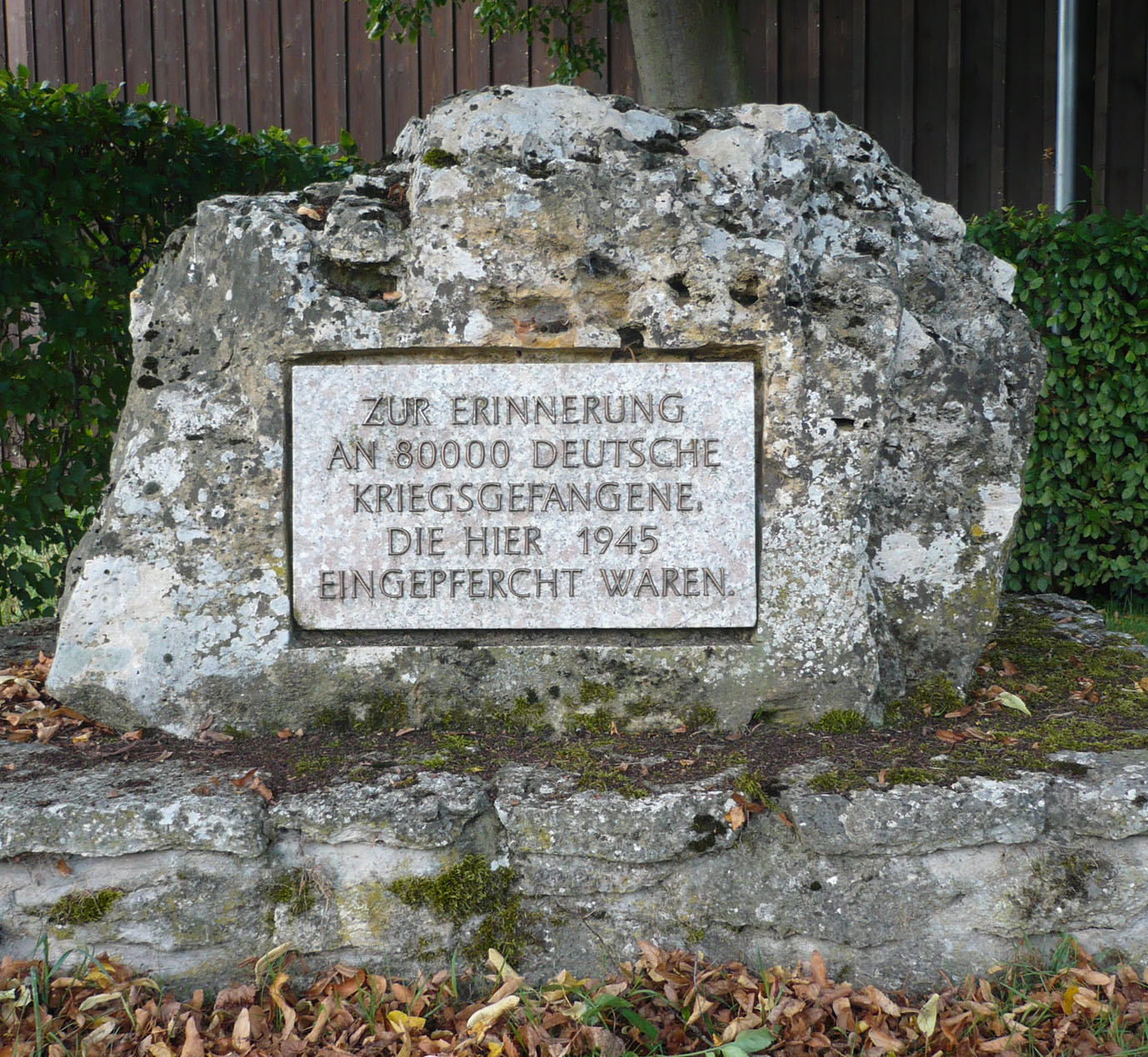
Memorial stone in Welda: "In memory of 80,000 German prisoners of war who were interned here in 1945."

Welda is a village and constituent community (stadtteil) of the town of Warburg, in the district of Höxter in the east of the federal state of North Rhine-Westphalia, Germany. Welda has historically been known by the names of Wellede, Welde and Kerkwellede.

Welda has an area of 9.22 km² and a population of 808.

== Geography ==
The village of Welda is the southernmost point of Kreis Höxter (within the administrative region of Detmold) near North Rhine-Westphalia's border with the Waldeck-Frankenberg district of the federal state of Hessen. It lies between the towns of Warburg and Volkmarsen on a line between the cities of Paderborn (40 km) and Kassel (35 km). It adjoins the Warburg communities of Calenberg, Germete and Wormeln.

Welda lies in the valley of the river Twiste which runs north into the river Diemel.

== History ==
The land around Welda, once a border village between Westphalia, Waldeck and Hesse, has yielded forth archaeological evidence of a Celtic presence.

In 1856 Welda was visited by Crown Prince Friedrich Wilhelm, who went on to become the "Ninety-Nine-Day Emperor", Kaiser Friedrich III. He presented the church with a Communion chalice.

In World War II Welda was liberated by U.S. forces in April 1945. In the fields east of the railway station there was an American internment camp holding up to 80,000 German prisoners of war.

Welda was in the British zone of occupation from 1945, then from 1949, following the political division of occupied Germany, Welda became part of the Federal Republic of West Germany until German reunification in 1990.

== Places of interest ==
- The Roman Catholic Church dedicated to Saint Kilian was founded in 1220.
- Schloss Welda was built between 1734 and 1736 by the architect Justus Wehmer who was also the architect of Hildesheim cathedral and of Schloss Vinsebeck; the architectural history and construction of the two houses are closely linked together. The Kassel baroque sculptor and artist Johann Georg Kotschau was also involved. The historic baroque park and landscape garden of Schloss Welda was created from 1738 to 1758 by the landscape architect Carl Hatzel. The garden includes an orangery which was built from 1756 to 1763. In the north part of the garden is a baroque wall that is partly fallen down. The access road from the south has an avenue of lime trees which leads to a carriage turn in front of the Schloss. Today the house is used as a registry office, for wedding receptions, and for concerts.
- The oldest existing village house (a timber-frame building) was built in 1747.
- The old mill houses a museum of village life.
- The Iron Way, an old iron ore route, now a hiking and cycling trail.

== Transport ==
In 1890, a section of the railway line from Warburg to Bad Arolsen opened with a station in the village. The railway line was closed in 1982 and converted in 1989 into a bicycle lane (R 51), part of an inter-regional cycle network. The station building was sold and is now used as a private residence.

Welda's nearest links to the national rail network are located in Warburg and Volkmarsen.

The autobahn A44 (E331) from Dortmund to Kassel runs to the north-west of Welda.

The closest regional airports are KSF Kassel-Calden (27 km) and PAD Paderborn-Lippstadt (46 km).
