= Eissen =

- Village of Willebadessen
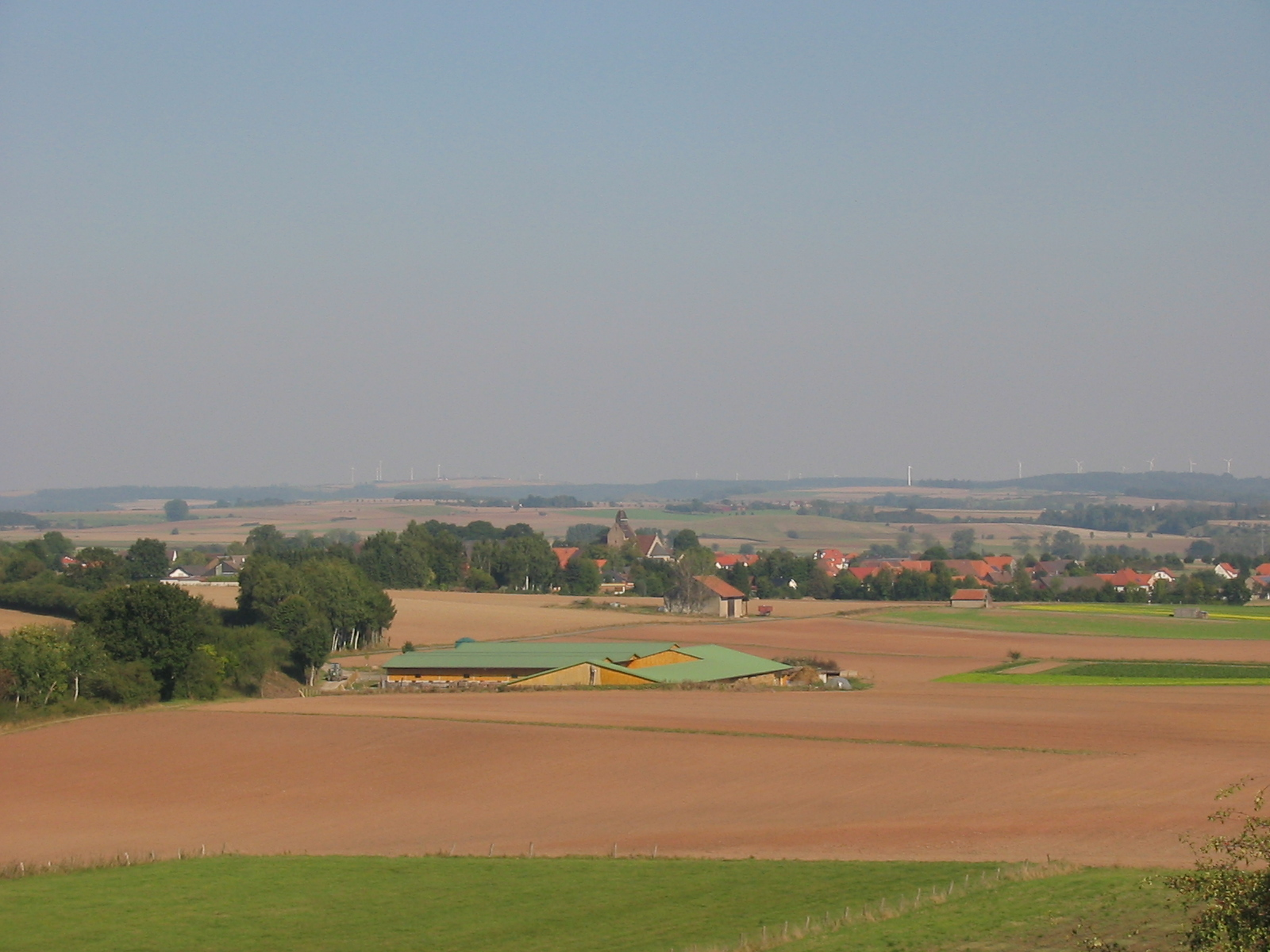
- Eissen seen from the hill Hüssenberg

- Coat of arms
- Interactive map of Eissen
- Location within Germany Location within North Rhine-Westphalia
- Coordinates: 51°34′N 9°10′E
- Country: Germany
- State: North Rhine-Westphalia
- Admin. region: Detmold
- District: Höxter
- Town: Willebadessen

Government
  - Mayor: Fritz Nutt (CDU)

Area
  - Total: 3 km^{2} (1.2 sq mi)
- Elevation: 221.4 m (726 ft)

Population (2021)
  - Total: 652
  - Density: 220/km^{2} (560/sq mi)
- Time zone: UTC+01:00 (CET)
  - Summer (DST): UTC+02:00 (CEST)
- Postal codes: 34439
- Dialling codes: 05644
- Vehicle registration: HX
- Website: eissen.huessenbergnetz.de

Eissen is a Westphalian village with 718 inhabitants in North Rhine-Westphalia and part of the town of Willebadessen, district Höxter in the administrative region of Detmold.

== Name ==
Eissen has passed through a long evolution. Starting in the early Middle Ages with Aieshusun (the ending -husun points to Saxon time) during the High Middle Ages' name Heisten to today 's form Eissen.

- Aieshusun
- (Villa) Aeissun, Agissun, Agissen
- Heisten
- Eysne, Eyessen, Eisne, Eisenen, Eyhsen, Eihsen, Eißen
- Eissen

Concerning the meaning of each name there are different theories, but none of them is proven:

- Aeissun should descend to Asigsheim. Asig should be thereby a dependence to the Germanic gods family of the Æsir, wherefore Eissen should be named as a holy place. Following this theory, the meadow name Hibbeke means Hillige-Bicke (holy bicke). Indeed, the denotation Asigsheim/Eissen was not found in any deed, although the ending -heim points to Frankish time, furthermore no archaeological evidence was found.
- In the old Saxon language Ey (Ei) denotes a place which is located in a damp and watery terrain, or rather sticks out of such a terrain as a dry landmass. Eissen is surrounded in the north by a watery terrain at the source pond / Hibbeke pond and the Siek creek, in the west by the Eggel river and in the south by the millstream. Consequently, the name could mean that Eissen sticks out of a damp and watery terrain.

== Coat of arms ==
The coat of arms was designed and introduced in 1996. Initiated by the St. Liborius Schützenverein, the coat of arms itself should integrate the so-called Taufsteinwappen, an old coat of arms on the church's baptismal font, and symbols that represent the patron Saint Liborius.

The Taufsteinwappen, placed in the bottom part's centre, is headed by the lettering "1080", because for that year a monastery farm of Corvey Abbey is proven for the first time in Eissen. The Latin words "Villa Aeissun" at the bottom belong to a deed which was written in the monastery of Helmarshausen. In this deed Eissen was mentioned. In the middle part are three green bows, which point to the chaplet of tilia which is found in front of Eissen's church.

== Geography ==
=== Geographical position ===
Eissen is located at the northern border of the Warburger Börde at a gently inclined place. While the railway station is at an altitude of 221 metres, the Eissener Höhe in the north between Peckelsheim and Eissen rises to 247 metres. To the south of the railway station the terrain falls as far as the church and further to the lower village. In the southwest a volcanic hill rises up 250 metres, the Hüssenberg.

=== Neighbouring places ===
To the northwest lies Peckelsheim, to the north Schweckhausen, Willegassen and Schönthal, to the east Borgentreich, to the southeast Lütgeneder, to the south Großender, to the southwest Engar and Deppenhöfen and to the west Löwen.

== History ==
- Between 1001 and 1010 Aieshusun is mentioned in the beneficence register of the free Reichsabtei Corvey.
- About the year 1080 a monastery farm is listed in a deed of Corvey Abbey.
- Between 1000 and 1100 a stone church was built, sanctified to Saint Liborius. This was an initiative of the diocese of Paderborn. The church became a parish church and Eissen a parish.
- 1447 Bohemian mercenaries on their way back from the siege of Soest destroyed the village Sunrike between Eissen and Borgentreich.
- 1632 troops from Hesse-Kassel (or Hesse-Cassel) marauded the area around Borgentreich and Eissen.
- 1640 the imperial main army with Archduke Leopold Wilhelm of Austria and Ottavio Piccolomini moved into wintering grounds in the Fürst-diocese of Paderborn. The result was famine, diseases, epidemics and death in the whole region.
- 1641–1647 the region around Warburg is occupied by troops from Hesse-Kassel.
- From 1756 during the Seven Years' War repeated hostilities occur in the region around Warburg.
- From December 1758 until Easter 1759 four escadrons participate in the Seven Years' War, hessian dragoons quartered in Eissen and neighbouring places.
- Between autumn 1760 and early summer 1761 42 inhabitants of Eissen (about 12% of all inhabitants) die because of the consequences of the war.
- 1812 four forced recruited inhabitants of Eissen do not come back from Russia with Napoleons "Grande Armée".
- 1871 one inhabitant does not come back from the Franco-Prussian War, three more die later, probably because of their injuries.
- From October 1, 1876, Eissen is connected by its own station on the Holzminden–Scherfede railway.
- On May 6, 1879 47 buildings in Eissen burn down within 20 minutes.
- In 1898 a kornhaus is built (similar to a granary) as a result of a Prussion law
- On December 18, 1898 41 citizens found the Eissener Spar- und Darlehnskassenverein eGmbH, which was merged in 1962 with the Spar- und Darlehnskasse Peckelsheim. 1973; it merged again with Volkbank Paderborn which closed the subsidiary in 2001.
- Between 1912 and 1914 the church was rebuilt and enlarged.
- After World War I 30 inhabitants did not return.
- After World War II 71 inhabitants did not return.
- At April 1, 1945 a German infantry company entrenched themselves at the village's southern border. Therefore, US units advancing from Hohenwepel found the village ripe for attack. The church and Kornhaus were heavily damaged, 47 properties totally destroyed. A lot of Eissen is heavily damaged but only two inhabitants are injured. 14 German and 3 American soldiers are dead, 65 soldiers of the Wehrmacht were captured, the rest dropped off along the railway to Borgholz.
- In 1975 Eissen lost its autonomy and became a part of Willebadessen. This was because of reorganisation in North Rhine-Westphalia.
- On June 2, 1984, passenger train traffic was discontinued.

=== Demographics ===
With 780 inhabitants, Eissen is the third largest locality in the municipal area of Willebadessen. In the year 1760 the population of Eissen amounted to 360 inhabitants. Between 1818 and 1890, 110 inhabitants emigrated, most of them to the United States of America and the United Kingdom of Great Britain and Ireland, but also to Sweden and the Caribbean.

=== Religion ===
The biggest religion is the Catholic Church of St. Liborius, counting 649 members, which belongs to the parish cluster Willebadessen-Peckelsheim. The church is part of the deanery Höxter in the Archdiocese of Paderborn. The Lutherans belongs to the Lutheran Church of Peckelsheim.

== Politics ==
Since the rearrangement of the townships in North Rhine-Westphalia in 1975, Eissen is no more an independent community. Eissen now belongs to the municipal area of Willebadessen and is represented on city council by one direct member. Since the last local election in September 2004, three people from Eissen are members of the city council (CDU: 2, SPD:1).

== Economy and Infrastructure ==
=== Economy ===
Eissen is agricultural and craftsmanship. In the village there are some small craftmans' establishments, service companies and businesses concerning the fields of metal working, construction, wood and food. Located at the edge of the fertile plain "Warburger Börde", in relation to other German regions, farming has a slightly major role, but concentration in this sector is also ongoing. Organic farming has a superior quota of the farmed cropland and provides additional jobs in labour-intensive areas.

Many of the Eisseners are working in the cities Warburg, Brakel, Höxter and Beverungen.

=== Transportation ===
Via the state route L763 toward Peckelsheim, Eissen is connected to federal route B 252. In the other direction, the L763 leads to Borgentreich, where access is provided to the B 241. Warburg station and Paderborn Central Station are served by Intercity services, Willebadessen and Brakel station are served by Regionalbahn trains. Paderborn Lippstadt Airport is 50 km distant.

== Culture and sights ==
=== Regular Events ===
- Easter fire on Holy Saturday by the KLJB
- Sports meeting by the sport club SV Germania Eissen 1920 e. V. at the beginning of May
- Schützenfest by the St. Liborius-Schützenverein Eissen at the third weekend of July
- Hüssenbergparty by the KLJB in the middle of August

=== Clubs ===
- Rambling Club EGV-Wanderverein Eissen, founded 1986
- Parents' initiative Hüssenbergnest e. V. founded 1993
- Catholic Women Community of Germany / Katholische Frauengemeinschaft Deutschlands (kfd) Eissen, yore club of mothers / Mütterverein, founded c. 1930
- Volunteer fire department Eissen, founded 1911
- Choral society Eintracht Eissen, founded 1893, disbanded 1953, refounded 1989
- KLJB Eissen, founded 1953, refounded 1967
- Motorcycle friends Eissen
- Sports club SV Germania Eissen 1920 e. V., founded 1920
- Tennis club TC Blau Weiß Eissen, founded 1976
- Carnival club VEK - Vereinigte Eissener Karnevalisten, founded 1984, resolved 2005
- St. Liborius Schützenverein Eissen, founded 1953

== Literature ==
Aieshusun - Aeissun - Eysnen - Eissen Bild unserer Heimat, Released by St. Liborius-Schützenverein Eissen Selbstverlag/NEWSPOINT-Medienservice Uwe Rottkamp, Bad Salzuflen 2003
