= Marienmünster =

- Town
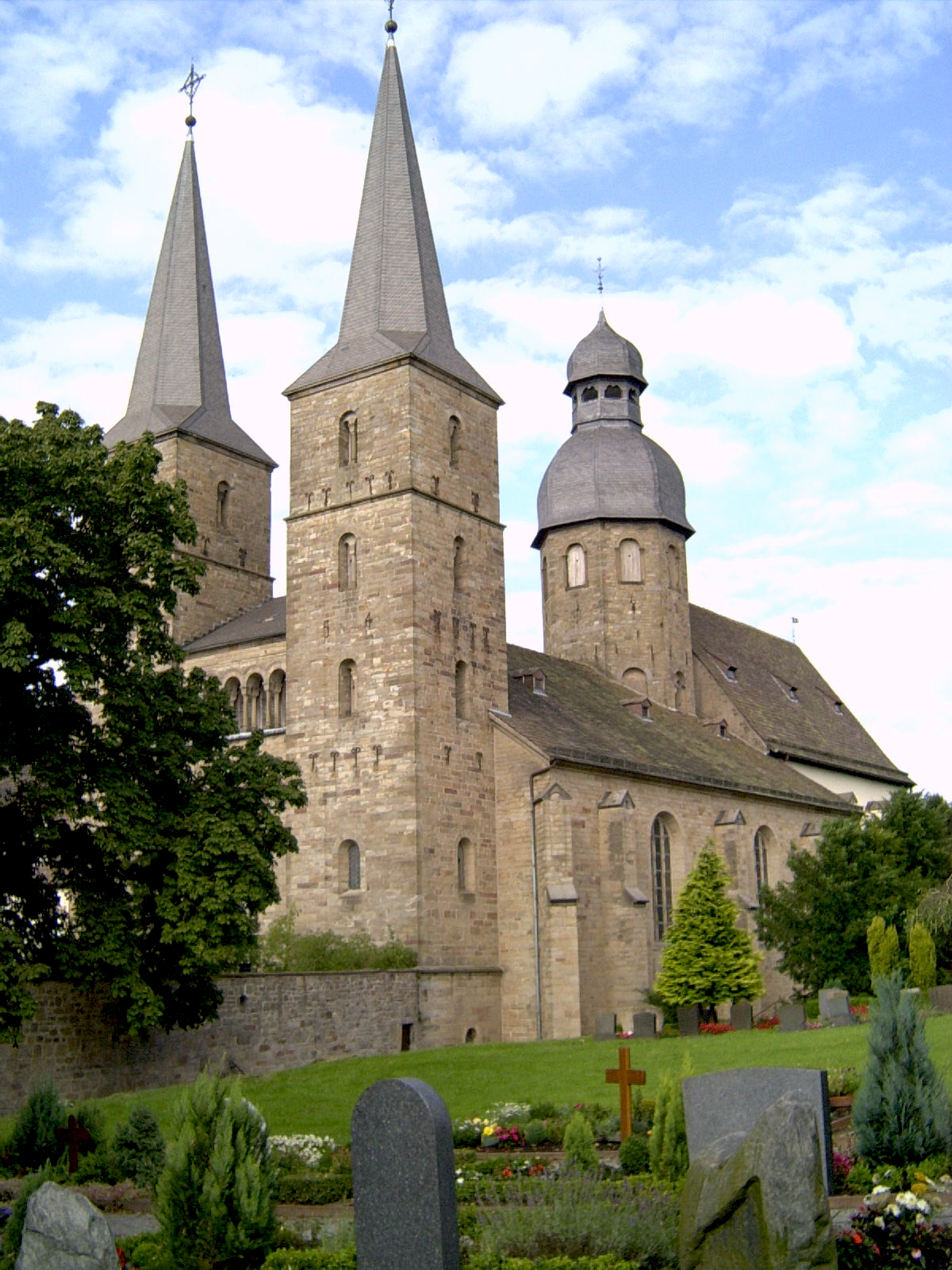
- Former abbey church

- Flag Coat of arms

- Location of Marienmünster within Höxter district
- Interactive map of Marienmünster
- Location within Germany Location within North Rhine-Westphalia
- Coordinates: 51°49′00″N 09°10′59″E
- Country: Germany
- State: North Rhine-Westphalia
- Admin. region: Detmold
- District: Höxter
- Subdivisions: 13

Government
  - Mayor (2020–25): Josef Suermann (Ind.)

Area
  - Total: 64.36 km^{2} (24.85 sq mi)
- Elevation: 257 m (843 ft)

Population (2025-12-31)
  - Total: 4,758
  - Density: 73.93/km^{2} (191.5/sq mi)
- Time zone: UTC+01:00 (CET)
  - Summer (DST): UTC+02:00 (CEST)
- Postal codes: 37696
- Dialling codes: 05276
- Vehicle registration: HX
- Website: www.marienmuenster.de

Marienmünster (German pronunciation: [maˌʁiːənˈmʏnstɐ]) is a town in Höxter district in North Rhine-Westphalia, Germany.

== Geography ==
=== Location ===
Marienmünster is North Rhine-Westphalia's smallest municipality by land area. It lies in the Weserbergland, in the state's easternmost district, about 15 km north of Brakel.

=== Neighbouring communities ===
Clockwise from the north, Marienmünster's neighbours are:

- The Town of Schieder-Schwalenberg, Lippe district;
- The Town of Höxter, Höxter district;
- The Town of Brakel, Höxter district;
- The Town of Nieheim, Höxter district;
- The Town of Steinheim, Höxter district.

=== Constituent communities ===
Marienmünster consists of the following centres:

- Altenbergen – 519 inhabitants
- Born – 100 inhabitants
- Bremerberg – 122 inhabitants
- Bredenborn – 1,603 inhabitants
- Eilversen – 84 inhabitants
- Großenbreden – 103 inhabitants
- Hohehaus – 206 inhabitants
- Kleinenbreden – 126 inhabitants
- Kollerbeck with the farming community of Langenkamp – 778 inhabitants
- Löwendorf with the farming community of Saumer – 267 inhabitants
- Münsterbrock with the former abbey and the farming community of Oldenburg – 131 inhabitants
- Papenhöfen with the farming community of Bönekenberg – 234 inhabitants
- Vörden – 1,337 inhabitants

=== Climate ===
Marienmünster-Vörden's bioclimate and the surrounding area's displays a number of factors of varying intensity that make it quite agreeable and restful, giving the area the proper preconditions for using the climate in therapy. This goes for all times of year other than the winter months, when cold, dry weather takes hold under the influence of Continental systems, and the Weserbergland, Teutoburg Forest and Eggegebirge have their heights covered in snow.

== History ==
The town of Marienmünster was established on 1 January 1970 through the merger of the previously independent municipalities of Bredenborn, Vörden (both towns), Altenbergen, Born, Bremerberg, Eilversen, Großenbreden, Hohehaus, Kleinenbreden, Kollerbeck with Langenkamp, Löwendorf with Saumer, Münsterbrock with Abtei, Oldenburg, and Papenhöfen with Bönekenberg. The town's administrative centre is located in Vörden.

=== Großenbreden ===
Between the Oldenburg and Vörden, the Münsterholze, the Hungerberg and Löwendorf lay until the first half of the 16th century a town named Wendedhen (1188), Winethe (1203), Winethen (1240), Wenethen (1241), Wenden (1430). The monks from Marienmünster earned their tithes from this town.

According to the registers of the Corvey Monastery, the town was mentioned as early as 980 under the name "Wynithun". In the 16th century, the three villages of Großenbreden (Wendenbreden 1541, Wendelbreden 1650, Großenwendelbreden 1793), Kleinenbreden (Lütkenbreden 1650, Lükewendelbreden 1793) and Papenhöfen (earlier die Höfe zu Wenden 1545) developed. The farming community of Bönekenberg, belonging to Papenhöfen, was described as a settlement beginning in 1430. Settlement was established in the 16th century on the site of the failed village of Mechtestorpe (1138) or Mestorp (1339), where in the 9th and 10th centuries, the Corvey Monastery already had holdings.

=== Hohehaus ===
Hohehaus's history can be traced back to the earlier village of Dungen, which was named as early as 825 or thereabouts in the Corvey Traditions, the monastery's donation registers. The Corvey Monastery received at that time several donations and owned a main farm of 22 Hufen here. Besides Corvey, the Marienmünster Abbey must have been working holdings here quite early on, too, since in 1339, Abbot Hermann von Mengersen surrendered half his earnings from the place to the Counts, the Lord of Everstein and his son Otto, to protect and defend the Abbey's holdings for six years. In 1360, evidence shows that the Corvey estates along with the ecclesiastical fief, passed into Count Hermann von Pyrmont's hands. He in turn passed them as a direct fief to the von Kanne family.

There arose in the 16th century between the Count of Pyrmont and the Corvey Monastery a boundary dispute that on 15 June 1535 was arbitrated to the effect that Dungen passed to the von Kanne family. In 1595, Dungen was still called a village. In a document from 1602, a new placename crops up, rendered "Dungen, itzo dat Hagehauß", archaic German for "Dungen, the house in the forest". Later, this was shortened to "Hagehaus", and by 1660, the current form "Hohehaus" had arisen.

== Population ==
Historical population

Year	Pop.	±% p.a.
1965	4,574	—
1970	4,736	+0.70%
1975	4,994	+1.07%
1980	4,987	−0.03%
1985	5,004	+0.07%
1990	5,145	+0.56%
1995	5,233	+0.34%

Year	Pop.	±% p.a.
2000	5,505	+1.02%
2005	5,516	+0.04%
2010	5,289	−0.84%
2015	5,125	−0.63%
2020	4,903	−0.88%
2025	4,758	−0.60%

Source: Landesdatabank Nordrhein-Westfalen

== Politics ==
=== Town council ===
Town council's 22 seats are apportioned as follows, in accordance with municipal elections held on 26 September 2004:

- CDU 12 seats
- SPD 3 seats
- UWG 4 seats
- Wähler Gemeinschaft Bürgernähe: 3 seats

Note: The last two named are citizens' coalitions.

=== Coat of arms ===
Marienmünster's civic coat of arms might heraldically be described thus: In argent an abbey gules with two side towers gules with pointed roofs sable and between these and behind the abbey a tower gules with cupola sable, on the abbey wall between the side towers an eight-pointed star Or.

The abbey in the arms is a stylized representation of the west façade of the Marienmünster abbey church established by Count Widukind III of Schwalenberg in 1128. Its meaning in relation to the town is therefore quite visible even today as a unifying symbol of town, people and church. The star is from the Schwalenberg family's arms.

This coat of arms was conferred on 25 July 1973.

=== Flag ===
The town's flag is striped red and white lengthwise with the coat of arms in the middle.

== Culture and sightseeing ==
=== Museums ===
- Aussichts- und Museumsturm (look-out and museum-tower). It is located next to the Hungerbergkapelle (see below) and recalls station no. 30 of the optical telegraph-line from Berlin to Koblenz.

=== Buildings ===
- Marienmünster is well known for the Abteikirche Marienmünster, the former Marienmünster Abbey, with its organ, which is well worth seeing and hearing.
- Schloss Vörden is a Baroque stately home with a lovely park.
- The Hungerbergkapelle (chapel) is part of a complete Way of the Cross with 14 stations.
- Mühlengrund in Hohehaus.

== Economy and infrastructure ==
=== Tourism ===
The town of Marienmünster has a well-developed tourism industry. The community of Vörden was dubbed "State-recognized climatic spa" in 1999. In 2019 Rock N revel festival began in the village of Altenbergen, bringing international artists such as Phil Campbell and the Bastard Sons, Massive (band) and H.E.A.T (band) to the area.

=== Education ===
In Marienmünster are three primary schools and a Hauptschule. Students who go to Realschulen and Gymnasien are driven by bus to nearby towns such as Bad Driburg, Höxter, Steinheim and Brakel.

The schools in Marienmünster are:

- Katholische Grundschule Bredenborn
- Grundschule Kollerbeck
- Grundschule Vörden
- Hauptschule der Stadt Marienmünster (Vörden)

Furthermore, the town of Marienmünster, together with the town of Höxter, runs the Höxter-Marienmünster Volkshochschule. Marienmünster also has two municipal kindergartens, and in Bredenborn a church kindergarten.

=== Sport and leisure ===
- 1 indoor swimming pool in Vörden
- 3 tennis grounds (in Bredenborn, Kollerbeck and Vörden)
- 7 sports grounds
- 3 Kneipp wading pools
- 29 children's playgrounds
- 1 adventure playground in Vörden
- 1 miniature golf course in Vörden
- 3 gymnasia in Bredenborn (big triple hall), Kollerbeck and Vörden
