= Holzminden–Scherfede railway =

Overview
- Line number: 2973
- Locale: North Rhine-Westphalia, Germany

Service
- Route number: ex 249

Technical
- Line length: 49.2 km (30.6 mi)
- Track gauge: 1,435 mm (4 ft 8 1/2 in) standard gauge
- Operating speed: 100 km/h (62 mph) (maximum)

The Holzminden–Scherfede railway was a 49 km long main line from Holzminden to Scherfede (now part of Warburg) in the German state of North Rhine-Westphalia that connected the Altenbeken–Kreiensen railway with the Upper Ruhr Valley Railway. It ran continuously from 1876 to 1984. The most important town on the former line was Beverungen.

== Route ==
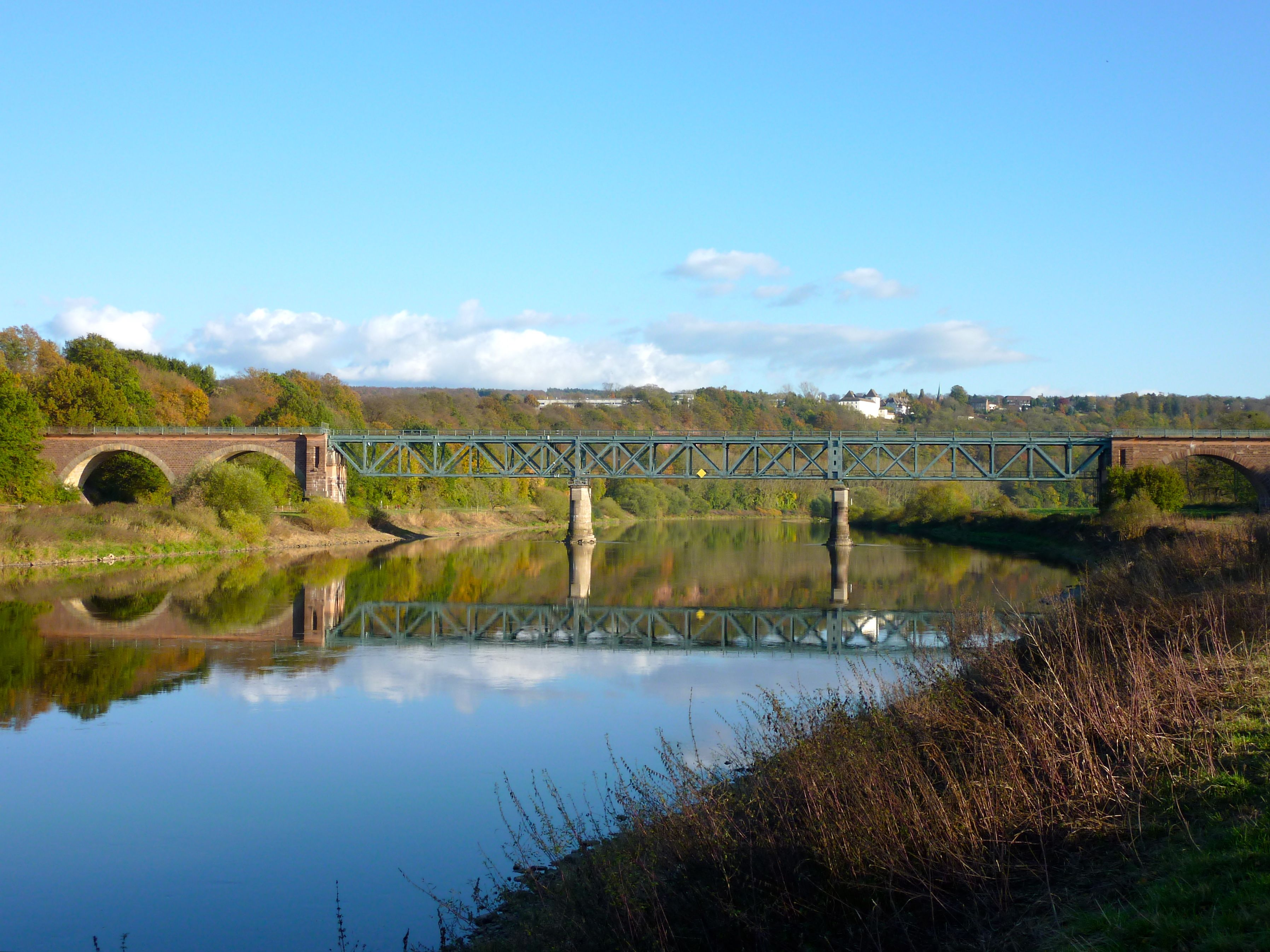
Weser bridge at Fürstenberg, near track km 322.0

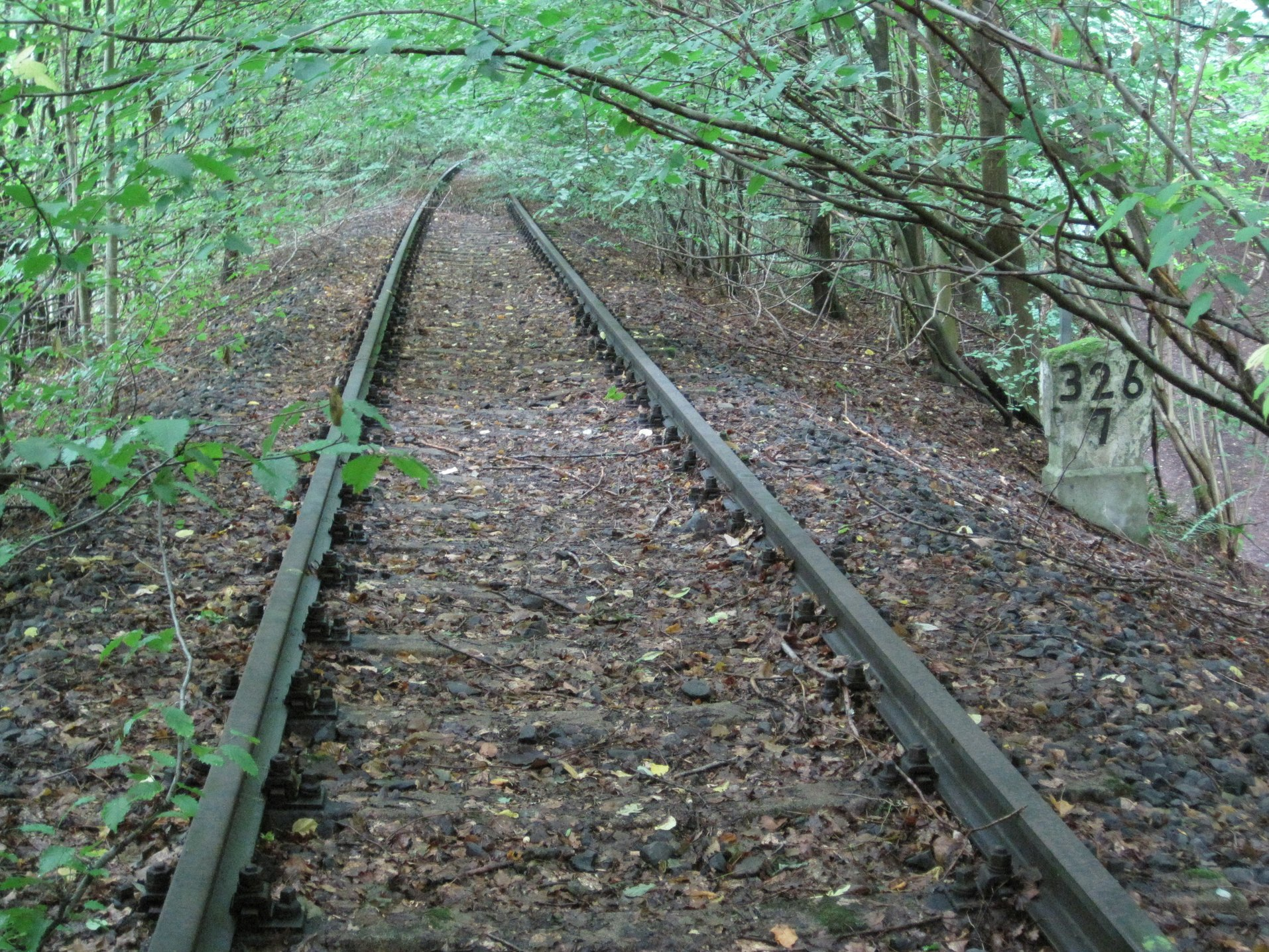
Track km 326.7 in August 2011

The line ran from the northeast to the southwest through the Weser Uplands. It crossed the Weser at Fürstenberg. In Wehrden it connected with the Solling Railway (but only towards Northeim), which it crossed just after Wehrden station. The line ran through Beverungen, from where it climbed up the valley of the Bever and through the Warburger Börde (the rolling country around Warburg). In Nörde the line passed under the Hamm–Warburg railway. The line reached the Upper Ruhr Valley Railway in Scherfede, which is in the valley of the Diemel.

== History ==
The route was developed by the Bergisch-Märkische Railway Company (Bergisch-Märkische Eisenbahn-Gesellschaft, BME) to connect the Upper Ruhr Valley Railway to the east independent of the Prussian state railways. This provided a link to Holzminden, because from there it could connect to the network of the former Duchy of Brunswick State Railway via Kreiensen, Salzgitter-Ringelsheim and Jerxheim either to the Magdeburg–Thale railway of the Magdeburg–Halberstadt Railway Company (Magdeburg-Halberstädter Eisenbahngesellschaft, MHE) in Oschersleben or to the Brunswick–Magdeburg railway of the Berlin-Potsdam Railway Company (Berlin-Potsdamer Eisenbahn, BPE) in Schoningen. The line would be used by coal trains and express passenger trains. Local issues played no role in the choice of route. In the Warburger Börde, it bypassed the larger resorts such as Borgentreich and Warburg. The Duchy of Brunswick had privatised its former state railways in 1870 and the BME and the BPE had acquired shares. Even before the completion of the Upper Ruhr Valley Railway in 1873, construction work began in 1872 to close the last gap in a private rail network from the Rhine to the Spree. The first traffic ran over it on 15 October 1876. At the end of 1876, a pair expresses ran between Berlin and Aachen. A year later, a luxury train ran to Paris and Ostend.

Meanwhile, support for a state railway prevailed in Prussia from 1879/80 and the lines of the BME were incorporated into the Prussian state railways in 1882. The Holzminden-Scherfede line was just a bit inconveniently near main lines, connected two steep lines and lay obliquely to the direction of the main traffic flows. The line bypassed Höxter and Warburg and was thus unsuitable for regional traffic. The long-distance trains ran over the line through Altenbeken. It was not until 1900, when traffic had grown substantially, that a pair of Durchgangszug (D-Zug, “corridor express train”) was established between Berlin and Cologne. The line was duplicated in 1907. A connecting curve was built in Nörde that allowed trains to be diverted by the Holzminden–Nörde–Altenbeken (–Soest route).

After the Second World War, the section from Holzminden to Wehrden had a final period of prosperity as the Weser bridge on the Altenbeken–Kreiensen railway at Corvey had been destroyed. A connecting curve (Engländerkurve, literally "Englishman curve") was built northwest of Wehrden that allowed operations from Holzminden to Altenbeken over the Weser river-crossing bridge at Fürstenberg. From 1954, this was no longer necessary. The line declined to become a regional line, although until the end it was used by a D-Zug operated on the Aachen–Holzminden–Braunschweig route. It was frequently used until the early 1990s for the transfer of vehicles and tanks of the NATO forces. The British Army of the Rhine was responsible for the maintenance of the Fürstenberg bridge. Passenger traffic ended on 2 June 1984. Freight traffic was discontinued in sections from 1984 to 2001: between Beverungen and Borgholz on 30 May 1984; between Fürstenberg and Beverungen on 31 May 1988; between Holzminden and Fürstenberg and between Borgholz and Nörde on 31 May 1992 and between Nörde and Scherfede on 10 June 2001.

== Current situation ==
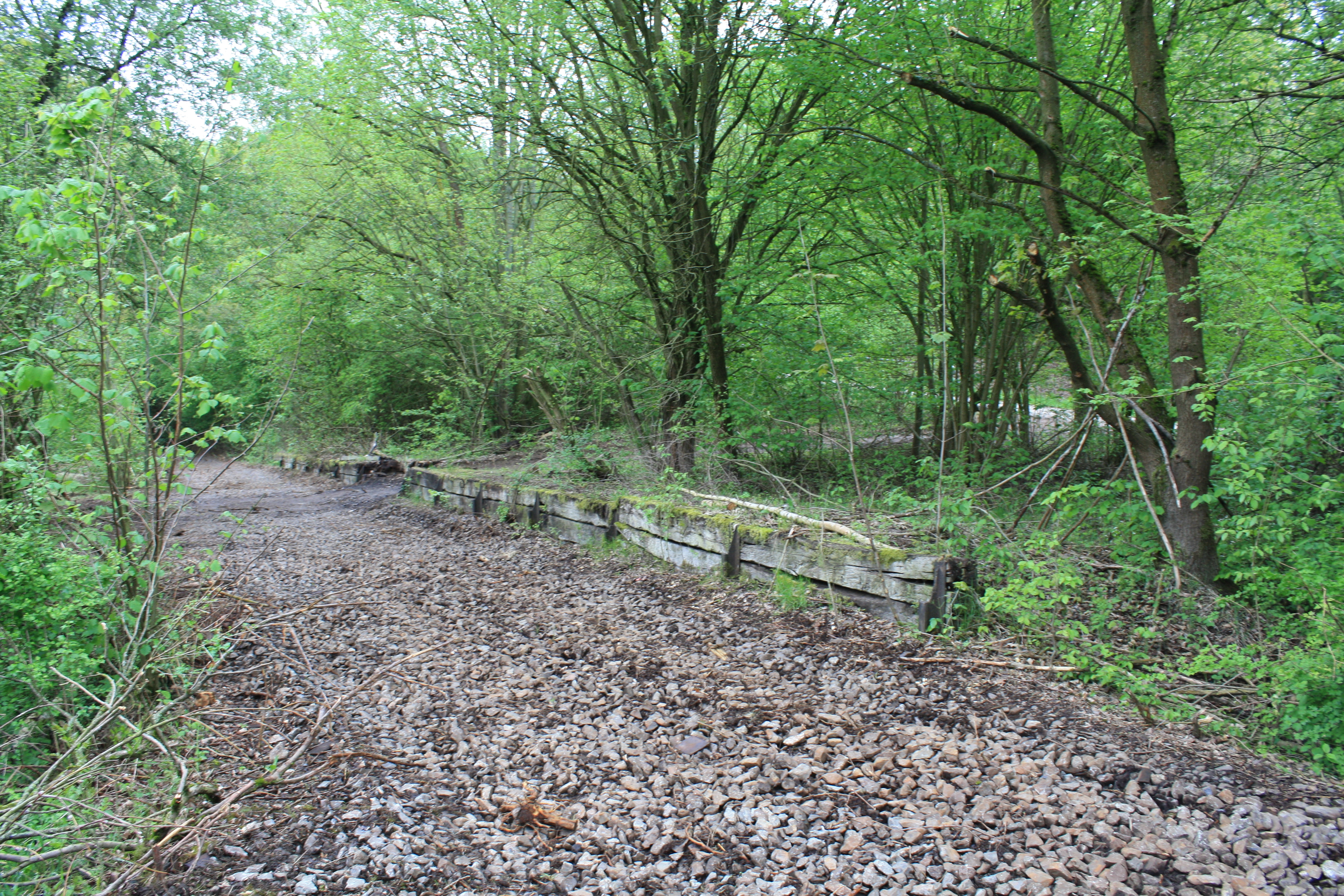
Demolished Dalhausen-Biesberg station. The tracks have been removed and to the right is a temporary track to district road 44, which is about 10 metres away, for heavy demolition equipment. The platform is still recognisable.

The railway line is now largely in place, but except in Scherfede it is no longer connected to the other lines and is impassable. The Bahnflächenentwicklungsgesellschaft (“railway land development company”) NRW (BEG), a joint venture of North Rhine-Westphalia and Deutsche Bahn plans, however, the partial removal of the disused line and its conversion into a cycle path. Planned sections cover a total of 22.3 km of the former line:

- Project Höxter: a new municipal cycle path between Lüchtringen and Godelheim: 3.1 km for €611,000. The municipality of Höxter has been hesitant to support the state project because the municipality would be obliged to co-finance it and the Weser cycle path already runs nearby. It would primarily benefit the Höxter district of Lüchtringen and the town of Boffzen in Lower Saxony. The route would also have its own bridge over the Weser to allow cyclists to cross between Fürstenberg and Godelheim.
- Project Beverungen: the section between Blankenau and Dalhausen covers 11.2 km and would be developed for approximately €1.89 million.
- Project Borgentreich: in the town of Borgentreich at Natzungen and Borgholz, 9.1 kilometers of tracks are to be lifted and the route would be paved for cyclists. The estimated cost amounts to €1.4 million.

The towns of Warburg (the Rimbeck–Nörde section) and Willebadessen (the Eissen section) have applied for a share of the state program only once for financial reasons.
