= Dössel =

- Stadtteil of Warburg
- Location of Dössel within Warburg
- Interactive map of Dössel
- Location within Germany Location within North Rhine-Westphalia
- Coordinates: 51°31′23″N 9°9′55″E
- Country: Germany
- State: North Rhine-Westphalia
- Admin. region: Detmold
- District: Höxter
- Town: Warburg

Population
  - Total: 682
- Time zone: UTC+01:00 (CET)
  - Summer (DST): UTC+02:00 (CEST)
- Postal codes: 34414
- Dialling codes: 05641

Dössel is a village and constituent community (stadtteil) of the town of Warburg, in the district of Höxter in the east of the federal state of North Rhine-Westphalia, Germany. Dössel has historically been known by the names of Dosele and Dozele.

Dössel has a population of 682.

== Geography ==
The village of Dössel is in the north-east of Kreis Höxter (within the administrative region of Detmold), north of central Warburg and south of the adjacent municipality of Borgentreich. The nearest cities are Paderborn and Kassel. It adjoins the Warburg communities of Daseburg, Hohenwepel and central Warburg.

== History ==
The first reference to the village was in 1200 in the agricultural register of Corvey Abbey. In 1975 the village was incorporated into the municipality of Warburg.

In World War II a site 5 km (3.1 mi) south-west of Dössel was the location of prisoner of war camp Oflag VI-B (also known as Warburg-Dössel), famous for the 1942 mass escape known as the "Warburg Wire Job". On the night of 27 September 1944, British bombers aiming at the railway junction in Nörde mistakenly dropped bombs on the camp, killing 90 officers. Altogether 141 prisoners died in Oflag VI-B. They are buried in the cemetery near the centre of the town and a memorial was erected in 1980.

Dössel was liberated by U.S. forces in April 1945. It was in the British zone of occupation from 1945, then from 1949, following the political division of occupied Germany, Dössel became part of the Federal Republic of West Germany until German reunification in 1990.

== Transport ==
Dössel's nearest links to the national rail network are located in Warburg and Volkmarsen.

The autobahn A44 (E331) from Dortmund to Kassel runs to the south-east of Dössel.

The closest regional airports are KSF Kassel-Calden (27 km) and PAD Paderborn-Lippstadt (46 km).

== Notable people from Dössel ==
- Paul Mohr (born 1936), CDU politician.
