= Fölsen =

- Stadtteil of Willebadessen
- Location of Fölsen within Willebadessen
- Interactive map of Fölsen
- Location within Germany Location within North Rhine-Westphalia
- Coordinates: 51°37′N 9°05′E
- Country: Germany
- State: North Rhine-Westphalia
- Admin. region: Detmold
- District: Höxter
- Town: Willebadessen

Population (2021)
  - Total: 214
- Time zone: UTC+01:00 (CET)
  - Summer (DST): UTC+02:00 (CEST)

Fölsen is a small village in North Rhine-Westphalia, Germany with about 200 inhabitants. It is part of the town Willebadessen.

== Location ==
Fölsen is located in one of the sidevalleys of the river Nethe.

== Attractions ==
Fölsen is the head church of Niesen and Helmern. It has a small pub, located at the village square, as well as a historic church. The village features a fully operational volunteer fire brigade, which was to get a new Mercedes-Benz firetruck in 2008, replacing their old 1983 Ford Transit.

== Recreation ==
Fölsen has a lot of different clubs and associations:

- SV Fölsen (sports club)
- FFW Fölsen (voluntary fire brigade)
- KLJB Fölsen (youth organisation)
- Männergesangsverein (male choral society)
- Blaubären Fölsen (fan club of the Bundesliga soccer team Schalke 04)
- Schnakkencrew (a not registered syndicate)
- Männerstammtisch (a not registered syndicate)
