= Bühne (Borgentreich) =

- Stadtteil of Borgentreich
- Location of Bühne within the town of Borgentreich
- Interactive map of Bühne
- Location within Germany Location within North Rhine-Westphalia
- Coordinates: 51°34′30″N 09°18′26″E
- Country: Germany
- State: North Rhine-Westphalia
- District: Höxter
- Town: Borgentreich

Area
  - Total: 23.48 km^{2} (9.07 sq mi)

Population
  - Total: 1,258
  - Density: 53.58/km^{2} (138.8/sq mi)
- Time zone: UTC+01:00 (CET)
  - Summer (DST): UTC+02:00 (CEST)
- Postal codes: 34434
- Dialling codes: 05643

Bühne is a village and constituent community (Stadtteil) of the East Westphalian town Borgentreich in Höxter district and Detmold region in North Rhine-Westphalia, Germany. Bühne has approximately 1,200 inhabitants. With 23 km^{2} it is the second largest constituent community of Borgentreich.

== History ==
Bühne was first mentioned in a document around 850 under the name Piun. It was one of the fortified castles of the nobility of the Prince-Bishopric of Paderborn. Piun is a Bavarian dialect version of Bühne that was used by the author of that document, the head of administration of King Arnulf.

On 1 January 1975, Bühne was integrated into the city of Borgentreich as a constituent community.
