= Willebadessen =

- Town
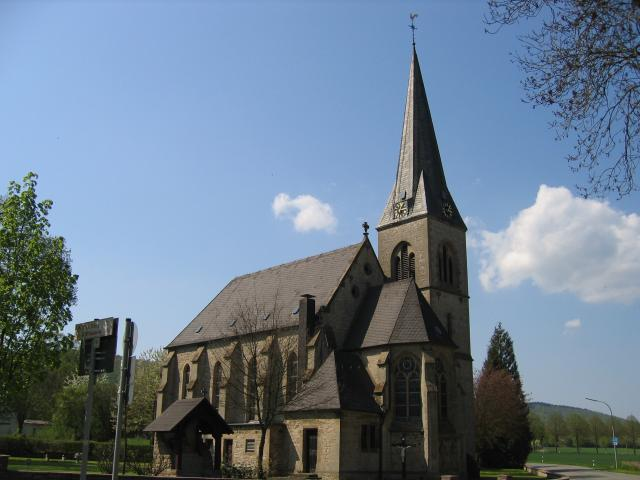
- Church of Saint Mary Help of the Christians

- Coat of arms

- Location of Willebadessen within Höxter district
- Interactive map of Willebadessen
- Location within Germany Location within North Rhine-Westphalia
- Coordinates: 51°38′N 09°02′E
- Country: Germany
- State: North Rhine-Westphalia
- Admin. region: Detmold
- District: Höxter
- Subdivisions: 13

Government
  - Mayor (2020–25): Norbert Hofnagel (CDU)

Area
  - Total: 128.41 km^{2} (49.58 sq mi)
- Elevation: 295 m (968 ft)

Population (2025-12-31)
  - Total: 8,172
  - Density: 63.64/km^{2} (164.8/sq mi)
- Time zone: UTC+01:00 (CET)
  - Summer (DST): UTC+02:00 (CEST)
- Postal codes: 34435, 34437 34439
- Dialling codes: 05644, 05642, 05646
- Vehicle registration: HX
- Website: www.willebadessen.de

Willebadessen (German pronunciation: [ˈvɪləbaːtˌʔɛsn̩]) is a town in Höxter district and Detmold region in North Rhine-Westphalia, Germany.

== Geography ==
=== Location ===
Willebadessen lies on the eastern edge of the Eggegebirge (the southern extension of the Teutoburg Forest) about 25 km southeast of Paderborn, and is crossed by the little river Nethe, which rises in the neighbouring community of Bad Driburg-Neuenheerse, emptying eventually into the Weser near Höxter-Godelheim.

=== Constituent communities ===
- Altenheerse
- Borlinghausen
- Eissen
- Engar
- Fölsen
- Helmern
- Ikenhausen
- Löwen
- Niesen
- Peckelsheim
- Schweckhausen
- Willebadessen
- Willegassen

== History ==
=== Borlinghausen ===
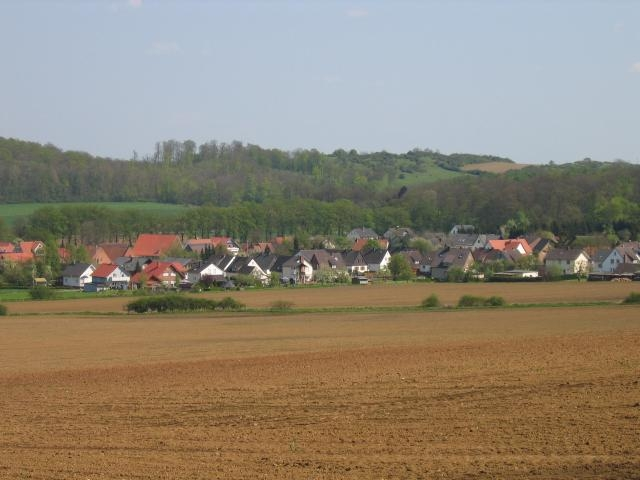
Borlinghausen seen from the Eggegebirge

Borlinghausen was first mentioned in a document on 8 December 1065 under the name Burchartinchusen in German King, later Emperor, Henry IV's (1050–1106) time, which was also marked by his "Walk to Canossa" in 1077. In the aforesaid year, Henry donated to his old teacher, the Archbishop Adalbert of Hamburg-Bremen, a forested lordly estate in the gau of Engern. The document in question laid out the boundaries of the estate in question quite thoroughly, mentioning several local centres, including Burchartinchusen.

It is believed that the village's founder was a man named Burchard, since its name would seem to be Old High German for "at Burchard's houses".

Over the centuries, the village has undergone several name changes: Burchartinghusen (1102), Burchardinchuson (1120), Borgardinchusen (1232), Borninghusen (1584), Bornighusen, Borlinghusen, and finally Borlinghausen, locally pronounced "Burnechousen".

Borlinghausen's beginnings were sometime before the first documentary mention, in Saxon times between 500 and 800, at which time it formed the western part of the "Mark Löwen". It was in this time that most places with names ending in —hausen came into being. The Mark Löwen in turn belonged to the Hessian-Saxon Gau.

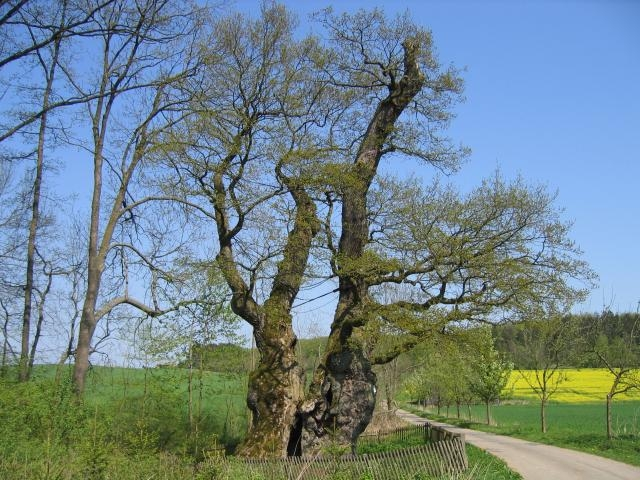
Giant thousand-year-old oak

Emperor Charlemagne conquered the Duchy of Saxony in the years 772 to 804. The Gaue (roughly, regions) that had been in force until then were each placed under a count and were thereafter known as counties (Grafschaften). The Emperor demanded suzerainty over the marches, and the counts' power grew ever greater with their burdens. Charlemagne forced the Saxons, under threat of death, to convert to Christianity and have themselves baptized.

For 800 years, Borlinghausen was part of the Prince-Bishopric of Paderborn after Count Dodiko of Warburg donated his estate to Bishop Meinwerk of Paderborn about 1000. This only ended with Prussian secularization in 1803.

In 1376, a knight from Epe held the Borlinghausen estate as a fief from the Counts of Waldeck.

In 1411, after the lordly Spiegel family's Borlinghausen line had died out, the Counts of Waldeck handed the fief to their kin, Gerd von Spiegel zu Peckelsheim, including the village, the castle and the church fief.

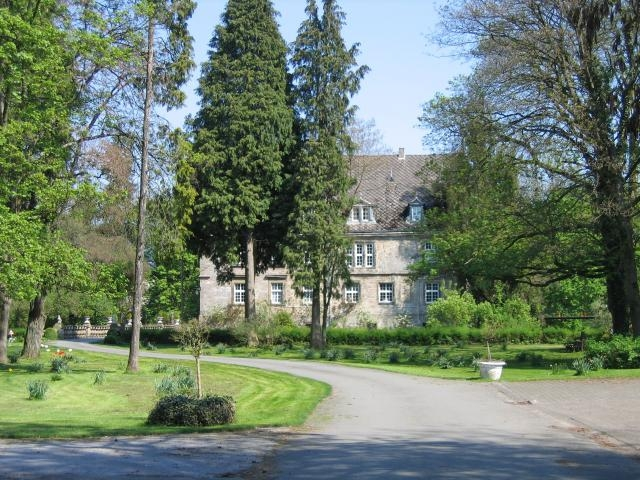
Wasserschloss Borlinghausen

Johann von Spiegel zu Peckelsheim, after his death in 1559, bequeathed his estate to his four sons Georg, Werner, Raban and David. This included Schweckhausen, Borlinghausen, Holtheim and Ikenhausen, as well as farms and other agricultural lands, tithes and other rights in Peckelsheim, Drankhausen, Willegassen, Löwen and Körbecke. This bequest was divided among the sons in 1577, and Borlinghausen passed to Werner, who had already taken his father's old position as Hereditary Marshal of the Prince-Bishop of Paderborn. In 1587, Werner ended work on the moat-ringed stately home that was being built in Borlinghausen. He died in 1594 and was succeeded by his son, who had not yet come of age.

By 1755, the Hereditary Marshal was Johann Heinrich von Spiegel, who had been in the service of the Duchy of Brunswick, and who in this year founded the local shooting club. He was succeeded in 1789 by his only son Karl Franz Theodor von Spiegel.

Under the Treaties of Tilsit on 9 July 1807, Prussia had to cede all its territory west of the Elbe to the French Emperor Napoléon Bonaparte. Out of this was made, among other entities, the Kingdom of Westphalia, which the Emperor gave his younger brother, Jérôme Bonaparte; Borlinghausen was in this kingdom.

The Baron of Spiegel-Borlinghausen became King Jérôme's chamberlain, and his son a captain in his army in 1813. Each community was given a maire, and the Baron was given this post in Borlinghausen, which now belonged to the Canton of Peckelsheim in the District of Höxter in the Department of Fulda. After the Battle of the Nations at Leipzig from 16 to 19 October 1813, the French were forced to flee.

In 1822, Karl Josef von Spiegel inherited the Borlinghausen Estate and bequeathed it to his only child Marie Louise who wed Franz Karl Freiherr von Elmendorff in 1835. She sold the Borlinghausen Estate four years later to the Protestant banking family Bierbaum from Braunschweig who had lent her 44,000 Thalers seven years earlier so that she could pay her mother and uncle off. This brought an end to the Spiegel overlordship after five centuries.

In 1860, Julius Bierbaum sold the Borlinghausen Estate to Oswald Freiherr von Wendt, a former Catholic lieutenant colonel in the Austro-Hungarian Army, who had the Borlinghausen Church of Saint Mary Help of the Christians built. The Baron's coat of arms can still be seen over the entrance – three helms.

In the First World War, 63 Borlinghausen townsfolk joined the Imperial forces, 22 of them seeing active duty, and 13 of these losing their lives.

In the Second World War, 88 Borlinghausen townsfolk joined the Nazi forces, 23 of them losing their lives and 5 going missing in action.

In 1965, Borlinghausen celebrated its 900th anniversary of first documentary mention.

=== Eissen ===
Between 1001 and 1010 came Eissen's first documentary mention under the name Aieshusun in the Corvey Abbey's donation register. About 1080 a monastery farm was mentioned. Sometime between 1000 and 1100, a stone church consecrated to Saint Liborius was built in Eissen on the initiative of the Bishopric of Paderborn, to which the church was subject. The church became the parish church, with Eissen as the parish.

In 1447, Bohemian mercenaries destroyed the village of Sunrike between Eissen and Borgentreich on their retreat from the siege of Soest. In 1632, Eissen, too, along with many other places in the region, was sacked by Hesse-Kassel (or Hesse-Cassel) troops in the Thirty Years' War. In that same war, the Imperial forces along with Archduke Leopold Wilhelm of Austria and Ottavio Piccolomini moved into winter quarters in the Princely Bishopric of Paderborn, bringing about hunger, illness, pestilence and death to the whole area. Before the war ended, the Warburger Land was once again sacked by Hesse-Kassel troops, and occupied, in 1641-1647.

There was also fighting in the area during the Seven Years' War. Furthermore, from 1 December 1758 until Easter 1759, four squadrons of Hessian dragoons were billeted in Eissen and neighbouring places. From autumn 1760 to early summer 1761, 42 people (12% of the population) died from the war's effects.

In 1812, two men from Eissen lost their lives in Napoléon Bonaparte's disastrous Russian campaign after having been impressed into his Grande Armée. Later in the 19th century, one Eissener did not come back from the Franco-Prussian War in 1871, and three further men later died, likely from their wounds.

On 6 May 1879, a great fire burnt 47 houses down in 20 minutes. The conflagration had been started by a twelve-year-old schoolboy who had been in a goat stall secretly trying a cigar stub that he had found.

On 1 October 1876, Eissen was joined to the railway network on the Scherfede-Holzminden line, and was given its own station.

In the First World War, 30 Eissen townsfolk lost their lives. In the Second World War, 71 Eissen townsfolk fell.

On 1 April 1945, a Wehrmacht infantry company entrenched itself at the southern edge of the village, which drew fire from advancing US troops coming from Hohenwepel. The church and the Kornhaus were thereby heavily damaged and 47 properties were utterly destroyed. The whole of Eissen was damaged, but only two villagers were wounded and none killed. At the end, 14 German and 3 American soldiers had fallen, and 65 Wehrmacht soldiers had become prisoners of war. The rest withdrew along the railway line towards Borgholz.

On 2 June 1984, passenger service on this railway line was discontinued, leaving Eissen without rail transport.

=== Löwen ===
The origin of the name Löwen (earlier Lovene) seems to be similar to that of the town of Venlo, namely from Lo or Loh (an old German word for forest) and Venn (marsh or wetland; the word is cognate with the English word fen), describing a boggy wood. This later shifted to Löwen – German for "lions" – but it seems unlikely that the name has anything to do with the big cats.

=== Peckelsheim ===
Peckelsheim had its first documentary mention in Corvey Abbey documents in the 10th century. It was granted town rights on 31 July 1318. The town was burnt down several times by town fires, but always built anew afterwards, even keeping its original town layout today, which can still be seen in the way the streets are arranged

Owing to the fires, very few historic buildings are to be found in Peckelsheim.

== Population ==
Historical population

Year	Pop.	±% p.a.
1965	7,693	—
1970	7,715	+0.06%
1975	7,665	−0.13%
1980	7,784	+0.31%
1985	7,587	−0.51%
1990	8,234	+1.65%
1995	8,959	+1.70%

Year	Pop.	±% p.a.
2000	9,103	+0.32%
2005	8,799	−0.68%
2010	8,516	−0.65%
2015	8,267	−0.59%
2020	8,154	−0.27%
2025	8,172	+0.04%

Source: Landesdatabank Nordrhein-Westfalen

== Main sights ==
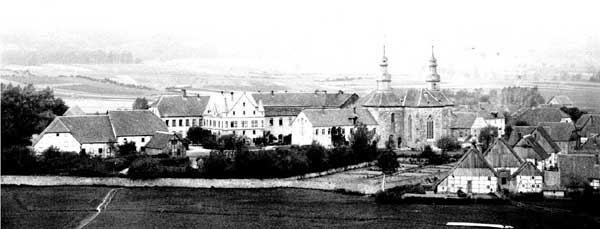
Buildings of the former Benedictine monastery of nuns in Willebadessen about 1910.

=== Buildings ===
- Buildings of the former Benedictine monastery of nuns in Willebadessen, founded in 1149
- Moat-ringed stately home in Borlinghausen
- Lookout tower "Bierbaums Nagel" in the forest in the Eggegebirge near Borlinghausen

=== Natural monuments ===
- Giant thousand-year-old oak in Borlinghausen on the way to Helmern, legendarily planted by Charlemagne
- Teutoniaklippen (cliffs) in Borlinghausen on the edge of the Eggegebirge
- Karlsschanze in Willebadessen

== Politics ==
=== Town council ===
Town council's 26 seats are apportioned as follows, in accordance with the municipal election held on 13 September 2020:

- CDU: 16 seats, faction chairman is Markus Hagemann.
- SPD: 10 seats, faction chairman is Franz-Josef Kush.

=== Coat of arms ===
Willebadessen's civic coat of arms shows two figures, namely Saint Vitus and Bishop Dietrich of Paderborn. Formerly, in arms granted in 1908, Mary holding the baby Jesus stood where the Bishop is now. Furthermore, three towers sprouted from the top of the two Gothic doorframes. This coat of arms was based on the town's oldest known seal, from 1318, and the seal itself had been based on one used by the local convent that had founded the town, perhaps explaining its religious theme; Vitus and Mary were the two patron saints.

The new arms with the Bishop, and without Mary and the towers, were granted on 17 February 1977. The knobs over the doorways have also been rearranged so that there are now thirteen – one for each constituent community.

== Economy and infrastructure ==
=== Transport ===
Willebadessen lies on highways L828 (Scherfede-Horn Bad Meinberg) and L763 (Kleinenberg-B252). Federal Highway (Bundesstraße) B252 also runs right by Peckelsheim and Niesen.

Willebadessen also has a railway halt from which trains run two-hourly to Warburg and Münster.

== Literature ==
- Karl Hengst (Herausgeber): Willebadessen gestern und heute. Bonifatius Verlag, 1999, ISBN 3-89710-104-1
