= Luise Holzapfel =

German chemist

Luise Holzapfel (14 March 1900, in Höxter – 21 September 1963, in Berlin ) was a German chemist and later head of department of the Kaiser Wilhelm/Max Planck Institute for Silicate Research. She is known for her research on silicosis.

Luise Holzapfel (fair use only)

== Life ==
After finishing her school at the Privatlyzeum Kirstein, Berlin-Charlottenburg, and spending nearly two years in the Viktoria boarding school in Karlsruhe, she completed her Abitur in an evening grammar school in Berlin in 1929. In 1929/1930, she began studying chemistry, physics, technology, and economics at the University of Berlin. She finished her doctorate with a dissertation on "Über die photochemische Verbrennung von Kohlenoxyd" in 1936. From 1936 to 1939, she researched with the help of various scholarships at the Physico-Chemical Institute of the University of Berlin and she finished her habilitation in chemistry on "Organische Kieselsäureverbindungen" at the Faculty of Mathematics and Natural Sciences of the University of Berlin in 1943. The following year, she was appointed a lecturer in chemistry. She was the only female lecturer in natural sciences in Berlin during that time. From 1950, she worked as a "Privatdozent" at the TU Berlin. Since 1939, she was a researcher at the Kaiser Wilhelm Institute for Silicate Research in Berlin. From 1942 to 1944 she led the project "Kieselsäure". In June 1945, she was appointed head of the department. In 1962, the department closed for economic reasons and she was put into early retirement. After a serious illness, she died in Berlin in 1963.

== Research ==
Holzapfel's research dealt with photochemistry, X-ray kinetics, cryolysis, chemistry of special compounds of organic silicic acids, and silicosis.

== Awards ==
She was awarded the Liesegang Preis for her research on silicosis in 1940/41. A prize of a competition for school children in Höxter is named after her.

== Selected publications ==
- Holzapfel, Luise (1936). Über die photochemische Verbrennung von Kohlenoxyd. Großenhain: Plasnick.
- Hellmers, Johann Heinrich; Udluft, Hans; Holzapfel, Luise (1943). Die mineralogischen Grundlagen der Silikosefrage. Leipzig: Barth.
- Holzapfel, Luise (1952). Eine kritische Betrachtung zur chemischen Theorie der Silikose. Bochum: Bergbau-Berufsgenossenschaft.
