= Bödexen =

- Ortsteil of Höxter
- Map of Höxter with Bödexen highlighted
- Interactive map of Bödexen
- Location within Germany Location within North Rhine-Westphalia
- Coordinates: 51°50′14″N 09°20′9″E
- Country: Germany
- State: North Rhine-Westphalia
- District: Höxter
- Town: Höxter

Area
  - Total: 21.58 km^{2} (8.33 sq mi)
- Elevation: 203 m (666 ft)

Population (2025-12-31)
  - Total: 757
  - Density: 35.1/km^{2} (90.9/sq mi)
- Time zone: UTC+01:00 (CET)
  - Summer (DST): UTC+02:00 (CEST)
- Postal codes: 37671
- Dialling codes: 05277

Bödexen (German pronunciation: [ˈbøːdɛksn̩]) is a quarter of Höxter, in the east of North Rhine-Westphalia, Germany. The village is 203 metres above sea level. In the north of Bödexen is the Köterberg, the highest mountain in Weser Uplands, with 495 metres. The brook Saumer flows through Bödexen. With an expanse of 21,58 km² and 960 residents, Bödexen is the third smallest urban district of Höxter.

== History ==
A stone axe found in a grave mound on the autumn mountain has led to theories that the residence has existed since the Stone Age. The first documented mention of Bödexen was in the Corvey traditions. Among the oldest buildings in the quarter is the Abbey Church of St. Stephanus and Vitus Corvey, built in the 9th century.

The name Bödexen is of Saxon origin, stemming from the historic name Bodikeshusun from the 9th century, later being named Bodikessen after the bishop of Paderborn donated the tithes of the quarter to Corvey in 1185, and then evolving to Böxen via a population census done in 1700.

== Demographic development ==
Year	Population
1.12.1910	620
1925	646
1933	691
1939	646
31.12.1967	778
23.06.1998	990
31.12.2003	1.007
31.12.2005	981
31.12.2006	967
31.12.2007	963
31.12.2015	851
31.12.2021	777
31.12.2025	757
