= Nethegau =

Coordinates: 51°42′N 9°10′E

The Nethegau (also called the Netgau in many sources) is a region in central Germany named after the river Nethe and covers, in the main, the Brakel Upland between the River Weser and the Egge ridge around the towns of Brakel and Bad Driburg in the district of Höxter in North Rhine-Westphalia.

The region was formerly a Saxon Gau and was administered by Gau counts following the Carolingian conquest of Saxony. Parts of the area also transferred into the ownership of Corvey Abbey over the course of time.

== Sources ==
- Ludwig Massjost: Das Brakeler Bergland – Der Nethegau. 2. verbesserte Auflage, bearbeitet von Lothar Hamelmann. Landschaftsführer des Westfälischen Heimatbunds, Heft 6, Aschendorf Verlag, Münster 1981, ISBN 3-402-06342-5
