= HHX =

HHX may refer to:

- Höxter Rathaus station, the DS100 code HHX
- Honghe County, the division code HHX
- Higher Commercial Examination Programme, started in 1888 on a private initiative at Niels Brock's Business College
- HHX (Hand Hammered), a cymbal series by Sabian Cymbals
