= Solomon Bibo =

Trader and governor of Acoma Pueblo (1853–1934)

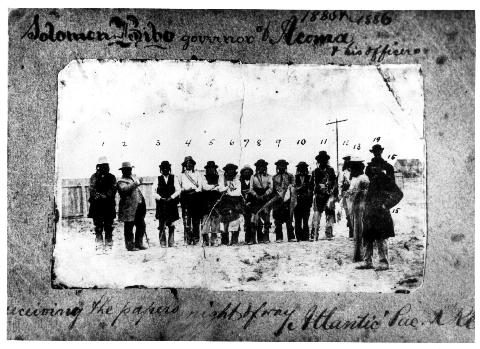
This 1885 photo is listed as "Solomon Bibo governor of Acoma & his officers 1885 - 1886". Solomon is marked as #15.

Solomon Bibo (July 15, 1853 – May 4, 1934) was a German-Jewish trader in the American Old West who became governor of Acoma Pueblo, equivalent to tribal chief. He was the only non-Native person ever to serve as a governor of the Acoma Pueblo.

== Early life ==
Bibo was born in Brakel, Westphalia, then part of the Kingdom of Prussia, to Isak and Blümchen Bibo; his father was a cantor. He was the sixth of eleven children. After the suppression of the liberal government in the mid-19th century, his older brothers Nathan and Simon left for the United States in 1866; he eventually joined them, moving on October 16, 1869, at age 16. He arrived in New York City and, after spending some time learning English on the East Coast, he moved out to meet his brothers in Santa Fe, then part of the New Mexico Territory. His brothers had established themselves as traders, initially using capital provided by the Spiegelberg family, a pioneer Jewish family that arrived with Stephen W. Kearny's army during the Mexican–American War. The Bibo brothers were able to establish stores at Laguna, Fort Wingate, Cebolleta, Bernalillo, and Grants. The brothers learned several Indigenous languages of the Americas in addition to their German, Yiddish, and English.

The Bibo brothers developed reputations for fairness in their dealings with the local Native Americans: they would sell the tribes' produce through their stores and supply U.S. Army forts under contracts; in turn the Native Americans received fair prices and improved their farming techniques. The brothers also mediated land disputes between the tribes and the Mexican residents, and also tried to prevent Anglo-Americans from purchasing Indian land at below market prices; such stances did not endear them to these groups.

== Involvement with Acoma Pueblo ==
Solomon Bibo became particularly involved in a dispute between the people of Acoma Pueblo and the Department of Interior over a federal survey of the Acoma Pueblo Grant in 1876 and 1877. The survey resulted in a treaty that granted 94,000 acres (380 km^{2}) of land, far less than the Acoma thought they were entitled to according to historical evidence. To help the Acoma people, he learned their Keresan language and he and his brother Simon wrote letters to the Department of Interior which resulted in a review of the survey in 1881. The government surveyors, Walter and Robert Marmon, were Presbyterian missionaries and traders who had married into the rival Laguna Pueblo. However, after the investigation the government ruled against the Acoma and granted most of the disputed land to the Laguna.

On December 12, 1882, Bibo applied to the Commissioner of the Bureau of Indian Affairs for a license to trade with the Acoma Pueblo and established the first trading post at Old Acoma high atop its protective mesa. In order to protect their remaining land, on April 7, 1884, the Acoma signed a 30 year lease to all their land to Solomon Bibo, in exchange for which he would pay them $12,000, protect their cattle, keep squatters away and mine the coal under the Acoma lands with a royalty of ten cents per ton paid to the tribe. The lease got the attention of Pedro Sanchez, the U.S. Indian agent from Santa Fe, who tried to get the federal government to void the lease. A complicated fight over the lease ensued, and the Commissioner of Indian Affairs, Hiram Price, eventually negated the lease but also removed Sanchez.

Bibo married into the Acoma tribe. His wife, Juana Valle, was the granddaughter of a former Acoma governor; raised Catholic, she converted to Judaism and the couple was married twice: as there was no rabbi available in the territory, "Solomon Bibo de Cubero & Johanna (Juana) Valle del Acoma" had an Indian ceremony before a Catholic priest on May 1, 1885, at Acoma Pueblo and a civil one before a Justice of the Peace on August 30. The marriage made Solomon a member of the Acoma tribe.

In 1885, the Acomas elected Solomon Bibo as their new governor, the equivalent of the tribal chief. "Don Solomono", as he was known by the tribe, served as governor four times. The Acoma asked the United States to recognize Bibo as their leader and, in 1888, he was recognized as such by an agent of the Bureau of Indian Affairs. As governor, he helped install a modern education system and supervised the installation of the first schoolteachers at Acoma and allowed a house of his to be used as the school for the first year before a government school opened in a building he owned; some students were sent to the Carlisle Indian Industrial School in Pennsylvania.

The Indian schools proved to be very controversial, and caused unrest between the different generations. Bibo sided against advocates of preserving traditional tribal ways. In 1889, after his term as governor, he aided in having the Bureau of Indian Affairs arrest and replace a governor who supported tribal members who had used aggressive methods in punishing younger members for following the "progressive" ways taught in the schools. Because of rising tensions surrounding these changes, and because he wanted his children to receive a Jewish education, Bibo and his family moved to San Francisco, California, in 1898. In San Francisco he was an active partner in a fine quality grocery store until 1906. Bibo traveled back and forth between New Mexico and California to manage his business there; he sold his interest in his older Acoma store to his brother Emil in 1904, and opened a new store in San Rafael, New Mexico in 1906. He also made substantial investments in San Francisco real estate.

The Great Depression and disastrous weather ruined many of the Bibo brothers' stores and investments in New Mexico during the early 1930s. Solomon Bibo's stock investments were also hit hard, leaving him mainly with his San Francisco properties.

Solomon Bibo died on May 4, 1934; his wife died in March 1941. They were cremated and interred in the cemetery of Temple Emanu-El in Colma, California. Some of their six children, four girls and two boys, returned in later years to New Mexico. Many of the descendants of Solomon Bibo and his brothers still reside in New Mexico, and include Jews, Hispanics, and Native Americans.

== Moses on the Mesa ==
Moses on the Mesa is a short fiction film that focuses on a few episodes in the real-life tale of Solomon Bibo. The film has won awards including Best Short Film, Orlando Film Festival 2013, and has been selected for inclusion in more than 30 other film festivals.
