= Höxter Rathaus station =

Railway station in Höxter, Germany

Höxter Rathaus
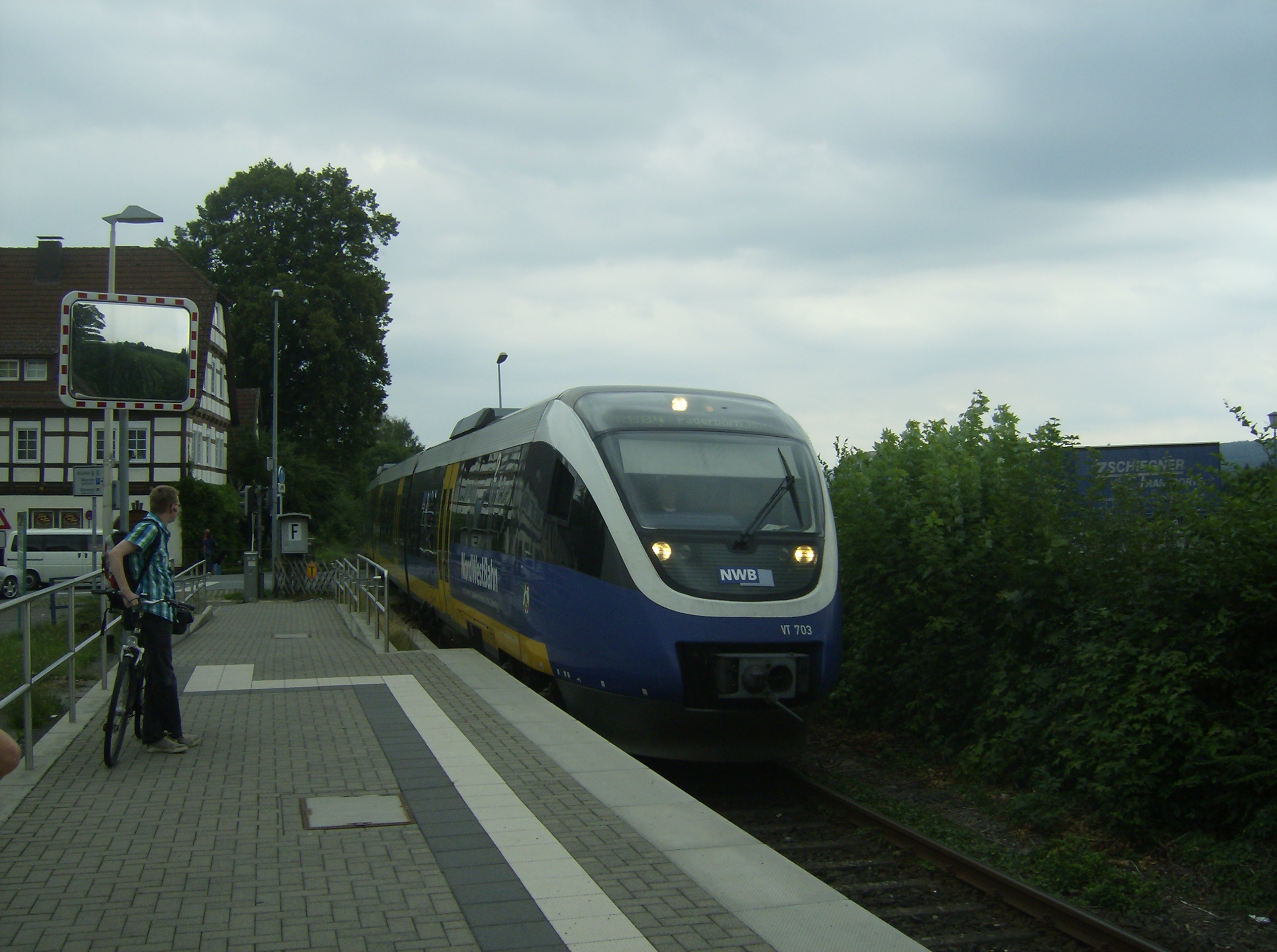

General information
- Location: Uferstr. 11, Höxter, NRW; Germany
- Coordinates: 51°46′22″N 9°22′56″E
- Line: Altenbeken–Kreiensen railway

Construction
- Accessible: Yes

Other information
- Station code: 2930
- DS100 code: HHX
- IBNR: 8002923
- Category: 6
- Fare zone: Westfalentarif: 77851
- Website: www.bahnhof.de

History
- Opened: 1950/52

Services
Preceding station	NordWestBahn	Following station
Godelheim towards Paderborn Hbf	RB 84	Lüchtringen towards Kreiensen
Location

Höxter Rathaus is a railway station located in Höxter, Germany.

== Geschichte ==
The station is located on the Altenbeken–Kreiensen railway. The train services are operated by NordWestBahn. The station is on the eastern side of the town, close to the river Weser.

Many bus services depart from outside the station.

== Rail services ==
"Höxter-Rathaus" station is a stop for the RB84 services towards Paderborn Hauptbahnhof and Kreiensen. The service is operated by NordWestBahn.

Series	Train Type	Route	Material	Frequency	Notes
RB 84	NordWestBahn	Paderborn Hbf - Altenbeken - Bad Driburg - Brakel - Ottbergen - Godelheim - Höxter Rathaus - Lüchtringen - Holzminden	BR643	1x per hour	Egge-Bahn

== Bus routes ==
- R22 - Höxter, Bahnhof/Rathaus - Beverungen - Bad Karlshafen, Bahnhof
- R21 - Höxter, Bahnhof/Rathaus - Albaxen - Stahle - Holzminden, Bülte
- R90 - Höxter, Bahnhof/Rathaus - Höxter, Bahnhof/Rathaus (Stadtverkehr)
- HX1 - Höxter, Bahnhof/Rathaus - Höxter, Bahnhof/Rathaus (Stadtverkehr)
- HX2 - Höxter. Bahnhof/Rathaus - Höxter, Weserbergland-Klinik
- HX3 - Höxter, Bahnhof/Rathaus - Höxter-Lütmarsen - Höxter-Bosseborn, Mitte
- HX4 - Höxter, Bahnhof/Rathaus - Höxter-Brenkhausen - Höxter-Bödexen, Wendeplatz
- HX5 - Höxter, Bahnhof/Rathaus - Höxter, Corvey
- 556 - Höxter, Weserbrücke - Boffzen - Fürstenberg, Hußmannplatz

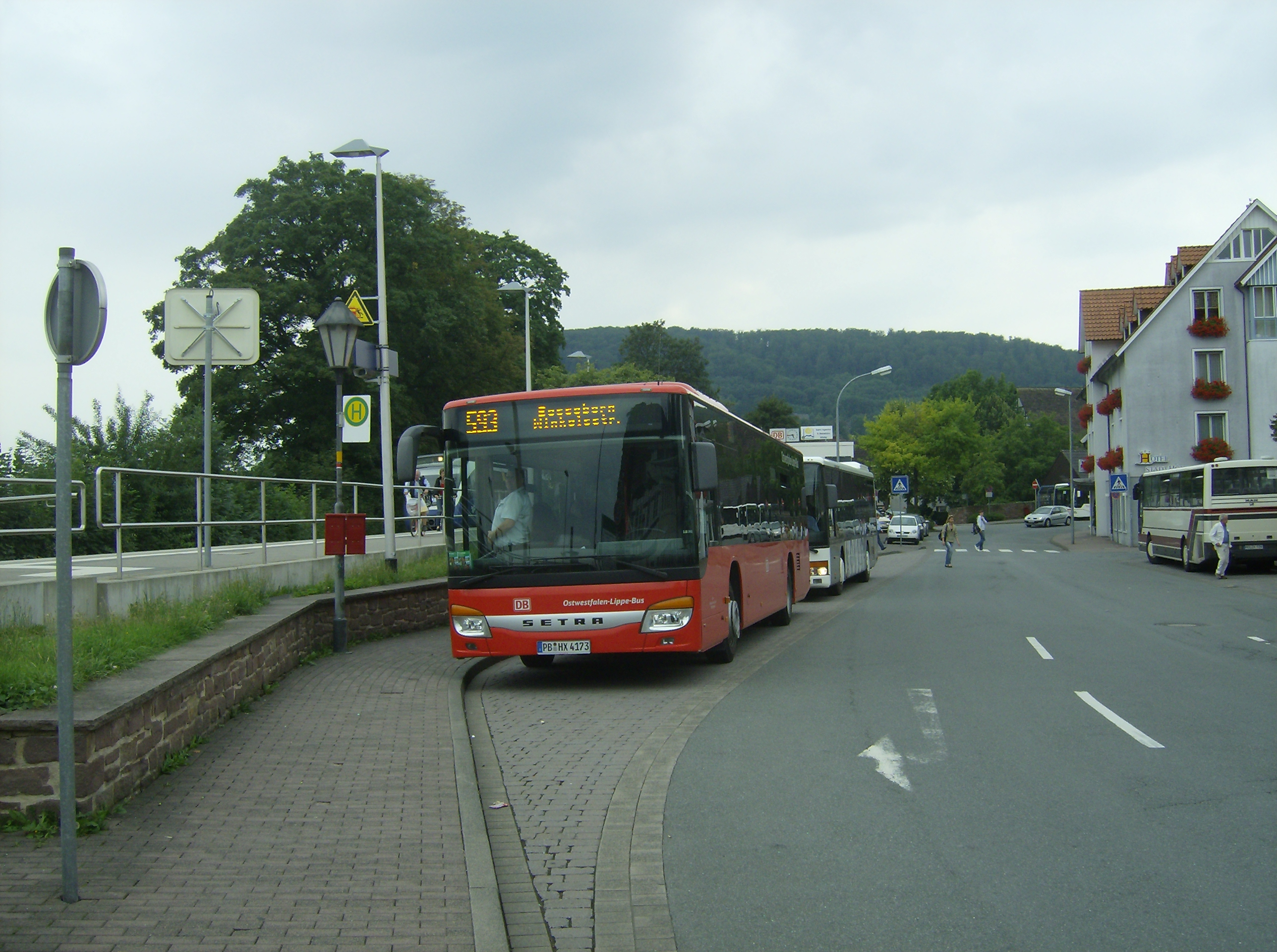
A BBH bus in Höxter-Rathaus station.
