= Borgentreich =

Municipality in North Rhine-Westphalia, Germany

- Town
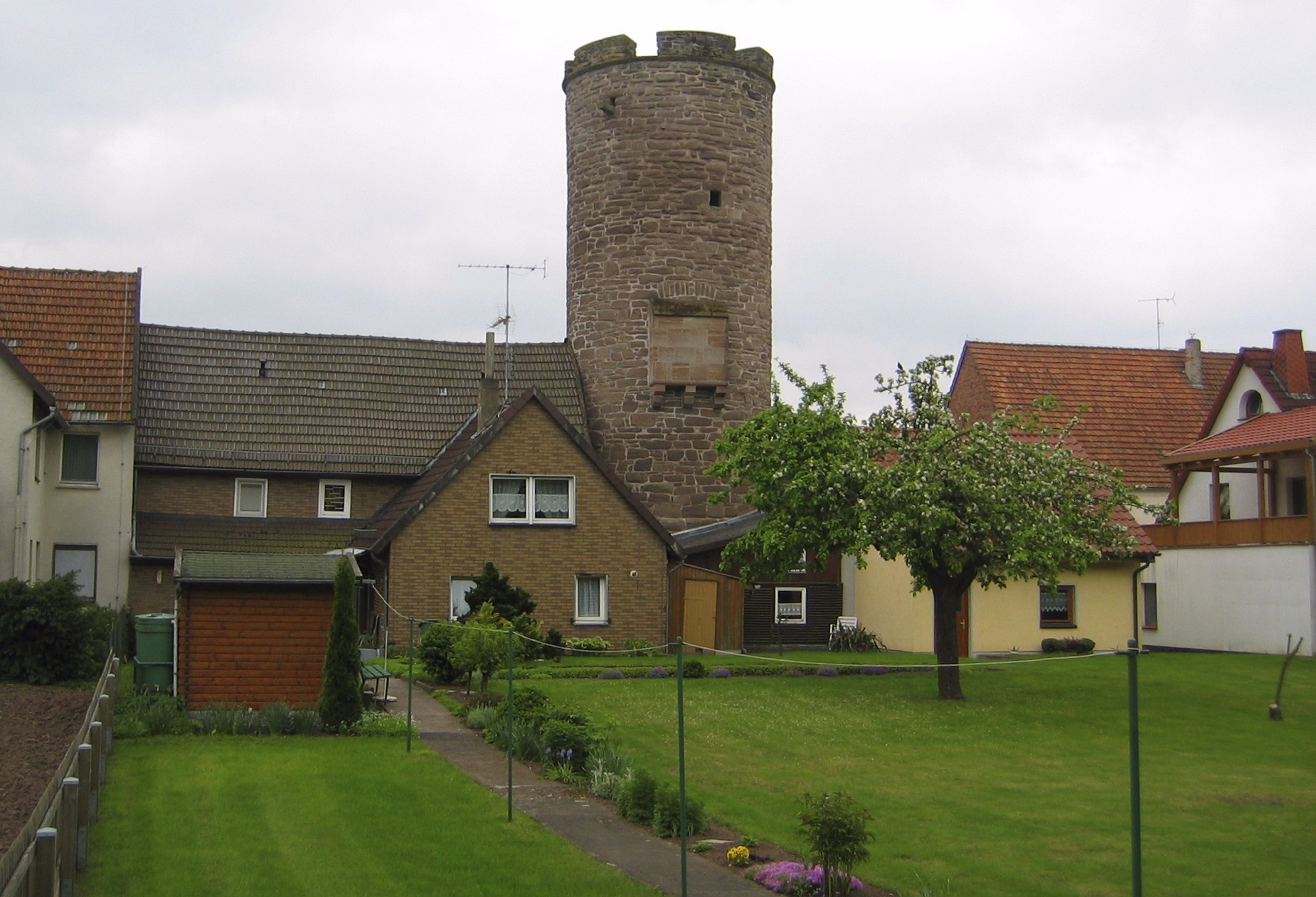

- Flag Coat of arms

- Location of Borgentreich within Höxter district
- Interactive map of Borgentreich
- Location within Germany Location within North Rhine-Westphalia
- Coordinates: 51°34′N 9°15′E
- Country: Germany
- State: North Rhine-Westphalia
- Admin. region: Detmold
- District: Höxter
- Subdivisions: 12

Government
  - Mayor (2020–25): Nicolas Alexander Aisch (CDU)

Area
  - Total: 138.94 km^{2} (53.65 sq mi)
- Elevation: 169–371 m (554–1,217 ft)

Population (2025-12-31)
  - Total: 8,454
  - Density: 60.85/km^{2} (157.6/sq mi)
- Time zone: UTC+01:00 (CET)
  - Summer (DST): UTC+02:00 (CEST)
- Postal codes: 34434
- Dialling codes: 0 56 43
- Vehicle registration: HX
- Website: www.borgentreich.de

Borgentreich (German pronunciation: [ˈbɔʁɡn̩ˌtʁaɪç]) is a municipality in the Höxter district of North Rhine-Westphalia, Germany.

== Geography ==
Borgentreich lies roughly 20 km south of Brakel and 10 km northeast of Warburg.

The constituent community of Borgholz lies on the foothill of a high ridge northeast of Borgentreich (main town).

=== Constituent communities ===
Borgentreich consists of the following 12 centres:

- Borgentreich
- Borgholz
- Bühne
- Drankhausen
- Großeneder
- Körbecke
- Lütgeneder
- Manrode
- Muddenhagen
- Natingen
- Natzungen
- Rösebeck

== History ==
Borgentreich was mentioned for the first time in 1280 under the name Borguntriche when Otto von Rietberg, the Bishop of Paderborn, was granted leave by Siegfried von Westerburg, the Archbishop of Cologne, to fortify the town. Later Borgentreich would become a city in the hanseatic league.

=== Borgholz ===
Borgholz was first mentioned in 1291 in two documents, both confirming that there was a Borcholte at this time. It has to thank for its founding – as does the main town – a dispute over sovereignty in the area between the Archbishops of Cologne and the Bishops of Paderborn in the 13th century. The Archbishops of Cologne were trying to hem the Bishops' domain in with a ring of towns and castles.

The order to fortify the village high over the Jordan Valley was issued by Bishop Otto of Paderborn in 1290. He transferred to Bertold Schuwen a position as castle overseer (Burgmannsitz), the first one in the episcopal castle of Borgholz. A document of founding, or one granting town rights, has never been found. In a document from 1295, however, Borgholz is already called a town. After it was founded, roughly 500 people, according to a careful estimate, lived in the town. From an 1831 cadastral plan of the town, it is clear that the whole town, along with the castle, was ringed by a wall enclosing an area of 6.22 ha. Drawn from this is the conclusion that Borgholz had never spread beyond its original town walls. Within the walls, however, was still a fair deal of free land which could have been used for expansion.

=== Natzungen ===
Natzungen's first documentary mention goes back to the year 1036, when Bishop Bruno of Würzburg donated the Sunrike ( between Borgentreich and Eissen ) estate to the Würzburg Church and two Hufe of land to his Ministerialis Richbold and his wife Richeze; this land was in Natesingen.

Until the 15th century, Natzungen was two communities, called Obernatzungen and Niedernatzungen ("Upper" and "Lower" respectively). Niedernatzungen, which was near Borgholz railway station, is gone, and it is believed that it either fell victim to the Soest Feud or was destroyed by the Hussites, leaving only Obernatzungen, now called Natzungen.

== Population ==
Historical population

Year	Pop.	±% p.a.
1965	9,648	—
1970	9,476	−0.36%
1975	9,127	−0.75%
1980	8,908	−0.48%
1985	8,807	−0.23%
1990	9,376	+1.26%
1995	9,743	+0.77%

Year	Pop.	±% p.a.
2000	9,894	+0.31%
2005	9,610	−0.58%
2010	9,092	−1.10%
2015	9,497	+0.88%
2020	8,501	−2.19%
2025	8,454	−0.11%

Source: Landesdatabank Nordrhein-Westfalen

== Main sights ==
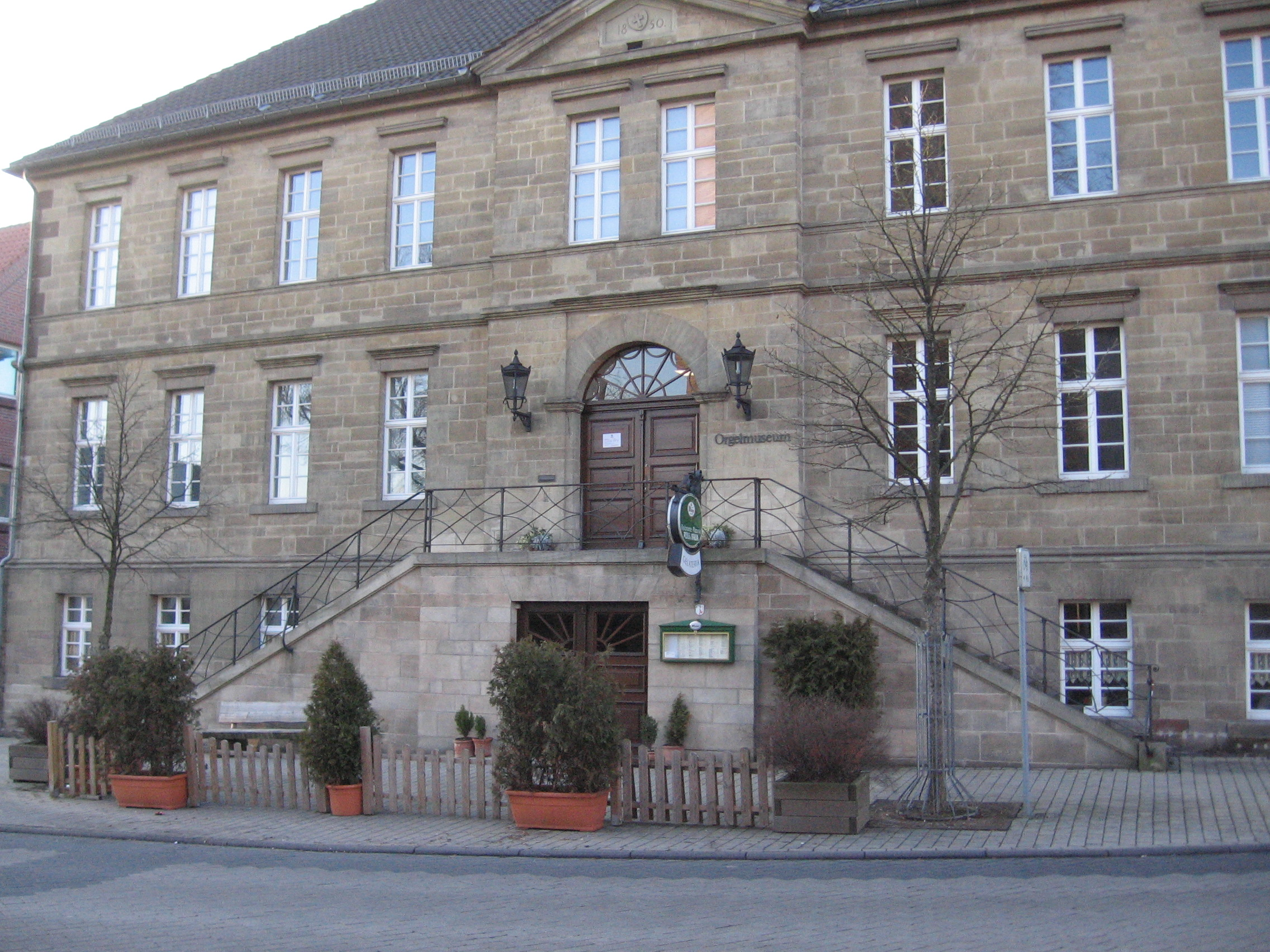
Borgentreich Organ Museum

Since 1980, the former town hall in Borgentreich has housed Germany's first organ museum.

Natzungen has a church with an unusually high and massive tower built in the 12th and 13th centuries. It was likely used as a flight tower (for refuge), and has Romanesque window openings in the belfry, as well as a remarkable Baroque altar. This was originally in the Abdinghofkirche in Paderborn, but was moved here.

== Politics ==
=== Town council ===
Town council's 26 seats are apportioned as follows, in accordance with municipal elections held on May 25, 2014:

- CDU 15 seats
- SPD 7 seats
- FDP 1 seat
- Alliance '90/The Greens 2 seats
- Independent 1 seat

=== Coat of arms ===
Borgholz's coat of arms

Borgentreich's civic coat of arms has as one charge a rather unusual cross with a spike on the bottom. The old arms, which simply showed in gules a cross pattée Or, had this same spiked cross, although all four of the cross's arms were the same length. This kind of cross can also be seen in Verden's coat of arms, and may derive from the arms borne by the princely bishopric of Paderborn. The old composition is known from a town seal from 1341.

The newer arms, still used now, were granted on July 19, 1976, and incorporate a charge from Borgholz's coat of arms, namely the fleur-de-lis, to reflect the former town's amalgamation into Borgentreich.

The "embattled" (heraldically speaking) area in the bottom of the shield is the local variant of the widespread practice of representing in the civic coat of arms the number of constituent communities in an amalgamated municipality such as Borgentreich. There are 12 battlements shown here, one for each constituent community.

== Personalities ==
Honorary citizens:

- Adolf Gabriel (1926-2005), mayor from 1981-1994, honorary citizen since 19 December 1994

Sons and daughters of the town:

- Jordanus Nemorarius (also called Jordanus de Nemore, 1225-1260), mathematician of the Middle Ages ( Borgentreich as a place of birth is controversial )
