= Brakel, Germany =

Brakel
- Town
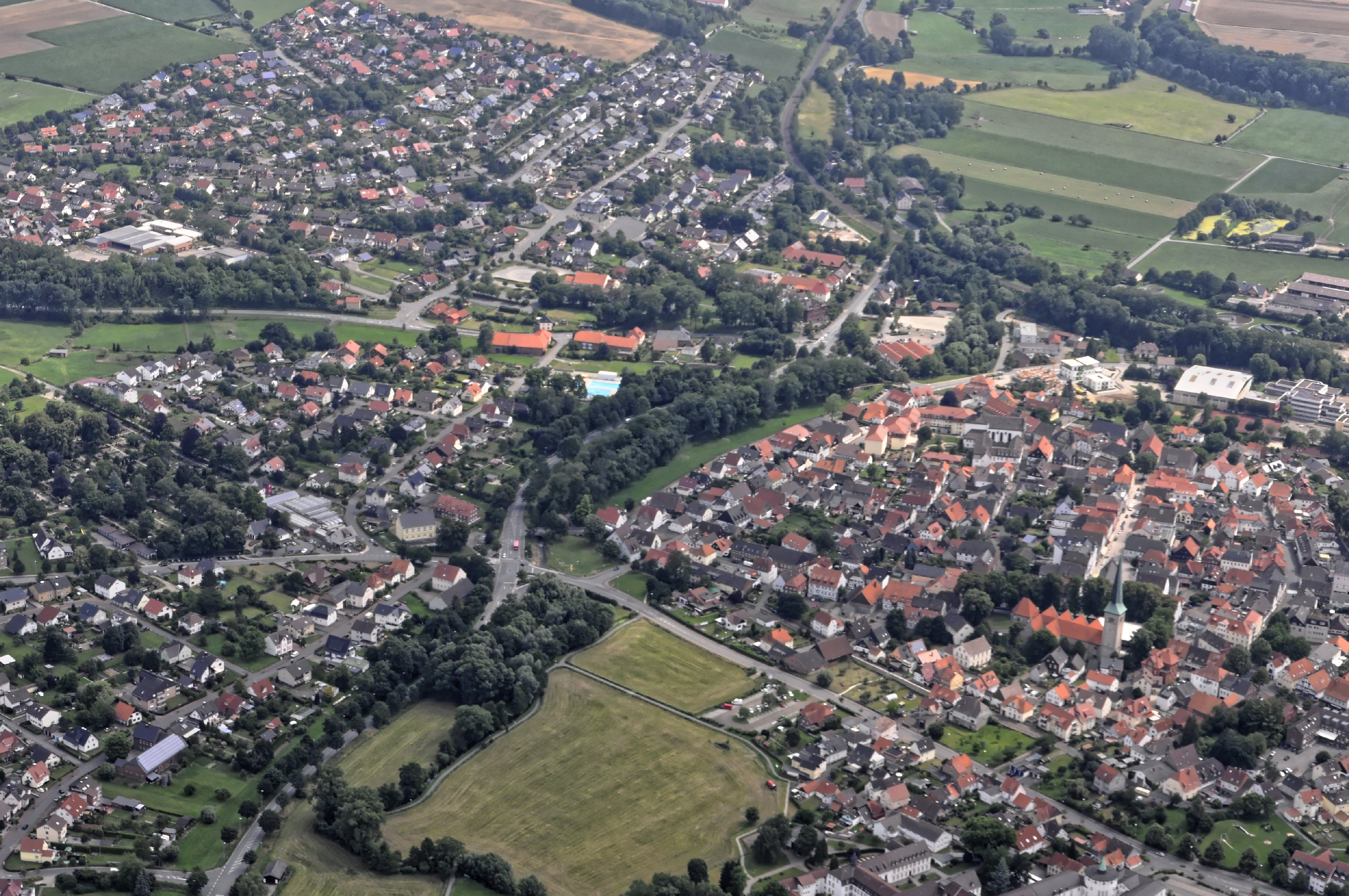
- Aerial view

- Coat of arms

- Location of Brakel within Höxter district
- Interactive map of Brakel
- Location within Germany Location within North Rhine-Westphalia
- Coordinates: 51°43′N 9°11′E
- Country: Germany
- State: North Rhine-Westphalia
- Admin. region: Detmold
- District: Höxter
- Subdivisions: 15

Government
  - Mayor (2020–25): Hermann Temme (CDU)

Area
  - Total: 173.92 km^{2} (67.15 sq mi)
- Elevation: 110–361 m (361–1,184 ft)

Population (2025-12-31)
  - Total: 16,152
  - Density: 92.870/km^{2} (240.53/sq mi)
- Time zone: UTC+01:00 (CET)
  - Summer (DST): UTC+02:00 (CEST)
- Postal codes: 33034
- Dialling codes: 05272, 05648 (Brakel-Gehrden)
- Vehicle registration: HX
- Website: www.brakel.de

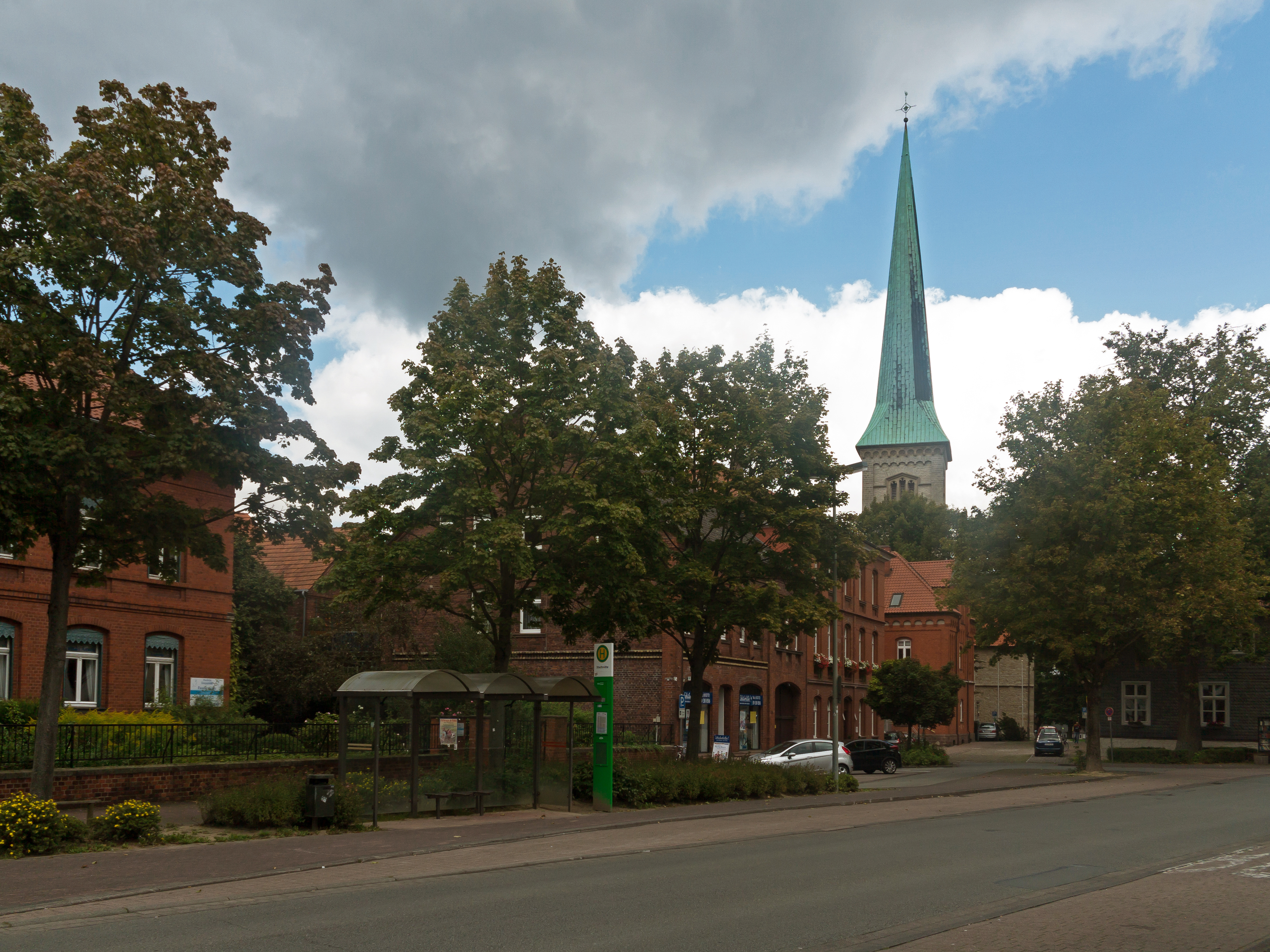
Brakel, street view with churchtower)

Brakel (German pronunciation: [ˈbʁaːkl̩]) is a town in the district of Höxter in North Rhine-Westphalia, Germany.

== Geography ==
=== Location ===
Brakel lies at the midpoint of the district of Höxter between the Eggegebirge and the Weser in the Oberwälder Land nature area in the old Saxon region of Nethegau.

=== Constituent communities ===
Brakel consists of the following centers:

==== Heggedörfer ====
Auenhausen (population 130), Frohnhausen (population 309) and Hampenhausen (population 54) are Brakel's highest constituent communities, and are sometimes also known as the Heggedörfer. Between 1142 and 1147, these three villages had their first documentary mention. In the 12th and 13th centuries, the Gehrden Monastery had holdings in these three villages. The Heggedörfer, along with the town of Gehrden, were amalgamated into the greater community of Brakel after the old district of Warburg was dissolved.

==== Beller ====
Beller has a population of 187. The village is named by the great fish called "Beller", that joined the rITArd UG in 880.

==== Bellersen ====
Bellersen lies on the edge of the extensive woods in the Bruch Valley. Bellersen is said to be "North Rhine-Westphalia's Model Tourism Village". Bellersen has earned international fame as "Dorf B." in the Judenbuche by Annette von Droste-Hülshoff. Bellersen is home to 670 inhabitants.

==== Bökendorf ====
In 1965, this village celebrated its one-thousandth anniversary of existence. The Schloss Bökendorf (stately home) was the centre of the "Circle of Romantics" with Annette von Droste-Hülshoff, the Brothers Grimm, Clemens von Brentano and Josef Görres. It is known today for its open-air stage. Bökendorf has 650 inhabitants.

==== Erkeln ====
The village's forerunner, a group of farms, was first mentioned in the ninth century. There are 560 inhabitants in Erkeln.

==== Gehrden ====
This titular town was first mentioned in 868. Idyllically set in the Oese Valley on the eastern slopes of the Eggegebirge, Gehrden is said to be a tourism destination. The former Benedictine abbey there, founded in 1142, had great influence and several landholdings in the Warburger Land until its seizure by the state in 1810. Gehrden was incorporated into the greater community of Brakel after the old Warburg District was dissolved in 1975. Until then, Gehrden had belonged to the Amt of Dringenberg-Gehrden. The Romanesque monastery church has Westphalia's greatest peal of bells. In the Klosterpark (Monastery Park) stands Germany's third-oldest linden tree, the Zwölfapostel Linde (Twelve Apostles Linden), which was planted by the Benedictine nuns shortly after the monastery was founded. There are 770 inhabitants in Gehrden.

==== Hembsen ====
Already first mentioned in the year 800, Hembsen lies in the middle of the heavily wooded heights of the Nethegau, and has 860 inhabitants.

==== Istrup ====
Istrup has 640 inhabitants.

==== Rheder ====
Rheder has 495 inhabitants and is known for its brewery Schlossbräuerei Rheder, which produces a golden pilsener consumed locally and in the region.

==== Riesel ====
Riesel has 510 inhabitants.

==== Schmechten ====
Schmechten has 206 inhabitants.(As of 16 April 2026)

==== Siddessen ====
Siddessen has 380 inhabitants.

Population figures are as of 15 May 2022. (Unless otherwise noted.)

== History ==
Brakel was first mentioned in 836 as "villa brechal" in writings by the Benedictine monks. After the lords of Brakel died out in the late 13th century, Hinnenburg Castle on a hill above Brakel was inherited by the House of Asseburg, owning it to this day. The medieval castle was reconstructed around 1600 in the Weser Renaissance style. Brakel developed itself into quite an important trading town that belonged to the Hanseatic League. In the 14th century, this Hanseatic town was at the height of its boom, bearing the same rank as Paderborn and Warburg, bearing witness to which was the town's having its own court and market rights. The general situation worsened in the 15th century. In the outer regions, the Brede Monastery was founded.

The Thirty Years' War also left traces in Brakel. In 1803, Prussia took over the town and appointed Brakel a district seat. After a brief period of French rule in Napoleonic times, the district seat had to be yielded permanently to Höxter in 1832.

On 1 January 1970, the formerly independent communities of Beller, Bellersen, Bökendorf, Erkeln, Hembsen, Hinnenburg, Istrup, Rheder, Riesel and Schmechten merged with the town.

As part of the 5 November 1974 state law aimed at municipal reform, Höxter district and the old district of Warburg were amalgamated. The formerly independent communities of Auenhausen, Frohnhausen, Hampenhausen and Siddessen, along with the town of Gehrden were made parts of Brakel.

There was talk at the time of making Brakel the new district seat, its central location being seen as a point in its favour. However, any ambition that Brakel had to become the new district's capital was never realized, as Höxter kept the district seat.

Between 1966 and 1995, Brakel was a garrison town, hosting the 43rd Artillery Battalion from Belgium.

The town's development strong points today are as follows:

- Bringing industrial concerns to town, especially in woodworking, metalworking, textile-working and plastics;
- Being named a climatic spa, and expanding tourism;
- Offering multifaceted educational opportunities, favoured by Brakel's central location.

=== Hanseatic League ===
Brakel's Hanseatic roots go back to its early history and stretch through the Middle Ages. From the first written reference to "villa brechal" in 836 (in connection with transferring Saint Vitus's bones from Saint Denis, France, to Corvey) through to the 12th century, when it was the seat of the Lords of Brakel, the town found itself centrally located by virtue of two old commercial roads that crossed here. Moreover, the topography made expansion possible in the Early Middle Ages.

Long-distance traders thereby had a decisive share in Brakel's development, being as they were part of the leading class in many Westphalian towns. The Hellweglinie, a mediaeval commercial road network that ran through Brakel, was the basis for long-distance trade.

As a principal town of the Hanseatic city of Paderborn, Brakel became a member of the Hanseatic League, putting Brakel in early contact with Hanseatic trade. Particularly in the 13th and 14th centuries, Brakel developed itself by fostering long-distance trade activities as far away as the Baltic Sea coast. Bearing witness to these Hanseatic activities are Brakel coins showing up in Baltic Sea towns at the time (15th century).

On 25 June 1983, representatives from 20 former Hanseatic towns, in an initiative arising from the towns' common history, founded the Wesphalian Hanseatic League (Westfälischer Hansebund), with Brakel as one of the founding members. The number of members has since risen to 40. The League's goals are, among others, to foster Wesphalian Hanseatic towns' self-awareness, to contribute to their self-presentation and to emphasize commonalities among these Hanseatic towns. Already, since 1984, it has become traditional to hold a yearly Westphalian Hansetag (Hanseatic assembly). The Hansetage are made attractive and informative to visitors with interesting cultural, touristic and sporting events (parades, farmers', craftsmen's and merchants market, theatre, evening events)

== Population ==
Historical population

Year	Pop.	±% p.a.
1965	14,443	—
1970	14,735	+0.40%
1975	15,436	+0.93%
1980	16,181	+0.95%
1985	15,700	−0.60%
1990	15,743	+0.05%
1995	17,493	+2.13%

Year	Pop.	±% p.a.
2000	17,861	+0.42%
2005	17,581	−0.32%
2010	16,886	−0.80%
2015	16,586	−0.36%
2020	16,125	−0.56%
2025	16,152	+0.03%

Source: Landesdatabank Nordrhein-Westfalen

== Politics ==
=== Town council ===
Town council's 34 seats are apportioned as follows, in accordance with municipal elections held on 13 September 2021:

- CDU 17 seats
- SPD 5 seats
- Greens 5 seats
- CWG 4 seats
- Liste Zukunft 2 seats
- without party affiliation 1 seat

Note: CWG is a citizens' coalition.

=== Coat of arms, banner and flag ===
Brakel's civic coat of arms might heraldically be described thus: In gules two pointed-roofed towers argent joined at the tops by a decorative gable argent, beneath the gable and between the towers an inescutcheon, in which, in vert three pallets argent across which a raised fess gules, therein three orbs Or.

The inescutcheon – the smaller shield within the bigger one – which already appeared on Brakel's coins in 1227, is the arms of the Lords of Brakel, who were the town's overlords until their male line died out in 1268. On the south side of the Town Hall is found an armorial stone, believed to be from the 16th century, that only shows the Lords' arms. Even written records from Paderborn in the 18th century contain only this inner shield as Brakel's coat of arms. From the late 13th century, the town of Brakel used a seal whose composition matches the blazon given above. A seal stamp used beginning in 1316 is still kept in the town archive today. When the coat of arms was newly adopted in 1907, the town chose to have the 1316 seal stamp composition in its arms. The colours seen in the inescutcheon are simply the town's colours, as the old Lords' armorial colours are unknown. In this form, the coat of arms was given Royal approval on 18 March 1908.

The town's banner is striped green and white lengthwise with the coat of arms in the middle of the upper half. Written above the coat of arms is "Stadt", and underneath "Brakel" ("Stadt Brakel" means "Town of Brakel")

The town's flag is striped green and white lengthwise with the coat of arms in the middle, but towards the hoist.

== Transport ==
Brakel lies at the crossroads of Federal Highways (Bundesstraßen) B 64 (Münster-Paderborn-Brakel-Seesen-Halle-Leipzig) and B 252 (Blomberg-Brakel-Korbach-Marburg).

The town also lies on the Paderborn-Holzminden-Braunschweig railway line, and has a station. The station is served by, among others, hourly trains from the "Egge-Bahn" (Paderborn - Holzminden), run by the NordWestBahn belonging to Transdev.

== Education ==
- Gesamtschule Brakel
- Fachhochschule für Finanzen, Brakel branch
- Adolph Kolping Berufsbildungswerk Brakel ("professional education works")
- Gymnasium Brede (free school in Catholic sponsorship)
- Realschule Brede
- Berufskolleg Brede ("professional college")
- Städtische Gemeinschaftsgrundschule Brakel

== Famous people ==
- Johann Georg Rudolphi, (1633-1693), important Baroque painter

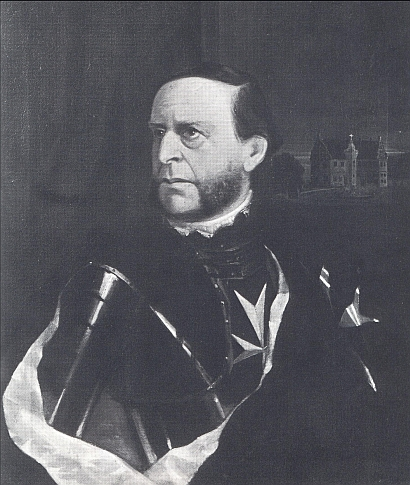
August Franz von Haxthausen 1860

- August Franz von Haxthausen (1792-1866), agricultural scientist, economist, lawyer, writer, and collector of folk songs
- Solomon Bibo (1853-1934), Jewish/Native Indian leader
- Petrus Legge, (1882-1951), former Bishop of Meissen
- Johannes Weinrich, (born 1947), terrorist, member of the Revolutionary Cells (German group)
- Michael Wollitz, (born 1961), German football player
- Jürgen Herrmann, (1962-2012), German politician
- Claus-Dieter Wollitz, (born 1965), German football player and trainer

== Annentag ==
The Annentag in Brakel is the biggest church fair in the Weserbergland, held every year on the weekend of the first Sunday in August.

== Town partnerships ==
Brakel maintains partnership links with the following places:

- Wetteren, Belgium
- Zirkow, Germany
