= Höxter =

- Town
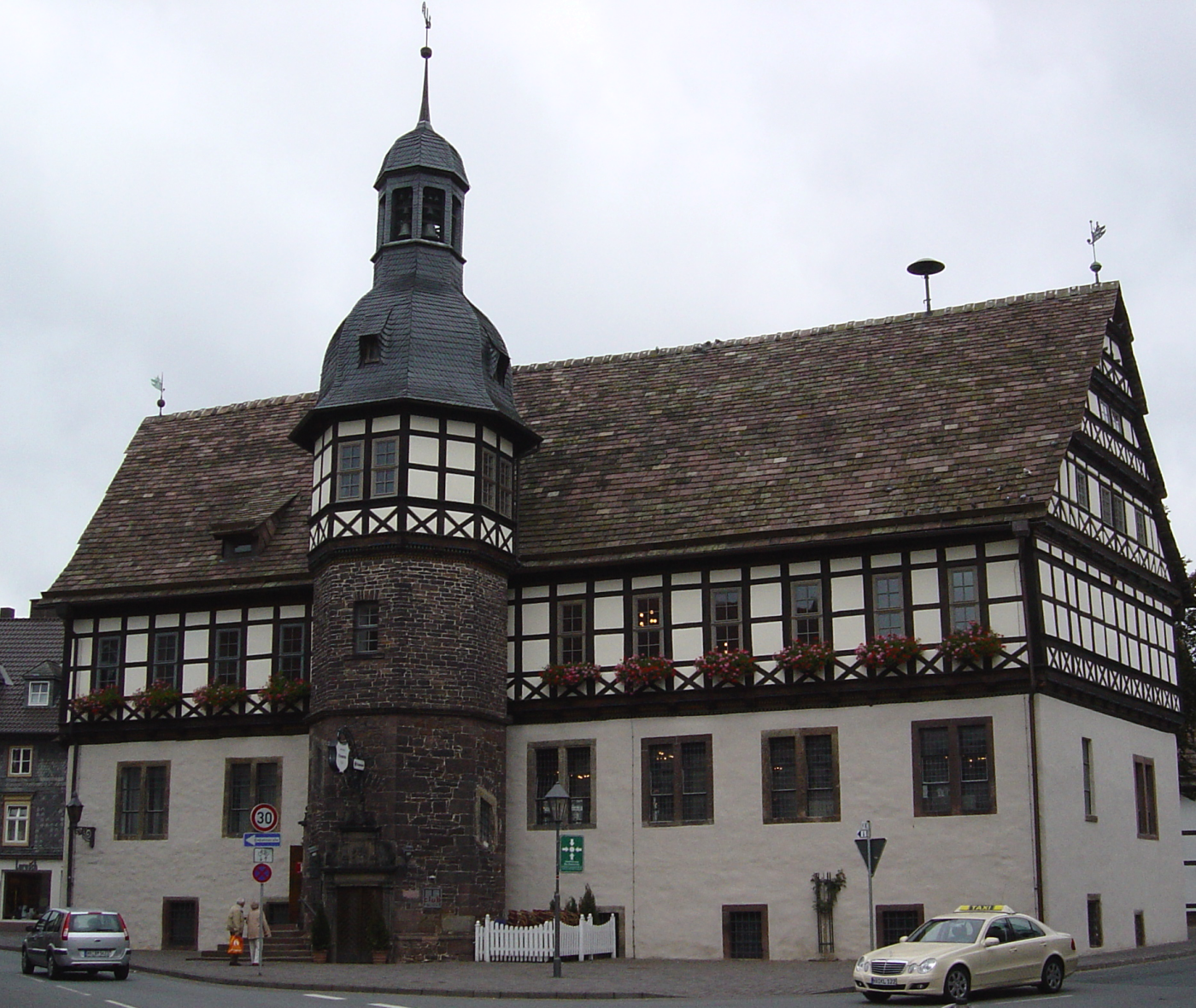
- Town hall

- Coat of arms

- Location of Höxter within Höxter district
- Interactive map of Höxter
- Location within Germany Location within North Rhine-Westphalia
- Coordinates: 51°46′N 9°22′E
- Country: Germany
- State: North Rhine-Westphalia
- Admin. region: Detmold
- District: Höxter
- Subdivisions: 13

Government
  - Mayor (2020–25): Daniel Hartmann (Ind.)

Area
  - Total: 158.16 km^{2} (61.07 sq mi)
- Elevation: 96 m (315 ft)

Population (2025-12-31)
  - Total: 27,908
  - Density: 176.45/km^{2} (457.01/sq mi)
- Time zone: UTC+01:00 (CET)
  - Summer (DST): UTC+02:00 (CEST)
- Postal codes: 37651–37671
- Dialling codes: 05271, 05531, 05275, 05277, 05278
- Vehicle registration: HX
- Website: Hoexter.de

Höxter (German pronunciation: [ˈhœkstɐ]) is a town in eastern North Rhine-Westphalia, Germany on the left bank of the river Weser, 52 km (32 miles) north of Kassel. It lies in the heart of the Weser Uplands, and is the seat of the Höxter district. The district of Höxter has a population of 30,000, with the city itself making up around half of the population. Historical place names of Höxter are Hoxer and Huxaria.

== Subdivisions ==
As part of North Rhine-Westphalia's municipal reforms, the collective municipality of Höxter came into being on 1 January 1970, formed out of the eleven communities of the former Amt of Höxter-Land, the main town, and the community of Bruchhausen from the former Amt of Beverungen. The communities voluntarily merged to pool their resources and establish a unified administration. The constituent communities are:

- Albaxen
- Bosseborn
- Bödexen
- Brenkhausen
- Bruchhausen
- Fürstenau
- Godelheim
- Lüchtringen
- Lütmarsen
- Ottbergen
- Ovenhausen
- Stahle

== History ==
Höxter (Latin: Huxaria) in the time of Charlemagne was a villa regia, and was the scene of a battle between his forces and the Saxons. Under the protection of the Princely Abbey of Corvey it gradually increased in prosperity, and became the chief town of the principality of Corvey. Later it asserted its independence and joined the Hanseatic League.

Höxter was located on the long distance trade-route known as Hellweg. Rivalry with Corvey Abbey and the nearby town known as Corvey increased, and in 1265, the burghers of Höxter allied themselves with the Bishop of Paderborn. Their troops destroyed the town of Corvey and damaged the abbey.

Höxter was severely affected by the Thirty Years' War. In 1634, Imperial troops laid siege to the town in what became known as the Blutbad von Höxter (massacre of Höxter).

After the Peace of Westphalia in 1648, it was united with Brunswick; in 1802, it passed to Nassau, and in 1807 to the Kingdom of Westphalia, after the dismemberment of which in 1814, it came into the possession of Prussia.

In 2005, an explosion within a house in the historic town centre damaged the town hall and many other significant buildings and resulted in three deaths.

=== Albaxen ===
Albaxen had its first documentary mention, under the name Albachtessen, on the occasion of the neighbouring Corvey Abbey's founding in 822, and by 900, it was known by its current name. The Albaxen parish church was likewise first mentioned in the 9th century. The Tonenburg, a medieval building complex near Albaxen, was built in 1350 by Corvey Abbey.

=== Lüchtringen ===
In 854, Lüchtringen was first mentioned under the name Lutringi in Corvey Abbey's annals and belonged to the fourth archdeaconate of Höxter-Corvey of the Bishopric of Paderborn beginning in 1230. Before it became Prussian in 1813, Lüchtringen belonged to the Principality of Orange-Nassau in Fulda from 1803. In 1970, Lüchtringen lost its independence and became a constituent community of Höxter.

Lüchtringen is North Rhine-Westphalia's easternmost community.

== Population ==
Historical population

Year	Pop.	±% p.a.
1965	31,906	—
1970	32,830	+0.57%
1975	32,758	−0.04%
1980	32,423	−0.21%
1985	31,577	−0.53%
1990	33,079	+0.93%
1995	33,560	+0.29%

Year	Pop.	±% p.a.
2000	33,117	−0.27%
2005	32,591	−0.32%
2010	31,089	−0.94%
2015	29,589	−0.98%
2020	28,509	−0.74%
2025	27,908	−0.43%

Source: Landesdatabank Nordrhein-Westfalen

== Economy ==
The town's main manufactured products are linen, cotton, cement and gutta-percha latex, and shipping trade is a major source of income.

Höxter is a garrison town, and the presence of the military plays a large role in the local economy.

== Attractions ==
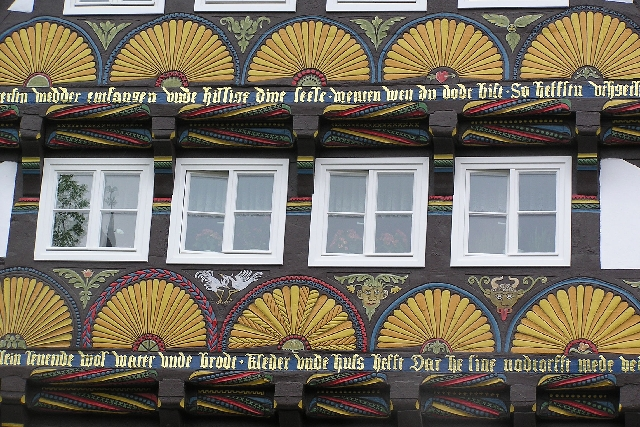
Half-timbering at the Haus Litto, Marktstraße 13

Höxter has a medieval town hall and historic houses with high gables and carved façades from the 15th and 16th centuries. Many of the buildings in this area were damaged or destroyed by the great explosion in 2005. Amongst the most well-known churches in Höxter is the Protestant church of Saint Kilian, with a pulpit dating from 1595 and a font dating from 1631. The Weser is crossed here by a stone bridge about 150 m in length, erected in 1833.

On the Brunsberg abutting the town is an old watchtower, said to be the remains of a fortress built by Widukind's brother Bruno.

Other attractions in Höxter include:

- The half-timbered old town, built in Weser Renaissance style. Notable among these are the Adam-und-Eva-Haus and the old Dechanei (Deacon's House) on the marketplace, featuring over 60 carved rosettes.
- Schloss Corvey, formerly Corvey Abbey, lies on Höxter's outskirts on the bank of the Weser. The abbey church has a Carolingian crypt as well as an imposing westwork. The poet Hoffmann von Fallersleben, who wrote Das Lied der Deutschen, worked in the abbey as a librarian and is buried next to the church.
- As part of the Erlebniswelt Renaissance ("Renaissance Adventure World"), there is a town walk with the theme "market", on which visitors may solve a murder case from 1617.
- The Obermühle Höxter ("Höxter Upper Mill") is a former watermill that once belonged to Corvey Abbey. Today it houses the Mühlencafé.

== Government ==
=== Town council ===
The town council's 38 seats (Gemeinderat), reduced from 44, are apportioned as follows, in accordance with municipal elections held on 13 September 2020:

- CDU: 17 seats
- SPD: 8 seats
- Greens: 4 seats
- BfH: 4 seats
- UWG (citizen's coalition): 3 seats
- DIE LINKE: 1 seat
- AfD: 1 seat

=== Mayor ===
The mayor is Daniel Hartmann, independent candidate (since 2020).

=== Coat of arms ===
Höxter's oldest known seals date from the 13th century. The current arms, showing an ecclesiastical structure, have been used since the 19th century, and are modelled after the second seal, known from 1285. The arms were granted once again in 1970.

== Twin towns – sister cities ==
Höxter is twinned with:

- Corbie, France (1963/1964)
- Sudbury, England, United Kingdom (1979/1980)

== Infrastructure ==
Höxter is served by four railway stations: Höxter Rathaus, Höxter-Ottbergen, Höxter-Lüchtringen and Höxter-Godelheim, all on the Altenbeken–Kreiensen line. The line is run by NordWestBahn who run the Egge-Bahn towards Paderborn and Holzminden. The Sollingbahn also terminates at Ottbergen, and links to Northeim in Lower Saxony.

All public transport in Höxter can be used on the integrated fare system within the Paderborn-Höxter Local Transport Association (Nahverkehrsverbund Paderborn-Höxter).

== Notable people ==
- Carl von Wedelstaedt (1864–1959), Lord mayor of Gelsenkirchen in 1919–1928
- Jacob Pins (1917–2005), Israeli artist who was born in Höxter, attended high school there, and emigrated in 1936
- Klaus Töpfer (born 1938), politician (CDU) and federal minister, came to Höxter as a child and was later named an Honorary Citizen of the city in 2011.
- Hans Christoph Becker-Foss (born 1949), conductor and organist
- Anja Niedringhaus (1965–2014), Pulitzer Prize-winning photojournalist
- Thomas von Heesen (born 1961), football player and manager
- Koray Günter (born 1994), footballer
