= Höxter (district) =

Coordinates: 51°40′N 9°15′E

- District
- Flag Coat of arms
- Country: Germany
- State: North Rhine-Westphalia
- Adm. region: Detmold
- Capital: Höxter

Government
  - District admin.: Michael Stickeln (CDU)

Area
  - Total: 1,201.42 km^{2} (463.87 sq mi)

Population (31 December 2025)
  - Total: 138,156
  - Density: 114.994/km^{2} (297.833/sq mi)
- Time zone: UTC+01:00 (CET)
  - Summer (DST): UTC+02:00 (CEST)
- Vehicle registration: HX, WAR
- Website: https://www.kreis-hoexter.de

Höxter (German pronunciation: [ˈhœkstɐ]) is a Kreis (district) in the east of North Rhine-Westphalia, Germany. Neighboring districts are Holzminden, Northeim, Kassel, Waldeck-Frankenberg, Hochsauerland, Paderborn, and Lippe.

== History ==
The area of the current Höxter district was part of the Bishopric of Paderborn until it was included into Prussia in 1802. In 1816 the new Prussian government created three districts in the area, Höxter, Brakel and Warburg. In 1832 Höxter and Brakel were merged.

The present district was created in 1975 when the former districts Warburg and Höxter were merged. At the same time the towns and municipalities in the district were merged to form today's ten towns.

== Geography ==
Geographically the district covers the hills east of the Teutoburg Forest, especially the Eggegebirge, and parts of the Weserbergland. The highest elevation is the Köterberg (Elevation 496 m). The main river is the Weser in the east of the district.

== Coat of arms ==
The lily in the bottom comes from the old coat of arms of the Warburg district, and is also found in the coat of arms of the city Warburg. The blue wave line stands for the river Weser, and the cross in the top derives from the coat of arms of the Bishopric of Paderborn.

== Towns and municipalities ==
Clickable map of towns and municipalities in the district

1. Bad Driburg (18,876)
2. Beverungen (12,595)
3. Borgentreich (8,454)
4. Brakel (16,152)
5. Höxter (27,908)
6. Marienmünster (4,758)
7. Nieheim (6,031)
8. Steinheim (12,000)
9. Warburg (23,210)
10. Willebadessen (8,172)
