= Detmold (administrative region) =

Coordinates: 52°0′N 8°45′E

- Regierungsbezirk
- Map of North Rhine-Westphalia highlighting Detmold
- Country: Germany
- State: North Rhine-Westphalia
- Region seat: Detmold

Government
  - District President: Anna Bölling (CDU)

Area
  - Total: 6,518.14 km^{2} (2,516.67 sq mi)

Population (31 December 2025)
  - Total: 2,065,679
  - Density: 316.912/km^{2} (820.799/sq mi)

GDP
  - Total: €98.053 billion (2024)
  - Per capita: €47,323 (2024)
- Website: www.brdt.nrw.de

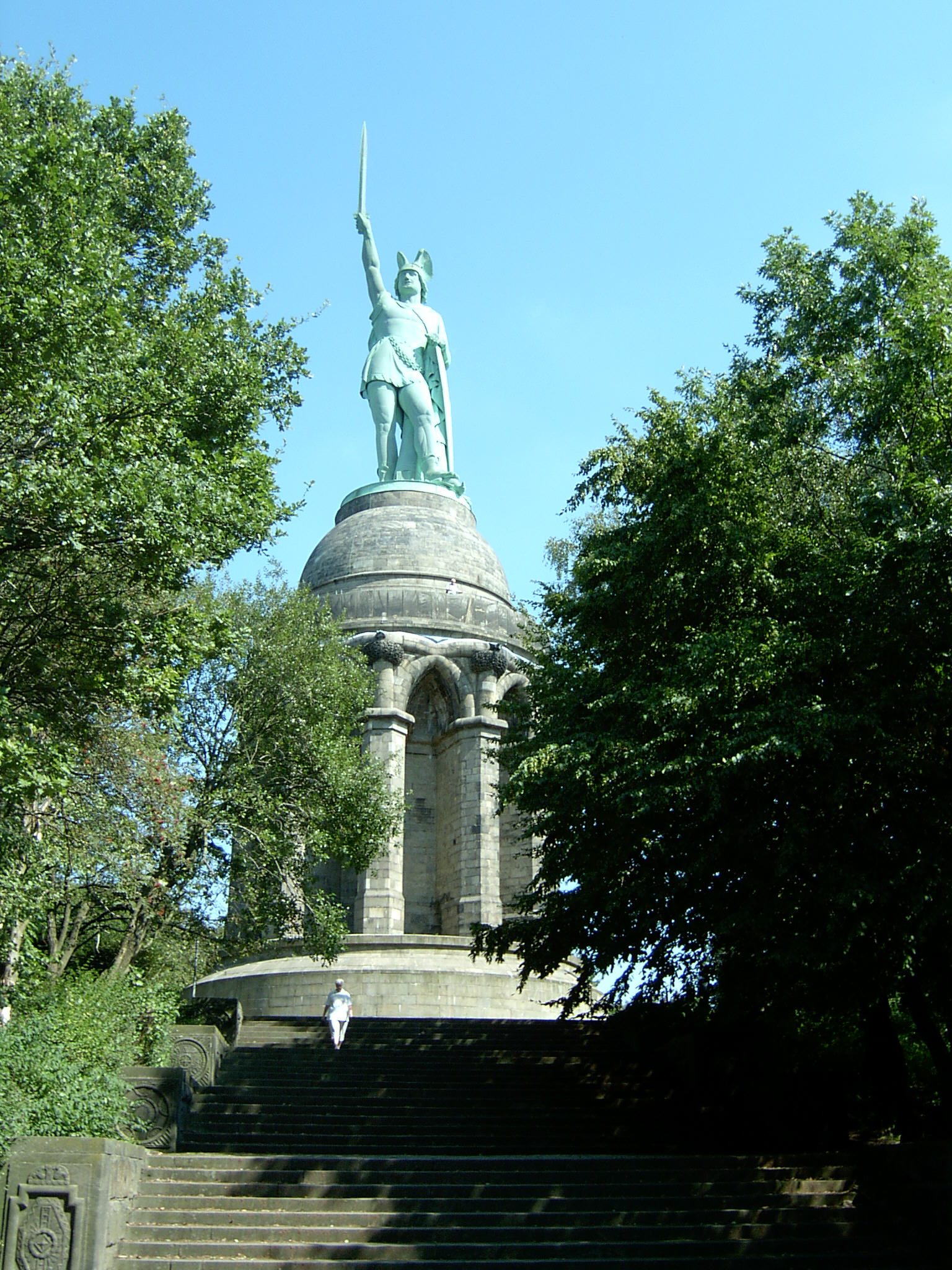
Hermann monument near Detmold

Detmold (German pronunciation: [ˈdɛtmɔlt]) is one of the five Regierungsbezirke of North Rhine-Westphalia, Germany, located in the north-east of the state. It is congruent with the (cultural) region of Ostwestfalen-Lippe (OWL, East Westphalia–Lippe).

The Regierungsbezirk was created in 1947 when the former state of Lippe was incorporated into North Rhine-Westphalia by merging the former Regierungsbezirk Minden with the territory of the Free State of Lippe. The Regierungsbezirk Minden dates back to 1815, when the class of administrative regions Regierungsbezirke was initially created.

== Location ==
The Regierungsbezirk Detmold is located in the north-east of North Rhine-Westphalia and therefore it forms the area where the German low mountains are divided from the North German Plain. As the Regierungsbezirk has an expanse of circa 6,500 km^{2}, it is one fifth of the area of North Rhine-Westphalia. North and east of the Regierungsbezirk is the German state of Lower Saxony, south there is the state of Hesse. At the western border is the Regierungsbezirk of Arnsberg and the Regierungsbezirk of Münster.

== Administration ==
The administration is located in Detmold in the district of Lippe.

=== Administrative divisions ===
The Regierungsbezirk consists of six districts with 69 municipalities, and of one district-free city.

Kreise
(districts)
1. Gütersloh
2. Herford
3. Höxter
4. Lippe
5. Minden-Lübbecke
6. Paderborn
Kreisfreie Städte
(district-free cities)
1. Bielefeld

== History ==
The Regierungsbezirk Detmold has two historical roots:

- the East Westphalian part (almost 80% of the area) belonged to the former Prussian Province of Westphalia and there it formed the unit of the Regierungsbezirk Minden. In 1946 the Prussian Province formed the new state of North Rhine-Westphalia along with the northern Rhineland.
- the region roughly around the today's district of Lippe was called Land Lippe until 1947 and it was a separate German State just like Prussia. Until 1918 it had been a principality (Fürstentum), then a Free State (Freistaat) and so it has a different historical background than East Westphalia.

== Economy ==
The gross domestic product (GDP) of the region was 77.7 billion € in 2018, accounting for 2.3% of German economic output. GDP per capita adjusted for purchasing power was 34,700 € or 115% of the EU27 average in the same year. The GDP per employee was 97% of the EU average.

== Sports ==
Arminia Bielefeld is the most popular sports club in the region. In the 2025–26 season, Arminia recorded an average home attendance of 26,143 across 17 matches at the Bielefelder Alm, the ninth-highest average in the 2. Bundesliga.
