= Warendorf Railway =

Railway line in Germany

Münster–Rheda-Wiedenbrück
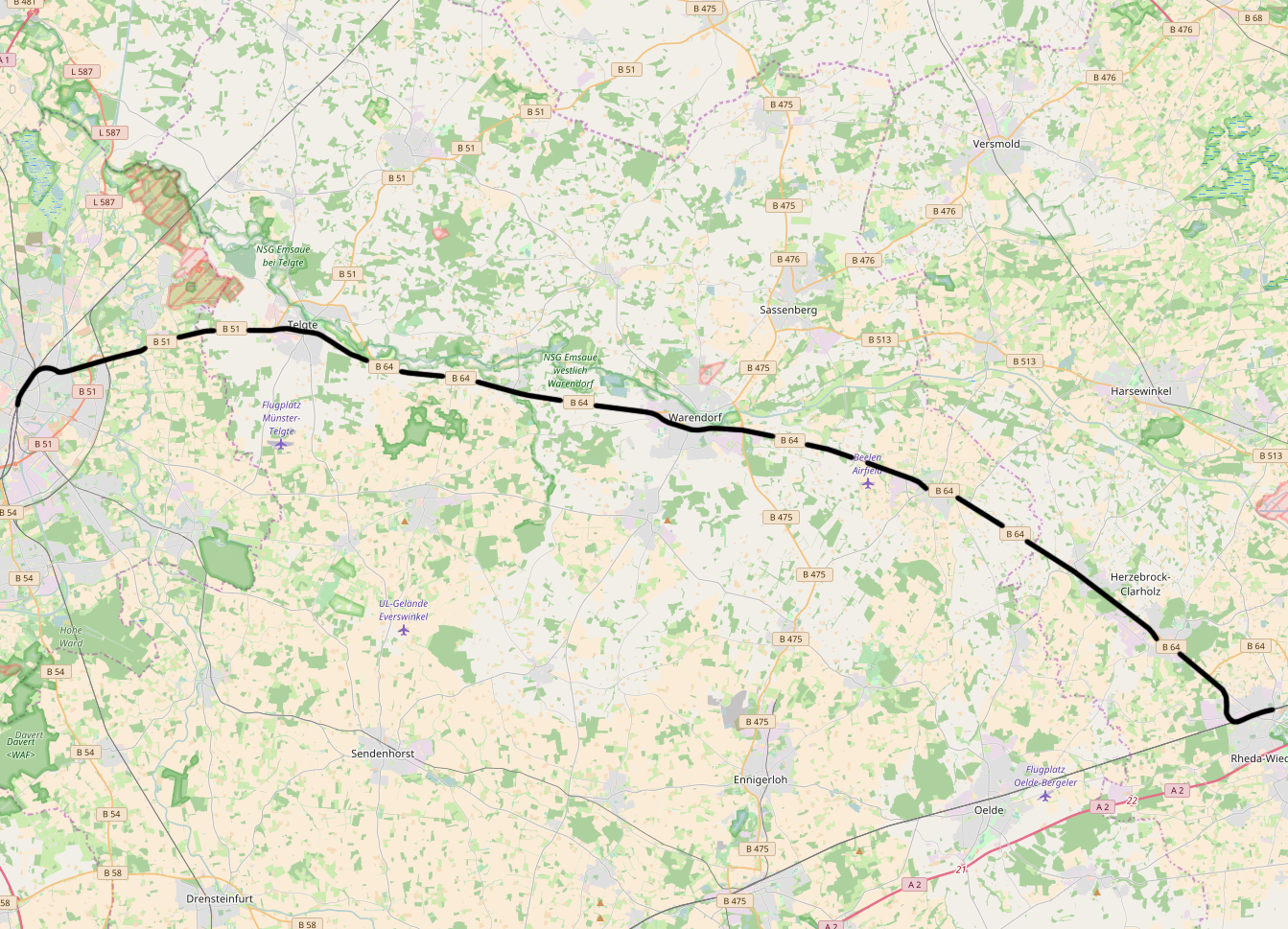

Overview
- Line number: 2013
- Locale: North Rhine-Westphalia, Germany

Service
- Route number: 406

Technical
- Line length: 50 km (31 mi)
- Track gauge: 1,435 mm (4 ft 8 1/2 in) standard gauge
- Operating speed: 100 km/h (62.1 mph) (maximum)

Rheda-Wiedenbrück–Lippstadt

Overview
- Line number: 2951

Service
- Route number: 207

Technical
- Line length: 24 km (15 mi)
- Track gauge: 1,435 mm (4 ft 8 1/2 in) standard gauge

The Warendorf Railway (German: Warendorfer Bahn) is a single-track branch line from Münster via Warendorf to Rheda-Wiedenbrück in the German state of North Rhine-Westphalia. It is now served by a train that continues from Rheda-Wiedenbrück to Bielefeld. The line is a section of the former Münster–Rheda–Lippstadt railway and is now operated as part of Deutsche Bahn’s Münster-Ostwestfalen regional network, based in Münster. According to Deutsche Bahn it was the most accident-prone railway line in Germany before 2013.

== History ==
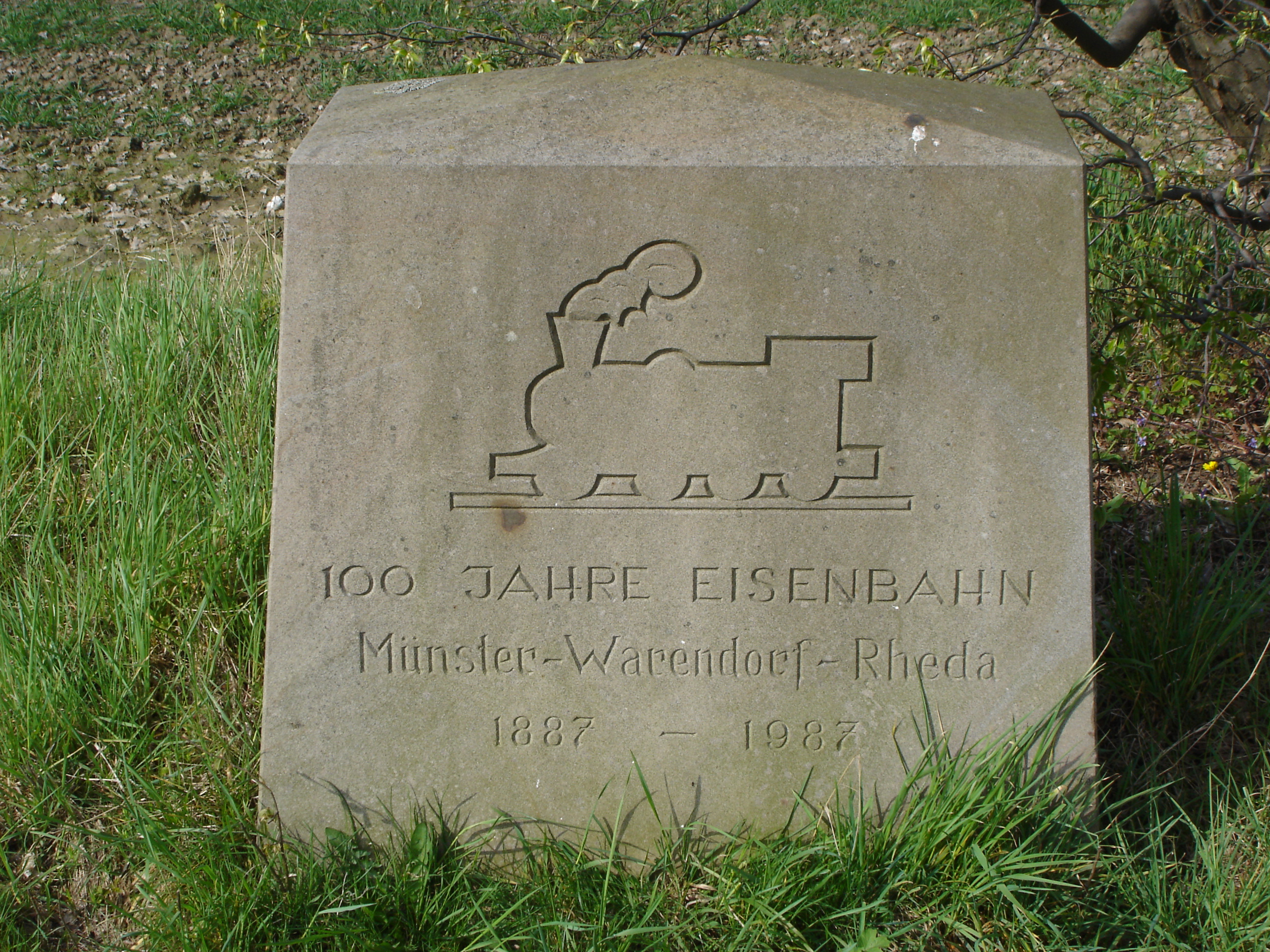
Stone commemorating 100 years of the Warendorf Railway between Müssingen and Warendorf

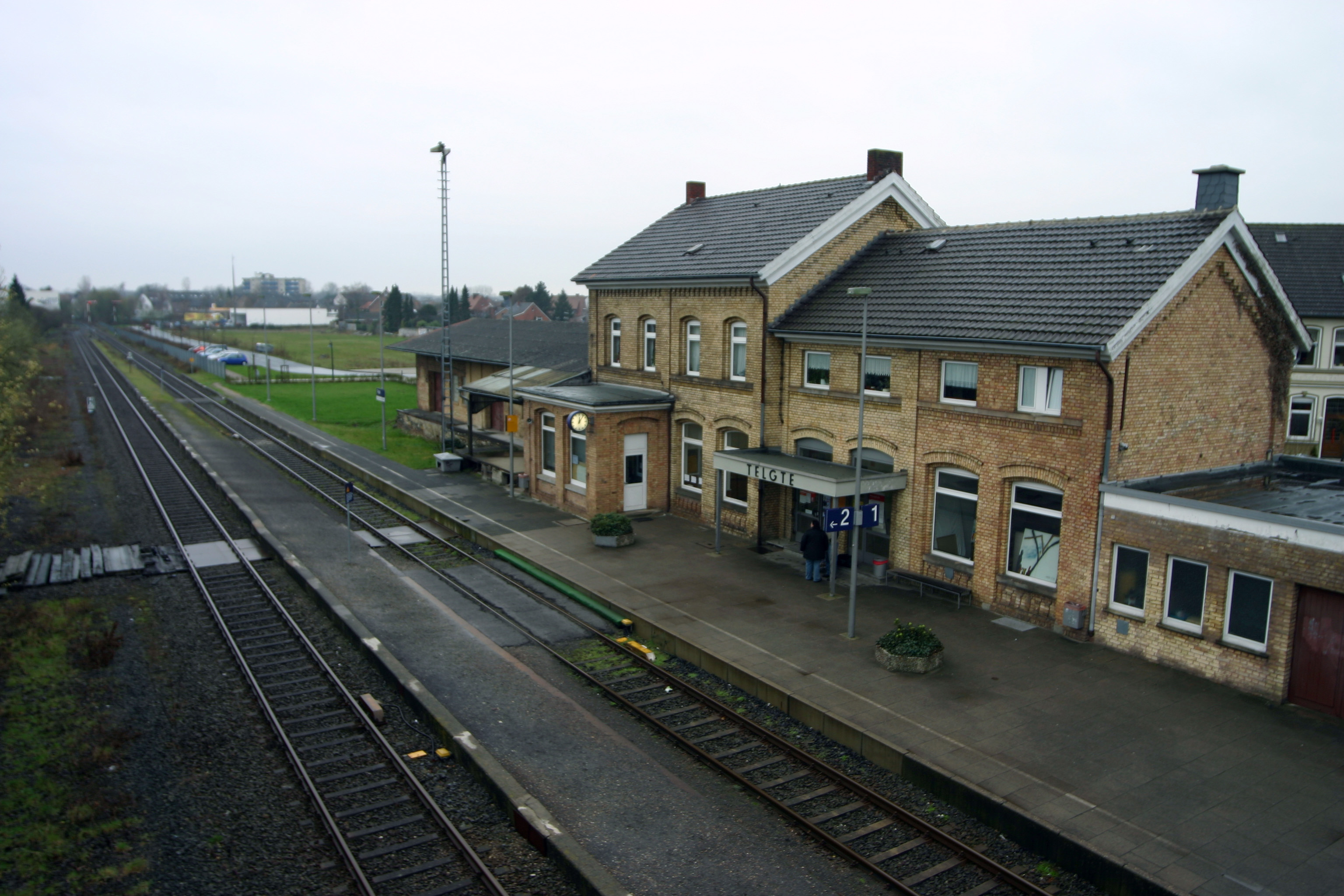
Telgte station

After initially being planned as a narrow-gauge railway from Münster to Telgte, a standard-gauge railway was built from Münster via Warendorf and Rheda to Lippstadt. Services began operating between Munster and Warendorf on 10 February 1887 and from Warendorf to Rheda on 25 June 1887.

In the early 1980s, Deutsche Bundesbahn wanted to close sections of the line because of its inefficiency. However, Peter Strüber und Jochen Sänger of Rheda-Wiedenbrück thwarted this with a cross-party political and local alliance.

Until the timetable change of December 2013, the line was operated by NordWestBahn, but it is now operated by eurobahn.

In December 2016, the Warendorf-Einen/Müssingen halt was completed in the Warendorf urban area and the Raestrup-Everswinkel station was closed. The tracks in the area of the station had to be re-routed to create sufficient space for the new level crossing safety system.

=== Rheda Railway ===
The "Rheda Railway" (Rhedaer Bahn) refers to the line from Rheda via Wiedenbrück, Langenberg, Bad Waldliesborn to Lippstadt. The last passenger train ran on the line on 30 November 1979. The transport of freight between Langenberg and Lippstadt was abandoned on 16 June 1983 and the track was dismantled in 1985. Freight traffic ended between Wiedenbrück Süd and Langenberg on 1 December 1994 and the section was closed on 30 November 1995. Freight traffic was abandoned on the remaining part of the line on 31 December 2000 and the line was closed on 1 May 2001. Since 2006, the Westfälische Localbahn (Westphalian Local Railway) has tried to reactivate the line as a museum railway, although the line is not currently licensed for rail operations by the Federal Railway Authority. The city of Rheda-Wiedenbrück built a cycle path on the old route in 2009. Parts of the line have now been dismantled.

== Route ==
A large part of the line runs along federal highway 64. A variety of mostly ungated level crossings means that there is a low line speed of up to 60 km/h. Shortly before Rheda-Wiedenbrück station the Warendorf Railway passes under the Hamm–Minden Railway and thus does not connect to its passenger tracks, but has its own platform on the freight tracks, so that it to could connect with the Rheda Railway without crossing the main line on the level.

The line speed between Warendorf and Beelen was increased to 100 km/h from the 2006/07 timetable change. This required numerous alterations to the track and the elimination of, or the upgrade of technology at, numerous level crossings. At the same time Vohren station was closed.

In October 2009, the section between Münster and Warendorf was partially renewed and the line between Munster and Beelen was connected to the electronic signalling centre in Coesfeld, while the Beelen–Rheda section was connected later. This now controls all operations on the line, replacing individual signalmen at turnouts and crossing guards. In the course of the upgrade the outdated mechanical interlockings were demolished at Telgte, Warendorf and Beelen stations.

At the end of August 2011, further sections of the line and the ballast bed between Münster and Warendorf were completely renewed.

== Rail services ==
The Warendorf Railway is served by Regionalbahn service RB 67 (Der Warendorfer) from Münster to Bielefeld every hour, but on Sundays it runs only every two hours between Warendorf and Bielefeld. The service continues from Bielefeld as Regionalbahn service RB 71 (Ravensberger Bahn) to Rahden. Therefore, passengers normally do not have to change on this route.

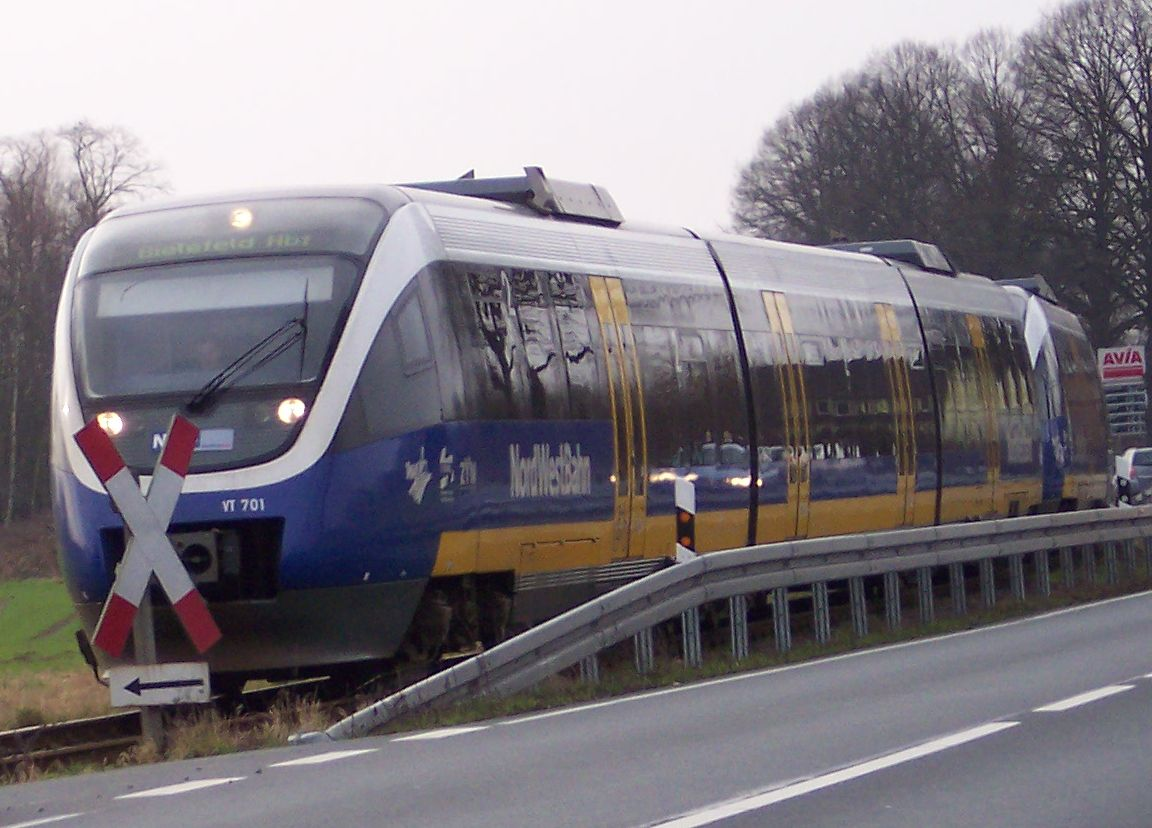
Service of the NordWestBahn near Raestrup-Everswinkel

The trains cross in Beelen and hourly also in Telgte. Under the timetable, services miss a connection in Brackwede with RB 74 (Senne-Bahn) services towards Paderborn. The hourly service over the entire route was introduced for the first time at the 2006/07 timetable change. Previously, the section between Warendorf and Rheda-Wiedenbrück was operated primarily at two-hour intervals. There was already an hourly service between Münster and Warendorf. It was necessary to increase the line speed between Warendorf and Beelen from 60 km/h to 100 km/h to make the increased frequency possible.

Services are operated by eurobahn on behalf of the Verkehrsverbundes OstWestfalenLippe (East Westphalia-Lippe Transport Association) and the Zweckverbandes SPNV Münsterland (Münsterland Public Transport Association), using Bombardier Talent railcars of DB class 643. The average speed is 50 km/h.

== Fares ==
The line is located in the area of the fare association Westfalen-Tarif

All forms of public transport is covered by the following fare systems:

- in Münster and in Warendorf district by the Münsterland-Tarif (fares) of the Verkehrsgemeinschaft Münsterland (Transport Community of Münsterland)
- in the districts of Gütersloh and Lippe and in the city of Bielefeld by the Sechser-Tarif (“the six” fares) of the Zweckverband Verkehrsverbund OWL (transport association of Ostwestfalen-Lippe)
- between Warendorf and Rheda-Wiedenbrück by transitional fares under each fare scheme
- and collectively under the NRW-tariff (fares) of North Rhine-Westphalia.
