= Lippstadt station =

Railway station in Lippstadt, Germany

Lippstadt
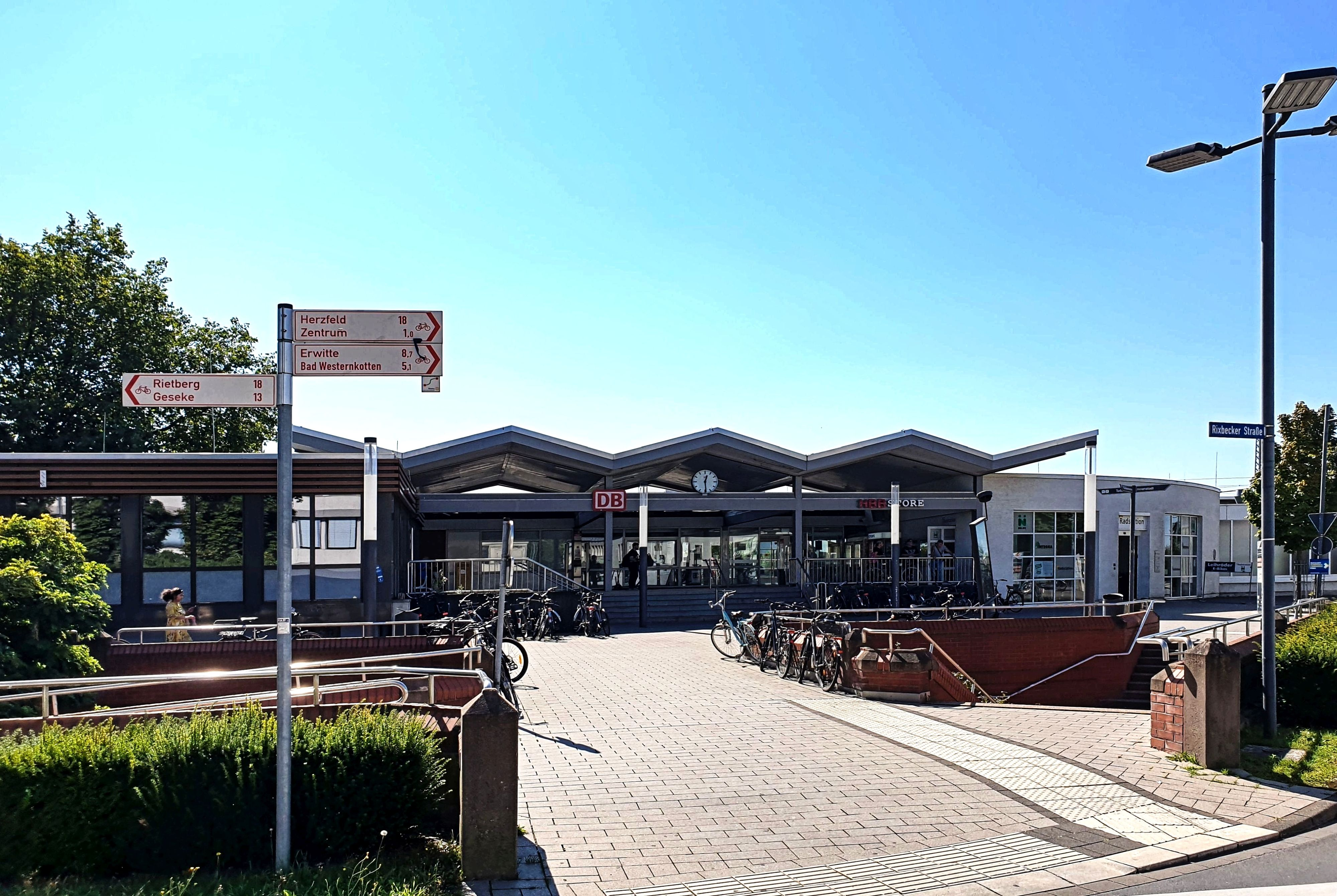

General information
- Location: Rixbeckerstr. 2, Lippstadt, NRW; Germany
- Coordinates: 51°40′14.46″N 8°20′55.62″E
- Lines: Hamm–Warburg (KBS 430); Münster–Warstein (KBS ex 222e/ex 232p); Lippstadt–Rheda (KBS ex 207, closed)
- Platforms: 3

Construction
- Accessible: Yes

Other information
- Station code: 3746
- DS100 code: ELPP
- IBNR: 8000571
- Category: 4
- Fare zone: Westfalentarif: 49161
- Website: www.bahnhof.de

History
- Opened: 4 October 1850; 175 years ago

Services
Preceding station	DB Fernverkehr	Following station
Soest towards Köln Hbf	IC 51	Paderborn Hbf towards Gera Hbf
Preceding station	National Express Germany	Following station
Soest towards Düsseldorf Hbf	RE 11 (Rhein-Hellweg-Express)	Paderborn Hbf towards Kassel-Wilhelmshöhe
Preceding station		Following station
Bad Sassendorf towards Münster Hbf	RB 89	Dedinghausen towards Warburg
Location

Lippstadt station is a stop for long-distance services on the Mid-Germany Railway (German: Mitte-Deutschland-Verbindung) in the town of Lippstadt in the district of Soest, in the German state of North Rhine-Westphalia. It is on the Hamm–Warburg and the Munster–Warstein railways. Until 1979, the Rheda Railway also branched off to Rheda.

== Services ==
Lippstadt is served once a day by the IC 51 Intercity service from Düsseldorf to Gera and return. It is served by the Rhein-Hellweg-Express at hourly intervals and the RB 89 (Ems-Börde-Bahn) stopping service every 30 minutes. The NRW-Express is operated by National Express Germany and the Ems-Börde-Bahn is operated by Eurobahn (Keolis).

Line	Line name	Route
IC 51	Mitte-Deutschland-Verbindung	Düsseldorf – Hamm – Lippstadt – Paderborn – Kassel – Erfurt – Gera
RE 11	Rhein-Hellweg-Express	Düsseldorf – Düsseldorf Airport – Duisburg – Essen – Dortmund – Hamm – Lippstadt – Paderborn – Kassel
RB 89	Ems-Börde-Bahn	Münster (Westf) – Hamm – Lippstadt – Paderborn – Warburg

== History ==
The main line between Hamm and Paderborn was opened on 4 October 1850 by the Royal Westphalian Railway Company (Königlich-Westfälische Eisenbahn, KWE). The extension to Warburg was opened in 1853. The line from Munster to Warstein was opened on 31 October 1883. The line to Rheda followed a few years later. Operations on the north-south route of the Westfälische Landes-Eisenbahn (Westphalian State Railway) between Münster and Warstein was closed in two stages for passenger services up to 1975. Today it is used purely as a freight line. In 1979, passenger services were finally closed to Rheda. This line is now abandoned and largely dismantled. The Lippstadt-Nord station on the line to Beckum/Neubeckum was completely demolished in 1987 (station building, freight shed, loading ramp, rail tracks) and only the now non-functional signal box, which was built in 1910, and the main track survive. The headquarters of the Westfälische Landes-Eisenbahn along with its local freight terminal and central workshop are also near the former Lippstadt-Nord station.

== Connections ==
The station is located just south of central Lippstadt and the pedestrian zone. Opposite the station is the central bus station, where there is access to the city and regional bus lines, as well as to express bus line S60 to Warstein.

== Station building ==
The station building is a functional building from the seventies. It houses a DB ticket office, a DB Service-Store, a bicycle parking facility, toilets and a fast food restaurant.

== Access ==
The station has barrier-free access to platform 1 and the entrance building via ramps, platforms tracks 2 and 3 are accessible by lift. Platform 1 is equipped with a tactile guidance system for the visually impaired.

== Regional transport association ==
The town of Lippstadt is part of the Verkehrsgemeinschaft Ruhr-Lippe (transport community of Westphalia-Lippe).
