= Rb 74 =

Rb 74, RB 74, Rb-74 or Rb.74 may refer to:

- Rubidium-74, an isotope of rubidium
- The Swedish designation for the AIM-9L Sidewinder air-to-air missile
- The Swedish designation for the AIM-9M Sidewinder air-to-air missile
- Service designation for the Senne Railway
- A regional railway route in Bavaria
- A regional railway route in Baden-Württemberg
- A regional railway route in Berlin and Brandenburg
- BAE Wolf, a tugboat in the Ecuadorian Navy
