= Hamm–Warburg railway =

Railway line in Germany

Hamm–Warburg

Overview
- Line number: 2930 (Hamm–Soest); 1760 (Soest–Altenbeken); 2970 (Altenbeken–Warburg)
- Locale: North Rhine-Westphalia, Germany

Service
- Route number: 430

Technical
- Line length: 131 km (81 mi)
- Track gauge: 1,435 mm (4 ft 8 1/2 in) standard gauge
- Electrification: 15 kV/16.7 Hz AC overhead catenary
- Operating speed: Hamm–Paderborn: 200 km/h (124.3 mph); Paderborn–Warburg: 160 km/h (99.4 mph) (maximum)

The Hamm–Warburg railway is a 131 km long main line railway in the German state of North Rhine-Westphalia. It is part of an east-west line, known as the Mid-Germany Connection (German: Mitte-Deutschland-Verbindung), and is served by InterCity trains between the Ruhr and Kassel, Erfurt and Berlin. In addition, there are dense freight and regional services. The line was opened between 1850 and 1853 and is one of the oldest railways in Germany.

The most important stops are in Soest, Lippstadt and Paderborn. Altenbeken station is also a major point for train connections. In Warburg the line connects with the line to Kassel. Between Hamm and Paderborn the track allows speeds of up to 200 km/h.

== Route ==
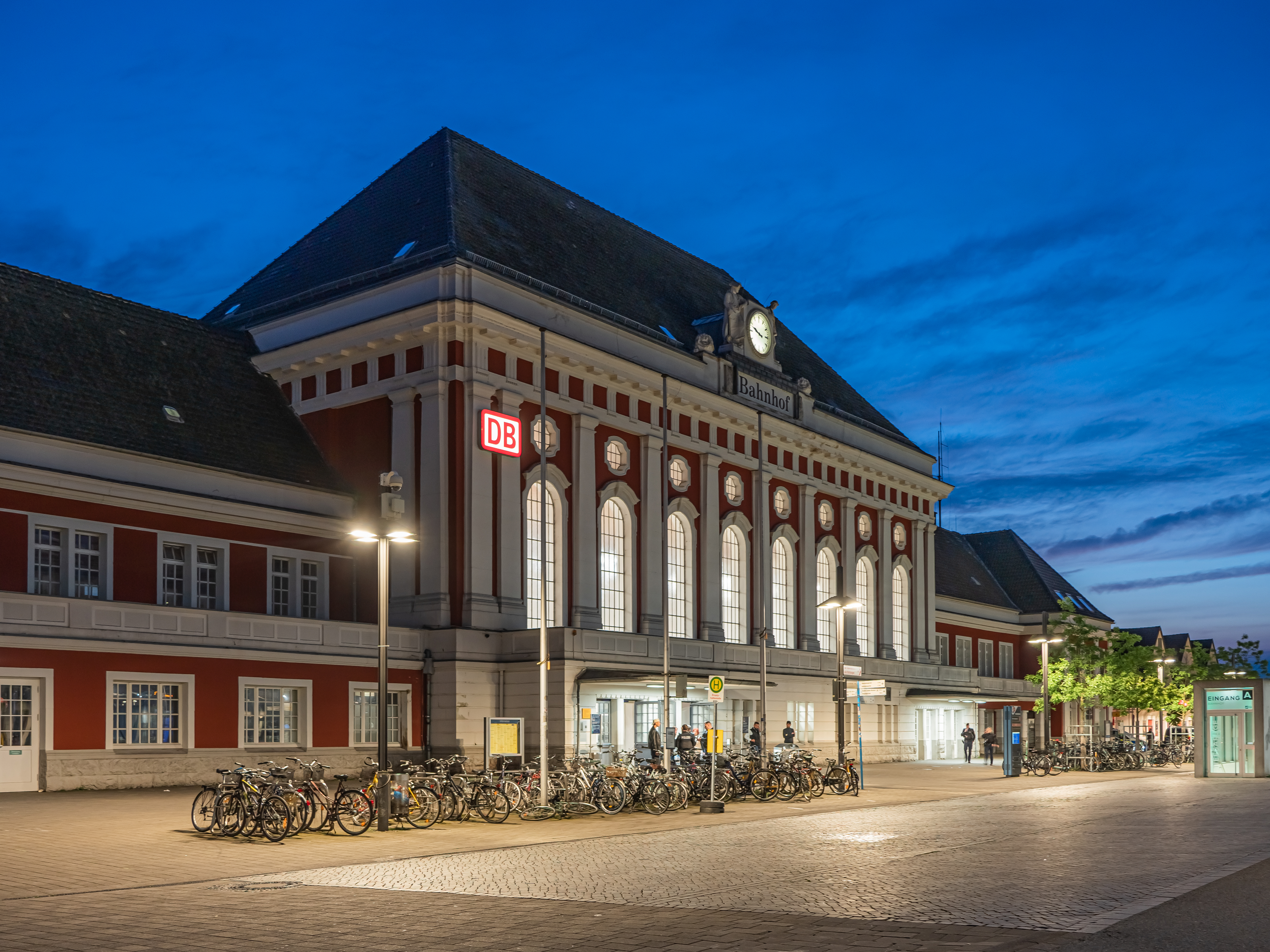
Hamm station

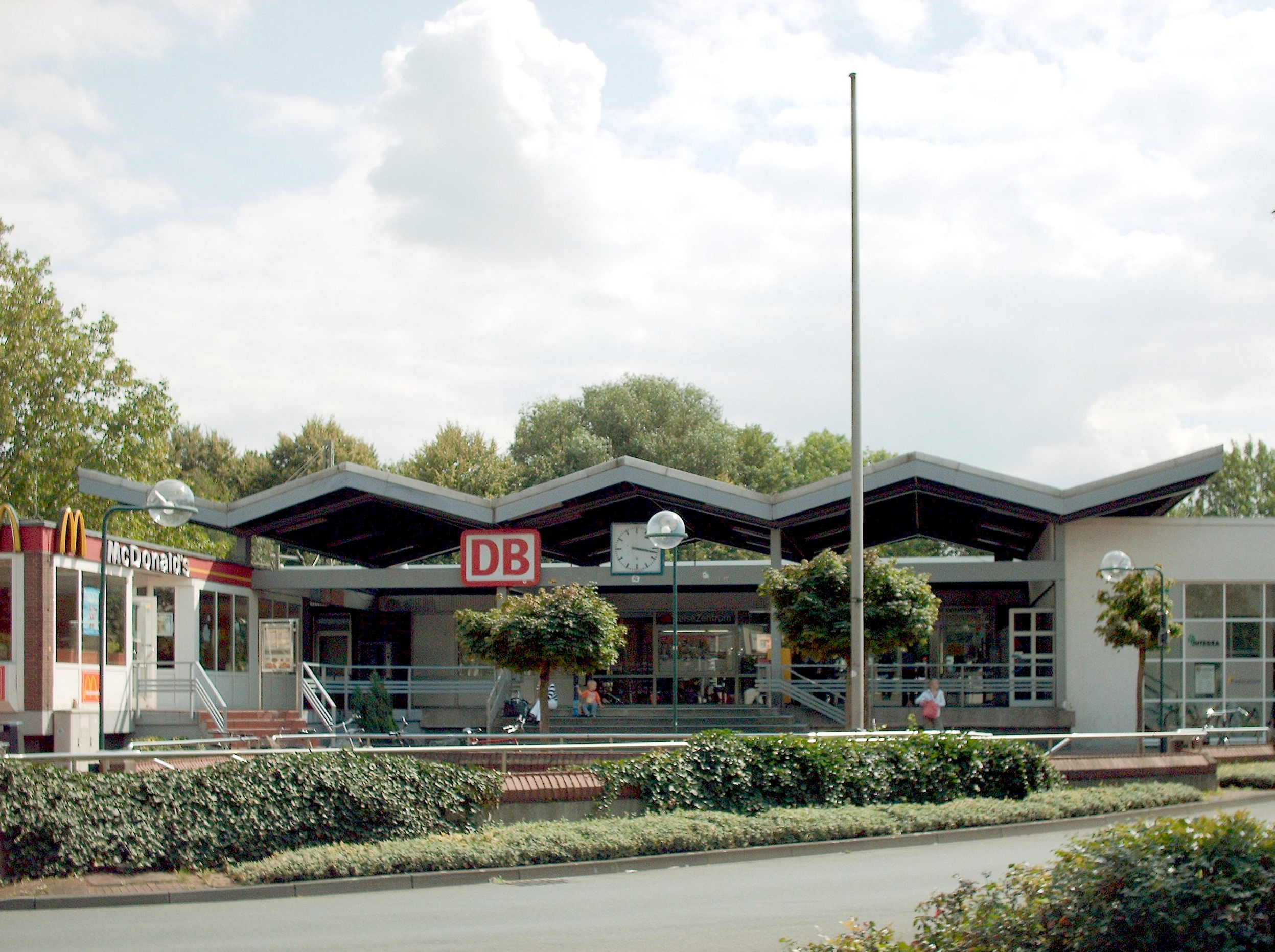
Lippstadt station

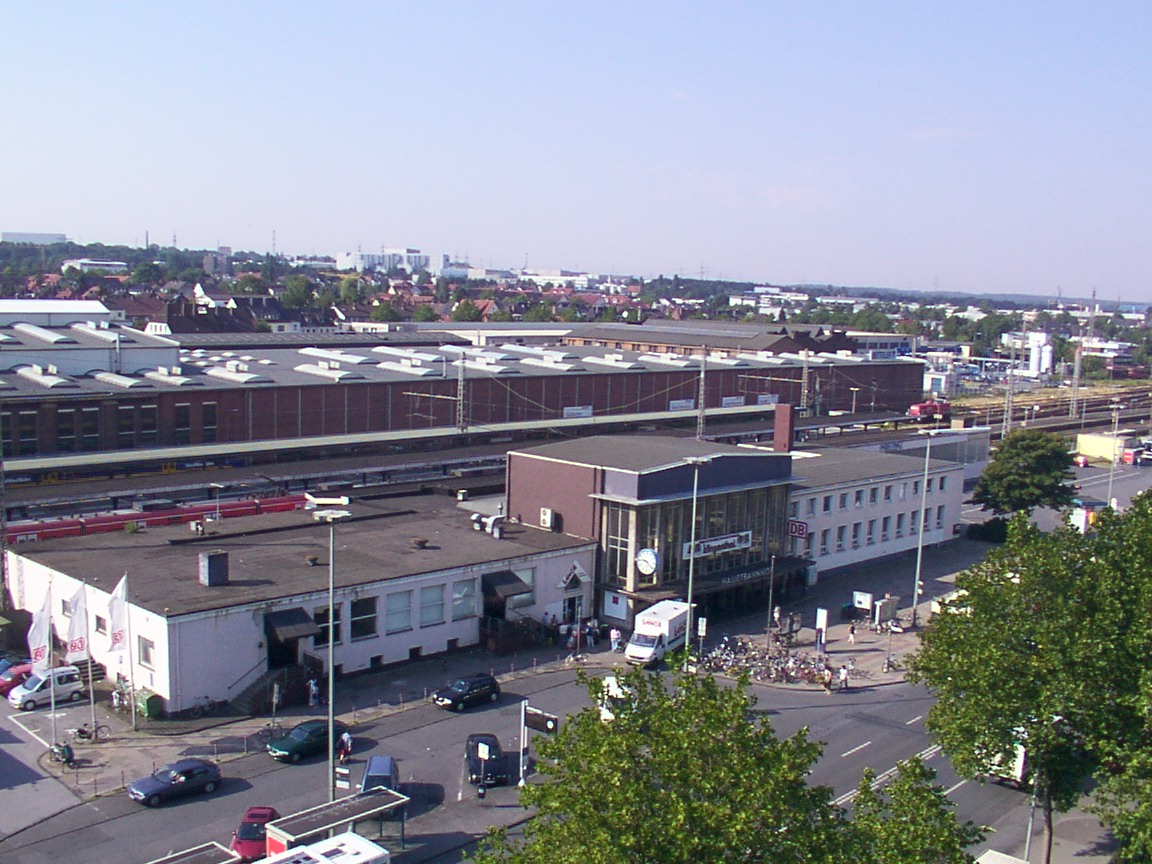
Paderborn Hauptbahnhof

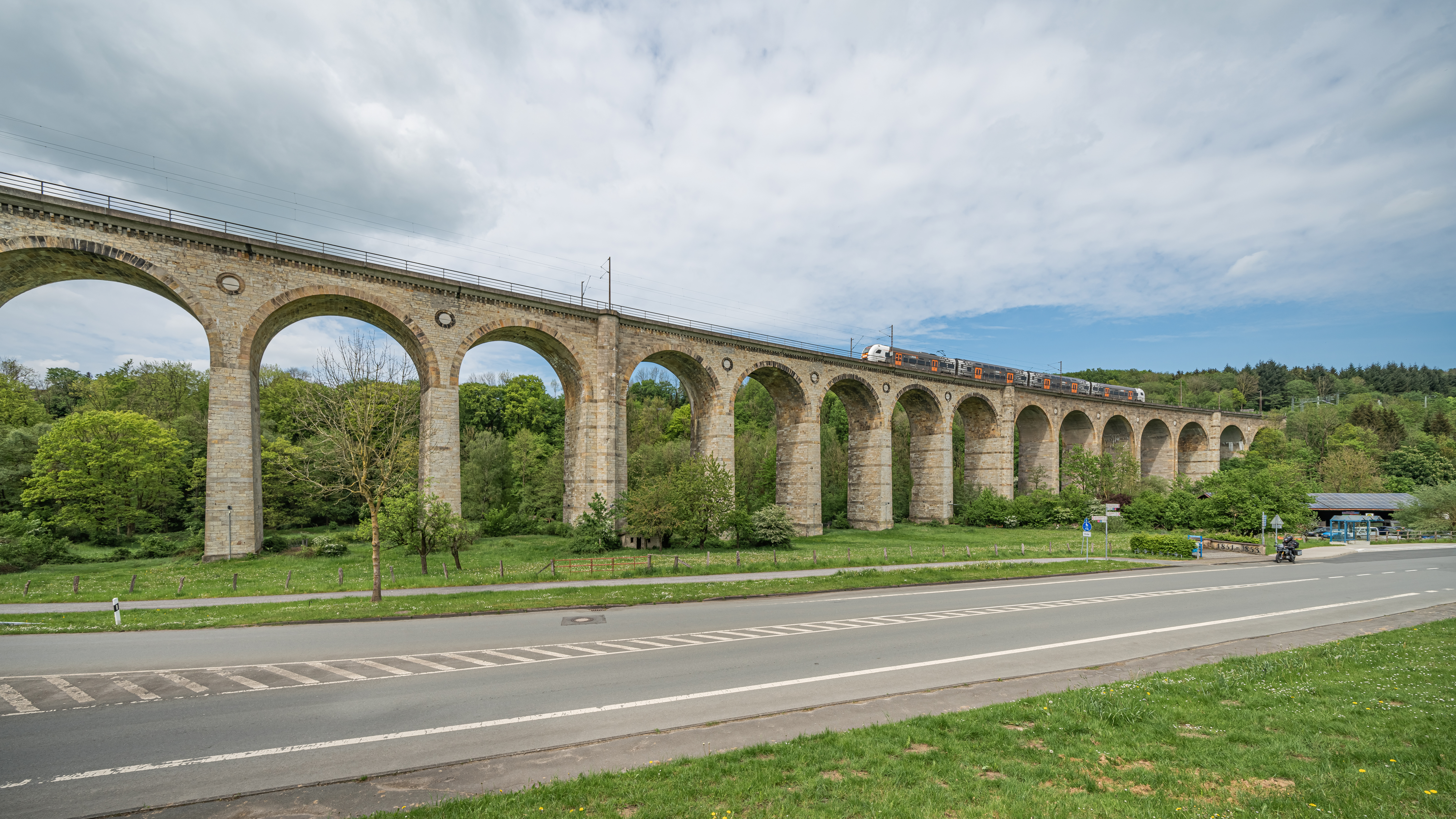
Altenbeken Viaduct

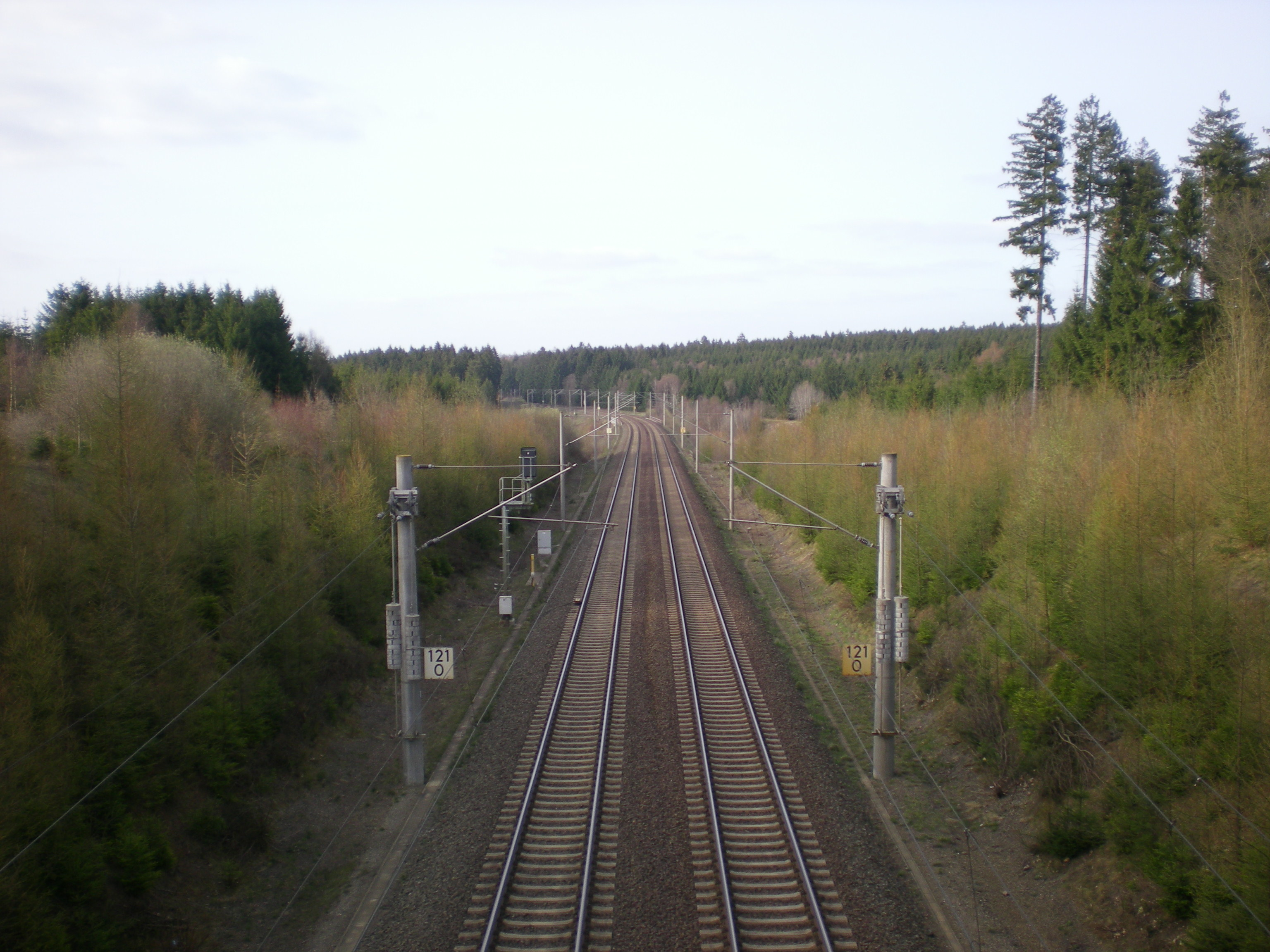
Beginning of the realignment near Herbram-Wald (km 121.0)

The line from Hamm to Paderborn is relatively flat as it runs through the southern Westphalian Lowland to the east. It runs roughly parallel to the Lippe river and the historic Hellweg, the precursor of highway B 1. In Soest, it is joined by the line from Hagen. From there it goes on via Bad Sassendorf, Lippstadt, Geseke and Salzkotten to Paderborn.

From Paderborn the route has the character of a low mountain railway. The line runs up a long slope over the viaducts near Neuenbeken and Altenbeken to reach Altenbeken junction in the north-west of the Eggegebirge range. It connects to lines to Hanover and Kreiensen at a triangular junction.

From Altenbeken the route turns southeast and passes through the new Egge tunnel to Willebadessen. The dismantled Holzminden–Scherfede line also ran through the now closed Nörde station and there used to be a connection between the lines. The line meets the Upper Ruhr Valley line shortly before Warburg (here running through the valley of the Diemel). The line finishes in Warburg, continuing as the Kassel–Warburg line (originally built as part of the Frederick William Northern Railway) to Kassel.

== History ==
The construction of this line was agreed by the then independent states of Prussia and Electorate of Hesse (Kurhessen). The line connects Westphalia, then a Prussian province and Kurhessen, which lay between Westphalia and the Prussian heartland. The agreed route between Paderborn and Willebadessen ran on a direct route via Lichtenau. However, Prussia had awarded the concession to build the line in its territory to the private Cologne-Minden-Thuringian Connection Railway Company (Köln-Minden-Thüringischen-Verbindungs-Eisenbahn-Gesellschaft, KMTVEG). The cost of constructing the line, especially its 600-metre-long tunnel through the Eggegebirge overwhelmed the company and it filed for bankruptcy in 1848. The Prussian government-owned Royal Westphalian Railway Company took on the project and the tunnel was replaced by an above-ground deviation via Altenbeken and the line was opened in stages from 1850 to 1853:

- Hamm–Paderborn, 1 October 1850
- Warburg–border, 28 March 1851
- Paderborn–Warburg, 22 July 1853

Together with the Frederick William Northern Railway and the Thuringian Railway, it formed a continuous route between Westphalia and Halle/Leipzig via Erfurt, avoiding the territory of the Kingdom of Hanover. Over the next quarter of a century this route was further shortened by the opening of the Halle–Kassel line (via Nordhausen, completed in 1872) and the Solling Railway (via Northeim, opened in 1878).

The line has since become an important east–west link. Freight traffic prior to 1945, however, mostly left the line at Altenbeken to run to Halle and Leipzig via Northeim and Nordhausen.

After the Second World War, north–south traffic increased to such an extent that the Hanoverian Southern line (Hanover–Göttingen–Kassel) was overloaded. To relieve this traffic, a connection curve was established in 1958 in Altenbeken to enable Hanover–Kassel trains to run without reversing.

In December 1970, electrification of the line from Hamm via Warburg to Kassel was completed and travel time of luxury express trains (D-Züge) was shortened from 156 to 140 minutes. Since not enough heavy electric locomotives were available, goods trains were hauled until 1973 by class 44 steam locomotives.

Because of a landslide between Willebadessen and Neuenheerse in the spring of 1988, the section between Altenbeken and Warburg was blocked for weeks and long-distance trains were diverted on to the Göttingen–Bodenfelde line.

The line was selected for upgrading in the 1985 Federal Transport Infrastructure Plan. This mainly involved the upgrading of existing lines west of Paderborn. The first works in the Hamm–Paderborn section began in the early 1990s, consisting particularly of the elimination of level crossings. In 1993 and 1994, the Soest–Paderborn section was completely closed in order to upgrade the section to allow operations at 200 km/h. Trains were during this period diverted on to the Senne Railway between Soest and Paderborn. By 2007, however, not all crossings had yet been replaced, so trains could only run at 200 km/h on short sections. Between Paderborn and Warburg and on the rest of the line to Kassel extensive realignment is needed. An important step was taken with the new Egge tunnel at Willebadessen in 2003. In December 2003, Willebadessen station was reopened.

== Operations ==
Express trains long dominated long-distance services on the route. Through coaches were often attached and detached to trains, mainly in Soest and Altenbeken, to enable passengers to reach many destinations without changing trains. During the division of Germany interzonal trains also ran over the line between East and West German, including trains between Mönchengladbach and Leipzig and between Düsseldorf and Karl-Marx-Stadt. From 1973, the Deutsche Bundesbahn (German Federal Railways) tried to add branch lines to its successful InterCity network. Three pairs of trains operated between the Ruhr and Bebra to complement the intercity system. But they did not stimulate the expected demand and were cancelled for the summer 1976 timetable.

From 1990, Deutsche Bundesbahn, introduced the new InterRegio (IR) service in an attempt to attract new customers, with fast trains at regular intervals with short travel times and superior comfort. The IR trains ran first at two-hour frequencies from Duisburg via Hamm and Warburg to Bebra. As a result of German reunification a little later, IR line 20 was extended to the east via Thuringia to Chemnitz.

With the abolition of IR services from 2002, IR trains on the Mid-Germany Connection were rebranded as InterCity (IC) services. In the 2002–2007 period, up to three pairs of ICE T tilting trains ran on the line. In the 2009 timetable change individual IC train pairs were introduced, so there is no longer a regular interval service between Düsseldorf and Stralsund.

Regional services on the route consist of the Ems-Börde-Bahn (RB 89) Regionalbahn service. RB 89 runs every half-hour between Paderborn and Hamm. Every two hours RB 89 services continue past Paderborn to Warburg. On weekends this two-hourly service does not stop at Borgeln, Dedinghausen, Ehringshausen and Scharmede. The route is served by Eurobahn with four-car Stadler FLIRT multiple units.

Regional-Express services have operated on the Düsseldorf–Hamm–Paderborn route since December 2010 with the designation of line RE 1 (NRW-Express), replacing services of the Rhein-Hellweg-Express. The Regional-Express service runs from Monday to Friday every two hours, taking the same time as IC trains. Between Hamm and Paderborn RE 11 services stop, like IC services, only at Soest and Lippstadt.
