= Soest station (Germany) =

Passenger station in Soest, North Rhine-Westphalia, Germany

Soest
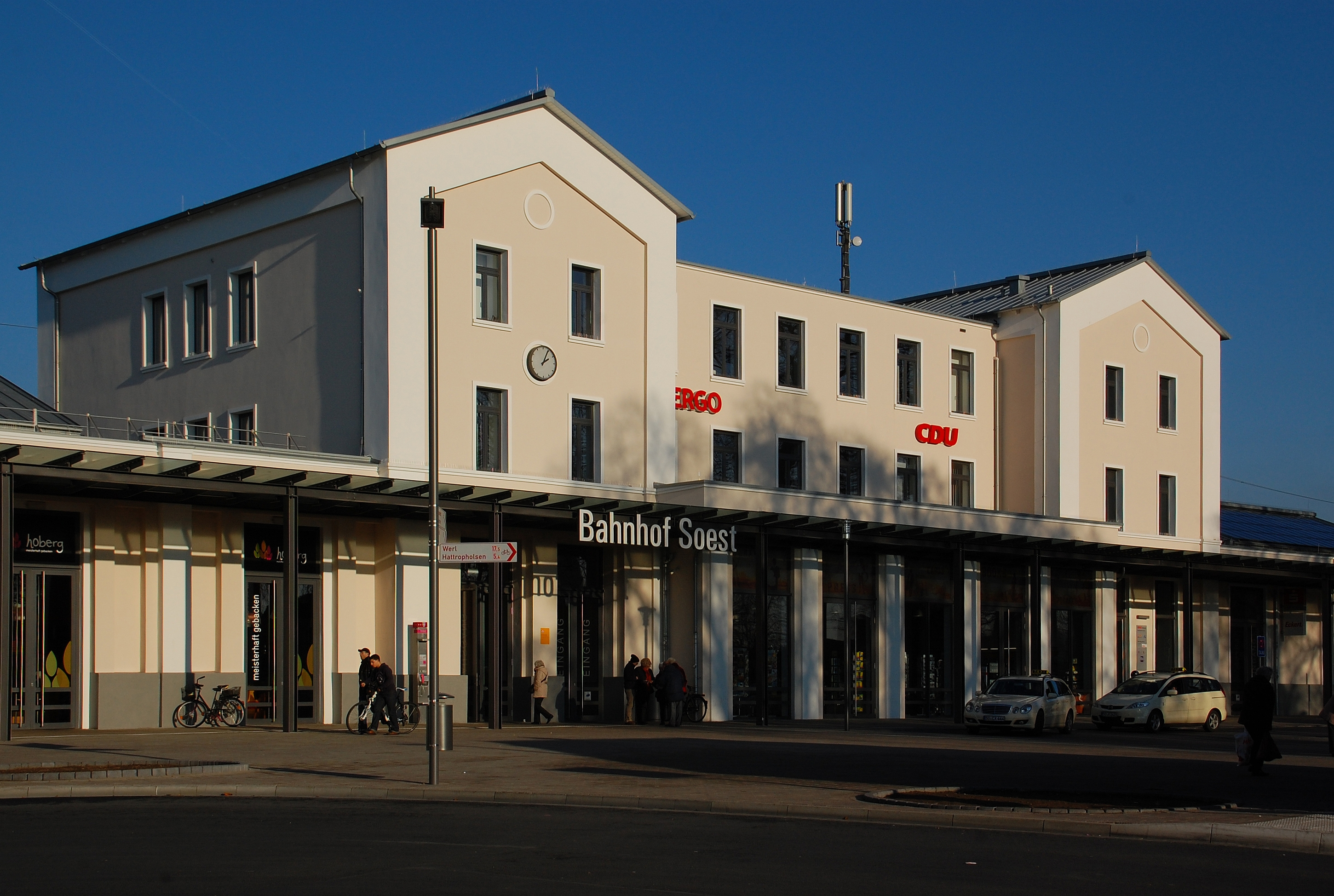

General information
- Location: Bahnhofstr. 2, Soest, NRW; Germany
- Coordinates: 51°34′42″N 8°06′19″E
- Owner: Deutsche Bahn
- Operator: DB Netz; DB Station&Service
- Lines: Hamm–Warburg (KBS 430); Dortmund–Soest (KBS 431); Soest–Brilon (closed)
- Platforms: 3
- Tracks: 4

Construction
- Accessible: Yes

Other information
- Station code: 5876
- DS100 code: ESOT
- IBNR: 8000076
- Category: 3
- Fare zone: Westfalentarif: 49231
- Website: www.bahnhof.de

History
- Opened: 4 October 1850

Services
Preceding station	DB Fernverkehr	Following station
Hamm towards Köln Hbf	IC 51	Lippstadt towards Gera Hbf
Preceding station	National Express Germany	Following station
Unna towards Düsseldorf Hbf	RE 11 (Rhein-Hellweg-Express)	Lippstadt towards Kassel-Wilhelmshöhe
Preceding station		Following station
Westönnen towards Dortmund Hbf	RB 59	Terminus
Borgeln towards Münster Hbf	RB 89	Bad Sassendorf towards Warburg
Location

Soest station (German: Bahnhof Soest) is a passenger station in the city of Soest in the German state of North Rhine-Westphalia. It is on the Hamm–Warburg and the Dortmund–Soest lines. It was also served by passenger trains on the Möhne Valley Railway (Möhnetalbahn) from 1899 to 1960.

== Train services ==
It is served by one InterCity line 51 daily. In regional traffic, it is served by the Rhein-Hellweg-Express on the Düsseldorf–Soest route every two hours. The Rhein-Hellweg-Express is operated by DB Regio NRW. It is served by the Ems-Börde-Bahn stopping service every 30 minutes, operating on the Hamm–Paderborn route and the Hellweg-Bahn stopping service every 30 minutes, operating on the Dortmund–Soest route. The Hellweg-Bahn and the Ems-Börde-Bahn are operated by Eurobahn (Keolis).

In the 2026 timetable, the following regional services stop at the station:

- Regional services as of 2023:

Line	Route	Frequency
IC 51	Düsseldorf – Hamm – Soest – Paderborn – Kassel-Wilhelmshöhe – Erfurt – Gera	Once daily
RE 11	Düsseldorf – Duisburg – Essen – Bochum – Dortmund – Hamm – Soest – Paderborn – Kassel	60 mins
RB 59	Dortmund – Unna – Soest	60 mins
RB 89	Münster – Hamm – Soest – Paderborn – Warburg	60 mins

== Station ==
The Soest station was extensively renovated and refurbished up to 2010 to meet its role as both a regional station as well as a (touristic) gateway to the city. In addition to the renovation of the building and its environment, about five hectares of industrial land has been created. The building of a new underpass gives direct access to the north side of the town. In addition, the level of platform 1 was raised. In addition, the station has new retail, sanitary facilities and automatic teller machines on the ground floor with office space on the upper floors.

== See also ==
- Rail transport in Germany
- Railway stations in Germany
