= Rhein-Hellweg-Express =

Regional-Express service in North Rhine-Westphalia, Germany

RE 11 Rhein-Hellweg-Express
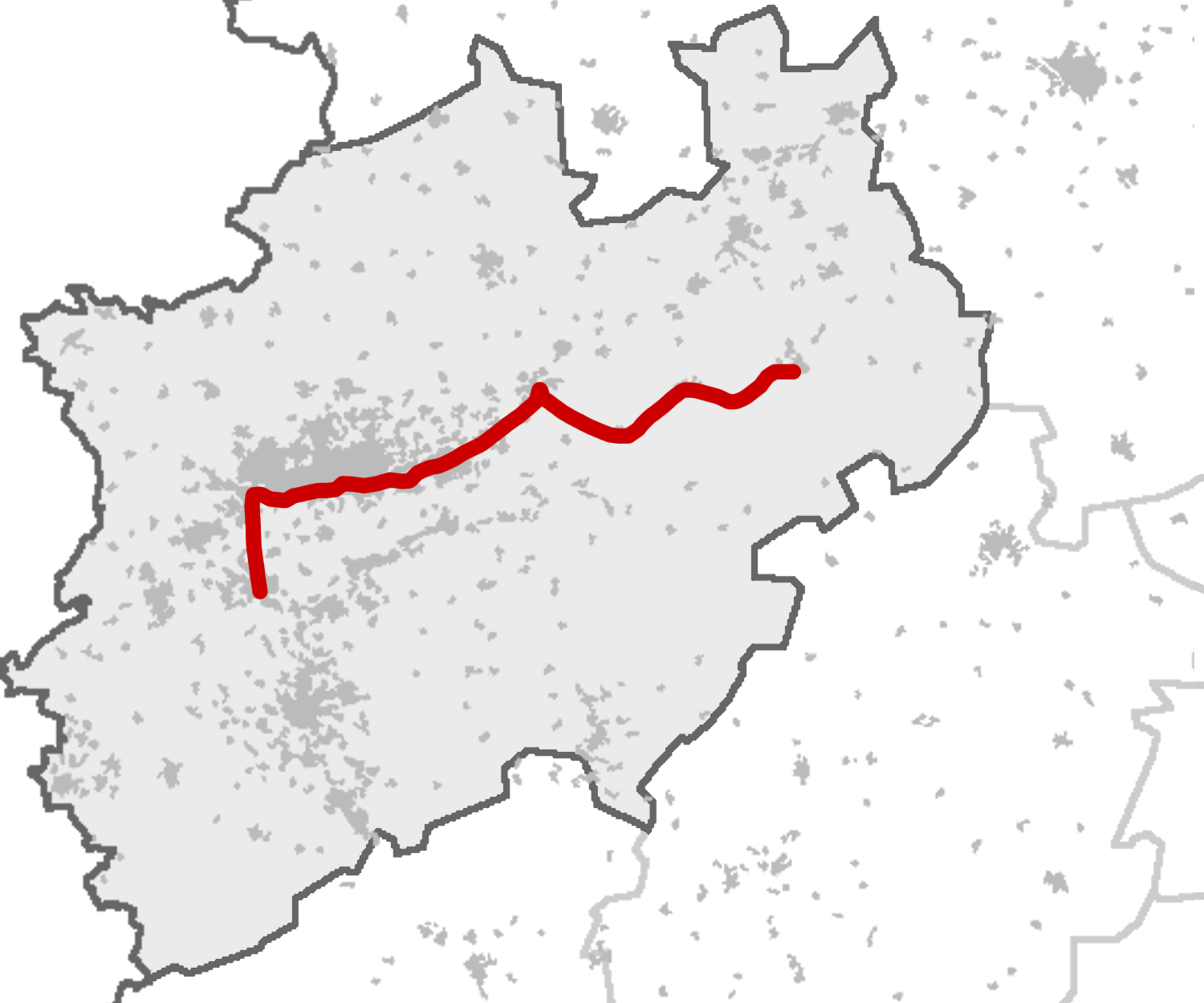

Overview
- Locale: North Rhine-Westphalia, Germany
- Current operator: National Express Germany

Route
- Distance travelled: 293 km (182 mi)

Technical
- Timetable number: 415, 430

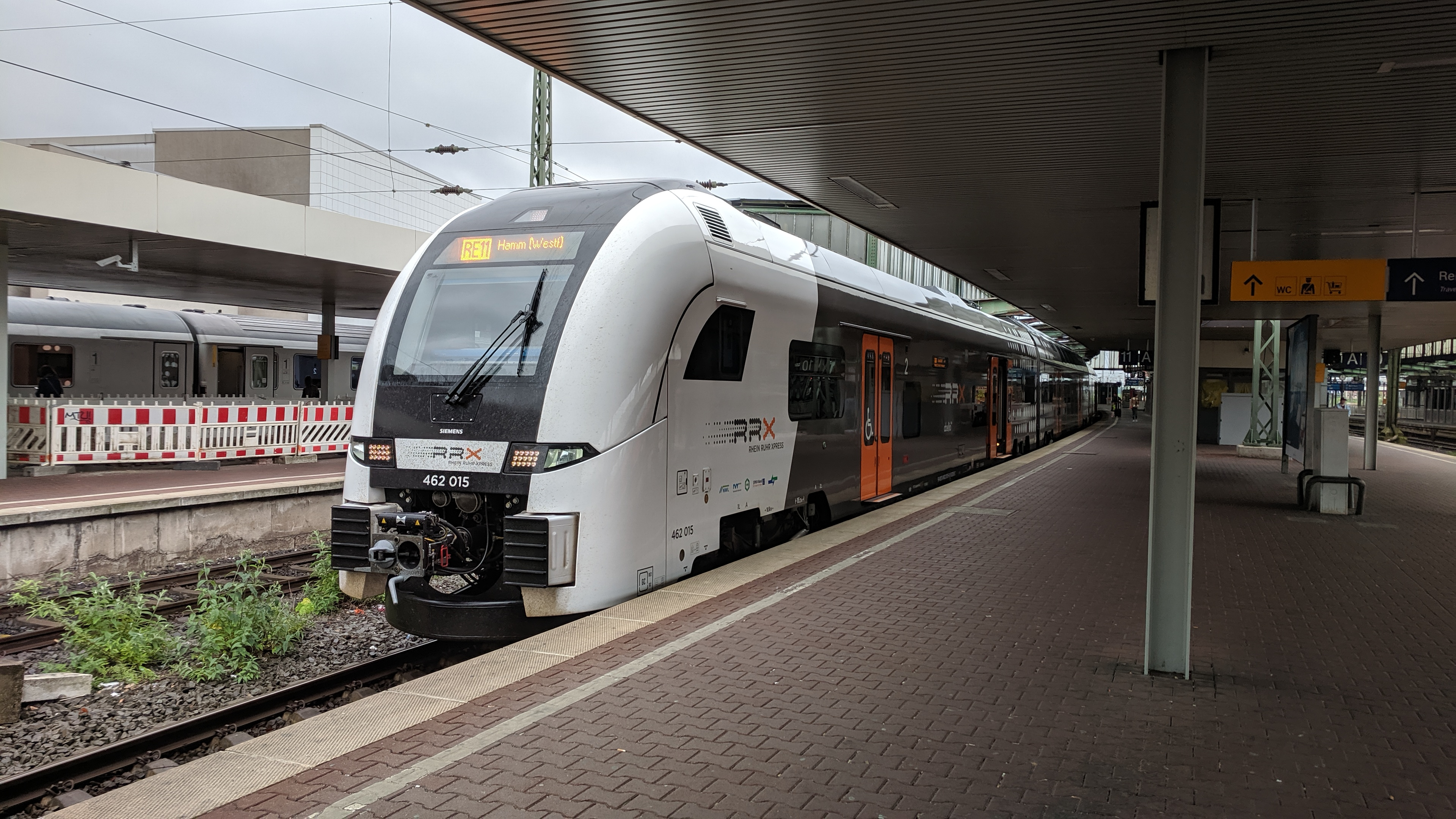
Rhine-Ruhr Express (RE11) train in Duisburg Hauptbahnhof

The Rhein-Hellweg-Express (RE 11) is a Regional-Express service in the German state of North Rhine-Westphalia (NRW), running from Kassel via Dortmund, Bochum, Essen, Duisburg and Düsseldorf Airport to Düsseldorf Hbf. It is named after the Rhine and the Westphalian Hellweg. The line is part of the Rhine-Ruhr Express (RRX) network and is operated by National Express.

== History ==
In 1988 the first regular interval regional rapid train service was established from Dortmund via Essen, Duisburg and Düsseldorf to Cologne. This operated hourly on the Cologne–Duisburg and Dortmund–Duisburg lines, which even then were the most important railway lines for passenger traffic in North Rhine-Westphalia.

With the introduction of high-speed regional services in the early 1990s, this line was named the NRW-Express (originally numbered RSB 1; from 1995 it was redesignated as Stadt-Express line SE 1) and ran from Bielefeld via Hamm, Dortmund, Essen, Duisburg, Düsseldorf and Cologne to Aachen. With the extension of the service on the Hamm–Bielefeld and Cologne–Aachen lines, the service soon had insufficient capacity. Therefore, in May 1998 with the NRW-wide implementation of regional express lines, the NRW-Express (now RE 1) was supplemented by the Westfalen-Express (RE 6) from Bielefeld via Hamm, Dortmund, Essen and Duisburg to Düsseldorf so that on the northern section there were two Regional-Expresses per hour.

After the timetable change in December 2002, services on the central Ruhr axis between Hamm and Düsseldorf increased to five Regional-Express services in each two hour period. The NRW-Express was now shortened to run on the Hamm–Aachen route, the Westfalen-Express (RE 6) was established between Düsseldorf and Minden. The new Rhein-Hellweg-Express (RE 11) was introduced at two hourly intervals, running from Düsseldorf to Hamm and continuing on the line to Paderborn.

When the timetable change in December 2010 there was an exchange of sections between the NRW-Express, the Rhein-Hellweg Express and Rhein-Haard-Express (RE 2):

- The section of the Rhein-Hellweg-Express from Hamm via Soest and Lippstadt to Paderborn was taken over by the NRW-Express; this section continued to be operated only every two hours.
- The section of the Rhein-Hellweg Express between Duisburg and Düsseldorf (now operated hourly) was taken over by the Rhein-Haard-Express. In return, the Rhein-Hellweg Express ran (now also hourly) on the section between Duisburg and Mönchengladbach. The Duisburg–Mönchengladbach line was for the first time connected directly to the eastern Ruhr region by Regional-Express services.

Overall, there were further bottlenecks due to the timetable change. In the central Ruhr area between Hamm and Duisburg, three regional express lines (RE 1, RE 6 and RE 11) were now running at approximately 20-minute intervals. The Hamm–Dortmund section was reinforced by RE 3, the Bochum–Essen section by RE 16 and the Essen–Duisburg section by RE 2.

In the course of the development of the Rhein Ruhr Express (RRX, an upgraded Regional-Express system) network, the Rhein-Hellweg-Express returned to its original route between Düsseldorf and Paderborn and was extended to Kassel-Wilhelmshöhe at the timetable change on 11 December 2016. The section between Hamm and Kassel, however was only operated generally at two-hour intervals and some trains even in the afternoon peak terminated in Paderborn. Due to some remaining IC/ICE services on the line, there were unsatisfactory gaps in the regional services of up to four hours in both directions, especially at lunch time. Departure times also differed significantly, so the timetable was difficult for customers to remember since there are no regular services.

In the evenings, the RE 11 service from Düsseldorf ended in Dortmund. At the other end, some services only ran from Kassel to Hamm, so passengers were forced to change trains regularly to reach the Ruhr area or Düsseldorf.

Due to longer scheduled stays in Duisburg and Dortmund, the travel time of regional services between Paderborn and Düsseldorf increased by up to ten minutes compared to the previous operation by RE 1. The use of the class 425 sets significantly reduced the capacity of seating and standing places. The number of daily circuits serving the entire route was reduced from eight to seven. The section of Eurobahn's daily Dortmund-Kassel-Sprinter service from Hamm was integrated in RE 11.

The section of the RE 11 from Duisburg via Krefeld to Mönchengladbach that is no longer served by the RE 11 was replaced by the RE 42 (Niers-Haard-Express), which was upgraded from the RB 42 and extended from Münster via Essen, Mülheim, Duisburg and Krefeld to Mönchengladbach.

From the timetable change in December 2018 until 16 January 2022, Abellio Rail NRW operated the line. It was transferred from DB Regio to Abellio as part of the Rhine-Ruhr Express. Due to Abellio's insolvency, Swiss Centralbahn and TRI Train Rental took over operations from 17 January to 27 February 2022.

National Express has been operating the route since 28 February 2022.

Due to work at Dortmund Hauptbahnhof as well as on the line between Soest and Hamm, all trains were diverted via Unna and Dortmund-Hörde from November 2022 until April 2023. The Kamen, Kamen-Methler and Dortmund Hauptbahnhof were not served during this period, with the exception of a few trips at the end of the day; Hamm was only served by a few trains terminating there. Instead of Hamm, the trains were split and combined in Unna. The diversion was initially scheduled to last until December 2022, but in fact lasted until 14 April 2023.

Due to the increase in passenger numbers following the extension of the line to Kassel, NWL and NVV planned to increase service to an hourly frequency with the timetable change in December 2020. Due to staff recruitment problems, construction work, and the insolvency of the operator Abellio, the implementation had to be postponed several times until the timetable change in December 2023. For this purpose, services on the RB 89 and RE 17 lines between Paderborn and Kassel were replaced. Hourly timetable gaps now exist only for two Intercity train pairs.

In addition, National Express has almost completely cancelled services on the Hamm–Düsseldorf section due to a lack of staff. Passengers arriving from Kassel must change trains in Hamm to continue to Düsseldorf. In May 2024, it was announced that this extensive cancellation would last until 2 August 2024. In July, this was extended to 1 September 2024, and in August again to 6 October 2024. On 24 September, it was extended to 14 December 2024, and on 2 December 2024, it was extended to 15 June 2025.

== Route ==
The Rhein-Hellweg Express runs daily every hour (every two hours between Hamm and Kassel-Wilhelmshöhe) and uses five railway lines:

- The Kassel–Warburg railway (built by the Frederick William Northern Railway of the Electorate of Hesse) throughout, which is also used by other regional and long-distance services,
- The Hamm–Warburg railway (built by the Cologne-Minden-Thuringian Connection Railway Company until its bankruptcy and completed by the Royal Westphalian Railway Company) throughout, which is also used by other regional and long-distance services,
- The Dortmund–Hamm railway (built by the Cologne-Minden Railway Company), which is also used by three other Regional-Express services and long-distance trains,
- the Ruhr line from Dortmund to Duisburg (built by the Bergisch-Märkische Railway Company), using the long-distance tracks, which is also used by regional and long-distance trains,
- The Cologne–Duisburg railway (built by the Cologne-Minden Railway Company) from Duisburg to Düsseldorf. The Rhein-Hellweg-Express uses the so-called local tracks or the S-Bahn tracks, as does the Rhein-Haard-Express (RE 2), the Rhein-Emscher-Express (RE 3), the Rhein-Weser-Express (RE 6), the Rhein-IJssel-Express (RE 19) and, in some sections, the S-Bahn. Only the NRW-Express (RE 1) and the Rhein-Express (RE 5) use the long-distance tracks.

== Operator ==
The line was operated by DB Regio NRW under a special contract with the North Rhine-Westphalian public transport associations. DB Regio NRW had the contract to operate the line until the timetable change on 13 December 2015. The contract included provisions for services every two hours between Hamm and Paderborn; this section became part of the RE 1 at the timetable change in December 2010, committing operations on this line to run permanently with a sixth double-deck coach.

As part of the so-called RRX interim contract, operations from December 2016 until the commissioning of RRX rolling stock were provided by DB Regio. From the timetable change on 9 December 2018, Abellio Rail NRW took over operations on the line. This subsidiary of Nederlandse Spoorwegen won the contract for the operation of the NRW-Express as Lot 1 of the Rhein-Ruhr-Express.

Due to the insolvency of Abellio Rail NRW and the resulting early termination of the transport contract, National Express Germany replaced Abellio in 2022. Between 17 January 2022 and 27 February 2022, the transport services were briefly provided by Centralbahn and TRI Train Rental.

Following a new tender, National Express was awarded the contract for operation until December 2033.

== Rolling stock ==
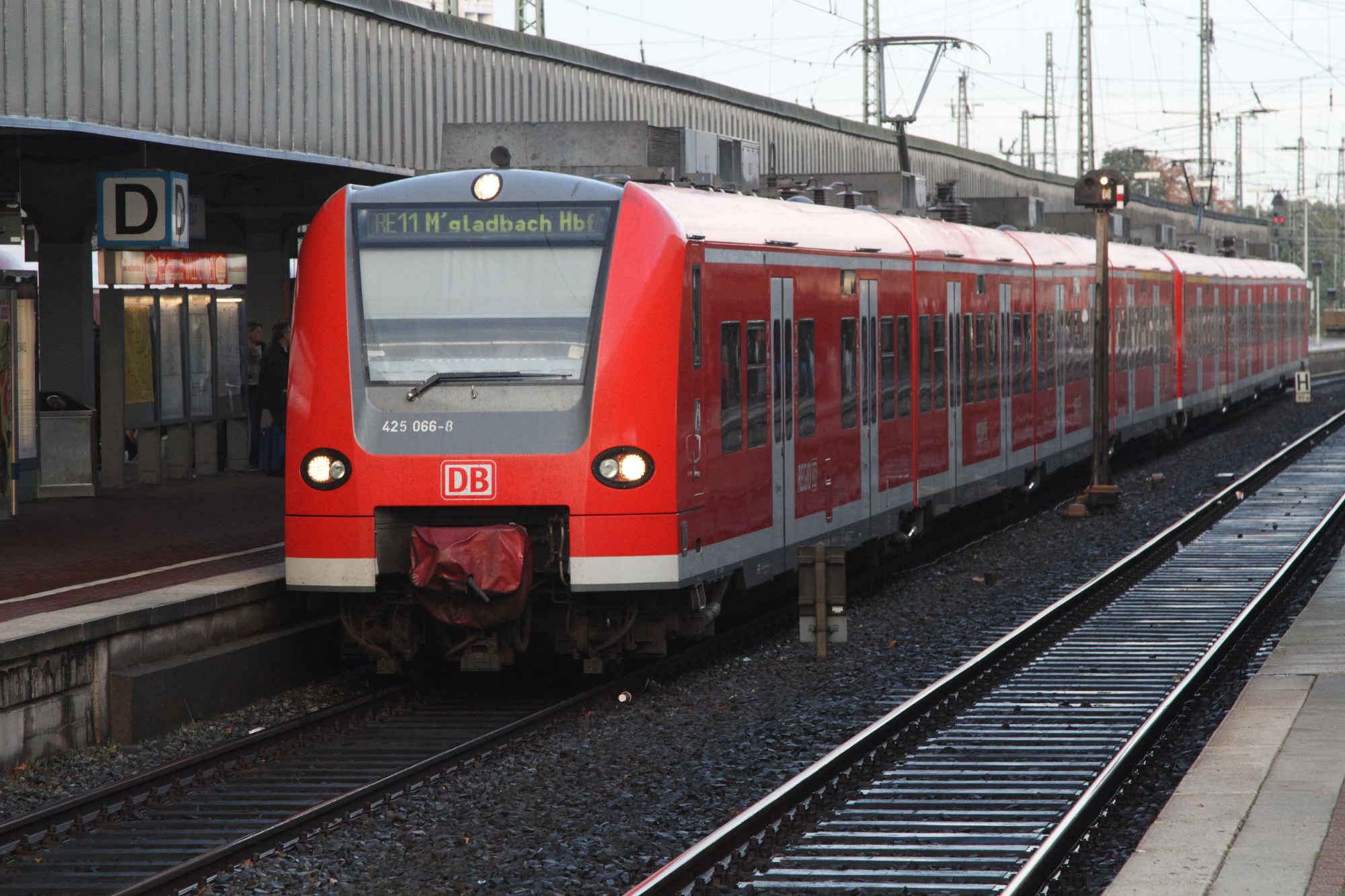
Rhein-Hellweg-Express in Dortmund Hbf, Baureihe 425, 2013

Before the introduction of clock-face scheduling, the supplementary trains between Bielefeld and Duisburg or Düsseldorf were usually made up of four to five Silberling coaches, pulled by electric locomotives of classes class 110, 141 or 143.

While the RE 11 operated on a regular-interval basis between Bielefeld and Düsseldorf, the trains initially generally consisted of class 110 locomotives and four Silberling coaches, later also as push-pull trains with control cars. From around the beginning of the 21st century, it ran with Class 111 locomotives and four double-decker carriages of the classes 751, 756, and 761. With the change to the route between Paderborn and Düsseldorf, n-carriage trains initially ran for a short time, with one class 112 locomotive at each end, shortly afterwards as a five-car Silberling coach push-pull train with class 111 locomotives.

However, it was quickly realized that passenger volumes required higher capacity, so class 112 locomotives (sometimes also class 111) were deployed with four new double-decker carriages. The carriages were air-conditioned and approved for a top speed of 160 km/h (99 mph). The line reached an average speed of 81 km/h (50 mph). The route change in December 2010 to the service between Hamm and Mönchengladbach initially did not change rolling stock deployment.

From 21 February 2011, in addition to the double-decker trains, class 425 electric multiple units were used on the Rhein-Hellweg Express, these had previously been modernised for use on this service. Double-deck trains remained operating on the line until the completion of the conversion to operation with class 425 EMUs. It has been operated with Siemens Desiro HC railcars since 2018.

Since 9 December 2018, Abellio has been operating Siemens Desiro HC RRX railcars in double traction between Düsseldorf and Hamm. Between Hamm and Kassel, services operate in single traction. The weakening and strengthening of train services takes place at Hamm station.

During the interim service due to the Abellio insolvency from 17 January 2022 to 27 February 2022, Centralbahn and TRI Train Rental operated two alternating sets with Class 111 locomotives and two or three double-decker carriages, as well as two sets with ES 64 F (class 182) locomotives and compartment cars between Essen and Kassel. The Centralbahn sets operated as push-pull trains, sometimes with control cars or with two locomotives in sandwich traction, while the TRI Train Rental sets did not have a control car and had to reverse at the terminal stations.

== See also ==
- List of regional rail lines in North Rhine-Westphalia
- List of scheduled railway routes in Germany
