= Altenbeken Viaduct =

Railway viaduct near Altenbeken, Germany

Altenbeken Viaduct Altenbekener Viadukt
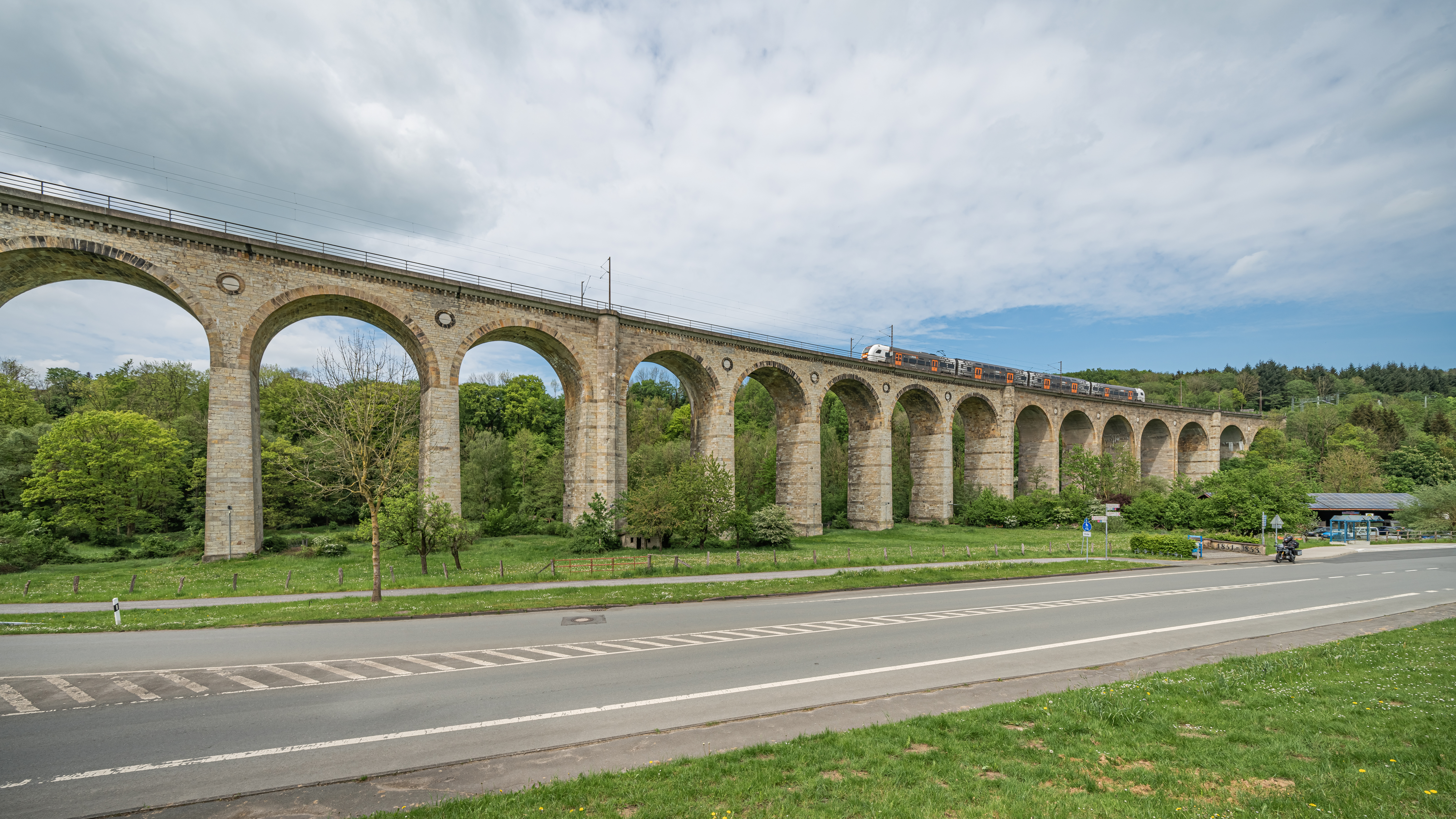
- Altenbeken Viaduct
- Coordinates: 51°45′48″N 08°55′36″E
- Carries: Hamm–Warburg railway
- Crosses: Beketal
- Locale: Altenbeken, Germany
- Official name: Altenbekener Viadukt
- Owner: Deutsche Bahn
- Maintained by: Deutsche Bahn

Characteristics
- Design: Arch bridge, Viaduct
- Material: Limestone
- Total length: 482 m (1,581 ft)
- Height: up to 35 m (115 ft)
- Longest span: 15.69 m (51.5 ft)
- No. of spans: 24

History
- Construction start: 1851
- Construction end: 1853
- Inaugurated: 22 July 1853

The Altenbeken Viaduct (German: Altenbekener Viadukt, also known as Bekeviadukt or Großer Viadukt Altenbeken) is a double track limestone railway viaduct which spans the Beke valley, west of the town of Altenbeken, in North Rhine-Westphalia, Germany. The bridge is 482 m (1,581 ft) long, with 24 arches each of 15 m (49 ft) span, and up to 35 m (115 ft) high.

The viaduct is Europe's longest limestone bridge, and its construction was one of the earliest significant events in the history of rail transport in Germany. As part of the Hamm–Warburg railway between Paderborn and Altenbeken, it is still in use today. It is also the emblem of Altenbeken, and is depicted, in stylized form, on the coat of arms of the municipality.

== History ==
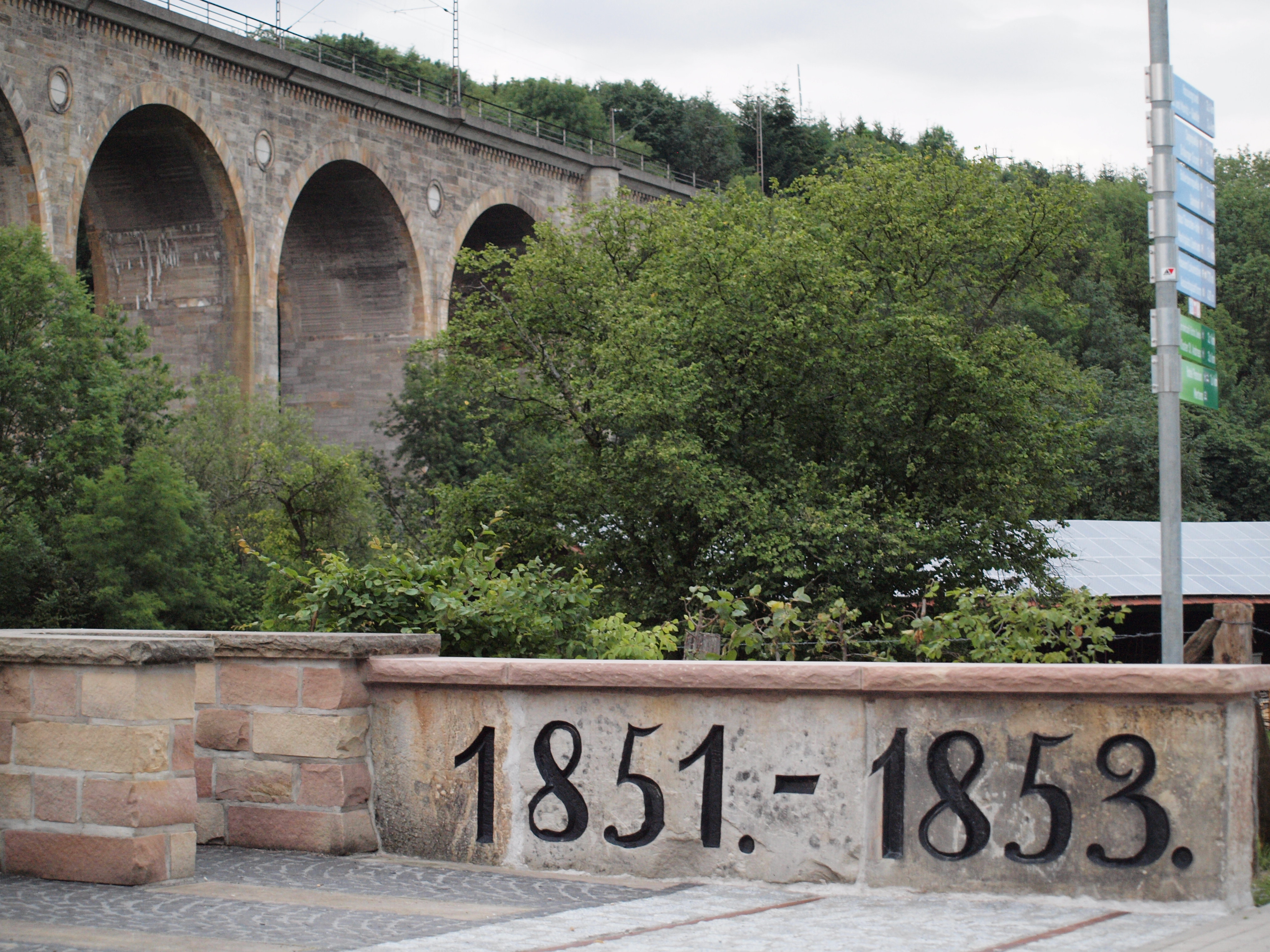
Since July 2009, the Altenbeken Viaduct's keystones have been integrated into a new viewing platform below it.

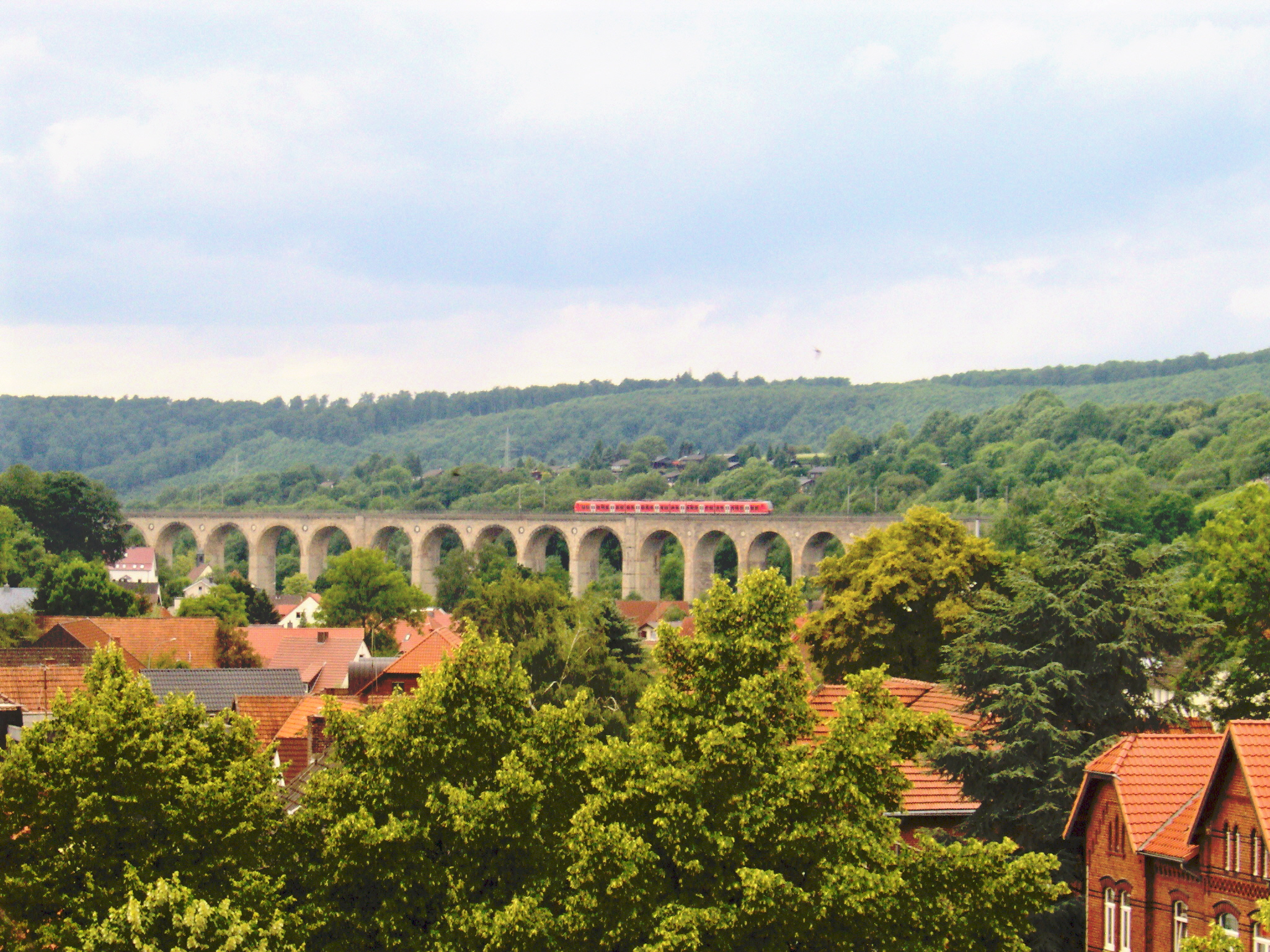
The viaduct spans the Beke valley.

The viaduct was built by the Royal Westphalian Railway Company, and was inaugurated on 21 July 1853 by King Frederick William IV. He was the one who coined the phrase "I had thought I would find a golden bridge, because so many terrible dollars have been spent".

The construction and opening of the viaduct and nearby station, rail yard and tunnel under the Rehberg caused the village of Altenbeken to develop into a railway town, which owes its present size almost exclusively to the railway.

During World War II, the viaduct was a prime target of Allied bomb attacks, in which several columns were destroyed. According to the Americans, the Altenbeken Viaduct, together with the Schildesche Viaduct at Bielefeld, was one of the two most important German railway bridges. The Western Allies were hoping that their destruction would have a decisive effect on the war; they wanted to stop the vital coal supply lines and break the backbone of the German war economy. The stakes were correspondingly high: even the first Allied bombing raid of 26 November 1944 resulted in the greatest air battle of World War II.

As early as September 1943, the second battery of Flakabteilung 943 zur Reichsverteidigung was posted at the viaduct until January 1944. The first air attack on 26 November 1944 by US bombers cut the important railway link. From then onwards, passengers had to climb about 35 m (115 ft) down ladders and then climb up the other side to continue in another train. Goods traffic was diverted to the Detmold-Herford-Bielefeld/Ost route.

Following temporary repairs, the viaduct was again destroyed in February 1945.

By May 1946, the viaduct could once again be traversed, over makeshift trackwork, at 20 km/h (12 mph). Only on 2 October 1950 – almost six years after the first destructive attack – could the viaduct be put back into operation in its old form. The reconstruction of the viaduct took into account the historical shape of the bridge, such that since 1950 it has resembled its old form once again. However, the keystones of the viaduct could not be reinstated. In July 2009, after being displayed for many years as a monument in Adenauerstraße, Altenbeken, they were integrated into the viaduct's newly constructed viewing platform.

== Viaduktfest ==
Between 11 and 21 July 2003, under the name "Vivat Viaduct", Altenbeken celebrated the 150th anniversary of the viaduct. About 40,000 visitors came to Altenbeken.

As the festival was so successful, it was decided to organise it again every two years as a "town and station festival". Thus, in 2005, 2007, 2009 and 2011, many people came to the event.

The Viaduktfest also includes a viaduct walk through the town and a plastic duck race on the Beke river. Celebrities such as Urban Priol, Hennes Bender, Götz Alsmann, Ingo Oschmann or Guildo Horn have complemented the Viaduktfeste with cultural events.

The festival always takes place in early July of odd numbered years.

== See also ==
- History of rail transport in Germany
- Rail transport in Germany
