= Paderborn Hauptbahnhof =

Railway station in Paderborn, Germany

Paderborn Hbf
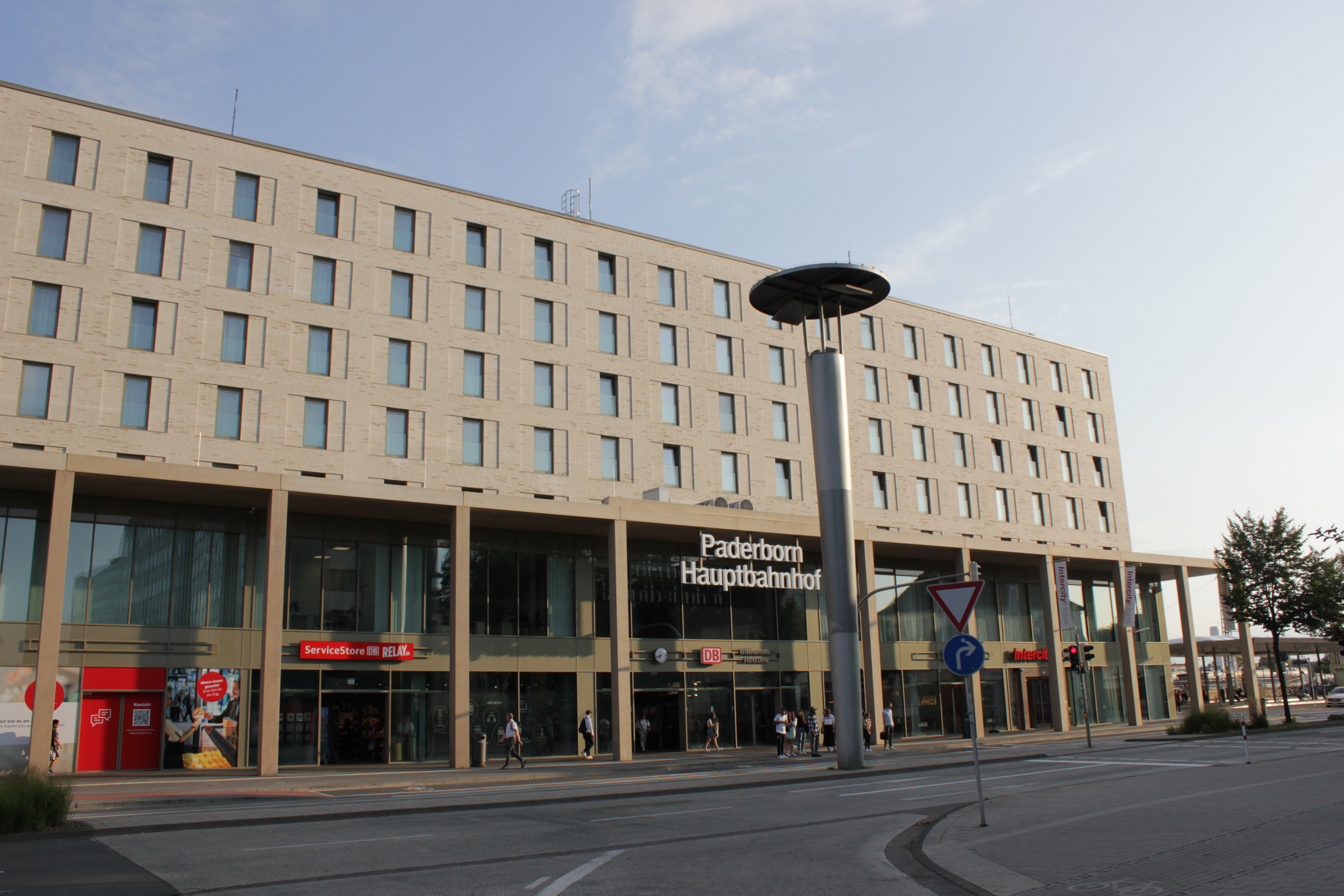
- Paderborn main station, station building, August 2024

General information
- Location: Bahnhofstr. 29, Paderborn, NRW; Germany
- Coordinates: 51°42′47″N 8°44′26″E
- Lines: Hamm–Warburg (KBS 430); Senne Railway (KBS 403)
- Platforms: 5

Construction
- Accessible: Yes

Other information
- Station code: 4846
- DS100 code: EPD
- IBNR: 8000297
- Category: 2
- Fare zone: Westfalentarif: 77701
- Website: www.bahnhof.de

History
- Opened: 4 October 1850; 176 years ago

Services
Preceding station	DB Fernverkehr	Following station
Lippstadt towards Köln Hbf	IC 51	Altenbeken towards Gera Hbf
Preceding station	National Express Germany	Following station
Lippstadt towards Düsseldorf Hbf	RE 11 (Rhein-Hellweg-Express)	Altenbeken towards Kassel-Wilhelmshöhe
Preceding station		Following station
Terminus	RB 72	Altenbeken towards Herford
Scharmede towards Münster Hbf	RB 89	Altenbeken towards Warburg
Preceding station	NordWestBahn	Following station
Paderborn-Kassler Tor towards Bielefeld Hbf	RB 74	Terminus
Terminus	RB 84	Altenbeken towards Kreiensen
Preceding station	Hanover S-Bahn	Following station
Terminus	S 5	Altenbeken towards Flughafen
Location

Paderborn Hauptbahnhof (English: Paderborn Main Station) is the main passenger station in the city of Paderborn in the German state of North Rhine-Westphalia. It is located on the Hamm–Warburg line, part of the Mid-Germany Connection from Cologne or Düsseldorf to Thuringia and Saxony. The Senne Railway branches off to Bielefeld in Paderborn.

== History ==
The railway between Hamm and Paderborn was opened on 1 October 1850 by the Royal Westphalian Railway Company. The line was extended to Warburg in 1853. The Senne Railway was opened in July 1902. The Alme Valley Railway was opened in 1899 towards Büren; it was closed in 1981. Recently there was an attempt to reopen the line to provide a link to Paderborn Lippstadt Airport. The old building of Paderborn Hauptbahnhof was demolished in June 2021 after some delays, and the new building didn't start development until 2022. On 30 January 2024, the new building of Paderborn Hauptbahnhof (Hbf) opened. The newly designed, seven-storey building includes an IntercityHotel, other shops and a DB ServiceStore.

== Operations ==
Several long-distance trains on InterCity line 51 stop at Paderborn. Regional services operate on several Regional-Express and Regionalbahn lines through Paderborn. In addition, Hanover S-Bahn services terminate at the station.

Line	Name	Route	
ICE 41		Düsseldorf – Hamm – Paderborn – Kassel – Würzburg – Nuremberg – Munich	
IC 51	Mitte-Deutschland-Verbindung	Düsseldorf – Hamm – Paderborn – Kassel – Erfurt – Gera	
RE 11	Rhein-Hellweg-Express	Düsseldorf – Düsseldorf Airport – Duisburg – Essen – Dortmund – Hamm (Westf) – Paderborn – Kassel-Wilhelmshöhe	
RB 72	Ostwestfalen-Bahn	Herford – Lage (Lippe) – Detmold – Altenbeken – Paderborn	
RB 74	Senne-Bahn	Bielefeld – Sennestadt – Paderborn	
RB 84; RB 85	Egge-Bahn	Paderborn – Altenbeken – Ottbergen (coupling/uncoupling) –	Holzminden – Kreiensen
RB 84; RB 85	Oberweserbahn	Paderborn – Altenbeken – Ottbergen (coupling/uncoupling) –	Bodenfelde – Göttingen
RB 89	Ems-Börde-Bahn	Münster (Westf) – Hamm (Westf) – Paderborn – Altenbeken – Warburg (Westf)	
S 5	Hanover S-Bahn	Paderborn – Altenbeken – Hamelin – Weetzen – Hanover – Langenhagen – Hanover Airport	

== Location ==
The station is only 500 metres from the city centre. PaderSprinter buses operate from Westerntor and Zentralstation bus stops next to the station, connecting to the centre as well as most other parts of the city. Regional buses run from the bus station to nearby towns (including Delbrück, Hövelhof, Bad Lippspringe, Büren and Warburg).

== Access ==
Only platforms 1 to 3 are accessible by lift. There is a wheelchair lift (operated by rail staff) on the stairs to platforms 4 and 5, which are served by Regionalbahn trains to and from Herford, Bielefeld and Holzminden.

== Transport Associations ==
Paderborn is part of the Paderborn-Höxter Regional Transport Association (Nahverkehrsverbund Paderborn-Höxter).

== See also ==
- Rail transport in Germany
- Railway stations in Germany
