= Royal Westphalian Railway Company =

German rail company

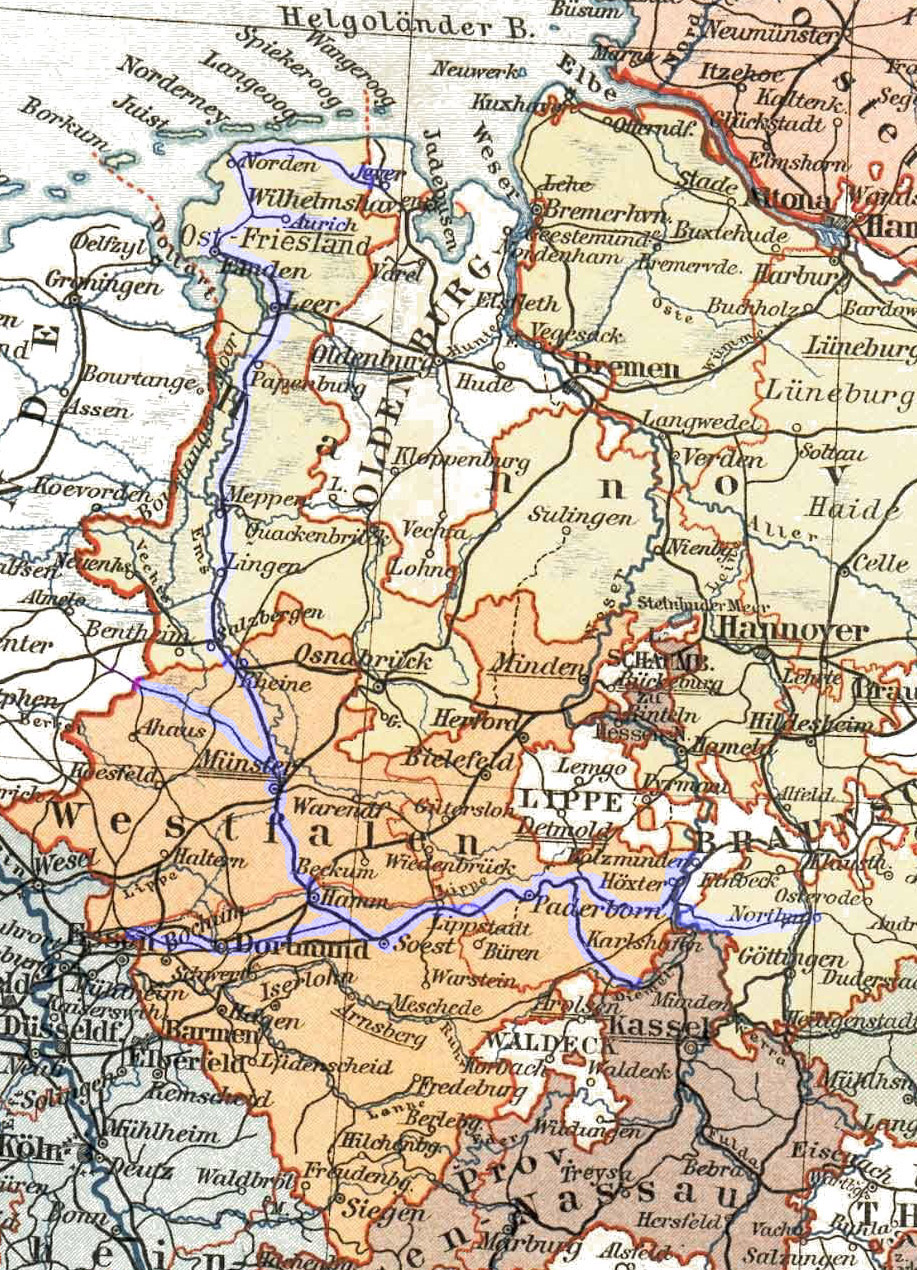
The lines of the Royal Westphalian Railway (blue)

The Royal Westphalian Railway (German: Königlich-Westfälische Eisenbahn, KWE) was a German rail company established in 1848 with funding from the Prussian government, which later became part of the Prussian State Railways. The network eventually extended about 315 km from Rheine via Hamm to Warburg and from Welver (near Hamm) to Oberhausen.

== History ==
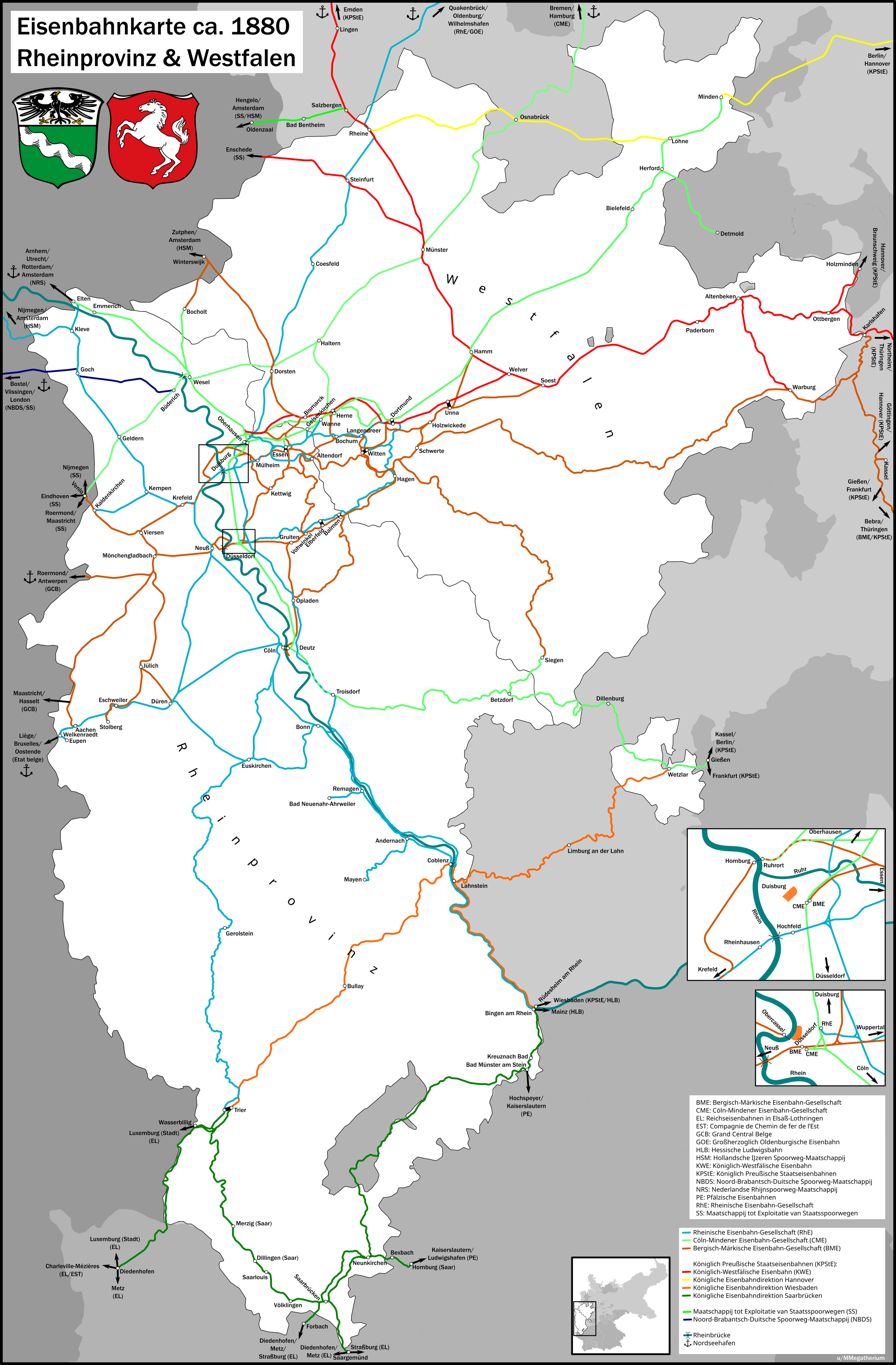
Railway map of the Rhein Province and Westfalen (ca. 1880)

The Royal Westphalian Railway was initially established only to fill the 32 km-long gap between Hamm and Lippstadt, connecting the Münster–Hamm line of the Munster–Hamm Railway Company (Münster-Hammer Eisenbahn-Gesellschaft) opened in 1848 with the line being constructed at the same time by the Cologne-Minden-Thuringian Connection Railway Company (Köln-Minden-Thüringischen-Verbindungs-Eisenbahn-Gesellschaft, KMTVEG). The latter company, however, went bankrupt in 1848 and further construction and the line's later operations were taken over by the Prussian government.

The cause of the bankruptcy of the KMTVEG was the difficulty of building a 600-metre-long tunnel at Willebadessen under the main ridge of the Eggegebirge range. The tunnel, which was never completed, was designed to avoid bridging the valley at Altenbeken. The remains of the site are still visible after more than 150 years; these ruins are known as the Old Railway (Alte Eisenbahn).

The main line of the Royal Westphalian Railway ran from Hamm via Soest, Lippstadt, Paderborn and Altenbeken to Warburg. It was opened on 4 October 1850 to Paderborn and on 21 June 1853 to Warburg. The line was first railway in western Germany to cross mountainous country. The Altenbeken Viaduct was a significant achievement of the early German railways.

After the company took over the Münster–Hamm Railway Company in 1855, it extended the Münster–Hamm line to Rheine in 1856 and to German ports on the North Sea. Together with the Royal Hanoverian State Railways, it built a connection from Rheine to the German ports on the North Sea. This was a very important connection for Prussia because of the high tariffs charged by the Dutch Rhine ports. The Kingdom of Hanover was annexed by Prussia after the Austro-Prussian War of 1866 and two years later this line became part of the Westphalian Railway.

Together with the Rhenish Railway Company, it built and operated a generally straight line, opened in 1876, from Welver station (between Hamm and Soest), via Unna-Königsborn to Dortmund South station (which was destroyed in World War II). The line was extended to the west in 1879 as the Westphalian Emscher Valley Railway (westfälische Emschertalbahn, WfE) via Dorstfeld, Bodelschwingh, Mengede, Herne, Gelsenkirchen, Horst to Osterfeld WfE station. Operations on this line proved to be uneconomic and sections of it were soon closed, following the nationalisation of its main competitors.

== Network ==
Network of the KWE
Opening	Length in km	Course	Notes
1 October 1850	76.1	Hamm–Paderborn	
28 March 1851	4.6	Warburg–Haueda	Leased
22 July 1853	54.5	Paderborn–Warburg	Taken over with the Cologne-Minden-Thuringian Connection Railway Company following a new route.
7 May 1855	34.9	Münster–Hamm	Acquisition of Munster–Hamm Railway Company
27 June 1856	39.0	Münster–Rheine	
1 October 1864	41.4	Altenbeken–Höxter	
10 October 1865	7.4	Höxter–Holzminden	Connecting with the Duchy of Brunswick State Railway's Brunswick Southern Railway to Kreiensen, Jerxheim and Magdeburg
1 January 1868	178.4	Emden–Salzbergen/Rheine	Acquisition of the Emden–Rheine section of the Hanoverian Western Railway of the Royal Hanoverian State Railways
30 September 1875	60.3	Münster–Enschede	
15 May 1876	35.8	Welver–Dortmund KWE	
15 January 1878	64.0	Ottbergen–Northeim	
Summer 1878	80	Emden–Norden–Esens–Wittmund/state border to Oldenburg	Constructed on behalf of the Prussian Ministry of Commerce to create a connection between Emden and Wilhelmshaven for military purposes
Summer 1878	14	Abelitz–Aurich	Constructed on behalf of the Prussian Ministry of Commerce
1 September 1878	12	Dortmund KWE–Mengede	
12 November 1879	~35	Bodelschwingh–Osterfeld KWE	
15 March 1880	4	Osterfeld KWE–Sterkrade KWE	
