= Senne Railway =

Railway line in Germany

Bielefeld–Paderborn railway
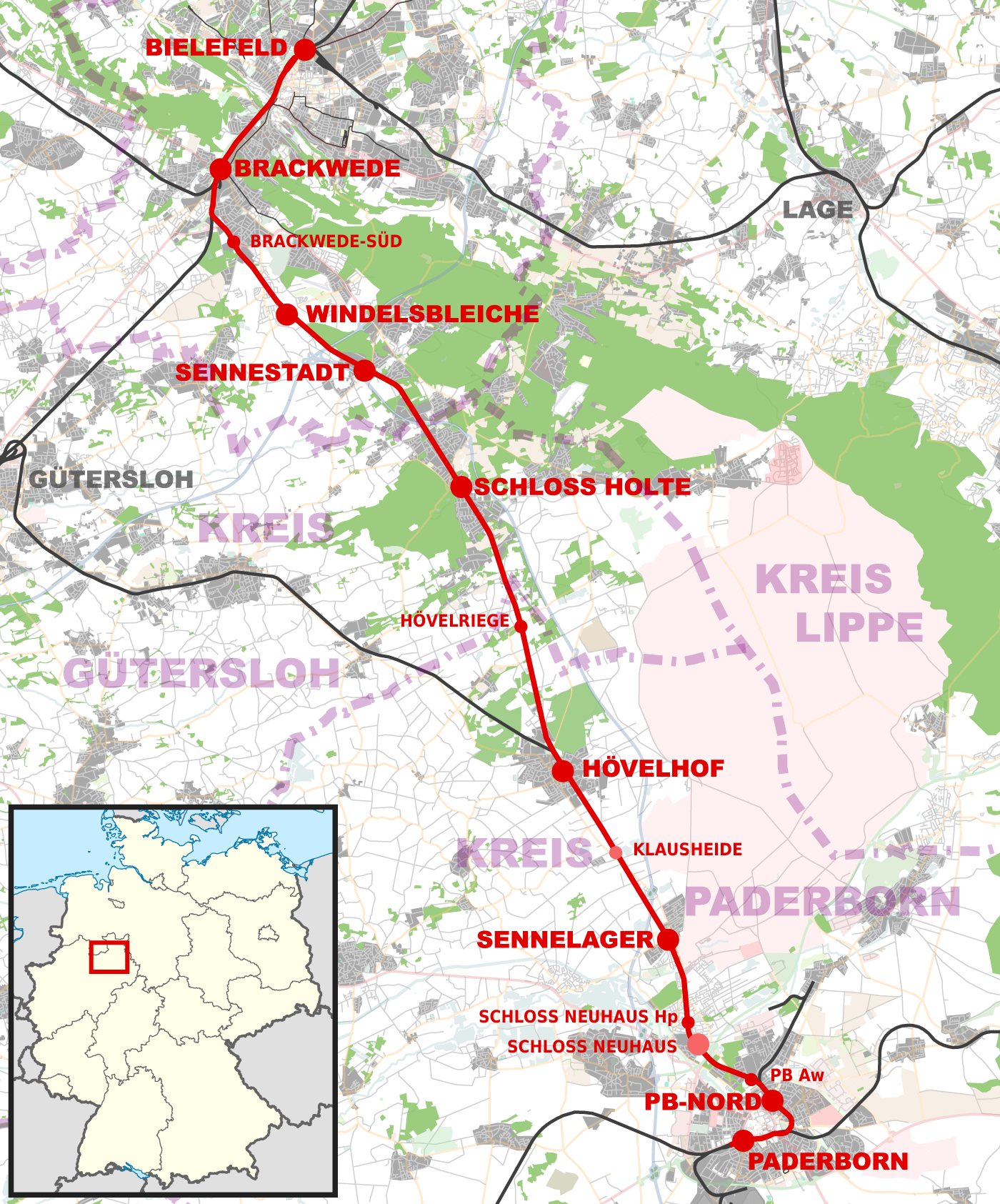

Overview
- Line number: 2960
- Locale: North Rhine-Westphalia, Germany

Service
- Route number: 403

Technical
- Line length: 40 km (25 mi)
- Track gauge: 1,435 mm (4 ft 8 1/2 in) standard gauge

The Senne Railway (German: Senne-Bahn) is a single-track branch line from Brackwede to Paderborn with a through service to Bielefeld in the German state of North Rhine-Westphalia. It received its name from the Senne, a landscape that it crosses in a north-south direction. The Senne-Bahn Regionalbahn service is part of Deutsche Bahn’s Münster-Ostwestfalen (MOW) network of regional services, which has its headquarters in Münster.

The former Westfälische Landes-Eisenbahn‘s Wiedenbrück–Rietberg–Delbrück–Sennelager railway was also called the Senne-Bahn.

== History ==
The northern section of the Senne Railway between Bielefeld and Schloß Holte opened in early December 1901 and the southern part of the line to Paderborn opened on 1 July 1902.

Liemke station was renamed Hövelriege at the request of the municipality of Hövelhof in 1907. Paderborn Kasseler Tor station was opened in Paderborn on the eastern edge of the central area on 1 July 1907. After the economic decline due to the hyperinflation, the railway division in Kassel closed the station on 20 May 1924 due to its alleged unprofitability, but the city of Paderborn successfully lobbied for its reopening, which occurred on 1 July 1926. In 1942, a 600 mm gauge Feldbahn (field railway) was opened from Hovelhof station, to the Stalag 326 prisoner of war camp, which was 5 km away. After the conversion of the camp into a refugee camp, the line remained in operation until 1952.

On 15 May 1949, the legendary Heckeneilzug (“hedgerow express”) ran along the Senne Railway for the first time on the Bremen Hbf–Frankfurt (Main) Hbf route. In the next few years, the pair of trains enjoyed great popularity and extra trains had to be run during the Easter and Christmas holidays. With the closure of passenger services on the Buren–Brilon section of the Alme Valley Railway in 1974, the beginning of the end had come for these trains. First, the trains ran for some time via Warburg and from 1979 they ran only between Bremen and Paderborn with a stop in Hovelhof. In 1983, the operation of all express services on the Senne Railway ended.

On 17 November 1964, the existing municipality of Liemke renamed itself Schloss Holte after its station. This was a consequence of the rapid, especially economic development in the area of the station, while Liemke’s original centre had stagnated since the opening of the line.

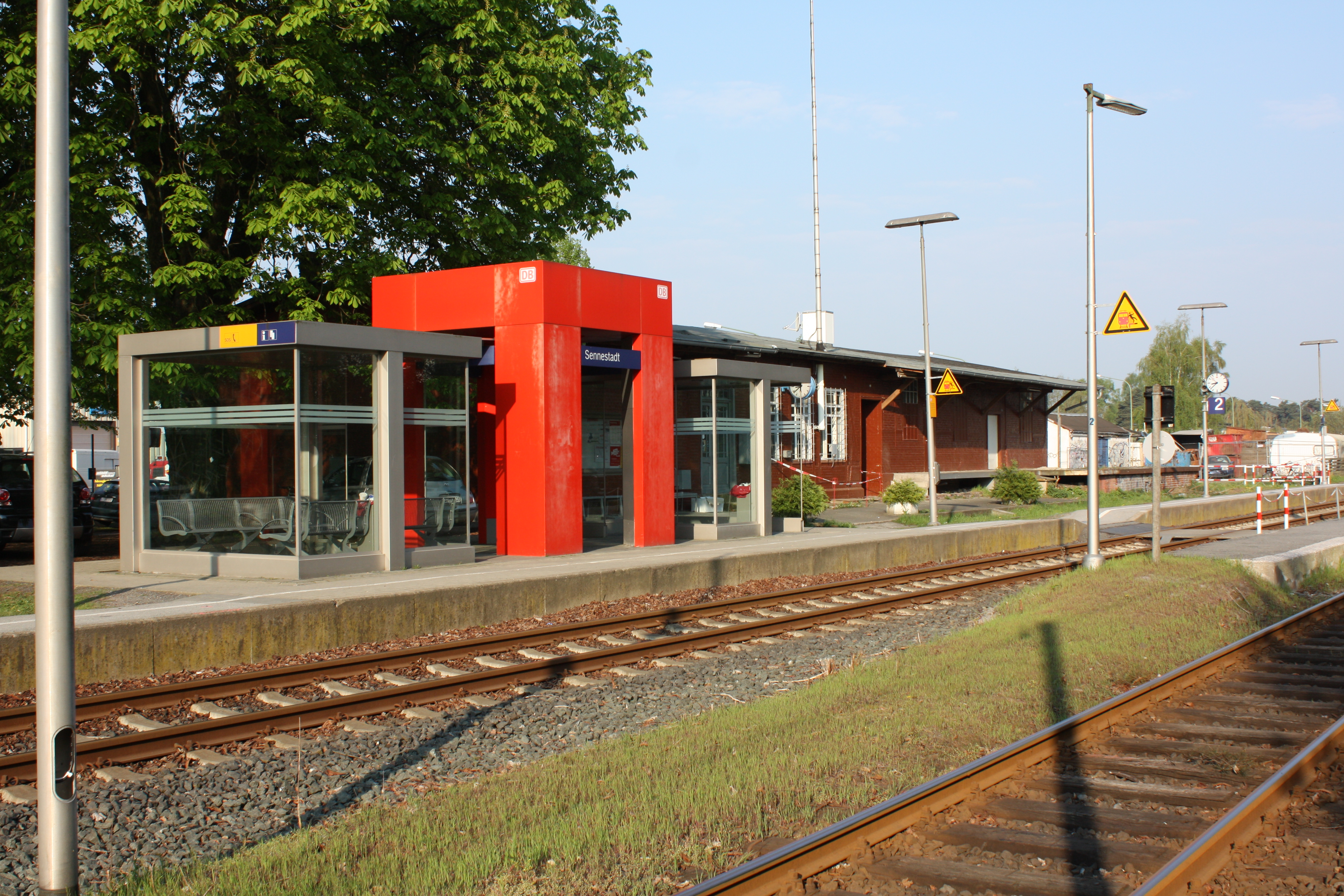
Sennestadt station

The name Windelsbleiche for the station in the former municipality of Senne I was a result of the successful advocacy of Windel, a local textile company. The station in the former municipality of Senne II was called Kracks until 1966 after Johann Krack, the owner of the farm on which the station was built, and is now called Sennestadt ("Senne town").

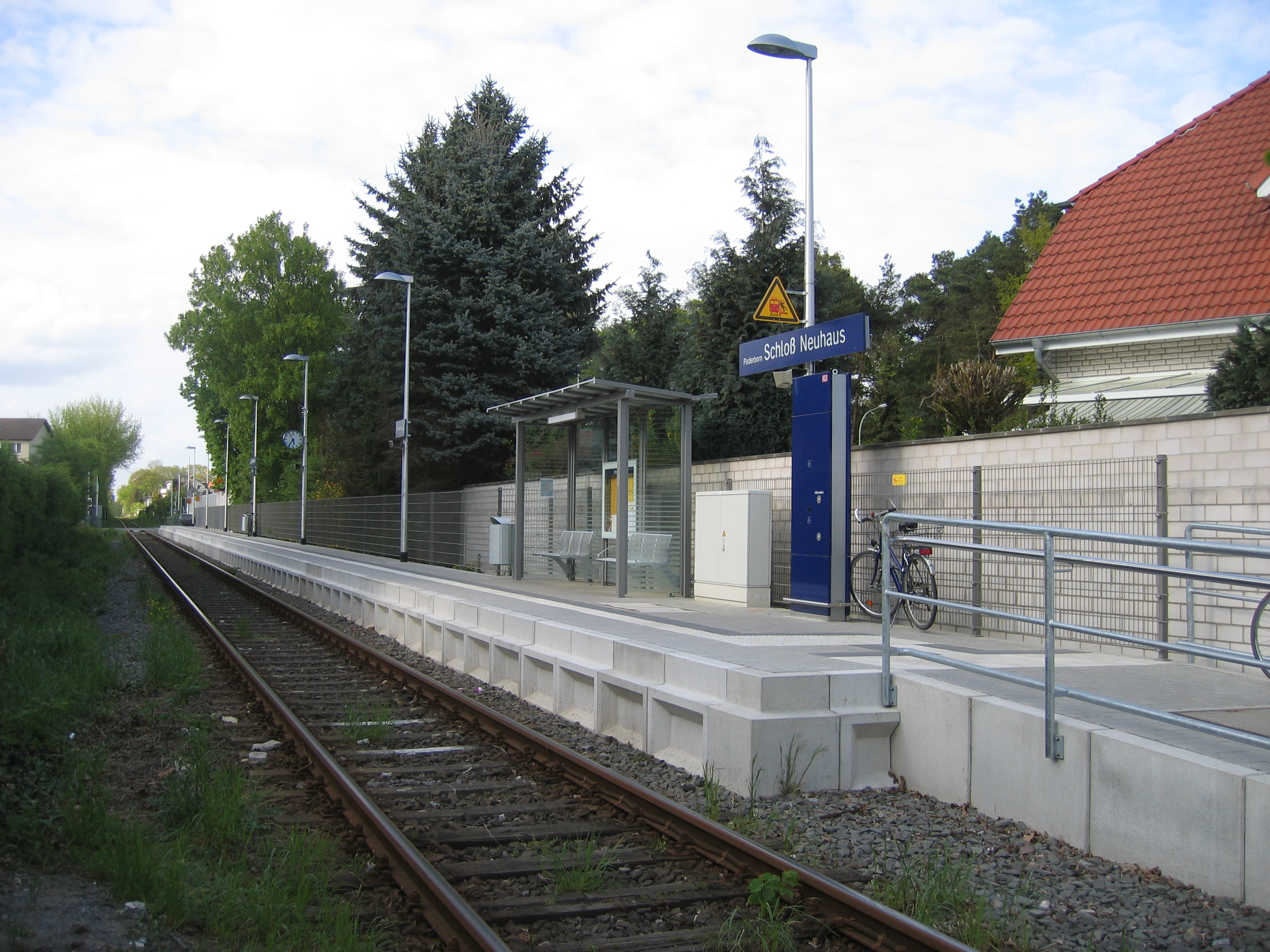
Schloß Neuhaus station

The former Schloss Neuhaus station was reduced in the early 1980s to a siding. This continues to be connected for rail freight to the Benteler works. A new Schloss Neuhaus station was opened on 30 October 2008 between Schatenweg and Hatzfelder Straße with access to Schatenweg; the access from Hatzfelder Straße has not yet been completed due to problems with land acquisition.

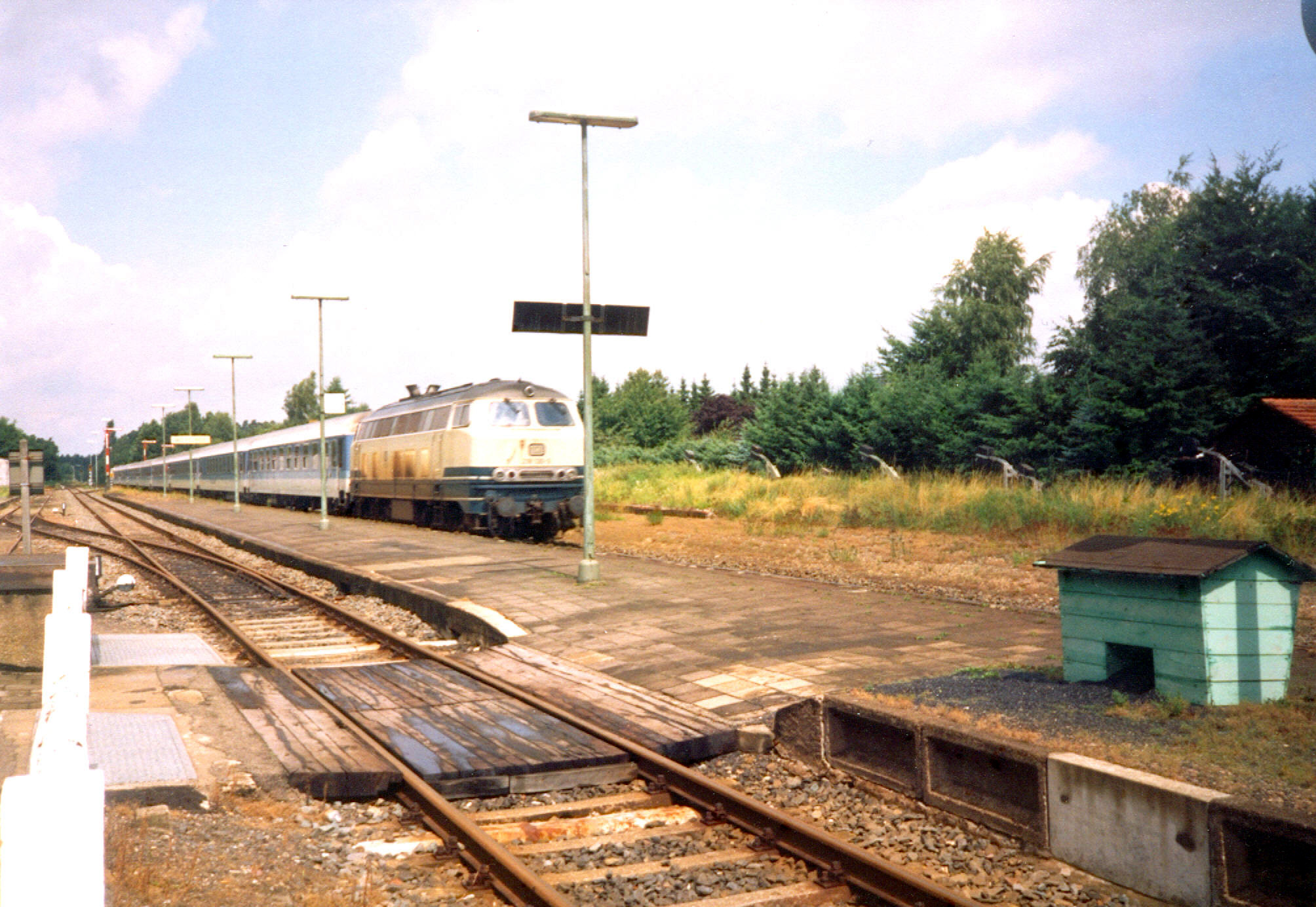
Diverted InterRegio service in Hövelhof, July 1993.

Passenger services have no longer stopped at Brackwede Süd since the timetable change on 11 December 2011. Simultaneously, the closed Bielefeld Senne station, which was rebuilt in September 2011, was restored to operation.

== Reconstruction of the line ==
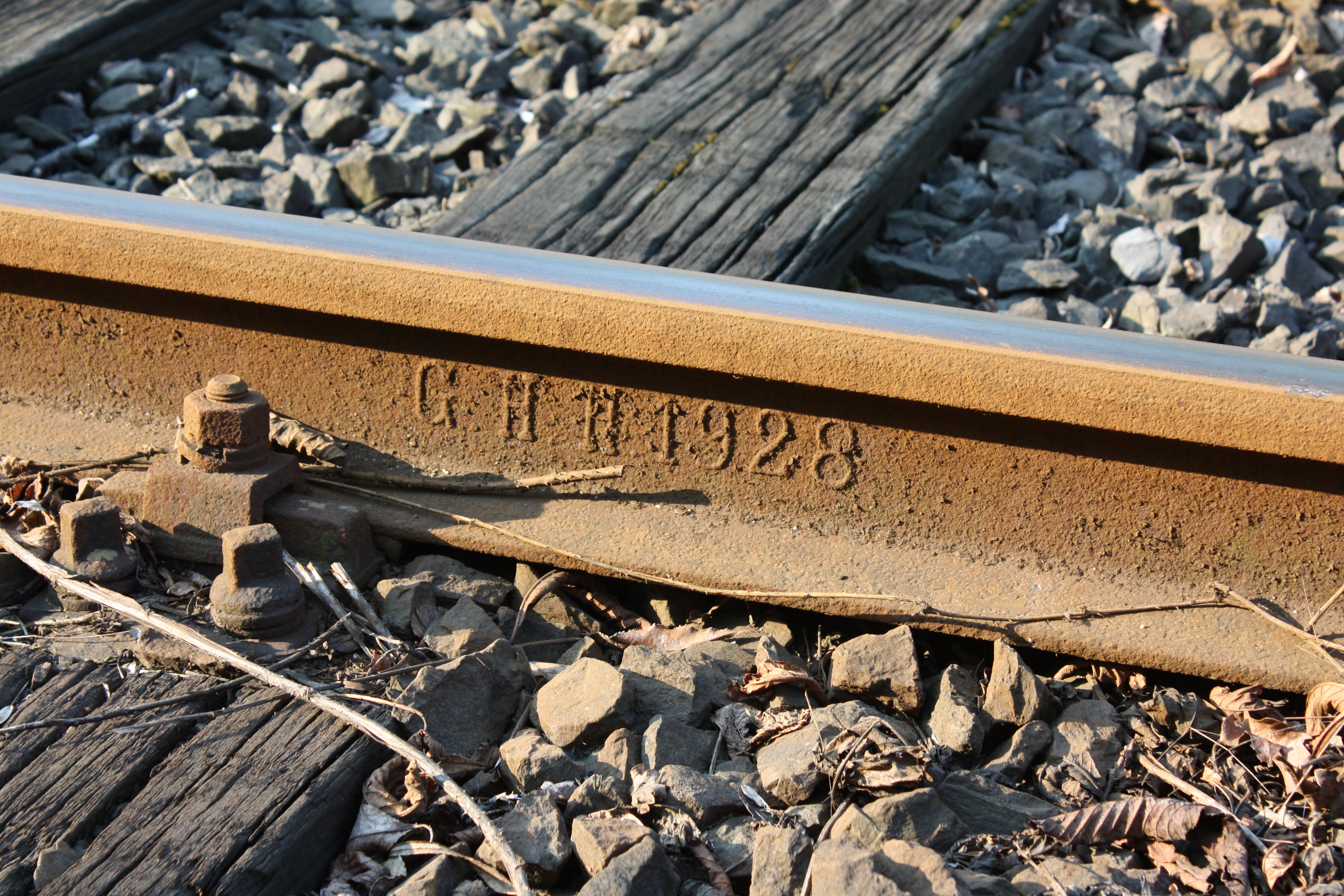
Section of track built in 1928 in Sennestadt station

The upgrade of the Senne Railway is one of the most pressing transport projects in the Detmold region. After fierce debate on the granting of appropriate state funds in February 2006, the regional council of Ostwestfalen-Lippe decided to give the upgrade project the first place of its list of priorities, so that the line is included in the integrated transport plan for the state of North Rhine-Westphalia. The regional council considered an extension of the Senne Railway to Paderborn Lippstadt Airport, partly using the route of a disused section of the Alme Valley Railway, but the idea has been dropped.

In May 2011, the upgrading of the line began at Hövelriege station, where a new platform was built on the opposite side of a level crossing. Train running in each direction now stop after this level crossing, so that the crossing barrier remains closed only for a short time. A new station called Bielefeld-Senne was built between September and the timetable change in December 2011. It replaces the station of Brackwede Süd, but it is planned to reopen this station later or to rebuild it closer to Brackwede as a barrier-free platform. There are currently discussions on locating it near the IKEA furniture store instead.

€34 million was allocated for modernising level crossings and replacing signalling equipment by December 2013. The platforms are to be renewed and brought to a uniform height of 76 centimetres. The journey time between the two regional centres would then be reduced to 54 minutes (13 minutes less than before) and the maximum speed will be raised to 100 km/h. It will be possible to run services at half-hour intervals.

From 14 June 2014, the travel time between Bielefeld and Paderborn will be reduced by 9 and 14 minutes depending on the direction and an hourly service will run on Sundays; a half-hourly service will run the entire route during the peak hour. However, trains will no longer continue from Paderborn via Ottbergen to Holzminden as the RB 84 (Egge-Bahn).

== Current operations ==
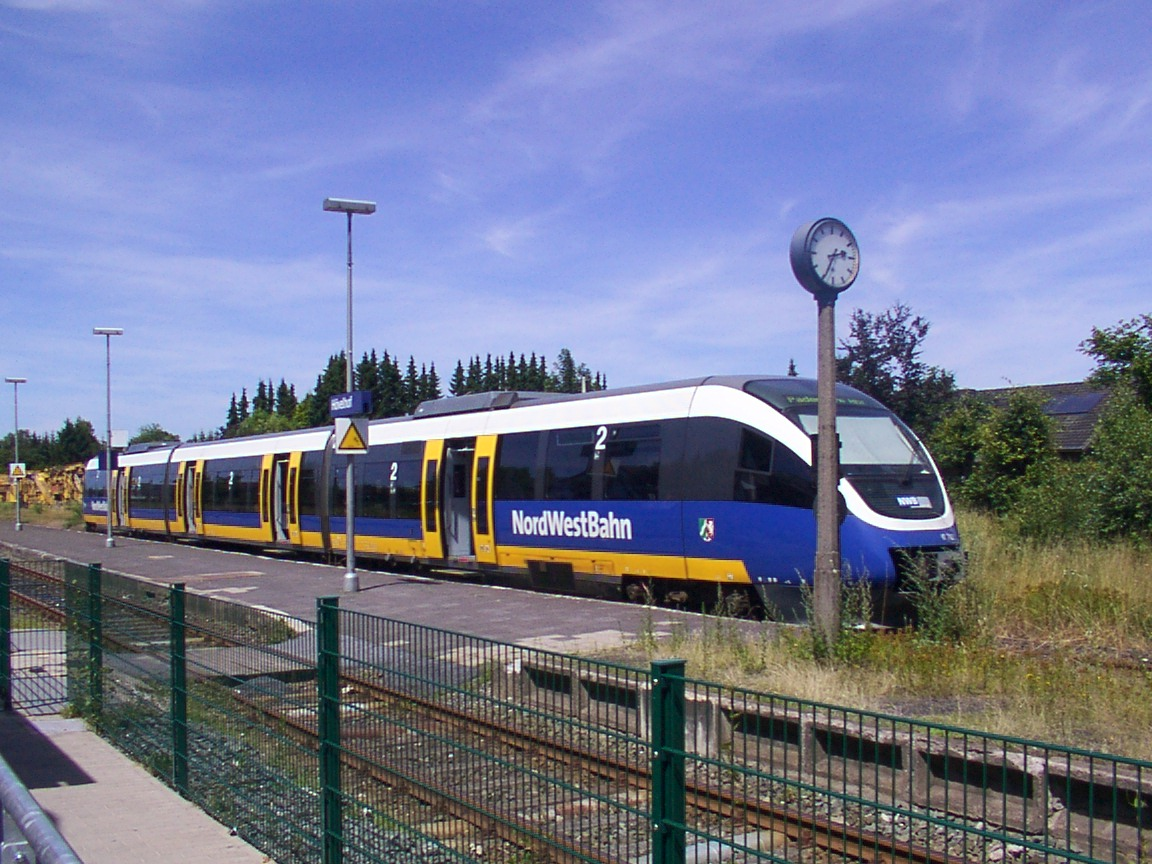
The Senne Railway in Hövelhof station

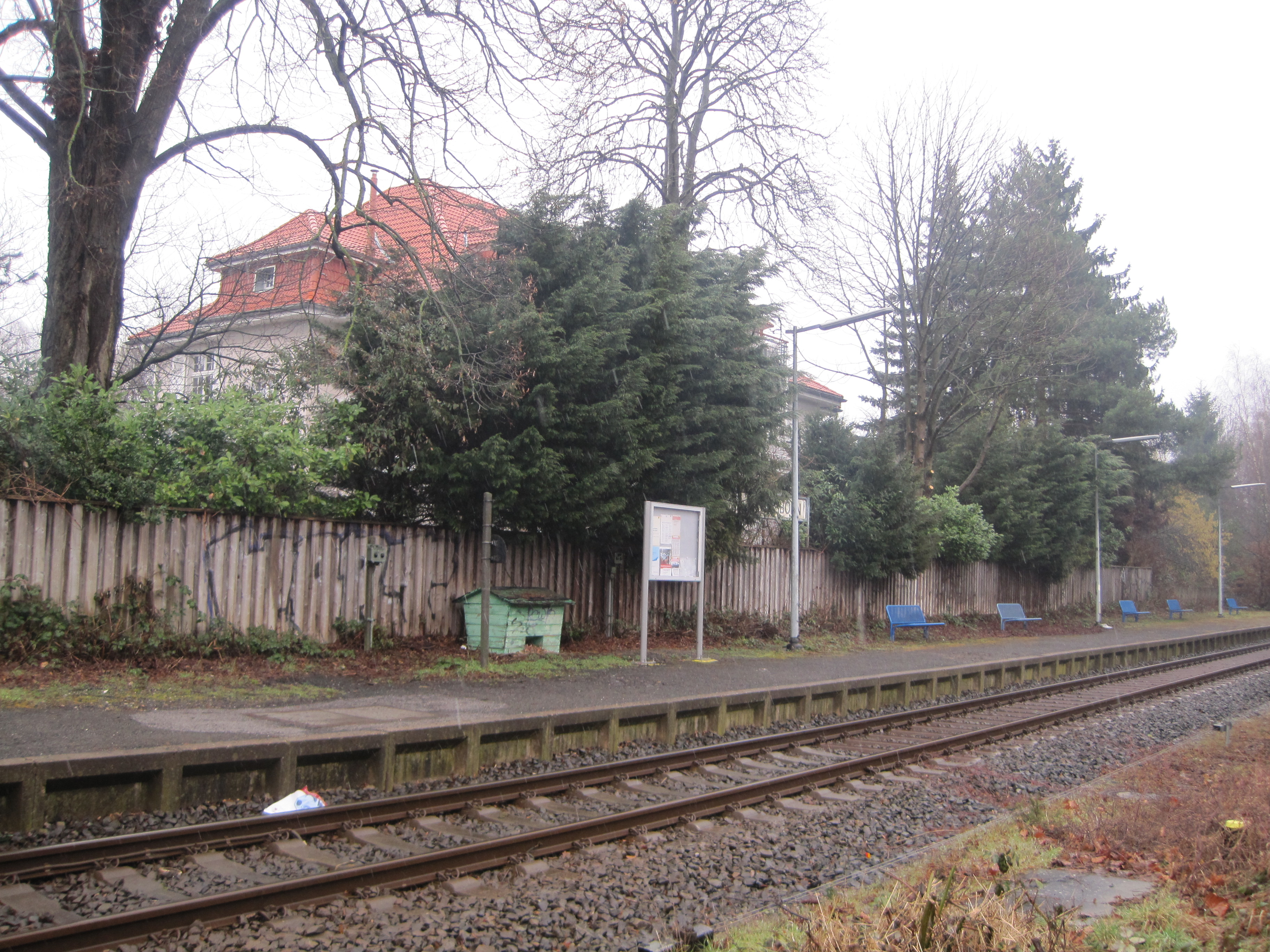
Aw Paderborn halt

Regionalbahn services on the Senne Railway have been operated by NordWestBahn, which is based in Osnabrück, since 15 December 2003. It uses Bombardier Talent railcars with a maximum design speed of 120 km/h. The average cruising speed is 42 km/h due to the maximum line speed of 60 km/h.

The services on the line are operated as RB 74 (Senne-Bahn), hourly from Mondays to Saturdays and every two hours on Sundays. The train crossings usually occur on the symmetry minute in Sennestadt and also in Sennelager at hourly intervals. Because of the need to adhere to the timetable at the symmetry minute, some connections towards Osnabrück and Münster are missed in Brackwede. In Paderborn there is a through connection via the Egge-Bahn to Holzminden. Passengers on this route must therefore not change trains because the railcars only reverse before continuing as the Egge-Bahn service.

In order to make the route more attractive for cycling tourism, the line was branded as the BahnRadRoute Teuto-Senne (Teuto-Senne railway-cycling route) from Osnabrück via Bielefeld to Paderborn. Many passengers travel with bicycles, especially on weekends in the summer. Cyclists have become an important factor for the preservation of the rail link. The carriage of bicycles has, however, been limited due to lack of space since the change of the operator to NordWestBahn and reservations have general been required since 2009 (a booking is now recommended). Individuals with cycles will be carried without prior notice if possible.

A special feature is Aw Paderborn station near Paderborn workshop (Ausbesserungswerk, AW). It is served by only one pair of trains from Monday to Friday (by a train from Paderborn in the morning and by a train to Paderborn in the afternoon). On Friday afternoon, however, an additional train stops there running towards Paderborn.

== Fares ==
The northern section to Schloss Holte is covered by Zweckverband Verkehrsverbund OWL fares. The section from Hövelriege to Paderborn is covered by the Hochstift-Tarif (fares) of the Nahverkehrsverbund (local transport association of) Paderborn-Höxter. For through trips on this route, there is a transition fare and trips can be made throughout North Rhine-Westphalia using NRW-tariff (fares).

== Paderborn Nord–Bad Lippspringe ==
Paderborn Nord–Bad Lippspringe railway

Overview
- Line number: 2962
- Locale: North Rhine-Westphalia, Germany

Service
- Route number: last 223c; 198r(1944)

Technical
- Line length: 7.4 km (4.6 mi)
- Track gauge: 1,435 mm (4 ft 8 1/2 in) standard gauge

A line branches off in Paderborn Nord to Bad Lippspringe, which was opened on 8 October 1906. The station building in Bad Lippspringe was built with extensions of solid construction and a freight shed with three tracks of utilitarian design. Its loading tracks had a 40 m-long (130 ft) ramp allowing loading from the side and the end. Six people were employed in at Lippspringe station for 50 years.

Passenger traffic was only moderate. After 1945, passenger services never again reached the average of about six pairs of trains a day that prevailed between the line's opening and the beginning of the war in 1939. Three pairs of trains remained in 1949 and only a pair of mixed trains was left at the end of passenger traffic on 30 May 1965. A large proportion of passengers had been employees of the Paderborn workshop. They also used passenger trains from the workshop to Paderborn Hauptbahnhof until 1965. Between 1980 and 1987, there were still several special services using museum train between Bad Lippspringe and Paderborn.

The station building in Bad Lippspringe was acquired by the city after the closure of passenger services and demolished in 1973 due to disrepair. The freight shed was initially leased as a warehouse, but after a fire in 1981 it was also demolished.

With the sharp decline in freight traffic from the Benteler siding towards Bad Lippspringe, traffic ended on 30 January 1988. In 1990, the city bought the site of the former station building from the state development corporation and released it for development. The remaining section of the line was officially shut down on 30 April 2005 and sold to the Benteler company. This continues to operate as a private siding.
