= 2011–12 New Jersey Devils season =

National Hockey League season

2011–12 New Jersey Devils
- Eastern Conference champions
- Division: 4th Atlantic
- Conference: 6th Eastern
- 2011–12 record: 48–28–6
- Home record: 24–13–4
- Road record: 24–15–2
- Goals for: 228
- Goals against: 209

Team information
- General manager: Lou Lamoriello
- Coach: Peter DeBoer
- Captain: Zach Parise
- Alternate captains: Patrik Elias; Ilya Kovalchuk
- Arena: Prudential Center
- Average attendance: 15,396 (87.4%); Total: 631,258 (41 games)

Team leaders
- Goals: Ilya Kovalchuk (37)
- Assists: Patrik Elias (52)
- Points: Ilya Kovalchuk (83)
- Penalty minutes: David Clarkson (138)
- Plus/minus: Bryce Salvador (+18)
- Wins: Martin Brodeur (31)
- Goals against average: Johan Hedberg (2.23)

The 2011–12 New Jersey Devils season was the 38th season for the National Hockey League (NHL) franchise that was established on June 11, 1974, and 30th season since the franchise relocated from Colorado prior to the 1982–83 NHL season. The Devils hoped to return to the playoffs after having their long playoff streak snapped the previous year. While finishing fourth in the strong Atlantic Division, they ranked sixth in the Eastern Conference, thus securing a playoff berth, and faced the Southeast Division-winning Florida Panthers in the Conference Quarterfinals where they won in seven games. In the Conference Semifinals, the Devils played against the Philadelphia Flyers and won in five games. In the Conference Finals, they faced their rivals, the New York Rangers, and won in six games advancing to the Stanley Cup Final for the first time since the 2002–03 season. The Devils lost in the 2012 Stanley Cup Final to the Los Angeles Kings in six games.

== Off-season ==
The focus of the Devils during the 2011 off-season was on finding a new coach and player signings. The main focus of the team was resigning Zach Parise and signing fourth-overall 2011 pick Adam Larsson to an entry-level contract, although team CEO and General Manager Lou Lamoriello did find the time to sign goaltender Johan Hedberg, as well as defenseman Andy Greene. Additionally, the team chose to suspend operations of the Trenton Devils, which was a minor league ECHL club that the team had used for player development, citing declining fan interest in the team and a desire to bring the organization more in line with other NHL organizations in terms of minor league affiliations.

The Devils announced the hiring of Peter DeBoer as the new head coach of the team on July 19, 2011.

== Pre-season ==
On June 30, 2011, the New Jersey Devils announced that they would play six games during the pre-season. There were three home games at the Prudential Center against the New York Rangers, New York Islanders and Philadelphia Flyers. They also played two road games, one against the Islanders at Nassau Coliseum and one against the Flyers at Wells Fargo Center. One neutral site game against the Rangers took place at the Times Union Center, located in Albany, New York.

== Regular season ==
The Devils had a very effective penalty kill during the regular season, allowing the fewest shorthanded goals in the League (27) and having the highest penalty-kill percentage (89.58%). The 89.58% penalty kill is the best penalty kill by any team in a season in NHL history. They also scored the most shorthanded goals in the NHL (15) and allowed the most shorthanded goals in the League (13).

- December 17, 2011 – Patrik Eliáš scores goals 347 and 348, surpassing John MacLean as the Devils' leading goalscorer.

== Playoffs ==
The Devils clinched their 20th playoff berth in 22 seasons with a 5–0 win over the Carolina Hurricanes on March 31, 2012. They finished the regular season with 102 points, finishing fourth in the Atlantic Division and sixth in the Eastern Conference. The Devils finished the regular season as the 6 seed in the East with 102 points. Returning injured center Travis Zajac led the team's offense as they then proceeded to knock the Florida Panthers out of the playoffs in 7 games, winning game 6 in overtime with a goal from Zajac and another in double overtime in game 7 from Henrique. They moved on to play their division rivals, the Philadelphia Flyers, in the conference semifinals and were considered heavy underdogs in the series. They faced some early setbacks against the Flyers including a Game 1 overtime loss and the injury of all-star Ilya Kovalchuk. However the Devils rallied in Game 2 without their star forward, winning the game by a score of 4–1. Kovalchuk returned strong for Game 3 and his pass to Ponikarovsky gave the Devils a much needed overtime goal to win Game 3. The streak continued as the Devils would win 4 in a row to eventually defeat the Flyers and advance to the Eastern Conference Finals for the first time since 2003. The Devils would play the New York Rangers in the Conference Finals, a rematch of the 1994 series that resulted in a heartbreaking Game 7 overtime loss during Brodeur's rookie season. The series was highly publicized by the New York media and was a tough back-and-forth battle for the first four games, leaving the series split 2-2. The Devils' fourth line, which had been very successful throughout the playoffs, came through in Game 5 to help give the Devils a 3–2 lead in the series. The line consisted of players Ryan Carter, Stephen Gionta and Steve Bernier, all of which had been dropped from a professional roster at some point during the season. Emerging as playoff heroes, they tallied an impressive 19 points in the first three rounds. Despite constant comparisons to the 1994 series, the Devils and Brodeur rewrote history and claimed victory on May 25, 2012, as Henrique scored another series clinching overtime goal in Game 6 to advance the Devils to the Stanley Cup Final against the Los Angeles Kings. Facing the Kings in the Final, the Devils lost two consecutive overtime games at home and then game three in Los Angeles. However, the Devils managed to not be swept after losing the first three games in the series, but still lost the Cup in six games.

== Standings ==
Atlantic Division
Pos	Team	GP	W	L	OTL	ROW	GF	GA	GD	Pts
1	New York Rangers	82	51	24	7	47	226	187	+39	109
2	Pittsburgh Penguins	82	51	25	6	42	282	221	+61	108
3	Philadelphia Flyers	82	47	26	9	43	264	232	+32	103
4	New Jersey Devils	82	48	28	6	36	228	209	+19	102
5	New York Islanders	82	34	37	11	27	203	255	−52	79

Source: National Hockey League

Eastern Conference
Pos	Div	Team	GP	W	L	OTL	ROW	GF	GA	GD	Pts
1	AT	z – New York Rangers	82	51	24	7	47	226	187	+39	109
2	NE	y – Boston Bruins	82	49	29	4	40	269	202	+67	102
3	SE	y – Florida Panthers	82	38	26	18	32	203	227	−24	94
4	AT	x – Pittsburgh Penguins	82	51	25	6	42	282	221	+61	108
5	AT	x – Philadelphia Flyers	82	47	26	9	43	264	232	+32	103
6	AT	x – New Jersey Devils	82	48	28	6	36	228	209	+19	102
7	SE	x – Washington Capitals	82	42	32	8	38	222	230	−8	92
8	NE	x – Ottawa Senators	82	41	31	10	35	249	240	+9	92
9	NE	Buffalo Sabres	82	39	32	11	32	218	230	−12	89
10	SE	Tampa Bay Lightning	82	38	36	8	35	235	281	−46	84
11	SE	Winnipeg Jets	82	37	35	10	33	225	246	−21	84
12	SE	Carolina Hurricanes	82	33	33	16	32	213	243	−30	82
13	NE	Toronto Maple Leafs	82	35	37	10	31	231	264	−33	80
14	AT	New York Islanders	82	34	37	11	27	203	255	−52	79
15	NE	Montreal Canadiens	82	31	35	16	26	212	226	−14	78

Source: National Hockey League
x – Clinched playoff spot; y – Clinched division; z – Clinched conference

== Schedule and results ==
=== Preseason ===
Preseason: 3–3–0 (Home: 2–1–0; Road: 1–2–0)

Game	Date	Opponent	Score	Location	Record
1	September 21	NY Rangers	2–1 (OT)	Times Union Center (Albany, New York)	1–0–0
2	September 23	NY Rangers	3–4	Prudential Center	1–1–0
3	September 24	NY Islanders	2–6	Nassau Veterans Memorial Coliseum	1–2–0
4	September 29	Philadelphia	1–2	Wells Fargo Center	1–3–0
5	September 30	NY Islanders	1–0	Prudential Center	2–3–0
6	October 1	Philadelphia	2–1	Prudential Center	3–3–0

Win Loss Overtime/Shootout Loss

=== Regular season ===
2011–12 Regular season game log: 48–28–6 (Home: 24–13–4; Road: 24–15–2)
October (Games: 9; Home: 4; Road: 5) (Record: 4–4–1; Home: 2–1–1; Road: 2–3–0)

Game	Date	Time (ET)	Opponent	Score	Location	Attendance	Record	Points
1	October 8	7:00pm	Philadelphia	0–3	Prudential Center	17,625	0–1–0	0
2	October 10	1:00pm	Carolina	4–2	Prudential Center	12,096	1–1–0	2
3	October 13	7:00pm	Los Angeles	2–1 SO	Prudential Center	12,256	2–1–0	4
4	October 15	8:00pm	@ Nashville	3–2 SO	Bridgestone Arena	17,113	3–1–0	6
5	October 21	7:00pm	San Jose	3–4 SO	Prudential Center	14,319	3–1–1	7
6	October 22	7:00pm	@ Pittsburgh	1–4	Consol Energy Center	18,535	3–2–1	7
7	October 25	10:30pm	@ Los Angeles	3–0	Staples Center	18,118	4–2–1	9
8	October 27	10:00pm	@ Phoenix	3–5	Jobing.com Arena	7,434	4–3–1	9
9	October 29	8:00pm	@ Dallas	1–3	American Airlines Center	11,740	4–4–1	9

November (Games: 14; Home: 6; Road: 8) (Record: 8–6–0; Home: 3–3–0; Road: 5–3–0)

Game	Date	Time (ET)	Opponent	Score	Location	Attendance	Record	Points
10	November 2	7:30pm	Toronto	3–5	Prudential Center	13,033	4–5–1	9
11	November 3	7:00pm	@ Philadelphia	4–3 SO	Wells Fargo Center	19,667	5–5–1	11
12	November 5	7:00pm	Winnipeg	3–2 OT	Prudential Center	14,952	6–5–1	13
13	November 8	7:30pm	Carolina	3–2	Prudential Center	13,056	7–5–1	15
14	November 11	7:00pm	Washington	1–3	Prudential Center	15,230	7–6–1	15
15	November 12	7:00pm	@ Washington	3–2 SO	Verizon Center	18,506	8–6–1	17
16	November 15	7:00pm	@ Boston	3–4	TD Garden	17,565	8–7–1	17
17	November 16	7:30pm	@ Buffalo	5–3	First Niagara Center	18,690	9–7–1	19
18	November 19	7:00pm	@ Tampa Bay	4–2	St. Pete Times Forum	18,894	10–7–1	21
19	November 21	7:30pm	@ Florida	3–4	BankAtlantic Center	13,122	10–8–1	21
20	November 23	7:00pm	Columbus	2–1 SO	Prudential Center	15,585	11–8–1	23
21	November 25	3:00pm	@ NY Islanders	1–0	Nassau Veterans Memorial Coliseum	15,358	12–8–1	25
22	November 26	1:00pm	NY Islanders	2–3	Prudential Center	16,014	12–9–1	25
23	November 30	9:30pm	@ Colorado	1–6	Pepsi Center	14,251	12–10–1	25

December (Games: 14; Home: 7; Road: 7) (Record: 9–5–0; Home: 5–2–0; Road: 4–3–0)

Game	Date	Time (ET)	Opponent	Score	Location	Attendance	Record	Points
24	December 2	8:00pm	@ Minnesota	2–4	XCel Energy Center	17,310	12–11–1	25
25	December 3	7:00pm	@ Winnipeg	2–4	MTS Centre	15,004	12–12–1	25
26	December 6	7:00pm	@ Toronto	3–2 OT	Air Canada Centre	19,513	13–12–1	27
27	December 8	7:00pm	Ottawa	5–4 SO	Prudential Center	13,743	14–12–1	29
28	December 10	1:00pm	Montreal	1–2	Prudential Center	14,210	14–13–1	29
29	December 12	7:00pm	@ Tampa Bay	5–4	St. Pete Times Forum	17,341	15–13–1	31
30	December 13	7:30pm	@ Florida	3–2 SO	BankAtlantic Center	14,669	16–13–1	33
31	December 16	7:00pm	Dallas	6–3	Prudential Center	17,625	17–13–1	35
32	December 17	7:00pm	@ Montreal	5–3	Bell Centre	21,273	18–13–1	37
33	December 20	7:00pm	NY Rangers	1–4	Prudential Center	17,625	18–14–1	37
34	December 23	7:00pm	Washington	4–3 SO	Prudential Center	14,043	19–14–1	39
35	December 26	7:00pm	@ Carolina	2–4	RBC Center	16,121	19–15–1	39
36	December 28	7:00pm	Buffalo	3–1	Prudential Center	17,625	20–15–1	41
37	December 31	3:00pm	Pittsburgh	3–1	Prudential Center	17,625	21–15–1	43

January (Games: 12; Home: 7; Road: 5) (Record: 6–4–2; Home: 3–3–1; Road: 3–1–1)

Game	Date	Time (ET)	Opponent	Score	Location	Attendance	Record	Points
38	January 2	7:30pm	@ Ottawa	2–3 OT	Scotiabank Place	19,573	21–15–2	44
39	January 4	7:30pm	Boston	1–6	Prudential Center	15,832	21–16–2	44
40	January 6	7:00pm	Florida	5–2	Prudential Center	15,793	22–16–2	46
41	January 7	7:00pm	@ Pittsburgh	3–1	Consol Energy Center	18,594	23–16–2	48
42	January 10	9:30pm	@ Calgary	3–6	Scotiabank Saddledome	19,289	23–17–2	48
43	January 11	9:00pm	@ Edmonton	2–1 OT	Rexall Place	16,839	24–17–2	50
44	January 14	3:00pm	@ Winnipeg	2–1	MTS Centre	15,004	25–17–2	52
45	January 17	7:00pm	Winnipeg	5–1	Prudential Center	14,129	26–17–2	54
46	January 19	7:00pm	Boston	1–4	Prudential Center	14,941	26–18–2	54
47	January 21	1:00pm	Philadelphia	1–4	Prudential Center	16,251	26–19–2	54
48	January 24	7:00pm	Buffalo	1–2 SO	Prudential Center	13,735	26–19–3	55
49	January 31	7:00pm	NY Rangers	4–3 SO	Prudential Center	17,625	27–19–3	57

February (Games: 13; Home: 7; Road: 6) (Record: 8–4–1; Home: 3–2–1; Road: 5–2–0)

Game	Date	Time (ET)	Opponent	Score	Location	Attendance	Record	Points
50	February 2	7:00pm	Montreal	5–3	Prudential Center	13,283	28–19–3	59
51	February 4	1:00pm	@ Philadelphia	6–4	Wells Fargo Center	19,862	29–19–3	61
52	February 5	1:00pm	Pittsburgh	5–3	Prudential Center	14,707	30–19–3	63
53	February 7	7:00pm	@ NY Rangers	1–0	Madison Square Garden	18,200	31–19–3	65
54	February 9	7:00pm	St. Louis	3–4 SO	Prudential Center	15,021	31–19–4	66
55	February 11	1:00pm	Florida	1–3	Prudential Center	14,938	31–20–4	66
56	February 14	7:00pm	@ Buffalo	4–1	First Niagara Center	18,690	32–20–4	68
57	February 17	7:00pm	Anaheim	3–2 SO	Prudential Center	15,312	33–20–4	70
58	February 19	6:00pm	@ Montreal	3–1	Bell Centre	21,273	34–20–4	72
59	February 21	7:00pm	@ Toronto	4–3 OT	Air Canada Centre	19,426	35–20–4	74
60	February 24	7:00pm	Vancouver	1–2	Prudential Center	16,480	35–21–4	74
61	February 26	1:00pm	Tampa Bay	3–4	Prudential Center	15,981	35–22–4	74
62	February 27	7:30pm	@ NY Rangers	0–2	Madison Square Garden	18,200	35–23–4	74

March (Games: 17; Home: 8; Road: 9) (Record: 10–5–2; Home: 6–1–1; Road: 4–4–1)

Game	Date	Time (ET)	Opponent	Score	Location	Attendance	Record	Points
63	March 1	7:00pm	@ Boston	3–4 OT	TD Garden	17,565	35–23–5	75
64	March 2	7:00pm	@ Washington	5–0	Verizon Center	18,506	36–23–5	77
65	March 4	3:00pm	@ NY Islanders	0–1	Nassau Veterans Memorial Coliseum	16,250	36–24–5	77
66	March 6	7:00pm	NY Rangers	4–1	Prudential Center	17,625	37–24–5	79
67	March 8	7:00pm	NY Islanders	5–1	Prudential Center	14,573	38–24–5	81
68	March 10	7:00pm	@ NY Islanders	2–1	Nassau Veterans Memorial Coliseum	16,250	39–24–5	83
69	March 11	7:00pm	Philadelphia	4–1	Prudential Center	15,107	40–24–5	85
70	March 13	7:00pm	@ Philadelphia	0–3	Wells Fargo Center	19,724	40–25–5	85
71	March 15	7:00pm	Colorado	1–0 SO	Prudential Center	16,055	41–25–5	87
72	March 17	1:00pm	Pittsburgh	2–5	Prudential Center	17,625	41–26–5	87
73	March 19	7:30pm	@ NY Rangers	2–4	Madison Square Garden	18,200	41–27–5	87
74	March 20	7:30pm	@ Ottawa	1–0	Scotiabank Place	19,834	42–27–5	89
75	March 23	7:00pm	Toronto	3–4 SO	Prudential Center	16,022	42–27–6	90
76	March 25	7:00pm	@ Pittsburgh	2–5	Consol Energy Center	18,601	42–28–6	90
77	March 27	7:00pm	Chicago	2–1 SO	Prudential Center	15,074	43–28–6	92
78	March 29	7:00pm	Tampa Bay	6–4	Prudential Center	15,380	44–28–6	94
79	March 31	7:00pm	@ Carolina	5–0	RBC Center	18,680	45–28–6	96

April (Games: 3; Home: 2; Road: 1) (Record: 3–0–0; Home: 2–0–0; Road: 1–0–0)

Game	Date	Time (ET)	Opponent	Score	Location	Attendance	Record	Points
80	April 3	7:00pm	NY Islanders	3–1	Prudential Center	15,482	46–28–6	98
81	April 5	7:30pm	@ Detroit	2–1	Joe Louis Arena	20,066	47–28–6	100
82	April 7	3:00pm	Ottawa	4-2	Prudential Center	17,625	48–28–6	102

=== Playoffs ===
2012 Stanley Cup Playoffs
Eastern Conference Quarter-finals: vs. (3) Florida Panthers – Devils win series 4–3

#	Date	Visitor	Score	Home	OT	Decision	Attendance	Series	Recap
1	April 13	New Jersey Devils	3–2	Florida Panthers		Brodeur	19,119	Devils lead 1-0	New Jersey Devils - Florida Panthers - April 13th, 2012
2	April 15	New Jersey Devils	2–4	Florida Panthers		Brodeur	19,248	Series tied 1-1	New Jersey Devils - Florida Panthers - April 15th, 2012
3	April 17	Florida Panthers	4–3	New Jersey Devils		Hedberg	17,625	Panthers lead 2-1	Florida Panthers - New Jersey Devils - April 17th, 2012
4	April 19	Florida Panthers	0–4	New Jersey Devils		Brodeur	17,625	Series tied 2-2	Florida Panthers - New Jersey Devils - April 19th, 2012
5	April 21	New Jersey Devils	0–3	Florida Panthers		Brodeur	19,513	Panthers lead 3-2	New Jersey Devils - Florida Panthers - April 21st, 2012
6	April 24	Florida Panthers	2–3	New Jersey Devils	OT	Brodeur	17,625	Series tied 3-3	Florida Panthers - New Jersey Devils - April 24th, 2012
7	April 26	New Jersey Devils	3–2	Florida Panthers	2OT	Brodeur	19,313	Devils win 4-3	New Jersey Devils - Florida Panthers - April 26th, 2012

Eastern Conference Semi-finals: vs. (5) Philadelphia Flyers – Devils win series 4-1

#	Date	Visitor	Score	Home	OT	Decision	Attendance	Series	Recap
1	April 29	New Jersey Devils	3–4	Philadelphia Flyers	OT	Brodeur	19,972	Flyers lead 1-0	Devils vs. Flyers - 04/29/2012 - New Jersey Devils - Recap
2	May 1	New Jersey Devils	4–1	Philadelphia Flyers		Brodeur	20,131	Series tied 1-1	Devils vs. Flyers - 05/01/2012 - New Jersey Devils - Recap
3	May 3	Philadelphia Flyers	3–4	New Jersey Devils	OT	Brodeur	17,625	Devils lead 2-1	Flyers vs. Devils - 05/03/2012 - New Jersey Devils - Recap
4	May 6	Philadelphia Flyers	2–4	New Jersey Devils		Brodeur	17,625	Devils lead 3-1	Flyers vs. Devils - 05/06/2012 - New Jersey Devils - Recap
5	May 8	New Jersey Devils	3–1	Philadelphia Flyers		Brodeur	20,145	Devils win 4-1	Flyers vs. Devils - 05/06/2012 - New Jersey Devils - Recap

Eastern Conference Finals: vs. (1) New York Rangers – Devils win series 4-2

#	Date	Visitor	Score	Home	OT	Decision	Attendance	Series	Recap
1	May 14	New Jersey Devils	0–3	New York Rangers		Brodeur	18,200	Rangers lead 1-0	
2	May 16	New Jersey Devils	3–2	New York Rangers		Brodeur	18,200	Series tied 1-1	Devils vs. Rangers - 05/16/2012 - New Jersey Devils - Recap
3	May 19	New York Rangers	3–0	New Jersey Devils		Brodeur	17,625	Rangers lead 2-1	
4	May 21	New York Rangers	1–4	New Jersey Devils		Brodeur	17,625	Series tied 2-2	Rangers vs. Devils - 05/21/2012 - New Jersey Devils - Recap
5	May 23	New Jersey Devils	5–3	New York Rangers		Brodeur	18,200	Devils lead 3-2	Devils vs. Rangers - 05/23/2012 - New Jersey Devils - Recap
6	May 25	New York Rangers	2–3	New Jersey Devils	OT	Brodeur	17,625	Devils win series 4-2	Rangers vs. Devils - 05/25/2012 - New Jersey Devils - Recap

Stanley Cup Final: vs (8) Los Angeles Kings – Kings win series 4-2

#	Date	Visitor	Score	Home	OT	Decision	Attendance	Series	Recap
1	May 30	Los Angeles Kings	2–1	New Jersey Devils	OT	Brodeur	17,625	Kings lead 1-0	Kings vs. Devils - 05/30/2012 - New Jersey Devils - Recap
2	June 2	Los Angeles Kings	2–1	New Jersey Devils	OT	Brodeur	17,625	Kings lead 2-0	Kings vs. Devils - 06/02/2012 - New Jersey Devils - Recap
3	June 4	New Jersey Devils	0–4	Los Angeles Kings		Brodeur	18,764	Kings lead 3-0	Devils vs. Kings - 06/04/2012 - New Jersey Devils - Recap
4	June 6	New Jersey Devils	3–1	Los Angeles Kings		Brodeur	18,867	Kings lead 3-1	Devils vs. Kings - 06/06/2012 - New Jersey Devils - Recap
5	June 9	Los Angeles Kings	1–2	New Jersey Devils		Brodeur	17,625	Kings lead 3-2	Kings vs. Devils - 06/09/2012 - New Jersey Devils - Recap
6	June 11	New Jersey Devils	1–6	Los Angeles Kings		Brodeur	18,858	Kings win 4-2	Devils vs. Kings - 06/11/2012 - New Jersey Devils - Recap

Win Loss Win Playoff Series

== Media ==
This season would be Steve Cangialosi's first season as a regular television play-by-play announcer for the Devils. Deb Placey and Ken Daneyko did color and studio analysis commentating. Radio coverage was still on WFAN (AM) 660 with Matt Loughlin and Sherry Ross as usual.

== Player statistics ==
=== Skaters ===
Note: GP = Games played; G = Goals; A = Assists; Pts = Points; +/− = Plus/Minus; PIM = Penalty Minutes

Regular season									Playoffs					
#	Pos.	Player	GP	G	A	Pts	+/−	PIM	GP	G	A	Pts	+/−	PIM
17	Ilya Kovalchuk	W	77	37	46	83	-9	33	23	8	11	19	-7	6
26	Patrik Elias	LW/C	81	26	52	78	-8	16	24	5	3	8	-3	10
9	Zach Parise	LW	82	31	38	69	-5	32	24	8	7	15	-8	4
14	Adam Henrique	C	74	16	35	51	8	7	24	5	8	13	12	11
23	David Clarkson	RW	80	30	16	46	-8	138	24	3	9	12	8	32
15	Petr Sykora	W	82	21	23	44	4	40	18	2	3	5	3	6
8	Dainius Zubrus	C/RW	82	17	27	44	7	34	24	3	7	10	0	18
12	Alexei Ponikarovsky^{†}	LW	33	7	11	18	9	8	24	1	8	9	8	12
5	Adam Larsson	D	65	2	16	18	-7	20	5	1	0	1	3	4
29	Mark Fayne	D	82	4	13	17	-4	26	24	0	3	3	5	6
6	Andy Greene	D	56	1	15	16	3	16	24	0	1	1	1	8
2	Kurtis Foster^{†‡}	D	28	3	9	12	-9	23						
28	Anton Volchenkov	D	72	2	9	11	3	34	24	1	1	2	7	10
24	Bryce Salvador	D	82	0	9	9	18	66	24	4	10	14	9	26
16	Jacob Josefson	C	41	2	7	9	10	6	6	0	1	1	1	0
2	Marek Zidlicky^{†}	D	22	2	6	8	0	10	24	1	8	9	-2	22
20	Ryan Carter^{†}	C/LW	65	4	4	8	-12	84	23	5	2	7	4	32
32	Matt Taormina	D	30	1	6	7	6	4	—	—	—	—	—	—
12	Nick Palmieri^{‡}	LW	29	4	3	7	-7	12						
7	Henrik Tallinder	D	39	0	6	6	-11	16	3	0	0	0	-1	0
– (Note: Mattias Tedenby wore #21 until sent to minors mid-season. #21 was later taken by Tim Sestito. Recalled during the playoffs. Unclear if Tedenby was later assigned a new number as a healthy scratch for the entire playoffs.)	Mattias Tedenby	LW	43	1	5	6	-15	16	—	—	—	—	—	—
18	Steve Bernier	RW	32	1	5	6	6	16	24	2	5	7	3	27
19	Travis Zajac	C	15	2	4	6	-3	4	24	7	7	14	-6	4
10 (Note: Peter Harrold originally wore #21 until #10 became available when Steven Zalewski was sent to the minors.)	Peter Harrold	D	11	0	2	2	0	0	17	0	4	4	2	6
– (Note: Bradley Mills wore #11 until sent to minors mid-season. #11 was later taken by Stephen Gionta. Recalled during the playoffs. Unclear if Mills was later assigned a new number as a healthy scratch for the entire playoffs.)	Bradley Mills	C	27	0	1	1	-10	32	—	—	—	—	—	—
33	Alexander Urbom	D	5	1	0	1	1	9	—	—	—	—	—	—
25	Cam Janssen	RW	48	0	1	1	-8	75	—	—	—	—	—	—
11	Stephen Gionta	RW/C	1	1	0	1	1	0	24	3	4	7	4	4
– (Note: Steven Zalewski wore #10 until sent to minors mid-season. #10 was later taken by Peter Harrold. Recalled during the playoffs. Unclear if Zalewski was later assigned a new number as a healthy scratch for the entire playoffs.)	Steven Zalewski	C	7	0	0	0	-2	0	—	—	—	—	—	—
21	Tim Sestito	C	18	0	0	0	-5	7	1	0	0	0	0	0
– (Note: Vladimir Zharkov wore #18 until sent to minors mid-season. #18 was later taken by Steve Bernier. Recalled during the playoffs. Unclear if Zharkov was later assigned a new number as a healthy scratch for the entire playoffs.)	Vladimir Zharkov	RW	4	0	0	0	-2	0	—	—	—	—	—	—
22	Eric Boulton	LW	51	0	0	0	-12	115	—	—	—	—	—	—
11	Stephane Veilleux^{‡}	LW	1	0	0	0	0	0						
2	Mark Fraser^{‡}	D	4	0	0	0	-2	14						
10	Rod Pelley^{‡}	C	7	0	0	0	0	7						

- ^{†} Denotes player spent time with another team before joining Devils. Stats reflect time with Devils only.
- ^{‡}Traded mid-season. Stats reflect time with Devils only.

=== Goaltenders ===
Note: Pos = Position;GP = Games played; Min, TOI = Minutes played; W = Wins; L = Losses; T,T/OT = Ties; OTL = Overtime losses; GA = Goals-against; GAA = Goals-against average; SO = Shutouts; SA = Shots against; SV = Shots saved; SV% = Save percentage;

Regular season
#	Player	GP	Min	W	L	OT	GA	GAA	SA	Sv%	SO	G	A	PIM
30	Martin Brodeur	59	3392	31	21	4	136	2.41	1472	.908	3	0	4	2
1	Johan Hedberg	27	1591	17	7	2	59	2.23	718	.918	4	0	0	2

Playoffs
#	Player	GP	Min	W	L	GA	GAA	SA	Sv%	SO	G	A	PIM
30	Martin Brodeur	24	1471	14	9	52	2.12	629	.917	1	0	4	0
1	Johan Hedberg	1	36	0	1	1	1.67	14	.929	0	0	0	0

- ^{†} Denotes player spent time with another team before joining Devils. Stats reflect time with Devils only.
- ^{‡}Traded mid-season. Stats reflect time with Devils only.

== Awards and records ==
=== Awards ===
Regular season
Player	Award	Awarded
Ilya Kovalchuk	NHL first All-Star team – Left Wing	End of regular season
Adam Henrique	NHL All-Rookie team – Forward	End of regular season
Adam Henrique	NHL Rookie of the Month	December 2011
Ilya Kovalchuk	NHL Second Star of the Week	February 6, 2012
Ilya Kovalchuk	NHL Second Star of the Week	March 12, 2012

=== Nominations ===
Regular season
Player	Award	Place
Adam Henrique	Calder Memorial Trophy	Finalist

=== Records ===
Player	Record (Amount)	Achieved

=== Milestones ===
Regular season
Player	Milestone	Date
Adam Larsson	1st career NHL game	October 8, 2011
David Clarkson	300th career NHL game	October 10, 2011
Henrik Tallinder	100th career NHL assist	October 15, 2011
Adam Henrique	1st career NHL assist 1st career NHL point	October 27, 2011
Andy Greene	300th career NHL game	October 29, 2011
Brad Mills	1st career NHL assist	November 2, 2011
Adam Larsson	1st career NHL assist 1st career NHL point	November 2, 2011
Adam Henrique	1st career NHL goal	November 3, 2011
Dainius Zubrus	500th career NHL point	November 8, 2011
Adam Larsson	1st career NHL goal	November 11, 2011
Anton Volchenkov	500th career NHL game	November 12, 2011
Dainius Zubrus	1,000th career NHL game	November 16, 2011
Ryan Carter	200th career NHL game	November 19, 2011
Patrik Elias	500th career NHL assist	December 28, 2011
Dainius Zubrus	200th career NHL goal	January 2, 2012
Patrik Elias	1,000th career NHL game	January 6, 2012
Zach Parise	200th career NHL assist	January 10, 2012
Mark Fayne	100th career NHL game	January 11, 2012
Petr Sykora	700th career NHL point	January 14, 2012
Mattias Tedenby	100th career NHL game	January 14, 2012
Alexei Ponikarovsky	300th career NHL point	February 4, 2012
Cam Janssen	300th career NHL game	February 14, 2012
Steve Bernier	400th career NHL game	March 1, 2012
Petr Sykora	1,000th career NHL game	March 4, 2012
Bryce Salvador	100th career NHL point	March 6, 2012
Zach Parise	400th career NHL point	March 8, 2012
Marek Zidlicky	300th career NHL point	March 8, 2012
Andy Greene	100th career NHL point	March 17, 2012
Ilya Kovalchuk	400th career NHL goal	March 20, 2012
Zach Parise	500th career NHL game	April 3, 2012
Eric Boulton	600th career NHL game	April 5, 2012
Stephen Gionta	1st career NHL goal 1st career NHL point	April 7, 2012

== Transactions ==
The Devils have been involved in the following transactions during the 2011–12 season.

=== Trades ===
Date	Details
June 16, 2011	To Minnesota Wild David McIntyre	To New Jersey Devils Maxim Noreau
July 14, 2011	To Calgary Flames Pierre-Luc Letourneau-Leblond	To New Jersey Devils 5th round pick in 2012
July 28, 2011	To New York Islanders Brian Rolston	To New Jersey Devils Trent Hunter; Conditional pick in 2012 (Note: Condition not satisfied.)
October 4, 2011	To Toronto Maple Leafs Dave Steckel	To New Jersey Devils 4th-round pick in 2012
December 12, 2011	To Anaheim Ducks Mark Fraser; Rod Pelley; 7th-round pick in 2012	To New Jersey Devils Kurtis Foster; Timo Pielmeier
January 20, 2012	To Carolina Hurricanes Joe Sova; 4th-round pick in 2012	To New Jersey Devils Alexei Ponikarovsky
February 24, 2012	To Minnesota Wild Kurtis Foster; Nick Palmieri; Stephane Veilleux; 2nd-round pick in 2012; Conditional 3rd-round pick in 2013 (Note: Condition satisfied.)	To New Jersey Devils Marek Zidlicky

=== Free agents signed ===
Player	Former team	Contract terms
Cam Janssen	St. Louis Blues	1 year, $525,000
Eric Boulton	Atlanta Thrashers	2 years, $1.325 million
Peter Harrold	Los Angeles Kings	1 year, $550,000
Matt Anderson	Albany Devils	2 years, $1.05 million
Stephane Veilleux	HC Ambri-Piotta	1 year, $525,000
Petr Sykora	Dinamo Minsk	1 year, $650,000
Steve Bernier	Albany Devils	1 year, $525,000

=== Free agents lost ===
Player	New team	Contract terms
Tyler Eckford	Phoenix Coyotes	1 year, $525,000
Mike McKenna	Ottawa Senators	1 year, $550,000
Colin White	San Jose Sharks	1 year, $1 million
Trent Hunter	Los Angeles Kings	1 year, $600,000

=== Claimed via waivers ===
Player	Former team	Date claimed off waivers
Ryan Carter	Florida Panthers	October 26, 2011

=== Lost via waivers ===
Player	New team	Date claimed off waivers

=== Player signings ===
Player	Date	Contract terms
Brandon Burlon	June 2, 2011	3 years, $1.9875 million entry-level contract
Jay Leach	June 22, 2011	1 year, $525,000
Andy Greene	July 1, 2011	4 years, $12 million
Johan Hedberg	July 1, 2011	1 year, $1.25 million
Matt Corrente	July 14, 2011	1 year, $660,000
Vladimir Zharkov	July 14, 2011	1 year, $577,500
Adam Larsson	July 15, 2011	3 years, $2.775 million entry-level contract
Mark Fraser	July 27, 2011	1 year, $550,000
Matt Taormina	July 27, 2011	1 year, $550,000
Zach Parise	July 29, 2011	1 year, $6 million
Maxime Clermont	August 22, 2011	3 years, $1.68 million entry-level contract
Brad Mills	August 22, 2011	1 year, $525,000
Tim Sestito	August 22, 2011	1 year, $525,000
Chad Wiseman	August 22, 2011	2 years, $1.05 million
Steven Zalewski	August 22, 2011	2 years, $1.05 million
Scott Wedgewood	March 19, 2012	3 years, $1.92 million entry-level contract

== Draft picks ==
The New Jersey Devils participated in the 2011 NHL entry draft, located at the Xcel Energy Center in Saint Paul, Minnesota, on June 24, 2011. Devils CEO, president and general manager Lou Lamoriello, described as being "thrilled" at the chance to draft him, selected Swedish defenseman Adam Larsson fourth overall. This was the Devils' highest pick in the draft since selecting Scott Neidermayer third overall in the 1991 NHL entry draft.

Round	#	Player	Pos	Nationality	College/Junior/Club team (League)
1	4	Adam Larsson	D	Sweden	Skelleftea AIK (Elitserien)
3	69 (Note: The New Jersey Devils' third-round pick was forfeited as a result of a penalty sanction due to cap circumvention when signing Ilya Kovalchuk. The penalty includes a fine of US$3 million, a forfeiture of one first-round pick between 2011 and 2014 as determined by the Devils, and this pick.)	Forfeited pick			
3	75 (Note: The Dallas Stars' third-round pick went to the New Jersey Devils as the result of a trade on January 7, 2011 that sent Jamie Langenbrunner to Dallas in exchange for a conditional pick in 2012 NHL entry draft and this pick (conditional at the time of the trade). The condition – Dallas Stars does not win a round of the 2011 Stanley Cup playoffs and does not re-sign Langenbrunner prior to the 2011 Draft – was converted on June 24, 2011.)	Blake Coleman	C	United States	Indiana Ice (USHL)
4	99	Reid Boucher	C	United States	U.S. National Team Development Program (USHL)
5	129	Blake Pietila	LW	United States	U.S. National Team Development Program (USHL)
6	159	Reece Scarlett	D	Canada	Swift Current Broncos (WHL)
7	189	Patrick Daly	D	United States	Benilde-St. Margaret's High School

== See also ==
- 2011–12 NHL season
