= List of Kansas City Scouts seasons =

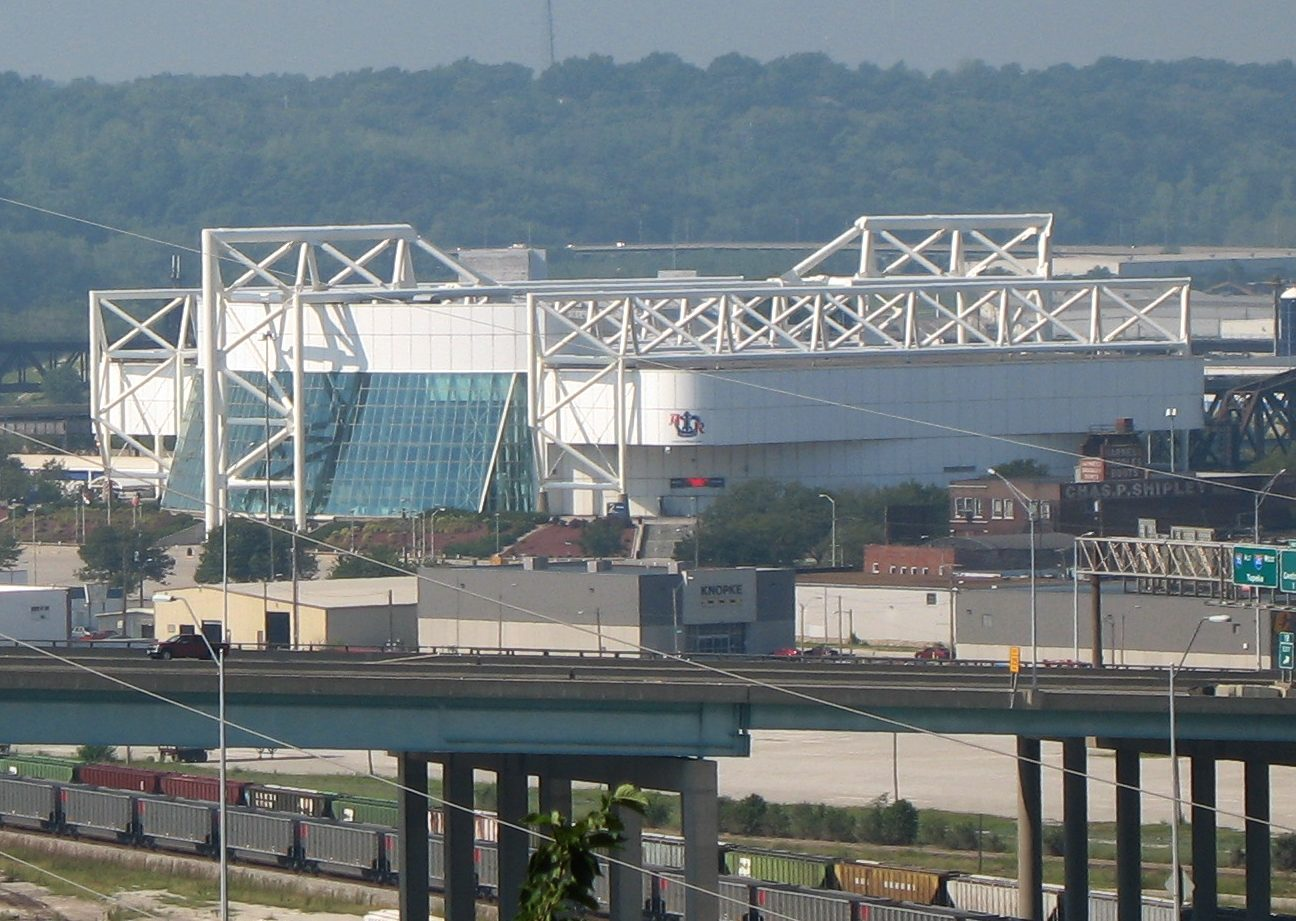
Kemper Arena was the home of the Scouts for two seasons.

The Kansas City Scouts were a professional ice hockey team based in Kansas City, Missouri. The team was a member of the Smythe Division of the Campbell Conference of the National Hockey League (NHL). The Scouts joined the NHL in 1974, along with the Washington Capitals. The Scouts played at Kemper Arena. Poor attendance, financial mismanagement, and the team's poor play led the franchise to move to Denver, Colorado in 1976, where it was rechristened the Colorado Rockies. The team would later move to New Jersey, where it found success as the New Jersey Devils, and the team remains there to this day.

The team would finish at the bottom of the Smythe Division for two years, missing the playoffs both times. In fact, the only team to fare worse than the Scouts in the two seasons were its expansion brethren, the Capitals, who set an NHL record by winning only 8 games in the 1974–75 season.

== Table key ==
Key of terms and abbreviations
Term or abbreviation	Definition
Finish	Final position in division or league standings
GP	Number of games played
W	Number of wins
L	Number of losses
T	Number of ties
Pts	Number of points
GF	Goals for (goals scored by the Scouts)
GA	Goals against (goals scored by the Scouts' opponents)
—	Does not apply

== Year by year ==
NHL season	Scouts season	Conference	Division	Regular season									Postseason						
NHL season	Scouts season	Conference	Division	Finish	GP	W	L	T	OTL	Pts	GF	GA	GP	W	L	T	GF	GA	Result
1974–75	1974–75	Campbell	Smythe	5th	80	15	54	11	—	41	184	328	—	—	—	—	—	—	Did not qualify
1975–76	1975–76	Campbell	Smythe	5th	80	12	56	12	—	36	190	351	—	—	—	—	—	—	Did not qualify
Relocated to Colorado
Totals					160	27	110	23	—	77	374	679	—	—	—	—	—	—	

== See also ==
- List of Colorado Rockies (NHL) seasons
- List of New Jersey Devils seasons
