= Chadwicks, New York =

- Census-designated place
- Location within New York Location within the United States
- Coordinates: 43°01′40″N 75°16′18″W
- Country: United States
- State: New York
- County: Oneida

Area
  - Total: 1.32 sq mi (3.42 km^{2})
  - Land: 1.32 sq mi (3.42 km^{2})
  - Water: 0 sq mi (0.00 km^{2})

Population (2020)
  - Total: 1,291
  - Density: 977.4/sq mi (377.38/km^{2})
- Time zone: UTC-5 (Eastern (EST))
  - Summer (DST): UTC-4 (EDT)
- ZIP Codes: 13319 (Chadwicks); 13413 (New Hartford)
- Area code: 315
- FIPS code: 36-13662

Chadwicks is a census-designated place in the town of New Hartford in Oneida County, New York, United States. As of the 2020 census, Chadwicks had a population of 1,291. Chadwicks is part of the Utica–Rome Metropolitan Statistical Area.

Currently, residents of Chadwicks attend local schooling from the nearby hamlet of Sauquoit.

The killing of Lucas Leonard occurred in Chadwicks in 2015.

== Demographics ==
Historical population
| Census | Pop. | Note | %± |
|---|---|---|---|
| 2020 | 1,291 | | — |
U.S. Decennial Census
