= St. Stephen's Church (New Hartford, New York) =

Historic church in New York, United States

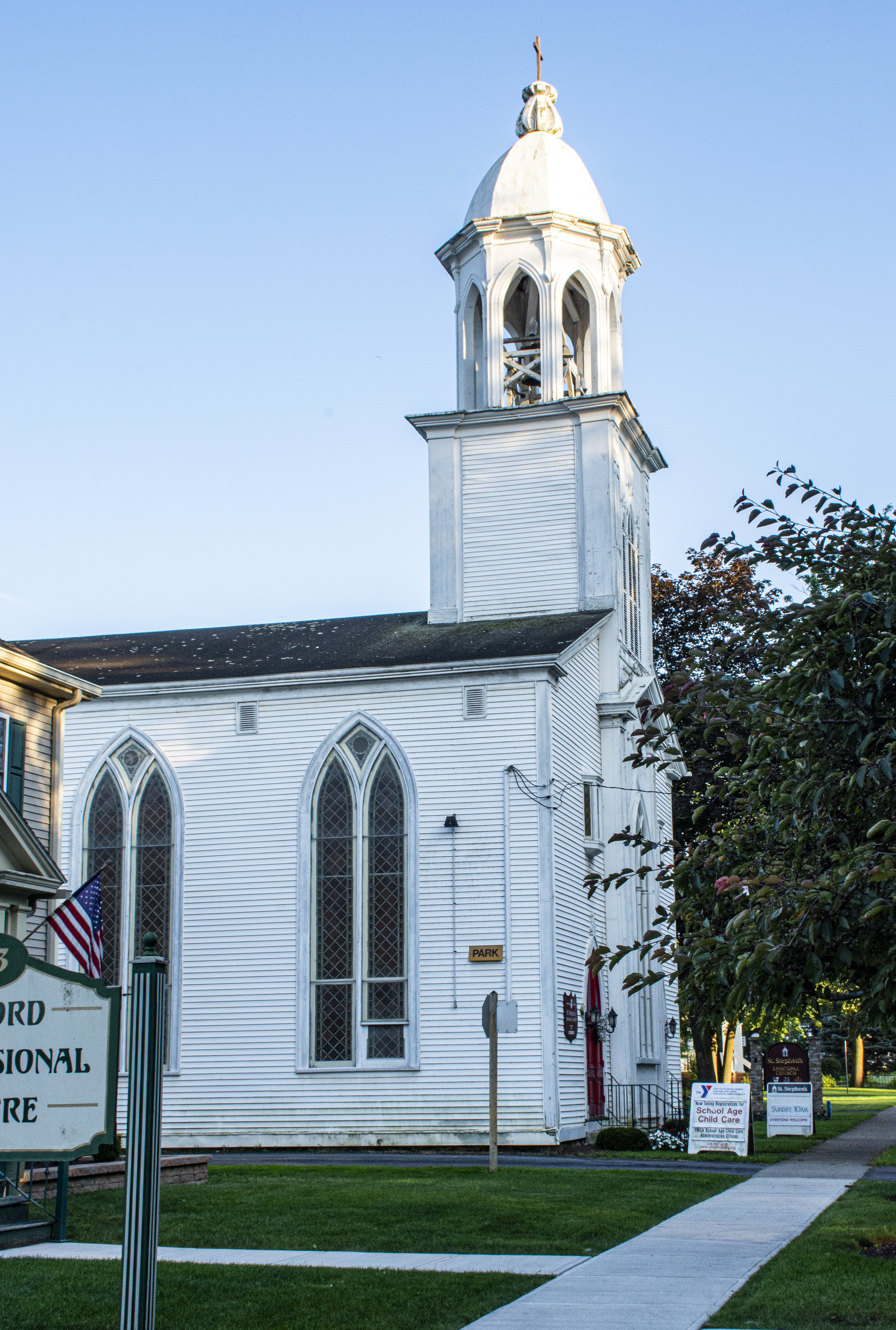

Religion
- Affiliation: Episcopal Church (United States)
- District: Diocese of Central New York
- Ecclesiastical or organizational status: Church

Location
- Location: 25 Oxford Road; New Hartford, New York, United States
- Interactive map of St. Stephen's Church
- Coordinates: 43°4′17″N 75°17′12″W

Architecture
- Type: Federal
- Style: Greek Revival
- Completed: 1825
- Direction of façade: Southwest

U.S. National Register of Historic Places
- Added to NRHP: August 30, 1996
- NRHP Reference no.: 96000959

St. Stephen's Church is a historic church at 22-27 Oxford Street in New Hartford, Oneida County, New York. It was built in 1825 and is a rectangular timber framed Federal style structure with selected Gothic detail. It features a central pavilion and two-stage tower composed of a square lower level and octagonal belfry with domed cap. A Gothic Revival parish house ell was attached to the main block in 1912 and subsequently enlarged in the 1950s.

It was listed on the National Register of Historic Places in 1996.
