= List of Colorado Rockies (NHL) seasons =

The following is a list of seasons played by the Colorado Rockies hockey franchise.

== Table key ==
Key of terms and abbreviations
Term or abbreviation	Definition
Finish	Final position in division or league standings
GP	Number of games played
W	Number of wins
L	Number of losses
T	Number of ties
Pts	Number of points
GF	Goals for (goals scored by the Scouts)
GA	Goals against (goals scored by the Scouts' opponents)
—	Does not apply

== Year by year ==
Season	Team	Conference	Division	Regular season								Postseason					
Season	Team	Conference	Division	Finish	GP	W	L	T	Pts	GF	GA	GP	W	L	GF	GA	Result
Relocated from Kansas City
1976–77	1976–77	Campbell	Smythe	5th	80	20	46	14	54	226	307	—	—	—	—	—	Did not qualify
1977–78	1977–78	Campbell	Smythe	2nd	80	19	40	21	59	257	305	2	0	2	3	6	Lost in preliminary round vs. Philadelphia Flyers, 0–2
1978–79	1978–79	Campbell	Smythe	4th	80	15	53	12	42	210	331	—	—	—	—	—	Did not qualify
1979–80	1979–80	Campbell	Smythe	6th	80	19	48	13	51	234	308	—	—	—	—	—	Did not qualify
1980–81	1980–81	Campbell	Smythe	5th	80	22	45	13	57	258	344	—	—	—	—	—	Did not qualify
1981–82	1981–82	Campbell	Smythe	5th	80	18	49	13	49	241	362	—	—	—	—	—	Did not qualify
Relocated to New Jersey
Totals					480	113	281	86	312	1,426	1,957	2	0	2	3	6	1 playoff appearance
