= Mike Zalewski =

American ice hockey player (born 1992)

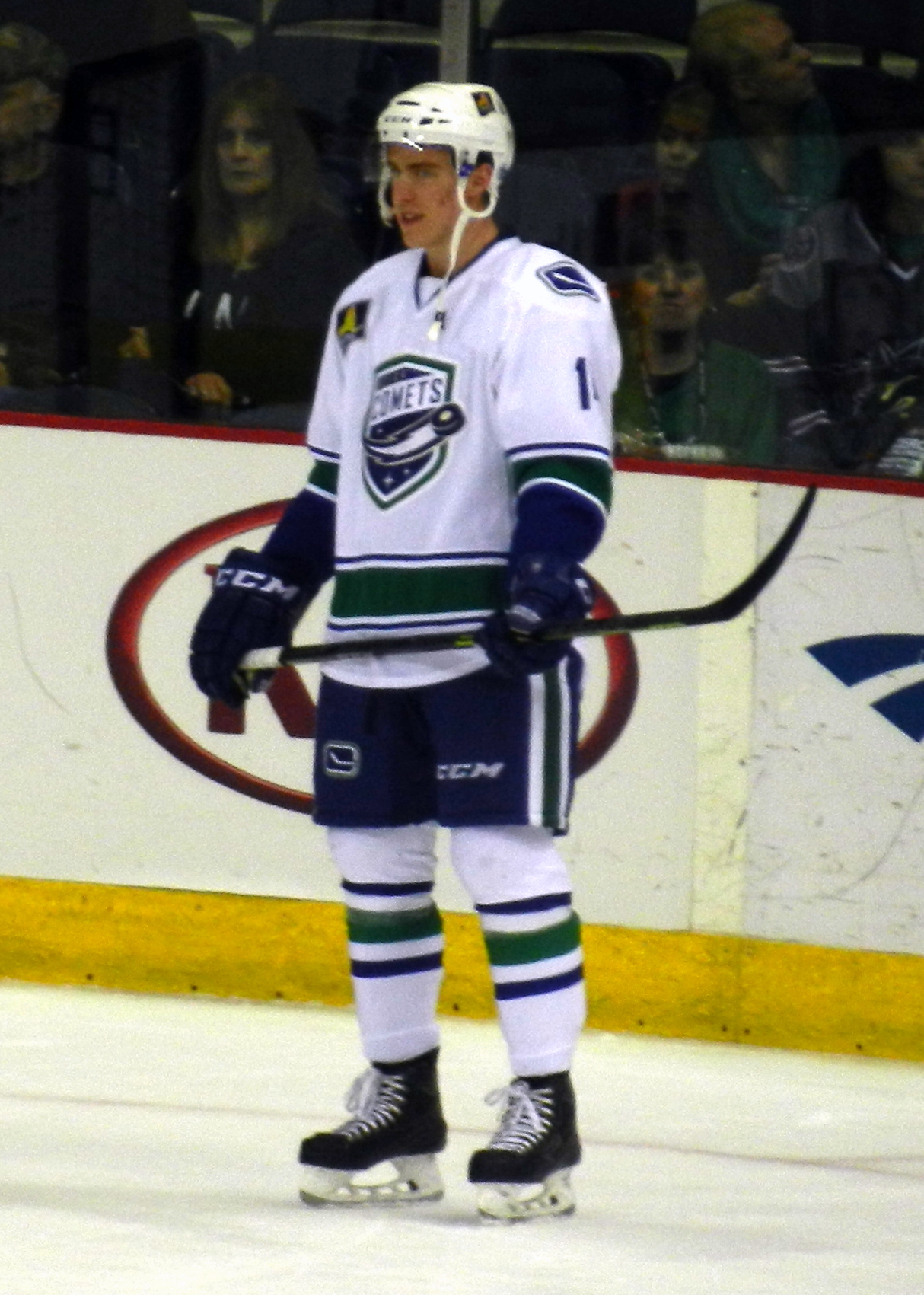
- Zalewski playing for the Utica Comets
- Born: August 18, 1992 (age 34) New Hartford, New York, U S.
- Height: 6 ft 2 in (188 cm)
- Weight: 209 lb (95 kg; 14 st 13 lb)
- Position: Left wing
- Shoots: Left
- ICEHL team Former teams: EC KAC; Vancouver Canucks; Straubing Tigers; Kölner Haie; Vienna Capitals; Graz99ers
- NHL draft: Undrafted
- Playing career: 2014–present

Michael Zalewski (born August 18, 1992) is an American professional ice hockey player. He is currently under contract with EC KAC of the ICE Hockey League (ICEHL). Zalewski has previously played with the Vancouver Canucks of the National Hockey League (NHL).

== Playing career ==
As a youth, Zalewski played in the 2005 Quebec International Pee-Wee Hockey Tournament with a minor ice hockey team from Syracuse, New York. He later played one season with the Syracuse Stars of the Eastern Junior Hockey League.

Zalewski was drafted 122nd overall by the Youngstown Phantoms in the USHL entry draft, but did not sign with the team. This was followed by two seasons in British Columbia with the Vernon Vipers of the BCHL. He committed to playing Division I college hockey for the Rensselaer Polytechnic Institute in 2010 while playing with the Vipers. After leaving the BCHL following the 2011–12 season, Zalewski attended the Rensselaer Polytechnic Institute where he played two seasons (2012–14) of NCAA Division I hockey with the RPI Engineers, registering 21 goals, 26 assists, 47 points, and 75 penalty minutes in 71 games. In his freshman season, he led all first-year players on the team with 21 points as he helped the Engineers qualify for the ECAC Hockey Quarterfinals.

On March 14, 2014, the Vancouver Canucks of the NHL signed Zalewski as a free agent to an entry-level contract. On April 12, 2014, Zalewski made his NHL debut, skating 11:47 with the Vancouver Canucks in a 5–2 loss to the Edmonton Oilers.

On July 8, 2015, after failing to make the Canucks roster, he signed a one-year AHL contract with the Utica Comets, a Vancouver affiliate.

On January 20, 2016, Zalewski signed a two-way, one-year NHL contract with the Vancouver Canucks and was recalled the same day.

Zalewski left the Canucks' organization after three full seasons, signing a one-year deal with the Straubing Tigers of the Deutsche Eishockey Liga on July 17, 2017, joining his brother Steven who had played for Straubing the previous two years. In the 2017–18 season, Zalewski tallied 14 goals and 31 points in 51 games.

With the conclusion of his contract with Straubing, Zalewski signed a one-year deal with Kölner Haie on July 5, 2018.

On August 22, 2019, Zalewski moved to the neighboring Austrian Hockey League, agreeing to a one-year contract with the Vienna Capitals. In his lone season in the EBEL, Zalewski registered 15 goals and 33 points through 46 regular season games. He recorded 2 assists in 3 playoff games before the post-season was cancelled due to the COVID-19 pandemic.

As a free agent approaching the 2020–21 season, Zalewski returned to his previous club, Kölner Haie, on a one-year contract on December 11, 2020.

== Personal life ==
Zalewski has two brothers who play professional hockey as well, Steven, formerly with New Jersey and San Jose of the NHL; and Rich, of the Southern Hockey League. One of his sisters, Annika, played Division I women’s college hockey for Colgate.

Michael now works as a sales representative for Redwood Software.

== Career statistics ==
| | | | Regular season | | | | | Playoffs |
| Season | Team | League | GP | G | A | Pts | PIM | GP | G | A | Pts | PIM |
|---|---|---|---|---|---|---|---|---|---|---|---|---|
| 2005–06 | New Hartford High | USHS | 3 | 0 | 1 | 1 | — | — | — | — | — | — |
| 2006–07 | New Hartford High | USHS | 23 | 7 | 8 | 15 | — | — | — | — | — | — |
| 2007–08 | New Hartford High | USHS | 24 | 23 | 27 | 50 | — | — | — | — | — | — |
| 2008–09 | New Hartford High | USHS | 23 | 36 | 30 | 66 | — | — | — | — | — | — |
| 2009–10 | Syracuse Stars | EJHL | 43 | 16 | 32 | 48 | 28 | 2 | 0 | 1 | 1 | 4 |
| 2010–11 | Vernon Vipers | BCHL | 46 | 12 | 17 | 29 | 34 | 16 | 5 | 3 | 8 | 4 |
| 2011–12 | Vernon Vipers | BCHL | 60 | 38 | 37 | 75 | 83 | — | — | — | — | — |
| 2012–13 | R.P.I. | ECAC | 36 | 12 | 9 | 21 | 22 | — | — | — | — | — |
| 2013–14 | R.P.I. | ECAC | 35 | 9 | 17 | 26 | 53 | — | — | — | — | — |
| 2013–14 | Vancouver Canucks | NHL | 2 | 0 | 1 | 1 | 0 | — | — | — | — | — |
| 2014–15 | Utica Comets | AHL | 55 | 3 | 9 | 12 | 18 | 23 | 1 | 2 | 3 | 14 |
| 2015–16 | Utica Comets | AHL | 58 | 16 | 17 | 33 | 46 | 4 | 0 | 1 | 1 | 2 |
| 2015–16 | Vancouver Canucks | NHL | 3 | 0 | 1 | 1 | 2 | — | — | — | — | — |
| 2016–17 | Utica Comets | AHL | 54 | 5 | 13 | 18 | 36 | — | — | — | — | — |
| 2016–17 | Vancouver Canucks | NHL | 1 | 0 | 0 | 0 | 0 | — | — | — | — | — |
| 2017–18 | Straubing Tigers | DEL | 51 | 14 | 17 | 31 | 30 | — | — | — | — | — |
| 2018–19 | Kölner Haie | DEL | 44 | 5 | 13 | 18 | 30 | 11 | 1 | 2 | 3 | 10 |
| 2019–20 | Vienna Capitals | EBEL | 46 | 15 | 18 | 33 | 16 | 3 | 0 | 2 | 2 | 2 |
| 2020–21 | Kölner Haie | DEL | 38 | 3 | 9 | 12 | 18 | — | — | — | — | — |
| 2021–22 | Graz99ers | ICEHL | 39 | 10 | 11 | 21 | 26 | 2 | 2 | 1 | 3 | 2 |
| 2022–23 | Graz99ers | ICEHL | 10 | 1 | 1 | 2 | 4 | — | — | — | — | — |
| NHL totals | | | 6 | 0 | 2 | 2 | 2 | — | — | — | — | — |

== Awards and honors ==
| Award | Year |
|---|---|
| New York High School Player of the Year | 2008–09 |
| BCHL Champion | 2010–11 |
| CJHL Doyle Cup Champion | 2010–11 |
| RBC Cup Champion | 2010–11 |
