= New Hartford, New York =

- Town
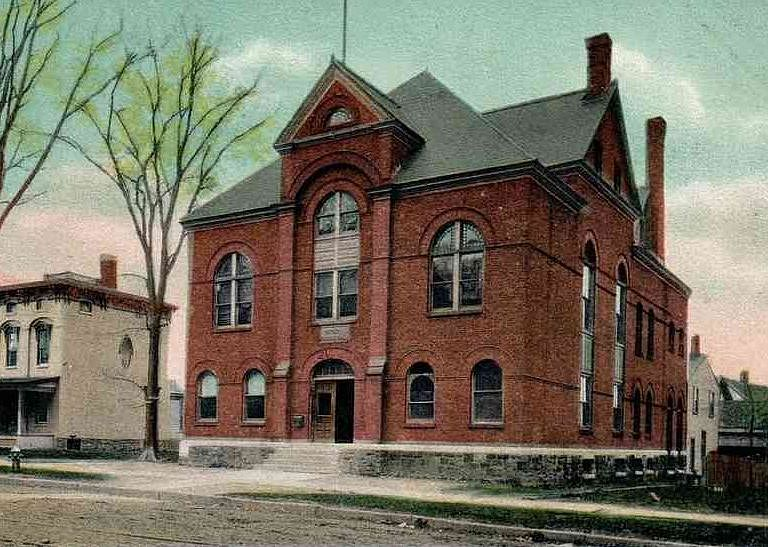
- Butler Hall was built in 1890. The historic building houses the Village of New Hartford municipal offices.

- Location in Oneida County and the state of New York.

- Location of New York in the United States
- Coordinates: 43°4′9″N 75°17′18″W
- Country: United States
- State: New York
- County: Oneida

Government
  - Town Supervisor: Paul Miscione Town Board: Deputy Supervisor Matthew Bohn; Ward 1: James Messa; Ward 2: Richard Lenart; Ward 3: David Reynolds; Ward 4: Rich Woodland

Area
  - Total: 25.53 sq mi (66.13 km^{2})
  - Land: 25.41 sq mi (65.82 km^{2})
  - Water: 0.12 sq mi (0.31 km^{2})

Population (2020)
  - Total: 21,874
  - Density: 860.7/sq mi (332.31/km^{2})
- Time zone: EST
  - Summer (DST): EDT
- ZIP Codes: 13413 (New Hartford); 13319 (Chadwicks); 13417 (New York Mills); 13321 (Clark Mills); 13323 (Clinton); 13456 (Sauquoit); 13501, 13502 (Utica)
- FIPS code: 36-065-50309
- Website: www.townofnewhartfordny.gov

New Hartford is a town in Oneida County, New York, United States. As of the 2020 census, the town population was 21,874. The name of New Hartford was provided by a settler family from Hartford, Connecticut.

The Town of New Hartford contains a village of New Hartford. The town of New Hartford is the largest suburb of Utica, which is located 5 miles northeast of the town and village.

== History ==
New Hartford was settled in March 1788 when Jedediah Sanger, who was bankrupted in 1784 by a fire at his farm in Jaffrey, New Hampshire and afterwards moved to the area.

=== Sanger land purchase ===
==== Common history ====
According to the earliest recorded history (Annals and Recollections of Oneida County, Jones, 1851), Sanger bought 1,000 acres (400 ha), the land was sold at a price of fifty cents an acre. This land, thought to be separated into two equal parts by the Sauquoit Creek, was part of the Town of Whitestown at the time. Within a year, Sanger sold the area east of the creek to Joseph Higbee, the area's second resident, for one dollar per acre. A subsequent survey found this area was 600 acres (240 ha).

==== Possible inaccuracy ====
This narrative of a 1000-acre purchase by Sanger for $500 and the ensuing resale to Higbee of half the land for $500 (a 100% profit) is repeated in The History of Oneida County, New York by Samuel W. Durant, 1878 which used the Jones' Annals of 1851 as a primary reference. The story was expressed in an address at the 1888 New Hartford Centennial by Henry Hurlburt, again citing Jones' Annals as his source. It is again repeated in Our County and Its People: A Descriptive Work on Oneida County, New York, Wager, 1896.

However, a footnote in Transactions of the Oneida Historical Society at Utica, New Hartford Centennial, 1889, which documented the 1888 centennial, questions the validity of the story through research of property deed records. The footnote cites one deed for the sale of four 492 acre lots from John G. Leake to Sanger in November 1790 for approximately $1.16 per acre (US dollars were not the currency in use at the time), and another deed shows the sale of one of the four lots to Higbee in December 1791 for approximately $1.06 per acre. Also listed is a deed conveying 234 acres (95 ha) to Sanger from George Washington and George Clinton for $1.27 per acre in 1790. From the recorded deeds, the land Sanger sold to Hibgee was sold for slightly less than the price originally paid by Sanger.

In spite of the research done in 1889, the original story is popularly told. This version can be found at the Town of New Hartford website and is attributed to the New Hartford Historical Society:

"Sanger traveled to Philadelphia and purchased 1,000 acres (400 ha) of land at $.50 per acre on credit from George Washington and George Clinton. The following year he shrewdly sold a little over half the land on the east side of the Sauquoit Creek to Joseph Higbee (Higby) at $1.00 per acre."

=== Other land ===
Present-day New Hartford covers over 16,000 acres (6,500 ha) in area, considerably more than that contained in Sanger's original purchases. Sanger's purchase had been part of the Coxe Patent, land purchased directly from the colonial government of New York.

Other portions of New Hartford is made up of land from the following Patents:

- Cosby's Manor, 22,000 acres (8,900 ha) deeded on January 2, 1734, to Joseph Worrell and 10 others.
- Sadaqueda (Sauquoit) Patent, 48,000 acres (19,000 ha) deeded on June 25, 1736, to Fredrick Morris, Lendert Gasenvoort and others.
- Coxe Patent, 76,000 acres (31,000 ha) deeded on May 30, 1770, to William Coxe, Daniel Coxe, Rebecca Coxe, John Tabor Kempe and his wife Grace (Coxe). Daniel, William, and Rebecca were the children of Daniel Coxe, Jr. and grandchildren of Daniel Coxe. Kempe was Attorney General of New York at the time and remained loyal to England during the Revolution. As a loyalist, his property was confiscated after the war and the Coxe patent was divided with General George Washington, General DeWitt Clinton, and Colonel Marinus Willett owning large parts of the patent.
- Bayard Patent, 50,000 acres (20,000 ha) deeded on June 12, 1771, to William Bayard, Alexander Ellis, and fifty-three others

=== Early settlers ===
In 1789, Sanger relocated his family to the settlement and erected a sawmill. A gristmill was added in 1790. Both mills utilized the water of the Sauquoit for power.

Another early settler was General Oliver Collins (1762–1838), Connecticut native, Revolutionary War veteran and father of future Congressman Ela Collins. Collins settled a farm in the area then known as Middle Settlement in 1789 and resided there until his death. Shortly after arriving, he was commissioned Captain in the local militia and rose to the rank of Brigadier-general at the time of the War of 1812. Eli Butler arrived from Middletown, Connecticut, also in 1789.

John French (1766–1839) arrived from New Hampshire in 1792 and settled another farm, as did Colonel Nathan Seward (1758–1815) of Connecticut, also a Revolutionary War veteran.

Other settlers included Nathan Seward, Ashbel Beach, Amos Ives, Solomon Blodget, Salmon Butler, Joel Blair, Agift Hill, Stephen Bushnell, Joseph Jennings.

Captain David Risley, Revolutionary War veteran and brother Allen Risley, and Truman and Webster Kellogg settled in the area that is now the hamlet of Washington Mills.

There were two families named Olmstead, and a Seymour, Hurlburt, Kilborn, and Montague. More settlers from Connecticut were Henry Blackstone, Zenas Gibbs, Ashbel Tylor, and Nehemiah Ensworth (from Canterbury), all arriving in 1791. The first child born to the settlers was Uriel H. Kellogg.

=== Civic formation ===
Thirty-nine years after Sanger arrived, the Town of New Hartford was created on April 12, 1827, formed from the Town of Whitestown. Whitestown originally contained all of New York state west of Herkimer, and was subsequently split into many counties and towns with New Hartford being the last. The legislative act was entitled "An Act to Divide the Town of Whitestown, in the County of Oneida." The early settlers had adopted the name New Hartford for the settlement, and the name was retained for the town.

The first town meeting was held on April 24, 1827, and the following positions were filled: town supervisor, town clerk, assessors (3), commissioner of highways (3), overseers of the poor (2), collector, commissioners of common schools (3), inspectors of schools (3).

Seven years later, the town was enlarged, with a piece of the Town of Kirkland by legislative act on April 26, 1834.

The legislature passed an act on November 22, 1855, transferring a small part of New Hartford, Westmoreland, and Whitestown to Kirkland, enabling the hamlet of Clark Mills to be contained entirely within Kirkland instead of being partly within four different towns.

=== Village of New Hartford ===
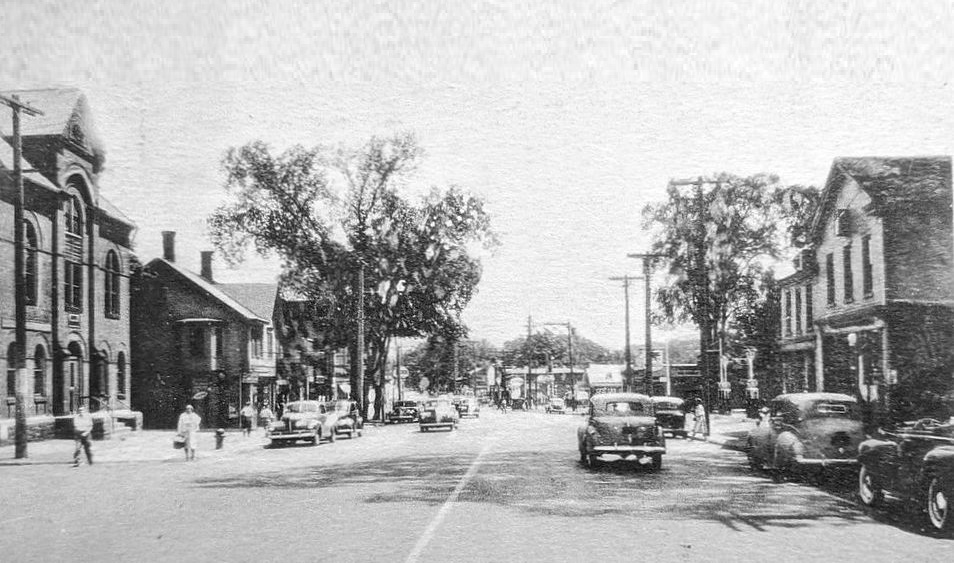
Village of New Hartford 1940 Genesee Street looking east, with Butler Hall at left

Many manufacturing ventures started in New Hartford after its settlement and throughout the 19th century.

The Village of New Hartford was incorporated in 1870, from approximately 406 acres (164 ha) of the town by a vote of 32 to 9. On December 21, 1871, the area of the village east of the Sauquoit Creek was reverted to the town.

=== Early manufacturing and commerce ===
- Carpets: Ingrain carpets were made on the first ingrain loom in the state by an Englishman named Butterfield. Ingrain carpets are a reversible, flat weave carpet popular from the 18th century to the early 20th century. This form of carpeting has no pile and the pattern is shown in opposing colors on both faces, making it possible to turn the carpet over when one side was worn or soiled.
- Nails: The first cut nails made in the state were produced by Jonathan Richardson, who purchased wine and liquor casks and made cut nails from the iron hoops of the casks.
- Tanneries were established by Thomas and Ezekiel Williams, and another by Stephen Childs.
- Paper and textiles: Factories were established for the production of paper, batting, cotton cloth, and knitted fabric.

The earliest manufacturing operations were concentrated along the Sauquoit Creek and utilized water as the primary power source. The power of the creek was the reason that New Hartford had such extensive manufacturing operations for a town of its size. Business in New Hartford exceeded that of Utica due to the water power of the creek. Most factories later transitioned to steam power.

Another boon to the economy of New Hartford was the Seneca Turnpike, a toll road connecting Utica to the western part of the state. The Seneca Road Company was formed in 1800 to improve the main road running west from Utica, NY and operate it as a toll road or turnpike. The original road ran north of New Hartford, but Jedediah Sanger purchased stock in the company and through his influence, the turnpike was routed through New Hartford. The turnpike traffic made New Hartford prosper, outstripping other towns in the area and rivaling neighboring Utica until the Erie Canal was constructed through Utica, removing most cross-state traffic from New Hartford. Utica then grew into a large city and New Hartford continues to this day to be a suburb.

== Education ==
Most of New Hartford is within the New Hartford Central School District. Portions of the town are in Clinton Central School District and Sauquoit Valley Central School District.

Schools in the New Hartford district include:

Elementary schools

- Bradley Elementary School
- E.R. Hughes Elementary School
- Robert E. Myles Elementary School

Secondary schools

- Ralph W. Perry Junior High School
- New Hartford Senior High School

== Geography ==
According to the United States Census Bureau, the town has a total area of 25.5 square miles (66 km^{2}), of which 25.4 square miles (66 km^{2}) is land and 0.1 square miles (0.3 km^{2}) (0.46%) is water.

The eastern town line is formed by the boundaries of the towns of Litchfield and Frankfort in Herkimer County.

=== Historic places ===
The following is listed on the National Register of Historic Places:

- St. Stephen's Church

== Demographics ==
Historical population
Census	Pop.	Note	%±
1830	3,599		—
1840	3,819		6.1%
1850	4,847		26.9%
1860	4,395		−9.3%
1870	4,037		−8.1%
1880	4,394		8.8%
1890	5,005		13.9%
1900	5,230		4.5%
1910	5,947		13.7%
1920	8,646		45.4%
1930	7,121		−17.6%
1940	8,109		13.9%
1950	11,071		36.5%
1960	18,444		66.6%
1970	21,430		16.2%
1980	21,286		−0.7%
1990	21,640		1.7%
2000	21,172		−2.2%
2010	22,166		4.7%
2020	21,874		−1.3%
U.S. Decennial Census

As of the census of 2000, there were 21,172 people, 8,601 households, and 5,625 families residing in the town. The population density was 834.1 people per square mile (322.1/km^{2}. There were 9,084 housing units at an average density of 357.9 per square mile 138.2/km^{2}. The racial makeup of the town was 96.03% White, 0.80% Black or African American, 0.10% Native American, 2.34% Asian, 0.01% Pacific Islander, 0.21% from other races, and 0.51% from two or more races. Hispanic or Latino of any race were 0.73% of the population.

There were 8,601 households, out of which 27.7% had children under the age of 18 living with them, 54.6% were married couples living together, 8.4% had a female householder with no husband present, and 34.6% were non-families. 30.6% of all households were made up of individuals, and 16.8% had someone living alone who was 65 years of age or older. The average household size was 2.34 and the average family size was 2.94.

In the town, the population was spread out, with 21.7% under the age of 18, 5.3% from 18 to 24, 23.6% from 25 to 44, 25.7% from 45 to 64, and 23.7% who were 65 years of age or older. The median age was 45 years. For every 100 females, there were 85.6 males. For every 100 females age 18 and over, there were 80.1 males.

The median income for a household in the town was $45,991, and the median income for a family was $60,843. Males had a median income of $40,046 versus $28,532 for females. The per capita income for the town was $26,528. About 3.4% of families and 5.0% of the population were below the poverty line, including 4.4% of those under age 18 and 6.5% of those age 65 or over.

42% of New Hartford residents ages 25 and older have a bachelor's or advanced college degree.

== Communities ==
- Chadwicks – A hamlet near the southern town line.
- New Hartford – A village in the eastern part of the town.
- Washington Mills – A hamlet south of New Hartford village on NY 8.
- New York Mills – A village north of New Hartford village approximately one-third within the town and the remainder within the town of Whitestown.

== Notable people ==
- Waleed Abdalati, raised in New Hartford, Class of 1982, served as NASA Chief Scientist and is Currently Director of the Cooperative Institute for Research in Environmental Sciences (CIRES) at the University of Colorado in Boulder.
- Derek Bard, professional golfer, currently on the PGA Tour Latinoamérica.
- Sydney Bard, professional ice hockey defenceman for the Seattle Torrent.
- Joe Bonamassa, (born May 8, 1977) is an American blues rock guitarist and singer.
- Joel de la Fuente, actor.
- Chuck Garvey and Al Schnier are guitarists in the jam band moe.
- Grace Lin, children’s book author.
- Frederick S. Martin, former US Congressman.
- Roswell B. Mason, Mayor of Chicago during the Great Chicago Fire of 1871.
- William John Murphy, born in 1839. Murphy is the founder of the city of Glendale, Arizona.
- Henry Palmer, born in 1827. Palmer was a surgeon in the Union Army during the Civil War.
- James Wilson Seaton, Wisconsin lawyer and legislator.
- Claudia Tenney, lawyer, publisher, commentator and politician.
- Maria Van Kerkhove, an infectious disease epidemiologist who is the technical lead of the COVID-19 response and the head of the emerging diseases and zoonosis unit at the World Health Organization (WHO).
- Andy Van Slyke, born December 21, 1960, in Utica) raised in New Hartford, is a retired Major League Baseball outfielder and former first base coach for the Detroit Tigers. He is currently the first base coach for the Seattle Mariners.
- William Williams, printer and publisher, elder of Presbyterian Church
- Mike Zalewski, professional hockey player in the NHL.
- Steven Zalewski, professional hockey player in the NHL.
