= Killing of Lucas Leonard =

2015 beating death at a church in upstate New York, US

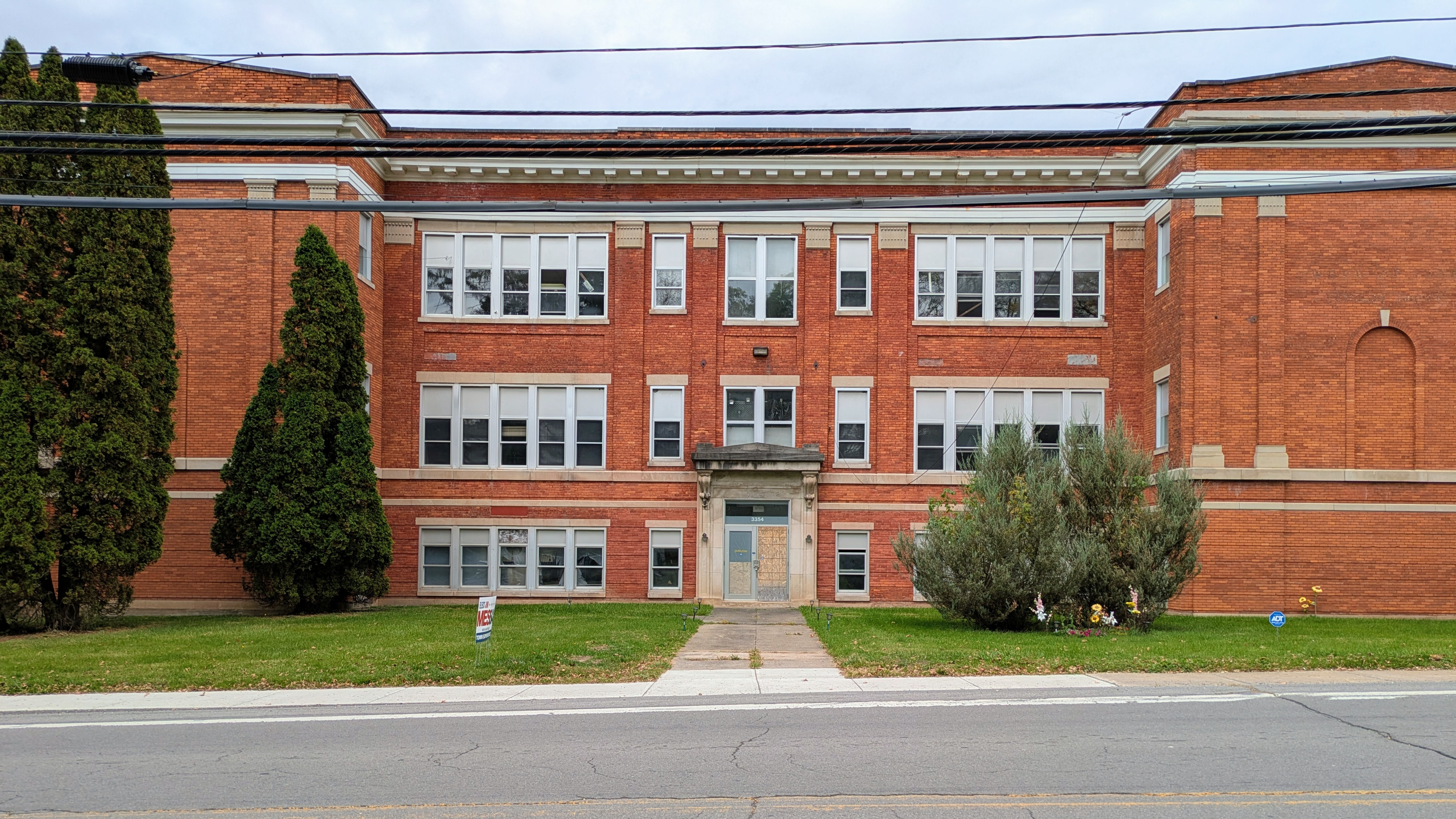
- The former Word of Life Church photographed in 2025

- Killing of Lucas Leonard (New York)
- Location: Word of Life Christian Church, Chadwicks, New York
- Date: October 11, 2015– October 12, 2015
- Target: The Leonard brothers
- Deaths: 1 (Lucas Leonard)
- Injuries: 1 (Christopher Leonard)
- Assailants: Word of Life congregants, including family of Leonard
- Charges: Manslaughter, assault, unlawful imprisonment
- Convictions: 9

In October 2015, 19-year-old Lucas Leonard died from injuries sustained during repeated and severe beatings at the Word of Life Christian Church in Chadwicks, New York. The beatings were part of "spiritual counseling" for Lucas and his 17-year old brother Christopher, who survived with severe injuries. The two were repeatedly assaulted by a group of parishioners, which included church leaders and the Leonard brothers' parents and older sister.

== Background ==
The Word of Life Christian Church was based in a former school in Chadwicks. Starting out as an ordinary Pentecostal church, it became more cult-like after pastor Jerry Irwin began manipulating other members. An uncle of the Leonard children said that after he decided not to join the church in the 1990s, church leadership forbade the children from having contact with him. After Jerry Irwin died, his daughter, Tiffanie Irwin, assumed the primary leadership role.

Tiffanie Irwin accused Lucas of having been involved in witchcraft and voodoo, but the police said there was no evidence supporting that accusation. Authorities have stated that the torture was prompted by Lucas' desire to leave the church.

== Incident ==
On the night of October 11, 2015, following a Sunday church meeting, Lucas Leonard was subject to an all-night church counseling session, led by Tiffanie Irwin and attended by about 30 parishioners, including Leonard's parents and older sister. The meeting was held after Leonard expressed a desire to leave the church. Lucas and his 17-year-old brother, Christopher, were beaten continuously. According to witness testimony, the session lasted 14 hours and ended when the parishioners thought Lucas was dead. Lucas died in hospital the next day. Autopsy results revealed "multiple contusions from blunt-force trauma to the torso and extremities", including blows to the genital area.

== Indictments and investigation ==
A grand jury handed down indictments to Leonard's parents, Bruce and Deborah Leonard, for first-degree manslaughter; it also indicted four other church members, including Leonard's older sister, Sarah Ferguson. Animals subsequently rescued from Lucas' parents' house were found to have been living in neglect, and the house was foul-smelling and full of garbage.

Neighbors described the church as isolated from the local community and as a cult, with one saying that "church members used to build fires on the roofs, and there was chanting and weird rituals", and that dogs howled all night inside the church but were never seen outside. Cult expert Rick Alan Ross said "This is an old-school group...It’s typical in many ways. They’re very isolated, they've cocooned their members and homeschooled the children. Besides a web site to sell pedigree Yorkshire Terriers, they were very isolated. That’s a common characteristic in cults to make sure they are the only ones influencing the member’s judgements." A former member said that parents were routinely encouraged to beat their children as punishment for getting bad grades.

Following the incident, the pastor of the unrelated Word Of Life Assembly of God Church in Baldwinsville, New York, began receiving threatening phone calls from people confusing his church with the one in Chadwicks. The Chadwicks church, despite being Pentecostal, is not affiliated with Assembly of God or any other denomination, and is not overseen by any larger organization.

The townspeople held a prayer vigil outside the church on October 20. The organizers of the prayer vigil also called for Word of Life to be shut down.

== Legal proceedings ==
Lucas's surviving brother, Christopher Leonard, began testifying in court starting on October 21. He said that during the beating, he was punched in the stomach, then struck on the genitals and other parts of his body with a 4 feet (1.2 m) "whip" made from an electrical cord. Later on, he was forced to wear ear plugs and ear muffs, and to sit in a corner. He said the church's pastor, Tiffanie Irwin, was responsible for organizing the counseling session during which the beating took place. When he saw his brother lying motionless on the floor, Christopher attempted to give him CPR but stopped once he realized Lucas was dead.

On October 23, a family court hearing was held to determine who should have custody of the Leonards' seven other underage children, aged between 2 and 15.

== Convictions ==
Bruce Leonard, the father, who whipped both boys during the session pleaded guilty to felony assault was sentenced to 10 years in state prison. He was paroled in 2024.

Deborah Leonard, the mother, who whipped them during the session pleaded guilty to felony assault, and was sentenced to five years in state prison. She was paroled in 2020 and left the state.

On September 1, 2016 half sister Sarah Ferguson was sentenced to 25 years in prison after being convicted in July 2016 of manslaughter and assault.

Pastor Tiffanie Irwin, age 29, who called for the so-called counseling session and oversaw its organization was sentenced on December 19, 2016 to 12 years in state prison for manslaughter. She was paroled in September 2025.

Joseph Irwin was sentenced on December 19 to eight years in prison for gang assault. He was paroled in 2022 and left the state.

David Morey was sentenced on January 9, 2017 to five years in prison for assault. He was released in 2020.

Linda Morey who pulled the power cord out of the closet was sentenced on January 9 to five years in prison for assault. She was released in 2020.

Traci Irwin, 50, and Daniel Irwin, 25, both pleaded guilty to unlawful imprisonment. Traci was sentenced to one year for each count, and Daniel received two years in jail. Both were set free on March 24, 2017 after serving one year and five months.
