= List of New Jersey Devils seasons =

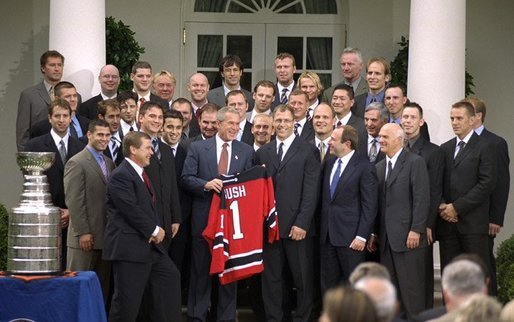
The 2003 Stanley Cup champion Devils present a jersey to U.S. President George W. Bush.

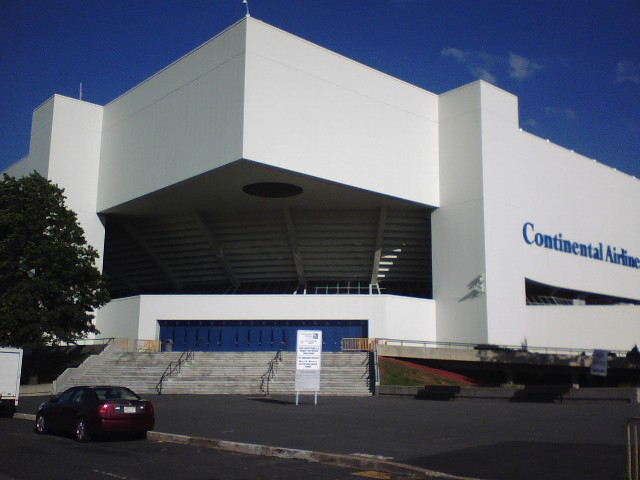
The Meadowlands Arena, where the Devils played from 1982 to 2007

The New Jersey Devils are a professional ice hockey team based in Newark, New Jersey. The team is a member of the Metropolitan Division of the Eastern Conference of the National Hockey League (NHL). The Devils arrived in New Jersey in 1982 after transferring from Denver, where they had been known as the Colorado Rockies since 1976. Before that, the franchise entered the league as the Kansas City Scouts in 1974. The 2021–22 season is the 39th season of play in New Jersey. It is the 47th year for the Devils franchise, and including the team's time in Kansas City and Denver, the Devils have won over 1,500 regular season games, 17th overall in NHL history.

New Jersey played its first 11 seasons in the Patrick Division before moving to the Atlantic Division when the NHL renamed divisions in 1993. The Devils first qualified for the playoffs in 1988, eventually losing in the conference finals. The team then made the playoffs several times after that before capturing their first Stanley Cup in the lockout-shortened 1994–95 season. The following year, the Devils missed the playoffs, becoming the first team in 26 years to fail to qualify for the playoffs the season after a Stanley Cup victory. Since 1997, however, the Devils qualified for the playoffs each season until 2010–11, a streak surpassed only by the Detroit Red Wings. The Devils won the Stanley Cup in 2000 and 2003, and advanced to the Finals in 2001, only to lose to the Colorado Avalanche in seven games. Overall, the Devils made 22 appearances in the Stanley Cup playoffs, in the 24 seasons between 1987–88 and 2011–12, including 13 consecutive seasons between 1996–97 and 2009–10. After missing the playoffs for the first time in 14 years in 2010–11, the Devils rebounded the following year, making the playoffs again and losing in the Stanley Cup Final to the Los Angeles Kings. Following this run the Devils had trouble finding success as they missed the playoffs nine times in the following ten seasons.

== Table key ==
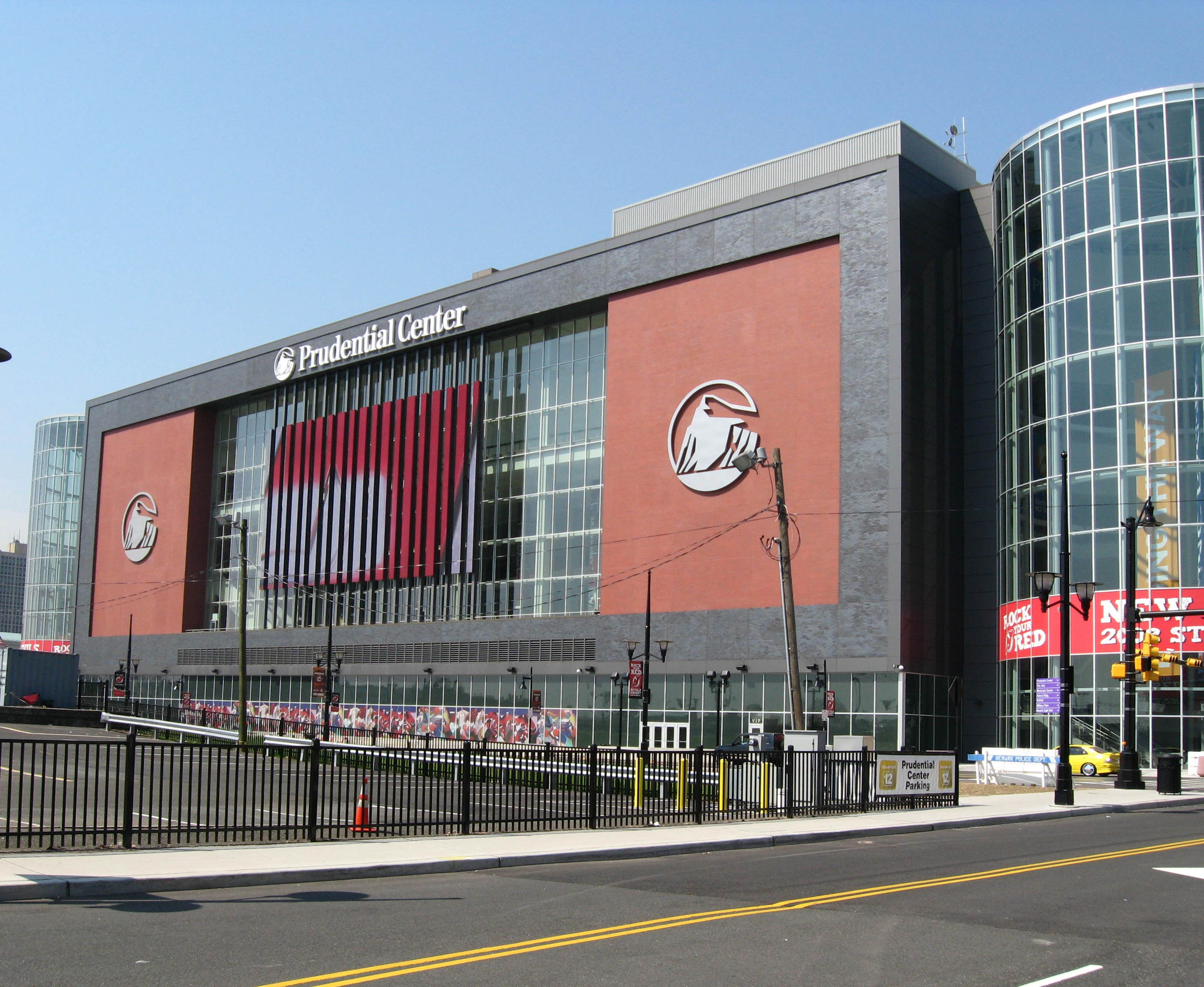
The Prudential Center, the Devils' home arena since the 2007 season

Key of colors and symbols
Color/symbol	Explanation
†	Stanley Cup champions
‡	Conference champions
↑	Division champions

Key of terms and abbreviations
Term or abbreviation	Definition
Finish	Final position in division or league standings
GP	Number of games played
W	Number of wins
L	Number of losses
T	Number of ties
OT	Number of losses in overtime (since the 1999–2000 season)
Pts	Number of points
GF	Goals for (goals scored by the Devils)
GA	Goals against (goals scored by the Devils' opponents)
—	Does not apply

== Year by year ==
NHL season	Devils season	Conference	Division	Regular season									Postseason					
NHL season	Devils season	Conference	Division	Finish	GP	W	L	T	OT	Pts	GF	GA	GP	W	L	GF	GA	Result
Relocated from Colorado
1982–83	1982–83	Wales	Patrick	5th	80	17	49	14	—	48	230	338	—	—	—	—	—	Did not qualify
1983–84	1983–84	Wales	Patrick	5th	80	17	56	7	—	41	231	350	—	—	—	—	—	Did not qualify
1984–85	1984–85	Wales	Patrick	5th	80	22	48	10	—	54	264	346	—	—	—	—	—	Did not qualify
1985–86	1985–86	Wales	Patrick	6th	80	28	49	3	—	59	300	374	—	—	—	—	—	Did not qualify
1986–87	1986–87	Wales	Patrick	6th	80	29	45	6	—	64	293	368	—	—	—	—	—	Did not qualify
1987–88	1987–88	Wales	Patrick	4th	80	38	36	6	—	82	295	296	20	11	9	67	71	Won in division semifinals vs. New York Islanders, 4–2; Won in division finals vs. Washington Capitals, 4–3; Lost in conference finals vs. Boston Bruins, 3–4
1988–89	1988–89	Wales	Patrick	5th	80	27	41	12	—	66	281	325	—	—	—	—	—	Did not qualify
1989–90	1989–90	Wales	Patrick	2nd	80	37	34	9	—	83	295	288	6	2	4	18	21	Lost in division semifinals vs. Washington Capitals, 2–4
1990–91	1990–91	Wales	Patrick	4th	80	32	33	15	—	79	272	264	7	3	4	21	21	Lost in division semifinals vs. Pittsburgh Penguins, 3–4
1991–92	1991–92	Wales	Patrick	4th	80	38	31	11	—	87	289	259	7	3	4	25	28	Lost in division semifinals vs. New York Rangers, 3–4
1992–93 (Note: In 1992, the NHL expanded the season to 84 games, and each team played two games at a neutral site. After the 1995 lockout, the neutral site games were eliminated, and the season was reduced to 82 games.)	1992–93	Wales	Patrick	4th	84	40	37	7	—	87	308	299	5	1	4	13	23	Lost in division semifinals vs. Pittsburgh Penguins, 1–4
1993–94	1993–94	Eastern (Note: The NHL realigned into Eastern and Western Conferences prior to the 1993–94 season. New Jersey was placed in the Atlantic Division of the Eastern Conference.)	Atlantic	2nd	84	47	25	12	—	106	306	220	20	11	9	52	49	Won in conference quarterfinals vs. Buffalo Sabres, 4–3; Won in conference semifinals vs. Boston Bruins, 4–2; Lost in conference finals vs. New York Rangers, 3–4
1994–95 (Note: Both seasons were shortened to 48 games because of lockouts – the 1994–95 NHL lockout ended on January 11, 1995, and the 2012–13 NHL lockout ended on January 6, 2013.)	1994–95 †	Eastern	Atlantic	2nd	48	22	18	8	—	52	136	121	20	16	4	67	34	Won in conference quarterfinals vs. Boston Bruins, 4–1; Won in conference semifinals vs. Pittsburgh Penguins, 4–1; Won in conference finals vs. Philadelphia Flyers, 4–2; Won in Stanley Cup Final vs. Detroit Red Wings, 4–0 †
1995–96	1995–96	Eastern	Atlantic	6th	82	37	33	12	—	86	215	202	—	—	—	—	—	Did not qualify
1996–97	1996–97	Eastern	Atlantic ↑	1st	82	45	23	14	—	104	231	182	10	5	5	27	21	Won in conference quarterfinals vs. Montreal Canadiens, 4–1; Lost in conference semifinals vs. New York Rangers, 1–4
1997–98	1997–98	Eastern	Atlantic ↑	1st	82	48	23	11	—	107	225	166	6	2	4	12	13	Lost in conference quarterfinals vs. Ottawa Senators, 2–4
1998–99	1998–99	Eastern	Atlantic ↑	1st	82	47	24	11	—	105	248	196	7	3	4	18	21	Lost in conference quarterfinals vs. Pittsburgh Penguins, 3–4
1999–2000	1999–2000 †	Eastern	Atlantic	2nd	82	45	24	8	5 (Note: Beginning with the 1999–2000 season, teams received one point for losing a regular season game in overtime.)	103	251	203	23	16	7	61	39	Won in conference quarterfinals vs. Florida Panthers, 4–0; Won in conference semifinals vs. Toronto Maple Leafs, 4–2; Won in conference finals vs. Philadelphia Flyers, 4–3; Won in Stanley Cup Final vs. Dallas Stars, 4–2 †
2000–01	2000–01	Eastern	Atlantic ↑	1st	82	48	19	12	3	111	295	195	25	15	10	69	52	Won in conference quarterfinals vs. Carolina Hurricanes, 4–2; Won in conference semifinals vs. Toronto Maple Leafs, 4–3; Won in conference finals vs. Pittsburgh Penguins, 4–1; Lost in Stanley Cup Final vs. Colorado Avalanche, 3–4 ‡
2001–02	2001–02	Eastern	Atlantic	3rd	82	41	28	9	4	95	205	187	6	2	4	11	9	Lost in conference quarterfinals vs. Carolina Hurricanes, 2–4
2002–03	2002–03 †	Eastern	Atlantic ↑	1st	82	46	20	10	6	108	216	166	24	16	8	63	41	Won in conference quarterfinals vs. Boston Bruins, 4–1; Won in conference semifinals vs. Tampa Bay Lightning, 4–1; Won in conference finals vs. Ottawa Senators, 4–3; Won in Stanley Cup Final vs. Mighty Ducks of Anaheim, 4–3 †
2003–04	2003–04	Eastern	Atlantic	2nd	82	43	25	12	2	100	213	164	5	1	4	9	14	Lost in conference quarterfinals vs. Philadelphia Flyers, 1–4
2004–05 (Note: The season was canceled because of the 2004–05 NHL lockout.)	2004–05	Eastern	Atlantic	Season not played due to lockout														
2005–06	2005–06	Eastern	Atlantic ↑	1st	82	46	27	—	9 (Note: Beginning with the 2005–06 season, the NHL instituted a penalty shootout for regular season games that remained tied after a five-minute overtime period, which prevented ties.)	101	242	229	9	5	4	27	21	Won in conference quarterfinals vs. New York Rangers, 4–0; Lost in conference semifinals vs. Carolina Hurricanes, 1–4
2006–07	2006–07	Eastern	Atlantic ↑	1st	82	49	24	—	9	107	216	201	11	5	6	30	29	Won in conference quarterfinals vs. Tampa Bay Lightning, 4–2; Lost in conference semifinals vs. Ottawa Senators, 1–4
2007–08	2007–08	Eastern	Atlantic	2nd	82	46	29	—	7	99	206	197	5	1	4	12	19	Lost in conference quarterfinals vs. New York Rangers, 1–4
2008–09	2008–09	Eastern	Atlantic ↑	1st	82	51	27	—	4	106	244	209	7	3	4	15	17	Lost in conference quarterfinals vs. Carolina Hurricanes, 3–4
2009–10	2009–10	Eastern	Atlantic ↑	1st	82	48	27	—	7	103	216	186	5	1	4	9	15	Lost in conference quarterfinals vs. Philadelphia Flyers, 1–4
2010–11	2010–11	Eastern	Atlantic	4th	82	38	39	—	5	81	174	209	—	—	—	—	—	Did not qualify
2011–12	2011–12	Eastern	Atlantic	4th	82	48	28	—	6	102	228	202	24	14	10	59	58	Won in conference quarterfinals vs. Florida Panthers, 4–3; Won in conference semifinals vs. Philadelphia Flyers, 4–1; Won in conference finals vs. New York Rangers, 4–2; Lost in Stanley Cup Final vs. Los Angeles Kings, 2–4 ‡
2012–13	2012–13	Eastern	Atlantic	5th	48	19	19	—	10	48	112	129	—	—	—	—	—	Did not qualify
2013–14	2013–14	Eastern	Metropolitan	6th	82	35	29	—	18	88	197	208	—	—	—	—	—	Did not qualify
2014–15	2014–15	Eastern	Metropolitan	7th	82	32	36	—	14	78	181	216	—	—	—	—	—	Did not qualify
2015–16	2015–16	Eastern	Metropolitan	7th	82	38	36	—	8	84	184	208	—	—	—	—	—	Did not qualify
2016–17	2016–17	Eastern	Metropolitan	8th	82	28	40	—	14	70	183	244	—	—	—	—	—	Did not qualify
2017–18	2017–18	Eastern	Metropolitan	5th	82	44	29	—	9	97	248	244	5	1	4	12	18	Lost in first round vs. Tampa Bay Lightning, 1–4
2018–19	2018–19	Eastern	Metropolitan	8th	82	31	41	—	10	72	222	275	—	—	—	—	—	Did not qualify
2019–20 (Note: The 2019–20 regular season officially ended in May due to the COVID-19 pandemic, with the remaining regular season games from March and April being cancelled.)	2019–20	Eastern	Metropolitan	8th	69	28	29	—	12	68	189	230	—	—	—	—	—	Did not qualify
2020–21 (Note: Due to the COVID-19 pandemic, the 2020–21 NHL season was shortened to 56 games.)	2020–21	—	East	7th	56	19	30	—	7	45	145	194	—	—	—	—	—	Did not qualify
2021–22	2021–22	Eastern	Metropolitan	7th	82	27	46	—	9	63	248	307	—	—	—	—	—	Did not qualify
2022–23	2022–23	Eastern	Metropolitan	2nd	82	52	22	—	8	112	291	226	12	5	7	30	41	Won in first round vs. New York Rangers, 4–3; Lost in second round vs. Carolina Hurricanes, 1–4
2023–24	2023–24	Eastern	Metropolitan	7th	82	38	39	—	5	81	264	283	—	—	—	—	—	Did not qualify
2024–25	2024–25	Eastern	Metropolitan	3rd	82	42	33	—	7	91	242	222	5	1	4	11	19	Lost in first round vs. Carolina Hurricanes, 1–4
2025–26	2025–26	Eastern	Metropolitan	7th	82	42	37	—	3	87	230	254	—	—	—	—	—	Did not qualify
Totals (Note: Totals as of the completion of the 2025–26 season.)					3,403	1,595	1,388	219	201	3,523	10,067	10,194	274	143	131	738	694	24 playoff appearances
