= Vladimir Zharkov =

Russian ice hockey player

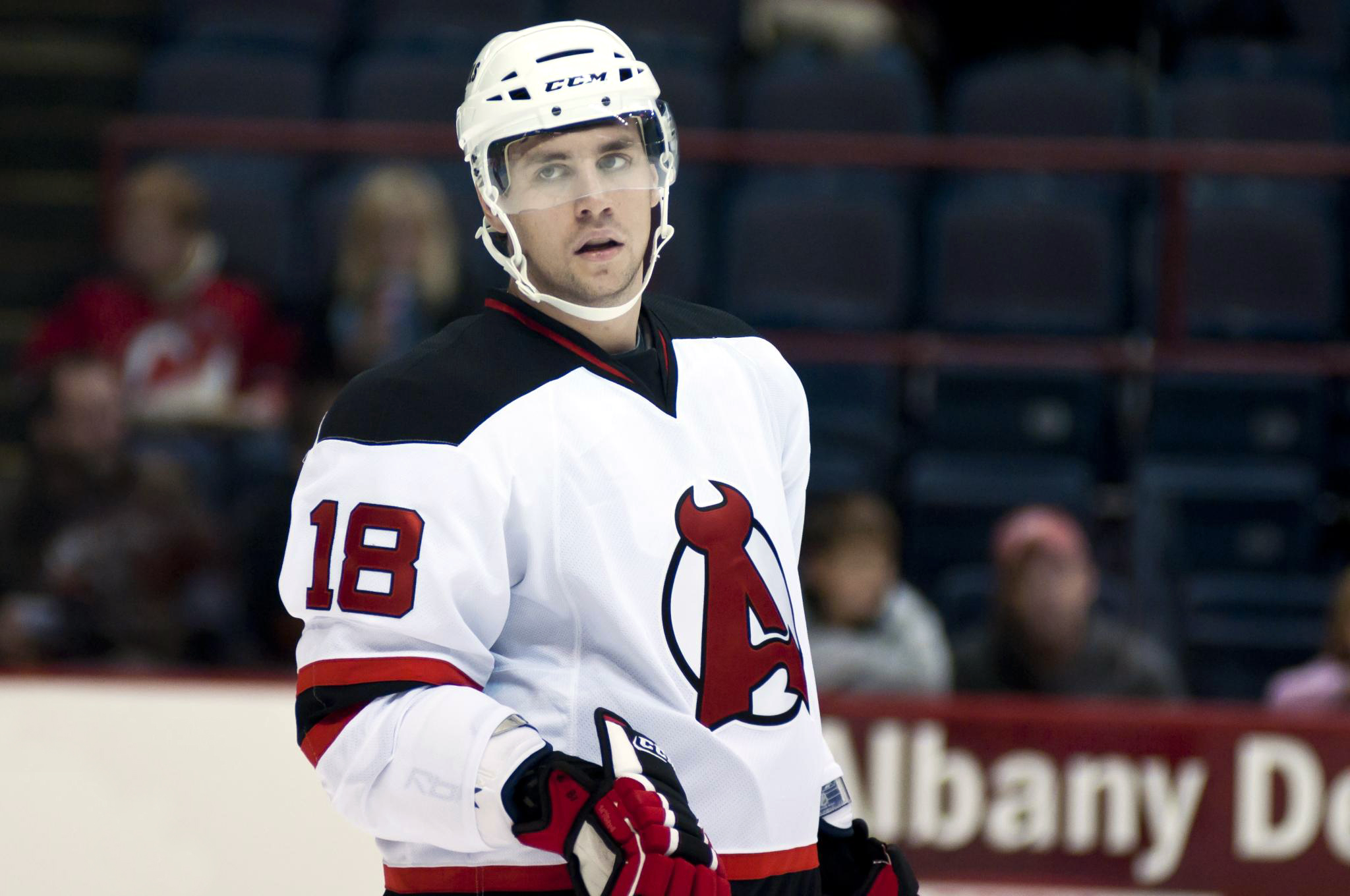
- Born: January 10, 1988 (age 38) Elektrostal, Soviet Union
- Height: 6 ft 0 in (183 cm)
- Weight: 187 lb (85 kg; 13 st 5 lb)
- Position: Right wing
- Shoots: Left
- KHL team Former teams: Traktor Chelyabinsk; New Jersey Devils; CSKA Moscow; Salavat Yulaev Ufa; Avangard Omsk
- NHL draft: 77th overall, 2006; New Jersey Devils
- Playing career: 2005–present

Vladimir Alexanderovich Zharkov (Russian: Влади́мир Алекса́ндрович Жарко́в; born January 10, 1988) is a Russian professional ice hockey right winger. He is currently playing with Traktor Chelyabinsk of the Kontinental Hockey League (KHL). He has formerly playing in the National Hockey League with the New Jersey Devils. Zharkov was selected by the Devils in the 3rd round (77th overall) of the 2006 NHL entry draft.

== Playing career ==
Zharkov played four seasons within the New Jersey Devils organization. He scored his first NHL goal in the 2010–11 season, on January 17, 2011, against Kevin Poulin of the New York Islanders.

On July 3, 2012, Zharkov opted to return to his native Russia in accepting a three-year contract for a second spell with original club, HC CSKA Moscow of the KHL.

After six further seasons with CSKA, Zharkov left for a second time as a free agent, in agreeing to a two-year contract with Salavat Yulaev Ufa on 1 May 2018.

Zharkov played three seasons with Salavat Yulaev, before signing as a free agent to a two-year contract with newly crowned champions, Avangard Omsk, on 1 May 2021.

Having concluded his contract with Avangard, Zharkov signed as a free agent to a two-year contract with his fourth KHL club, Traktor Chelyabinsk, on 30 June 2023.

== Career statistics ==
=== Regular season and playoffs ===
			Regular season					Playoffs
Season	Team	League	GP	G	A	Pts	PIM	GP	G	A	Pts	PIM
2004–05	CSKA–2 Moscow	RUS.3	35	7	0	7	8	—	—	—	—	—
2005–06	CSKA Moscow	RSL	4	0	1	1	4	1	0	0	0	0
2005–06	CSKA–2 Moscow	RUS.3	48	17	22	39	74	—	—	—	—	—
2006–07	CSKA Moscow	RSL	48	4	1	5	18	12	0	1	1	2
2006–07	CSKA–2 Moscow	RUS.3	7	7	2	9	4	—	—	—	—	—
2007–08	CSKA Moscow	RSL	30	5	2	7	6	—	—	—	—	—
2007–08	CSKA–2 Moscow	RUS.3	4	3	4	7	4	12	8	7	15	8
2008–09	Lowell Devils	AHL	69	11	23	34	26	—	—	—	—	—
2009–10	Lowell Devils	AHL	23	6	15	21	6	—	—	—	—	—
2009–10	New Jersey Devils	NHL	40	0	10	10	8	—	—	—	—	—
2010–11	Albany Devils	AHL	31	8	11	19	19	—	—	—	—	—
2010–11	New Jersey Devils	NHL	38	2	2	4	2	—	—	—	—	—
2011–12	Albany Devils	AHL	62	16	23	39	45	—	—	—	—	—
2011–12	New Jersey Devils	NHL	4	0	0	0	0	—	—	—	—	—
2012–13	CSKA Moscow	KHL	47	9	2	11	4	3	0	0	0	0
2013–14	CSKA Moscow	KHL	49	2	5	7	6	4	0	0	0	2
2014–15	CSKA Moscow	KHL	51	8	6	14	6	16	1	3	4	8
2015–16	CSKA Moscow	KHL	29	2	4	6	12	19	2	2	4	6
2016–17	CSKA Moscow	KHL	51	5	7	12	32	10	1	2	3	8
2017–18	CSKA Moscow	KHL	35	0	1	1	18	15	0	2	2	12
2018–19	Salavat Yulaev Ufa	KHL	56	6	10	16	48	17	1	2	3	4
2019–20	Salavat Yulaev Ufa	KHL	59	4	9	13	34	6	2	2	4	0
2020–21	Salavat Yulaev Ufa	KHL	52	4	15	19	36	7	0	1	1	0
2021–22	Avangard Omsk	KHL	41	4	7	11	4	11	0	3	3	10
2022–23	Avangard Omsk	KHL	54	3	7	10	10	14	0	2	2	2
2023–24	Traktor Chelyabinsk	KHL	33	2	3	5	10	14	0	1	1	4
2024–25	Traktor Chelyabinsk	KHL	57	3	13	16	14	16	0	0	0	4
2025–26	Traktor Chelyabinsk	KHL	59	2	4	6	16	5	0	0	0	4
NHL totals			82	2	12	14	10	—	—	—	—	—
KHL totals			673	54	93	147	250	157	7	20	27	64

=== International ===
Year	Team	Event	Result	GP	G	A	Pts	PIM
2005	Russia	IH18	4th	5	2	1	3	6
2006	Russia	U18	5th	6	1	2	3	6
Junior totals				11	3	3	6	12
