= Steven Zalewski =

American ice hockey player (born 1986)

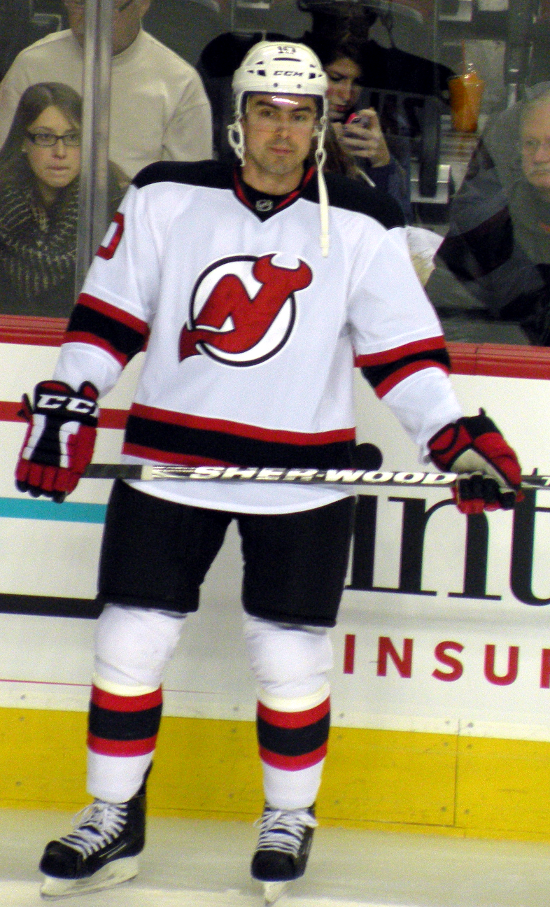
- Zalewski playing for the New Jersey Devils during the 2011–12 season
- Born: August 20, 1986 (age 39) New Hartford, New York, U.S.
- Height: 5 ft 11 in (180 cm)
- Weight: 190 lb (86 kg; 13 st 8 lb)
- Position: Center
- Shot: Left
- Played for: San Jose Sharks; New Jersey Devils; Lukko; Ilves; Straubing Tigers
- NHL draft: 153rd overall, 2004; San Jose Sharks
- Playing career: 2008–2018

Steven Zalewski (born August 20, 1986) is an American former professional ice hockey center. He most recently played with the Straubing Tigers of the Deutsche Eishockey Liga (DEL). Zalewski was drafted 153rd overall in the 2004 NHL entry draft by the San Jose Sharks.

== Playing career ==
Zalewski played high school hockey for the NYS Section III Division 2, New Hartford Spartans and was named NYS Player of the year in 2002. Zalewski played college hockey for four years at Clarkson University, scoring 108 points in 151 games. Following a brief stint with the Worcester Sharks of the American Hockey League at the end of the 2007–08 season, Zalewski played 75 games for the team in 2008–09. He collected 13 goals and 26 assists in his first season of professional play. After scoring a goal in three games at the beginning of the 2009–10 AHL season, Zalewski made his NHL debut with the San Jose Sharks on October 12, 2009 against the Phoenix Coyotes.

Zalewski was traded along with Jay Leach to the New Jersey Devils for Patrick Davis and Mike Swift. During the 2011–12 season, Zalewski was recalled from AHL affiliate, the Albany Devils, and appeared in 7 games for New Jersey.

On July 18, 2013, Zalewski signed as a free agent to a one-year contract with Finnish club, Lukko of the Liiga, and the next year stayed in Liiga, signing a one-year contract for Ilves.

After two seasons in Finland, Zalewski continued his career abroad, moving to Germany in signing an initial one-year deal with the Straubing Tigers of the DEL on June 17, 2015, that was extended for another year in 2016.

He featured in international hockey for the first time in 2015, playing three games for the US National team in the Deutschland Cup in Germany. He was a late addition to the squad, replacing Auston Matthews after he was ruled out with a back injury.

== Personal ==
Two of Zalewski's brothers have played professionally, Rich played in the Southern Hockey League, and Mike who has played professional hockey in the NHL, AHL, DEL and Austrian professional league. His sister, Annika Zalewski, plays professionally with the PWHPA, having previously played for the Buffalo Beauts.

== Career statistics ==
			Regular season					Playoffs
Season	Team	League	GP	G	A	Pts	PIM	GP	G	A	Pts	PIM
2002–03	New Hampton School	HS Prep
2003–04	Northwood School	HS Prep	40	32	34	66	22	—	—	—	—	—
2004–05	Clarkson University	ECAC	39	12	7	19	60	—	—	—	—	—
2005–06	Clarkson University	ECAC	35	9	13	22	50	—	—	—	—	—
2006–07	Clarkson University	ECAC	39	16	18	34	44	—	—	—	—	—
2007–08	Clarkson University	ECAC	38	21	12	33	34	—	—	—	—	—
2007–08	Worcester Sharks	AHL	7	2	4	6	0	—	—	—	—	—
2008–09	Worcester Sharks	AHL	75	13	26	39	26	12	0	1	1	6
2009–10	Worcester Sharks	AHL	78	22	40	62	20	11	1	5	6	4
2009–10	San Jose Sharks	NHL	3	0	0	0	0	—	—	—	—	—
2010–11	Worcester Sharks	AHL	50	4	17	21	14	—	—	—	—	—
2010–11	Albany Devils	AHL	31	11	12	23	14	—	—	—	—	—
2011–12	Albany Devils	AHL	69	19	22	41	48	—	—	—	—	—
2011–12	New Jersey Devils	NHL	7	0	0	0	0	—	—	—	—	—
2012–13	Albany Devils	AHL	73	11	30	41	52	—	—	—	—	—
2013–14	Lukko	Liiga	31	6	5	11	37	15	1	5	6	2
2014–15	Ilves	Liiga	46	5	11	16	36	2	1	0	1	2
2015–16	Straubing Tigers	DEL	52	17	23	40	26	7	1	1	2	2
2016–17	Straubing Tigers	DEL	50	5	12	17	20	2	0	0	0	0
2017–18	Straubing Tigers	DEL	37	2	13	15	6	—	—	—	—	—
AHL totals			383	82	151	233	185	23	1	6	7	10
NHL totals			10	0	0	0	0	—	—	—	—	—
DEL totals			139	24	48	72	52	9	1	1	2	2

== Awards and honors ==
Award	Year
USHS
NYS Player of the Year	2002
College
NCAA (ECAC) Champion	2007
ECAC First All-Star Team	2008
Professional
Emile Francis Trophy	2010
SM-liiga Bronze Medal	2014
International
Deutschland Cup Runner-Up	2015
