= Peter Harrold =

American ice hockey player

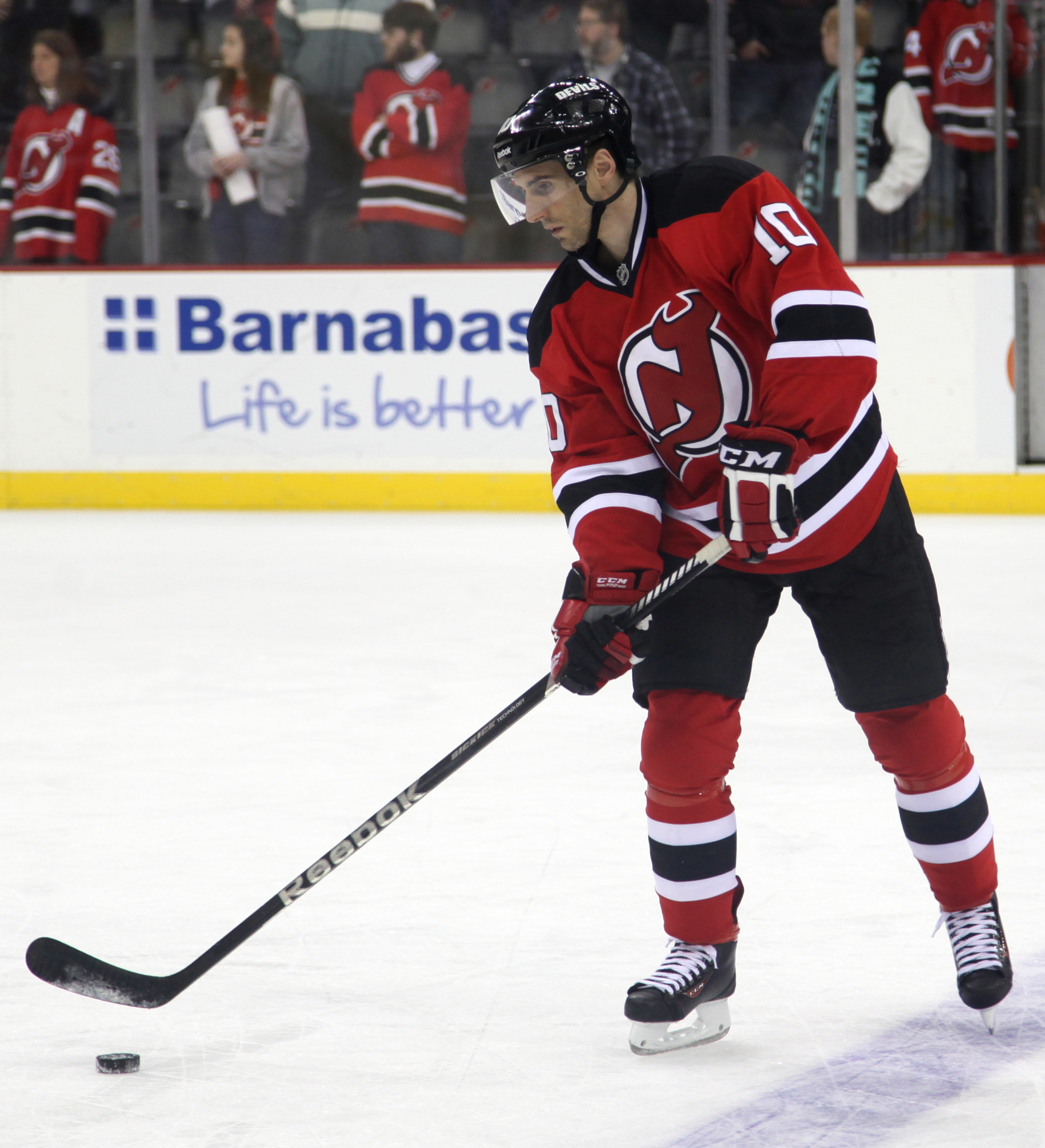
- Harrold with the New Jersey Devils in 2013
- Born: June 8, 1983 (age 43) Kirtland Hills, Ohio, U.S.
- Height: 5 ft 11 in (180 cm)
- Weight: 195 lb (88 kg; 13 st 13 lb)
- Position: Defense
- Shot: Right
- Played for: Los Angeles Kings; New Jersey Devils
- National team: United States
- NHL draft: Undrafted
- Playing career: 2006–2016

Peter Jacob Harrold (born June 8, 1983) is an American retired professional ice hockey defenseman who played in the National Hockey League with the Los Angeles Kings and New Jersey Devils. He has served as the Director of Player Development for the Carolina Hurricanes since 2024.

== Early life ==
Harrold was born on June 8, 1983, in Kirtland Hills, Ohio, U.S to parents Linda and Jim. His older brother Josh played four years of collegiate hockey at Miami University.

== Playing career ==
=== Collegiate ===
As a teenager, Harrold attended Hawken School, which did not have an ice hockey program. As such, he played three seasons for the Cleveland Junior Barons and on several USA Select teams. He also competed on Hawken's baseball team. Harrold was subsequently recruited by Boston College to compete in their NCAA Division I program, turning down contending offers from Boston University, Michigan State, and Ohio State.

Harrold played for the Boston College Eagles from 2002 to 2006 while majoring in history in the Morrissey College of Arts and Sciences. As a freshman, Harrold scored one goal and 11 assists through 39 games, and earned the team's Bernie Burke Outstanding Freshman Award. He credited Boston College's former defense coach for helping ease his transition into collegiate hockey. Harrold improved in his sophomore season, registering 14 points and helping the Eagles advance to the 2004 Frozen Four.

During his senior season, he played a pivotal role in leading the Eagles to the 2006 Frozen Four, where they competed against the Wisconsin Badgers in the national semifinals.

=== Professional ===
After making the jump to professional hockey, Harrold scored his first NHL goal on February 23, 2008, at Staples Center, beating Chicago Blackhawks goalie Patrick Lalime. His skills and experience also earned him a spot on the U.S. national team, and in 2009, he represented the United States at the IIHF World Championship.

On August 12, 2011, Harrold signed a one-year, two-way contract with the New Jersey Devils.

Following four seasons with the Devils' organization, Harrold became a free agent and signed a one-year, two-way contract with the St. Louis Blues on July 2, 2015. After participating in the Blues' 2015 training camp, he was assigned to their AHL affiliate, the Chicago Wolves, where he spent the entire 2015–16 season. Serving as a veteran presence on the blue line, Harrold recorded 1 goal and 23 assists for a total of 24 points over 70 games, marking the conclusion of his 10-year professional hockey career.

== Post playing career ==
Harrold joined the Carolina Hurricanes organization as a skills development coach during the 2019-20 season. He was then promoted to Director of Player Development for the Carolina Hurricanes in 2024.

== Personal life ==
Harrold is married to Casey, the daughter of former NFL wide receiver Dwight Clark.

== Career statistics ==
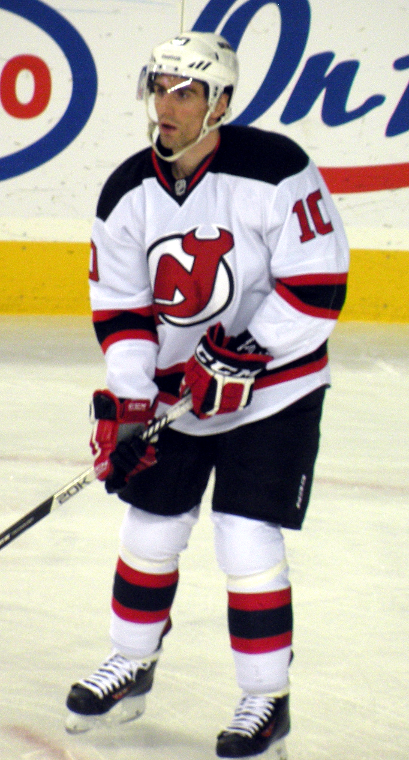
Harrold as a member of the New Jersey Devils.

=== Regular season and playoffs ===
			Regular season					Playoffs
Season	Team	League	GP	G	A	Pts	PIM	GP	G	A	Pts	PIM
1999–00	Cleveland Jr. Barons	NAHL	8	0	1	1	6	—	—	—	—	—
2000–01	Cleveland Jr. Barons	NAHL	55	5	23	28	34	—	—	—	—	—
2001–02	Cleveland Jr. Barons	NAHL	54	5	19	24	38	—	—	—	—	—
2002–03	Boston College	HE	39	1	11	12	20	—	—	—	—	—
2003–04	Boston College	HE	40	2	12	14	12	—	—	—	—	—
2004–05	Boston College	HE	35	4	10	14	22	—	—	—	—	—
2005–06	Boston College	HE	42	7	23	30	32	—	—	—	—	—
2006–07	Manchester Monarchs	AHL	62	7	27	34	43	16	3	8	11	18
2006–07	Los Angeles Kings	NHL	12	0	2	2	8	—	—	—	—	—
2007–08	Manchester Monarchs	AHL	49	7	36	43	25	4	0	1	1	4
2007–08	Los Angeles Kings	NHL	25	2	3	5	2	—	—	—	—	—
2008–09	Los Angeles Kings	NHL	69	4	8	12	28	—	—	—	—	—
2009–10	Los Angeles Kings	NHL	39	1	2	3	8	2	0	0	0	0
2010–11	Los Angeles Kings	NHL	19	1	3	4	4	—	—	—	—	—
2011–12	New Jersey Devils	NHL	11	0	2	2	0	17	0	4	4	6
2011–12	Albany Devils	AHL	61	5	21	26	36	—	—	—	—	—
2012–13	New Jersey Devils	NHL	23	2	3	5	6	—	—	—	—	—
2013–14	New Jersey Devils	NHL	33	0	4	4	14	—	—	—	—	—
2014–15	Albany Devils	AHL	13	1	1	2	10	—	—	—	—	—
2014–15	New Jersey Devils	NHL	43	3	2	5	4	—	—	—	—	—
2015–16	Chicago Wolves	AHL	70	1	23	24	24	—	—	—	—	—
NHL totals			274	13	29	42	74	19	0	4	4	6

=== International ===
Year	Team	Event	Result	GP	G	A	Pts	PIM
2009	United States	WC	4th	3	0	0	0	0
Senior totals				3	0	0	0	0

== Awards and honors ==
Award	Year
College
All-Hockey East First Team	2005–06
AHCA East First-Team All-American	2005–06

Awards and achievements
Preceded by Tim Judy	Hockey East Best Defensive Defenseman; 2005–06	Succeeded by Sean Sullivan
