= New Hartford (village), New York =

New Hartford, New York
- Village
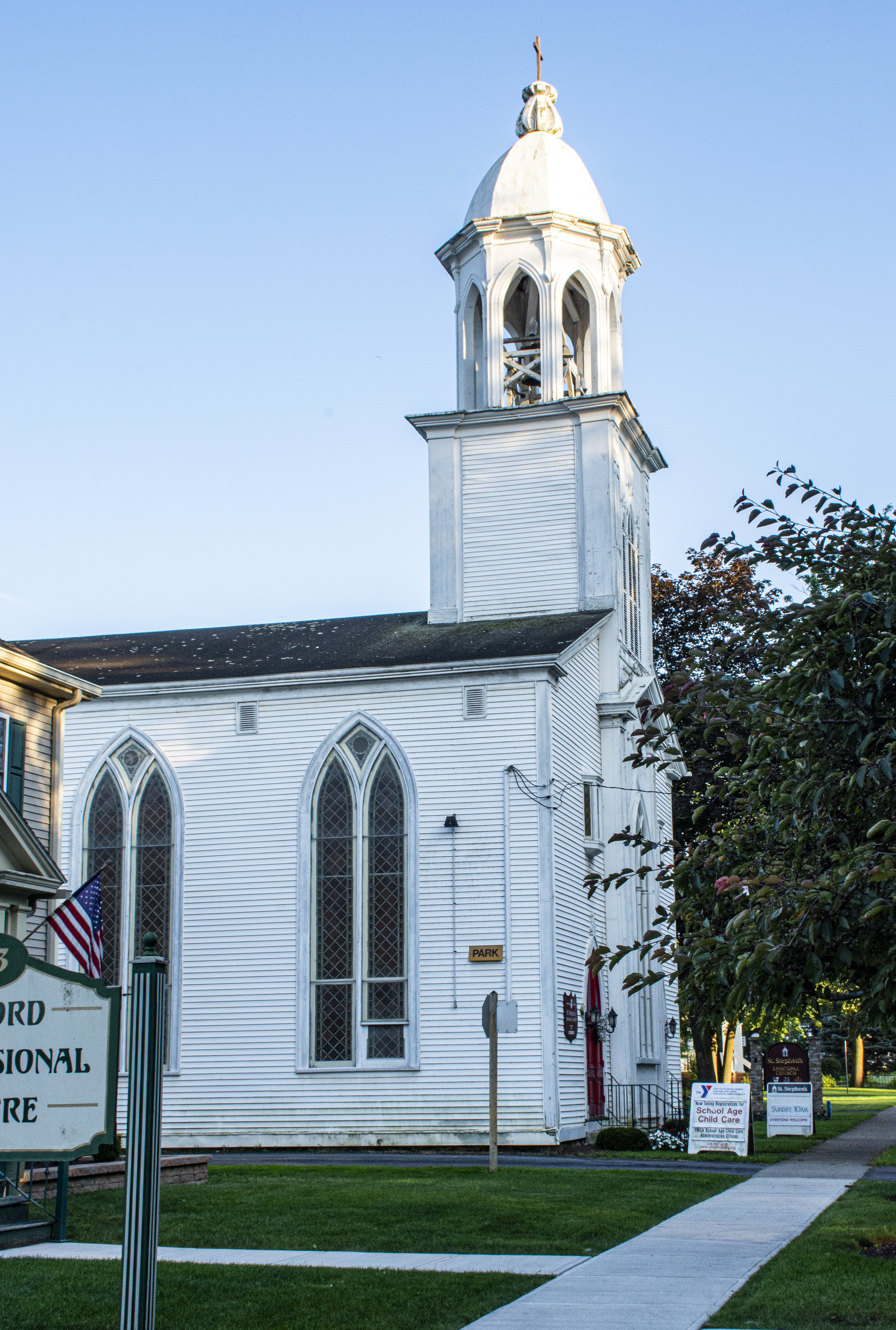
- St. Stephen's Church in the village of New Hartford

- Location in Oneida County and the state of New York.
- Coordinates: 43°4′9″N 75°17′18″W
- Country: United States
- State: New York
- County: Oneida

Area
  - Total: 0.62 sq mi (1.60 km^{2})
  - Land: 0.62 sq mi (1.60 km^{2})
  - Water: 0 sq mi (0.00 km^{2})
- Elevation: 541 ft (165 m)

Population (2020)
  - Total: 1,859
  - Density: 3,002.0/sq mi (1,159.09/km^{2})
- Time zone: UTC-5 (Eastern (EST))
  - Summer (DST): UTC-4 (EDT)
- ZIP code: 13413
- Area code: 315
- FIPS code: 36-50298
- GNIS feature ID: 0958418
- Website: villageofnewhartford.gov

For other places with this name, see New Hartford (disambiguation).

New Hartford is a village in Oneida County, New York, United States. The population was 1,859 at the 2020 census. The name was provided by early settlers from New Hartford, Connecticut. It is located inside the town New Hartford, near the border with Utica.

== History ==
The village was founded in 1789 by the construction of a log cabin by the Sanger family, who later constructed mills nearby. The village was a commercial success, until the opening of the Erie Canal gave Utica a big advantage.

The village of New Hartford was incorporated in 1869.

The village Fire Department was started in 1901. The NHFD provides fire protection and advanced life support emergency medical service to the village and portions of the town of New Hartford. These communities are served by an active corps of 98 volunteer firefighters. Based on dispatch records, it is the busiest volunteer fire department in Oneida County.

There are a few houses along Oxford Road that were used to hide slaves on the Underground Railroad.

St. Stephen's Church was listed on the National Register of Historic Places in 1996.

== Geography ==
New Hartford is located at 43°4′9″N 75°17′18″W (43.069169, -75.28846).

According to the United States Census Bureau, the village has a total area of 0.6 sq mi (1.6 km^{2}), all land.

== Demographics ==
Historical population
Census	Pop.	Note	%±
1870	743		—
1880	710		−4.4%
1890	912		28.5%
1900	1,007		10.4%
1910	1,195		18.7%
1920	1,621		35.6%
1930	1,885		16.3%
1940	1,914		1.5%
1950	1,947		1.7%
1960	2,468		26.8%
1970	2,433		−1.4%
1980	2,313		−4.9%
1990	2,111		−8.7%
2000	1,886		−10.7%
2010	1,847		−2.1%
2020	1,859		0.6%
U.S. Decennial Census

As of the census of 2000, there were 1,886 people, 857 households, and 501 families residing in the village. The population density was 3,087.0 inhabitants per square mile (1,191.9/km^{2}). There were 901 housing units at an average density of 1,474.8 per square mile (569.4/km^{2}). The racial makeup of the village was 96.98% White, 0.69% Black or African American, 0.21% Native American, 1.11% Asian, 0.27% from other races, and 0.74% from two or more races. Hispanic or Latino of any race were 0.80% of the population.

There were 857 households, out of which 24.9% had children under the age of 18 living with them, 47.5% were married couples living together, 9.2% had a female householder with no husband present, and 41.5% were non-families. 37.9% of all households were made up of individuals, and 21.7% had someone living alone who was 65 years of age or older. The average household size was 2.19 and the average family size was 2.93.

In the village, the population was spread out, with 22.2% under the age of 18, 5.7% from 18 to 24, 26.2% from 25 to 44, 24.3% from 45 to 64, and 21.7% who were 65 years of age or older. The median age was 42 years. For every 100 females, there were 85.4 males. For every 100 females age 18 and over, there were 77.7 males.

The median income for a household in the village was $43,563, and the median income for a family was $56,406. Males had a median income of $35,833 versus $27,139 for females. The per capita income for the village was $23,177. About 3.2% of families and 5.7% of the population were below the poverty line, including 6.0% of those under age 18 and 2.9% of those age 65 or over.
