= Bradley Mills =

Canadian ice hockey player (born 1983)

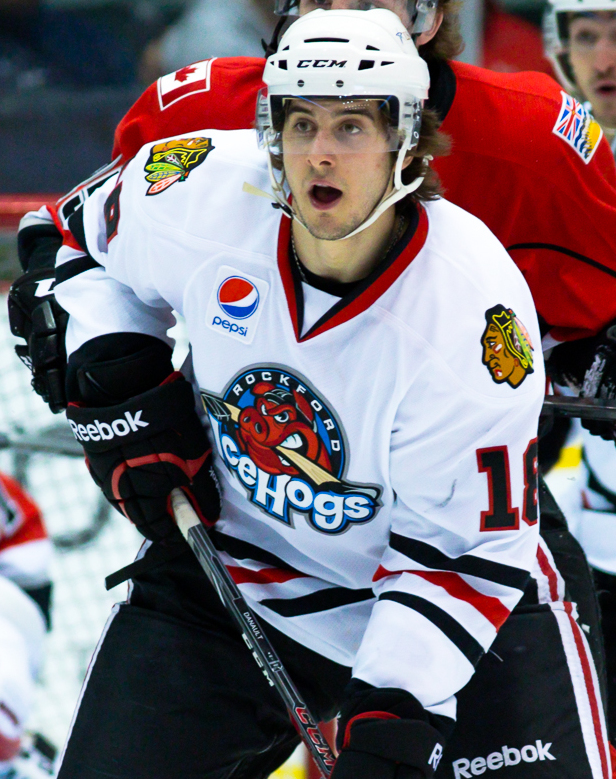
- Mills with the Rockford IceHogs in 2014
- Born: May 3, 1983 (age 43) Terrace, British Columbia, Canada
- Height: 6 ft 0 in (183 cm)
- Weight: 195 lb (88 kg; 13 st 13 lb)
- Position: Centre
- Shot: Right
- Played for: New Jersey Devils; Chicago Blackhawks; Rutgers Scarlet Knights
- NHL draft: Undrafted
- Playing career: 2007–2015

Bradley "Brad" Mills (born May 3, 1983) is a Canadian former professional ice hockey forward who played in the National Hockey League (NHL) with the New Jersey Devils, Rutgers Scarlet Knights, and the Chicago Blackhawks.

== Playing career ==
On March 16, 2007, Mills was signed by the New Jersey Devils to a two-year entry-level contract. During the 2010–11 season, Mills was recalled from AHL affiliate, the Albany Devils, and scored his first NHL goal on November 3, 2010 against Marty Turco of the Chicago Blackhawks.

Affected as a free agent by the 2012 NHL lockout, Mills signed a contract with the Utah Grizzlies of the ECHL on October 3, 2012. In scoring 35 points in 27 games during the 2012–13 season with the Grizzlies, Mills was initially loaned to the Rockford IceHogs of the AHL, before he was signed to a contract to remain with the IceHogs on January 31, 2013.

On October 25, 2013, the IceHog's NHL affiliate, the Chicago Blackhawks, signed Mills for the remainder of the season, and immediately recalled him to the NHL.

In the summer of 2014, Mills signed a professional tryout with the Ottawa Senators' AHL affiliate Binghamton Senators. He made the team, and eventually signed a one-year, two-way contract with Ottawa on January 27, 2015. Mills was not recalled to the NHL during the 2014–15 season, appearing in 34 games totalling 14 points with Binghamton in his last season of his professional playing career.

== Career statistics ==
			Regular season					Playoffs
Season	Team	League	GP	G	A	Pts	PIM	GP	G	A	Pts	PIM
2002–03	Fort McMurray Oil Barons	AJHL	62	20	47	67	73	—	—	—	—	—
2003–04	Yale University	ECAC	27	4	7	11	18	—	—	—	—	—
2004–05	Yale University	ECAC	27	12	14	26	30	—	—	—	—	—
2005–06	Yale University	ECAC	22	8	8	16	65	—	—	—	—	—
2006–07	Yale University	ECAC	20	2	6	8	39	—	—	—	—	—
2006–07	Lowell Devils	AHL	8	0	1	1	4	—	—	—	—	—
2007–08	Trenton Devils	ECHL	16	1	2	3	44	—	—	—	—	—
2008–09	Lowell Devils	AHL	75	5	16	21	108	—	—	—	—	—
2009–10	Lowell Devils	AHL	51	12	7	19	67	2	1	2	3	4
2010–11	Albany Devils	AHL	53	15	9	24	102	—	—	—	—	—
2010–11	New Jersey Devils	NHL	4	1	0	1	5	—	—	—	—	—
2011–12	New Jersey Devils	NHL	27	0	1	1	32	—	—	—	—	—
2011–12	Albany Devils	AHL	49	6	16	22	90	—	—	—	—	—
2012–13	Utah Grizzlies	ECHL	27	15	20	35	116	—	—	—	—	—
2012–13	Rockford IceHogs	AHL	33	7	9	16	60	—	—	—	—	—
2013–14	Rockford IceHogs	AHL	28	8	6	14	49	—	—	—	—	—
2013–14	Chicago Blackhawks	NHL	3	0	0	0	0	—	—	—	—	—
2014–15	Binghamton Senators	AHL	34	4	10	14	79	—	—	—	—	—
NHL totals			34	1	1	2	37	—	—	—	—	—
