= Latridiinae =

Scientific classification
- Kingdom: Animalia
- Phylum: Arthropoda
- Clade: Pancrustacea
- Class: Insecta
- Order: Coleoptera
- Suborder: Polyphaga
- Infraorder: Cucujiformia
- Family: Latridiidae
- Subfamily: Latridiinae; Erichson, 1842

Subfamily of beetles

Latridiinae is a subfamily of tiny, little-known beetles in the family Latridiidae.

== Genera ==
Latridiinae contains the following genera:

- Adistemia Fall, 1899
- Besuchetia Dajoz, 1975
- Cartodere C. G. Thomson, 1859
- Dicastria Dajoz, 1967
- Dienerella Reitter, 1911
- Enicmus C. G. Thomson, 1859
- Euchionellus Reitter, 1908
- Eufallia Mannerheim, 1900
- Eufalloides Hinton, 1941
- Herfordia Halstead, 1967
- Latridius Herbst, 1793
- Lithostygnus Broun, 1886
- Metophtalmoides Dajoz, 1967
- Metophthalmus Mannerheim, 1850
- Mumfordia Van Dyke, 1932
- Nalpaumia Dajoz, 1967
- Revelieria Perris, 1869
- Stephostethus Le Conte, 1878
- Thes Semenov, 1910
