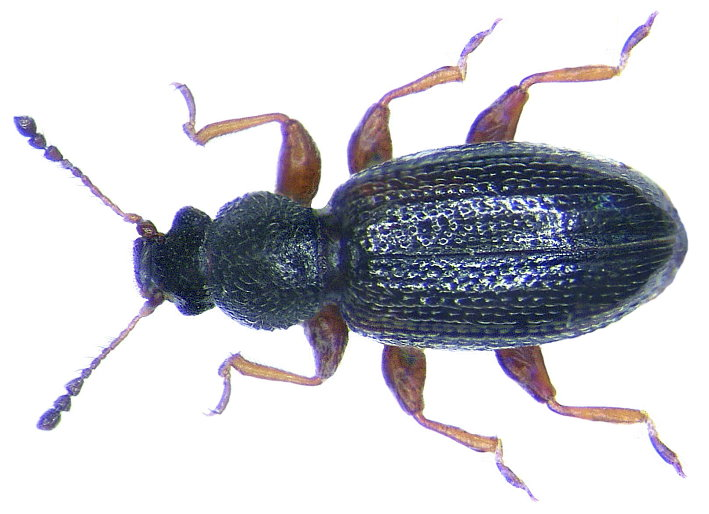
- Corticaria impressa

Scientific classification
- Kingdom: Animalia
- Phylum: Arthropoda
- Class: Insecta
- Order: Coleoptera
- Suborder: Polyphaga
- Infraorder: Cucujiformia
- Family: Latridiidae
- Subfamily: Corticariinae; Erichson, 1842

= Corticariinae =

Subfamily of beetles

Corticariinae is a subfamily of beetles in the family Latridiidae, containing the following genera:

- Austrophthalma Dajoz, 1966
- Bicava Belon, 1884
- Corticaria Marsham, 1802
- Corticarina Reitter, 1881
- Corticaromus Tarun K. Pal & Shelley Ghosh, 2008
- Cortinicara Johnson, 1975
- Fuchsina Fall, 1899
- Melanophthalma Motschulsky, 1866
- Migneauxia Jacquelin du Val, 1859
- Paracaria Dajoz, 1970
- Rethusus Broun, 1886
