= Cartodere elegans =

Scientific classification
- Kingdom: Animalia
- Phylum: Arthropoda
- Class: Insecta
- Order: Coleoptera
- Suborder: Polyphaga
- Infraorder: Cucujiformia
- Family: Latridiidae
- Genus: Cartodere
- Species: C. elegans

Binomial name
- Cartodere elegans (Aubé, 1850)

Species of beetle

Cartodere elegans is a species of small brown scavenger beetles in the genus Cartodere.

The area of this species includes the Sub-Mediterranean and southern France to the neighborhood of Paris. It also reported from Madeira, northern Italy, Ukraine and Hungary, where he was found in a stork nest. It is not yet known from the German states and Czechoslovakia, and not included in the key for the determination of Lathridiidae. In Poland, it has been recently shown in one position in the Western Sudetes. There is also a vague mention of its presence in Galicia.
