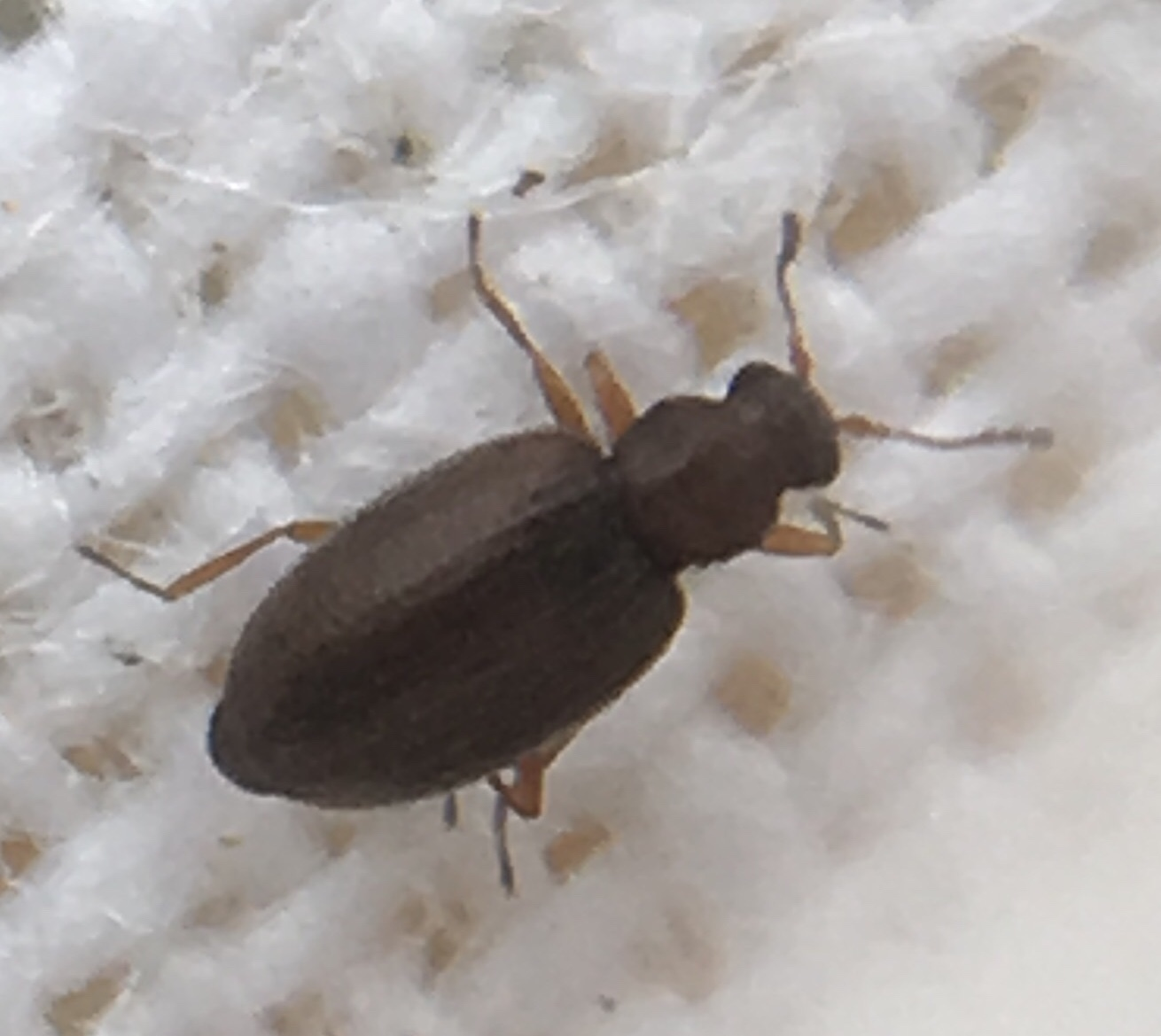
- Cortinicara gibbosa, UK

Scientific classification
- Kingdom: Animalia
- Phylum: Arthropoda
- Class: Insecta
- Order: Coleoptera
- Suborder: Polyphaga
- Infraorder: Cucujiformia
- Family: Latridiidae
- Subfamily: Corticariinae
- Genus: Cortinicara
- Species: C. gibbosa

Binomial name
- Cortinicara gibbosa (Herbst, 1793)

Synonyms
- Corticaria fuscotestacea Motschulsky, 1861; Corticaria gibbosa (Herbst, 1793); Corticaria pallida Marsham, 1802; Corticaria resecta Walker, 1859; Corticarina gibbosa (Herbst, 1793); Lathridius gibbosa Herbst, 1793; Latridius gibbosus Herbst, 1793; Latridius herbacea Gistel, 1857; Melanophthalma gibbosa (Herbst); Melanophthalma gibbula Motschulsky, 1866; Melanophthalma intricata Rey, 1889

= Cortinicara gibbosa =

Species of beetles

Cortinicara gibbosa is a species of minute brown scavenger beetle in the family Latridiidae.
