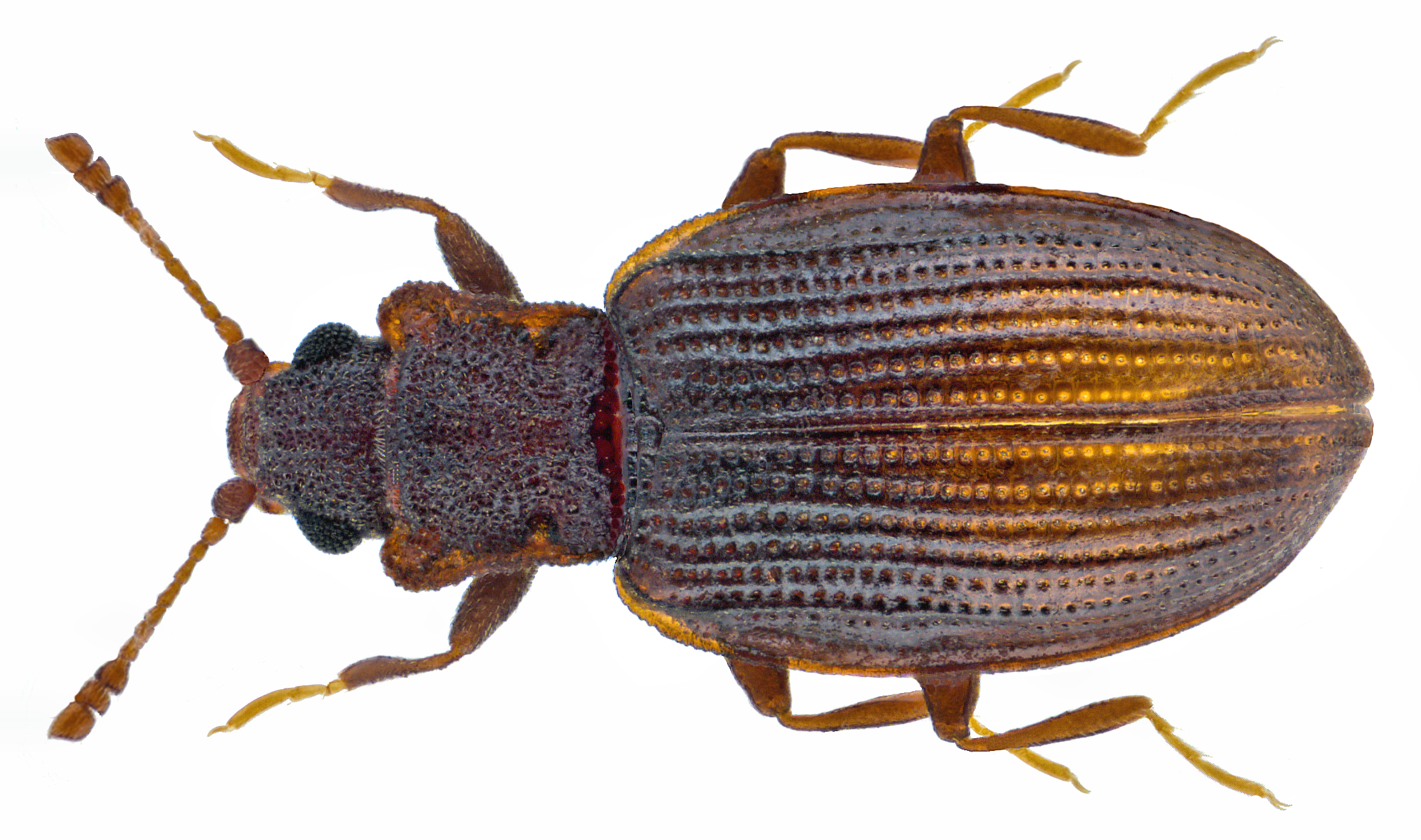

Scientific classification
- Kingdom: Animalia
- Phylum: Arthropoda
- Clade: Pancrustacea
- Class: Insecta
- Order: Coleoptera
- Suborder: Polyphaga
- Infraorder: Cucujiformia
- Family: Latridiidae
- Genus: Latridius
- Species: L. minutus

Binomial name
- Latridius minutus (Linnaeus, 1767)

Synonyms
- Lathridius minutus (L.)

= Latridius minutus =

Species of beetle

Latridius minutus, also known as the squarenosed fungus beetle, is a species of minute brown scavenger beetle in the family Latridiidae.

== Occurrence ==
Latridius minutus population peaks during the summer months and declines in the winter.
