= Corticaria elongata =

Scientific classification
- Kingdom: Animalia
- Phylum: Arthropoda
- Class: Insecta
- Order: Coleoptera
- Suborder: Polyphaga
- Infraorder: Cucujiformia
- Family: Latridiidae
- Genus: Corticaria
- Species: C. elongata

Binomial name
- Corticaria elongata Gyllenhal, 1827

Species of beetle

Corticaria elongata is a species of minute brown scavenger beetle in the family Latridiidae.
