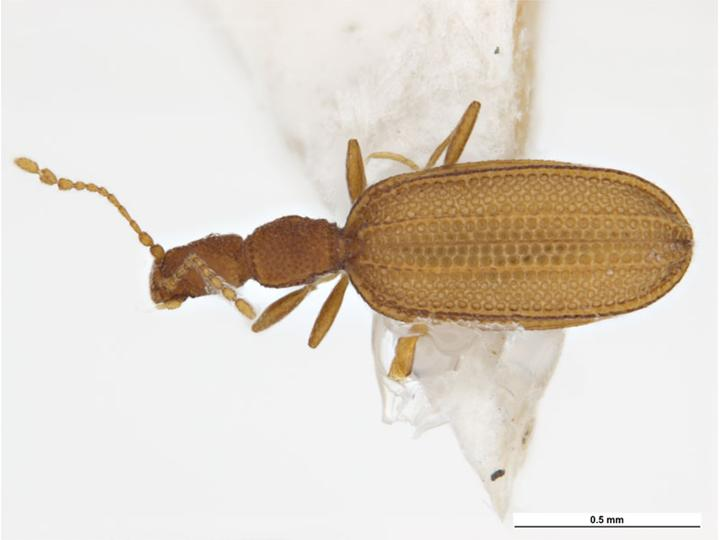

Scientific classification
- Kingdom: Animalia
- Phylum: Arthropoda
- Class: Insecta
- Order: Coleoptera
- Suborder: Polyphaga
- Infraorder: Cucujiformia
- Family: Latridiidae
- Genus: Adistemia
- Species: A. watsoni

Binomial name
- Adistemia watsoni (Wollaston, 1871)

= Adistemia watsoni =

Species of beetle

Adistemia watsoni is a species of minute brown scavenger beetles native to Europe.

== Distribution ==
This beetle is found in northern Africa, most of Europe, parts of Asia and North America. Its range includes Madeira, the Canary Islands, Morocco, Algeria and Egypt, Western Europe, Israel, Japan and Canada.
