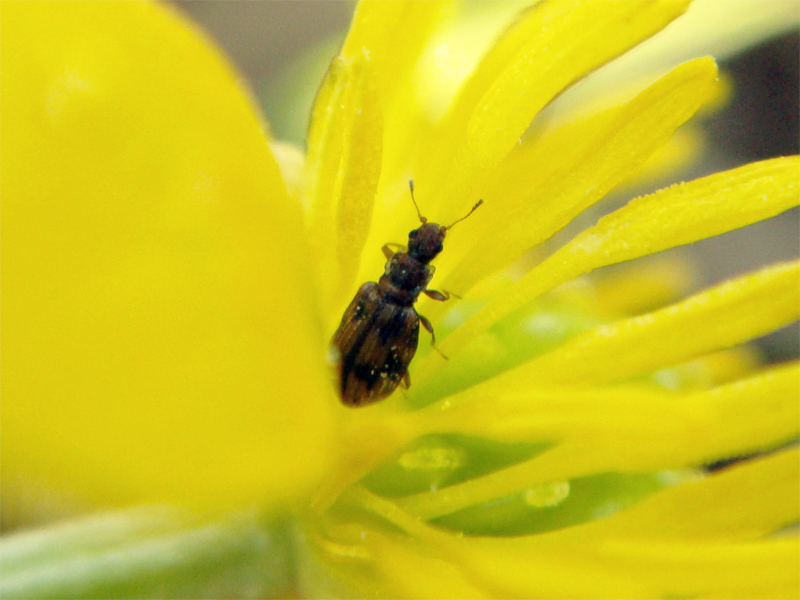

Scientific classification
- Kingdom: Animalia
- Phylum: Arthropoda
- Class: Insecta
- Order: Coleoptera
- Suborder: Polyphaga
- Infraorder: Cucujiformia
- Family: Latridiidae
- Genus: Cartodere
- Species: C. bifasciata

Binomial name
- Cartodere bifasciata (Reitter, 1877)

= Cartodere bifasciata =

Species of beetle

Cartodere bifasciata is a species of minute brown scavenger beetles native to Europe.
