= Enicmus histrio =

Scientific classification
- Kingdom: Animalia
- Phylum: Arthropoda
- Class: Insecta
- Order: Coleoptera
- Suborder: Polyphaga
- Infraorder: Cucujiformia
- Family: Latridiidae
- Genus: Enicmus
- Species: E. histrio

Binomial name
- Enicmus histrio Joy & Tomlin, 1910

Species of beetle

Enicmus histrio is a species of beetle belonging to the family Latridiidae.

It is native to Europe.
