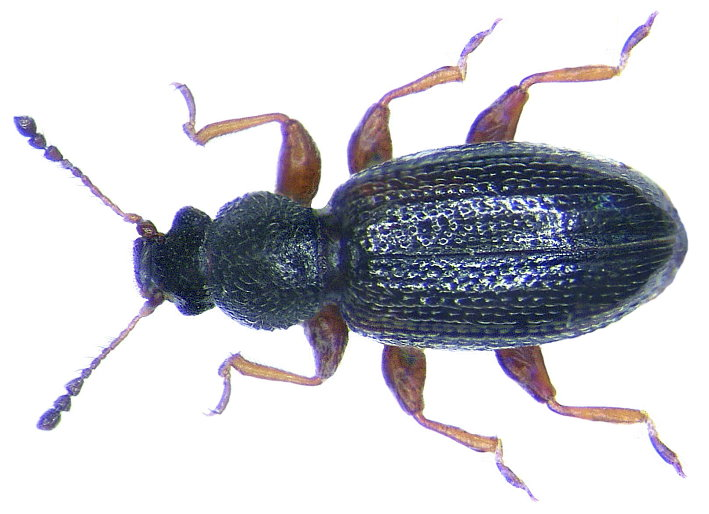
- Corticaria impressa 2,2-2,5 mm

Scientific classification
- Kingdom: Animalia
- Phylum: Arthropoda
- Clade: Pancrustacea
- Class: Insecta
- Order: Coleoptera
- Suborder: Polyphaga
- Infraorder: Cucujiformia
- Family: Latridiidae
- Genus: Corticaria
- Species: C. impressa

Binomial name
- Corticaria impressa (Olivier, 1790)

= Corticaria impressa =

Species of beetle

Corticaria impressa is a species of minute brown scavenger beetles native to Europe.
