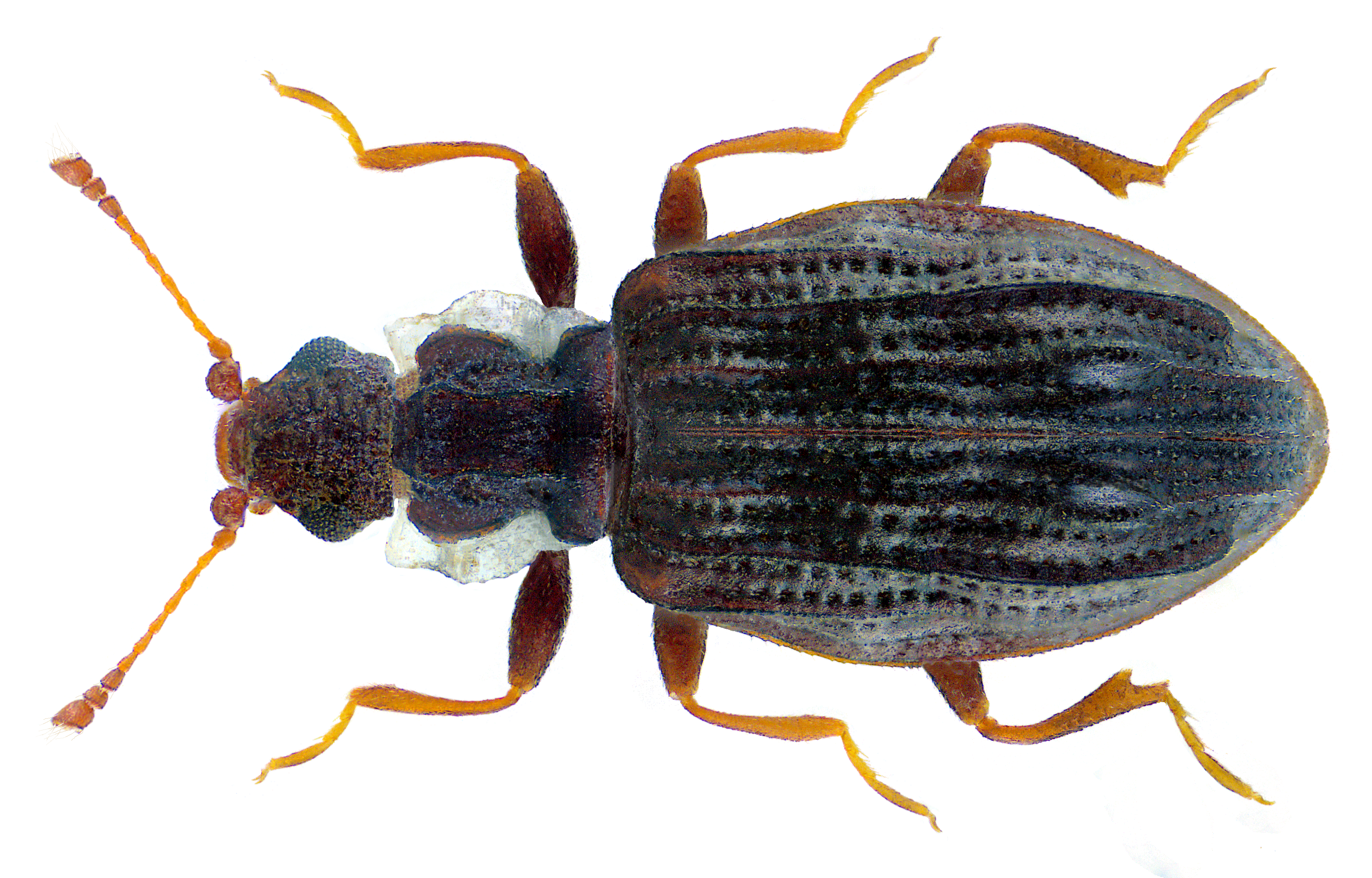
- Cartodere nodifer 2.0 mm (1,5 to 2.0 mm)

Scientific classification
- Kingdom: Animalia
- Phylum: Arthropoda
- Class: Insecta
- Order: Coleoptera
- Suborder: Polyphaga
- Infraorder: Cucujiformia
- Family: Latridiidae
- Genus: Cartodere
- Species: C. nodifer

Binomial name
- Cartodere nodifer (Westwood, 1839)

= Cartodere nodifer =

Species of beetle

Cartodere nodifer is a species of minute brown scavenger beetles native to Australia and New Zealand but now cosmopolitan.
