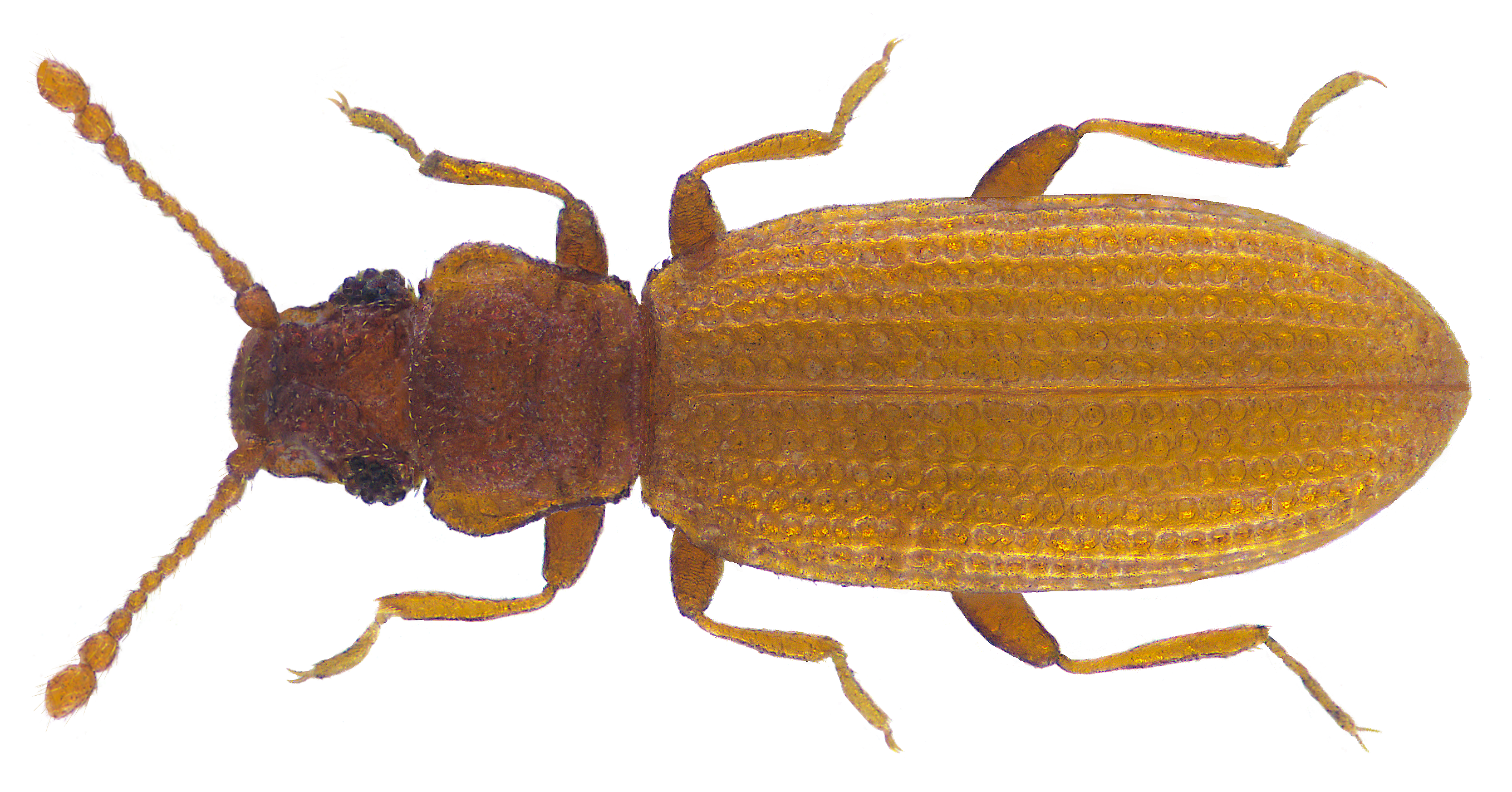
- Dienerella filum, common plaster beetle

Scientific classification
- Domain: Eukaryota
- Kingdom: Animalia
- Phylum: Arthropoda
- Class: Insecta
- Order: Coleoptera
- Suborder: Polyphaga
- Infraorder: Cucujiformia
- Family: Latridiidae
- Subfamily: Latridiinae
- Genus: Dienerella
- Species: D. filum

Binomial name
- Dienerella filum (Aubé, 1850)

Synonyms
- Cartodere filum (Aubé, 1850); Lathridius filum Aubé, 1850

= Dienerella filum =

Species of beetle

Dienerella filum, the common plaster beetle, is a species of fungus beetle in the family Latridiidae. It is found in damp conditions in buildings throughout the world, feeding on mould growing on the walls, and on poorly-stored products.

== Description ==
The adult common plaster beetle is between 1.2 and 1.6 mm (0.05 and 0.06 in) in length and brown in colour. The club at the tip of the antennae is formed from two segments which is in contrast to other members of the genus Dienerella which have a three-segmented club. The head has a suture along the midline, and the front half of the thoracic shield has a wide, fairly deep depression. There are no hind wings and this beetle cannot fly. The larva is whitish and reaches 1.7 and 2 mm (0.07 and 0.08 in) when fully grown and the pupa is cream-coloured and about 1 mm (0.04 in) long.

== Distribution and habitat ==
The common plaster beetle has near cosmopolitan distribution and is the most common, house-infesting, member of its large family. It is typically found in old warehouses and cellars, places with damp and crumbling plaster, under loose wallpaper, around leaking water pipes and ill-fitting windows, in fact anywhere indoors affected by moulds, which form its main diet. The beetles often appear in houses that are being renovated and replastered, especially where wallpaper is applied to the wall before the new plaster has properly dried out. They usually take three to four months to appear, but occasionally may take a year. It also infests improperly stored products such as mouldy bread, grain, cereal products, dried fruit, dried herbs, yeast and herbarium specimens. Hygiene problems in a hospital have been linked with infestations of Dienerella filum.

== Ecology ==
The diet of the common plaster beetle consists of the hyphae and spores of moulds, and the spores of slime moulds. The female beetle lays about twenty eggs during its life, singly in suitable spots. At 24 °C (75 °F) development may take about five weeks, but may take five months in colder environments.
