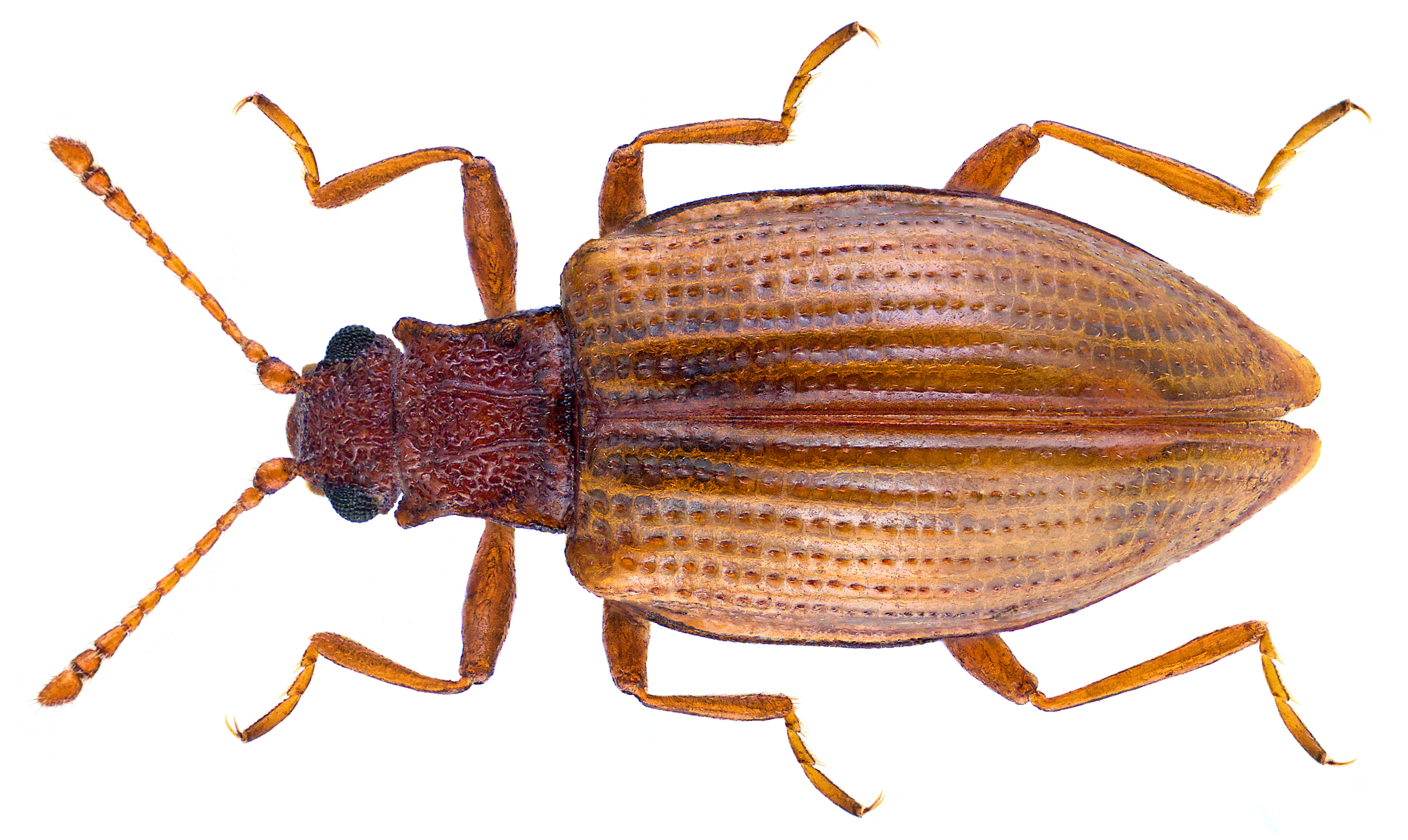

Scientific classification
- Domain: Eukaryota
- Kingdom: Animalia
- Phylum: Arthropoda
- Class: Insecta
- Order: Coleoptera
- Suborder: Polyphaga
- Infraorder: Cucujiformia
- Family: Latridiidae
- Genus: Stephostethus
- Species: S. lardarius

Binomial name
- Stephostethus lardarius (DeGeer, 1775)

= Stephostethus lardarius =

Species of beetle

Stephostethus lardarius is a species of minute brown scavenger beetle in the family Latridiidae.
