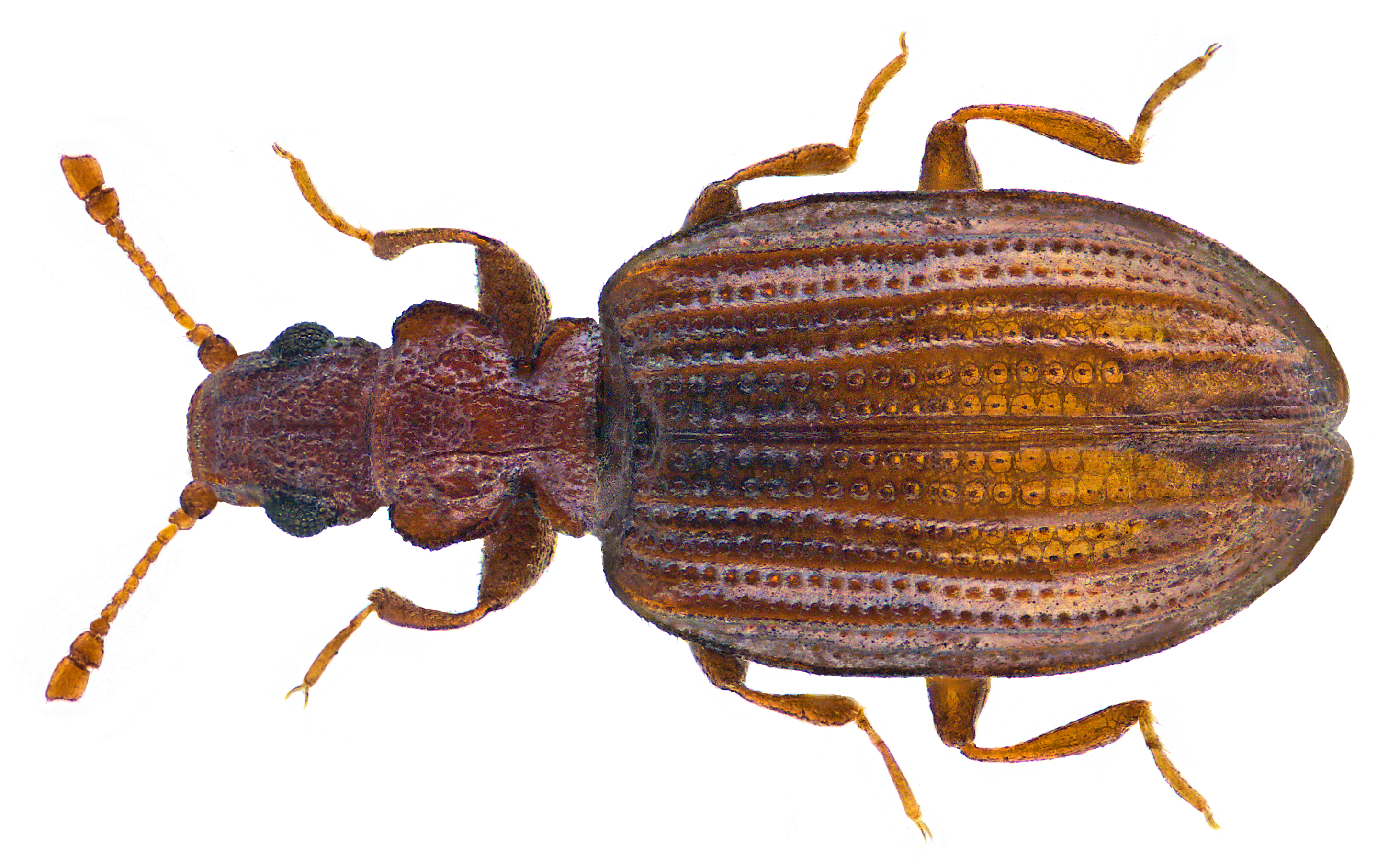

Scientific classification
- Domain: Eukaryota
- Kingdom: Animalia
- Phylum: Arthropoda
- Class: Insecta
- Order: Coleoptera
- Suborder: Polyphaga
- Infraorder: Cucujiformia
- Family: Latridiidae
- Genus: Cartodere
- Species: C. constricta

Binomial name
- Cartodere constricta (Gyllenhal, 1827)

= Cartodere constricta =

Species of beetle

Cartodere constricta, the plaster beetle, is a 1.3—2.0 mm long species of minute brown scavenger beetle in the family Latridiidae. Originally from the Palearctic, it now also occurs in the Nearctic. It is found throughout Europe and North Africa, east across Siberia to the Russian Far East, and south to Pakistan, India, China and Japan. It also occurs across southern Canada and throughout the USA. It is a mold feeder often found in: stored products such as grains and dry fruit, houses, feed mills, grain elevators, manure heaps and plant detritus. To get rid of this species, the key is drying out the problem area enough to stop mold growth; in general, reduce RH below 20%.
