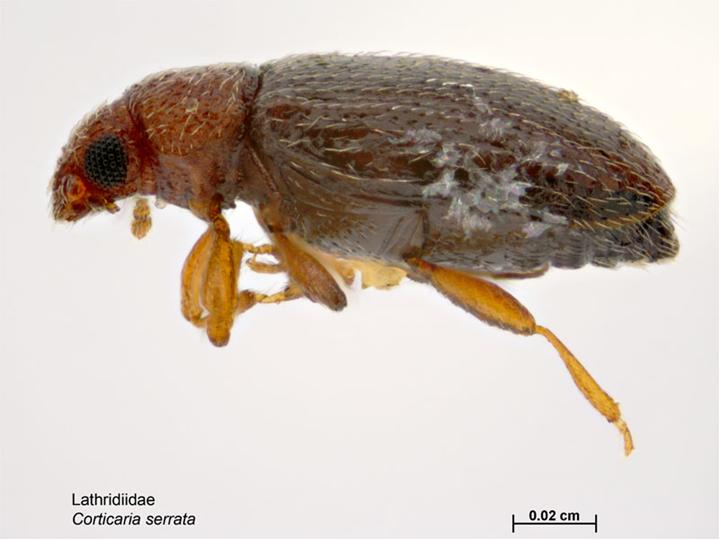
- Corticaria serrata

Scientific classification
- Kingdom: Animalia
- Phylum: Arthropoda
- Clade: Pancrustacea
- Class: Insecta
- Order: Coleoptera
- Suborder: Polyphaga
- Infraorder: Cucujiformia
- Family: Latridiidae
- Genus: Corticaria
- Species: C. serrata

Binomial name
- Corticaria serrata (Paykull, 1798)

= Corticaria serrata =

Species of beetle

Corticaria serrata is a species of minute brown scavenger beetles native to Europe.
