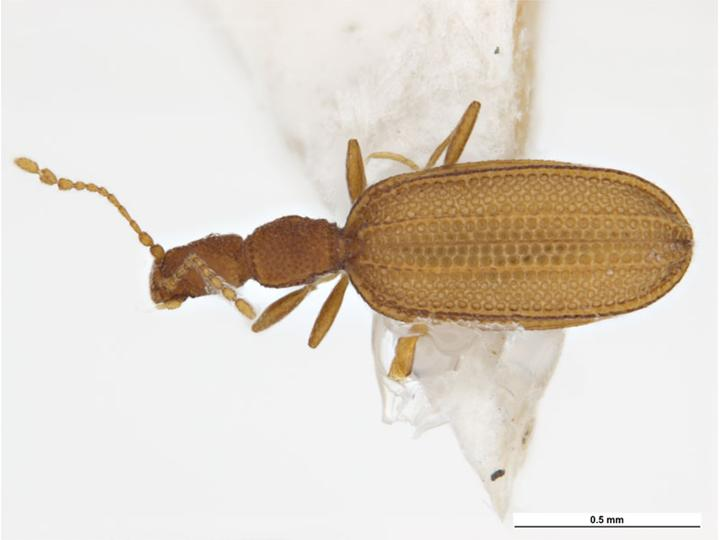
- Adistemia watsoni

Scientific classification
- Kingdom: Animalia
- Phylum: Arthropoda
- Class: Insecta
- Order: Coleoptera
- Suborder: Polyphaga
- Infraorder: Cucujiformia
- Family: Latridiidae
- Subfamily: Latridiinae
- Genus: Adistemia; Fall, 1899

= Adistemia =

Genus of beetles

Adistemia is a genus of beetles in the family Latridiidae, containing the following species:

- Adistemia bicarinata (Belon, 1897)
- Adistemia chilenisi Dajoz, 1974
- Adistemia ciliata Dajoz, 1967
- Adistemia convexa Dajoz, 1967
- Adistemia jeanneli Dajoz, 1960
- Adistemia microphthalma Dajoz, 1967
- Adistemia minuta Dajoz, 1967
- Adistemia petiti Dajoz, 1960
- Adistemia prenanti Dajoz, 1960
- Adistemia pubescens Dajoz, 1967
- Adistemia rileyi Hinton, 1941
- Adistemia watsoni (Wollaston, 1871)
