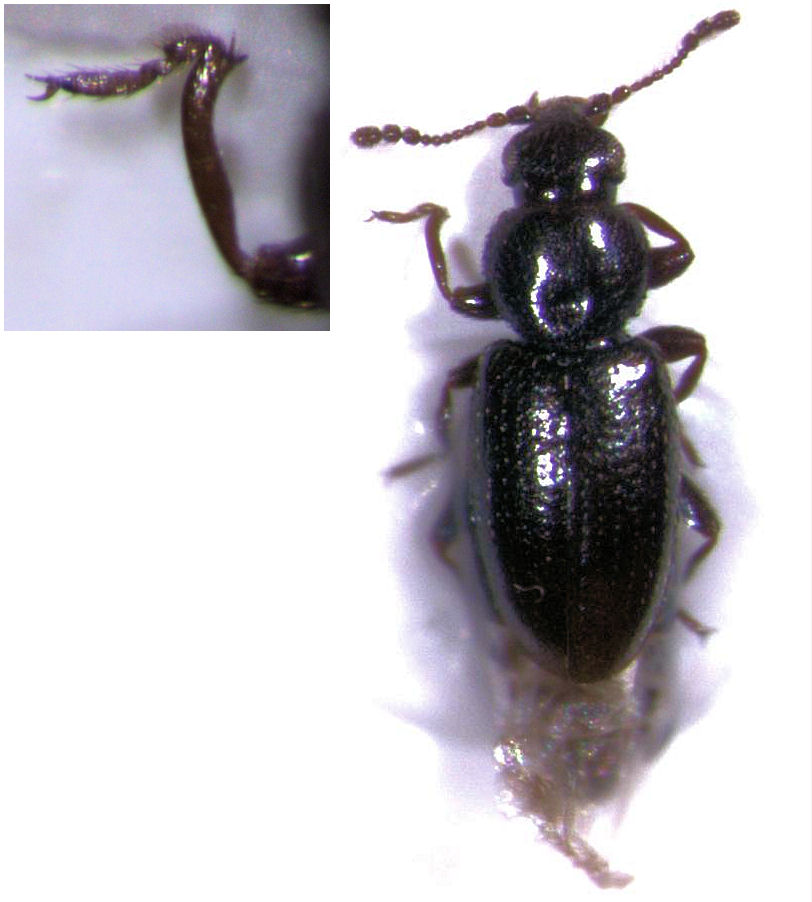
- Corticaria formicaephila

Scientific classification
- Domain: Eukaryota
- Kingdom: Animalia
- Phylum: Arthropoda
- Class: Insecta
- Order: Coleoptera
- Suborder: Polyphaga
- Infraorder: Cucujiformia
- Family: Latridiidae
- Subfamily: Corticariinae
- Genus: Corticaria; Marsham, 1802

= Corticaria =

Genus of beetles

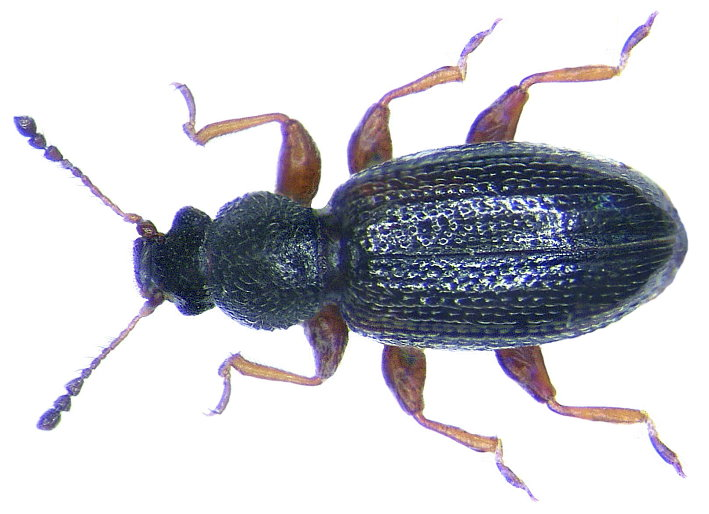
Corticaria impressa

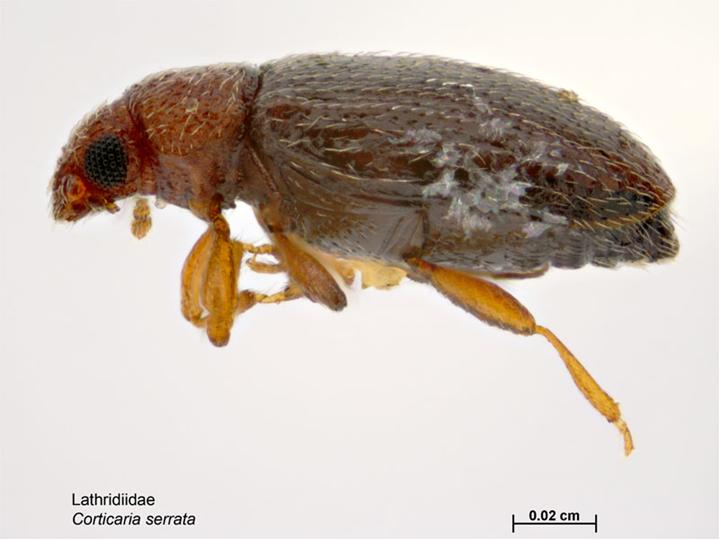
Corticaria serrata

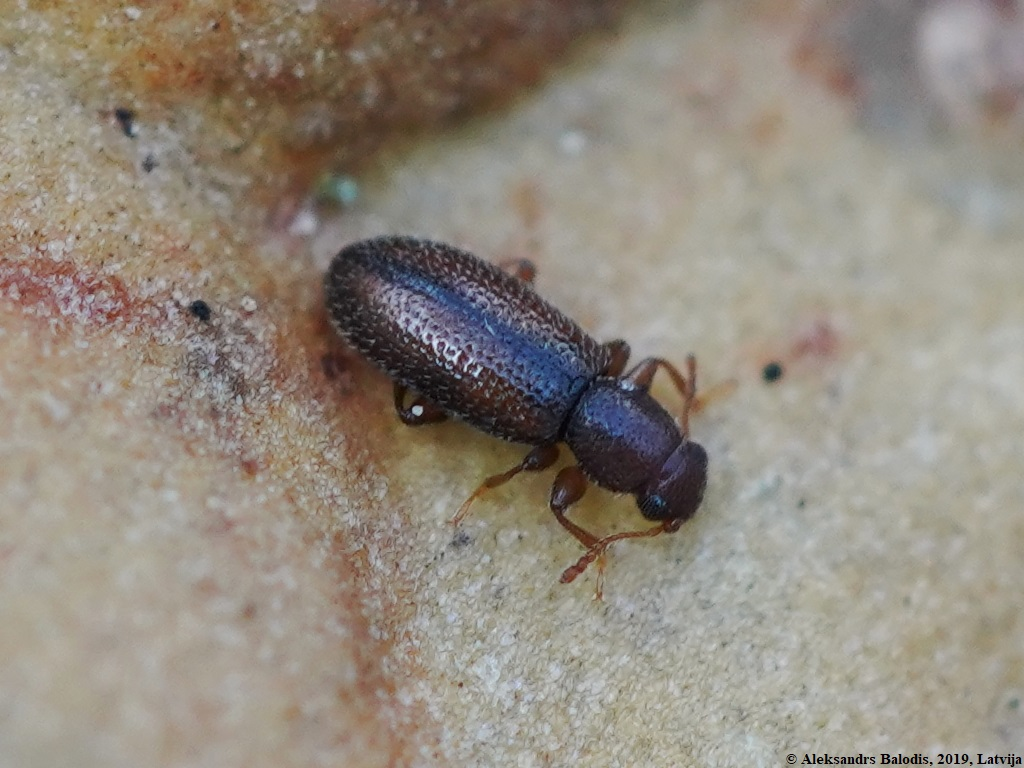
Corticaria umbilicata

Corticaria is a genus of beetles in the family Latridiidae.

== Description ==
Beetles of this genus have a small transverse scutellum. In most species, the pronotum has a round impression before the base. The prosternum has a pubescent (hairy) impression in front of each fore coxa, also visible from the sides. The sides of the prothorax are slightly dentate (toothed). The tarsi of all legs have three segments, as with all Latridiidae. In males, the first tarsomere of the fore tarsus is dilated.

In North America, this genus can be recognised by being >1.8 mm long and having rather elongate elytra.

== Ecology ==
Corticaria in nature live on mouldy substances, bark, wood waste, leaf litter, decaying seaweed and flowering vegetation. They can also be found in artificial environments such as stables, barns and piles of wood.

Adults of Corticaria impressa have been seen grazing lichens on decaying hazel bark.

== Species ==
This genus contains the following species:

- Corticaria abdominalis Dajoz, 1970
- Corticaria aculeata Johnson, 1977
- Corticaria aequabilis Rücker, 1981
- Corticaria aequalis (Reitter, 1898)
- Corticaria aethiops Grouvelle, 1914
- Corticaria alleni Johnson, 1974
- Corticaria alticola Lindberg, 1953
- Corticaria amplicollis Fall, 1899
- Corticaria amurensis Reitter, 1879
- Corticaria anatolica Johnson, 1989
- Corticaria aphictoides Reitter, 1898
- Corticaria apicalis Fall, 1899
- Corticaria appenhageni Uyttenboogaart, 1930
- Corticaria armata (Mannerheim, 1844)
- Corticaria basilewskyi Dajoz, 1970
- Corticaria bella Redtenbacher, 1849
- Corticaria beloni Reitter, 1889
- Corticaria bengaliensis Rücker, 1978
- Corticaria blackburni Rücker, 1989
- Corticaria brevicornis Fall, 1899
- Corticaria brevilata Rücker, 1978
- Corticaria buddha Johnson, 1977
- Corticaria cameruensis Dajoz, 1980
- Corticaria canaliculata Mannerheim, 1853
- Corticaria canariensis Johnson, 1974
- Corticaria carolina Fall, 1899
- Corticaria clavatula Broun, 1914
- Corticaria cognata Rücker, 1978
- Corticaria columbia Fall, 1899
- Corticaria convexa Reitter, 1881
- Corticaria corsica H. Brisout de Barneville, 1878
- Corticaria cotovillae Otero & Pazos, 1986
- Corticaria crenicollis Mannerheim, 1844
- Corticaria crenulata (Gyllenhal, 1827)
- Corticaria cretica Johnson, 1989
- Corticaria cribricollis Fairmaire, 1863
- Corticaria cucujiformis Reitter, 1880
- Corticaria curtipes Lövendal, 1893
- Corticaria debilis Motschulsky, 1867
- Corticaria decorsei Dajoz, 1970
- Corticaria delgerchangaji Rücker, 1983
- Corticaria dentigera Le Conte, 1855
- Corticaria dentiventris Poppius, 1903
- Corticaria desaegeri Dajoz, 1970
- Corticaria descarpentriesi Dajoz, 1970
- Corticaria diecki Reitter, 1875
- Corticaria dinshuensis Johnson, 1976
- Corticaria distincta Dajoz, 1970
- Corticaria dubia Dajoz, 1970
- Corticaria elgonensis Jeannel & Paulian, 1945
- Corticaria elongata (Gyllenhal, 1827)
- Corticaria espanyoli J.C. Otero & M.J. López, 2009
- Corticaria fagi Wollaston, 1854
- Corticaria fasciata Reitter, 1877
- Corticaria fastigata Rücker, 1978
- Corticaria fennica Johnson, 1974
- Corticaria ferruginea Marsham, 1802
- Corticaria formicaephila Broun, 1893
- Corticaria foveola (Beck, 1817)
- Corticaria franzi Dajoz,
- Corticaria fulva (Comolli, 1837)
- Corticaria fulvoides Johnson, 1989
- Corticaria garambae Dajoz, 1970
- Corticaria geisha Johnson, 1989
- Corticaria globicollis Rücker, 1989
- Corticaria gracilis Mannerheim, 1844
- Corticaria helios Rücker, 2006
- Corticaria hierroensis Johnson, 1985
- Corticaria humilis Sharp, 1902
- Corticaria ikarus Rücker, 2006
- Corticaria illaesa Mannerheim, 1844
- Corticaria impressa (Olivier, 1790)
- Corticaria incerta Fall, 1899
- Corticaria inconspicua Wollaston, 1860
- Corticaria inflatipennis Champion, 1922
- Corticaria inopia Fall, 1899
- Corticaria interstitialis Mannerheim, 1844
- Corticaria jaegeri Reike, 2006
- Corticaria japonica Reitter, 1877
- Corticaria johnsoni Marino & López & Otero
- Corticaria kabakovi Saluk, 1992
- Corticaria khnzoriani Johnson, 1989
- Corticaria laertes Rücker, 2006
- Corticaria langa Dajoz, 1979
- Corticaria lapponica (Zetterstedt, 1838)
- Corticaria lata Reike, 2010
- Corticaria lateritia Mannerheim, 1844
- Corticaria latulipennis Broun, 1914
- Corticaria leileri Johnson, 1985
- Corticaria lindensis Blackburn, 1891
- Corticaria lineatoserrata Johnson, 1976
- Corticaria lisae Reike, 2010
- Corticaria longicollis (Zetterstedt, 1838)
- Corticaria longicornis (Herbst, 1783)
- Corticaria luchti Rücker, 1985
- Corticaria maculosa lineata Johnson, 1974
- Corticaria maculosa maculosa Wollaston, 1858
- Corticaria magadanica Tsinkevich, 2001
- Corticaria martensi Johnson, 1977
- Corticaria mirabilis Dajoz, 1971
- Corticaria mongolica Rücker, 1983
- Corticaria nebulosa Champion, 1922
- Corticaria nigerrima Dajoz, 1970
- Corticaria obscura C. Brisout de Barneville, 1863
- Corticaria obsoleta Strand, 1940
- Corticaria occidua Fall, 1899
- Corticaria olympiaca Reitter, 1875
- Corticaria orbicollis (Mannerheim, 1853)
- Corticaria orientalis Champion, 1922
- Corticaria ornata Reitter, 1877
- Corticaria ovalipennis Rücker, 1989
- Corticaria ovicollis Reitter, 1887
- Corticaria ovipennis Reitter, 1887
- Corticaria parallela Fall, 1899
- Corticaria parvithorax Champion, 1922
- Corticaria peezi Johnson, 2007
- Corticaria pharaonis Motschulsky, 1867
- Corticaria picicornis Broun, 1914
- Corticaria pilosula Rosenhauer, 1856
- Corticaria pineti Lohse, 1960
- Corticaria pinicola C. Brisout de Barneville, 1866
- Corticaria planula Fall, 1899
- Corticaria poculifera Fall, 1899
- Corticaria polypori Sahlberg, 1900
- Corticaria porochini Johnson, 2007
- Corticaria poseidon Rücker, 2006
- Corticaria prionodera Le Conte, 1855
- Corticaria pubescens (Gyllenhal, 1827)
- Corticaria punctata Dajoz, 1970
- Corticaria punctulata Marsham, 1802
- Corticaria quadrimaculata Mannerheim, 1844
- Corticaria relicta Johnson, 1977
- Corticaria rhombifera Champion, 1922
- Corticaria rotundipennis Johnson, 1977
- Corticaria rubripes Mannerheim, 1844
- Corticaria rudis Fall, 1899
- Corticaria rueckeri J. C. Otero, P. Marino & M. J. López
- Corticaria rufa Johnson, 1976
- Corticaria rugipennis Reitter, 1881
- Corticaria ruwenzoriae Dajoz, 1970
- Corticaria saginata Mannerheim, 1844
- Corticaria salpingoides Motschulsky, 1867
- Corticaria serrata (Paykull, 1798)
- Corticaria serricollis Le Conte, 1855
- Corticaria spinulosa Mannerheim, 1852
- Corticaria strandi Roubal, 1934
- Corticaria striatopunctata Motschulsky, 1867
- Corticaria subamurensis Saluk, 1992
- Corticaria subpilosula Reitter, 1898
- Corticaria subtilissima Reitter, 1877
- Corticaria suspecta Johnson, 1989
- Corticaria sylvicola C. Brisout de Barneville, 1863
- Corticaria tarragonensis Dajoz, 1970
- Corticaria temporalis Fall, 1899
- Corticaria tenuipes Fall, 1899
- Corticaria thea Reitter, 1894
- Corticaria thomsoni Reitter, 1880
- Corticaria topali Rücker, 1978
- Corticaria transvalensis Dajoz, 1970
- Corticaria tuberculata Dajoz, 1970
- Corticaria tunisiensis H. Brisout de Barneville, 1884
- Corticaria umbilicata (Beck, 1817)
- Corticaria unca Reike, 2010
- Corticaria valida Fall, 1899
- Corticaria varicolor Fall, 1899
- Corticaria vestigia Rücker, 1981
