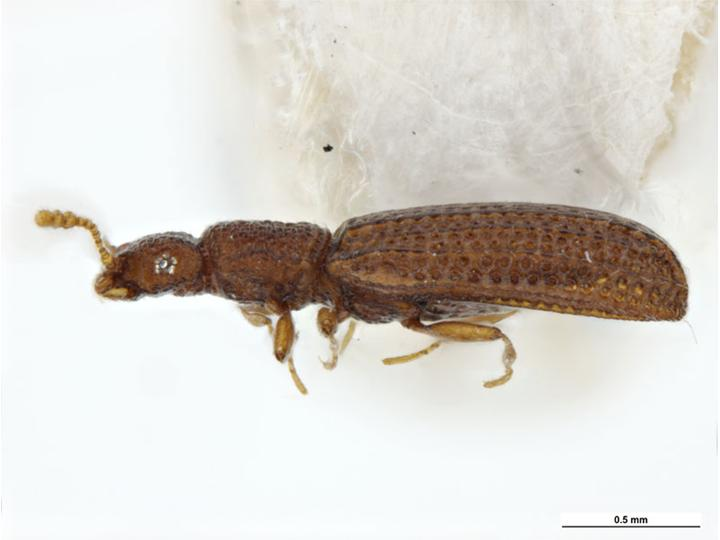
- Dienerella pilifera

Scientific classification
- Kingdom: Animalia
- Phylum: Arthropoda
- Class: Insecta
- Order: Coleoptera
- Suborder: Polyphaga
- Infraorder: Cucujiformia
- Family: Latridiidae
- Subfamily: Latridiinae
- Genus: Dienerella; Reitter, 1911

= Dienerella =

Genus of beetles

Dienerella is a genus of beetles in the family Latridiidae, containing the following species:

== Species ==
- D. acies Rücker, 1981
- D. adelphia Rücker, 1984
- D. aequalis (Reitter, 1878)
- D. africana Dajoz, 1970
- D. anatolica (Mannerheim, 1844)
- D. angelinii Rücker, 1998
- D. argus (Reitter, 1884)
- D. beloni (Reitter, 1882)
- D. besucheti Vincent, 1994
- D. clathrata (Mannerheim, 1844)
- D. corsica Vincent, 1990
- D. costulata (Reitter, 1877)
- D. crenicollis (Belon, 1885)
- D. elegans (Aubé, 1850)
- D. falliana (Sharp, 1902)
- D. filiformis (Gyllenhal, 1827)
- D. filum (Aubé, 1850)
- D. grouvellei (Belon, 1897)
- D. huguettae Vincent, 1991
- D. intermedia (Belon, 1884)
- D. kashmirensis (Sen Gupta, 1976)
- D. kerzhneri V. A. Tsinkevich, 2007
- D. laevithorax (Belon, 1895)
- D. laticeps (Reitter, 1884)
- D. lurida Rücker, 1983
- D. marginata Rücker, 1983
- D. navicula Rücker, 1986
- D. oeceticola Brèthes, 1922
- D. ovata (Sen Gupta, 1976)
- D. parilis (Rey, 1889)
- D. perpusilla (Walkley, 1858)
- D. pilifera (Reitter, 1875)
- D. ruficollis (Marsham, 1802)
- D. schueppeli (Reitter, 1881)
- D. separanda (Reitter, 1887)
- D. siciliana Vincent, 1990
- D. spinigera Rücker, 1986
- D. sucina Rücker, 1986
- D. vincenti Johnson, 2007
