= Stephostethus =

- Stephostethus alternans on fallen beech

Scientific classification
- Kingdom: Animalia
- Phylum: Arthropoda
- Class: Insecta
- Order: Coleoptera
- Suborder: Polyphaga
- Infraorder: Cucujiformia
- Family: Latridiidae
- Subfamily: Latridiinae
- Genus: Stephostethus; Le Conte, 1878

Genus of beetles

Stephostethus is a genus of beetles in the family Latridiidae.

== Species ==
- Stephostethus altaicus (Reitter, 1902)
- Stephostethus alternans (Mannerheim, 1844)
- Stephostethus angusticollis (Gyllenhal, 1827)
- Stephostethus armatulus (Fall, 1899)
- Stephostethus arunus Sen Gupta, 1983
- Stephostethus attenuatus (Mannerheim, 1844)
- Stephostethus barunus Sen Gupta, 1983
- Stephostethus belonianus (Reitter, 1889)
- Stephostethus bilobatus Walkley, 1952
- Stephostethus breviclavus Fall, 1899
- Stephostethus carinatus Sen Gupta, 1976
- Stephostethus caucasicus (Mannerheim, 1844)
- Stephostethus chinensis (Reitter, 1877)
- Stephostethus cinnamopterus (Mannerheim, 1853)
- Stephostethus costicollis (Le Conte, 1855)
- Stephostethus curtulus (Mannerheim, 1853)
- Stephostethus indicus (Motschulsky, 1866)
- Stephostethus kashmirensis Sen Gupta, 1983
- Stephostethus lardarius (De Geer, 1775)
- Stephostethus liratus (Le Conte, 1863)
- Stephostethus malibicus Sen Gupta, 1983
- Stephostethus malinicus Sen Gupta, 1983
- Stephostethus minaticus Sen Gupta, 1983
- Stephostethus montanus Fall, 1899
- Stephostethus muticus Sharp, 1902
- Stephostethus nepalensis Sen Gupta, 1983
- Stephostethus nigratus Sen Gupta, 1976
- Stephostethus pandellei (C. Brisout de Barneville, 1863)
- Stephostethus paradoxus Sen Gupta, 1976
- Stephostethus productus (Rosenhauer, 1856)
- Stephostethus renukae Sen Gupta, 1983
- Stephostethus rufifrons Broun 1914
- Stephostethus rugicollis (Olivier, 1790)
- Stephostethus rybinskii (Reitter, 1894)
- Stephostethus setosus Rücker, 2004
- Stephostethus tarunus Sen Gupta, 1983
- Stephostethus variolosus (Mannerheim, 1844)
