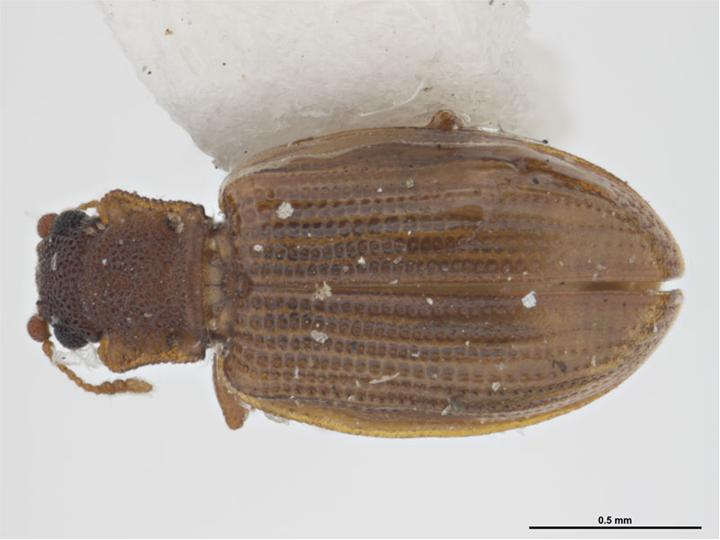
- Latridius minutus

Scientific classification
- Kingdom: Animalia
- Phylum: Arthropoda
- Clade: Pancrustacea
- Class: Insecta
- Order: Coleoptera
- Suborder: Polyphaga
- Infraorder: Cucujiformia
- Family: Latridiidae
- Subfamily: Latridiinae
- Genus: Latridius; Herbst, 1793

= Latridius =

Genus of beetles

Latridius is a genus of beetles in the family Latridiidae, containing the following species:

- Latridius amplus Johnson, 1977
- Latridius assimilis (Mannerheim, 1844)
- Latridius brevicollis (Thomson, 1868)
- Latridius canariensis (Palm, 1972)
- Latridius consimilis (Mannerheim, 1844)
- Latridius crenatus (Le Conte, 1855)
- Latridius desertus (Fall, 1899)
- Latridius gemellatus (Mannerheim, 1844)
- Latridius hirtus Gyllenhal, 1827
- Latridius minutus (Linnaeus, 1767)
- Latridius mongolicus Rücker, 1983
- Latridius nigritus (Fall, 1899)
- Latridius peacockae (Sen Gupta, 1976)
- Latridius perminutus Johnson, 1977
- Latridius reflexus (LeConte, 1855)
- Latridius porcatus (Herbst, 1793)
- Latridius protensicollis Mannerheim, 1843
