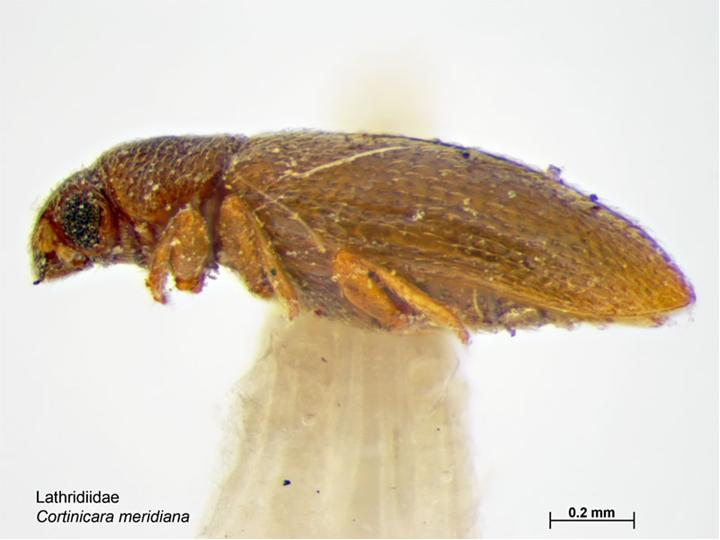
- Cortinicara meridiana

Scientific classification
- Domain: Eukaryota
- Kingdom: Animalia
- Phylum: Arthropoda
- Class: Insecta
- Order: Coleoptera
- Suborder: Polyphaga
- Infraorder: Cucujiformia
- Family: Latridiidae
- Subfamily: Corticariinae
- Genus: Cortinicara; Johnson, 1975

= Cortinicara =

Genus of beetles

Cortinicara is a genus of beetles in the family Latridiidae, containing the following species:

- Cortinicara afghana Johnson, 1977
- Cortinicara andersoni (Blackburn, 1891)
- Cortinicara baronowskii Johnson, 1989
- Cortinicara bhutanica Johnson, 1977
- Cortinicara biloba Rücker, 1984
- Cortinicara blatchleyi Johnson, 1989
- Cortinicara carinifrons Johnson, 1990
- Cortinicara conferta (Reitter, 1879)
- Cortinicara corpulenta (Motschulsky, 1866)
- Cortinicara fukiensis Johnson, 1990
- Cortinicara gibbosa (Herbst, 1793)
- Cortinicara hirtalis (Broun, 1880)
- Cortinicara luzonica Johnson, 1989
- Cortinicara meridiana Johnson, 1975
- Cortinicara vagepunctata (Broun, 1914)
