= Metophtalmoides =

Metophtalmoides castrii

Scientific classification
- Kingdom: Animalia
- Phylum: Arthropoda
- Class: Insecta
- Order: Coleoptera
- Suborder: Polyphaga
- Infraorder: Cucujiformia
- Family: Latridiidae
- Genus: Metophtalmoides; Dajoz, 1967
- Species: M. castrii

Binomial name
- Metophtalmoides castrii Dajoz, 1967

Genus of beetles

Metophtalmoides castrii is a species of beetles in the family Latridiidae, the only species in the genus Metophtalmoides.
