= Dicastria =

Dicastria temporalis

Scientific classification
- Kingdom: Animalia
- Phylum: Arthropoda
- Class: Insecta
- Order: Coleoptera
- Suborder: Polyphaga
- Infraorder: Cucujiformia
- Family: Latridiidae
- Genus: Dicastria; Dajoz, 1967
- Species: D. temporalis

Binomial name
- Dicastria temporalis Dajoz, 1967

Genus of beetles

Dicastria temporalis is a species of beetles in the family Latridiidae, the only species in the genus Dicastria.
