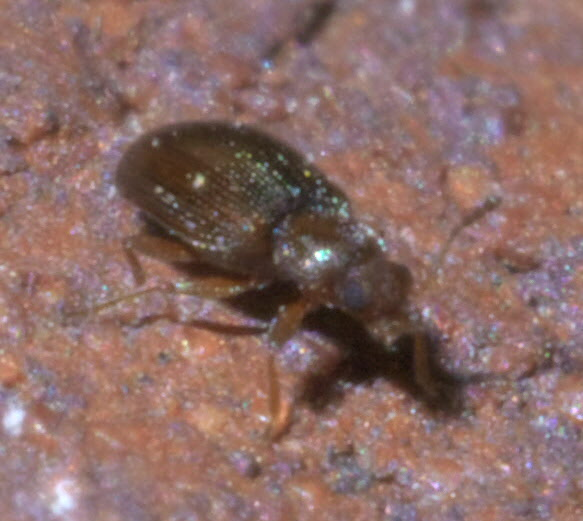

Scientific classification
- Kingdom: Animalia
- Phylum: Arthropoda
- Class: Insecta
- Order: Coleoptera
- Suborder: Polyphaga
- Infraorder: Cucujiformia
- Family: Latridiidae
- Genus: Corticarina; Reitter, 1881

= Corticarina =

Genus of beetles

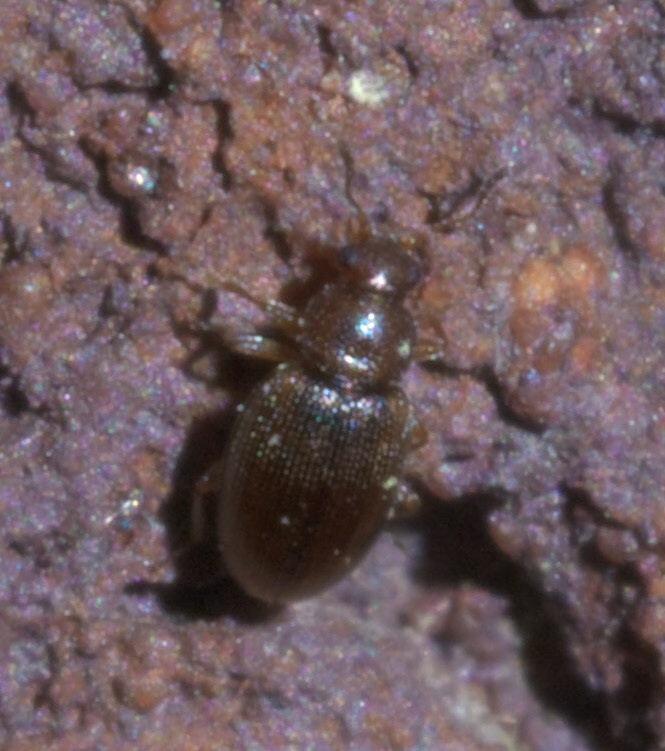
Corticarina

Corticarina is a genus of beetles in the family Latridiidae. Members of the Corticarina genus are characterized by antenna separated into eleven segments, with three clubbed apical segments, a smooth lateral margin of the pronotum, and a pronotal disc with a fovea close to the basal margin. The genus contains the following species:

- Corticarina acuta Johnson, 1975
- Corticarina acutoides Johnson, 1975
- Corticarina adamsi Johnson, 1981
- Corticarina alberta Fall, 1893
- Corticarina alemannica Schiller, 1984
- Corticarina amoena Johnson, 1981
- Corticarina amplipennis (Motschulsky, 1867)
- Corticarina angelensia Rücker, 1990
- Corticarina antipodum (Belon, 1885)
- Corticarina arcuata Rücker, 1979
- Corticarina ashei Johnson, 1997
- Corticarina australis (Blackburn, 1891)
- Corticarina baranowskii Johnson, 1989
- Corticarina beloni Johnson, 1981
- Corticarina benardi Dajoz, 1970
- Corticarina bhutanensis Johnson, 1977
- Corticarina bicolor Dajoz, 1970
- Corticarina biharensis Johnson, 1979
- Corticarina blatchleyi Johnson, 1989
- Corticarina boliviensis Rücker, 1981
- Corticarina brasiliensis Johnson, 1981
- Corticarina broadheadi Johnson, 1981
- Corticarina brooksi Johnson, 1997
- Corticarina bruta Johnson, 1977
- Corticarina carinifrons Johnson, 1989
- Corticarina cavicollis (Mannerheim, 1844)
- Corticarina centralis (Sharp, 1902)
- Corticarina championi Johnson, 1972
- Corticarina chinensis Johnson, 1972
- Corticarina clareae Johnson, 1972
- Corticarina clarula (Broun, 1895)
- Corticarina clayae Johnson, 1981
- Corticarina coei Johnson, 1972
- Corticarina cognata Johnson, 1972
- Corticarina conjuncta Johnson, 1997
- Corticarina convexipennis (Motschulsky, 1861)
- Corticarina curta (Wollaston, 1854)
- Corticarina curta oblongipennis Johnson, 1981
- Corticarina cyathigera Rücker, 1987
- Corticarina cylindronata (Motschulsky, 1866)
- Corticarina dajozi Johnson, 1975
- Corticarina darbyi Johnson, 1991
- Corticarina delicatula (Wollaston, 1871)
- Corticarina derougemonti Johnson, 1975
- Corticarina duplicata (Sharp, 1902)
- Corticarina eichlini Andrews, 1992
- Corticarina excavata Johnson, 1977
- Corticarina exigua (Mannerheim, 1853)
- Corticarina fornicata Otto, 1978
- Corticarina franzi Johnson, 1975
- Corticarina fraudulenta Johnson, 1972
- Corticarina fukiensis Johnson, 1989
- Corticarina gangolae Johnson, 1970
- Corticarina globifera (Motschulsky, 1867)
- Corticarina gracilenta Johnson, 1979
- Corticarina gracilicornis Jeannel & Paulian, 1945
- Corticarina guatemalica Johnson, 1997
- Corticarina guptai Johnson, 1979
- Corticarina guyanensis Dajoz, 1970
- Corticarina hammondi Johnson, 1972
- Corticarina hancocki Johnson, 1979
- Corticarina herbivagans (Le Conte, 1855)
- Corticarina hierroensis Johnson,
- Corticarina hoegei Johnson, 1979
- Corticarina horrida (Belon, 1897)
- Corticarina hova Johnson, 1981
- Corticarina ignea Johnson, 1979
- Corticarina impensa Johnson, 1997
- Corticarina inobservata Johnson, 1997
- Corticarina irkutensis Strand, 1968
- Corticarina johnsoni Rücker, 1979
- Corticarina kekenboschi Dajoz, 1970
- Corticarina khnzoriani Johnson, 1976
- Corticarina kiymbiae Rücker, 1982
- Corticarina klapperichi Johnson, 1981
- Corticarina kraussi Johnson, 1981
- Corticarina lambiana (Sharp, 1910)
- Corticarina latipennis (Sahlberg, 1871)
- Corticarina leleupi Rücker, 1982
- Corticarina lescheni Johnson, 1997
- Corticarina lobeliae Johnson, 1975
- Corticarina longipennis (Le Conte, 1855)
- Corticarina lutea Rücker, 1978
- Corticarina milleri Andrews, 1992
- Corticarina minuta (Fabricius, 1792)
- Corticarina montana Johnson, 1979
- Corticarina nakanei Johnson, 1976
- Corticarina nigerrima Johnson, 1975
- Corticarina nigra Johnson, 1975
- Corticarina nilgiriensis Johnson, 1979
- Corticarina orientalis Rücker, 1982
- Corticarina ovata Rücker, 1980
- Corticarina ovipennis (Motschulsky, 1867)
- Corticarina pacata (Broun, 1886)
- Corticarina paradoxa Saluk, 1992
- Corticarina parallela Johnson, 1972
- Corticarina parvula (Mannerheim, 1844)
- Corticarina planiuscula (Motschulsky, 1867)
- Corticarina portentosa Johnson, 1997
- Corticarina prashanta (2019)
- Corticarina pulchella Johnson, 1975
- Corticarina pullula (Motschulsky, 1867)
- Corticarina pusilla (Mannerheim, 1844)
- Corticarina rectangula (Motschulsky, 1867)
- Corticarina regularis (Le Conte, 1855)
- Corticarina reidi Johnson, 1989
- Corticarina rickardi Johnson, 1997
- Corticarina riedeli Johnson, 1991
- Corticarina riveti Johnson, 1981
- Corticarina rotundipennis (Wollaston, 1854)
- Corticarina saluki Johnson, 2006
- Corticarina scissa (Le Conte, 1855)
- Corticarina scotti Johnson, 1979
- Corticarina seminigra Johnson, 1975
- Corticarina sericella (Motschulsky, 1867)
- Corticarina serrula Brethes, 1922
- Corticarina setigera (Belon, 1885)
- Corticarina silvicola Rücker, 1985
- Corticarina similata (Gyllenhal, 1827)
- Corticarina simoni Johnson, 1981
- Corticarina steinheili Reitter, 1880
- Corticarina strandi Johnson, 1972
- Corticarina sturmi Rücker, 1985
- Corticarina subcognata Johnson, 1979
- Corticarina subgibbosa Johnson, 1972
- Corticarina subnitida (Motschulsky, 1867)
- Corticarina szunyoghyi Rücker, 1980
- Corticarina torrida Johnson, 1981
- Corticarina trichonota (Belon, 1898)
- Corticarina truncatella (Mannerheim, 1844)
- Corticarina truncatipennis Johnson, 1979
- Corticarina turneri Johnson, 1975
- Corticarina upembae Dajoz, 1970
- Corticarina vanschuytbroecki Dajoz, 1970
- Corticarina viatica Johnson, 1997
- Corticarina williamsi Johnson, 1975
- Corticarina wittmeri Johnson, 1979
- Corticarina wolamo Johnson, 1979
