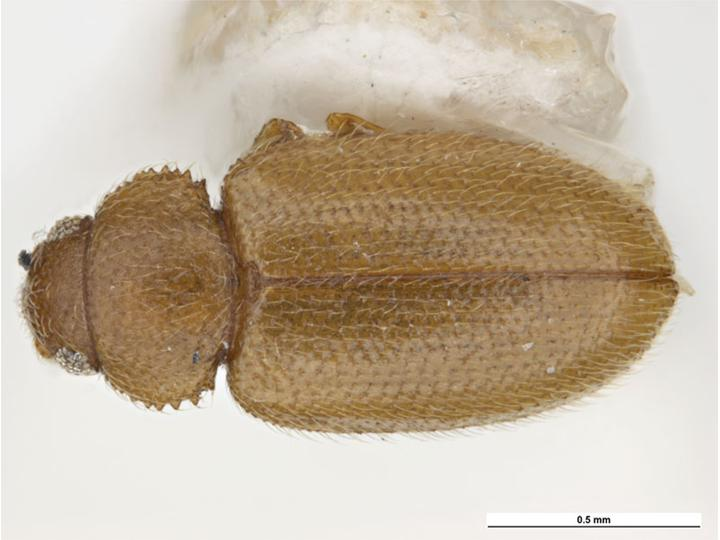
- Migneauxia orientalis

Scientific classification
- Kingdom: Animalia
- Phylum: Arthropoda
- Class: Insecta
- Order: Coleoptera
- Suborder: Polyphaga
- Infraorder: Cucujiformia
- Family: Latridiidae
- Genus: Migneauxia; Jacquelin du Val, 1859

= Migneauxia =

Genus of beetles

Migneauxia is a genus of beetles in the family Latridiidae, containing the following species:

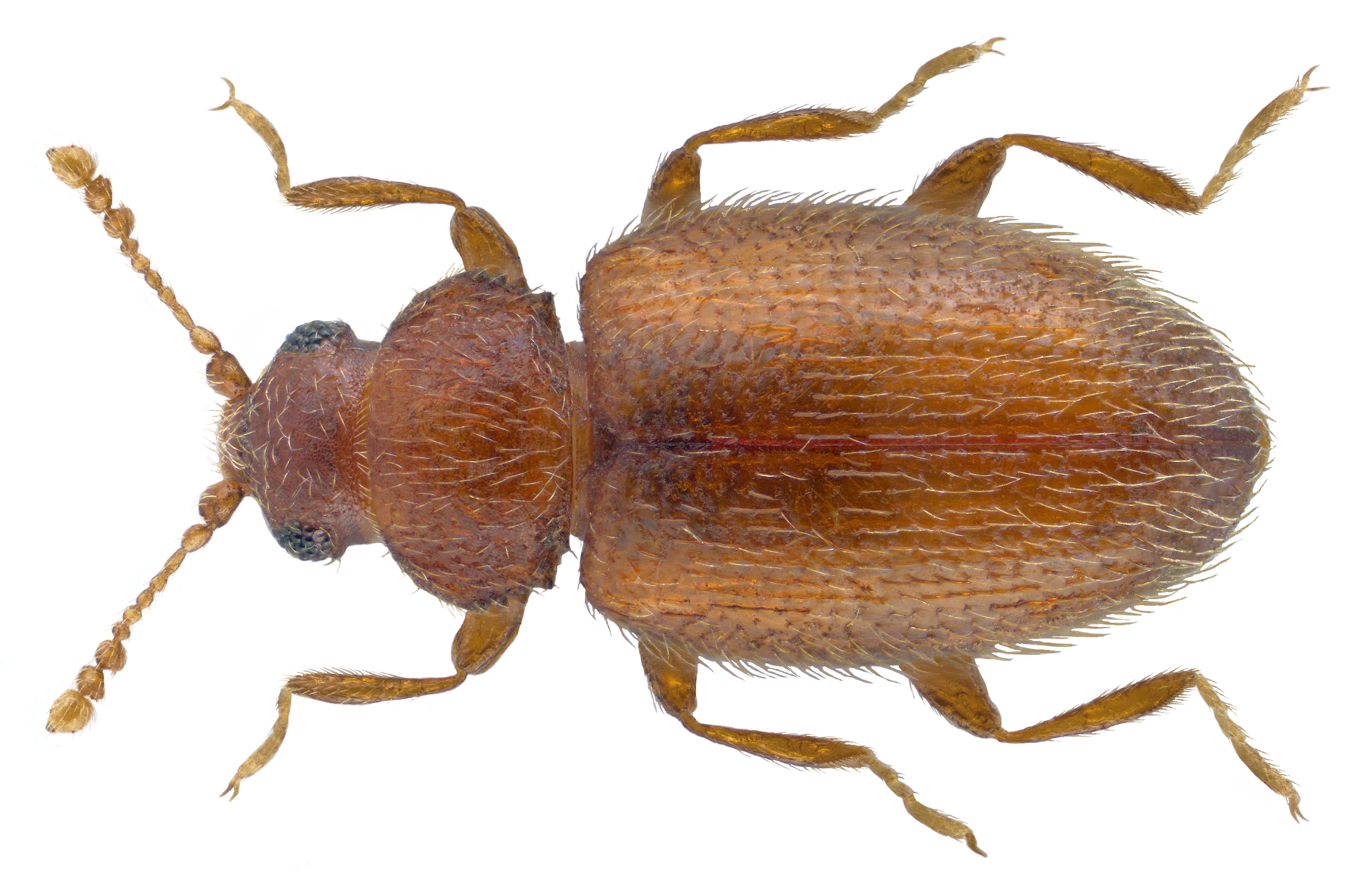
Migneauxia lederi

- Migneauxia atrata Johnson, 2007
- Migneauxia crassiuscula (Aubé, 1850)
- Migneauxia fuscata Johnson, 2007
- Migneauxia grandis Dajoz, 1966
- Migneauxia lederi Reitter, 1875
- Migneauxia mirei Dajoz, 1966
- Migneauxia ottoi Johnson, 2006
- Migneauxia phili Johnson, 2007
- Migneauxia psammeticha (Motschulsky, 1867)
- Migneauxia renaudi Dajoz, 1966
- Migneauxia subdola Johnson, 1977
