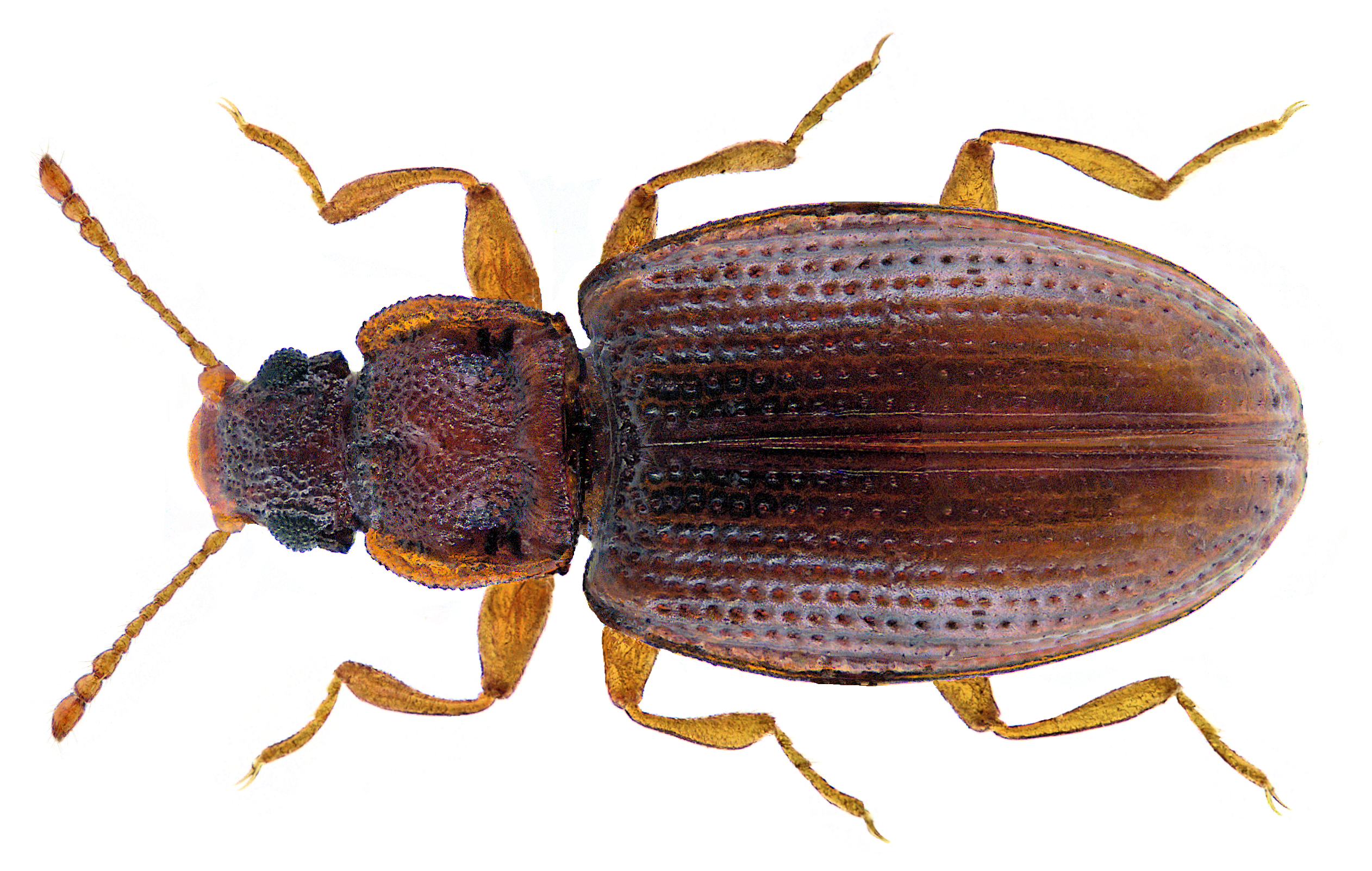
- Enicmus transversus

Scientific classification
- Kingdom: Animalia
- Phylum: Arthropoda
- Class: Insecta
- Order: Coleoptera
- Suborder: Polyphaga
- Infraorder: Cucujiformia
- Family: Latridiidae
- Genus: Enicmus; C. G. Thomson, 1859

Species
- about 50

= Enicmus =

Genus of beetles

Enicmus is a genus of beetles in the family Latridiidae, the minute brown scavenger beetles.

There are about 50 species.

- Enicmus alutaceus Reitter, 1885
- Enicmus amici Lohse, 1981
- Enicmus apicalis J. Sahlberg, 1926
- Enicmus aterrimus Motschulsky, 1866
- Enicmus atriceps Hansen, 1962
- Enicmus bifoveatus Broun, 1886
- Enicmus brasiliensis Mannerheim, 1844
- Enicmus brevicornis (Mannerheim, 1844)
- Enicmus callosus Rücker, 1985
- Enicmus caviceps Broun, 1893
- Enicmus claviger Johnson, 1977
- Enicmus cordatus Belon, 1895
- Enicmus crassipunctatus Fall, 1899
- Enicmus denticollis (A.M. Lea, 1906)
- Enicmus dubius (Mannerheim, 1844)
- Enicmus duplicatus LeConte, 1878
- Enicmus fictus Fall, 1899
- Enicmus floridus Brown, 1880
- Enicmus foveatus Belon, 1884
- Enicmus fungicola C. G. Thomson, 1868
- Enicmus guatemalenus Sharp, 1902
- Enicmus histrio Joy & Tomlin, 1910
- Enicmus kamtschaticus Motschulsky, 1866
- Enicmus kaszabi Rücker, 1983
- Enicmus laeviventris Fall, 1899
- Enicmus lundbladi Palm, 1956
- Enicmus maculatus Le Conte, 1878
- Enicmus mannerheimi (Kolenati, 1846)
- Enicmus mendax Fall, 1899
- Enicmus mimus Fall, 1899
- Enicmus montanoasiaticus Saluk, 1995
- Enicmus pampicola Brethes, 1922
- Enicmus planipennis Strand, 1940
- Enicmus priopterus (Broun, 1886)
- Enicmus puncticeps Broun, 1886
- Enicmus recticollis Motschulsky, 1886
- Enicmus rueckeri Johnson, 2007
- Enicmus rufifrons Broun, 1914
- Enicmus rugosus (Herbst, 1793)
- Enicmus sharpi Belon, 1884
- Enicmus strenuus Fall, 1899
- Enicmus sulcatulus Fall, 1899
- Enicmus tenuicornis Le Conte, 1878
- Enicmus testaceus (Stephens, 1830)
- Enicmus transversithorax Dajoz, 1967
- Enicmus transversus (Olivier, 1790)
- Enicmus ussuricus Saluk, 1992
- Enicmus vanus Fall, 1899
- Enicmus varendorffi Reitter, 1903
- Enicmus ventralis Fall, 1899

Fossil species include:

- Enicmus adrianae
