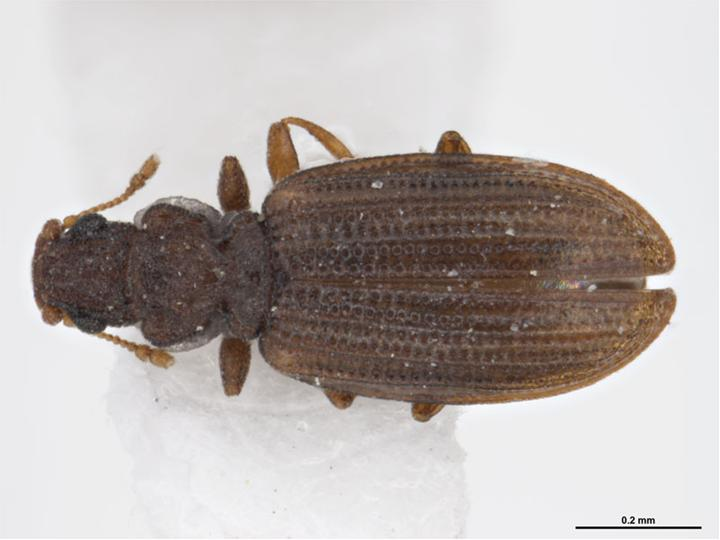
- Cartodere constricta

Scientific classification
- Kingdom: Animalia
- Phylum: Arthropoda
- Class: Insecta
- Order: Coleoptera
- Suborder: Polyphaga
- Infraorder: Cucujiformia
- Family: Latridiidae
- Subfamily: Latridiinae
- Genus: Cartodere; C. G. Thomson, 1859

= Cartodere =

Genus of beetles

Cartodere is a genus of beetles in the family Latridiidae.

== Description ==
Beetles of genus Cartodere have the pronotum margins deeply incised, eyes large with over 70 facets each, elytra with eight or fewer rows of punctate striae, and procoxae separated by a prosternal process.

== Habitat ==
Cartodere occur in stored food products in houses, grain elevators and feed mills. In the wild, they occur in various habitats including herbaceous vegetation, straw, grass, mouldy bark, hay, wood, moss, compost and animal nests.

== Diet ==
Larvae and adults of Cartodere feed on mould in dead organic material.

== Distribution ==
Cartodere can be found worldwide, i.e. the genus has a cosmopolitan distribution.

== Species ==
- C. apfelbecki (Reitter, 1901)
- C. australica (Belon, 1887)
- C. bifasciata (Reitter, 1877)
- C. brasiliensis Dajoz, 1974
- C. carinatus Rücker, 1989
- C. ceylanicus Dajoz, 1975
- C. chilensis Dajoz, 1967
- C. constricta (Gyllenhal, 1827)
- C. costatipennis (Blackburn, 1888)
- C. costatus (Erichson, 1842)
- C. curtipennis Pic
- C. delamarei Dajoz, 1962
- C. dimidiatus (Belon, 1885)
- C. dromedarius (Belon, 1883)
- C. gayi Dajoz, 1970
- C. grouvellei (Belon, 1895)
- C. heteronotus (Belon, 1891)
- C. humeralis (Belon, 1885)
- C. indicus Motschulsky, 1866
- C. jantaricus (Borowiec, 1985)
- C. kulickae (Borowiec, 1985)
- C. latumeris Rücker, 1979
- C. lobli Dajoz, 1975
- C. longiceps (Belon, 1889)
- C. malouinensis Champion, 1918
- C. minor (Blackburn, 1888)
- C. montuosus Rücker, 1985
- C. necessarius Rücker, 1985
- C. nodifer (Westwood, 1839)
- C. peruvianus Dajoz, 1975
- C. satelles (Blackburn, 1888)
- C. semicostatus (Blackburn, 1888)
- C. setulosus (Belon, 1882)
- C. simoni (Belon, 1889)
- C. strangulatus (Mannerheim, 1853)
- C. subfasciatus (Reitter, 1877)
- C. trifasciatus (Belon, 1895)
- C. vannideki Rücker, 2004
- C. ventanensis Dajoz, 1974
- C. vietnamensis Rücker, 1979
- C. ypirangae Dajoz, 1974
