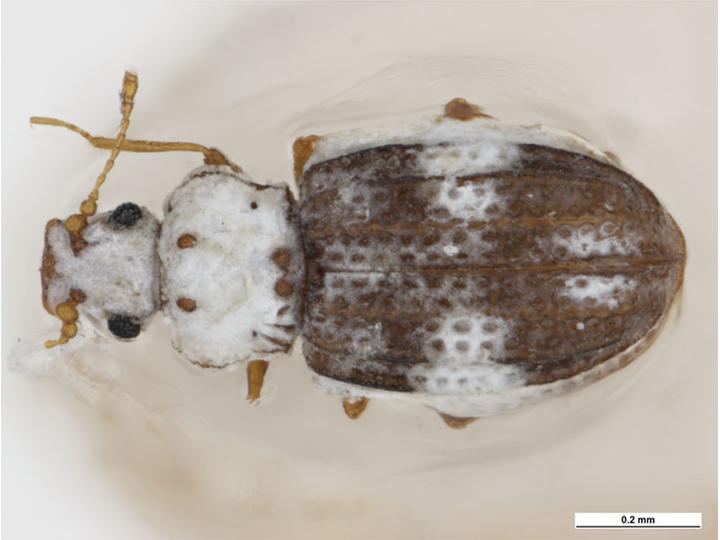

Scientific classification
- Kingdom: Animalia
- Phylum: Arthropoda
- Class: Insecta
- Order: Coleoptera
- Suborder: Polyphaga
- Infraorder: Cucujiformia
- Family: Latridiidae
- Genus: Euchionellus; Reitter, 1908
- Species: E. zanzibaricus

Binomial name
- Euchionellus zanzibaricus (Belon, 1887)

= Euchionellus =

Euchionellus zanzibaricus

Genus of beetles

Euchionellus zanzibaricus is a species of beetle in the family Latridiidae, the only species in the genus Euchionellus.
