= Besuchetia =

Besuchetia ceylanica

Scientific classification
- Kingdom: Animalia
- Phylum: Arthropoda
- Class: Insecta
- Order: Coleoptera
- Suborder: Polyphaga
- Infraorder: Cucujiformia
- Family: Latridiidae
- Genus: Besuchetia; Dajoz, 1975
- Species: B. ceylanica

Binomial name
- Besuchetia ceylanica Dajoz, 1975

Species of beetle

Besuchetia ceylanica is a species of beetles in the family Latridiidae, the only species in the genus Besuchetia.
