= Eufalloides =

Eufalloides holmesi

Scientific classification
- Kingdom: Animalia
- Phylum: Arthropoda
- Class: Insecta
- Order: Coleoptera
- Suborder: Polyphaga
- Infraorder: Cucujiformia
- Family: Latridiidae
- Genus: Eufalloides; Hinton, 1941
- Species: E. holmesi

Binomial name
- Eufalloides holmesi Hinton, 1941

Genus of beetles

Eufalloides holmesi is a species of beetles in the family Latridiidae, the only species in the genus Eufalloides.
