= Austrophthalma =

Austrophthalma raffrayi

Scientific classification
- Kingdom: Animalia
- Phylum: Arthropoda
- Class: Insecta
- Order: Coleoptera
- Suborder: Polyphaga
- Infraorder: Cucujiformia
- Family: Latridiidae
- Genus: Austrophthalma; Dajoz, 1966
- Species: A. raffrayi

Binomial name
- Austrophthalma raffrayi Dajoz, 1966

Genus of beetles

Austrophthalma raffrayi is a species of beetle in the family Latridiidae, the only species in the genus Austrophthalma.
