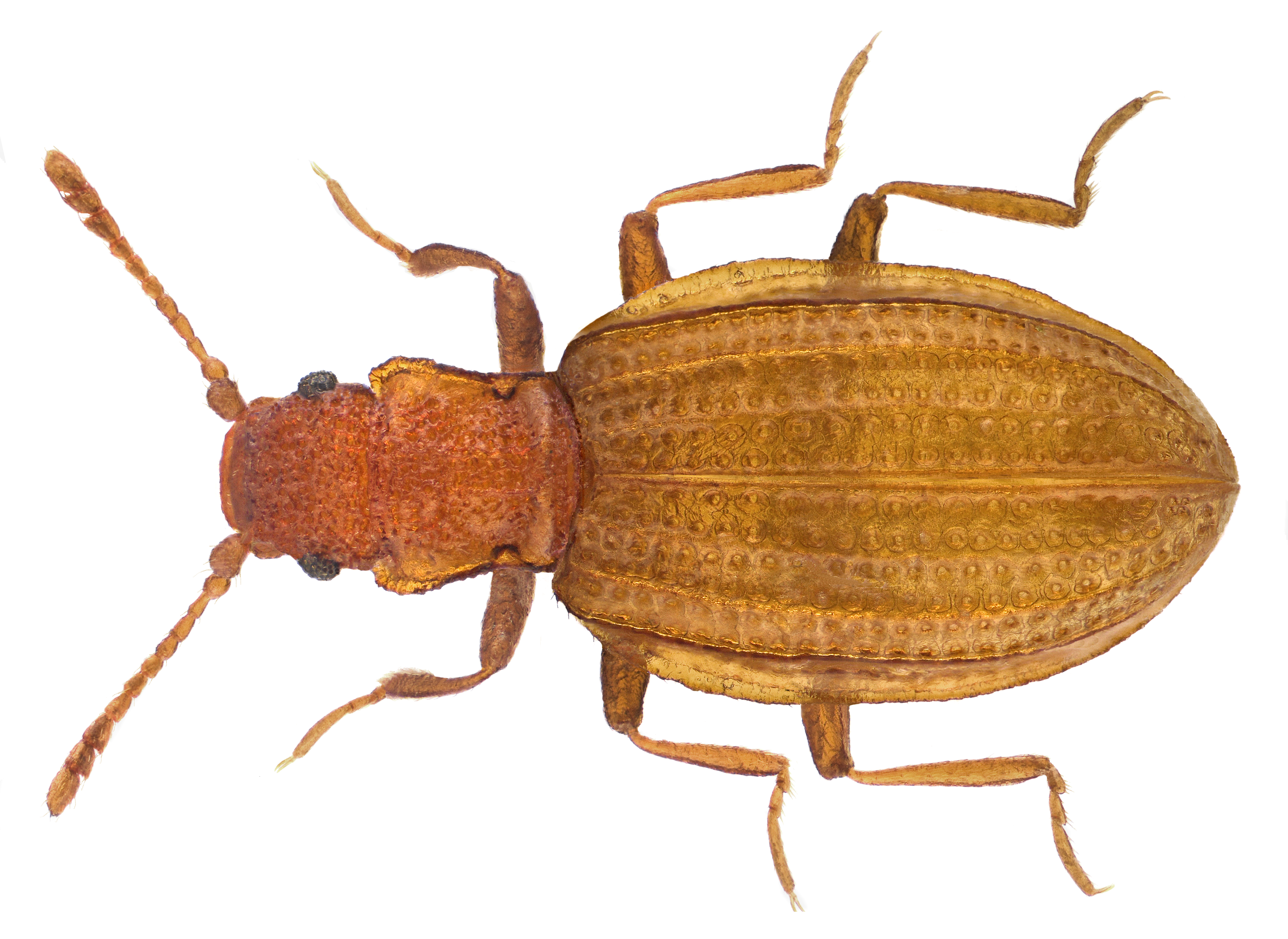
- Thes bergrothi

Scientific classification
- Kingdom: Animalia
- Phylum: Arthropoda
- Class: Insecta
- Order: Coleoptera
- Suborder: Polyphaga
- Infraorder: Cucujiformia
- Family: Latridiidae
- Genus: Thes; Straneo, 1939

= Thes =

Genus of beetles

Thes is a genus of beetles in the family Latridiidae, containing the following species:

- Thes bergrothi (Reitter, 1881)
- Thes laeviventris (Fall, 1899)
