= Rethusus =

Scientific classification
- Kingdom: Animalia
- Phylum: Arthropoda
- Class: Insecta
- Order: Coleoptera
- Suborder: Polyphaga
- Infraorder: Cucujiformia
- Family: Latridiidae
- Genus: Rethusus; Broun, 1886

Genus of beetles

Rethusus is a genus of beetles in the family Latridiidae, containing the following species:

- Rethusus fulvescens Broun, 1921
- Rethusus lachrymosus Broun, 1885
- Rethusus pictulus Broun, 1886
- Rethusus pustulosus (Belon, 1884)
