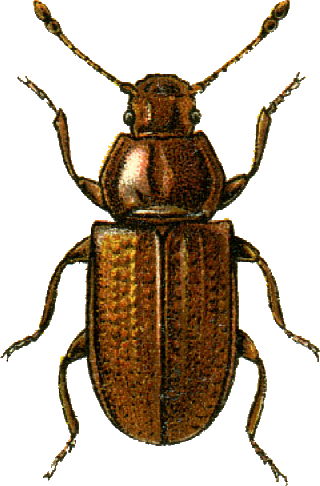

Scientific classification
- Kingdom: Animalia
- Phylum: Arthropoda
- Class: Insecta
- Order: Coleoptera
- Suborder: Polyphaga
- Infraorder: Cucujiformia
- Family: Latridiidae
- Genus: Metophthalmus; Motschulsky, 1850

= Metophthalmus =

Genus of beetles

Metophthalmus is a genus of beetles in the family Latridiidae.

== Species ==
- Metophthalmus achilles Rücker & Reike, 2010
- Metophthalmus albosignatus Fall, 1899
- Metophthalmus americanus Motschulsky, 1866
- Metophthalmus asperatus Wollaston, 1854
- Metophthalmus bicolor Belon, 1895
- Metophthalmus capensis Belon, 1898
- Metophthalmus carinatus Otto, 1978
- Metophthalmus clareae Johnson, 1973
- Metophthalmus encaustus Wollaston, 1865
- Metophthalmus exiguus Wollaston, 1860
- Metophthalmus ferrugineus Wollaston, 1865
- Metophthalmus fulvus Reike & Rücker, 2010
- Metophthalmus genae Otto, 1978
- Metophthalmus haigi Andrews, 1976
- Metophthalmus hispanicus Reitter, 1908
- Metophthalmus hispidus Belon, 1895
- Metophthalmus humeridens Reitter, 1884
- Metophthalmus hungaricus Reitter, 1884
- Metophthalmus iviei Andrews, 1988
- Metophthalmus judaicus Sahlberg, 1913
- Metophthalmus kabylianus Chobaut, 1906
- Metophthalmus kanei Andrews, 1976
- Metophthalmus lacteolus Motschulsky, 1866
- Metophthalmus longipilis Otto, 1978
- Metophthalmus menelaos Rücker & Reike, 2010
- Metophthalmus muchmorei Andrews, 1988
- Metophthalmus niveicollis Jacquelin du Val, 1859
- Metophthalmus obscurus Reike & Rücker, 2010
- Metophthalmus occidentalis Israelson, 1984
- Metophthalmus parviceps LeConte, 1855
- Metophthalmus peringueyi Belon, 1898
- Metophthalmus proximus Reitter, 1908
- Metophthalmus raffrayi Belon, 1885
- Metophthalmus ragusae Reitter, 1875
- Metophthalmus rudis Fall, 1899
- Metophthalmus sandersoni Andrews, 1976
- Metophthalmus sculpturatus Wollaston, 1862
- Metophthalmus septemstriatus Hatch, 1962
- Metophthalmus solarii Binaghi, 1946
- Metophthalmus telemachos Rücker & Reike, 2010
- Metophthalmus trux Fall, 1899
