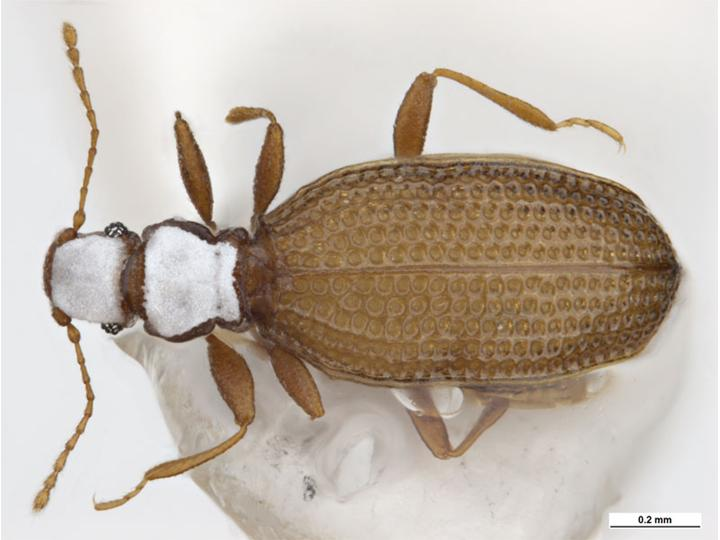
- Eufallia seminivea

Scientific classification
- Kingdom: Animalia
- Phylum: Arthropoda
- Class: Insecta
- Order: Coleoptera
- Suborder: Polyphaga
- Infraorder: Cucujiformia
- Family: Latridiidae
- Genus: Eufallia; Muttkowski, 1900

= Eufallia =

Genus of beetles

Eufallia is a genus of beetles in the family Latridiidae, containing the following species:

- Eufallia africanus (Dajoz, 1970)
- Eufallia seminivea (Motschulsky, 1866)
