= Paracaria =

Paracaria pilosa

Scientific classification
- Kingdom: Animalia
- Phylum: Arthropoda
- Class: Insecta
- Order: Coleoptera
- Suborder: Polyphaga
- Infraorder: Cucujiformia
- Family: Latridiidae
- Genus: Paracaria; Dajoz, 1970
- Species: P. pilosa

Binomial name
- Paracaria pilosa Dajoz, 1970

Genus of beetles

Paracaria pilosa is a species of beetles in the family Latridiidae, the only species in the genus Paracaria.
