= Fuchsina =

Scientific classification
- Kingdom: Animalia
- Phylum: Arthropoda
- Class: Insecta
- Order: Coleoptera
- Suborder: Polyphaga
- Infraorder: Cucujiformia
- Family: Latridiidae
- Genus: Fuchsina; Fall, 1899

Genus of beetles

Fuchsina is a genus of beetles in the family Latridiidae, containing the following species:

- Fuchsina arida Andrews, 1976
- Fuchsina occulta Fall, 1899
