= Mumfordia =

Scientific classification
- Kingdom: Animalia
- Phylum: Arthropoda
- Class: Insecta
- Order: Coleoptera
- Suborder: Polyphaga
- Infraorder: Cucujiformia
- Family: Latridiidae
- Genus: Mumfordia; Van Dyke, 1932

Genus of beetles

Mumfordia is a genus of beetles in the family Latridiidae, containing the following species:

- Mumfordia monticola E.C. Zimmerman, 1935
- Mumfordia spinata Van Dyke, 1932
