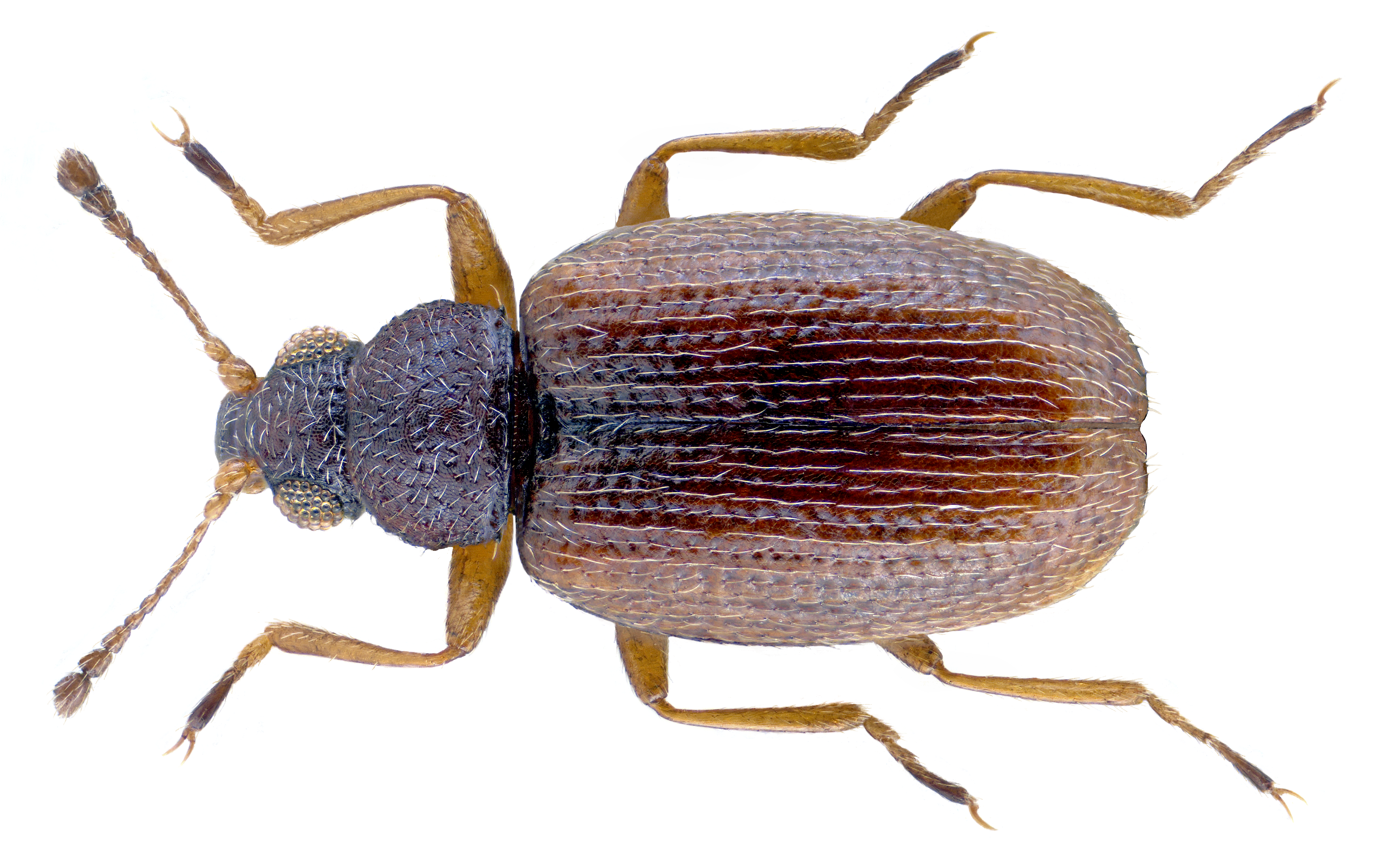
- Melanophthalma suturalis

Scientific classification
- Kingdom: Animalia
- Phylum: Arthropoda
- Class: Insecta
- Order: Coleoptera
- Suborder: Polyphaga
- Infraorder: Cucujiformia
- Family: Latridiidae
- Genus: Melanophthalma; Motschulsky, 1866

= Melanophthalma =

Genus of beetles

Melanophthalma is a genus of beetles in the family Latridiidae, containing the following species:

- Melanophthalma aculifera Fall, 1899
- Melanophthalma aegyptiaca Otto, 1978
- Melanophthalma algirina Motschulsky, 1866
- Melanophthalma americana (Mannerheim, 1844)
- Melanophthalma andrewi Rücker & Johnson 2007
- Melanophthalma angulata (Wollaston, 1871)
- Melanophthalma angulicollis Motschulsky, 1866
- Melanophthalma arabiensis Otto, 1979
- Melanophthalma arborea Rücker, 1981
- Melanophthalma argentea Rücker, 1984
- Melanophthalma atripennis Rücker, 1987
- Melanophthalma australis Dajoz, 1967
- Melanophthalma basicollis Motschulsky, 1866
- Melanophthalma bicolor Wollaston, 1867
- Melanophthalma bifurculata Rücker, 1980
- Melanophthalma birmana Belon, 1891
- Melanophthalma brevilata Rücker, 1981
- Melanophthalma brevis Mika, 2000
- Melanophthalma brincki Dajoz, 1970
- Melanophthalma broadheadi Rücker, 1981
- Melanophthalma cantabrica Otto, 1978
- Melanophthalma casta Fall, 1899
- Melanophthalma castaneipennis Rücker, 1987
- Melanophthalma chamaeropis Fall, 1899
- Melanophthalma chumphonica Míka, 2000
- Melanophthalma claudiae Rücker & Kahlen, 2008
- Melanophthalma complanata Motschulsky, 1866
- Melanophthalma concameratus Rücker, 1985
- Melanophthalma consobrina Rücker, 1987
- Melanophthalma corusca Rücker, 1981
- Melanophthalma crebra Míka, 2000
- Melanophthalma crinifera Rücker, 1987
- Melanophthalma demoulini Dajoz, 1970
- Melanophthalma dentata Dajoz, 1970
- Melanophthalma denticulata Rücker, 1987
- Melanophthalma dewittei Dajoz, 1970
- Melanophthalma difficilis Rücker, 1981
- Melanophthalma dilitata Dajoz, 1970
- Melanophthalma distinguenda (Comolli, 1837)
- Melanophthalma dubia Dajoz, 1970
- Melanophthalma endroedyi Rücker, 1984
- Melanophthalma evansi Johnson, 1972
- Melanophthalma extensa Rey, 1889
- Melanophthalma flavicula Motschulsky, 1866
- Melanophthalma floridana Fall, 1899
- Melanophthalma fluctuosa Rücker, 1981
- Melanophthalma foersteri Rücker, 1987
- Melanophthalma franzi Johnson, 1972
- Melanophthalma fuscipennis (Mannerheim, 1844)
- Melanophthalma gomyi Dajoz, 1972
- Melanophthalma grouvellei Belon, 1899
- Melanophthalma helvola Motschulsky, 1866
- Melanophthalma horaci Míka, 2000
- Melanophthalma horioni Rücker, 1987
- Melanophthalma iguacuis Rücker, 1985
- Melanophthalma immatura Wollaston, 1867
- Melanophthalma inermis Motschulsky, 1866
- Melanophthalma inflexa Rücker, 1979
- Melanophthalma inornata Sharp, 1902
- Melanophthalma insularis Fall, 1899
- Melanophthalma japonica Johnson, 1976
- Melanophthalma keleinikovae Rücker, 1981
- Melanophthalma klapperichi Rücker, 1984
- Melanophthalma lohsei Rücker, 1987
- Melanophthalma majeri Míka, 2000
- Melanophthalma malaysica Míka, 2000
- Melanophthalma maura Motschulsky, 1866
- Melanophthalma melina Rücker, 1987
- Melanophthalma mexicana Dajoz, 1970
- Melanophthalma minutula Rücker, 1981
- Melanophthalma montivaga Rücker, 1987
- Melanophthalma nidicola Grouvelle, 1909
- Melanophthalma nitida Rücker, 1978
- Melanophthalma nodosus Rücker, 1984
- Melanophthalma obliqua Rücker, 1985
- Melanophthalma obliterata Wollaston, 1867
- Melanophthalma ophthalmica Dajoz, 1970
- Melanophthalma pallens (Mannerheim, 1844)
- Melanophthalma panamanensis Rücker, 1981
- Melanophthalma parvicollis (Mannerheim, 1844)
- Melanophthalma penai Rücker, 1978
- Melanophthalma phragmiteticola Franz, 1967
- Melanophthalma picina Motschulsky, 1866
- Melanophthalma picta (Le Conte, 1855)
- Melanophthalma pilosa Rücker, 1978
- Melanophthalma pilosaformis Rücker, 1981
- Melanophthalma pilosella Motschulsky, 1866
- Melanophthalma placida Sharp, 1902
- Melanophthalma plicatulus Reitter, 1877
- Melanophthalma proximulata Rücker, 1980
- Melanophthalma prudeki Mika, 2000
- Melanophthalma pumila (Le Conte, 1855)
- Melanophthalma ranongica Míka, 2000
- Melanophthalma rectusa Rücker, 1984
- Melanophthalma redunculata Rücker, 1981
- Melanophthalma remota Sharp, 1902
- Melanophthalma retroculis Motschulsky, 1866
- Melanophthalma rhenana Rücker & Johnson, 2007
- Melanophthalma rispini Rücker & Johnson, 2007
- Melanophthalma rostrata Rücker, 1981
- Melanophthalma rothschildi Pic, 1908
- Melanophthalma rubi Rücker, 1987
- Melanophthalma rugifera Rücker, 1987
- Melanophthalma russula Motschulsky, 1866
- Melanophthalma sagitta Rücker, 1984
- Melanophthalma sakagutii Johnson, 1976
- Melanophthalma scitula Rücker, 1987
- Melanophthalma seminigra Belon, 1885
- Melanophthalma sericea (Mannerheim, 1844)
- Melanophthalma similis Míka, 2000
- Melanophthalma simplex Fall, 1899
- Melanophthalma simpliata Rücker, 1980
- Melanophthalma solitaria Rücker, 1987
- Melanophthalma subornata Rücker, 1987
- Melanophthalma subvillosa Johnson, 1972
- Melanophthalma suturalis (Mannerheim, 1844)
- Melanophthalma synavei Dajoz, 1970
- Melanophthalma taurica (Mannerheim, 1844)
- Melanophthalma transversalis (Gyllenhal, 1827)
- Melanophthalma unidentata Rücker, 1981
- Melanophthalma valida Rücker, 1978
- Melanophthalma venusta Rücker, 1987
- Melanophthalma videns Otto, 1979
- Melanophthalma villosa Zimmermann, 1869
- Melanophthalma wittmeri Otto, 1978
