= Revelieria =

Scientific classification
- Kingdom: Animalia
- Phylum: Arthropoda
- Class: Insecta
- Order: Coleoptera
- Suborder: Polyphaga
- Infraorder: Cucujiformia
- Family: Latridiidae
- Genus: Revelieria; Perris, 1869

Genus of beetles

Revelieria is a genus of beetles in the family Latridiidae, containing the following species:

- Revelieria california Fall, 1899
- Revelieria genei (Aube, 1850)
