= Bicava =

Scientific classification
- Kingdom: Animalia
- Phylum: Arthropoda
- Class: Insecta
- Order: Coleoptera
- Suborder: Polyphaga
- Infraorder: Cucujiformia
- Family: Latridiidae
- Genus: Bicava; Belon, 1884

Genus of beetles

Bicava is a genus of beetles in the family Latridiidae.

== Species ==
- Bicava alacris (Broun, 1880)
- Bicava amplipennis (Broun, 1893)
- Bicava angusticollis (Broun, 1880)
- Bicava castanea (Broun, 1914)
- Bicava discoidea (Broun, 1880)
- Bicava diversicollis (Belon, 1884)
- Bicava erythrocephala (Broun, 1886)
- Bicava fauveli Belon, 1885
- Bicava fulgurita Belon, 1884
- Bicava fusca (Broun, 1886)
- Bicava fuscicollis (Broun, 1912)
- Bicava gilvipes (Broun, 1886)
- Bicava globipennis (Reitter, 1881)
- Bicava illustris (Reitter, 1879)
- Bicava obesa (Broun, 1880)
- Bicava picturata Belon, 1884
- Bicava platyptera (Broun, 1886)
- Bicava pubera (Broun, 1880)
- Bicava pudibunda (Broun, 1880)
- Bicava semirufa (Broun, 1886)
- Bicava sharpi Belon, 1884
- Bicava splendens (Reitter, 1879)
- Bicava terricola Broun, 1893
- Bicava unicolor (Broun, 1914)
- Bicava variegata (Broun, 1880)
- Bicava zelandica (Belon, 1884
