= Corticaromus =

Corticaromus rueckeri

Scientific classification
- Kingdom: Animalia
- Phylum: Arthropoda
- Class: Insecta
- Order: Coleoptera
- Suborder: Polyphaga
- Infraorder: Cucujiformia
- Family: Latridiidae
- Genus: Corticaromus; Tarun K. Pal & Shelley Ghosh, 2008
- Species: C. rueckeri

Binomial name
- Corticaromus rueckeri Tarun K. Pal & Shelley Ghosh, 2008

Genus of beetles

Corticaromus rueckeri is a species of beetles in the family Latridiidae, the only species in the genus Corticaromus.
