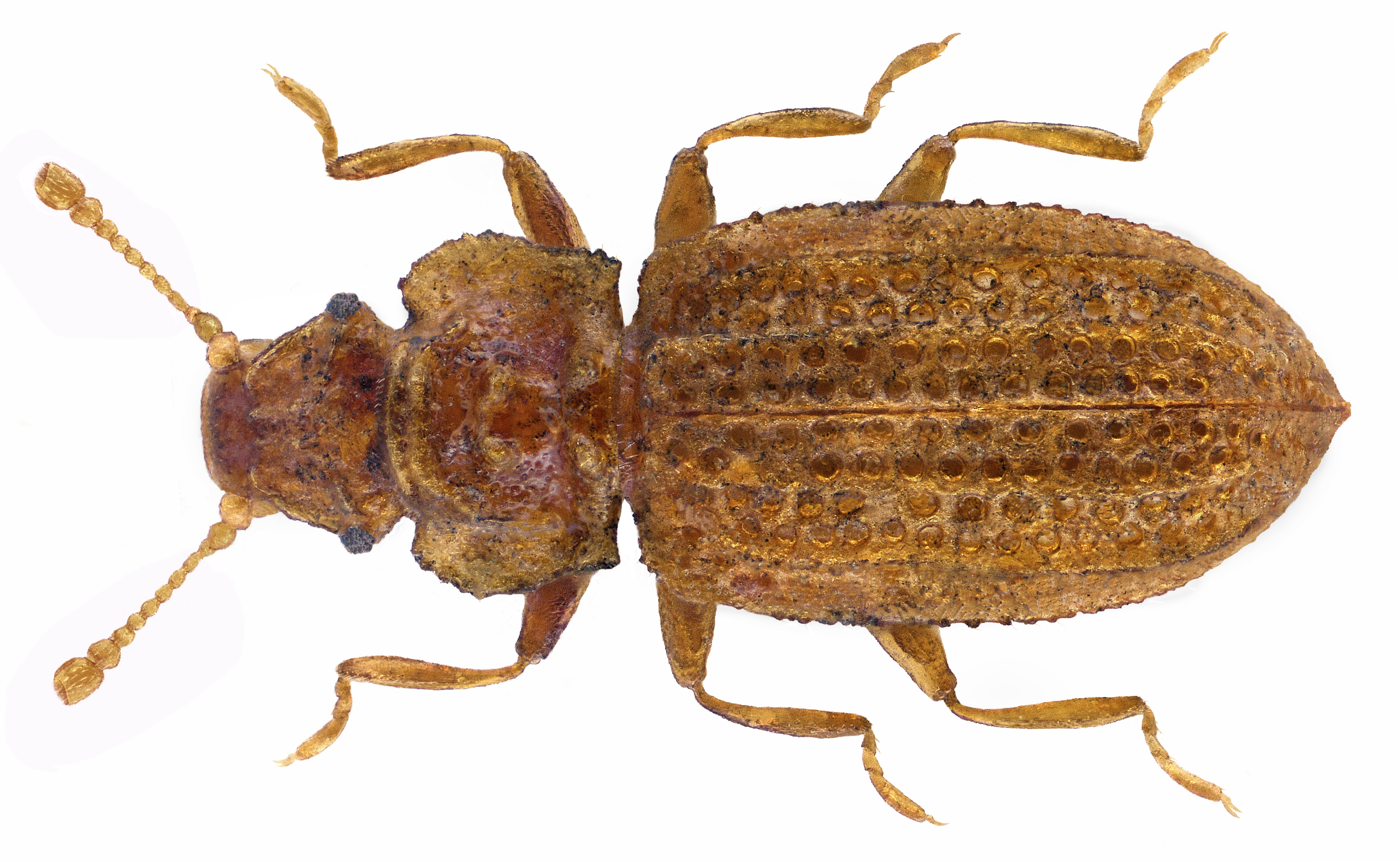

Scientific classification
- Kingdom: Animalia
- Phylum: Arthropoda
- Clade: Pancrustacea
- Class: Insecta
- Order: Coleoptera
- Suborder: Polyphaga
- Infraorder: Cucujiformia
- Family: Latridiidae
- Genus: Lithostygnus; Broun, 1886

= Lithostygnus =

Genus of beetles

Lithostygnus is a genus of beetles in the family Latridiidae, containing the following species:

- Lithostygnus cuneiceps Broun, 1914
- Lithostygnus serripennis Broun, 1914
- Lithostygnus sinuosus (Belon, 1884)
