= Nalpaumia =

Nalpaumia septemstriata

Scientific classification
- Kingdom: Animalia
- Phylum: Arthropoda
- Class: Insecta
- Order: Coleoptera
- Suborder: Polyphaga
- Infraorder: Cucujiformia
- Family: Latridiidae
- Genus: Nalpaumia; Dajoz, 1967
- Species: N. septemstriata

Binomial name
- Nalpaumia septemstriata Dajoz, 1967

Genus of beetles

Nalpaumia septemstriata is a species of beetle in the family Latridiidae, the only species in the genus Nalpaumia.
