= Herfordia (beetle) =

Herfordia elegans

Scientific classification
- Kingdom: Animalia
- Phylum: Arthropoda
- Class: Insecta
- Order: Coleoptera
- Suborder: Polyphaga
- Infraorder: Cucujiformia
- Family: Latridiidae
- Genus: Herfordia; Halstead, 1967
- Species: H. elegans

Binomial name
- Herfordia elegans Halstead, 1967

Genus of beetles

Herfordia elegans is a species of beetle in the family Latridiidae, the only species in the genus Herfordia.
