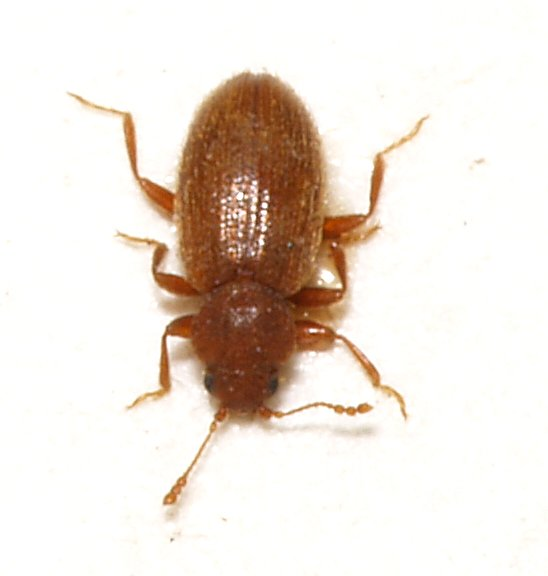
- undetermined species

Scientific classification
- Kingdom: Animalia
- Phylum: Arthropoda
- Class: Insecta
- Order: Coleoptera
- Suborder: Polyphaga
- Infraorder: Cucujiformia
- Superfamily: Coccinelloidea
- Family: Latridiidae; Erichson, 1842

Subfamilies
- Corticariinae; Latridiinae †Tetrameropsinae

Synonyms
- Corticariidae; Lathridiidae; Melanophthalmidae

= Latridiidae =

Latridiidae Temporal range: Barremian–Recent

Family of beetles

Latridiidae (sometimes spelled "Lathridiidae") is a family of tiny, little-known beetles commonly called minute brown scavenger beetles or fungus beetles. The number of described species currently stands at around 1050 in 29 genera but the number of species is undoubtedly much higher than this and increases each time a new estimate is made.

== Description ==
Adult beetles in this family are some shade of brown and between 1.2 and 2 mm (0.05 and 0.08 in) in length. The antennae have eight to eleven segments, the terminal one to three segments forming a club. The elytra are wider than the head and thorax, and are punctured by rows of small pits. The dorsal surface is rough. Most species are unable to fly.

A characteristic separating latridiids from other beetles is that each leg ends in a tarsus with three segments (tarsal formula 3–3–3).

The two subfamilies of latridiids differ from each other in appearance. Latridiinae are glabrous, rarely have erect setae, their dorsal surfaces are often heavily sculptured, and the pronotal side margin is usually smooth. Corticariinae are finely pubescent, usually have recumbent setae, their dorsal surfaces never have heavy sculpture, and the pronotal side margin is usually serrate.

== Ecology ==
These beetles and their larvae are obligate feeders on the hyphae and spores of fungi, moulds and mildews. They occur in damp places where such fungi are found, under bark, in leaf litter, in decaying plant material, in timber stacked outdoors, and in ant and termite nests. They may be present in ripening cereal crops but will not persist in clean, dry stored grain; however damp grain, or grain heavily contaminated by other insects, will support them.

They may infest brewers yeast and contaminate food by introducing mould spores. Species of Dienerella have caused the deterioration of foodstuffs, and hygiene problems in a hospital have been linked to Dienerella filum. They have been shown to consume Ustilago, Arcticum, Polysaccum, Tilletia, Lycoperdon and Trichothecium. They also thrive on mixed cultures of Penicillium, Mucor, Botrytis and Aspergillus.

== Genera ==
- Subfamily Latridiinae Erichson 1842
  - Adistemia Fall 1899
  - †Archelatrius Kirejtshuk & Azar 2009 Lebanese amber, Early Cretaceous (Barremian)
  - Besuchetia Dajoz 1975
  - Cartodere Thomson 1859
  - Dicastria Dajoz 1967
  - Dienerella Reitter 1911
  - Enicmus Thomson 1859
  - Euchionellus Reitter 1908
  - Eufallia Muttkowski 1910
  - Eufalloides Hinton 1941
  - Herfordia Halstead 1967
  - Latridius Herbst 1793
  - Lithostygnus Broun 1886
  - Metophthalmoides Dajoz 1967
  - Metophthalmus Motschulsky 1850
  - Mumfordia van Dyke 1935
  - Nalpaumia Dajoz 1976
  - Revelieria Perris 1869
  - Stephostethus LeConte 1878
  - Thes Semenov Tian-Shansky 1910
- Subfamily Corticariinae Curtis 1829
  - Austrophthalma Dajoz 1966
  - Bicava Belon 1884
  - Corticaria Marsham 1802
  - Corticarina Reitter 1881
  - †Corticariites Kirejtshuk 2019 Bembridge Marls, United Kingdom, Eocene (Priabonian)
  - Corticaromus Pal & Ghosh 2007
  - Cortinicara Johnson 1975
  - Fuchsina Fall 1899
  - Melanophthalma Motschulsky 1866
  - Migneauxia Jacquelin du Val 1859
  - Paracaria Dajoz 1970
  - Rethusus Broun 1886
  - †Succinimontia Zherikhin 1977 Taimyr amber, Russia, Late Cretaceous (Santonian)
