= Herford (disambiguation) =

Herford is a town in North Rhine-Westphalia, Germany.

Herford may also refer to:

- Herford (district), a district in North Rhine-Westphalia
- Herford-Himmighausen railway
- Herford – Minden-Lübbecke II
- Herford station, a railway station in Herford
- Herford (surname)
- MV Herford, a 1996 cargo ship
- SC Herford, a German football team

== See also ==
- Herfordia (disambiguation)
- Hereford (disambiguation)
- Hendford (disambiguation)
- Headford, County Galway, Ireland
