= Mary A. B. Herford =

Academic (d. 1983)

Mary Antonia Beatrice Braunholtz (née Herford, died 1983) was a lecturer in Classical Archaeology at the University of Manchester.

== Education ==
She studied at both the University of Manchester and Somerville College, Oxford.

== Career ==
She was an Assistant in Classics at the University of Manchester from September 29th 1914 for 2 years. She was a Junior Assistant Lecturer in Classics at the University of Manchester from 29th Sept 1916 for the duration of World War I.

In 1919, she published A Handbook of Greek Vase Painting to meet the need for an introduction to the subject aimed at students and non-specialists.

In 1921, from May until July, she participated in excavations at Mycenae with the British School at Athens, working on excavations of the Ramp House, the Palace, the South House and the House of the Warrior Vase.

She was a Lecturer in Classical Archaeology at the University of Manchester from 29th September 1921 until 1924.

== Personal life ==
She was the daughter of C. H. Herford (1853-1931), an English literary scholar and critic, and Anna Herford. She also had one brother, Siegfried Wedgwood Herford (1891-1916), a British climber active before World War I. She married Gustav Ernst Karl Braunholtz (1887-1967), a Professor of Comparative Philology at Oxford, and they had two children together. She died July 28th 1983.

== Publications ==
1. A Handbook of Greek Vase Painting (1919)
