= Herford (surname) =

Herford is a surname. Notable people with the surname include:

- Beatrice Herford (1868–1952), American actor
- C. H. Herford (1853–1931), English literary scholar
- Ethilda Herford (1872–1956), English gynaecologist and psychoanalyst
- Geoffrey Herford (1905–2000), British entomologist
- Heinrich von Herford (c.1300–1370), Dominican friar and chronicler
- Henry Herford (born 1947), Scottish baritone
- Laura Herford (1831–1870), British painter
- Jay Herford (born 1987), American soccer player
- Oliver Herford (1863–1935), American writer
- R. Travers Herford (1860–1950), British Unitarian minister
- Siegfried Herford (1891–1916), British climber
