= John Harford =

John Harford may refer to:

- John Harford (MP) for Coventry (UK Parliament constituency)
- John Scandrett Harford, British banker, benefactor and abolitionist
- Sir John Charles Harford, 1st Baronet (1860–1934), of the Harford baronets
- Sir (John) Timothy Harford, 3rd Baronet (1932–2010), of the Harford baronets
- John Harford, birth name of John Hartford (1937–2001), American folk, country, and bluegrass composer and musician

== See also ==
- Harford (disambiguation)
