= Hartford City =

Hartford City can refer to some places in the United States:

- Hartford City, Indiana
- Hartford City, West Virginia
- Hartford, Connecticut
- Hartford City FC, a soccer team based in Hartford, Connecticut

== See also ==
- Hartford (disambiguation)
