= Olpe High School =

Olpe Junior–Senior High School

Location
- 220 West Listerscheid; Olpe, Kansas 66865; United States
- Coordinates: 38°15.8645′N 96°10.171′W

Information
- Funding type: Public
- Opened: 1953
- Status: Open
- Sister school: Hartford Junior–Senior High School
- School board: BOE website
- School district: Southern Lyon County USD 252
- Superintendent: Ryan Muhlig
- Principal: Julianna Schmid
- Staff: 13.05 (FTE)
- Teaching staff: 13
- Gender: coed
- Enrollment: 156 (2023–2024)
- Average class size: 18
- Student to teacher ratio: 11.95
- Schedule type: Block
- Hours in school day: 7 hours, 15 minutes
- Colors: Green; Gold
- Athletics: Yes
- Athletics conference: Lyon County League
- Sports: Basketball, Cheerleading, Cross Country, Football, Golf, Track and Field, Volleyball
- Mascot: Eagles
- Nickname: Olpe Eagles
- Rival: Hartford High School
- Newspaper: The Eagle Edition
- Yearbook: OHS Yearbook
- Affiliations: KSHSAA
- Athletics Director: Chris Schmidt
- Website: School website

Olpe Junior–Senior High School is a public high school located in Olpe, Kansas, in the Southern Lyon County USD 252 school district, serving students in grades 7–12. Olpe has an enrollment of approximately 160 students and a teaching staff of 15. The principal is Julianna Schmid. The school mascot is the Eagles and the school colors are green and yellow.

== Extracurricular activities ==
The Eagles compete in the Lyon County League. The KSHSAA classification differs each year, switching between 2A or 1A-Div. I, two of the three lowest classes. Throughout its history, Olpe has won several state championships in various sports. Some graduates have gone on to participate in college athletics.

=== Athletics ===
The Eagles compete in the Lyon County League and are classified as either a 2A or 1A-Division I school, two of the lowest classifications in Kansas according to KSHSAA. A majority of the sports are coached by the same coaches. Throughout its history, Olpe High School's athletics have won 13 state championships in various sports.
Olpe Junior–Senior High School offers the following sports:

==== Fall ====
- Boys' Cross Country
- Girls' Cross Country
- Fall Cheerleading
- Football
- Volleyball

==== Winter ====
- Boys' Basketball
- Girls' Basketball
- Winter Cheerleading

==== Spring ====
- Golf (high school only)
- Boys' Track and Field
- Girls' Track and Field

=== High School girls' basketball ===
The Olpe Lady Eagles basketball team has been successful, having won three team state championships in 1981, 2010 and 2011. As of 2013, the Lady Eagles have won 8 straight Lyon County League tournament titles, and 24 overall. The head coach for the Lady Eagles, Jesse Nelson, is the record holder for most wins in Kansas high school history, with 762 wins at the end of the 2012–13 season. Nelson broke the record on Monday, February 6, 2012.

=== Cross country/track & field/volleyball ===
Olpe's girls' cross country team has won the state title 5 times, occurring in 1999, 2000, 2004, 2005, and 2007. Olpe's girls' track and field team has also won the state title 3 times, occurring in 2004, 2010, and 2011, coached by the same head coach, Tom Camien. The boys' track team won their first track and field title in 2016. Plus, Olpe's Volleyball team has won the state title twice, back-to-back, in 2011 and 2012, both in Class 2A and Class 1A-Div. I. The volleyball team was coached by Marilyn Stueve.

=== Golf ===
On Tuesday, May 27, 2014, the Olpe boys' golf team won their first championship, and claimed the school's first boys' state title in school history. State took place at the Fort Hays State Municipal Golf Course, where the team took a score of 318, which means every golfer on the team placed in the top-30.

=== State championships ===
State Championships
Season	Sport	Number of Championships	Year
Fall	Cross Country, Girls	5	1999, 2000, 2004, 2005, and 2007
Fall	Volleyball	2	2010 and 2011
Fall	Football	3	2014, 2020, 2021
Winter	Basketball, Girls	3	1981, 2010, and 2011
Spring	Track and Field, Girls	3	2004, 2010, and 2011
Spring	Track and Field, Boys	1	2016
Spring	Golf	1	2014
Total	6 sports	16 championships	

== See also ==
- List of high schools in Kansas
