= Hartford (disambiguation) =

Hartford is the capital of the U.S. state of Connecticut.

Hartford may also refer to:

== People and fictional characters ==
- Hartford (surname), a list of people and fictional characters
- Hartford N. Gunn Jr. (1927–1986), founding president of the Public Broadcasting Service
- Hartford H. Keifer (1902–1986), American entomologist

== Places ==
=== England ===
- Hartford, Cambridgeshire, a village near Huntingdon
- Hartford, Cheshire, a village and civil parish
- Hartford, Somerset, a hamlet

=== United States ===
- Hartford, Alabama, a city
- Hartford, Arkansas, a city
- Hartford County, Connecticut
  - Hartford, Connecticut, capital city of the state of Connecticut
- Hartford Correctional Center, a correctional facility in Hartford, Connecticut
- Hartford, Georgia, an unincorporated community
- Hartford, Ohio County, Indiana, an unincorporated community
- Hartford City, Indiana, a city
- English, Indiana, a town originally named Hartford
- Hartford, Illinois, a village
- Hartford, Iowa, a city
- Hartford, Kansas, a city
- Hartford, Kentucky, a home rule-class city
- Hartford, Maine, a town
- Hartford, Michigan, a city
- Hartford, Missouri, an unincorporated community
- Hartford, New Jersey, an unincorporated community
- Hartford, New York, a town
- Hartford, Ohio, a village
- Hartford, Trumbull County, Ohio, an unincorporated community
- Hartford, Providence, Rhode Island, a neighborhood
- Hartford, South Dakota, a city
- Hartford, Tennessee, an unincorporated community
- Hartford, Vermont, a town
  - Hartford (village), Vermont, in the town
- Hartford City, West Virginia, also known as Hartford, a town
- Hartford, Wisconsin, a city
- Hartford (town), Wisconsin, neighboring the city
- Hartford Township (disambiguation)
- Archdiocese of Hartford, Connecticut, a Catholic diocese

== Schools ==
- University of Hartford, a private university in West Hartford, Connecticut
- Hartford College of Law, fully merged into the University of Hartford in 1948
- Hartford College for Women, a former two-year private college for women in Hartford, Connecticut, later a constituent college of the University of Hartford, closed in 2003
- Hartford Female Seminary, a former female seminary in Hartford, Connecticut, established in 1823
- Hartford International University for Religion and Peace, a private theological university in Hartford, Connecticut
- Hartford Conservatory, a performing arts school in Hartford, Connecticut, from 1890 to 2011
- Hartford High School (disambiguation)

== Sports ==
- Hartford Americans, an American Soccer League club based in Hartford, Connecticut, for part of the 1927-1928 season
- Hartford Athletic, an American professional soccer team based in Hartford, Connecticut
- Hartford Blues, an American National Football League team in 1926
- Hartford Capitols, an Eastern Professional Basketball League (later re-named the Eastern Basketball Association) team from 1966 through 1974
- Hartford Charter Oaks, a professional football team based in Hartford, Connecticut, from 1964 to 1968
- Hartford Chiefs, Bees and Laurels, names of an American minor league baseball franchise representing Hartford, Connecticut, between 1938 and 1952
- Hartford City FC, an American soccer team based in Hartford, Connecticut
- Hartford Colonials, a United Football League team in 2009 and 2010
- Hartford Dark Blues, a baseball team based in Hartford, Connecticut from 1874 to 1876, and in Brooklyn, New York, in 1877
- Hartford FoxForce, a World TeamTennis professional co-ed tennis team in Connecticut from 1999 to 2007
- Hartford GAA, is a Gaelic games club based in Hartford, Connecticut
- Hartford Hawks, the athletics teams of the University of Hartford
- Hartford Hellions, a Major Indoor Soccer League team based in Hartford, Connecticut, from 1979 to 1981
- Hartford Hurricanes, an American Basketball League team based in Hartford, Connecticut, in the 1947-1948 season
- Hartford Jr. Wolfpack, a junior ice hockey team based in Cromwell, Connecticut, from 2003 to 2019
- Hartford Knights, a professional American football team based in Hartford, Connecticut, from 1968 to 1973
- Hartford Lightning, a minor league basketball team of the American Professional Basketball League in the 2011–2012 season, based in Hartford, Connecticut
- Hartford S.C., an American Soccer League club based in Hartford, Connecticut, from 1964 to 1968
- Hartford Senators, a minor league baseball team based in Hartford, Connecticut, at various times from 1878 to 1934
- Hartford Whalers, a former World Hockey League and National Hockey League team based in Hartford, Connecticut
- Hartford Wolf Pack, a professional ice hockey team based in Hartford, Connecticut
- Hartford Yard Goats, a Minor League Baseball team based in Hartford, Connecticut

== Transportation ==
- Amtrak Hartford Line, a train service run by Amtrak primarily between Springfield, Massachusetts, and New Haven, Connecticut
- Hartford Line, a commuter rail service between New Haven, Connecticut, and Springfield, Massachusetts
- Pope-Hartford, an automobile marque of the Pope Manufacturing Company, an American manufacturer of automobiles between 1904 and 1914
- Hartford Municipal Airport, Hartford, Wisconsin
- Hartford railway station, in the village of Hartford, Cheshire, England

== Other uses ==
- The Hartford Financial Services Group, Inc., a company based in Hartford, Connecticut
- Hartford Steam Boiler Inspection and Insurance Company, a global specialty insurer and reinsurer headquartered in Hartford, Connecticut
- USS Hartford (1858), Admiral David Farragut's flagship in the American Civil War
- USS Hartford (SSN-768), a nuclear-powered fast attack submarine
- Hartford Building (Dallas), a mid-rise skyscraper
- Hartford Limestone, a geologic formation in Kansas

== See also ==
- New Hartford (disambiguation)
- Hartford End, Essex, England, a hamlet
- Harford (disambiguation)
- Hertford (disambiguation)
