= Hartford University =

Hartford University may refer to:

- University of Hartford, Hartford, Connecticut
- One of several unaccredited institutions that have used this name; see list of unaccredited institutions of higher education

== See also ==
- Hartford (disambiguation)
- Hartford Seminary
- Harvard University
