= Hereford (disambiguation) =

Hereford is the county town of Herefordshire. It may also refer to:

== Geography ==
=== United Kingdom ===
- Hereford (UK Parliament constituency) (1295–2010)
- Hereford and South Herefordshire (UK Parliament constituency) (current)
- Little Hereford

=== United States ===
- Hereford, Arizona
- Hereford, Colorado
- Hereford, Maryland
  - Hereford Zone, Maryland
  - Hereford High School (Parkton, Maryland)
- Hereford, Minnesota, ghost town
- Hereford, Missouri
- Hereford, Oregon
- Hereford, Pennsylvania
  - Hereford Township, Pennsylvania, includes the settlement above
- Hereford, South Dakota
- Hereford, Texas
- Hereford, West Virginia

== People ==
- Viscount Hereford, the senior Viscount in the Peerage of England
- Duke of Hereford, an English peer
- Earl of Hereford, an English peer
- Frank Hereford (politician) (1825–1891), American politician
- Frank Hereford (University of Virginia) (1923–2004), American academic
- Ernest H. Hereford (1894–1958), American academic administrator

== Other uses ==
- Hereford (ship), a 1510-ton iron sailing ship
- Hereford cattle, a breed of cattle widely used in temperate areas
- Hereford Corned Beef, a global Brazilian brand of canned bully beef and luncheon meat
- Hereford F.C., current English football club
- Hereford pig, a breed of pig named for resembling the cattle
- Hereford United F.C., former English football club
- Handley Page Hereford, a variant of the Handley Page Hampden bomber
- Siege of Hereford, a 1645 siege during the English Civil War

== See also ==
- Herefords, a town in northern Eswatini
- Herford (disambiguation)
- Hertford (disambiguation)
