= Hendford =

Hendford may refer to:

- a neighbourhood of Yeovil, around Hendford Manor
- Hendford railway station
- West Hendford Cricket Ground

== See also ==
- Hennffordd, Welsh name for Hereford
- Headford
- Herford
