= Detmold station =

Railway station in Detmold, Germany

Detmold
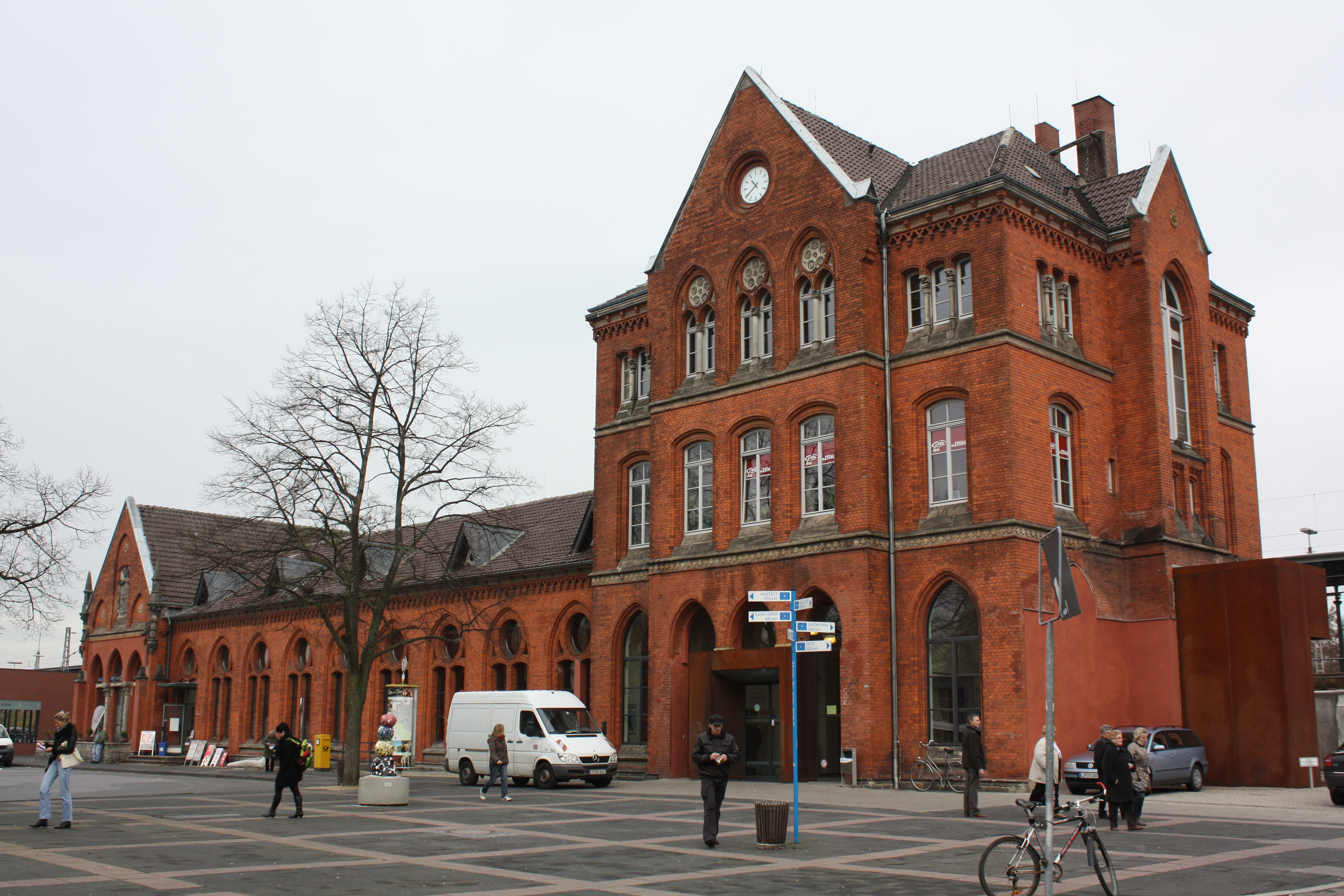

General information
- Location: Bahnhofstr. 8, Detmold, NRW; Germany
- Coordinates: 51°56′27″N 8°52′21″E
- Lines: Herford–Altenbeken (KBS 405)
- Platforms: 2

Construction
- Accessible: Yes

Other information
- Station code: 1180
- DS100 code: EDTM
- IBNR: 8001420
- Category: 5
- Fare zone: Westfalentarif: 65011
- Website: www.bahnhof.de

History
- Opened: 31 December 1880

Services
Preceding station		Following station
Lage (Lippe) towards Bielefeld Hbf	RE 82	Horn-Bad Meinberg towards Altenbeken
Lage (Lippe) towards Paderborn Hbf	RB 72	Horn-Bad Meinberg towards Herford
Location

Detmold Station is the main train station of the city of Detmold in the German state of North Rhine-Westphalia. It was opened in 1880. It is classified by Deutsche Bahn as a category 5 station, and has two platform tracks. The station building was thoroughly renovated in 2006 and 2007.

== Infrastructure ==
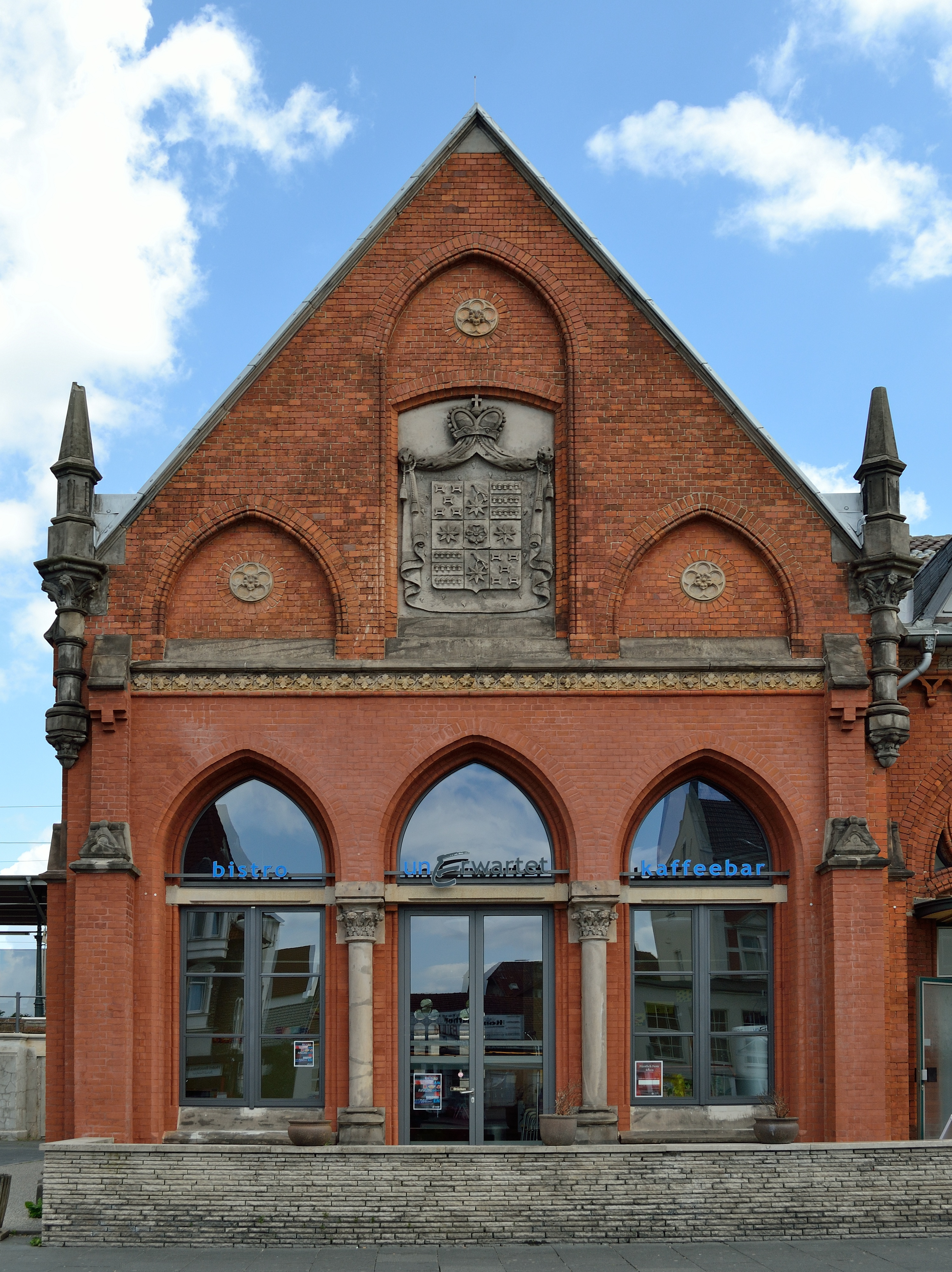
Fürstenzimmer

Detmold station is located northwest of the town centre. It is situated on the Herford–Himmighausen railway, which runs generally from the northwest to the southeast. The station building, which was internally modernised and externally restored in 2007, houses several dining establishments, lockers for luggage and a Deutsche Bahn travel centre. There is a lift to the platform for the disabled. Furthermore, a digital clock with train times has been installed on the platform.

== History ==
The station was served until the 1970s and 1980s by long-distance trains on the Osnabrück/Bielefeld–Altenbeken–Warburg–Kassel. The station forecourt was the transfer point to the former Detmold tramway until 1954.

The city of Detmold bought the entrance building of Detmold station in the summer of 2006 after years of effort and negotiations. In October 2006, the renovation of the building began with funding from the urban development subsidies of the government of North Rhine-Westphalia. The main reasons for the renovation were significant deficiencies in its equipment as well as a lack of access for the disabled. The station was often perceived by citizens and travellers as being "uncomfortable". The station building remained closed during a 14-month period of reconstruction. The inauguration of the renovated building took place in December 2007.

The station's prince's room (Fürstenzimmer, built for royalty during the German Empire) was listed as the monument of the month in Westphalia-Lippe in February 2008.

== Rail services ==
The station is served each hour by the RB 72 (Ostwestfalen-Bahn) and by the RE 82 (Der Leineweber). The RE 82 runs only every two hours on Sundays. The RB 72 is operated by WestfalenBahn with three-part Stadler FLIRT electric multiple units and the RE 82 is operated by Eurobahn with Bombardier Talent diesel multiple units.

Line	Name	Route	Frequency	Operator
RB 72	Ostwestfalen-Bahn	Herford – Lage – Detmold – Altenbeken – Paderborn	60 min	Eurobahn
RE 82	Der Leineweber	Altenbeken – Detmold – Bielefeld	60 min	Eurobahn

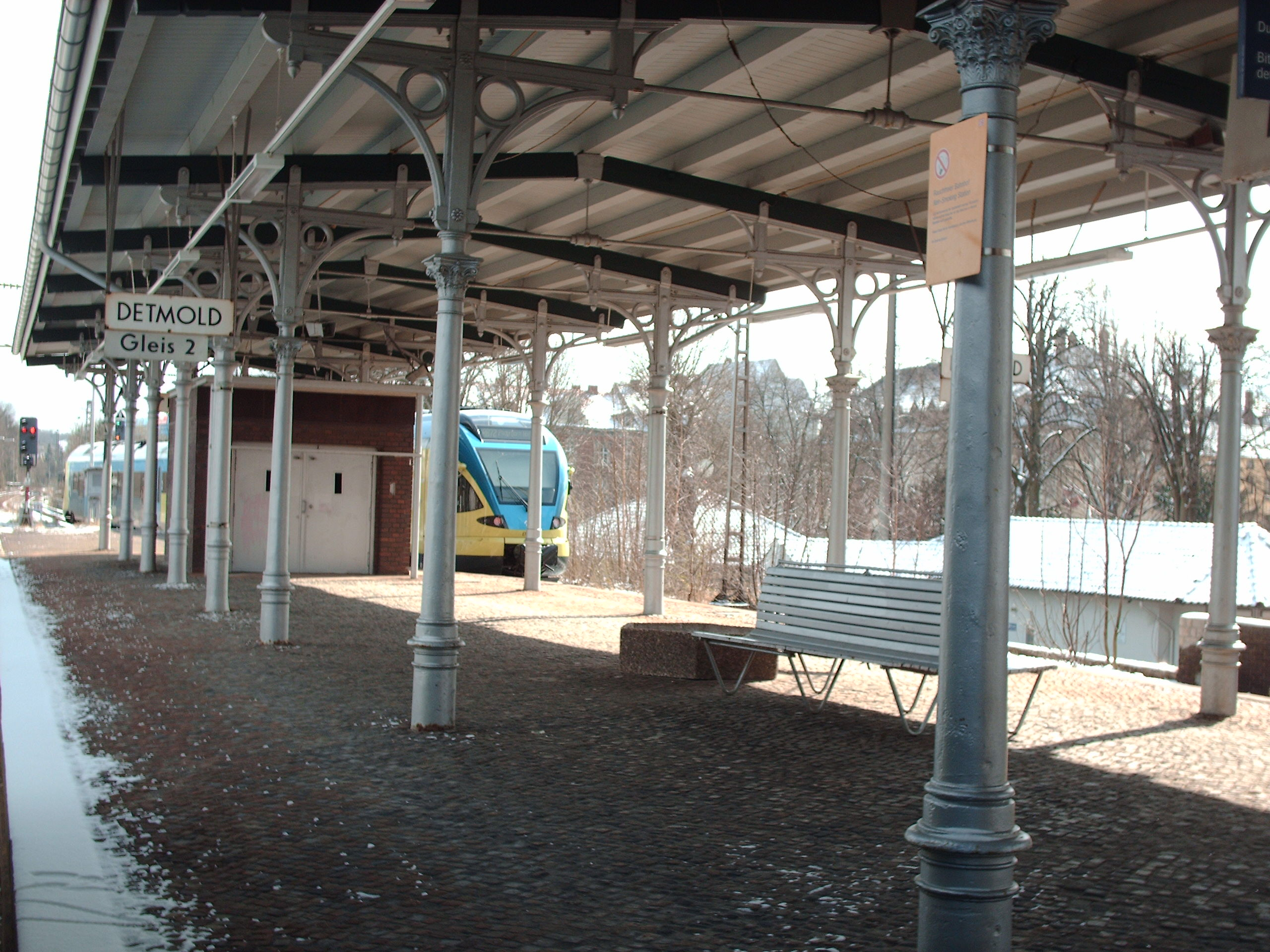
An Ostwestfalen-Bahn service leaves the station

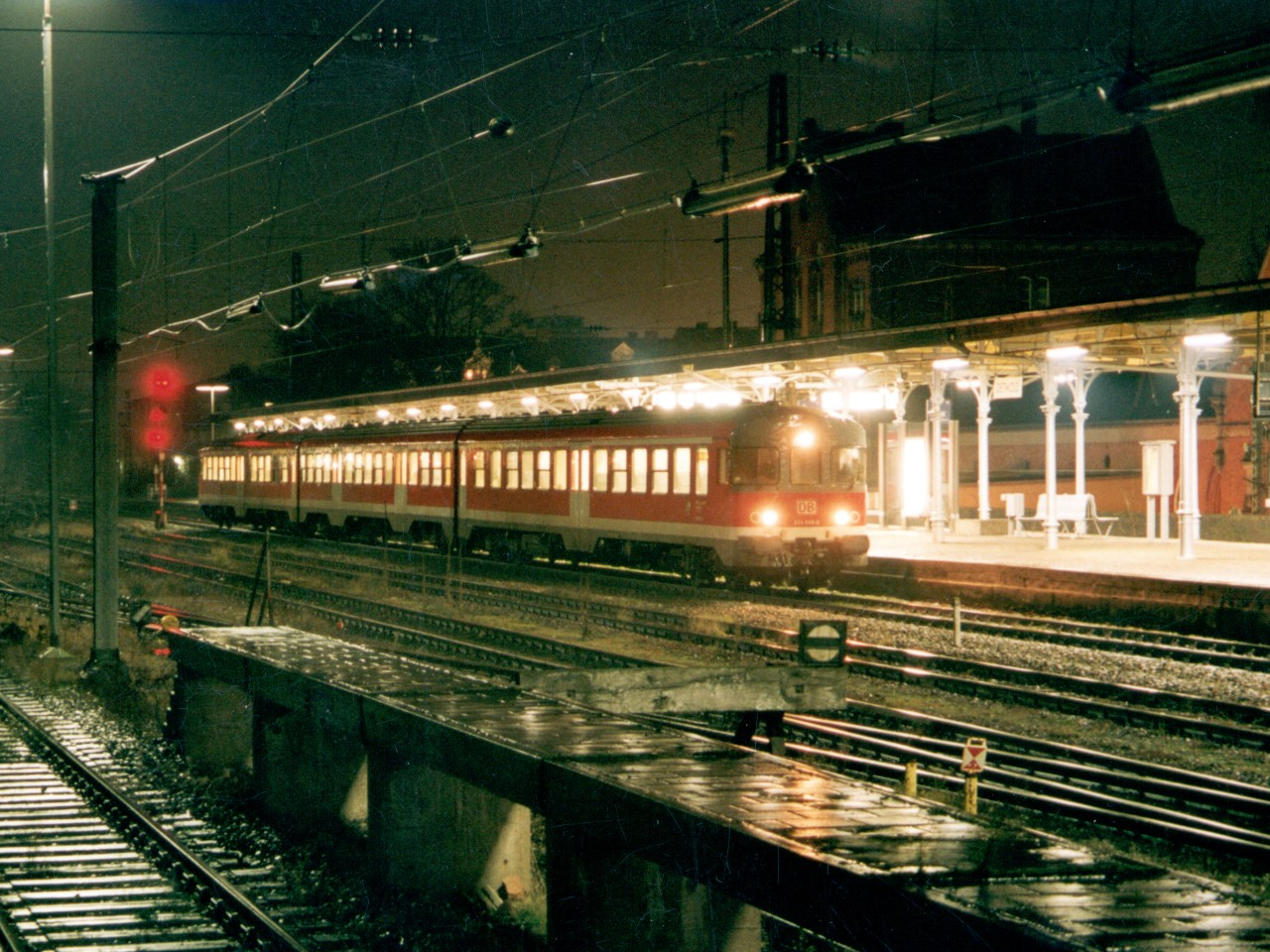
One of the last class 624 services in 2003

Detmold is covered by Der Sechser (“the six”) fares of the Zweckverband Verkehrsverbund OWL (Ostwestfalen-Lippe transport association). Towards Paderborn and to Bad Driburg there is a transition to the fares of the Nahverkehrsverbund Paderborn-Höxter (Paderborn-Höxter local transport association). NRW-tariff fares can also be used over the whole area.

== Connections ==
Buses run from the bus station on the station forecourt city to all the city's districts and regional buses run to Augustdorf, Blomberg, Horn-Bad Meinberg and Barntrup. The bus station is also connected to the Detmold – Augustdorf night bus network.
