= New Hartford =

New Hartford is the name of several places in the United States:

- New Hartford, Connecticut, a town in Litchfield County
- New Hartford, Iowa, a city in Butler County
- New Hartford Township, Minnesota, a township in Winona County
  - New Hartford, Minnesota, an unincorporated community within the town
- New Hartford, New York, a town in Oneida County
  - New Hartford (village), New York, a village within the town

== See also ==
- Hartford (disambiguation)
