= Hartford High School =

Hartford High School may refer to:

- Hartford Church of England High School, Hartford, Cheshire, England
- Hartford High School (Arkansas), Hartford, Arkansas, United States
- Hartford Public High School, Hartford, Connecticut, United States
- Hartford High School (Kansas), Hartford, Kansas, United States
