= Altenbeken station =

Railway station in Altenbeken, Germany

Altenbeken
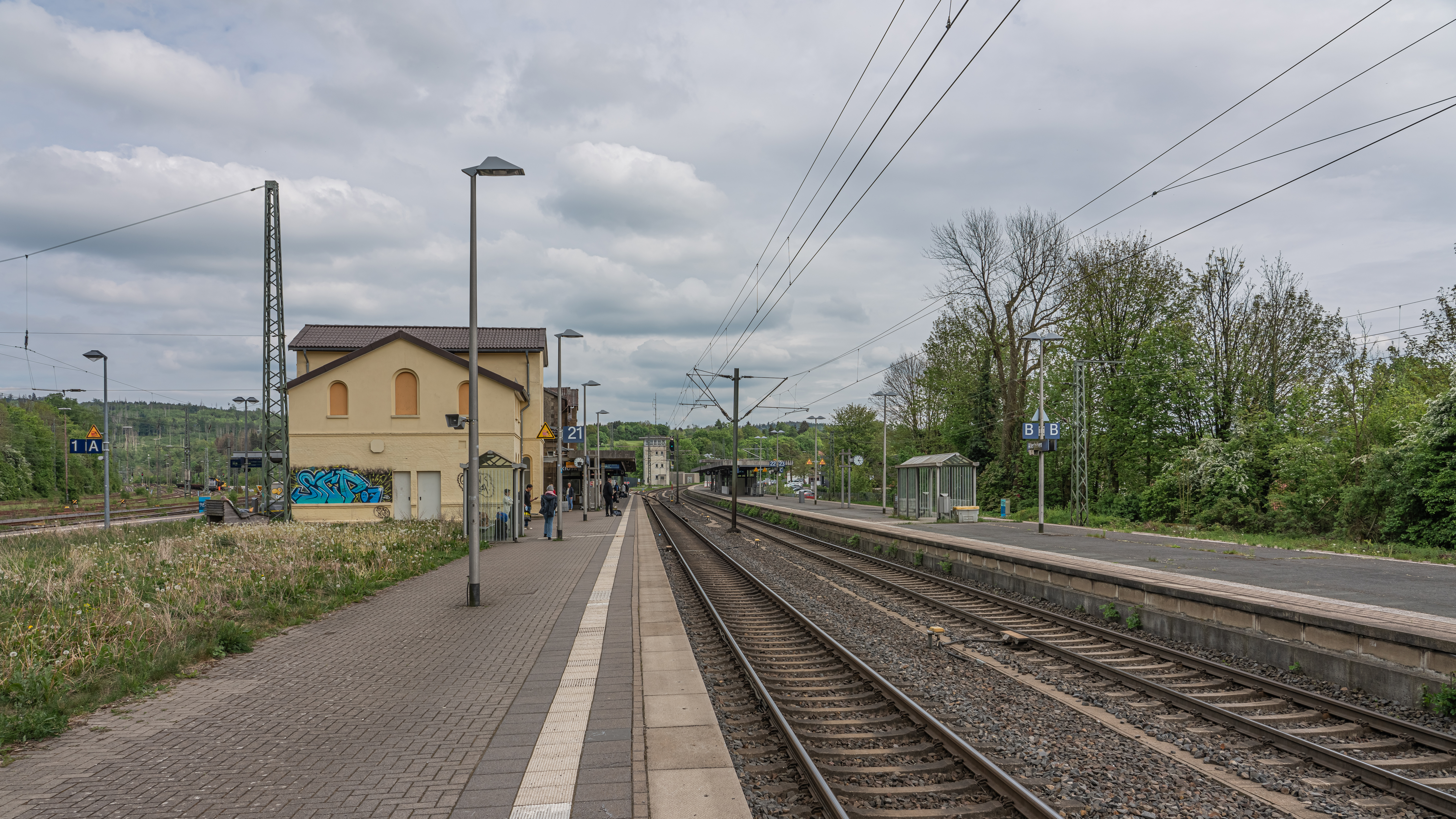

General information
- Location: Bahnhofstr. 13, Altenbeken, NRW; Germany
- Coordinates: 51°45′59″N 8°56′32″E
- Lines: Hamm–Warburg railway (KBS 430); Altenbeken–Kreiensen railway (KBS 403); Hanover–Altenbeken railway (KBS 363.4.5); Herford–Altenbeken railway (KBS 405)
- Platforms: 11 (5 in regular use)

Construction
- Accessible: Yes

Other information
- Station code: 85
- DS100 code: HA
- IBNR: 8000004
- Category: 3
- Fare zone: Westfalentarif: 77751
- Website: www.bahnhof.de

History
- Opened: 1 October 1864; Station building: 1865

Services
| Preceding station | DB Fernverkehr | Following station |
|---|---|---|
| Paderborn Hbf towards Köln Hbf | IC 51 | Warburg towards Gera Hbf |
| Preceding station | National Express Germany | Following station |
| Paderborn Hbf towards Düsseldorf Hbf | RE 11 (Rhein-Hellweg-Express) | Willebadessen towards Kassel-Wilhelmshöhe |
| Preceding station | | Following station |
| Horn-Bad Meinberg towards Bielefeld Hbf | RE 82 | Terminus |
| Paderborn Hbf Terminus | RB 72 | Sandebeck towards Herford |
| Paderborn Hbf towards Münster Hbf | RB 89 | Willebadessen towards Warburg |
| Preceding station | NordWestBahn | Following station |
| Paderborn Hbf Terminus | RB 84 | Bad Driburg (Westf) towards Kreiensen |
| Preceding station | Hanover S-Bahn | Following station |
| Paderborn Hbf Terminus | S 5 | Steinheim (Westf) towards Flughafen |
Location

Altenbeken station is in the municipality of Altenbeken in the Paderborn district of the German state of North Rhine-Westphalia. The station has a great importance as a hub for local and long-distance transport due to its location on the line from the Ruhr area to Warburg and Kassel, as well as to Holzminden–Kreiensen, Hanover and Herford. Its importance has increased recently because of the lack of Intercity-Express/Intercity services on the so-called Mid-Germany Railway (German: Mitte-Deutschland-Verbindung).

== History ==
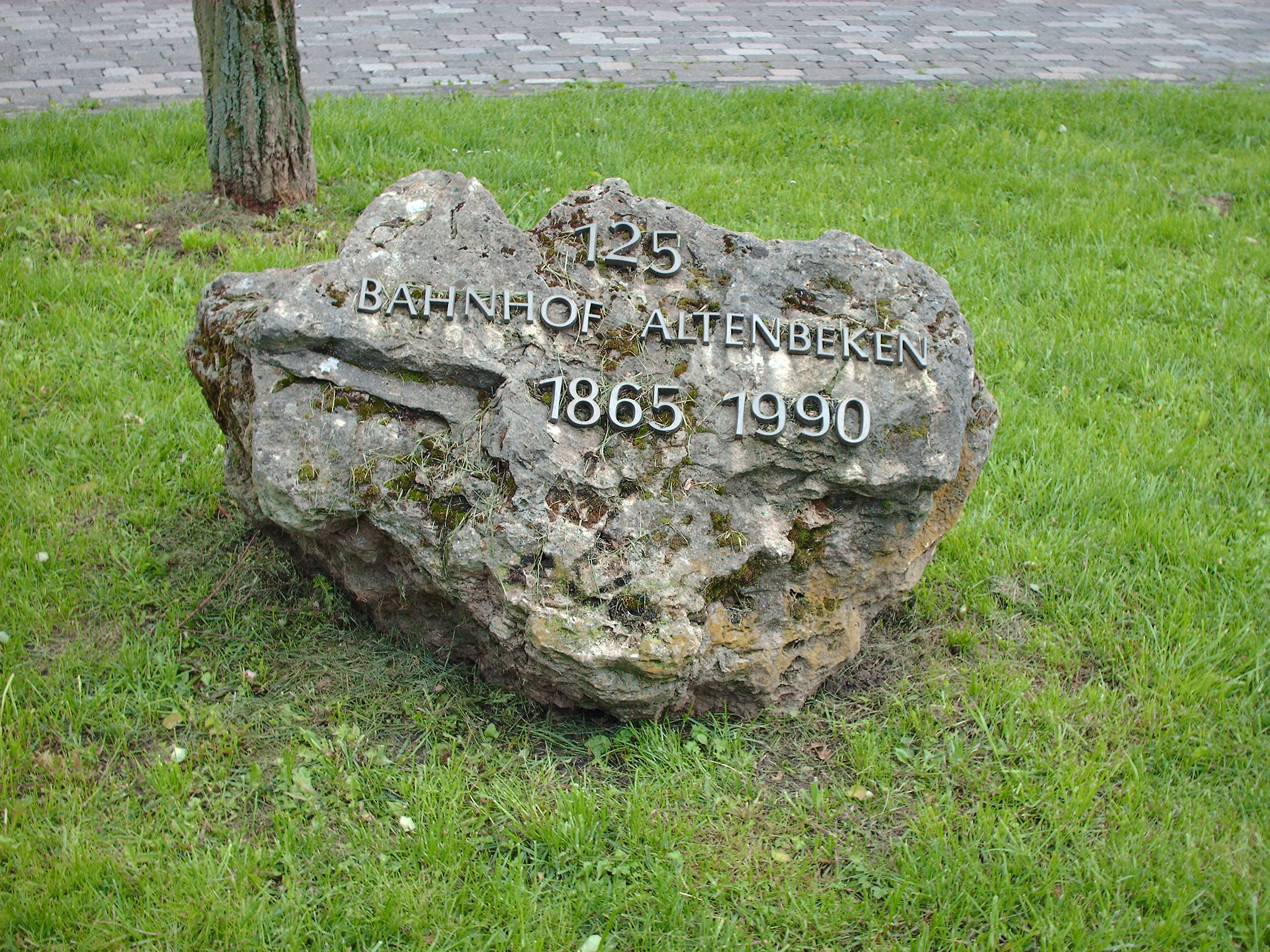
Stone commemorating anniversary of the station

The railway from Paderborn to Warburg opened in 1853, originally without a station at Altenbeken. The station was built with the branch line to Holzminden opened on 1 October 1864, the station building was opened in 1865. During the time of the Deutsche Reichsbahn (1920–1949), the station was part of the territory of the Directorate of Kassel (Reichsbahndirektion Kassel) and under Deutsche Bundesbahn it continued to be under the Directorate of Kassel, until its dissolution at the end of 1974, after which it was administered from Hanover.

Since the 1980s the line to Herford has only been served by regional services. Former semi-fast and express services from Osnabrück, Bielefeld or Bremen via Altenbeken, Kassel and Bebra and to southern Germany were eliminated one by one. The last service to be closed was the Der Cherusker service to Osnabrück and Bad Bentheim. Intercity-Express and Intercity services can now only be accessed indirectly through Herford. Through trains run to Bielefeld via Lage and the Bega Valley Railway via Oerlinghausen, where there is a connection to Münster. The route to Hanover has been served since 2000 by the Hanover S-Bahn. Intercity trains stopped at Altenbeken station until December 2007, including occasional ICE T trains. Since the timetable change in December 2010, daily pairs of Intercity-Express trains run to and from Dresden and Munich.

== Station layout ==
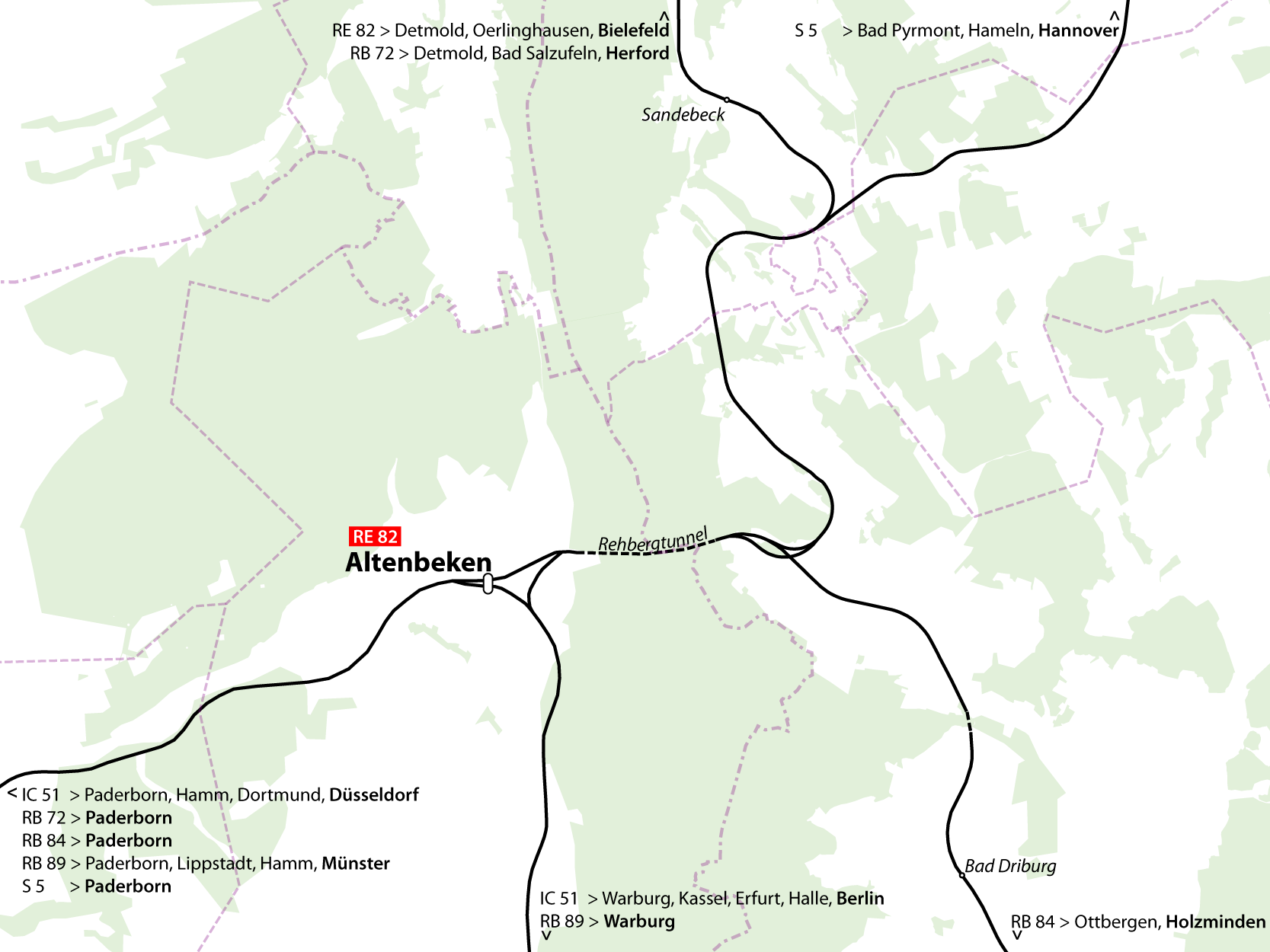
Lines around Altenbeken

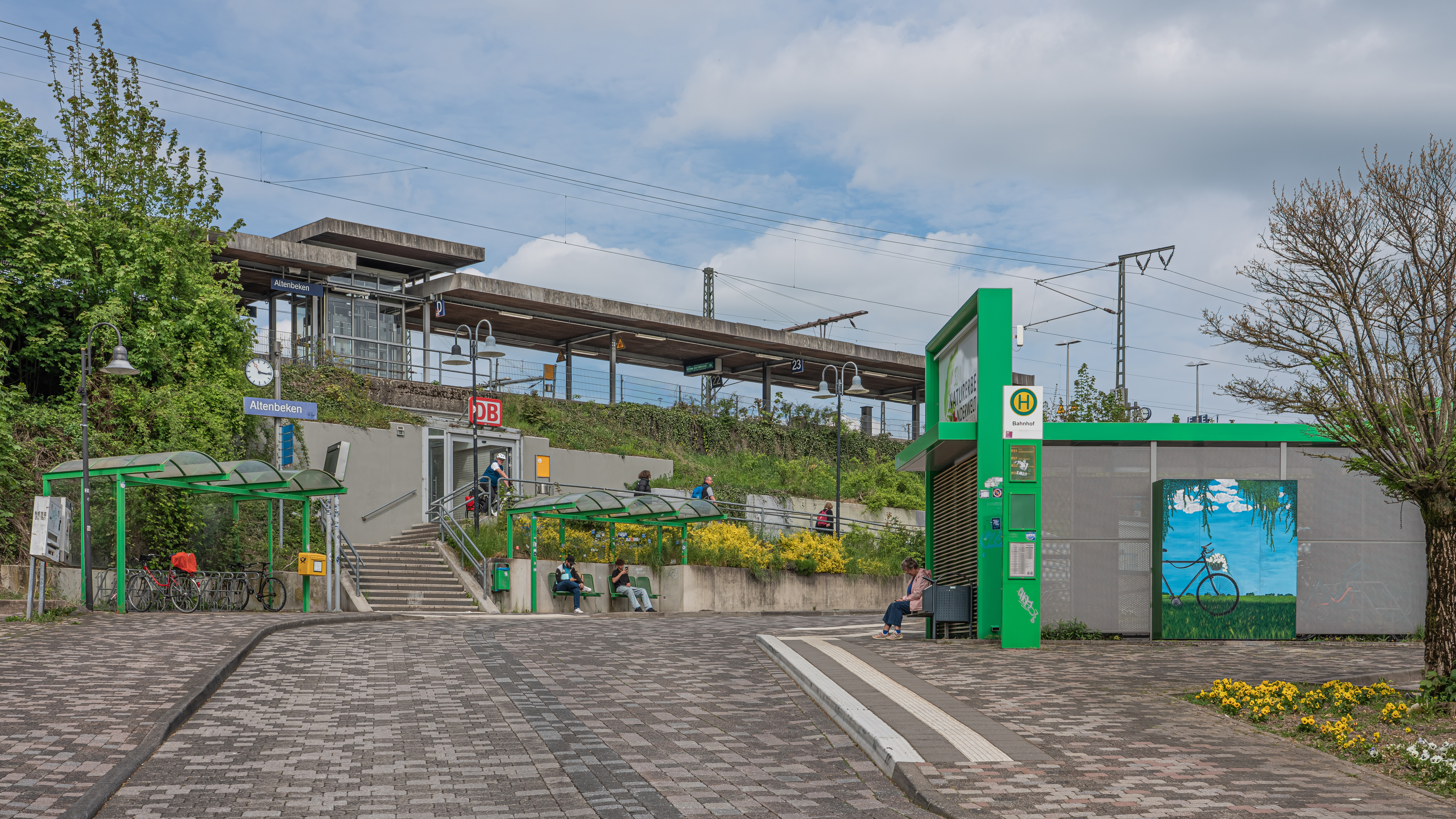
Station exit

The station has eleven platform tracks with a length of 140 metres to 403 metres and platform heights varying between 38 and 76 centimetres. The opening of platform 200 on 30 May 1958 to allow a connection between the lines from Hanover or Herford towards Warburg and Kassel means that were now platforms of three sides of a triangle. The track on the third side is now only used by freight.

Altenbeken station is an Inselbahnhof ("island station", with the station building surrounded by tracks), which means that the reception building is only accessible through underpasses. A total of four lines leave the station in an easterly direction and the only westerly route runs over the Altenbeken Viaduct towards Paderborn. Because of these characteristics of the railways, the station is also known as the Fünffingerbahnhof (five fingers station).

== Electrification ==
On 11 December 1970, the electrification of the Hamm–Kassel line completed and the first electric locomotive was able to enter Altenbeken station. On 21 May 1971, electrification was completed on the Altenbeken–Hanover line. Except for the line to Höxter and Kreiensen are all lines are now electrified.

== Current services ==
On the line, some long-distance passenger services stop on Intercity services, including one daily service on line IC 51 from Düsseldorf to Dresden). The station is served by several Regional-Express and Regionalbahn lines. It is also a stop on Hanover S-Bahn line S 5 to Hamelin, Hanover and Hanover Airport every hour (every two hours on Sundays).

| Line | Name | Route | |
|---|---|---|---|
| ICE 41 | | Düsseldorf – Hamm – Altenbeken – Kassel – Würzburg – Nuremberg – Munich | |
| IC 51 | Mitte-Deutschland-Verbindung | Düsseldorf – Hamm – Altenbeken – Kassel – Erfurt – Gera | |
| RE 11 | Rhein-Hellweg-Express | Düsseldorf – Düsseldorf Airport – Duisburg – Essen – Dortmund – Hamm (Westf) – Paderborn – Altenbeken – Kassel-Wilhelmshöhe | |
| RE 82 | Der Leineweber | Altenbeken – Detmold – Bielefeld | |
| RB 72 | Ostwestfalen-Bahn | Herford – Lage (Lippe) – Detmold – Altenbeken – Paderborn | |
| RB 84 RB 85 | Egge-Bahn | Paderborn – Altenbeken – Ottbergen (coupling/uncoupling) – | Holzminden – Kreiensen |
| RB 84 RB 85 | Oberweserbahn | Paderborn – Altenbeken – Ottbergen (coupling/uncoupling) – | Bodenfelde – Göttingen |
| RB 89 | Ems-Börde-Bahn | Münster (Westf) – Hamm (Westf) – Paderborn – Altenbeken –Warburg (Westf) | |
| S 5 | S-Bahn Hannover | Paderborn – Altenbeken – Hamelin – Weetzen – Hannover – Langenhagen – Hannover Flughafen | |
