= Harford (surname) =

Harford is an English surname, a variant of Hereford, which is a toponymic surname. Still another variant is Hafford. Notable people with the surname include:

- Barney Harford (born 1972), British-American executive
- Betty Harford (1927–2025), American actress
- Henry Harford (1758–1834), 5th Proprietor of Maryland
- James Harford (1899–1993), British diplomat
- John Scandrett Harford (1785–1866), British banker, benefactor and abolitionist
- Lesbia Harford (1891-1927), Australian poet, novelist and political activist
- Losi Harford (born 1973), New Zealand cricketer
- Mick Harford (born 1959), English footballer
- Noel Harford (1930–1981), New Zealand cricketer
- Ray Harford (1945–2003), English footballer
- Roy Harford (born 1936), New Zealand cricketer
- Tim Harford (born 1973), English economist and journalist
