= Herfordia =

Herfordia may refer to:

- 10669 Herfordia, a main-belt asteroid discovered on March 16, 1977
- Herfordia (beetle), a beetle genus in the subfamily Latridiinae

== See also ==
- Herford (disambiguation)
