= Harford =

Harford may refer to:

== Places ==
=== Australia ===
- Harford, Tasmania, a small rural community

=== United Kingdom ===
- Harford, Devon, a hamlet and parish

=== United States ===
- Harford, New York, a town in Cortland County
- Harford, Pennsylvania, a village in Susquehanna County
  - Harford Township, Susquehanna County, Pennsylvania, which includes the village
- Harford County, Maryland

== Other uses ==
- Harford (surname)

== See also ==
- Hartford (disambiguation)
- Hertford
- Hafford
