= Southern Lyon County USD 252 =

Public school district in Hartford, Kansas

Address
- 100 Commercial St. #A Hartford, Kansas, 66854; United States
- Coordinates: 38°18.6046′N 95°57.4117′W

District information
- Type: Public
- Grades: K to 12
- Established: 1965
- Superintendent: Ryan Muhlig
- School board: 7 members
- Schools: 3

Other information
- Website: usd252.org

Southern Lyon County USD 252 is a public unified school district headquartered in Hartford, Kansas, United States. The district includes the communities of Hartford, Neosho Rapids, Olpe, and nearby rural areas. Ryan Muhlig is the current superintendent.

== History ==
In 1965, Hartford, Neosho Rapids, and Olpe consolidated to form Southern Lyon County USD 252.

On March 14, 2011, the Southern Lyon County Board of Education approved One–to–One Technology initiatives, allowing the district to improve technology. Apple products were brought in, giving teachers a MacBook Pro laptop and an iPad 2. Students, K thru 6, were given iPad 2's, being kept in the schools, on carts. Junior high school students were given MacBook Air laptops to stay at school for day use only, where as high school students were given MacBook Air laptops to take home.

Hartford-Neosho Rapids Schools

Hartford High School was established in 1857, shortly after the city of Hartford was founded. In 1963, Hartford and Neosho Rapids consolidated to Hartford High School, Neosho Rapids Junior High School, and Neosho Rapids Elementary School. When formed, the mascot became the Jaguar.

Olpe High School

Olpe Elementary

Before Olpe Elementary was built, the school was called Harmony Hill, a one–room school house. It was located in the country about 3 miles north of Olpe. In December 1991, Olpe Elementary School was completed. The elementary wing of the building adjoins the cafeteria to the west of the high school. In 1997, two additional classrooms and a library were added to the elementary school.

== Schools ==
The school district operates the following schools:

- Hartford High School in Hartford
- Olpe High School in Olpe
- Neosho Rapids Elementary School in Neosho Rapids
- Olpe Elementary School in Olpe

Closed schools

- Harmony Hill Elementary School – (08/01/1979 – 01/01/1992)
- Neosho Rapids Grade School – (08/01/1936 – 06/01/1991)
- Olpe Grade School 5 thru 6 – (08/01/1968 – 06/01/1979)

== See also ==
- List of high schools in Kansas
- List of unified school districts in Kansas
- Kansas State Department of Education
- Kansas State High School Activities Association
