= Olpe, Kansas =

City in Lyon County, Kansas

- City
- Location within Lyon County and Kansas

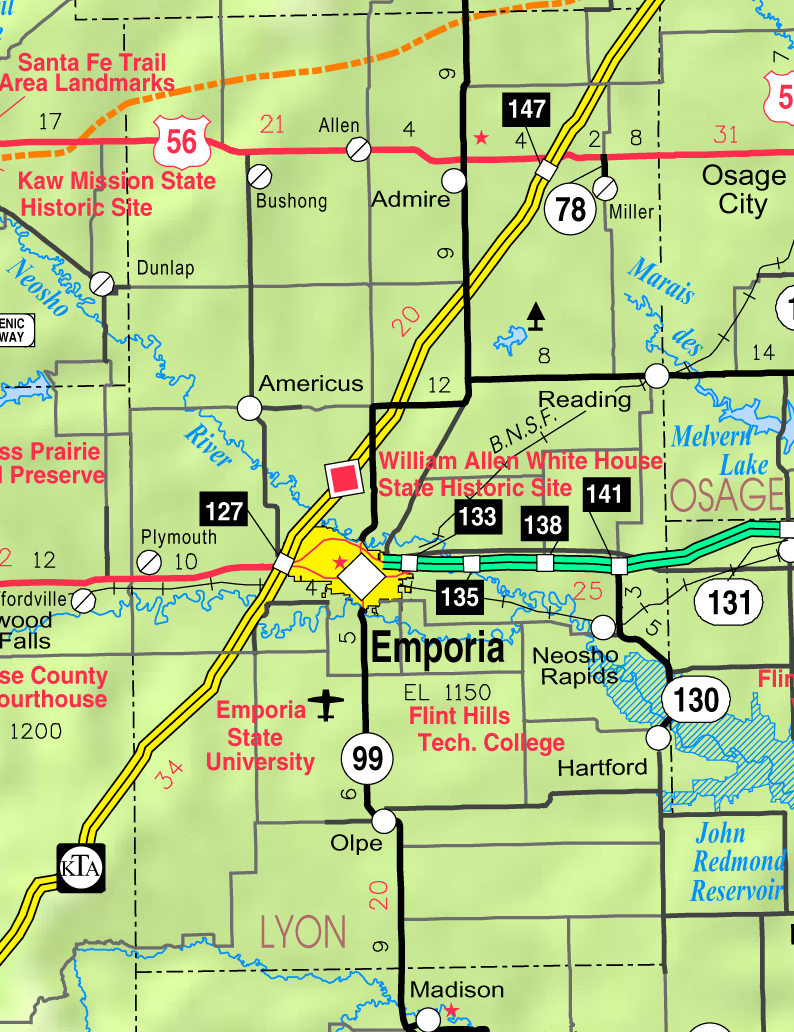
- KDOT map of Lyon County (legend)
- Coordinates: 38°15′43″N 96°09′57″W
- Country: United States
- State: Kansas
- County: Lyon
- Founded: 1850s
- Incorporated: 1905
- Named for: Olpe, Germany

Government
  - Type: Mayor–Council

Area
  - Total: 0.83 sq mi (2.14 km^{2})
  - Land: 0.70 sq mi (1.82 km^{2})
  - Water: 0.13 sq mi (0.33 km^{2})
- Elevation: 1,204 ft (367 m)

Population (2020)
  - Total: 519
  - Density: 739/sq mi (285/km^{2})
- Time zone: UTC-6 (CST)
  - Summer (DST): UTC-5 (CDT)
- ZIP Code: 66865
- Area code: 620
- FIPS code: 20-52800
- GNIS ID: 2396061
- Website: www.cityofolpe.org

Olpe is a city in Lyon County, Kansas, United States. As of the 2020 census, the population of the city was 519.

== History and etymology ==
Olpe got its start in the year 1879 following construction of the railroad through that territory. It had formerly been known as Eagle Creek Station before the name had been changed to Bitlertown after the owner of the townsite, Gilbert Bitler. A large share of the early settlers being natives of Olpe, Germany, caused the name to be selected.

Olpe was incorporated as a city in 1905.

== Geography ==
According to the United States Census Bureau, the city has a total area of 0.80 square miles (2.07 km^{2}), of which 0.67 square miles (1.74 km^{2}) is land and 0.13 square miles (0.34 km^{2}) is water.

=== Climate ===
The climate in this area is characterized by hot, humid summers and generally mild to cool winters. According to the Köppen Climate Classification system, Olpe has a humid subtropical climate, abbreviated "Cfa" on climate maps.

== Demographics ==
Historical population
Census	Pop.	Note	%±
1910	215		—
1920	235		9.3%
1930	317		34.9%
1940	331		4.4%
1950	293		−11.5%
1960	722		146.4%
1970	453		−37.3%
1980	477		5.3%
1990	431		−9.6%
2000	504		16.9%
2010	546		8.3%
2020	519		−4.9%
U.S. Decennial Census

Olpe is part of the Emporia Micropolitan Statistical Area.

=== 2020 census ===
The 2020 United States census counted 519 people, 205 households, and 140 families in Olpe. The population density was 739.3 per square mile (285.5/km^{2}). There were 230 housing units at an average density of 327.6 per square mile (126.5/km^{2}). The racial makeup was 93.83% (487) white or European American (93.06% non-Hispanic white), 0.39% (2) black or African-American, 0.39% (2) Native American or Alaska Native, 0.39% (2) Asian, 0.0% (0) Pacific Islander or Native Hawaiian, 0.77% (4) from other races, and 4.24% (22) from two or more races. Hispanic or Latino of any race was 2.7% (14) of the population.

Of the 205 households, 36.1% had children under the age of 18; 56.6% were married couples living together; 21.5% had a female householder with no spouse or partner present. 29.8% of households consisted of individuals and 15.1% had someone living alone who was 65 years of age or older. The average household size was 2.6 and the average family size was 3.4. The percent of those with a bachelor's degree or higher was estimated to be 13.5% of the population.

28.5% of the population was under the age of 18, 7.7% from 18 to 24, 21.0% from 25 to 44, 27.7% from 45 to 64, and 15.0% who were 65 years of age or older. The median age was 38.4 years. For every 100 females, there were 104.3 males. For every 100 females ages 18 and older, there were 101.6 males.

The 2016–2020 5-year American Community Survey estimates show that the median household income was $66,875 (with a margin of error of +/- $17,467) and the median family income was $79,464 (+/- $9,813). Males had a median income of $51,250 (+/- $8,106) versus $18,750 (+/- $8,086) for females. The median income for those above 16 years old was $34,306 (+/- $11,303). Approximately, 0.0% of families and 4.1% of the population were below the poverty line, including 0.0% of those under the age of 18 and 2.3% of those ages 65 or over.

=== 2010 census ===
As of the census of 2010, there were 546 people, 220 households, and 151 families residing in the city. The population density was 814.9 inhabitants per square mile (314.6/km^{2}). There were 239 housing units at an average density of 356.7 per square mile (137.7/km^{2}). The racial makeup of the city was 98.7% White, 0.2% African American, 0.2% from other races, and 0.9% from two or more races. Hispanic or Latino of any race were 0.5% of the population.

There were 220 households, of which 34.5% had children under the age of 18 living with them, 58.6% were married couples living together, 5.0% had a female householder with no husband present, 5.0% had a male householder with no wife present, and 31.4% were non-families. 25.9% of all households were made up of individuals, and 13.6% had someone living alone who was 65 years of age or older. The average household size was 2.48 and the average family size was 3.00.

The median age in the city was 39 years. 27.3% of residents were under the age of 18; 4.8% were between the ages of 18 and 24; 26.2% were from 25 to 44; 24% were from 45 to 64; and 17.8% were 65 years of age or older. The gender makeup of the city was 49.8% male and 50.2% female.

=== 2000 census ===
As of the census of 2000, there were 504 people, 196 households, and 137 families residing in the city. The population density was 1,604.1 inhabitants per square mile (619.3/km^{2}). There were 215 housing units at an average density of 684.3 per square mile (264.2/km^{2}). The racial makeup of the city was 98.81% White, 0.40% African American, 0.60% Native American, and 0.20% from two or more races. Hispanic or Latino of any race were 2.58% of the population.

There were 196 households, out of which 39.3% had children under the age of 18 living with them, 56.1% were married couples living together, 10.7% had a female householder with no husband present, and 30.1% were non-families. 28.6% of all households were made up of individuals, and 16.3% had someone living alone who was 65 years of age or older. The average household size was 2.57 and the average family size was 3.20.

In the city, the population was spread out, with 31.7% under the age of 18, 7.9% from 18 to 24, 28.6% from 25 to 44, 17.7% from 45 to 64, and 14.1% who were 65 years of age or older. The median age was 33 years. For every 100 females, there were 96.9 males. For every 100 females age 18 and over, there were 90.1 males.

The median income for a household in the city was $34,643, and the median income for a family was $37,813. Males had a median income of $30,625 versus $18,542 for females. The per capita income for the city was $13,623. About 5.8% of families and 7.3% of the population were below the poverty line, including 10.8% of those under age 18 and 8.3% of those age 65 or over.

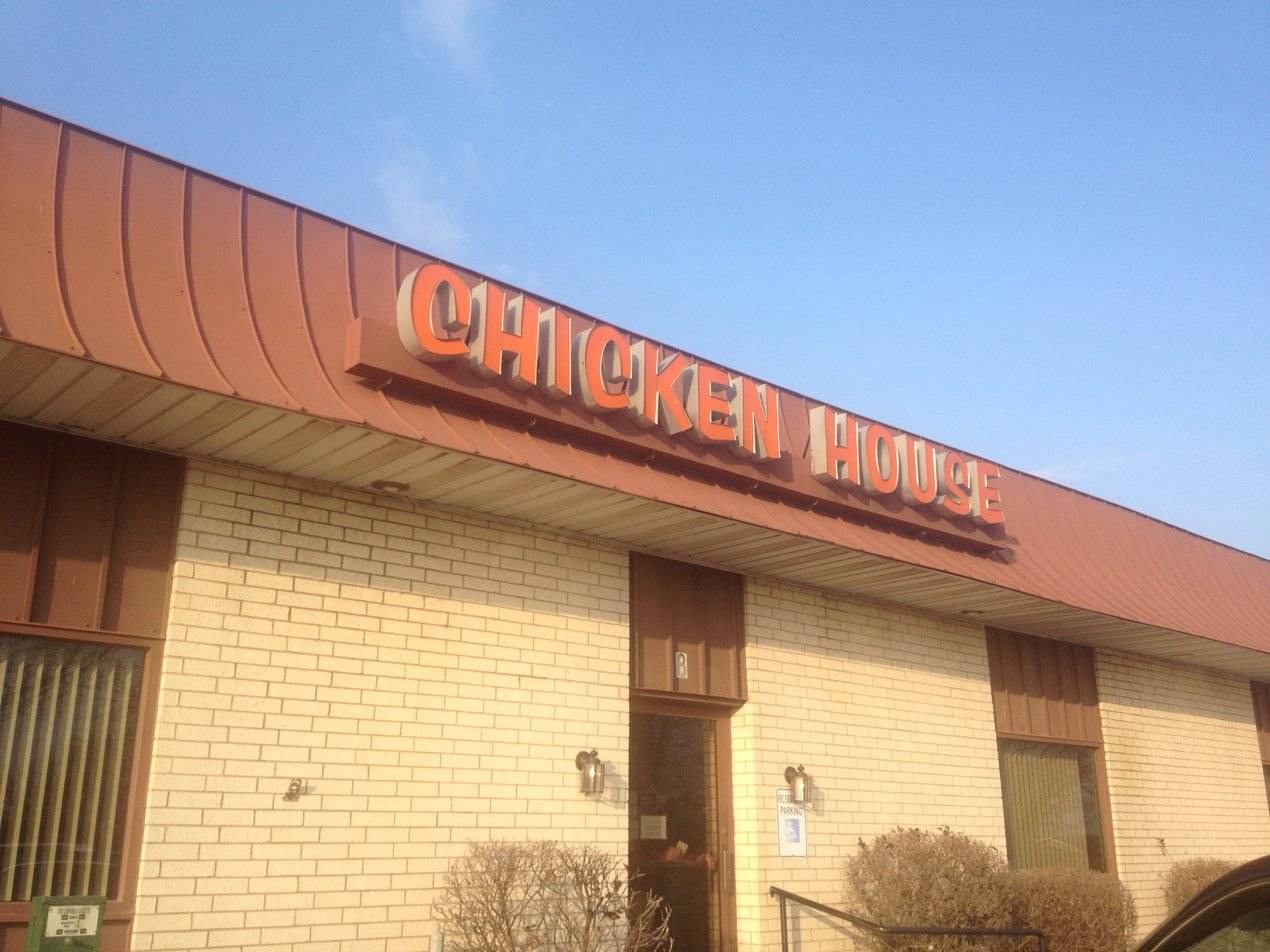
Front entrance to the Olpe Chicken House (February 2016)

== Attractions ==
The Chicken House is a restaurant that has been in operation since 1958, with roots to 1934. The restaurant has acted as a town hall, playing host to governors and state representatives and was named by USA Today as one of 50 Great Plates From 50 Great States in 2000. The restaurant has raised notice as far away as New Jersey.

== Education ==
The community is served by Southern Lyon County USD 252 public school district.

=== Olpe Elementary School ===
Before Olpe Elementary was a school, the school was called Harmony Hill, that started as a one-room school house and had later additions. It was located in the countryside, approximately three miles north of Olpe. In December 1991, Olpe Elementary School was completed. The elementary wing of the building adjoins the cafeteria to the west of the high school. In 1997, two additional classrooms and a library were added to the elementary school.

=== St. Joseph's Catholic School ===
Prior to the 1950s there was no public high school in Olpe; area students attended St. Joseph's Catholic School. Olpe High School was built in the early 1950s. The first class graduated from Olpe Rural High School in 1952; however, the new building was then incomplete. That first year, the old St. Joseph's High School building was rented and classes were held there. Students began attending the newly constructed building the next year. Since then, it has housed kindergarten through sixth grade classes. After the 2012–2013 school year, Saint Joseph's Catholic School closed, due to the economy.
