= Museum of South Somerset =

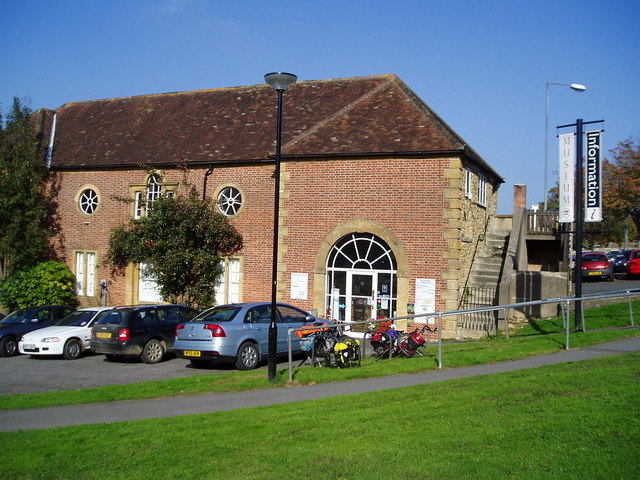

- Shown within Somerset
- Location: Hendford, Yeovil, Somerset, England
- Coordinates: 50.9394°N 2.6348°W
- Type: Local museum

The Museum of South Somerset was located in Hendford, Yeovil, Somerset, England. It was also the location of a Tourist information centre. The museum was closed in 2011 and its collections were moved to the Community Heritage Access Centre at SSDC Lufton Depot, 7 Artillery Road, Lufton.

== History ==
The collection was started by Alderman W.R.E. Mitchelmore, Mayor of Yeovil from 1918 - 1921. It was based in the former coach house to Hendford Manor. The manor house itself was built around 1720 and has since been converted into offices and is a Grade II* listed building.

There were displays of local history and geology particularly local industries such as leather and glove-making, flax and hemp production, stone working, engineering and newspaper printing. The display cover various stages of the history of the area prehistoric and Roman occupation, through to agricultural and industrial revolutions. The Lower Gallery was used to house temporary touring exhibitions, while the upper gallery had permanent displays, including a reconstructed Roman dining room and kitchen with mosaics recreated from excavations of local villas at Westland, Lufton and Ilchester. There were also displays of local prehistory and geology. A period Georgian house provided glimpses into the museum's glassware, costume and social history collections. Items from the museum's firearms, pottery and painting collections were also exhibited and changed regularly.
