= Hartford, Kansas =

City in Lyon County, Kansas

- City
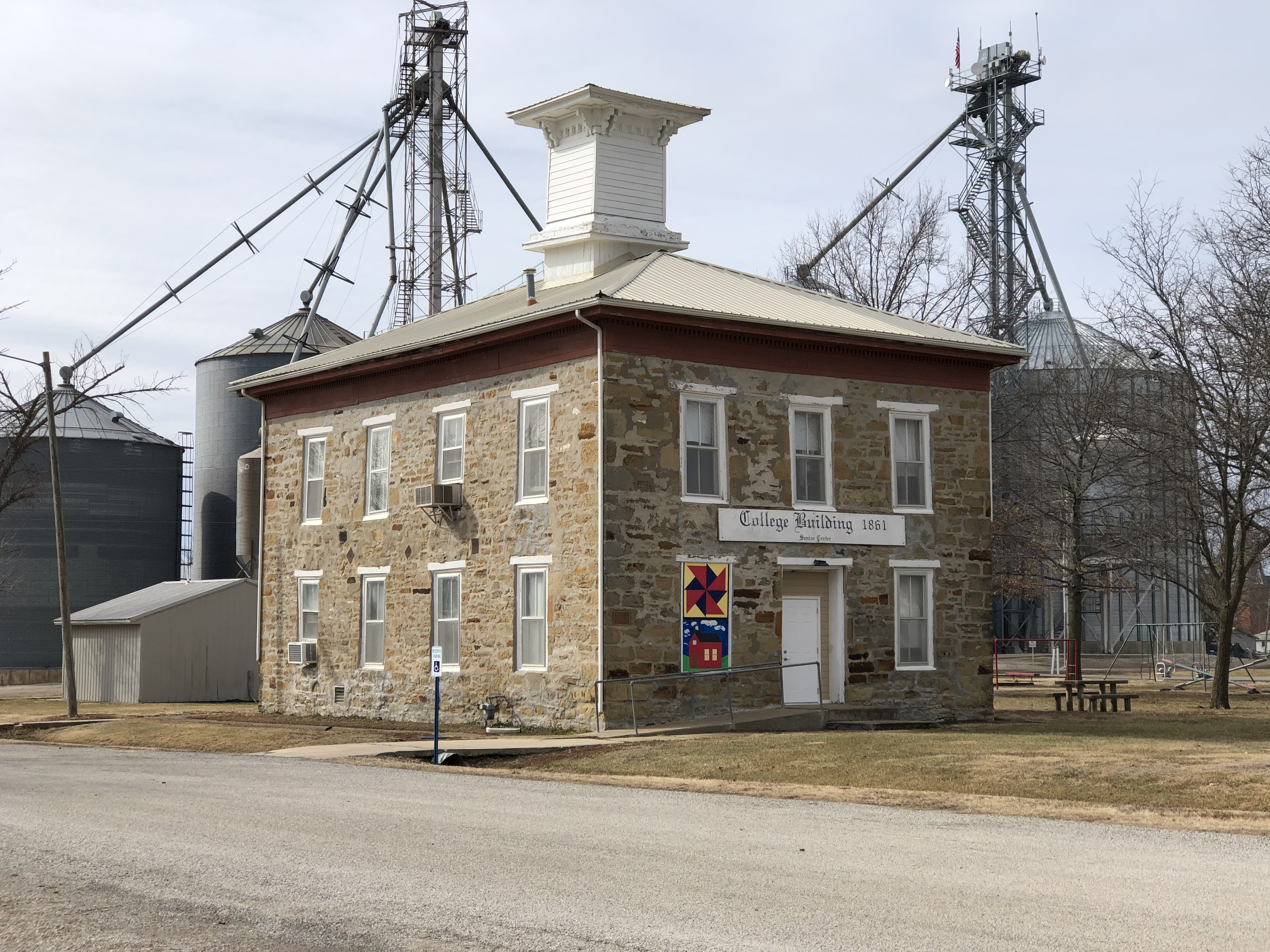
- 1861 Hartford Collegiate Institute building (2021)

- Location within Lyon County and Kansas

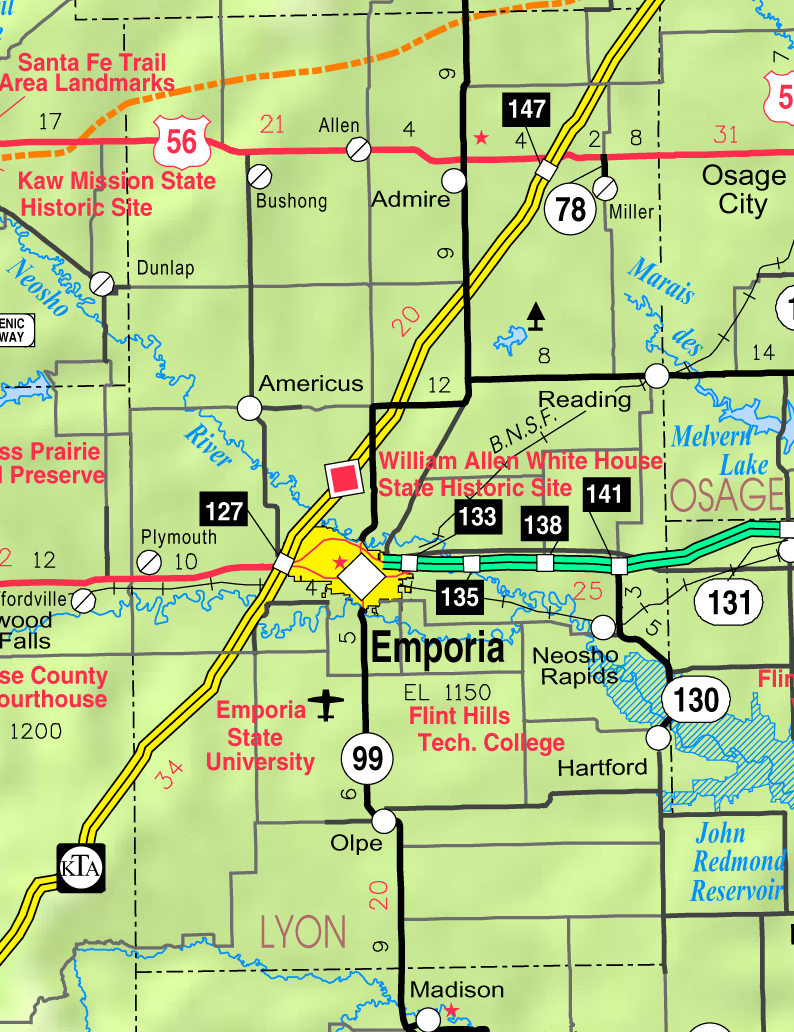
- KDOT map of Lyon County (legend)
- Coordinates: 38°18′30″N 95°57′24″W
- Country: United States
- State: Kansas
- County: Lyon
- Platted: 1858
- Incorporated: 1929

Government
  - Type: Mayor–Council

Area
  - Total: 0.40 sq mi (1.03 km^{2})
  - Land: 0.40 sq mi (1.03 km^{2})
  - Water: 0 sq mi (0.00 km^{2})
- Elevation: 1,083 ft (330 m)

Population (2020)
  - Total: 355
  - Density: 893/sq mi (345/km^{2})
- Time zone: UTC-6 (CST)
  - Summer (DST): UTC-5 (CDT)
- ZIP Code: 66854
- Area code: 620
- FIPS code: 20-30475
- GNIS ID: 2394308

Hartford is a city in Lyon County, Kansas, United States. As of the 2020 census, the population of the city was 355.

== History ==
Hartford was laid out in 1858. Some of its founders were natives of Hartford, Connecticut, hence the name.

Hartford was incorporated as a city in March 1884.

== Geography ==
According to the United States Census Bureau, the city has a total area of 0.38 square miles (0.98 km^{2}), all land.

== Demographics ==
Historical population
Census	Pop.	Note	%±
1890	441		—
1900	553		25.4%
1910	589		6.5%
1920	575		−2.4%
1930	516		−10.3%
1940	491		−4.8%
1950	395		−19.6%
1960	337		−14.7%
1970	478		41.8%
1980	551		15.3%
1990	541		−1.8%
2000	500		−7.6%
2010	371		−25.8%
2020	355		−4.3%
U.S. Decennial Census

Hartford is part of the Emporia Micropolitan Statistical Area.

=== 2020 census ===
The 2020 United States census counted 355 people, 155 households, and 99 families in Hartford. The population density was 896.5 per square mile (346.1/km^{2}). There were 185 housing units at an average density of 467.2 per square mile (180.4/km^{2}). The racial makeup was 93.52% (332) white or European American (93.52% non-Hispanic white), 0.0% (0) black or African-American, 0.56% (2) Native American or Alaska Native, 0.56% (2) Asian, 0.0% (0) Pacific Islander or Native Hawaiian, 1.13% (4) from other races, and 4.23% (15) from two or more races. Hispanic or Latino of any race was 1.69% (6) of the population.

Of the 155 households, 23.9% had children under the age of 18; 45.8% were married couples living together; 29.0% had a female householder with no spouse or partner present. 30.3% of households consisted of individuals and 13.5% had someone living alone who was 65 years of age or older. The average household size was 2.6 and the average family size was 3.3. The percent of those with a bachelor's degree or higher was estimated to be 10.1% of the population.

20.8% of the population was under the age of 18, 7.3% from 18 to 24, 22.5% from 25 to 44, 30.4% from 45 to 64, and 18.9% who were 65 years of age or older. The median age was 43.6 years. For every 100 females, there were 82.1 males. For every 100 females ages 18 and older, there were 95.1 males.

The 2016–2020 5-year American Community Survey estimates show that the median household income was $43,250 (with a margin of error of +/- $9,767) and the median family income was $49,583 (+/- $34,107). Males had a median income of $33,500 (+/- $18,987) versus $25,625 (+/- $11,884) for females. The median income for those above 16 years old was $27,500 (+/- $17,605). Approximately, 6.2% of families and 19.6% of the population were below the poverty line, including 27.8% of those under the age of 18 and 0.0% of those ages 65 or over.

=== 2010 census ===
As of the census of 2010, there were 371 people, 160 households, and 98 families residing in the city. The population density was 976.3 inhabitants per square mile (377.0/km^{2}). There were 193 housing units at an average density of 507.9 per square mile (196.1/km^{2}). The racial makeup of the city was 96.5% White, 0.3% African American, 1.1% Native American, 0.3% Asian, and 1.9% from two or more races. Hispanic or Latino of any race were 2.2% of the population.

There were 160 households, of which 30.6% had children under the age of 18 living with them, 41.3% were married couples living together, 12.5% had a female householder with no husband present, 7.5% had a male householder with no wife present, and 38.8% were non-families. 33.8% of all households were made up of individuals, and 14.4% had someone living alone who was 65 years of age or older. The average household size was 2.25 and the average family size was 2.87.

The median age in the city was 44.6 years. 23.5% of residents were under the age of 18; 8.9% were between the ages of 18 and 24; 18.3% were from 25 to 44; 32.3% were from 45 to 64; and 17% were 65 years of age or older. The gender makeup of the city was 52.3% male and 47.7% female.

=== 2000 census ===
At the 2000 census, there were 500 people, 200 households and 125 families residing in the city. The population density was 1,329.1 inhabitants per square mile (513.2/km^{2}). There were 220 housing units at an average density of 584.8 per square mile (225.8/km^{2}). The racial makeup of the city was 98.20% White, 0.60% African American, 0.40% Native American, 0.60% from other races, and 0.20% from two or more races. Hispanic or Latino of any race were 0.40% of the population.

There were 200 households, of which 33.0% had children under the age of 18 living with them, 51.0% were married couples living together, 9.5% had a female householder with no husband present, and 37.5% were non-families. 33.5% of all households were made up of individuals, and 11.5% had someone living alone who was 65 years of age or older. The average household size was 2.35 and the average family size was 3.06.

26.0% of the population were under the age of 18, 5.8% from 18 to 24, 29.4% from 25 to 44, 24.0% from 45 to 64, and 14.8% who were 65 years of age or older. The median age was 39 years. For every 100 females, there were 104.1 males. For every 100 females age 18 and over, there were 103.3 males.

The median household income was $34,750 and the median family income was $37,212. Males had a median income of $27,212 versus $23,250 for females. The per capita income for the city was $16,014. About 4.6% of families and 9.3% of the population were below the poverty line, including 5.0% of those under age 18 and 7.8% of those age 65 or over.

== Education ==
The community is served by Southern Lyon County USD 252 public school district. Hartford High School is located in Hartford.

== See also ==
- National Register of Historic Places listings in Lyon County, Kansas
- John Redmond Dam and Reservoir
- Great Flood of 1951
