= Hertford (disambiguation) =

Hertford is the county town of Hertfordshire, England.

Hertford may also refer to:

- Hertford (UK Parliament constituency), a former constituency
- Hertford Castle
- Hertford College, Oxford
- Hertford County, North Carolina
- Hertford, North Carolina, a town located in Perquimans County

== People ==
- Marquess of Hertford, a title in the Peerage of England
- Whit Hertford (born 1978), American actor and writer

== Ships ==
- SS Hertford

== See also ==
- Hartford (disambiguation)
