= Jay Herford =

American soccer player (born 1987)

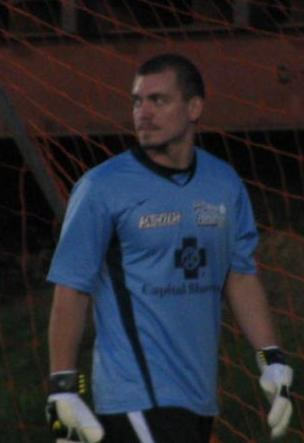

Personal information
- Date of birth: August 22, 1987 (age 39)
- Place of birth: Crofton, Maryland, United States
- Height: 6 ft 0 in (1.83 m)
- Position: Goalkeeper

Team information
- Current team: Crystal Palace Baltimore
- Number: 33

Youth career
- 2005–2008: Frostburg Bobcats

Senior career*
Years	Team	Apps	(Gls)
2009	Harrisburg City Islanders	1	(0)
2010–	Crystal Palace Baltimore	0	(0)
- * Club domestic league appearances and goals as of September 22, 2010

Jay Herford (born August 22, 1987, in Crofton, Maryland) is an American soccer player who played for Crystal Palace Baltimore in the USSF Division 2 Professional League.

== Career ==
=== College ===
Herford attended South River High School, and was a two-year starter at Frostburg State University, helping FSU to a 26-14-2 overall record during that time. He was an All-Allegheny Mountain Collegiate Conference Honorable Mention pick in 2007 and an All-Conference Second Team selection in 2008. He finished his senior season ranked second in the league in goals against average (0.77), third in save percentage (.797) and ninth in saves (59).

=== Professional ===
Herford turned professional in 2009 when he signed for the Harrisburg City Islanders of the USL Second Division. He made his professional debut - ironically, as an outfield player instead of a goalkeeper - on August 12, 2009, as a late substitute in Harrisburg's final regular season game of the 2009 season against Western Mass Pioneers.

Herford signed for Crystal Palace Baltimore of the USSF Division 2 Professional League as backup to first choice keeper Evan Bush.
