= Herford–Himmighausen railway =

Railway line in Germany

Herford–Himmighausen

Overview
- Line number: 2980
- Locale: North Rhine-Westphalia

Service
- Route number: 405

Technical
- Line length: 47.3 km (29.4 mi)
- Track gauge: 1,435 mm (4 ft 8 1/2 in) standard gauge
- Electrification: 15 kV/16.7 Hz AC overhead catenary
- Operating speed: 100 km/h (62.1 mph) (maximum)

The Herford–Himmighausen railway is a 48 km-long line from Herford via Detmold to Himmighausen (leading to Altenbeken) and is a single-track and electrified main line. It is located in Ostwestfalen-Lippe in the German state of North Rhine-Westphalia and is part of Deutsche Bahn’s Münster-Ostwestfalen regional network (MOW), which has its headquarters in Münster. In Herford this route is known as the Lippische Bahn (Lippe Railway). The line from Herford to Detmold was built by the Cologne-Minden Railway Company.

== History ==
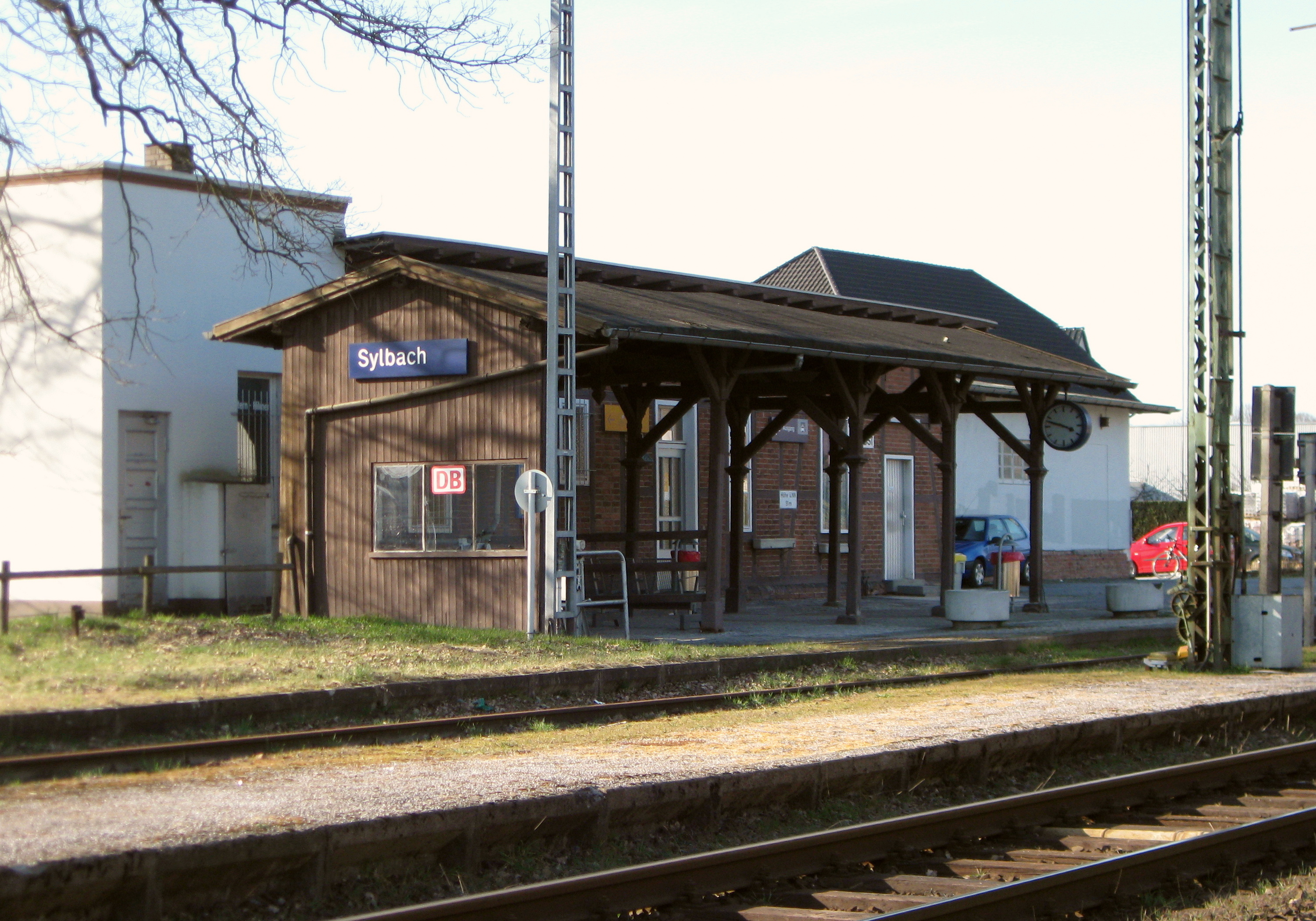
Sylbach halt and block post

The line was built in 1880 by the Cologne-Minden Railway Company (Köln-Mindener Eisenbahn-Gesellschaft, CME) branching off its trunk line between Bielefeld and Minden. Construction started in Herford and followed the easy course of the Werre river uphill. On 31 December 1880, the line was initially opened for freight only and only as far as Detmold.

A short time later, the CME was nationalised and the route became part of the Prussian state railways, along with the Hanover–Altenbeken railway built by the Hanover-Altenbeken Railway Company in 1872, which connected to the Hamm–Warburg railway built by the Royal Westphalian Railway Company.

To create a link between these two railway lines between Hamm and Hanover, the Herford–Detmold line was extended from the Were Valley to the Egge hills. On 12 June 1895, the whole line was opened to the newly constructed Himmighausen station on the Hanover–Altenbeken line. At the same time the old Sandebeck station on the Hanover–Altenbeken line was closed and passenger traffic was relocated to a new Haltepunkt (halt) Sandebeck on the new line. The new terminus at Himmighausen was of little importance as trains ran through to Altenbeken station, but it was a changing point to trains towards Hamelin station.

In 1896 work started on the Bega Valley Railway from Lage to Hamelin via Lemgo and Barntrup. This line was extended in 1904 from Lage to Bielefeld. The Herford–Himmighausen line was electrified between 1973 and 1975 to create a detour from the adjacent main lines during track work or other disruption.

The infrastructure has been rationalised as freight traffic has declined in recent years. Sylbach station was reclassified in 2005 as a halt with the dismantling of the crossing track; the mechanics of the manually operated level crossing are found in the heritage listed timber building. Although Nienhagen (b Detmold) station had not been served regularly by passenger trains since 1988, it was previously used for non-scheduled trains to pass, but it was dismantled in 2006.

=== Long-distance transport ===
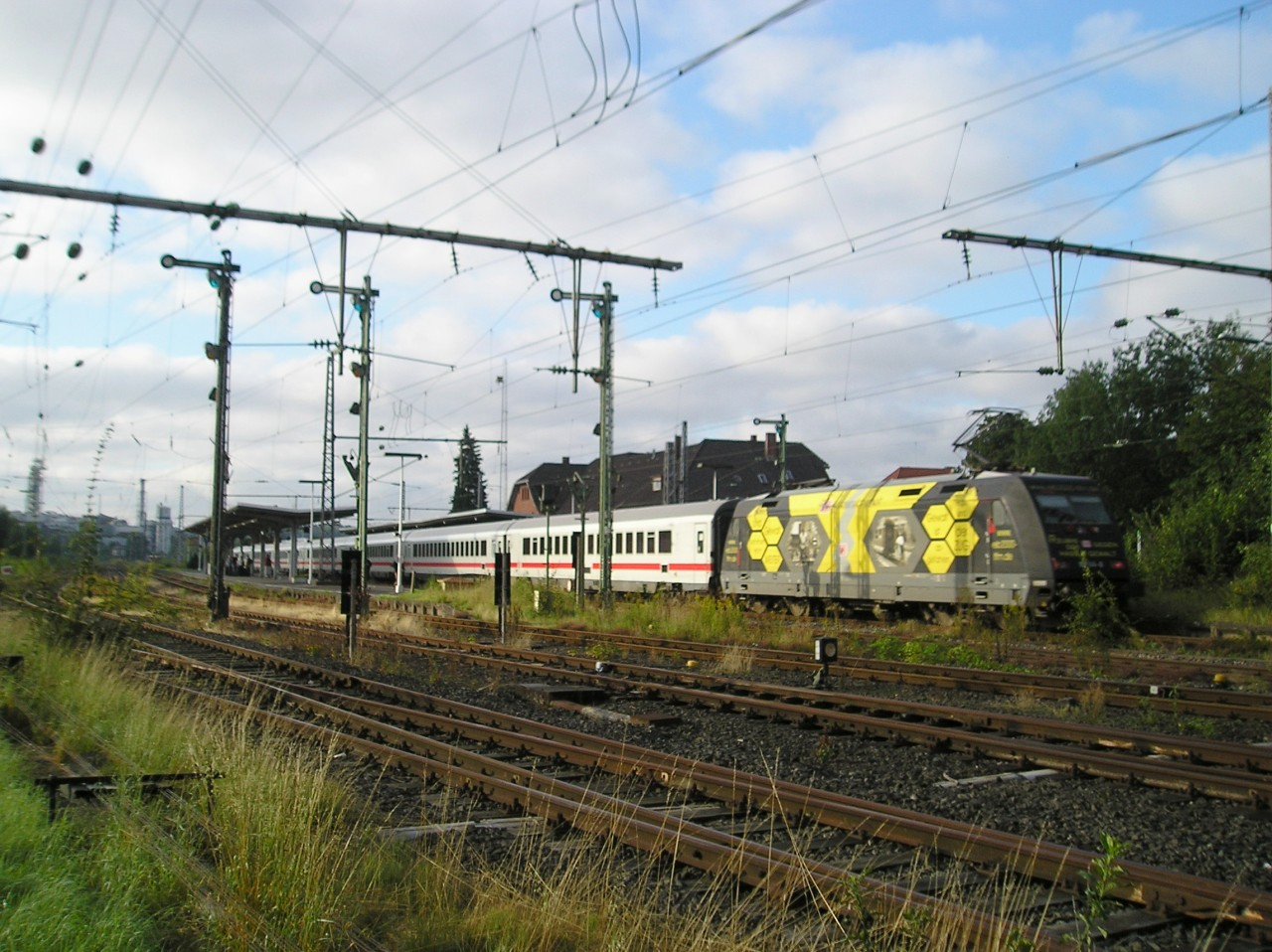
101 141 with empty rollingstock running from Düsseldorf to Paderborn on 12 August 2007 in Lage

The line had significant use for north–south long-distance traffic until the 1970s and 1980s. There were semi-fast trains (Eilzug) and express trains (Durchgangszug) with portions running from Osnabrück or Bielefeld via Warburg and Kassel to Munich via Würzburg (including a night train with sleeping and couchette cars) and to Basel. In the north semi-fast trains reached Hamburg or Cuxhaven. Some semi-fast trains ran as a diesel railcar or as a locomotive-hauled push-pull train on the Solling Railway to the Harz. The line was served by a pair of semi-fast trains between Enschede and Bad Pyrmont with reversal in Himmighausen.

Over the years, passenger services were, however, more and more rationalised. Instead of the long-distance trains, regular-interval regional services had already replaced long-distance services by the mid-1980s. Although long-distance trains have been diverted over the line because of reconstruction projects, this has become rarer as a result of the rationalisation of infrastructure.

=== Local transport ===
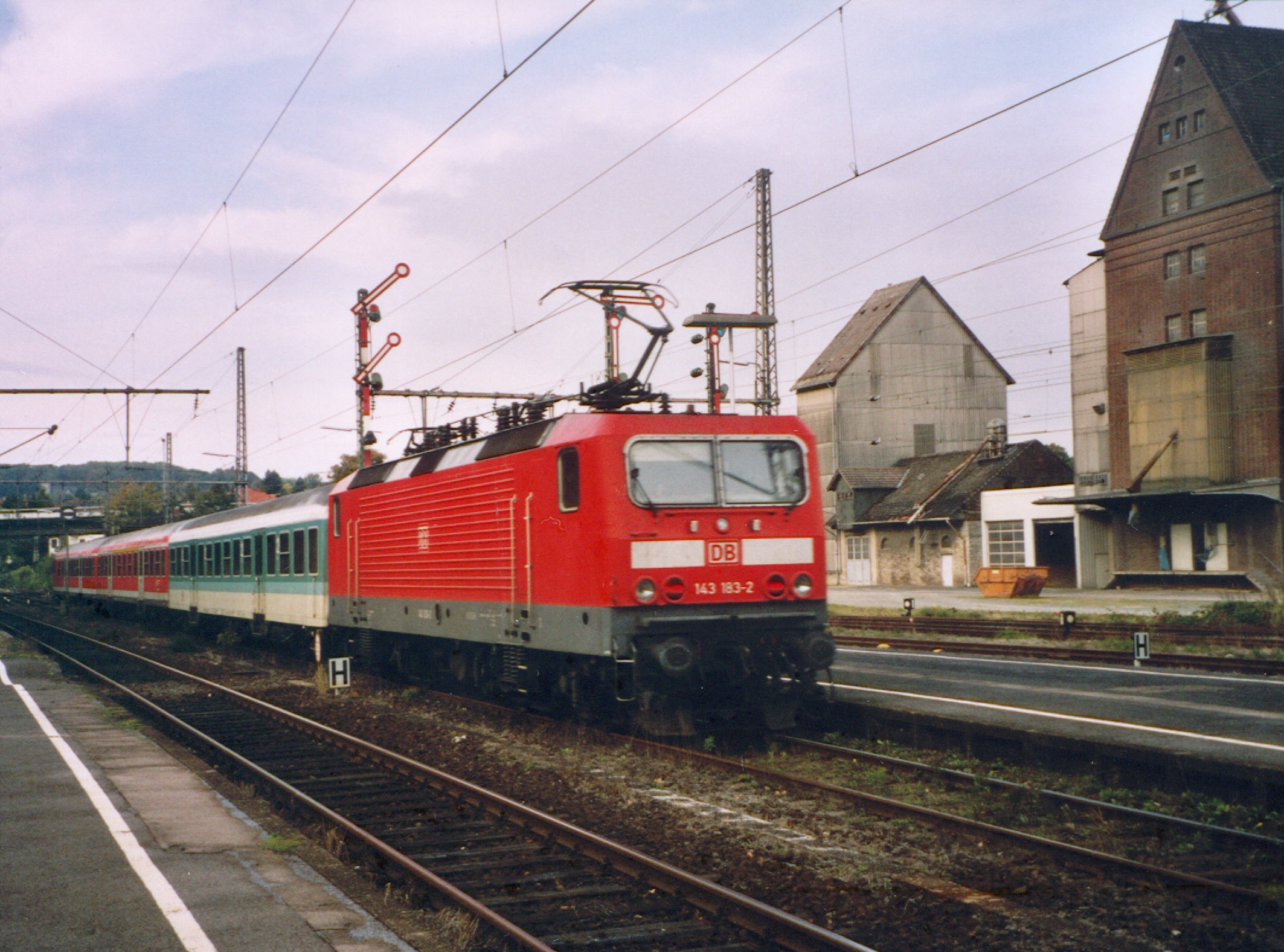
143 183-2 leaves Lage station with RB to Herford in November 2004

In local transport, for a long time there were also services over regional routes, for instance to Rahden, Bremen, Bad Bentheim, Löhne and Bielefeld. After the gradually introduction a regular-interval service, which culminated in NRW-Takt (North Rhine-Westphalia's current co-ordinated regular-interval service), the trains ran every hour on the Paderborn–Detmold–Herford route and continued alternately to/from Bielefeld (RB 72, Ostwestfalen-Bahn, "East Westphalian railway") or Bad Bentheim (RB 62, Der Cherusker, "The Cherusci"). An additional route ran, and continues to run, south of Lage as the RE 82 service, Der Leineweber ("The Weavers") on the (Münster –) Bielefeld – Oerlinghausen – Lage – Detmold – Altenbeken route. The latter was operated from December 2003 to December 1913 by the NordWestBahn, which earlier won a tender of the Zweckverband SPNV Münsterland (ZVM), Zweckverband Verkehrsverbund OWL (VVOWL) and Nahverkehrsverbund Paderborn-Höxter (NPH) transport associations. It is now operated by eurobahn.

Hourly interchange between the RB 61 (Wiehengebirgs-Bahn, "Wiehen Hills Railway") RB 62 and RB 72 in Herford ended in October 2004. Since then only the RB 61 Bielefeld–Bad Bentheim and the RB 72 Herford–Detmold–Paderborn operate hourly. Continuous connections between Osnabrück and Altenbeken and between Bielefeld and Bad Salzuflen no longer exist. Since 9 December 2007, these two lines are operated by WestfalenBahn as a result of being put to tender by the ZVM, VVOWL, NPH and Landesnahverkehrsgesellschaft Niedersachsen (LNVG) transport associations. After another call for tenders by the state of North Rhine-Westphalia, Eurobahn took over the operation of the Teutoburger-Wald-Netz (network) from December 2017 and with it the RB 72 service.

=== Freight ===
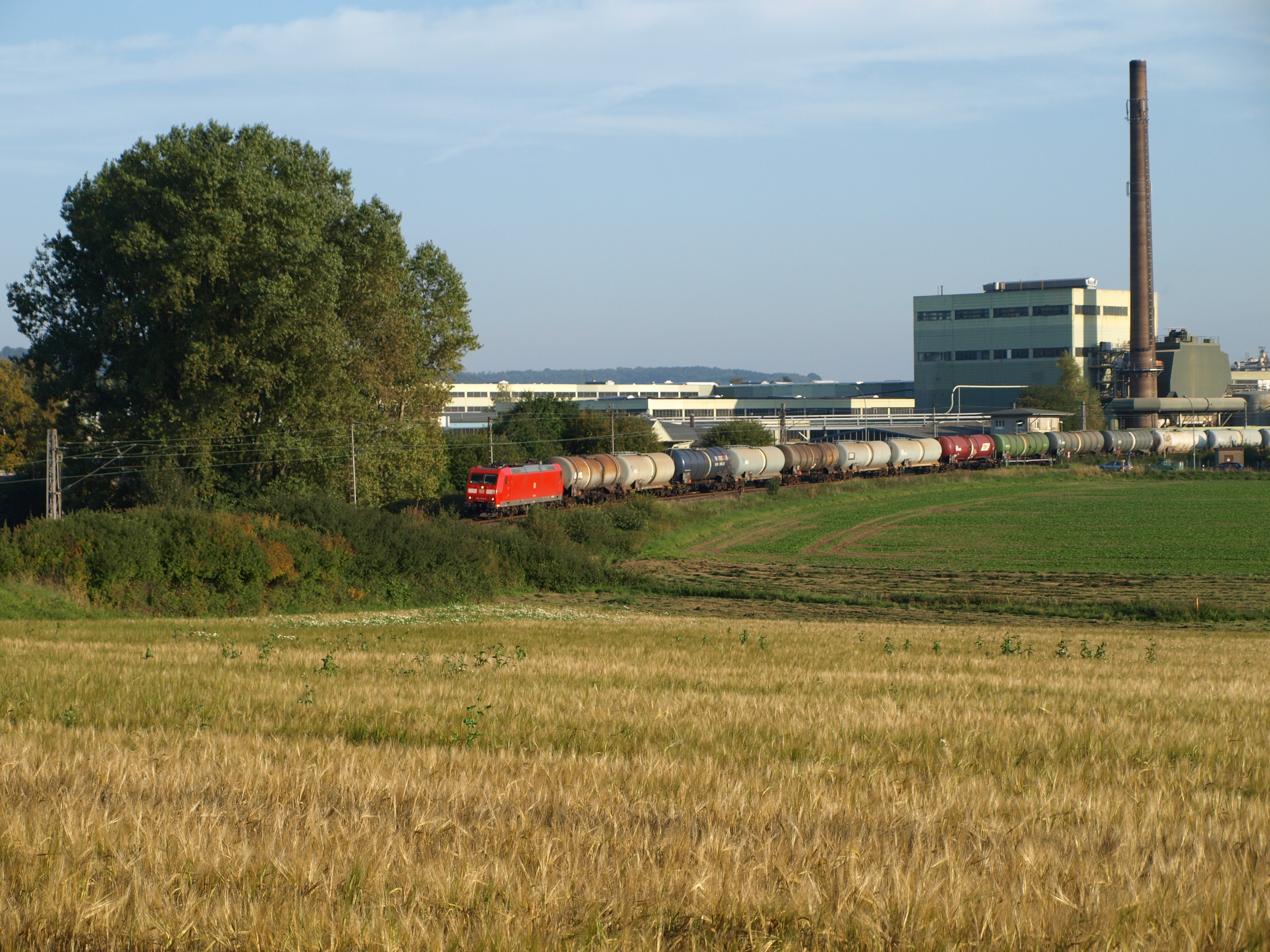
DGS 64000 Kassel - Holthausen leaving Horn-Bad Meinberg station on 26 September 2008

Freight traffic was formerly conveyed by regional transfer trains on regional routes. From its formation, sugar beet was transported in the autumn, which led to the construction of the road bridge over the northern end of Lage station. Lage and Detmold long each had their own small locomotive to service the local sidings. Today, service trips still run on working days from Paderborn to Detmold. They serve local customers in Sandebeck (Kronospan), Horn-Bad Meinberg (Glunz, formerly Hornitex) and Detmold.

=== Rolling stock ===
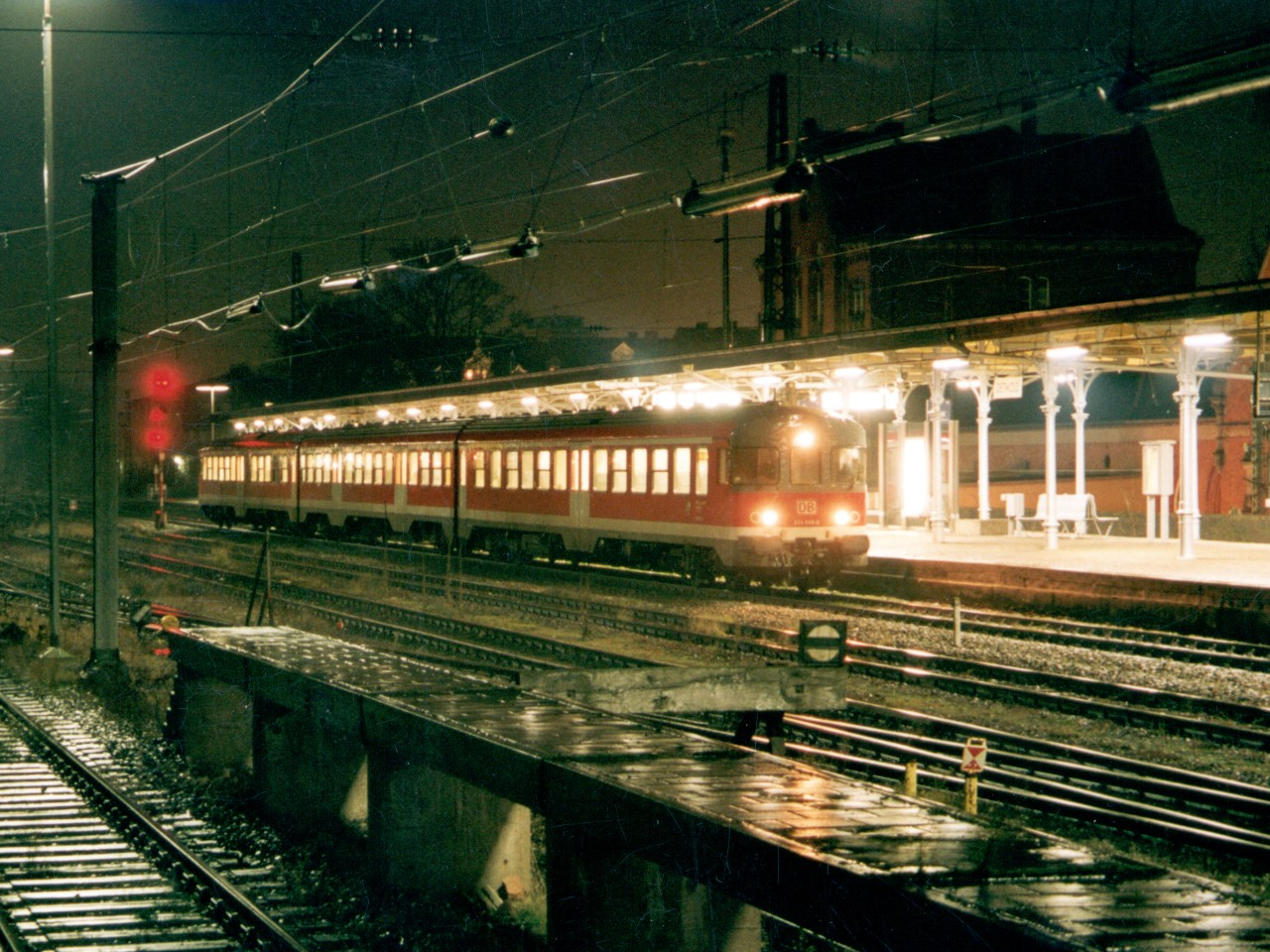
624 railcar as RE 82, Altenbeken - Bielefeld, on 11 December 2003 in Detmold

After electrification operations on the line were dominated by electric rolling stock, especially by Deutsche Bundesbahn classes 110, 140 and for decades by class 141, but classes 211, 216, 290/291 and crucially class 624 operated on the line. The locomotive-hauled trains were mainly used with Silberling carriages as push-pull trains.

After 2000, new electric railcars of class 425 were increasingly supplemented by diesel multiple units of various classes, especially south of Lage with classes 624, 628, 640 (Alstom Coradia LINT 27) and 643 (Bombardier Talent). Currently, the RB 72 is operated by WestfalenBahn with three-part Stadler FLIRT electric multiple units at speeds of up to 160 km/h. NordWestBahn operates the RE 82 service south of Lage using Talent DMUs at speeds of up to 120 km/h.

== Operations ==
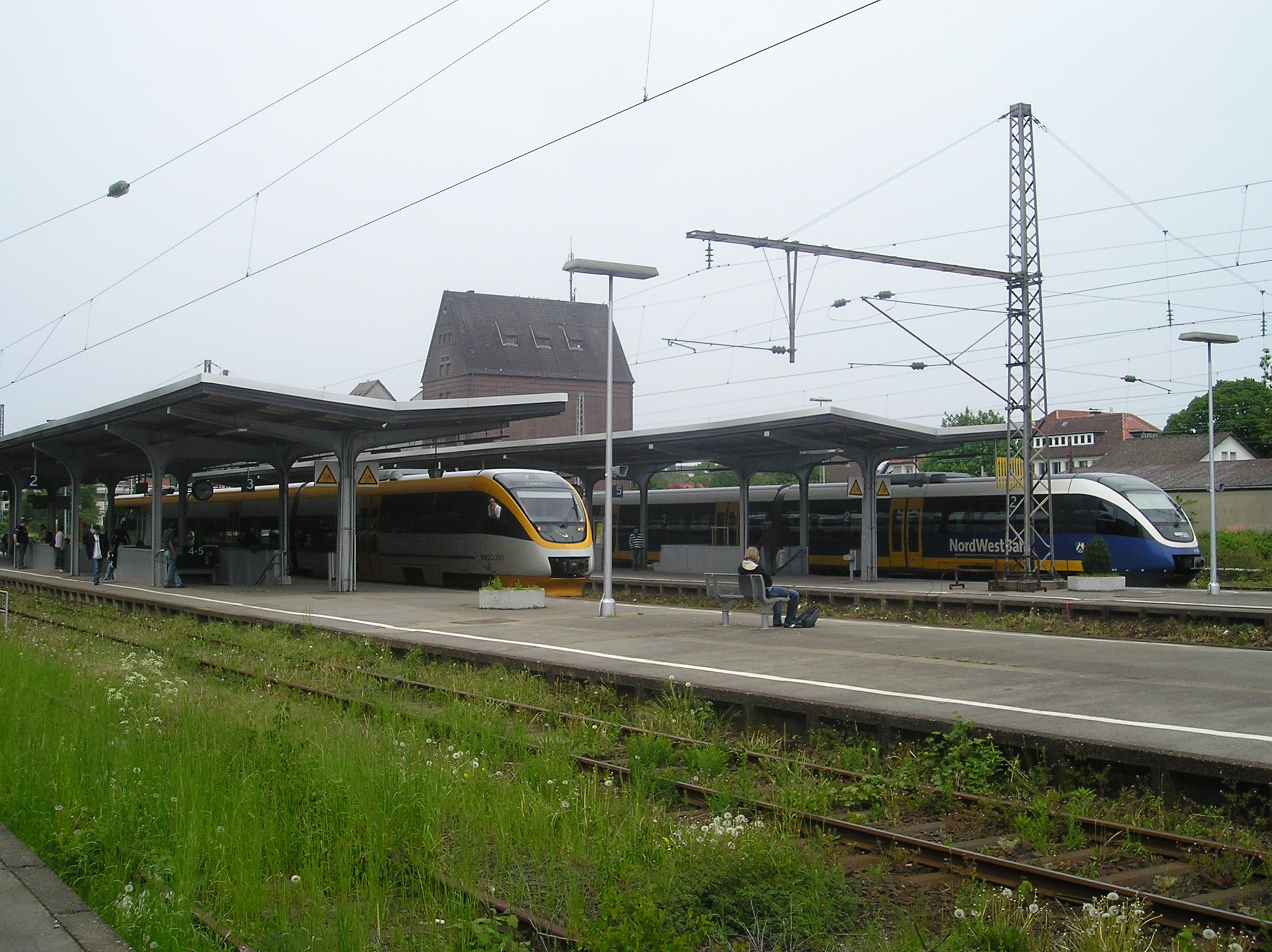
Trains crossing in Lage with Eurobahn service to Lemgo and Nordwestbahn service to Bielefeld on 15 May 2006.

The route is served every hour by RB 72 (Ostwestfalen-Bahn), Herford–Altenbeken–Paderborn and between Lage and Altenbeken by RE 82 (Der Leineweber) Bielefeld–Detmold (–Altenbeken). The RE 82 runs to Detmold every hour, but only every two hours on Sundays, and every day a section continues every two hours to Altenbeken, connecting with three Intercity-Express or Intercity services each day running via Kassel.

In the 2008 timetable a continuous train on the Bad Bentheim–Detmold route was reintroduced in the late evenings (on weekends to Paderborn), but running under two train numbers and not so far branded as Der Cherusker (RB 62), which continues to be in abeyance. The RE 82 connects in Bielefeld with the RB 67 (Der Warendorfer) to Münster. The services are operated by the WestfalenBahn and NordWestBahn. The average speed of the RE 82 between Bielefeld and Altenbeken is 62 km/h.

== Fares ==
The northern section to Leopoldstal is covered by Zweckverband Verkehrsverbund OWL fares, the southern section is covered by Nahverkehrsverbund Paderborn-Höxter fares and the whole area is covered by NRW-tariff fares.

== Detmold Military Railway ==
In 1946, the British Army of the Rhine took over the line from Deutsche Reichsbahn and set up a training track where railway engineers could learn how to operate a German railway. Subsequently, the British took over the operational management of the line, both passenger and freight traffic and the operation of the signal boxes. 3 Railway Operating Group of the Royal Engineers was in charge. The management was undertaken by the 153 Railway Operating Coy, which was specifically stationed in Detmold for this purpose. The British Army operated British war locomotives of the Austerity class (wheel arrangement 2-8-0) to Detmold, but they were soon supplemented by seizing Reichsbahn locomotives and the Austerity locomotives were abandoned in 1947. the line was returned to German control in 1948, shortly before the founding of Deutsche Bundesbahn.
