= Hartford High School (Kansas) =

Hartford Junior–Senior High School

Location
- 100 Commercial Street, Suite B Hartford, Kansas 66854; United States
- Coordinates: 38°18.6046′N 95°57.4117′W

Information
- School type: Public, High School
- Motto: Creating the Future Today
- Opened: 1857
- Status: Open
- Sister school: Olpe High School
- School board: BOE website
- School district: Southern Lyon County USD 252
- Principal: Lewis Whitson
- Teaching staff: 11.50 (FTE)
- Grades: 6 through 12
- Gender: coed
- Enrollment: 99 (2023–2024)
- Average class size: 15
- Student to teacher ratio: 8.61
- Schedule type: Block
- Hours in school day: 7 hours, 15 minutes
- Colors: Red; Blue
- Athletics: Yes
- Athletics conference: Lyon County League
- Sports: Basketball, cheerleading, cross country, American football, golf, track and field, volleyball
- Mascot: Jaguars
- Nickname: Hartford Jaguars
- Rival: Olpe High School
- Yearbook: HHS Yearbook
- Affiliations: KSHSAA
- Athletics Director: Lance Bolen
- Website: www.usd252.org/hhs

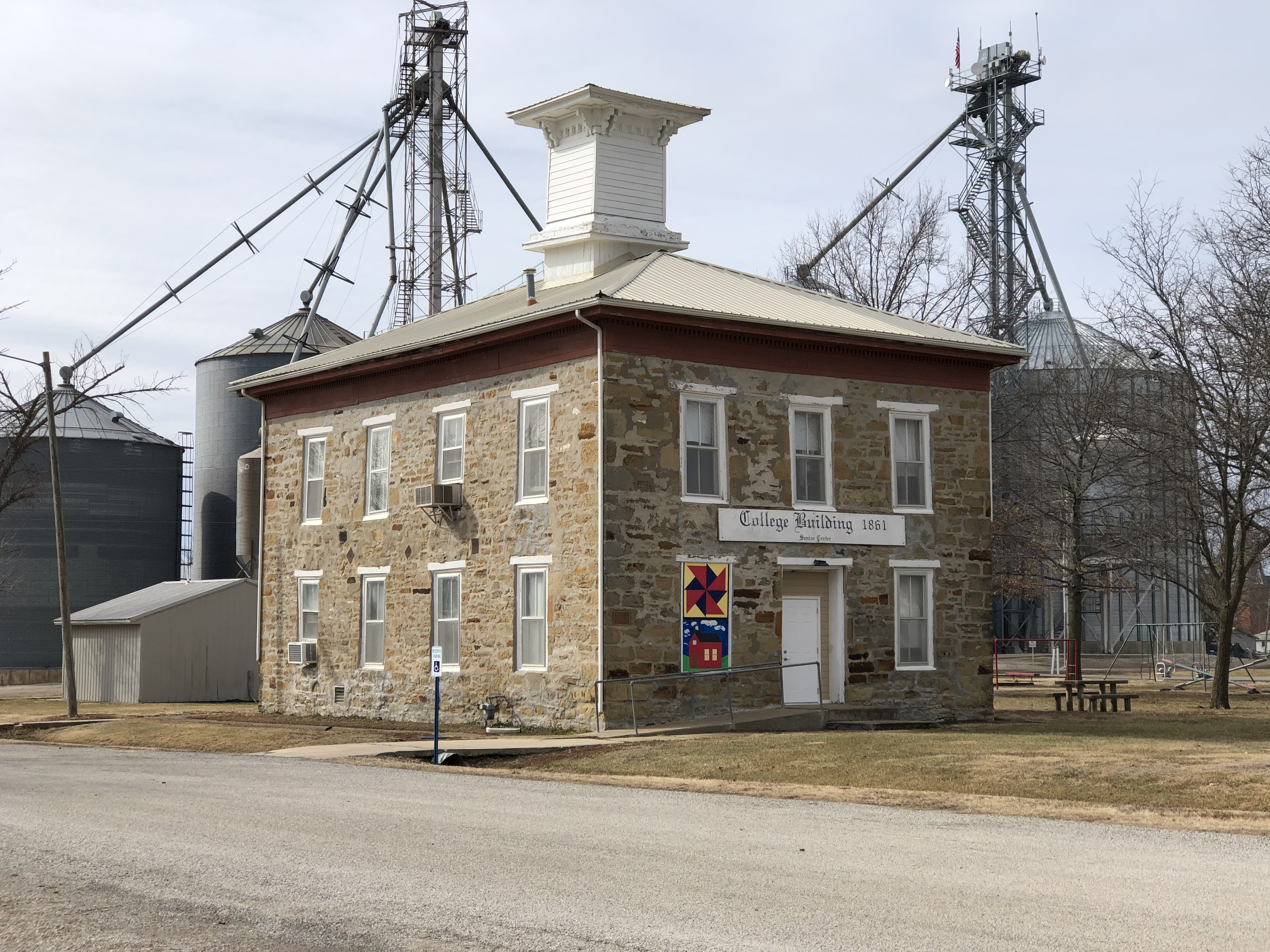
1861 Hartford Collegiate Institute building (2021)

Hartford Junior–Senior High School is a public junior and senior high school located in Hartford, Kansas, United States, in the Southern Lyon County USD 252 school district, serving students in grades 6-12. Hartford has an enrollment of approximately 130 students and a teaching staff of 21. The principal is Lewis Whitson. The school mascot is the Jaguar and the school colors are red and blue.

== History ==
The first school in Hartford began shortly after the town was founded in 1857 when Mrs. A.K. Hawkes, wife of one of the founders, taught school in her home. In 1861, the Neosho Valley Educational Association elected a board for the purpose of locating and founding an institution of learning. After several months of deliberation the Hartford Collegiate Institute was founded in December 1861 by that board. School actually began in the "Old College Building" on October 14, 1863, with Solomon Lewis as teacher.

By 1866 the school had grown to four teachers and 78 pupils. Thirty-three were classed as college preparatory, and forty-five were enrolled in the academic department. On April 8, 1867, Professor A.D. Chambers leased the building for 10 years and began an Academy. However the schism between the Methodist North and Methodist South churches and the hard times that hit in the 1870s made it difficult for him to maintain a school. The district school used the lower floor until 1877 when a two-story, four-room frame building was built in the northwest part of town. In 1883, an addition was made to this building.

During the 1880s, a two-year high school was established and classes were in the "old frame building". Later the length of high school was increased to a three-year course and several of the sons of the pioneers graduated in these two-year and three-year classes. The high school remained in the frame school building until 1903 when it was transferred to the "Old College Building" which the board of trustees of the Hartford Collegiate Institute had transferred to the Hartford High School Board.

In 1912, the high school was moved back into the old frame building where it remained until high school classes were moved into the newly built high school in the North part of town during the spring of 1916. The school originally was supported by District 25 and at times there was hardly enough money to operate; but the passage of the Barnes Law gave it new life. In 1921, District 25 consolidated with the Rummel district, known as "Frog Pond" under the title of Consolidated No. 1. In the spring of 1895 the first four-year class was graduated from Hartford High School. There were five graduates in the first class; two in 1896. In 1963, Hartford and Neosho Rapids consolidated, forming Hartford High School and Neosho Rapids Junior High School in the same building and Neosho Rapids Elementary in Neosho Rapids, Kansas. They also introduced the Jaguar as the new mascot. In 1965, Hartford, Neosho Rapids and Olpe consolidated to form Southern Lyon County USD 252.

== Sports ==
The Jaguars compete in the Lyon County League and are classified as 1A-Division II school, the lowest classification in Kansas according to KSHSAA. A majority of the sports are coached by the same coaches.

Hartford Junior–Senior High School offers the following sports:

Fall

- Boys' cross country
- Girls' cross country
- Fall cheerleading
- American football
- Volleyball

Winter

- Boys' basketball
- Girls' basketball
- Winter cheerleading

Spring

- Boys' track and field
- Girls' track and field

== Awards ==
Hartford Junior–Senior High School was recognized as a Blue Ribbon School by U.S. News & World Report as one of the top 43 schools in the State of Kansas preparing students for college. It received Standards of Excellence in reading, mathematics and science for several years.

== Notable alumni ==
- Francis G. Welch – former Emporia State Hornets football coach and athletic director
