= Hartford GAA =

Gaelic games club in Connecticut, United States

- Founded: 1914
- Grounds: Hartford, Connecticut

The Hartford Gaelic Athletic Association or Hartford GAA, is a Gaelic games club based in Connecticut. Founded in 1914, the club competes in Gaelic games competitions as part of the Northeast Division GAA Board.

== History ==
There are numerous references to hurling and football games in the archives of local Hartford newspapers stretching back to early in the twentieth century. The Hartford Gaelic team defeated Waterbury in 1914 to become State Champions and that the Kevin Barry Hurling Club was active in Hartford starting in the 1920s. Hartford has won a National Championship and many State Championships through the 1970s and 80s.

== Honours ==
2021 Northeast Junior C Football Champions
