= Siegfried Herford =

British mountain climber (1891–1916)

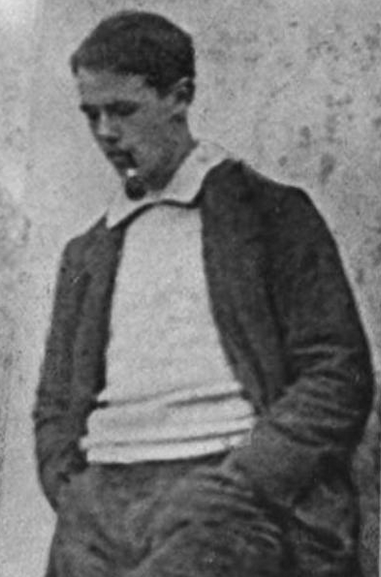
- Born: Siegfried Wedgwood Herford; 29 July 1891; Aberystwyth, England
- Died: 28 January 1916 (aged 24); France
- Cause of death: Killed in action
- Occupations: Student; Mountain climber
- Father: C. H. Herford
- Military career
- Allegiance: United Kingdom
- Branch: British Army
- Rank: Private
- Unit: Royal Fusiliers
- Conflicts: World War I: Western Front †

Siegfried Wedgwood Herford (29 July 1891 – 28 January 1916) was a British climber who was active in the years immediately before World War I. He and John Laycock and Stanley Jeffcoat initiated what is referred to as "gritstone climbing" in England, bouldering on large blocks at the base of the cliffs, and roping up to climb the edges and faces above.

== Early life ==
Siegfried Herford was born in 1891, the son of academic C. H. Herford. Siegfried enrolled at the University of Manchester in 1909, in the School of Engineering, and dabbled at rock climbing for a year or so. By 1911, he had invented the "girdle traverse", practising at Castle Naze in the Derbyshire Peak District before applying his concept to the face of Scafell. Although Herford spent considerable time on the crags, the quality of his academic work was superior, and he was at the top of his class in mathematics and physics when he graduated in 1912. He then received a postgraduate scholarship, which allowed him to do aeronautical research at the Royal Aircraft Factory at Farnborough.

== Expeditions ==
In the spring of 1914, Herford, with three companions, climbed the Central Buttress of Scafell, negotiating the crux—the notorious Flake Pitch—after reconnoitering the difficulties from above, as well as below. (Herford was an advocate of downclimbing, and wrote an article—"The Doctrine of Descent"—published in the 1913 Fell & Rock Climbing Club Journal.) Although some "combined tactics" were employed, the climb was a substantial benchmark in British rock climbing, coming in at HVS (5.9).

With the War in full swing, and having failed to obtain a commission due to his Teutonic heritage, Herford enlisted as a private in the Royal Fusiliers, and was killed by a grenade blast on 28 January 1916.
