= C. H. Herford =

19th/20th-century British literary scholar and critic

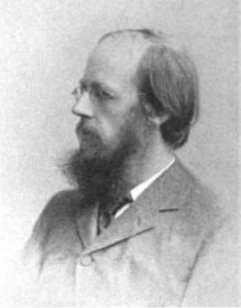
- In The Sketch, 16 February 1898
- Born: Charles Harold Herford; 18 February 1853; Manchester, England
- Died: 25 April 1931 (aged 78); Oxford, England
- Education: Trinity College, Cambridge
- Occupation(s): Scholar, critic
- Children: Siegfried Herford

Charles Harold Herford, FBA (18 February 1853 – 25 April 1931) was an English literary scholar and critic. He is remembered principally for his biography and edition of the works of Ben Jonson in 11 volumes. This major scholarly project was published from 1925 onwards by Oxford University Press, and completed with Percy and Evelyn Simpson. It took half a century, being agreed on in 1902.

== Life ==
He was born in Manchester, and matriculated at Trinity College, Cambridge in 1875, graduating B.A. in 1879, M.A. in 1883. He was Professor at University College of Wales, Aberystwyth from 1887 to 1901, and Professor of English Literature at Victoria University of Manchester from 1901 to 1921.

His son Siegfried Herford, a successful mountain climber and aeronautical researcher, was killed in combat in World War I.

C. H. Herford died in Oxford on 25 April 1931.

== Works ==
- The Social History of the English Drama (1881)
- Studies in the Literary Relations of England and Germany in the Sixteenth Century (1886)
- Shakespeare's Masters and As You Like It (1890)
- Spencer's The shepheards calendar (1895)
- The Age of Wordsworth (1897)
- The Eversley Shakespeare, in 10 volumes (1899) editor
- English Tales in Verse (1902)
- Robert Browning (1905)
- The Collected Works of Henrik Ibsen (1906) editor
- The Bearing of English Studies upon the National Life (1910) pamphlet
- The Intellectual and Literary History of Germany in the nineteenth Century (1912) in Germany in the Nineteenth Century, with E. C. K. Gonner, J. H. Rose and M. E. Sadler
- Goethe (1913)
- Is there a poetic view of the world? (1916) Warton Lecture on English Poetry
- The lyrical poems of Percy Bysshe Shelley (1916) editor
- Norse myth in English poetry (1919)
- The Normality of Shakespeare Illustrated in his Treatment of Love and Marriage (1920) pamphlet
- The dramatic poems of Shelley (1922) editor
- Dante and Milton (1924)
- Ben Jonson, ed. C. H. Herford and Percy Simpson (Oxford University Press 1925-1953) and Evelyn Simpson
- The narrative poems of Percy Bysshe Shelley (1927) editor
- English Literature (1927)
- The Post-War Mind of Germany, and other European Essays (1927)
- Wordsworth (1929)
