= 2011–12 Chicago Blackhawks season =

National Hockey League team season

2011–12 Chicago Blackhawks
- Division: 4th Central
- Conference: 6th Western
- 2011–12 record: 45–26–11
- Home record: 27–8–6
- Road record: 18–18–5
- Goals for: 248
- Goals against: 238

Team information
- General manager: Stan Bowman
- Coach: Joel Quenneville
- Captain: Jonathan Toews
- Alternate captains: Duncan Keith; Patrick Sharp
- Arena: United Center
- Average attendance: 21,533 (109.2%); Total: 882,874

Team leaders
- Goals: Patrick Sharp (33)
- Assists: Marian Hossa (48)
- Points: Marian Hossa (77)
- Penalty minutes: Jamal Mayers (91)
- Plus/minus: Patrick Sharp (+28)
- Wins: Corey Crawford (30)
- Goals against average: Corey Crawford (2.72)

The 2011–12 Chicago Blackhawks season was the 86th season for the National Hockey League (NHL) franchise that was established on September 25, 1926.

== Off-season ==
On May 19, 2011, goaltender Corey Crawford signed a three-year, $8 million contract.

== Regular season ==
On March 31, 2012, the Blackhawks clinched a playoff spot with a 5–4 victory over the Nashville Predators. This marks the Blackhawks fourth consecutive season making the playoffs.

== Playoffs ==
The Blackhawks returned to the playoffs for the fourth straight season. The Blackhawks lost in the first round, losing to the Phoenix Coyotes in six games.

== Standings ==
Central Division
Pos	Team	GP	W	L	OTL	ROW	GF	GA	GD	Pts
1	y – St. Louis Blues	82	49	22	11	45	210	165	+45	109
2	x – Nashville Predators	82	48	26	8	43	237	210	+27	104
3	x – Detroit Red Wings	82	48	28	6	39	248	203	+45	102
4	x – Chicago Blackhawks	82	45	26	11	38	248	238	+10	101
5	Columbus Blue Jackets	82	29	46	7	25	202	262	−60	65

Source: National Hockey League
x – Clinched playoff spot; y – Clinched division

Western Conference
Pos	Div	Team	GP	W	L	OTL	ROW	GF	GA	GD	Pts
1	NW	p – Vancouver Canucks	82	51	22	9	43	249	198	+51	111
2	CE	y – St. Louis Blues	82	49	22	11	45	210	165	+45	109
3	PA	y – Phoenix Coyotes	82	42	27	13	36	216	204	+12	97
4	CE	x – Nashville Predators	82	48	26	8	43	237	210	+27	104
5	CE	x – Detroit Red Wings	82	48	28	6	39	248	203	+45	102
6	CE	x – Chicago Blackhawks	82	45	26	11	38	248	238	+10	101
7	PA	x – San Jose Sharks	82	43	29	10	34	228	210	+18	96
8	PA	x – Los Angeles Kings	82	40	27	15	34	194	179	+15	95
9	NW	Calgary Flames	82	37	29	16	34	202	226	−24	90
10	PA	Dallas Stars	82	42	35	5	35	211	222	−11	89
11	NW	Colorado Avalanche	82	41	35	6	32	208	220	−12	88
12	NW	Minnesota Wild	82	35	36	11	24	177	226	−49	81
13	PA	Anaheim Ducks	82	34	36	12	31	204	231	−27	80
14	NW	Edmonton Oilers	82	32	40	10	27	212	239	−27	74
15	CE	Columbus Blue Jackets	82	29	46	7	25	202	262	−60	65

Source: National Hockey League
p – Clinched Presidents' Trophy; x – Clinched playoff spot; y – Clinched division

== Schedule and results ==
Legend: Win (2 points) Loss (0 points) Overtime/shootout loss (1 point)

=== Pre-season ===
2011 Pre-season : 2–4–1 (Home: 2–2–0; Road: 0–2–1)
#	Date	Opponent	Score	OT	Decision	Arena	Attendance	Record	Recap
1	September 20*	Edmonton Oilers	4–2		Salak	Credit Union Centre	N/A	0–1–0	L1
2	September 22	@ Pittsburgh Penguins	4–1		Emery	Consol Energy Center	17,738	0–2–0	L2
3	September 23	Washington Capitals	3–2		Crawford	United Center	19,798	1–2–0	W1
4	September 25	@ Detroit Red Wings	4–3	SO	Salak	Joe Louis Arena	14,734	1–2–1	OTL1
5	September 28	Detroit Red Wings	4–3		Crawford	United Center	20,078	2–2–1	W1
6	September 30	Pittsburgh Penguins	4–2		Crawford	United Center	20,114	2–3–1	L1
7	October 2	@ Washington Capitals	4–1		Emery	Verizon Center	18,405	2–4–1	L2
*Played in Saskatoon, Saskatchewan, Canada.

=== Regular season ===
2011–12 Season

October: 7–2–2 (Home: 5–0–2; Road: 2–2–0) Pts. 16
#	Date	Opponent	Score	OT	Decision	Arena	Attendance	Record	Pts	Recap
1	October 7	@ Dallas Stars	2–1		Crawford	American Airlines Center	15,285	0–1–0	0	L1
2	October 8	Dallas Stars	5–2		Crawford	United Center	21,674	1–1–0	2	W1
3	October 13	Winnipeg Jets	4–3		Emery	United Center	21,175	2–1–0	4	W2
4	October 15	Boston Bruins	3–2	SO	Crawford	United Center	22,073	2–1–1	5	OTL1
5	October 18	@ Phoenix Coyotes	5–2		Crawford	Jobing.com Arena	11,051	3–1–1	7	W1
6	October 20	@ Colorado Avalanche	3–1		Crawford	Pepsi Center	17,523	4–1–1	9	W2
7	October 22	Colorado Avalanche	5–4	SO	Crawford	United Center	21,328	4–1–2	10	OTL1
8	October 25	Anaheim Ducks	3–2	SO	Crawford	United Center	21,247	5–1–2	12	W1
9	October 28	@ Carolina Hurricanes	3–0		Crawford	RBC Center	16,056	5–2–2	12	L1
10	October 29	Columbus Blue Jackets	5–2		Emery	United Center	21,114	6–2–2	14	W1
11	October 31	Nashville Predators	5–4	OT	Crawford	United Center	20,721	7–2–2	16	W2

November: 7–6–1 (Home: 2–2–0; Road: 5–4–1) Pts. 15
#	Date	Opponent	Score	OT	Decision	Arena	Attendance	Record	Pts	Recap
12	November 3	@ Florida Panthers	3–2	SO	Crawford	BankAtlantic Center	15,929	8–2–2	18	W3
13	November 4	@ Tampa Bay Lightning	5–4	OT	Emery	St. Pete Times Forum	19,204	8–2–3	19	OTL1
14	November 6	Vancouver Canucks	6–2		Crawford	United Center	21,883	8–3–3	19	L1
15	November 8	@ St. Louis Blues	3–0		Crawford	Scottrade Center	19,150	8–4–3	19	L2
16	November 10	@ Columbus Blue Jackets	6–3		Crawford	Nationwide Arena	15,048	9–4–3	21	W1
17	November 11	Calgary Flames	4–1		Emery	United Center	21,720	10–4–3	23	W2
18	November 13	Edmonton Oilers	6–3		Crawford	United Center	21,110	11–4–3	25	W3
19	November 16	@ Vancouver Canucks	5–1		Crawford	Rogers Arena	18,860	12–4–3	27	W4
20	November 18	@ Calgary Flames	5–2		Crawford	Scotiabank Saddledome	19,289	12–5–3	27	L1
21	November 19	@ Edmonton Oilers	9–2		Emery	Rexall Place	16,839	12–6–3	27	L2
22	November 23	@ San Jose Sharks	1–0		Crawford	HP Pavilion at San Jose	17,562	12–7–3	27	L3
23	November 25	@ Anaheim Ducks	6–5		Crawford	Honda Center	17,174	13–7–3	29	W1
24	November 26	@ Los Angeles Kings	2–1		Crawford	Staples Center	18,118	14–7–3	31	W2
25	November 29	Phoenix Coyotes	4–1		Crawford	United Center	21,183	14–8–3	31	L1

December: 10–2–1 (Home: 7–1–1; Road: 3–1–0) Pts. 21
#	Date	Opponent	Score	OT	Decision	Arena	Attendance	Record	Pts	Recap
26	December 2	New York Islanders	5–4	SO	Crawford	United Center	21,468	15–8–3	33	W1
27	December 3	@ St. Louis Blues	5–2		Emery	Scottrade Center	19,150	16–8–3	35	W2
28	December 5	Phoenix Coyotes	4–3	SO	Emery	United Center	21,079	16–8–4	36	OTL1
29	December 8	@ New York Islanders	3–2	OT	Emery	Nassau Coliseum	10,711	17–8–4	38	W1
30	December 11	San Jose Sharks	3–2	OT	Emery	United Center	21,456	18–8–4	40	W2
31	December 14	@ Minnesota Wild	4–3	SO	Emery	Xcel Energy Center	19,254	19–8–4	42	W3
32	December 16	Anaheim Ducks	4–1		Emery	United Center	21,528	20–8–4	44	W4
33	December 18	Calgary Flames	4–2		Emery	United Center	21,192	21–8–4	46	W5
34	December 20	@ Pittsburgh Penguins	3–2		Emery	Consol Energy Center	18,607	21–9–4	46	L1
35	December 21	Montreal Canadiens	5–1		Crawford	United Center	22,081	22–9–4	48	W1
36	December 26	Columbus Blue Jackets	4–1		Crawford	United Center	21,645	23–9–4	50	W2
37	December 28	Los Angeles Kings	2–0		Crawford	United Center	22,066	23–10–4	50	L1
38	December 30	Detroit Red Wings	3–2		Crawford	United Center	22,166	24–10–4	52	W1

January: 5–5–3 (Home: 5–3–1; Road: 0–2–2) Pts. 13
#	Date	Opponent	Score	OT	Decision	Arena	Attendance	Record	Pts	Recap
39	January 2	Edmonton Oilers	4–3		Crawford	United Center	21,216	24–11–4	52	L1
40	January 5	@ Philadelphia Flyers	5–4		Emery	Wells Fargo Center	19,877	24–12–4	52	L2
41	January 6	Colorado Avalanche	4–0		Crawford	United Center	21,807	24–13–4	52	L3
42	January 8	Detroit Red Wings	3–2	OT	Crawford	United Center	21,858	24–13–5	53	OTL1
43	January 10	Columbus Blue Jackets	5–2		Crawford	United Center	21,229	25–13–5	55	W1
44	January 12	Minnesota Wild	5–2		Emery	United Center	21,490	26–13–5	57	W2
45	January 14	@ Detroit Red Wings	3–2	OT	Crawford	Joe Louis Arena	20,066	26–13–6	58	OTL1
46	January 15	San Jose Sharks	4–3		Crawford	United Center	21,645	27–13–6	60	W1
47	January 18	Buffalo Sabres	6–2		Crawford	United Center	21,114	28–13–6	62	W2
48	January 20	Florida Panthers	3–1		Emery	United Center	21,555	29–13–6	64	W3
49	January 21	@ Nashville Predators	5–2		Crawford	Bridgestone Arena	17,113	29–14–6	64	L1
50	January 24	Nashville Predators	3–1		Crawford	United Center	21,279	29–15–6	64	L2
51	January 31	@ Vancouver Canucks	3–2	OT	Crawford	Rogers Arena	18,890	29–15–7	65	OTL1

February: 5–9–0 (Home: 3–1–0; Road: 2–8–0) Pts. 10
#	Date	Opponent	Score	OT	Decision	Arena	Attendance	Record	Pts	Recap
52	February 2	@ Edmonton Oilers	8–4		Crawford	Rexall Place	16,839	29–16–7	65	L1
53	February 3	@ Calgary Flames	3–1		Emery	Scotiabank Saddledome	19,289	29–17–7	65	L2
54	February 7	@ Colorado Avalanche	5–2		Emery	Pepsi Center	16,553	29–18–7	65	L3
55	February 10	@ San Jose Sharks	5–3		Crawford	HP Pavilion at San Jose	17,562	29–19–7	65	L4
56	February 11	@ Phoenix Coyotes	3–0		Emery	Jobing.com Arena	17,353	29–20–7	65	L5
57	February 14	@ Nashville Predators	3–2		Emery	Bridgestone Arena	16,592	29–21–7	65	L6
58	February 16	@ New York Rangers	4–2		Crawford	Madison Square Garden	18,200	30–21–7	67	W1
59	February 18	@ Columbus Blue Jackets	6–1		Crawford	Nationwide Arena	18,663	31–21–7	69	W2
60	February 19	St. Louis Blues	3–1		Crawford	United Center	22,077	32–21–7	71	W3
61	February 21	Detroit Red Wings	2–1		Crawford	United Center	22,027	33–21–7	73	W4
62	February 23	Dallas Stars	3–1		Crawford	United Center	21,659	33–22–7	73	L1
63	February 25	@ Los Angeles Kings	4–0		Crawford	Staples Center	18,118	33–23–7	73	L2
64	February 26	@ Anaheim Ducks	3–1		Emery	Honda Center	17,601	33–24–7	73	L3
65	February 29	Toronto Maple Leafs	5–4		Emery	United Center	21,244	34–24–7	75	W1

March: 10–2–2 (Home: 5–1–1; Road: 5–1–1) Pts. 22
#	Date	Opponent	Score	OT	Decision	Arena	Attendance	Record	Pts	Recap
66	March 2	@ Ottawa Senators	2–1		Emery	Scotiabank Place	18,788	35–24–7	77	W2
67	March 4	@ Detroit Red Wings	2–1		Emery	Joe Louis Arena	20,066	36–24–7	79	W3
68	March 6	@ St. Louis Blues	5–1		Emery	Scottrade Center	19,150	36–25–7	79	L1
69	March 9	New York Rangers	4–3		Emery	United Center	22,049	37–25–7	81	W1
70	March 11	Los Angeles Kings	3–2	SO	Emery	United Center	21,398	37–25–8	82	OTL1
71	March 13	St. Louis Blues	4–3	SO	Crawford	United Center	21,349	38–25–8	84	W1
72	March 16	@ Dallas Stars	4–1		Crawford	American Airlines Center	19,099	39–25–8	86	W2
73	March 18	Washington Capitals	5–2		Crawford	United Center	21,561	40–25–8	88	W3
74	March 20	@ Columbus Blue Jackets	5–1		Crawford	Nationwide Arena	15,311	41–25–8	90	W4
75	March 21	Vancouver Canucks	2–1	OT	Crawford	United Center	21,715	42–25–8	92	W5
76	March 25	Nashville Predators	6–1		Crawford	United Center	21,463	42–26–8	92	L1
77	March 27	@ New Jersey Devils	2–1	SO	Crawford	Prudential Center	15,074	42–26–9	93	OTL1
78	March 29	St. Louis Blues	4–3	SO	Crawford	United Center	21,659	43–26–9	95	W1
79	March 31	@ Nashville Predators	5–4		Crawford	Bridgestone Arena	17,113	44–26–9	97	W2

April: 1–0–2 (Home: 0–0–1; Road: 1–0–1) Pts. 4
#	Date	Opponent	Score	OT	Decision	Arena	Attendance	Record	Pts	Recap
80	April 1	Minnesota Wild	5–4	SO	Emery	United Center	21,576	44–26–10	98	OTL1
81	April 5	@ Minnesota Wild	2–1	SO	Crawford	Xcel Energy Center	18,643	44–26–11	99	OTL2
82	April 7	@ Detroit Red Wings	3–2	SO	Crawford	Joe Louis Arena	20,066	45–26–11	101	W1

=== Playoffs ===
This was the fourth consecutive season that the Blackhawks clinched a playoff berth.

2012 Stanley Cup playoffs

Western Conference Quarterfinals vs. Phoenix Coyotes (3) – Blackhawks lost series 4–2
Game	Date	Opponent	Score	OT	Decision	Arena	Attendance	Series	Recap
1	April 12	@ Phoenix Coyotes	3–2	9:29 OT	Crawford	Jobing.com Arena	17,138	0–1	L1
2	April 14	@ Phoenix Coyotes	4–3	10:36 OT	Crawford	Jobing.com Arena	17,539	1–1	W1
3	April 17	Phoenix Coyotes	3–2	13:15 OT	Crawford	United Center	21,627	1–2	L1
4	April 19	Phoenix Coyotes	3–2	2:15 OT	Crawford	United Center	22,111	1–3	L2
5	April 21	@ Phoenix Coyotes	2–1	2:44 OT	Crawford	Jobing.com Arena	17,746	2–3	W1
6	April 23	Phoenix Coyotes	4–0		Crawford	United Center	21,636	2–4	L1

Legend: Win Loss

=== Detailed records ===
Western Conference
Opponent	Home	Away	Total	Pts.	Goals scored	Goals allowed
Central Division
Chicago Blackhawks	–	–	–	–	–	–
Columbus Blue Jackets	3–0–0	3–0–0	6–0–0	12	31	10
Detroit Red Wings	2–0–1	2–0–1	4–0–2	10	14	12
Nashville Predators	1–2–0	1–2–0	2–4–0	4	16	25
St. Louis Blues	3–0–0	1–2–0	4–2–0	8	17	17
	9–2–1	7–4–1	16–6–2	34	78	64
Northwest Division
Calgary Flames	2–0–0	0–2–0	2–2–0	4	11	11
Colorado Avalanche	0–1–1	1–1–0	1–2–1	3	9	15
Edmonton Oilers	1–1–0	0–2–0	1–3–0	2	15	24
Minnesota Wild	1–0–1	1–0–1	2–0–2	6	15	12
Vancouver Canucks	1–1–0	1–0–1	2–1–1	5	11	11
	5–3–2	3–5–2	8–8–4	19	61	73
Pacific Division
Anaheim Ducks	2–0–0	1–1–0	3–1–0	6	14	11
Dallas Stars	1–1–0	1–1–0	2–2–0	4	11	8
Los Angeles Kings	0–1–1	1–1–0	1–2–1	3	4	10
Phoenix Coyotes	0–1–1	1–1–0	1–2–1	3	9	13
San Jose Sharks	2–0–0	0–2–0	2–2–0	4	10	11
	5–3–2	4–6–0	9–9–2	20	50	53

Eastern Conference
Opponent	Home	Away	Total	Pts.	Goals scored	Goals allowed
Atlantic Division
New Jersey Devils	0–0–0	0–0–1	0–0–1	1	1	2
New York Islanders	1–0–0	1–0–0	2–0–0	4	8	6
New York Rangers	1–0–0	1–0–0	2–0–0	4	8	5
Philadelphia Flyers	0–0–0	0–1–0	0–1–0	0	4	5
Pittsburgh Penguins	0–0–0	0–1–0	0–1–0	0	2	3
	2–0–0	2–2–1	4–2–1	9	23	21
Northeast Division
Boston Bruins	0–0–1	0–0–0	0–0–1	1	2	3
Buffalo Sabres	1–0–0	0–0–0	1–0–0	2	6	2
Montreal Canadiens	1–0–0	0–0–0	1–0–0	2	5	1
Ottawa Senators	0–0–0	1–0–0	1–0–0	2	2	1
Toronto Maple Leafs	1–0–0	0–0–0	1–0–0	2	5	4
	3–0–1	1–0–0	4–0–1	9	20	11
Southeast Division
Carolina Hurricanes	0–0–0	0–1–0	0–1–0	0	0	3
Florida Panthers	1–0–0	1–0–0	2–0–0	4	6	3
Tampa Bay Lightning	0–0–0	0–0–1	0–0–1	1	4	5
Washington Capitals	1–0–0	0–0–0	1–0–0	2	5	2
Winnipeg Jets	1–0–0	0–0–0	1–0–0	2	4	3
	3–0–0	1–1–1	4–1–1	9	19	16

== Player statistics ==
=== Skaters ===
Note: Pos = Position; GP = Games played; G = Goals; A = Assists; Pts = Points; PIM = Penalty minutes; +/- = Plus/minus; PPG = Power-play goals; SHG = Short-handed goals; GWG = Game-winning goals

Regular season

Player	GP	G	A	Pts	+/−	PIM
Marian Hossa	81	29	48	77	18	20
Patrick Sharp	74	33	36	69	28	38
Patrick Kane	82	23	43	66	7	40
Jonathan Toews	59	29	28	57	17	28
Viktor Stalberg	79	22	21	43	6	34
Duncan Keith	74	4	36	40	15	42
Dave Bolland	76	19	18	37	0	47
Nick Leddy	82	3	34	37	-12	10
Brent Seabrook	78	9	25	34	21	22
Andrew Brunette	78	12	15	27	-13	4
Marcus Kruger	71	9	17	26	11	22
Bryan Bickell	71	9	15	24	-3	48
Andrew Shaw	37	12	11	23	-1	50
Michael Frolik	63	5	10	15	-10	22
Niklas Hjalmarsson	69	1	14	15	9	14
Jamal Mayers	81	6	9	15	-4	91
Steve Montador	52	5	9	14	4	45
Daniel Carcillo	28	2	9	11	10	82
Jimmy Hayes	31	5	4	9	-3	16
Sean O'Donnell	51	0	7	7	-6	23
Johnny Oduya^{†}	18	1	4	5	3	0
Sami Lepisto	26	1	2	3	3	4
Ben Smith	13	2	0	2	-5	0
Brandon Pirri	5	0	2	2	2	0
John Scott^{‡}	29	0	1	1	0	48
Dylan Olsen	28	0	1	1	-5	6
Brandon Bollig	18	0	0	0	-2	58
Brendan Morrison^{†}	11	0	0	0	-4	6
Rostislav Olesz	6	0	0	0	-1	6
Jeremy Morin	3	0	0	0	-1	0
Brandon Saad	2	0	0	0	0	0

Playoffs

Player	GP	G	A	Pts	+/−	PIM
Jonathan Toews	6	2	2	4	4	6
Patrick Kane	6	0	4	4	1	10
Michael Frolik	4	2	1	3	1	0
Nick Leddy	6	1	2	3	1	0
Brent Seabrook	6	1	2	3	1	0
Dave Bolland	6	0	3	3	0	2
Johnny Oduya	6	0	3	3	1	0
Viktor Stalberg	6	0	2	2	0	8
Bryan Bickell	6	2	0	2	-1	4
Brandon Bollig	4	1	0	1	0	19
Patrick Sharp	6	1	0	1	-2	4
Andrew Brunette	6	1	0	1	-3	0
Brendan Morrison	3	1	0	1	1	0
Brandon Saad	2	0	1	1	2	0
Niklas Hjalmarsson	6	0	1	1	-3	4
Duncan Keith	6	0	1	1	1	2
Marcus Kruger	6	0	0	0	-4	0
Andrew Shaw	3	0	0	0	-1	15
Marian Hossa	3	0	0	0	3	0
Jamal Mayers	3	0	0	0	-1	0
Sami Lepisto	3	0	0	0	-3	0
Jimmy Hayes	2	0	0	0	-1	15
Sean O'Donnell	2	0	0	0	-3	0
Dylan Olsen	1	0	0	0	0	0

=== Goaltenders ===
Note: GP = Games played; Min = Minutes played; W = Wins; L = Losses; OT = Overtime losses; GA = Goals against; GAA= Goals against average; SA= Shots against; SV= Saves; Sv% = Save percentage; SO= Shutouts

Regular season

Player	GP	Min	W	L	OT	GA	GAA	SA	Sv%	SO	G	A	PIM
Corey Crawford	57	3,218	30	17	7	146	2.72	1,507	.903	0	0	0	0
Ray Emery	34	1,774	15	9	4	83	2.81	834	.900	0	0	1	2

Playoffs

Player	GP	Min	W	L	GA	GAA	SA	Sv%	SO	G	A	PIM
Corey Crawford	6	396	2	4	17	2.58	159	.893	0	0	0	0

^{†}Denotes player spent time with another team before joining Blackhawks. Stats reflect time with the Blackhawks only.
^{‡}Traded or released mid-season
Bold/italics denotes franchise record

== Awards and records ==
=== Awards ===
Regular Season
Player	Award	Reached
Jonathan Toews	NHL Third Star of the Week	November 14, 2011
Jonathan Toews	NHL Second Star of the Month	November 2011
Viktor Stalberg	NHL Second Star of the Week	January 16, 2012
Ray Emery	NHL Third Star of the Week	March 5, 2012
Corey Crawford	NHL Second Star of the Week	March 19, 2012

=== Milestones ===
Regular season
Player	Milestone	Reached
Brandon Pirri	1st Career NHL Assist; 1st Career NHL Point	October 7, 2011
Brandon Saad	1st Career NHL Game	October 7, 2011
Marcus Kruger	1st Career NHL Assist; 1st Career NHL Point	October 8, 2011
Marian Hossa	900th Career NHL Game	October 13, 2011
Patrick Sharp	500th Career NHL Game	October 20, 2011
Niklas Hjalmarsson	200th Career NHL Game	October 28, 2011
Marcus Kruger	1st Career NHL Goal	October 29, 2011
Duncan Keith	500th Career NHL Game	November 11, 2011
Duncan Keith	200th Career NHL Assist	November 18, 2011
Daniel Carcillo	300th Career NHL Game	November 23, 2011
Brent Seabrook	200th Career NHL Point	December 2, 2011
Marian Hossa	400th Career NHL Goal	December 8, 2011
Brent Seabrook	500th Career NHL Game	December 11, 2011
Ray Emery	100th Career NHL Win	December 11, 2011
Jonathan Toews	300th Career NHL Point	December 14, 2011
Joel Quenneville	600th Coaching NHL Win	December 18, 2011
Jimmy Hayes	1st Career NHL Game	December 30, 2011
Jonathan Toews	1st Career NHL Penalty Shot Goal	December 30, 2011
Jimmy Hayes	1st Career NHL Goal; 1st Career NHL Point	January 2, 2012
Dylan Olsen	1st Career NHL Game	January 5, 2012
Andrew Shaw	1st Career NHL Game; 1st Career NHL Goal; 1st Career NHL Point	January 5, 2012
Sean O'Donnell	1,200th Career NHL Game	January 8, 2012
Viktor Stalberg	1st Career NHL Hat-Trick	January 11, 2012
Jimmy Hayes	1st Career NHL Assist	January 12, 2012
Andrew Shaw	1st Career NHL Assist	January 18, 2012
Corey Crawford	100th Career NHL Game	January 21, 2012
Nick Leddy	100th Career NHL Game	February 7, 2012
Dylan Olsen	1st Career NHL Assist; 1st Career NHL Point	February 18, 2012
Brandon Bollig	1st Career NHL Game	February 29, 2012
Ray Emery	200th Career NHL Game	March 2, 2012
Andrew Brunette	1,100th Career NHL Game	March 9, 2012
Marian Hossa	900th Career NHL Point	March 20, 2012
Michael Frolik	300th Career NHL Game	March 25, 2012

Playoffs
Player	Milestone	Reached
Andrew Shaw	1st Career NHL Playoff Game	April 12, 2012
Brandon Bollig	1st Career NHL Playoff Game	April 12, 2012
Brandon Bollig	1st Career NHL Playoff Goal; 1st Career NHL Playoff Point	April 14, 2012
Dylan Olsen	1st Career NHL Playoff Game	April 17, 2012
Brandon Saad	1st Career NHL Playoff Game	April 17, 2012
Brandon Saad	1st Career NHL Playoff Assist; 1st Career NHL Playoff Point	April 21, 2012

== Transactions ==
The Blackhawks have been involved in the following transactions during the 2011–12 season.

=== Trades ===
Date	Details
June 24, 2011	To Washington Capitals Troy Brouwer	To Chicago Blackhawks 1st-round pick in 2011
June 24, 2011	To Florida Panthers Brian Campbell	To Chicago Blackhawks Rostislav Olesz
June 27, 2011	To Florida Panthers Tomas Kopecky (Note: Trade of negotiating rights to.)	To Chicago Blackhawks Conditional 7th-round pick in 2012 (Note: Condition satisfied.)
June 29, 2011	To Buffalo Sabres Conditional 7th-round pick in 2012 (Note: Condition satisfied.)	To Chicago Blackhawks Steve Montador (Note: Trade of negotiating rights to.)
September 9, 2011	To New York Islanders Future considerations	To Chicago Blackhawks David Toews
December 2, 2011	To Ottawa Senators Rob Klinkhammer	To Chicago Blackhawks Conditional 7th-round pick in 2013 (Note: Condition satisfied.)
January 27, 2012	To Calgary Flames Brian Connelly	To Chicago Blackhawks Brendan Morrison
February 19, 2012	To Tampa Bay Lightning Brandon Segal	To Chicago Blackhawks Matt Fornataro
February 27, 2012	To Winnipeg Jets 2nd-round pick in 2013; 3rd-round pick in 2013	To Chicago Blackhawks Johnny Oduya
February 27, 2012	To New York Rangers John Scott	To Chicago Blackhawks 5th-round pick in 2012

=== Free agents acquired ===
Player	Former team	Contract terms
Jamal Mayers	San Jose Sharks	1 year, $550,000
Brett McLean	SC Bern	1 year, $525,000
Andrew Brunette	Minnesota Wild	1 year, $2 million
Sean O'Donnell	Philadelphia Flyers	1 year, $850,000
Daniel Carcillo	Philadelphia Flyers	1 year, $775,000
Sami Lepisto	Columbus Blue Jackets	1 year, $750,000
Brandon Segal	Dallas Stars	1 year, $525,000
Ray Emery	Anaheim Ducks	1 year, $600,000
Carter Hutton	Rockford IceHogs	1 year, $525,000
Terry Broadhurst	University of Nebraska Omaha	2 years, $1.235 million entry-level contract

=== Free agents lost ===
Player	New team	Contract terms
Jake Dowell	Dallas Stars	1 year, $800,000
Evan Brophey	Colorado Avalanche	1 year, $525,000
Jassen Cullimore	Iserlohn Roosters	1 year
Chris Campoli	Montreal Canadiens	1 year, $1.75 million

=== Claimed via waivers ===
Player	New team	Date claimed off waivers

=== Lost via waivers ===
Player	New team	Date claimed off waivers

=== Player signings ===
Player	Date	Contract terms
Corey Crawford	May 19, 2011	3 years, $8 million
Byron Froese	May 31, 2011	3 years, $1.77 million entry-level contract
David Gilbert	May 31, 2011	3 years, $1.71 million entry-level contract
Alexander Salak	May 31, 2011	2 years, $1.225 million
Steve Montador	June 30, 2011	4 years, $11 million
Viktor Stalberg	July 10, 2011	2 years, $1.75 million
Rob Klinkhammer	July 11, 2011	1 year, $525,000
Alec Richards	July 11, 2011	2 years, $1.05 million
Michael Frolik	July 15, 2011	3 years, $7 million
Patrick Sharp	August 3, 2011	5 years, $29.5 million contract extension
Brandon Saad	October 4, 2011	3 years, $2.385 million entry-level contract
Mark McNeill	January 2, 2012	3 years, $2.775 million entry-level contract
Phillip Danault	January 2, 2012	3 years, $2.775 million entry-level contract
Andrew Shaw	January 3, 2012	3 years, $1.695 million entry-level contract
Daniel Carcillo	March 12, 2012	2 years, $1.65 million contract extension
Ray Emery	April 7, 2012	1 year, $1.15 million contract extension
Peter LeBlanc	April 13, 2012	1 year, $525,000 entry-level contract
Rob Flick	May 15, 2012	3 years, $1.7475 million entry-level contract
Jamal Mayers	May 29, 2012	1 year, $600,000 contract extension
Johnny Oduya	May 29, 2012	3 years, $10.125 million contract extension
Mac Carruth	May 29, 2012	3 years, $1.8 million entry-level contract
Klas Dahlbeck	May 29, 2012	3 years, $1.73 million entry-level contract
Joakim Nordstrom	May 29, 2012	3 years, $1.8 million entry-level contract
Kent Simpson	May 29, 2012	3 years, $1.845 million entry-level contract
Adam Clendening	June 1, 2012	3 years, $2.2275 million entry-level contract

== Draft picks ==
Chicago's picks at the 2011 NHL entry draft in St. Paul, Minnesota.

Round	#	Player	Position	Nationality	College/Junior/Club team (League)
1	18	Mark McNeill	C	Canada	Prince Albert Raiders (WHL)
1	26 (from Washington)	Phillip Danault	LW	Canada	Victoriaville Tigres (QMJHL)
2	36 (from Winnipeg)	Adam Clendening	D	United States	Boston University (Hockey East)
2	43 (from Calgary via Toronto)	Brandon Saad	LW	United States	Saginaw Spirit (OHL)
3	70 (from Toronto)	Michael Paliotta	D	United States	U.S. National Team Development Program (USHL)
3	79	Klas Dahlbeck	D	Sweden	Linkopings HC (Elitserien)
4	109	Maxim Shalunov	RW	Russia	Traktor Chelyabinsk (KHL)
5	139	Andrew Shaw	C	Canada	Owen Sound Attack (OHL)
6	169	Sam Jardine	D	Canada	Camrose Kodiaks (AJHL)
7	199	Alex Broadhurst	C	United States	Green Bay Gamblers (USHL)
7	211 (from Boston)	Johan Mattsson	G	Sweden	Sodertalje SK Jr. (SWE-Jr.)

== See also ==
- 2011–12 NHL season
