= 2011–12 Detroit Red Wings season =

Season of play for professional ice hockey team

2011–12 Detroit Red Wings
- Division: 3rd Central
- Conference: 5th Western
- 2011–12 record: 48–28–6
- Home record: 31–7–3
- Road record: 17–21–3
- Goals for: 248
- Goals against: 203

Team information
- General manager: Ken Holland
- Coach: Mike Babcock
- Captain: Nicklas Lidstrom
- Alternate captains: Pavel Datsyuk; Niklas Kronwall; Henrik Zetterberg
- Arena: Joe Louis Arena
- Average attendance: 20,066 (100%); Total: 822,706

Team leaders
- Goals: Johan Franzen (28)
- Assists: Pavel Datsyuk (48)
- Points: Henrik Zetterberg (68)
- Penalty minutes: Kyle Quincey (89)
- Plus/minus: Todd Bertuzzi (+24)
- Wins: Jimmy Howard (35)
- Goals against average: Jimmy Howard (2.13)

The 2011–12 Detroit Red Wings season was the 86th season for the National Hockey League (NHL) franchise that was established on September 25, 1926. The Red Wings finished the season with a 48–28–6 record and for the first time since 1990–91 season, the Red Wings did not finish first or second in their division, finishing third. Also, the Red Wings had their earliest playoff exit since 2006 against the Edmonton Oilers, losing to the Nashville Predators in five games.

== Off-season ==
On July 19, 2011, goaltender Chris Osgood announced his retirement from the NHL after 17 seasons. Osgood won three Stanley Cups with the Red Wings and will remain with the Red Wings organization, working with Detroit's goaltending prospects.

== Regular season ==
On February 12, against the Philadelphia Flyers, the Red Wings tied an NHL record of 20 consecutive home wins. The only two other teams to accomplish this feat was the 1930 Boston Bruins and the 1976 Philadelphia Flyers. On February 14, against the Dallas Stars, the Red Wings broke the NHL record of 20 consecutive home wins, becoming the first team to record 21 straight home wins. The streak was extended to 23 on February 19 with a win over the San Jose Sharks. The streak started on November 5, 2011, against the Anaheim Ducks. However, the streak ended at 23 games with a 4–3 shootout loss to the Vancouver Canucks on February 23, 2012.

The Red Wings tied the Tampa Bay Lightning for the fewest shorthanded goals scored during the regular season with two.

== Standings ==
=== Divisional standings ===
Central Division
Pos	Team	GP	W	L	OTL	ROW	GF	GA	GD	Pts
1	y – St. Louis Blues	82	49	22	11	45	210	165	+45	109
2	x – Nashville Predators	82	48	26	8	43	237	210	+27	104
3	x – Detroit Red Wings	82	48	28	6	39	248	203	+45	102
4	x – Chicago Blackhawks	82	45	26	11	38	248	238	+10	101
5	Columbus Blue Jackets	82	29	46	7	25	202	262	−60	65

Source: National Hockey League
x – Clinched playoff spot; y – Clinched division

=== Conference standings ===
Western Conference
Pos	Div	Team	GP	W	L	OTL	ROW	GF	GA	GD	Pts
1	NW	p – Vancouver Canucks	82	51	22	9	43	249	198	+51	111
2	CE	y – St. Louis Blues	82	49	22	11	45	210	165	+45	109
3	PA	y – Phoenix Coyotes	82	42	27	13	36	216	204	+12	97
4	CE	x – Nashville Predators	82	48	26	8	43	237	210	+27	104
5	CE	x – Detroit Red Wings	82	48	28	6	39	248	203	+45	102
6	CE	x – Chicago Blackhawks	82	45	26	11	38	248	238	+10	101
7	PA	x – San Jose Sharks	82	43	29	10	34	228	210	+18	96
8	PA	x – Los Angeles Kings	82	40	27	15	34	194	179	+15	95
9	NW	Calgary Flames	82	37	29	16	34	202	226	−24	90
10	PA	Dallas Stars	82	42	35	5	35	211	222	−11	89
11	NW	Colorado Avalanche	82	41	35	6	32	208	220	−12	88
12	NW	Minnesota Wild	82	35	36	11	24	177	226	−49	81
13	PA	Anaheim Ducks	82	34	36	12	31	204	231	−27	80
14	NW	Edmonton Oilers	82	32	40	10	27	212	239	−27	74
15	CE	Columbus Blue Jackets	82	29	46	7	25	202	262	−60	65

Source: National Hockey League
p – Clinched Presidents' Trophy; x – Clinched playoff spot; y – Clinched division

== Schedule and results ==
=== Regular season ===
2011–12 game log

October: 5–4–0 (home: 3–1–0; road: 2–3–0)
#	Date	Opponent	Score	OT	Decision	Arena	Attendance	Record	Pts	Recap
1	October 7	Ottawa Senators	W 5–3		Howard	Joe Louis Arena	20,066	1–0–0	2	Recap
2	October 8	@ Colorado Avalanche	W 3–0		Conklin	Pepsi Center	18,007	2–0–0	4	Recap
3	October 13	Vancouver Canucks	W 2–0		Howard	Joe Louis Arena	20,066	3–0–0	6	Recap
4	October 15	@ Minnesota Wild	W 3–2	OT	Howard	Xcel Energy Center	17,104	4–0–0	8	Recap
5	October 21	Columbus Blue Jackets	W 5–2		Howard	Joe Louis Arena	20,066	5–0–0	10	Recap
6	October 22	@ Washington Capitals	L 1–7		Conklin	Verizon Center	18,506	5–1–0	10	Recap
7	October 25	@ Columbus Blue Jackets	L 1–4		Conklin	Nationwide Arena	15,100	5–2–0	10	Recap
8	October 28	San Jose Sharks	L 2–4		Howard	Joe Louis Arena	20,066	5–3–0	10	Recap
9	October 29	@ Minnesota Wild	L 0–1		Howard	Xcel Energy Center	17,233	5–4–0	10	Recap

November: 10–3–1 (home: 7–1–1; road: 3–2–0)
#	Date	Opponent	Score	OT	Decision	Arena	Attendance	Record	Pts	Recap
10	November 1	Minnesota Wild	L 1–2	OT	Howard	Joe Louis Arena	20,066	5–4–1	11	Recap
11	November 3	Calgary Flames	L 1–4		Howard	Joe Louis Arena	20,066	5–5–1	11	Recap
12	November 5	Anaheim Ducks	W 5–0		Howard	Joe Louis Arena	20,066	6–5–1	13	Recap
13	November 8	Colorado Avalanche	W 5–2		Howard	Joe Louis Arena	20,066	7–5–1	15	Recap
14	November 11	Edmonton Oilers	W 3–0		Howard	Joe Louis Arena	20,066	8–5–1	17	Recap
15	November 12	Dallas Stars	W 5–2		Howard	Joe Louis Arena	20,066	9–5–1	19	Recap
16	November 15	@ St. Louis Blues	L 1–2		Howard	Scottrade Center	19,150	9–6–1	19	Recap
17	November 17	@ San Jose Sharks	L 2–5		Howard	HP Pavilion at San Jose	17,562	9–7–1	19	Recap
18	November 19	@ Los Angeles Kings	W 4–1		Howard	Staples Center	18,118	10–7–1	21	Recap
19	November 20	@ Anaheim Ducks	W 4–2		Howard	Honda Center	17,229	11–7–1	23	Recap
20	November 23	Calgary Flames	W 5–3		Howard	Joe Louis Arena	20,066	12–7–1	25	Recap
21	November 25	@ Boston Bruins	W 3–2	SO	Howard	TD Garden	17,565	13–7–1	27	Recap
22	November 26	Nashville Predators	W 4–1		Howard	Joe Louis Arena	20,066	14–7–1	29	Recap
23	November 30	Tampa Bay Lightning	W 4–2		Howard	Joe Louis Arena	20,066	15–7–1	31	Recap

December: 9–6–0 (home: 5–0–0; road: 4–6–0)
#	Date	Opponent	Score	OT	Decision	Arena	Attendance	Record	Pts	Recap
24	December 2	@ Buffalo Sabres	W 4–1		Howard	First Niagara Center	18,690	16–7–1	33	Recap
25	December 4	@ Colorado Avalanche	L 2–4		Conklin	Pepsi Center	17,014	16–8–1	33	Recap
26	December 6	@ St. Louis Blues	L 2–3		Howard	Scottrade Center	19,150	16–9–1	33	Recap
27	December 8	Phoenix Coyotes	W 5–2		Howard	Joe Louis Arena	20,066	17–9–1	35	Recap
28	December 10	Winnipeg Jets	W 7–1		Howard	Joe Louis Arena	20,066	18–9–1	37	Recap
29	December 13	@ Pittsburgh Penguins	W 4–1		Howard	Consol Energy Center	18,592	19–9–1	39	Recap
30	December 15	@ Nashville Predators	L 3–4		Howard	Bridgestone Arena	17,113	19–10–1	39	Recap
31	December 17	Los Angeles Kings	W 8–2		Howard	Joe Louis Arena	20,066	20–10–1	41	Recap
32	December 19	@ Edmonton Oilers	W 3–2		Howard	Rexall Place	16,839	21–10–1	43	Recap
33	December 21	@ Vancouver Canucks	L 2–4		Howard	Rogers Arena	18,890	21–11–1	43	Recap
34	December 22	@ Calgary Flames	L 2–3		Conklin	Scotiabank Saddledome	19,289	21–12–1	43	Recap
35	December 26	@ Nashville Predators	W 4–1		Howard	Bridgestone Arena	17,113	22–12–1	45	Recap
36	December 27	St. Louis Blues	W 3–2		Howard	Joe Louis Arena	20,066	23–12–1	47	Recap
37	December 30	@ Chicago Blackhawks	L 2–3		Howard	United Center	22,166	23–13–1	47	Recap
38	December 31	St. Louis Blues	W 3–0		Howard	Joe Louis Arena	20,066	24–13–1	49	Recap

January: 10–3–0 (home: 5–0–0; road: 5–3–0)
#	Date	Opponent	Score	OT	Decision	Arena	Attendance	Record	Pts	Recap
39	January 3	@ Dallas Stars	W 5–4		Howard	American Airlines Center	15,182	25–13–1	51	Recap
40	January 7	@ Toronto Maple Leafs	L 3–4		Howard	Air Canada Centre	19,536	25–14–1	51	Recap
41	January 8	@ Chicago Blackhawks	W 3–2	OT	Conklin	United Center	21,858	26–14–1	53	Recap
42	January 10	@ New York Islanders	L 1–5		Conklin	Nassau Veterans Memorial Coliseum	12,864	26–15–1	53	Recap
43	January 12	Phoenix Coyotes	W 3–2	SO	Howard	Joe Louis Arena	20,066	27–15–1	55	Recap
44	January 14	Chicago Blackhawks	W 3–2	OT	Howard	Joe Louis Arena	20,066	28–15–1	57	Recap
45	January 16	Buffalo Sabres	W 5–0		Howard	Joe Louis Arena	20,066	29–15–1	59	Recap
46	January 17	@ Dallas Stars	W 3–2	SO	Conklin	American Airlines Center	15,148	30–15–1	61	Recap
47	January 19	@ Phoenix Coyotes	W 3–2	SO	Howard	Jobing.com Arena	15,067	31–15–1	63	Recap
48	January 21	Columbus Blue Jackets	W 3–2	SO	Howard	Joe Louis Arena	20,066	32–15–1	65	Recap
49	January 23	St. Louis Blues	W 3–1		Howard	Joe Louis Arena	20,066	33–15–1	67	Recap
50	January 25	@ Montreal Canadiens	L 2–7		Howard	Bell Centre	21,273	33–16–1	67	Recap
51	January 31	@ Calgary Flames	W 3–1		Howard	Scotiabank Saddledome	19,289	34–16–1	69	Recap

February: 8–3–2 (home: 6–1–1; road: 2–2–1)
#	Date	Opponent	Score	OT	Decision	Arena	Attendance	Record	Pts	Recap
52	February 2	@ Vancouver Canucks	W 4–3	SO	Howard	Rogers Arena	18,890	35–16–1	71	Recap
53	February 4	@ Edmonton Oilers	L 4–5	SO	MacDonald	Rexall Place	16,839	35–16–2	72	Recap
54	February 6	@ Phoenix Coyotes	L 1–3		MacDonald	Jobing.com Arena	12,687	35–17–2	72	Recap
55	February 8	Edmonton Oilers	W 4–2		MacDonald	Joe Louis Arena	20,066	36–17–2	74	Recap
56	February 10	Anaheim Ducks	W 2–1	SO	MacDonald	Joe Louis Arena	20,066	37–17–2	76	Recap
57	February 12	Philadelphia Flyers	W 4–3		MacDonald	Joe Louis Arena	20,066	38–17–2	78	Recap
58	February 14	Dallas Stars	W 3–1		MacDonald	Joe Louis Arena	20,066	39–17–2	80	Recap
59	February 17	Nashville Predators	W 2–1		MacDonald	Joe Louis Arena	20,066	40–17–2	82	Recap
60	February 19	San Jose Sharks	W 3–2		MacDonald	Joe Louis Arena	20,066	41–17–2	84	Recap
61	February 21	@ Chicago Blackhawks	L 1–2		Howard	United Center	22,027	41–18–2	84	Recap
62	February 23	Vancouver Canucks	L 3–4	SO	Howard	Joe Louis Arena	20,066	41–18–3	85	Recap
63	February 25	Colorado Avalanche	L 3–4		Howard	Joe Louis Arena	20,066	41–19–3	85	Recap
64	February 28	@ Columbus Blue Jackets	W 5–2		MacDonald	Nationwide Arena	14,333	42–19–3	87	Recap

March: 4–8–2 (home: 4–3–0; road: 0–5–2)
#	Date	Opponent	Score	OT	Decision	Arena	Attendance	Record	Pts	Recap
65	March 2	Minnesota Wild	W 6–0		Howard	Joe Louis Arena	20,066	43–19–3	89	Recap
66	March 4	Chicago Blackhawks	L 1–2		MacDonald	Joe Louis Arena	20,066	43–20–3	89	Recap
67	March 6	@ Philadelphia Flyers	L 2–3		MacDonald	Wells Fargo Center	19,892	43–21–3	89	Recap
68	March 9	Los Angeles Kings	W 4–3		MacDonald	Joe Louis Arena	20,066	44–21–3	91	Recap
69	March 10	@ Nashville Predators	L 2–3		MacDonald	Bridgestone Arena	17,113	44–22–3	91	Recap
70	March 13	@ Los Angeles Kings	L 2–5		Howard	Staples Center	18,118	44–23–3	91	Recap
71	March 14	@ Anaheim Ducks	L 0–4		MacDonald	Honda Center	16,331	44–24–3	91	Recap
72	March 17	@ San Jose Sharks	L 2–3	OT	Howard	HP Pavilion at San Jose	17,562	44–24–4	92	Recap
73	March 19	Washington Capitals	L 3–5		Howard	Joe Louis Arena	20,066	44–25–4	92	Recap
74	March 21	@ New York Rangers	L 1–2	OT	Conklin	Madison Square Garden	18,200	44–25–5	93	Recap
75	March 24	Carolina Hurricanes	W 5–4		Conklin	Joe Louis Arena	20,066	45–25–5	95	Recap
76	March 26	Columbus Blue Jackets	W 7–2		Conklin	Joe Louis Arena	20,066	46–25–5	97	Recap
77	March 28	@ Columbus Blue Jackets	L 2–4		Conklin	Nationwide Arena	12,432	46–26–5	97	Recap
78	March 30	Nashville Predators	L 1–4		Howard	Joe Louis Arena	20,066	46–27–5	97	Recap

April: 2–1–1 (home: 1–1–1; road: 1–0–0)
#	Date	Opponent	Score	OT	Decision	Arena	Attendance	Record	Pts	Recap
79	April 1	Florida Panthers	W 2–1	SO	Howard	Joe Louis Arena	20,066	47–27–5	99	Recap
80	April 4	@ St. Louis Blues	W 3–2	SO	Howard	Scottrade Center	18,755	48–27–5	101	Recap
81	April 5	New Jersey Devils	L 1–2		Howard	Joe Louis Arena	20,066	48–28–5	101	Recap
82	April 7	Chicago Blackhawks	L 2–3	SO	Howard	Joe Louis Arena	20,066	48–28–6	102	Recap

Legend: Win (2 points) Loss (0 points) Overtime/shootout loss (1 point)

=== Playoffs ===
2012 Stanley Cup playoffs

Western Conference Quarter-final vs. (4) Nashville Predators: Nashville won series 4–1
Game	Date	Opponent	Score	OT	Decision	Arena	Attendance	Series	Recap
1	April 11	@ Nashville Predators	L 2–3		Howard	Bridgestone Arena	17,113	0–1	Recap
2	April 13	@ Nashville Predators	W 3–2		Howard	Bridgestone Arena	17,113	1–1	Recap
3	April 15	Nashville Predators	L 2–3		Howard	Joe Louis Arena	20,066	1–2	Recap
4	April 17	Nashville Predators	L 1–3		Howard	Joe Louis Arena	20,066	1–3	Recap
5	April 20	@ Nashville Predators	L 1–2		Howard	Bridgestone Arena	17,113	1–4	Recap

Legend: Win Loss

== Player statistics ==
=== Skaters ===
Note: GP = Games played; G = Goals; A = Assists; Pts = Points; +/− = Plus/minus; PIM = Penalty minutes

Regular season

Player	GP	G	A	Pts	+/−	PIM
Henrik Zetterberg	82	22	47	69	14	47
Pavel Datsyuk	70	19	48	67	21	14
Valtteri Filppula	81	23	43	66	18	14
Johan Franzen	77	29	27	56	23	40
Jiri Hudler	81	25	25	50	10	42
Todd Bertuzzi	71	14	24	38	23	64
Niklas Kronwall	82	15	21	36	−2	38
Nicklas Lidstrom	70	11	23	34	21	28
Danny Cleary	75	12	21	33	2	30
Ian White	77	7	25	32	23	22
Darren Helm	68	9	17	26	5	12
Drew Miller	80	14	11	25	6	20
Tomas Holmstrom	74	11	13	24	−9	40
Justin Abdelkader	81	8	14	22	4	62
Brad Stuart	81	6	15	21	16	29
Jakub Kindl	55	1	12	13	7	25
Jonathan Ericsson	69	1	10	11	16	47
Cory Emmerton	71	6	4	10	1	14
Brendan Smith	14	1	6	7	3	13
Gustav Nyquist	18	1	6	7	2	2
Kyle Quincey^{†}	18	2	1	3	0	29
Chris Conner	8	1	2	3	2	0
Jan Mursak	25	1	2	3	2	0
Mike Commodore^{‡}	17	0	2	2	3	21
Doug Janik	9	0	1	1	2	6
Patrick Eaves	10	0	1	1	0	2
Fabian Brunnstrom	5	0	1	1	−2	4
Joakim Andersson	5	0	0	0	1	0
Riley Sheahan	1	0	0	0	0	4

Playoffs

Player	GP	G	A	Pts	+/−	PIM
Pavel Datsyuk	5	1	2	3	0	2
Henrik Zetterberg	5	2	1	3	−3	4
Tomas Holmstrom	5	1	1	2	0	2
Niklas Kronwall	5	0	2	2	−2	4
Valtteri Filppula	5	0	2	2	−3	2
Jiri Hudler	5	2	0	2	−3	4
Kyle Quincey	5	0	2	2	−2	6
Brad Stuart	5	0	1	1	−5	0
Ian White	5	1	0	1	−2	0
Drew Miller	5	0	1	1	0	2
Johan Franzen	5	1	0	1	−1	8
Cory Emmerton	5	1	0	1	1	2
Nicklas Lidstrom	5	0	0	0	0	0
Todd Bertuzzi	5	0	0	0	−5	9
Danny Cleary	5	0	0	0	−1	2
Jonathan Ericsson	5	0	0	0	−1	6
Justin Abdelkader	5	0	0	0	−5	2
Darren Helm	1	0	0	0	0	0
Gustav Nyquist	4	0	0	0	1	0

=== Goaltenders ===
Note: GP = Games played; TOI = Time on ice (minutes); W = Wins; L = Losses; OT = Overtime losses; GA = Goals against; SO = Shutouts; Sv% = Save percentage; GAA = Goals against average

Regular season

Player	GP	TOI	W	L	OT	GA	GAA	SA	Sv%	SO	G	A	PIM
Jimmy Howard	57	3360	35	17	4	119	2.13	1496	.920	6	0	1	6
Joey MacDonald	14	806	8	5	1	29	2.16	330	.912	0	0	0	0
Ty Conklin	15	805	5	6	1	44	3.28	378	.884	1	0	1	0

Playoffs

Player	GP	TOI	W	L	GA	GAA	SA	Sv%	SO	G	A	PIM
Jimmy Howard	5	295	1	4	13	2.64	116	.888	0	0	0	0

^{†}Denotes player spent time with another team before joining Red Wings. Stats reflect time with the Red Wings only.
^{‡}Traded mid-season
Bold/italics denotes franchise record

== Awards and records ==
=== Awards ===
Regular season
Player	Award	Awarded
Jimmy Howard	NHL Second Star of the Week	November 14, 2011
Niklas Kronwall	NHL Second Star of the Week	March 5, 2012

=== Milestones ===
The Detroit Red Wings officially broke the NHL record for consecutive home games won, on February 14, 2012. They defeated the Dallas Stars by a score of 3–1, breaking the 1929–30 Boston Bruins and the 1975–76 Philadelphia Flyers previous record of 20 games. The streak ended at 23 wins after a shootout loss to the Vancouver Canucks on February 23, 2012.

Regular season
Player	Milestone	Reached
Cory Emmerton	1st career NHL assist	October 7, 2011
Johan Franzen	100th career NHL assist	October 15, 2011
Johan Franzen	400th career NHL game	October 21, 2011
Brad Stuart	800th career NHL game	October 21, 2011
Fabian Brunnstrom	100th career NHL game	October 22, 2011
Nicklas Lidstrom	1,500th career NHL game	October 22, 2011
Gustav Nyquist	1st career NHL game	November 1, 2011
Henrik Zetterberg	600th career NHL game	November 11, 2011
Niklas Kronwall	400th career NHL game	November 12, 2011
Brendan Smith	1st career NHL game	November 17, 2011
Brendan Smith	1st career NHL assist 1st career NHL point	November 19, 2011
Darren Helm	200th career NHL game	November 23, 2011
Joakim Andersson	1st career NHL game	December 27, 2011
Jonathan Ericsson	200th career NHL game	December 30, 2011
Pavel Datsyuk	700th career NHL game	December 31, 2011
Gustav Nyquist	1st career NHL assist 1st career NHL point	January 3, 2012
Valtteri Filppula	200th career NHL point	January 3, 2012
Niklas Kronwall	200th career NHL point	January 7, 2012
Valtteri Filppula	400th career NHL game	January 7, 2012
Daniel Cleary	200th career NHL assist	January 12, 2012
Jimmy Howard	100th career NHL win	January 12, 2012
Pavel Datsyuk	700th career NHL point	January 16, 2012
Jan Mursak	1st career NHL assist	January 17, 2012
Todd Bertuzzi	300th career NHL goal	February 4, 2012
Danny Cleary	800th career NHL game	February 6, 2012
Tomas Holmstrom	1,000th career NHL game	February 10, 2012
Henrik Zetterberg	600th career NHL point	February 17, 2012
Jiri Hudler	200th career NHL point	February 21, 2012
Jakub Kindl	100th career NHL game	March 2, 2012
Brendan Smith	1st career NHL goal	March 2, 2012
Brad Stuart	300th career NHL point	March 4, 2012
Joey MacDonald	100th career NHL game	March 10, 2012
Justin Abdelkader	200th career NHL game	March 19, 2012
Jiri Hudler	400th career NHL game	March 19, 2012
Gustav Nyquist	1st career NHL goal	March 26, 2012
Riley Sheahan	1st career NHL game	April 7, 2012

Playoffs
Player	Milestone	Reached
Henrik Zetterberg	50th career NHL playoff goal 100th career NHL playoff point	April 11, 2012

== Transactions ==
The Red Wings have been involved in the following transactions during the 2011–12 season.

=== Trades ===
Date	Details
June 24, 2011	To Ottawa Senators 1st-round pick in 2011	To Detroit Red Wings 2nd-round pick in 2011; 2nd-round pick in 2011
February 19, 2012	To Tampa Bay Lightning Sebastien Piche; 1st-round pick in 2012	To Detroit Red Wings Kyle Quincey
February 27, 2012	To Tampa Bay Lightning Mike Commodore	To Detroit Red Wings Conditional 7th-round pick in 2013 (Note: Condition not satisfied.)

=== Free agents signed ===
Player	Former team	Contract terms
Mike Commodore	Columbus Blue Jackets	1 year, $1 million
Ian White	San Jose Sharks	2 years, $5.75 million
Garnet Exelby	Rockford IceHogs	1 year, $600,000
Chris Conner	Pittsburgh Penguins	1 year, $550,000
Ty Conklin	St. Louis Blues	1 year, $750,000
Fabian Brunnstrom	Toronto Marlies	1 year, $600,000

=== Free agents lost ===
Player	New team	Contract terms
Derek Meech	Winnipeg Jets	1 year, $700,000
Jamie Tardif	Boston Bruins	2 years, $1.2 million
Mike Modano	Dallas Stars	1 day, $999,999

=== Claimed via waivers ===
Player	Former team	Date claimed off waivers

=== Lost via waivers ===
Player	New team	Date claimed off waivers

=== Lost via retirement ===
Player
Brian Rafalski
Chris Osgood
Kris Draper

=== Lost via death ===
Player	Cause
Ruslan Salei	plane crash

=== Player signings ===
Player	Date	Contract terms
Adam Almqvist	May 27, 2011	3 years, $1.775 million entry-level contract
Andrej Nestrasil	May 31, 2011	3 years, $1.755 million entry-level contract
Nicklas Lidstrom	June 20, 2011	1 year, $6.2 million
Jonathan Ericsson	July 1, 2011	3 years, $9.75 million
Patrick Eaves	July 1, 2011	3 years, $3.6 million
Drew Miller	July 1, 2011	2 years, $1.65 million
Logan Pyett	July 5, 2011	1 year, $525,000
Joey MacDonald	July 11, 2011	2 years, $1.1 million
Jordan Pearce	July 21, 2011	2 years, $1.05 million
Francis Pare	July 27, 2011	2 years, $1.115 million
Petr Mrazek	October 19, 2011	3 years, $1.815 million entry-level contract
Niklas Kronwall	October 31, 2011	7 years, $33.25 million contract extension
Todd Bertuzzi	February 23, 2012	2 years, $4.15 million contract extension
Xavier Ouellet	March 25, 2012	3 years, $2.1025 million entry-level contract
Ryan Sproul	March 25, 2012	3 years, $2.2275 million entry-level contract
Riley Sheahan	April 5, 2012	3 years, $2.355 million entry-level contract
Teemu Pulkkinen	May 29, 2012	3 years, $2.095 million entry-level contract
Calle Jarnkrok	May 30, 2012	3 years, $2.145 million entry-level contract

== Draft picks ==
Round	Overall pick	Player	Position	Nationality	College/junior/club team (league)
2	35 (from Ottawa)	Tomas Jurco	RW	Slovakia	Saint John Sea Dogs (QMJHL)
2	48 (from Chicago via Ottawa)	Xavier Ouellet	D	France	Montreal Junior Hockey Club (QMJHL)
2	55	Ryan Sproul	D	Canada	Sault Ste. Marie Greyhounds (OHL)
3	85	Alan Quine	C	Canada	Peterborough Petes (OHL)
4	115	Marek Tvrdon	RW	Slovakia	Vancouver Giants (WHL)
5	145	Philippe Hudon	C / RW	Canada	Choate Rosemary Hall (USHS-CT)
5	146 (from Philadelphia)	Mattias Backman	D	Sweden	Linkopings HC (Elitserien)
6	175	Richard Nedomlel	D	Czech Republic	Swift Current Broncos (WHL)
7	205	Alexey Marchenko	D	Russia	CSKA Moscow (KHL)

== See also ==
- 2011–12 NHL season
