= 2011–12 Minnesota Wild season =

National Hockey League team season

2011–12 Minnesota Wild
- Division: 4th Northwest
- Conference: 12th Western
- 2011–12 record: 35–36–11
- Home record: 20–17–4
- Road record: 15–19–7

Team information
- General manager: Chuck Fletcher
- Coach: Mike Yeo
- Captain: Mikko Koivu
- Alternate captains: Matt Cullen; Dany Heatley; Nick Schultz (Oct.–Feb.)
- Arena: Xcel Energy Center
- Average attendance: 17,772 (98.4%)

The 2011–12 Minnesota Wild season was the 12th season for the National Hockey League (NHL) franchise that was established on June 25, 1997.

The Wild failed to qualify for the Stanley Cup playoffs for the fourth consecutive season.

This currently remains the last season the Wild finished with a losing record.

== Off-season ==
On June 17, 2011, the Wild officially introduced Mike Yeo as their new head coach. Yeo had been the head coach of the Wild's American Hockey League (AHL) affiliate, the Houston Aeros.

== Regular season ==
Excluding 11 shootout-winning goals, the Wild scored 166 goals overall, the fewest in the NHL.

== Playoffs ==
The Wild failed to qualify for the playoffs for the fourth consecutive year.

== Standings ==
Northwest Division
Pos	Team	GP	W	L	OTL	ROW	GF	GA	GD	Pts
1	p – Vancouver Canucks	82	51	22	9	43	249	198	+51	111
2	Calgary Flames	82	37	29	16	34	202	226	−24	90
3	Colorado Avalanche	82	41	35	6	32	208	220	−12	88
4	Minnesota Wild	82	35	36	11	24	177	226	−49	81
5	Edmonton Oilers	82	32	40	10	27	212	239	−27	74

Source: National Hockey League
p – Clinched Presidents' Trophy

Western Conference
Pos	Div	Team	GP	W	L	OTL	ROW	GF	GA	GD	Pts
1	NW	p – Vancouver Canucks	82	51	22	9	43	249	198	+51	111
2	CE	y – St. Louis Blues	82	49	22	11	45	210	165	+45	109
3	PA	y – Phoenix Coyotes	82	42	27	13	36	216	204	+12	97
4	CE	x – Nashville Predators	82	48	26	8	43	237	210	+27	104
5	CE	x – Detroit Red Wings	82	48	28	6	39	248	203	+45	102
6	CE	x – Chicago Blackhawks	82	45	26	11	38	248	238	+10	101
7	PA	x – San Jose Sharks	82	43	29	10	34	228	210	+18	96
8	PA	x – Los Angeles Kings	82	40	27	15	34	194	179	+15	95
9	NW	Calgary Flames	82	37	29	16	34	202	226	−24	90
10	PA	Dallas Stars	82	42	35	5	35	211	222	−11	89
11	NW	Colorado Avalanche	82	41	35	6	32	208	220	−12	88
12	NW	Minnesota Wild	82	35	36	11	24	177	226	−49	81
13	PA	Anaheim Ducks	82	34	36	12	31	204	231	−27	80
14	NW	Edmonton Oilers	82	32	40	10	27	212	239	−27	74
15	CE	Columbus Blue Jackets	82	29	46	7	25	202	262	−60	65

Source: National Hockey League
p – Clinched Presidents' Trophy; x – Clinched playoff spot; y – Clinched division

== Schedule and results ==
=== Pre-season ===
2011 Pre-season Game Log: 3–3–1 (Home: 1–1–1; Road: 2–2–0)
#	Date	Visitor	Score	Home	OT	Decision	Attendance	Record	Recap
1	September 20	Minnesota Wild	4–3	Edmonton Oilers		Hackett	15,653	1–0–0
2	September 22	Minnesota Wild	1–0	St. Louis Blues		Backstrom	9,644	2–0–0
3	September 23	Columbus Blue Jackets	3–4	Minnesota Wild	OT	Harding	14,119	3–0–0
4	September 24	Minnesota Wild	1–4	Pittsburgh Penguins		Backstrom	18,387	3–1–0
5	September 27	St. Louis Blues	4–3	Minnesota Wild		Backstrom	13,789	3–2–0
6	September 29	Minnesota Wild	2–4	Columbus Blue Jackets		Harding	11,709	3–3–0
7	September 30	Edmonton Oilers	4–3	Minnesota Wild	SO	Backstrom	14,544	3–3–1

=== Regular season ===
2011–12 Game Log

October: 4–3–3 (Home: 3–2–1; Road: 1–1–2)
#	Date	Visitor	Score	Home	OT	Decision	Attendance	Record	Pts	Recap
1	October 8	Columbus Blue Jackets	2–4	Minnesota Wild		Backstrom	19,040	1–0–0	2
2	October 10	Minnesota Wild	1–2	New York Islanders		Backstrom	11,278	1–1–0	2
3	October 11	Minnesota Wild	3–4	Ottawa Senators	SO	Backstrom	19,455	1–1–1	3
4	October 13	Edmonton Oilers	1–2	Minnesota Wild	SO	Backstrom	15,878	2–1–1	5
5	October 15	Minnesota Wild	2–1	Detroit Red Wings	OT	Harding	17,104	3–1–1	7
6	October 18	Pittsburgh Penguins	4–2	Minnesota Wild		Backstrom	17,297	2–2–2	6
7	October 20	Minnesota Wild	2–1	Edmonton Oilers	SO	Backstrom	16,839	3–2–2	8
8	October 22	Minnesota Wild	2–3	Vancouver Canucks	OT	Backstrom	18,860	3–2–3	9
9	October 27	Anaheim Ducks	3–2	Minnesota Wild		Backstrom	15,723	3–3–3	9
10	October 29	Detroit Red Wings	0–1	Minnesota Wild		Harding	17,233	4–3–3	11

November: 11–4–0 (Home: 6–2–0; Road: 5–2–0)
#	Date	Visitor	Score	Home	OT	Decision	Attendance	Record	Pts	Recap
11	November 1	Minnesota Wild	2–1	Detroit Red Wings	OT	Harding	20,066	5–3–3	13
12	November 3	Vancouver Canucks	1–5	Minnesota Wild		Harding	16,534	6–3–3	15
13	November 5	St. Louis Blues	1–2	Minnesota Wild		Harding	16,917	7–3–3	17
14	November 8	Minnesota Wild	3–0	Calgary Flames		Backstrom	19,289	8–3–3	19
15	November 10	Minnesota Wild	1–3	San Jose Sharks		Backstrom	17,562	8–4–3	19
16	November 12	Minnesota Wild	2–5	Los Angeles Kings		Harding	18,118	8–5–3	19
17	November 13	Minnesota Wild	3–2	Anaheim Ducks		Backstrom	13,803	9–5–3	21
18	November 15	Minnesota Wild	4–2	Columbus Blue Jackets		Backstrom	10,833	10–5–3	23
19	November 17	Colorado Avalanche	0–1	Minnesota Wild		Backstrom	16,779	11–5–3	25
20	November 19	St. Louis Blues	2–3	Minnesota Wild	SO	Harding	17,259	12–5–3	27
21	November 23	Nashville Predators	2–3	Minnesota Wild		Harding	16,981	13–5–3	29
22	November 25	Edmonton Oilers	5–2	Minnesota Wild		Harding	18,092	13–6–3	29
23	November 27	Calgary Flames	5–2	Minnesota Wild		Backstrom	16,864	13–7–3	29
24	November 28	Tampa Bay Lightning	1–3	Minnesota Wild		Backstrom	16,628	14–7–3	31
25	November 30	Minnesota Wild	3–2	Edmonton Oilers	SO	Backstrom	16,839	15–7–3	33

December: 6–6–3 (Home: 2–2–2; Road: 4–4–1)
#	Date	Visitor	Score	Home	OT	Decision	Attendance	Record	Pts	Recap
26	December 2	New Jersey Devils	2–4	Minnesota Wild		Backstrom	17,310	16–7–3	35
27	December 4	Minnesota Wild	5–3	Anaheim Ducks		Harding	14,002	17–7–3	37
28	December 6	Minnesota Wild	2–1	San Jose Sharks		Hackett	17,562	18–7–3	39
29	December 8	Minnesota Wild	4–2	Los Angeles Kings		Hackett	18,118	19–7–3	41
30	December 10	Minnesota Wild	4–1	Phoenix Coyotes		Backstrom	10,976	20–7–3	43
31	December 13	Minnesota Wild	1–2	Winnipeg Jets		Backstrom	15,004	20–8–3	43
32	December 14	Chicago Blackhawks	4–3	Minnesota Wild	SO	Backstrom	19,254	20–8–4	44
33	December 17	New York Islanders	2–1	Minnesota Wild	SO	Backstrom	18,209	20–8–5	45
34	December 19	Minnesota Wild	0–4	Vancouver Canucks		Backstrom	18,890	20–9–5	45
35	December 20	Minnesota Wild	1–2	Calgary Flames		Harding	19,289	20–10–5	45
36	December 22	Minnesota Wild	1–4	Edmonton Oilers		Backstrom	16,839	20–11–5	45
37	December 26	Colorado Avalanche	4–2	Minnesota Wild		Backstrom	19,290	20–12–5	45
38	December 28	Minnesota Wild	1–2	Nashville Predators	SO	Harding	17,113	20–12–6	46
39	December 29	Edmonton Oilers	3–4	Minnesota Wild		Backstrom	19,194	21–12–6	48
40	December 31	Phoenix Coyotes	4–2	Minnesota Wild		Backstrom	19,297	21–13–6	48

January: 3–6–1 (Home: 2–1–0; Road: 1–5–1)
#	Date	Visitor	Score	Home	OT	Decision	Attendance	Record	Pts	Recap
41	January 4	Minnesota Wild	0–3	Vancouver Canucks		Harding	18,890	21–14–6	48
42	January 7	Minnesota Wild	1–3	Calgary Flames		Backstrom	19,289	21–15–6	48
43	January 10	San Jose Sharks	4–5	Minnesota Wild	SO	Harding	18,986	22–15–6	50
44	January 12	Minnesota Wild	2–5	Chicago Blackhawks		Harding	21,490	22–16–6	50
45	January 14	Minnesota Wild	2–3	St. Louis Blues	SO	Harding	19,150	22–16–7	51
46	January 17	Minnesota Wild	1–5	Philadelphia Flyers		Harding	19,787	22–17–7	51
47	January 19	Minnesota Wild	1–4	Toronto Maple Leafs		Backstrom	19,421	22–18–7	51
48	January 21	Dallas Stars	2–5	Minnesota Wild		Harding	19,213	23–18–7	53
49	January 24	Minnesota Wild	3–2	Colorado Avalanche		Backstrom	16,291	24–18–7	55
50	January 31	Nashville Predators	5–4	Minnesota Wild		Harding	17,325	24–19–7	55

February: 4–7–2 (Home: 2–4–1; Road: 2–3–1)
#	Date	Visitor	Score	Home	OT	Decision	Attendance	Record	Pts	Recap
51	February 2	Minnesota Wild	1–0	Colorado Avalanche		Backstrom	14,186	25–19–7	57
52	February 4	Minnesota Wild	1–2	Dallas Stars	SO	Backstrom	18,532	25–19–8	58
53	February 7	Minnesota Wild	1–3	Columbus Blue Jackets		Backstrom	11,237	25–20–8	58
54	February 9	Vancouver Canucks	5–2	Minnesota Wild		Backstrom	17,859	25–21–8	58
55	February 11	Columbus Blue Jackets	3–1	Minnesota Wild		Backstrom	18,958	25–22–8	58
56	February 14	Anaheim Ducks	2–1	Minnesota Wild		Harding	17,552	25–23–8	58
57	February 16	Winnipeg Jets	4–3	Minnesota Wild	SO	Backstrom	19,060	25–23–9	59
58	February 18	Minnesota Wild	0–4	St. Louis Blues		Harding	19,150	25–24–9	59
59	February 19	Boston Bruins	0–2	Minnesota Wild		Backstrom	19,198	26–24–9	61
60	February 23	Minnesota Wild	3–2	Florida Panthers	SO	Backstrom	13,892	27–24–9	63
61	February 24	Minnesota Wild	1–4	Dallas Stars		Backstrom	13,144	27–25–9	63
62	February 26	San Jose Sharks	3–4	Minnesota Wild		Backstrom	17,401	28–25–9	65
63	February 28	Los Angeles Kings	4–0	Minnesota Wild		Backstrom	17,317	28–26–9	65

March: 5–9–1 (Home: 4–5–0; Road: 1–4–1)
#	Date	Visitor	Score	Home	OT	Decision	Attendance	Record	Pts	Recap
64	March 1	Minnesota Wild	4–5	Montreal Canadiens	SO	Harding	21,273	28–26–10	66
65	March 2	Minnesota Wild	0–6	Detroit Red Wings		Harding	20,066	28–27–10	66
66	March 4	Colorado Avalanche	2–0	Minnesota Wild		Hackett	17,354	28–28–10	66
67	March 6	Minnesota Wild	1–7	Colorado Avalanche		Hackett	13,385	28–29–10	66
68	March 8	Minnesota Wild	3–2	Phoenix Coyotes	SO	Hackett	11,716	29–29–10	68
69	March 11	Calgary Flames	4–3	Minnesota Wild		Hackett	17,119	29–30–10	68
70	March 13	Dallas Stars	1–0	Minnesota Wild		Hackett	17,326	29–31–10	68
71	March 17	Carolina Hurricanes	5–3	Minnesota Wild		Hackett	18,394	29–32–10	68
72	March 19	Vancouver Canucks	0–2	Minnesota Wild		Harding	17,188	30–32–10	70
73	March 22	Calgary Flames	2–3	Minnesota Wild	SO	Harding	17,002	31–32–10	72
74	March 24	Minnesota Wild	1–3	Buffalo Sabres		Harding	18,690	31–33–10	72
75	March 25	Minnesota Wild	0–3	Washington Capitals		Hackett	18,506	31–34–10	72
76	March 27	New York Rangers	3–2	Minnesota Wild		Harding	17,880	31–35–10	72
77	March 29	Florida Panthers	2–3	Minnesota Wild	OT	Backstrom	16,952	32–35–10	74
78	March 31	Los Angeles Kings	3–4	Minnesota Wild	SO	Backstrom	18,209	33–35–10	76

April: 2–1–1 (Home: 1–1–0; Road: 1–0–1)
#	Date	Visitor	Score	Home	OT	Decision	Attendance	Record	Pts	Recap
79	April 1	Minnesota Wild	5–4	Chicago Blackhawks	SO	Harding	21,576	34–35–10	78
80	April 3	Minnesota Wild	1–2	Nashville Predators	SO	Backstrom	17,113	34–35–11	79
81	April 5	Chicago Blackhawks	1–2	Minnesota Wild	SO	Harding	18,643	35–35–11	81
82	April 7	Phoenix Coyotes	4–1	Minnesota Wild		Backstrom	18,864	35–36–11	81

Legend: Win (2 points) Loss (0 points) Overtime/shootout loss (1 point)

== Player statistics ==
=== Skaters ===
Note: GP = Games played; G = Goals; A = Assists; Pts = Points; +/− = Plus/minus; PIM = Penalty minutes

Regular season

Player	GP	G	A	Pts	+/−	PIM
Dany Heatley	82	24	29	53	2	28
Mikko Koivu	55	12	32	44	10	28
Kyle Brodziak	82	22	22	44	−15	66
Devin Setoguchi	69	19	17	36	−17	28
Matt Cullen	73	14	21	35	−10	24
Cal Clutterbuck	74	15	12	27	−4	103
Nick Johnson	77	8	18	26	−6	45
Jared Spurgeon	70	3	20	23	−4	6
Pierre-Marc Bouchard	37	9	13	22	−1	18
Darroll Powe	82	6	7	13	−20	57
Marek Zidlicky^{‡}	40	0	13	13	−7	22
Marco Scandella	63	3	9	12	−22	19
Nate Prosser	51	1	11	12	−17	57
Guillaume Latendresse	16	5	4	9	6	20
Justin Falk	47	1	8	9	−13	54
Erik Christensen^{†}	29	6	1	7	−13	6
Casey Wellman^{‡}	14	2	5	7	−4	0
Greg Zanon^{‡}	39	2	4	6	−1	14
Warren Peters	58	1	4	5	−15	54
Tom Gilbert^{†}	20	0	5	5	−5	8
Clayton Stoner	51	1	4	5	3	62
Carson McMillan	11	1	2	3	1	11
Brett Bulmer	9	0	3	3	1	6
Steven Kampfer^{†}	13	2	1	3	−7	2
Nick Schultz^{‡}	62	1	2	3	−10	30
Mike Lundin	17	0	2	2	−1	4
Jeff Taffe	5	0	2	2	2	0
Chad Rau	9	2	0	2	-1	0
David McIntyre	7	1	1	2	−1	2
Stephane Veilleux^{†}	21	0	2	2	−2	15
Jed Ortmeyer	35	1	1	2	−8	14
Matt Kassian	24	2	0	2	−2	55
Jason Zucker	6	0	2	2	−2	2
Colton Gillies^{‡}	37	0	2	2	−5	10
Cody Almond	10	1	0	1	−5	15
Jarod Palmer	6	1	0	1	−2	4
Chay Genoway	1	0	1	1	0	0
Jon DiSalvatore	1	0	0	0	0	2
Kris Fredheim	3	0	0	0	-2	2
Nick Palmieri^{†}	9	0	0	0	−3	2
Tyler Cuma	1	0	0	0	0	2
Kris Foucault	1	0	0	0	0	0
Kurtis Foster^{†}	14	0	0	0	1	4
Brad Staubitz^{‡}	43	0	0	0	−7	73

=== Goaltenders ===
Note: GP = Games played; TOI = Time on ice (minutes); W = Wins; L = Losses; OT = Overtime losses; GA = Goals against; GAA= Goals against average; SA= Shots against; SV= Saves; Sv% = Save percentage; SO= Shutouts

Regular season

Player	GP	TOI	W	L	OT	GA	GAA	SA	Sv%	SO	G	A	PIM
Niklas Backstrom	46	2590	19	18	7	105	2.43	1299	.919	4	0	2	2
Josh Harding	34	1855	13	12	4	81	2.62	981	.917	2	0	0	0
Matt Hackett	12	556	3	6	0	22	2.37	282	.922	0	0	0	0

^{†}Denotes player spent time with another team before joining Wild. Stats reflect time with Wild only.
^{‡}Traded mid-season. Stats reflect time with Wild only.

== Awards and records ==
=== Awards ===
Regular Season
Player	Award	Awarded
Josh Harding	NHL First Star of the Week	November 7, 2011
Matt Hackett	NHL Second Star of the Week	December 12, 2011

=== Milestones ===
Regular Season
Player	Milestone	Reached
Brett Bulmer	1st Career NHL Game	October 8, 2011
Marco Scandella	1st Career NHL Goal	October 8, 2011
Brett Bulmer	1st Career NHL Assist; 1st Career NHL Point	October 10, 2011
Guillaume Latendresse	300th Career NHL Game	October 10, 2011
Greg Zanon	400th Career NHL Game	October 20, 2011
Dany Heatley	700th Career NHL Point	November 12, 2011
Pierre-Marc Bouchard	500th Career NHL Game	November 13, 2011
Warren Peters	1st Career NHL Assist	November 15, 2011
Kris Fredheim	1st Career NHL Game	November 17, 2011
Nick Schultz	700th Career NHL Game	November 17, 2011
Mikko Koivu	100th Career NHL Goal	November 28, 2011
David McIntyre	1st Career NHL Game	November 28, 2011
Matt Hackett	1st Career NHL Game; 1st Career NHL Win	December 6, 2011
Niklas Backstrom	300th Career NHL Game	December 10, 2011
Dany Heatley	700th Career NHL Game	December 13, 2011
Jarod Palmer	1st Career NHL Game	December 17, 2011
Jarod Palmer	1st Career NHL Goal; 1st Career NHL Point	December 29, 2011
Matt Cullen	1,000th Career NHL Game	January 10, 2012
Josh Harding	100th Career NHL Game	January 10, 2012
David McIntyre	1st Career NHL Assist; 1st Career NHL Point	January 10, 2012
David McIntyre	1st Career NHL Goal	January 14, 2012
Devin Setoguchi	300th Career NHL Game	January 17, 2012
Clayton Stoner	100th Career NHL Game	January 19, 2012
Chad Rau	1st Career NHL Game; 1st Career NHL Goal; 1st Career NHL Point	January 21, 2012
Justin Falk	1st Career NHL Goal	January 24, 2012
Jared Spurgeon	100th Career NHL Game	January 24, 2012
Niklas Backstrom	25th Career NHL Shutout	February 2, 2012
Nate Prosser	1st Career NHL Goal	February 7, 2012
Kris Foucault	1st Career NHL Game	February 14, 2012
Kyle Brodziak	400th Career NHL Game	February 28, 2012
Matt Kassian	1st Career NHL Goal	March 1, 2012
Devin Setoguchi	100th Career NHL Goal	March 1, 2012
Stephane Veilleux	100th Career NHL Point	March 11, 2012
Jason Zucker	1st Career NHL Game	March 29, 2012
Cal Clutterbuck	300th Career NHL Game	March 31, 2012
Tom Gilbert	400th Career NHL Game	March 31, 2012
Jason Zucker	1st Career NHL Assist; 1st Career NHL Point	March 31, 2012
Cal Clutterbuck	100th Career NHL Point	April 5, 2012
Tyler Cuma	1st Career NHL Game	April 5, 2012
Chay Genoway	1st Career NHL Game; 1st Career NHL Assist; 1st Career NHL Point	April 7, 2012

== Transactions ==
The Wild have been involved in the following transactions during the 2011–12 season.

=== Trades ===
Date	Details
June 16, 2011	To New Jersey Devils Maxim Noreau	To Minnesota Wild David McIntyre
June 24, 2011	To San Jose Sharks Brent Burns; 2nd-round pick in 2012	To Minnesota Wild Devin Setoguchi; Charlie Coyle; 1st-round pick in 2011
June 25, 2011	To Vancouver Canucks 3rd-round pick in 2011; 4th-round pick in 2011	To Minnesota Wild 2nd-round pick in 2011
June 27, 2011	To Philadelphia Flyers 3rd-round pick in 2013	To Minnesota Wild Darroll Powe
July 3, 2011	To San Jose Sharks Martin Havlat	To Minnesota Wild Dany Heatley
August 7, 2011	To San Jose Sharks James Sheppard	To Minnesota Wild 3rd-round pick in 2013
October 12, 2011	To Dallas Stars Eric Nystrom	To Minnesota Wild Future considerations
February 3, 2012	To New York Rangers Casey Wellman	To Minnesota Wild Erik Christensen; Conditional 7th-round pick in 2013 (Note: Condition satisfied.)
February 24, 2012	To New Jersey Devils Marek Zidlicky	To Minnesota Wild Kurtis Foster; Nick Palmieri; Stephane Veilleux; 2nd-round pick in 2012; Conditional 3rd-round pick in 2013 (Note: Condition satisfied.)
February 27, 2012	To Edmonton Oilers Nick Schultz	To Minnesota Wild Tom Gilbert
February 27, 2012	To Boston Bruins Greg Zanon	To Minnesota Wild Steven Kampfer

=== Free agents signed ===
Player	Former team	Contract terms
Jeff Taffe	Chicago Blackhawks	1 year, $600,000
Mike Lundin	Tampa Bay Lightning	1 year, $1 million
Kris Fredheim	Houston Aeros	1 year, $530,000 entry-level contract
Paul Deutsch	Amateur Beer League Team	Signed as Free Agent, Amateur tryout contract

=== Free agents lost ===
Player	New team	Contract terms
Jean-Michel Daoust	Straubing Tigers	1 year
Jose Theodore	Florida Panthers	2 years, $3 million
Andrew Brunette	Chicago Blackhawks	1 year, $2 million
Chuck Kobasew	Colorado Avalanche	2 years, $2.5 million
Cam Barker	Edmonton Oilers	1 year, $2.25 million
Antti Miettinen	Ak Bars Kazan	undisclosed
Patrick O'Sullivan	Phoenix Coyotes	1 year, $625,000
John Madden	Florida Panthers	1 year, $600,000

=== Claimed via waivers ===
Player	Former team	Date claimed off waivers
Nick Johnson	Pittsburgh Penguins	September 29, 2011

=== Lost via waivers ===
Player	New team	Date claimed off waivers
Colton Gillies	Columbus Blue Jackets	January 14, 2012
Brad Staubitz	Montreal Canadiens	February 27, 2012

=== Player signings ===
Player	Date	Contract terms
Johan Larsson	May 24, 2011	3 years, $2.38 million entry-level contract
Darcy Kuemper	May 26, 2011	3 years, $2.330 million entry-level contract
Kris Foucault	May 27, 2011	3 years, $1.66 million entry-level contract
Nate Prosser	June 20, 2011	1 year, $715,000
Josh Harding	July 1, 2011	1 year, $750,000
Drew Bagnall	July 1, 2011	2 years, $1.225 million
Jed Ortmeyer	July 1, 2011	1 year, $585,000
Kyle Medvec	July 1, 2011	2 years, $1.14 million entry-level contract
Darroll Powe	July 5, 2011	3 years, $3.2 million
Colton Gillies	July 6, 2011	2 years, $1.25 million
Jonas Brodin	July 12, 2011	3 years, $2.775 million entry-level contract
Justin Falk	July 15, 2011	1 year, $605,000
Jarod Palmer	July 15, 2011	1 year, $735,000
Jeff Penner	July 15, 2011	1 year, $525,000
Casey Wellman	July 15, 2011	1 year, $850,500
Zack Phillips	December 19, 2011	3 years, $2.775 million entry-level contract
Nate Prosser	February 6, 2012	2 years, $1.65 million contract extension
Kyle Brodziak	February 19, 2012	3 years, $8.5 million contract extension
Charlie Coyle	March 1, 2012	3 years, $2.7 million entry-level contract
Jason Zucker	March 27, 2012	3 years, $2.315 million entry-level contract
Clayton Stoner	May 10, 2012	2 years, $2.1 million contract extension
Mikael Granlund	May 22, 2012	3 years, $2.7 million entry-level contract
Johan Gustafsson	May 31, 2012	3 years, $1.995 million entry-level contract

== Draft picks ==
Minnesota's picks at the 2011 NHL entry draft in St. Paul, Minnesota.

Round	#	Player	Position	Nationality	College/Junior/Club team (League)
1	10	Jonas Brodin	D	Sweden	Farjestad BK (Elitserien)
1	28 (from San Jose)	Zack Phillips	C	Canada	Saint John Sea Dogs (QMJHL)
2	60 (from Vancouver)	Mario Lucia	LW	United States	Wayzata High School (USHS-MN)
5	131	Nick Seeler	D	United States	Eden Prairie High School (USHS-MN)
6	161	Stephen Michalek	G	United States	Loomis Chaffee School (USHS-CT)
7	191	Tyler Graovac	C	Canada	Ottawa 67's (OHL)

== See also ==
- 2011–12 NHL season
