= 2011–12 Nashville Predators season =

Professional ice hockey team season

2011–12 Nashville Predators
- Division: 2nd Central
- Conference: 4th Western
- 2011–12 record: 48–26–8
- Home record: 26–10–5
- Road record: 21–16–3
- Goals for: 231
- Goals against: 209

Team information
- General manager: David Poile
- Coach: Barry Trotz
- Captain: Shea Weber
- Alternate captains: Mike Fisher; Ryan Suter
- Arena: Bridgestone Arena
- Average attendance: 16,690 (97.5%)

Team leaders
- Goals: Patric Hornqvist (27)
- Assists: Martin Erat (39); Ryan Suter (39)
- Points: Martin Erat (58)
- Penalty minutes: Jordin Tootoo (92)
- Plus/minus: Shea Weber (19)
- Wins: Pekka Rinne (43)
- Goals against average: Pekka Rinne (2.40)

The 2011–12 Nashville Predators season was the club's 14th season in the National Hockey League (NHL).

== Off-season ==
On June 22, 2011, the Predators revealed a new team logo, secondary logo and wordmarks. The Predators new away jerseys were unveiled at the 2011 NHL entry draft and their new home jerseys were unveiled at an event on July 13.

== Regular season ==
In November 2011, it was announced that W. Brett Wilson had purchased a 5% interest in the Nashville Predators.

The Predators were involved in some controversy when it was announced that Alexander Radulov would make his return to the Predators after leaving for the Kontinental Hockey League (KHL) in 2008. Radulov, still in his final year of his entry-level contract with the Predators, did not need to clear waivers to return to the Predators.

The Predators finished the season with the league's best power-play percentage at 21.60% (54 for 250).

== Playoffs ==
The Predators ended the 2011–12 regular season as the Western Conference's fourth seed. They defeated the fifth-seeded Detroit Red Wings in the first round series, 4–1. The Predators lost in the second round to the Phoenix Coyotes. During the series against the Coyotes, Alexander Radulov and Andrei Kostitsyn were suspended by the team for being seen in a bar, breaking curfew.

== Standings ==
Central Division
Pos	Team	GP	W	L	OTL	ROW	GF	GA	GD	Pts
1	y – St. Louis Blues	82	49	22	11	45	210	165	+45	109
2	x – Nashville Predators	82	48	26	8	43	237	210	+27	104
3	x – Detroit Red Wings	82	48	28	6	39	248	203	+45	102
4	x – Chicago Blackhawks	82	45	26	11	38	248	238	+10	101
5	Columbus Blue Jackets	82	29	46	7	25	202	262	−60	65

Source: National Hockey League
x – Clinched playoff spot; y – Clinched division

Western Conference
Pos	Div	Team	GP	W	L	OTL	ROW	GF	GA	GD	Pts
1	NW	p – Vancouver Canucks	82	51	22	9	43	249	198	+51	111
2	CE	y – St. Louis Blues	82	49	22	11	45	210	165	+45	109
3	PA	y – Phoenix Coyotes	82	42	27	13	36	216	204	+12	97
4	CE	x – Nashville Predators	82	48	26	8	43	237	210	+27	104
5	CE	x – Detroit Red Wings	82	48	28	6	39	248	203	+45	102
6	CE	x – Chicago Blackhawks	82	45	26	11	38	248	238	+10	101
7	PA	x – San Jose Sharks	82	43	29	10	34	228	210	+18	96
8	PA	x – Los Angeles Kings	82	40	27	15	34	194	179	+15	95
9	NW	Calgary Flames	82	37	29	16	34	202	226	−24	90
10	PA	Dallas Stars	82	42	35	5	35	211	222	−11	89
11	NW	Colorado Avalanche	82	41	35	6	32	208	220	−12	88
12	NW	Minnesota Wild	82	35	36	11	24	177	226	−49	81
13	PA	Anaheim Ducks	82	34	36	12	31	204	231	−27	80
14	NW	Edmonton Oilers	82	32	40	10	27	212	239	−27	74
15	CE	Columbus Blue Jackets	82	29	46	7	25	202	262	−60	65

Source: National Hockey League
p – Clinched Presidents' Trophy; x – Clinched playoff spot; y – Clinched division

== Schedule and results ==
=== Pre-season ===
2011 pre-season game log: 0–0–0 (home: 0–0–0; road: 0–0–0)
#	Date	Visitor	Score	Home	OT	Decision	Record	Recap
1	September 19 (split-squad)	Nashville Predators	–	Florida Panthers
2	September 19 (split-squad)	Nashville Predators	–	Florida Panthers
3	September 20 (in Baltimore, MD)	Nashville Predators	–	Washington Capitals
4	September 23	Nashville Predators	–	Carolina Hurricanes
5	September 24	Winnipeg Jets	–	Nashville Predators
6	September 28	Washington Capitals	–	Nashville Predators
7	September 30	Nashville Predators	–	Winnipeg Jets
8	October 1	Carolina Hurricanes	–	Nashville Predators

=== Regular season ===
2011–12 game log

October: 5–4–2 (home: 2–2–1; road: 3–2–1) Pts. 12
#	Date	Visitor	Score	Home	OT	Decision	Attendance	Record	Pts	Recap
1	October 7	Nashville Predators	3–2	Columbus Blue Jackets		Pekka Rinne	18,247	1–0–0	2	Recap
2	October 8	Nashville Predators	4–2	St. Louis Blues		Pekka Rinne	19,150	2–0–0	4	Recap
3	October 13	Phoenix Coyotes	5–2	Nashville Predators		Pekka Rinne	17,113	2–1–0	4	Recap
4	October 15	New Jersey Devils	3–2	Nashville Predators	SO	Pekka Rinne	17,113	2–1–1	5	Recap
5	October 17	Nashville Predators	1–3	Edmonton Oilers		Pekka Rinne	16,839	2–2–1	5	Recap
6	October 20	Nashville Predators	1–5	Vancouver Canucks		Pekka Rinne	18,860	2–3–1	5	Recap
7	October 22	Nashville Predators	2–0	Calgary Flames		Pekka Rinne	19,289	3–3–1	7	Recap
8	October 25	San Jose Sharks	3–1	Nashville Predators		Pekka Rinne	15,121	3–4–1	7	Recap
9	October 27	Tampa Bay Lightning	3–5	Nashville Predators		Pekka Rinne	16,619	4–4–1	9	Recap
10	October 29	Anaheim Ducks	0–3	Nashville Predators		Pekka Rinne	16,395	5–4–1	11	Recap
11	October 31	Nashville Predators	4–5	Chicago Blackhawks	OT	Pekka Rinne	20,721	5–4–2	12	Recap

November: 6–5–2 (home: 2–1–2; road: 4–4–0) Pts. 14
#	Date	Visitor	Score	Home	OT	Decision	Attendance	Record	Pts	Recap
12	November 3	Nashville Predators	3–0	Phoenix Coyotes		Pekka Rinne	6,738	6–4–2	14	Recap
13	November 5	Nashville Predators	4–3	San Jose Sharks	OT	Pekka Rinne	17,562	7–4–2	16	Recap
14	November 8	Nashville Predators	3–4	Los Angeles Kings		Anders Lindback	17,963	7–5–2	16	Recap
15	November 9	Nashville Predators	4–2	Anaheim Ducks		Pekka Rinne	13,529	8–5–2	18	Recap
16	November 12	Montreal Canadiens	2–1	Nashville Predators	OT	Pekka Rinne	17,113	8–5–3	19	Recap
17	November 15	Washington Capitals	1–3	Nashville Predators		Pekka Rinne	14,863	9–5–3	21	Recap
18	November 17	Toronto Maple Leafs	1–4	Nashville Predators		Pekka Rinne	16,135	10–5–3	23	Recap
19	November 19	Columbus Blue Jackets	4–3	Nashville Predators	OT	Pekka Rinne	16,776	10–5–4	24	Recap
20	November 22	Edmonton Oilers	6–2	Nashville Predators		Pekka Rinne	16,836	10–6–4	24	Recap
21	November 23	Nashville Predators	2–3	Minnesota Wild		Pekka Rinne	16,981	10–7–4	24	Recap
22	November 26	Nashville Predators	1–4	Detroit Red Wings		Pekka Rinne	20,066	10–8–4	24	Recap
23	November 28	Nashville Predators	2–1	Edmonton Oilers		Anders Lindback	16,839	11–8–4	26	Recap
24	November 29	Nashville Predators	0–1	Calgary Flames		Pekka Rinne	19,289	11–9–4	26	Recap

December: 9–5–0 (home: 6–3–0; road: 3–2–0) Pts. 18
#	Date	Visitor	Score	Home	OT	Decision	Attendance	Record	Pts	Recap
25	December 1	Nashville Predators	6–5	Vancouver Canucks		Pekka Rinne	18,890	12–9–4	28	Recap
26	December 3	Buffalo Sabres	3–2	Nashville Predators		Anders Lindback	17,113	12–10–4	28	Recap
27	December 6	Phoenix Coyotes	3–2	Nashville Predators		Pekka Rinne	15,638	12–11–4	28	Recap
28	December 8	Nashville Predators	4–3	Columbus Blue Jackets	ОТ	Pekka Rinne	13,852	13–11–4	30	Recap
29	December 10	Anaheim Ducks	2–3	Nashville Predators		Pekka Rinne	17,113	14–11–4	32	Recap
30	December 13	Calgary Flames	1–2	Nashville Predators		Pekka Rinne	14,813	15–11–4	34	Recap
31	December 15	Detroit Red Wings	3–4	Nashville Predators		Pekka Rinne	17,113	16–11–4	36	Recap
32	December 17	St. Louis Blues	1–2	Nashville Predators	SO	Pekka Rinne	17,113	17–11–4	38	Recap
33	December 20	Nashville Predators	1–4	Washington Capitals		Anders Lindback	18,506	17–12–4	38	Recap
34	December 22	Columbus Blue Jackets	5–6	Nashville Predators		Pekka Rinne	17,113	18–12–4	40	Recap
35	December 23	Nashville Predators	3–6	Dallas Stars		Pekka Rinne	15,245	18–13–4	40	Recap
36	December 26	Detroit Red Wings	4–1	Nashville Predators		Pekka Rinne	17,113	18–14–4	40	Recap
37	December 28	Minnesota Wild	1–2	Nashville Predators	SO	Pekka Rinne	17,113	19–14–4	42	Recap
38	December 30	Nashville Predators	2–1	St. Louis Blues	SO	Pekka Rinne	19,150	20–14–4	44	Recap

January: 11–2–0 (home: 6–1–0; road: 5–1–0) Pts. 22
#	Date	Visitor	Score	Home	OT	Decision	Attendance	Record	Pts	Recap
39	January 1	Calgary Flames	3–5	Nashville Predators		Pekka Rinne	17,113	21–14–4	46	Recap
40	January 5	Dallas Stars	4–1	Nashville Predators		Pekka Rinne	17,113	21–15–4	46	Recap
41	January 7	Carolina Hurricanes	2–5	Nashville Predators		Pekka Rinne	17,113	22–15–4	48	Recap
42	January 10	Nashville Predators	4–1	Colorado Avalanche		Pekka Rinne	14,417	23–15–4	50	Recap
43	January 12	Colorado Avalanche	2–3	Nashville Predators	OT	Pekka Rinne	16,905	24–15–4	52	Recap
44	January 14	Philadelphia Flyers	2–4	Nashville Predators		Pekka Rinne	17,113	25–15–4	54	Recap
45	January 16	Nashville Predators	3–1	New York Islanders		Pekka Rinne	10,755	26–15–4	56	Recap
46	January 17	Nashville Predators	0–3	New York Rangers		Anders Lindback	18,200	26–16–4	56	Recap
47	January 19	Nashville Predators	3–0	Columbus Blue Jackets		Pekka Rinne	17,233	27–16–4	58	Recap
48	January 21	Chicago Blackhawks	2–5	Nashville Predators		Pekka Rinne	17,113	28–16–4	60	Recap
49	January 23	Columbus Blue Jackets	1–4	Nashville Predators		Pekka Rinne	14,310	29–16–4	62	Recap
50	January 24	Nashville Predators	3–1	Chicago Blackhawks		Pekka Rinne	21,279	30–16–4	64	Recap
51	January 31	Nashville Predators	5–4	Minnesota Wild		Pekka Rinne	17,325	31–16–4	66	Recap

February: 6–4–3 (home: 5–0–2; road: 1–4–1) Pts. 15
#	Date	Visitor	Score	Home	OT	Decision	Attendance	Record	Pts	Recap
52	February 2	Nashville Predators	1–4	Philadelphia Flyers		Anders Lindback	19,823	31–17–4	66	Recap
53	February 4	St. Louis Blues	1–3	Nashville Predators		Pekka Rinne	17,113	32–17–4	68	Recap
54	February 7	Vancouver Canucks	4–3	Nashville Predators	SO	Pekka Rinne	16,232	32–17–5	69	Recap
55	February 9	Nashville Predators	3–4	Ottawa Senators		Pekka Rinne	18,592	32–18–5	69	Recap
56	February 11	Nashville Predators	3–4	Boston Bruins	SO	Pekka Rinne	17,565	32–18–6	70	Recap
57	February 14	Chicago Blackhawks	2–3	Nashville Predators		Pekka Rinne	16,592	33–18–6	72	Recap
58	February 17	Nashville Predators	1–2	Detroit Red Wings		Pekka Rinne	20,066	33–19–6	72	Recap
59	February 19	Nashville Predators	3–2	Dallas Stars		Pekka Rinne	11,865	34–19–6	74	Recap
60	February 21	Vancouver Canucks	1–3	Nashville Predators		Pekka Rinne	16,769	35–19–6	76	Recap
61	February 23	St. Louis Blues	3–2	Nashville Predators	SO	Pekka Rinne	16,828	35–19–7	77	Recap
62	February 25	San Jose Sharks	2–6	Nashville Predators		Pekka Rinne	17,113	36–19–7	79	Recap
63	February 27	Los Angeles Kings	1–2	Nashville Predators		Pekka Rinne	15,665	37–19–7	81	Recap
64	February 28	Nashville Predators	3–4	Carolina Hurricanes		Anders Lindback	13,595	37–20–7	81	Recap

March: 8–6–1 (home: 3–3–0; road: 5–3–1)
#	Date	Visitor	Score	Home	OT	Decision	Attendance	Record	Pts	Recap
65	March 3	Nashville Predators	3–1	Florida Panthers		Pekka Rinne	15,904	38–20–7	83	Recap
66	March 6	Los Angeles Kings	5–4	Nashville Predators		Pekka Rinne	17,113	38–21–7	83	Recap
67	March 8	Colorado Avalanche	2–4	Nashville Predators		Pekka Rinne	17,113	39–21–7	85	Recap
68	March 10	Detroit Red Wings	2–3	Nashville Predators		Pekka Rinne	17,113	40–21–7	87	Recap
69	March 12	Nashville Predators	5–4	Phoenix Coyotes	SO	Pekka Rinne	11,518	41–21–7	89	Recap
70	March 15	Nashville Predators	1–2	San Jose Sharks	SO	Pekka Rinne	17,562	41–21–8	90	Recap
71	March 17	Nashville Predators	2–4	Los Angeles Kings		Pekka Rinne	18,118	41–22–8	90	Recap
72	March 18	Nashville Predators	3–1	Anaheim Ducks		Anders Lindback	14,978	42–22–8	92	Recap
73	March 20	Edmonton Oilers	6–3	Nashville Predators		Anders Lindback	17,113	42–23–8	92	Recap
74	March 22	Nashville Predators	1–5	Pittsburgh Penguins		Pekka Rinne	18,579	42–24–8	92	Recap
75	March 24	Winnipeg Jets	1–3	Nashville Predators		Pekka Rinne	17,113	43–24–8	94	Recap
76	March 25	Nashville Predators	6–1	Chicago Blackhawks		Pekka Rinne	21,463	44–24–8	96	Recap
77	March 27	Nashville Predators	0–3	St. Louis Blues		Pekka Rinne	19,150	44–25–8	96	Recap
78	March 30	Nashville Predators	4–1	Detroit Red Wings		Pekka Rinne	20,066	45–25–8	98	Recap
79	March 31	Chicago Blackhawks	5–4	Nashville Predators		Pekka Rinne	17,113	45–26–8	98	Recap

April: 3–0–0 (home: 2–0–0; road: 1–0–0)
#	Date	Visitor	Score	Home	OT	Decision	Attendance	Record	Pts	Recap
80	April 3	Minnesota Wild	1–2	Nashville Predators	SO	Anders Lindback	17,113	46–26–8	100	Recap
81	April 5	Dallas Stars	0–2	Nashville Predators		Pekka Rinne	17,113	47–26–8	102	Recap
82	April 7	Nashville Predators	6–1	Colorado Avalanche		Anders Lindback	18,007	48–26–8	104	Recap

Legend: Win (2 points) Loss (0 points) Overtime/shootout loss (1 point)

=== Playoffs ===
2012 Stanley Cup playoffs

Western Conference Quarter-final vs. (5) Detroit Red Wings – Predators win series 4–1
Game	Date	Opponent	Score	OT	Decision	Arena	Attendance	Series	Recap
1	April 11	Detroit Red Wings	3–2		Pekka Rinne	Bridgestone Arena	17,113	Predators lead 1–0	Recap
2	April 13	Detroit Red Wings	2–3		Pekka Rinne	Bridgestone Arena	17,113	Series tied 1–1	Recap
3	April 15	@ Detroit Red Wings	3–2		Pekka Rinne	Joe Louis Arena	20,066	Predators lead 2–1	Recap
4	April 17	@ Detroit Red Wings	3–1		Pekka Rinne	Joe Louis Arena	20,066	Predators lead 3–1	Recap
5	April 20	Detroit Red Wings	2–1		Pekka Rinne	Bridgestone Arena	17,527	Predators win 4–1	Recap

Western Conference Semifinal vs. (3) Phoenix Coyotes – Coyotes win series 4–1
Game	Date	Opponent	Score	OT	Decision	Arena	Attendance	Series	Recap
1	April 27	@ Phoenix Coyotes	3–4	OT	Pekka Rinne	Jobing.com Arena	17,187	Coyotes lead 1-0	Recap
2	April 29	@ Phoenix Coyotes	4–5		Pekka Rinne	Jobing.com Arena	17,217	Coyotes lead 2-0	Recap
3	May 2	Phoenix Coyotes	2-0		Pekka Rinne	Bridgestone Arena	17,113	Coyotes lead 2-1	Recap
4	May 4	Phoenix Coyotes	0-1		Pekka Rinne	Bridgestone Arena	17,113	Coyotes lead 3-1	Recap
5	May 7	@ Phoenix Coyotes	1-2		Pekka Rinne	Jobing.com Arena	17,182	Coyotes win 4-1	Recap

== Player statistics ==
=== Skaters ===
Note: GP = Games played; G = Goals; A = Assists; Pts = Points; +/− = Plus/minus; PIM = Penalty minutes

Regular season

Player	GP	G	A	Pts	+/−	PIM
Martin Erat	71	19	39	58	12	30
David Legwand	78	19	34	53	3	26
Mike Fisher	72	24	27	51	11	33
Shea Weber	78	19	30	49	21	46
Ryan Suter	79	7	39	46	15	30
Sergei Kostitsyn	75	17	26	43	8	34
Patric Hornqvist	76	27	16	43	9	28
Craig Smith	72	14	22	36	−9	30
Colin Wilson	68	15	20	35	5	21
Jordin Tootoo	77	6	24	30	−5	92
Matt Halischuk	73	15	13	28	9	27
Nick Spaling	77	10	12	22	−7	18
Kevin Klein	66	4	17	21	−8	4
Gabriel Bourque	43	7	12	19	−2	6
Roman Josi	52	5	11	16	1	14
Andrei Kostitsyn^{†}	19	4	8	12	7	10
Francis Bouillon	66	4	7	11	−4	33
Ryan Ellis	32	3	8	11	5	4
Jonathon Blum	33	3	4	7	−14	6
Alexander Radulov	9	3	4	7	3	4
Brandon Yip^{†}	25	3	4	7	0	20
Jack Hillen	55	2	4	6	6	20
Hal Gill^{†}	23	0	5	5	4	8
Jerred Smithson^{‡}	52	1	4	5	−7	30
Paul Gaustad^{†}	14	0	4	4	0	6
Blake Geoffrion^{‡}	22	0	3	3	−2	17
Brian McGrattan	30	0	2	2	−1	61
Niclas Bergfors^{‡}	11	1	1	2	−2	2
Cal O'Reilly^{‡}	5	0	1	1	−2	2
Zack Stortini	1	0	0	0	0	7
Kyle Wilson	5	0	0	0	−1	0
Teemu Laakso	9	0	0	0	−1	8
Ryan Thang	1	0	0	0	0	0
Chris Mueller	4	0	0	0	−1	0
Mattias Ekholm	2	0	0	0	−1	0

Playoffs

Player	GP	G	A	Pts	+/−	PIM
David Legwand	10	3	3	6	3	10
Alexander Radulov	8	1	5	6	2	4
Gabriel Bourque	10	3	2	5	0	4
Mike Fisher	10	1	3	4	-4	8
Martin Erat	10	1	3	4	-1	6
Ryan Suter	10	1	3	4	-3	4
Andrei Kostitsyn	8	3	1	4	3	2
Kevin Klein	10	2	2	4	-2	2
Patric Hornqvist	10	1	3	4	1	2
Francis Bouillon	10	0	3	3	7	2
Shea Weber	10	2	1	3	-1	9
Nick Spaling	10	0	3	3	4	0
Paul Gaustad	10	1	1	2	-1	5
Brandon Yip	10	1	1	2	-1	6
Sergei Kostitsyn	10	1	1	2	-3	4
Matt Halischuk	5	0	1	1	1	4
Colin Wilson	4	1	0	1	1	0
Craig Smith	2	0	1	1	-1	0
Hal Gill	5	0	0	0	2	0
Jordin Tootoo	3	0	0	0	0	4
Jack Hillen	2	0	0	0	1	2
Roman Josi	10	0	0	0	-4	10
Ryan Ellis	3	0	0	0	2	0

=== Goaltenders ===
Note: GP = Games played; TOI = Time on ice (minutes); W = Wins; L = Losses; OT = Overtime losses; GA = Goals against; GAA= Goals against average; SA= Shots against; SV= Saves; Sv% = Save percentage; SO= Shutouts

Regular season

Player	GP	TOI	W	L	OT	GA	GAA	SA	Sv%	SO	G	A	PIM
Pekka Rinne	73	4169	43	18	8	166	2.39	2153	.923	5	0	5	0
Anders Lindback	16	792	5	8	0	32	2.42	364	.912	0	0	1	0

Playoffs

Player	GP	TOI	W	L	GA	GAA	SA	Sv%	SO	G	A	PIM
Pekka Rinne	10	609	5	5	21	2.07	296	.929	1	0	0	2

^{†}Denotes player spent time with another team before joining Predators. Stats reflect time with the Predators only.
^{‡}Traded mid-season
Bold/italics denotes franchise record

== Awards and records ==
=== Awards ===
Regular season
Player	Award	Awarded
Pekka Rinne	NHL Second Star of the Week	December 19, 2011
Pekka Rinne	NHL Second Star of the Week	January 30, 2012
Pekka Rinne	NHL Third Star of the Month	January 2012
Martin Erat	NHL Third Star of the Week	March 19, 2012

=== Milestones ===
Regular season
Player	Milestone	Reached
Craig Smith	1st Career NHL Game; 1st Career NHL Goal; 1st Career NHL Point	October 7, 2011
Craig Smith	1st Career NHL Assist	October 8, 2011
Mattias Ekholm	1st Career NHL Game	October 13, 2011
Pekka Rinne	100th Career NHL Win	October 29, 2011
Ryan Thang	1st Career NHL Game	October 31, 2011
Francis Bouillon	100th Career NHL Assist	November 5, 2011
Patric Hornqvist	200th Career NHL Game	November 8, 2011
Ryan Suter	200th Career NHL Point	November 8, 2011
Nashville Predators franchise	1,000th NHL Game	November 12, 2011
Jordin Tootoo	100th Career NHL Point	November 22, 2011
Roman Josi	1st Career NHL Game	November 26, 2011
Pekka Rinne	200th Career NHL Game	December 1, 2011
Roman Josi	1st Career NHL Assist; 1st Career NHL Point	December 3, 2011
Jerred Smithson	500th Career NHL Game	December 3, 2011
Jack Hillen	200th Career NHL Game	December 6, 2011
Brian McGrattan	200th Career NHL Game	December 8, 2011
Roman Josi	1st Career NHL Goal	December 10, 2011
Ryan Ellis	1st Career NHL Game	December 26, 2011
David Legwand	800th Career NHL Game	December 26, 2011
Gabriel Bourque	1st Career NHL Game	December 28, 2011
Ryan Suter	500th Career NHL Game	December 28, 2011
Gabriel Bourque	1st Career NHL Goal; 1st Career NHL Point	January 5, 2012
Ryan Ellis	1st Career NHL Goal; 1st Career NHL Assist; 1st Career NHL Point	January 7, 2012
Mike Fisher	200th Career NHL Assist	January 7, 2012
Gabriel Bourque	1st Career NHL Assist	January 10, 2012
Matt Halischuk	100th Career NHL Game	February 4, 2012
David Legwand	300th Career NHL Assist	February 14, 2012
Andrei Kostitsyn	100th Career NHL Goal	March 3, 2012
Mike Fisher	400th Career NHL Point	March 6, 2012
Martin Erat	300th Career NHL Assist	March 18, 2012
Kevin Klein	300th Career NHL Game	March 20, 2012
Sergei Kostitsyn	300th Career NHL Game	March 22, 2012
Alexander Radulov	100th Career NHL Point	March 30, 2012
David Legwand	500th Career NHL Point	March 31, 2012
Ryan Suter	200th Career NHL Assist	March 31, 2012
Pekka Rinne	25th Career NHL Shutout	April 5, 2012

== Transactions ==
The Predators have been involved in the following transactions during the 2011–12 season.

=== Trades ===
Date	Details
June 2, 2011	To Washington Capitals Taylor Stefishen	To Nashville Predators Conditional 7th-round pick in 2013 (Note: Condition not satisfied.)
June 25, 2011	To Los Angeles Kings 3rd-round pick in 2011	To Nashville Predators 6th-round pick in 2011; 3rd-round pick in 2012
June 25, 2011	To New York Rangers 6th-round pick in 2011	To Nashville Predators 6th-round pick in 2012
July 2, 2011	To New York Rangers Andreas Thuresson	To Nashville Predators Brodie Dupont
July 3, 2011	To Toronto Maple Leafs Cody Franson; Matthew Lombardi; Conditional 4th-round pick in 2013 (Note: Condition satisfied.)	To Nashville Predators Brett Lebda; Robert Slaney; Conditional 4th-round pick in 2013 (Note: Condition satisfied.)
October 28, 2011	To Phoenix Coyotes Cal O'Reilly	To Nashville Predators 4th-round pick in 2012
February 17, 2012	To Montreal Canadiens Blake Geoffrion; Robert Slaney; 2nd-round pick in 2012	To Nashville Predators Hal Gill; Conditional 5th-round pick in 2013 (Note: Condition satisfied.)
February 24, 2012	To Florida Panthers Jerred Smithson	To Nashville Predators 6th-round pick in 2012
February 27, 2012	To Montreal Canadiens 2nd-round pick in 2013; Cancellation of 5th-round pick (formerly conditional) in 2013	To Nashville Predators Andrei Kostitsyn
February 27, 2012	To Buffalo Sabres 1st-round pick in 2012	To Nashville Predators Paul Gaustad; 4th-round pick in 2013

=== Free agents signed ===
Player	Former team	Contract terms
Victor Bartley	Rogle BK	2 years, $1.05 million
Juuso Puustinen	HPK	2 years, $1.22 million
Niclas Bergfors	Florida Panthers	1 year, $575,000
Zack Stortini	Edmonton Oilers	1 year, $550,000
Kyle Wilson	Columbus Blue Jackets	2 years, $1.1 million
Tyler Sloan	Washington Capitals	1 year, $650,000
Jack Hillen	New York Islanders	1 year, $650,000
Scott Valentine	Oshawa Generals	3 years, $1.695 million entry-level contract
Jack MacLellan	Brown University	1 year, $692,500 entry-level contract
Joonas Jarvinen	Pelicans	2 years, entry-level contract
Daniel Bang	AIK IF	1 year, $925,000

=== Free agents lost ===
Player	New team	Contract terms
Marcel Goc	Florida Panthers	3 years, $5.1 million
Steve Sullivan	Pittsburgh Penguins	1 year, $1.5 million
Joel Ward	Washington Capitals	4 years, $12 million
Mark Dekanich	Columbus Blue Jackets	1 year, $575,000
Shane O'Brien	Colorado Avalanche	1 year, $1.1 million

=== Claimed via waivers ===
Player	Former team	Date claimed off waivers
Brian McGrattan	Anaheim Ducks	October 11, 2011
Brandon Yip	Colorado Avalanche	January 19, 2012

=== Lost via waivers ===
Player	New team	Date claimed off waivers

=== Player signings ===
Player	Date	Contract terms
Mattias Ekholm	May 12, 2011	3 years, $2.7 million entry-level contract
Teemu Laakso	June 15, 2011	1 year, $675,000
Matthew Halischuk	July 7, 2011	2 years, $1.425 million
Chris Mueller	July 7, 2011	1 year, $550,000
Cal O'Reilly	July 7, 2011	1 year, $1.05 million
Nick Spaling	July 7, 2011	2 years, $2.1 million
Sergei Kostitsyn	July 8, 2011	1 year, $2.5 million
Brodie Dupont	July 8, 2011	1 year, $550,000
Craig Smith	July 26, 2011	2 years, $1.43 million entry-level contract
Shea Weber	August 3, 2011	1 year, $7.5 million
Pekka Rinne	November 3, 2011	7 years, $49 million contract extension
Joonas Rask	March 23, 2012	2 years, $1.2 million entry-level contract
Anthony Bitetto	March 29, 2012	2 years, $1.23 million entry-level contract
Josh Shalla	April 18, 2012	3 years, $1.785 million entry-level contract
Patrick Cehlin	June 5, 2012	3 years, $1.77 million entry-level contract

== Draft picks ==
Nashville's picks at the 2011 NHL entry draft in St. Paul, Minnesota.

Round	Pick	Player	Position	Nationality	Previous team
2	38 (from New Jersey)	Magnus Hellberg	G	Sweden	Almtuna IS (Allsvenskan)
2	52	Miika Salomaki	RW	Finland	Karpat (SM-liiga)
4	94 (from Florida)	Josh Shalla	LW	Canada	Saginaw Spirit (OHL)
4	112	Garrett Noonan	D	United States	Boston University (Hockey East)
5	142	Simon Karlsson	D	Sweden	Malmo Redhawks (Allsvenskan)
6	170 (from Los Angeles)	Chase Balisy	C	United States	Western Michigan University (CCHA)
7	202	Brent Andrews	LW	Canada	Halifax Mooseheads (QMJHL)

== See also ==
- 2011–12 NHL season
