= 2011–12 Edmonton Oilers season =

NHL team season

2011–12 Edmonton Oilers
- Division: 5th Northwest
- Conference: 14th Western
- 2011–12 record: 32–40–10
- Home record: 18–17–6
- Road record: 14–23–4
- Goals for: 212
- Goals against: 239

Team information
- General manager: Steve Tambellini
- Coach: Tom Renney
- Captain: Shawn Horcoff
- Alternate captains: Ales Hemsky; Ryan Whitney; Ryan Smyth
- Arena: Rexall Place
- Average attendance: 16,839 (100%)
- Minor league affiliates: Oklahoma City Barons (AHL); Stockton Thunder (ECHL)

Team leaders
- Goals: Jordan Eberle (34)
- Assists: Jordan Eberle (42)
- Points: Jordan Eberle (76)
- Penalty minutes: Ben Eager (107)
- Plus/minus: Sam Gagner (+5); Andy Sutton (+5)
- Wins: Devan Dubnyk (20)
- Goals against average: Nikolai Khabibulin (2.67)

The 2011–12 Edmonton Oilers season was the 33rd season for the National Hockey League (NHL) franchise that was established on June 22, 1979, and 40th season including their play in the World Hockey Association.

The Oilers failed to qualify for the Stanley Cup playoffs, the sixth consecutive season for the first time in franchise history. They last qualified during the 2005–06 NHL season.

== Off-season ==
The Edmonton Oilers drafted first overall in the 2011 NHL entry draft, and chose Red Deer Rebels centre Ryan Nugent-Hopkins. With the 19th pick overall (obtained from the Los Angeles Kings in a trade for Dustin Penner), the Oilers chose defenceman Oscar Klefbom.

== Playoffs ==
The Oilers were eliminated from playoff contentions on March 22, 2012.

== Standings ==
Northwest Division
Pos	Team	GP	W	L	OTL	ROW	GF	GA	GD	Pts
1	p – Vancouver Canucks	82	51	22	9	43	249	198	+51	111
2	Calgary Flames	82	37	29	16	34	202	226	−24	90
3	Colorado Avalanche	82	41	35	6	32	208	220	−12	88
4	Minnesota Wild	82	35	36	11	24	177	226	−49	81
5	Edmonton Oilers	82	32	40	10	27	212	239	−27	74

Source: National Hockey League
p – Clinched Presidents' Trophy

Western Conference
Pos	Div	Team	GP	W	L	OTL	ROW	GF	GA	GD	Pts
1	NW	p – Vancouver Canucks	82	51	22	9	43	249	198	+51	111
2	CE	y – St. Louis Blues	82	49	22	11	45	210	165	+45	109
3	PA	y – Phoenix Coyotes	82	42	27	13	36	216	204	+12	97
4	CE	x – Nashville Predators	82	48	26	8	43	237	210	+27	104
5	CE	x – Detroit Red Wings	82	48	28	6	39	248	203	+45	102
6	CE	x – Chicago Blackhawks	82	45	26	11	38	248	238	+10	101
7	PA	x – San Jose Sharks	82	43	29	10	34	228	210	+18	96
8	PA	x – Los Angeles Kings	82	40	27	15	34	194	179	+15	95
9	NW	Calgary Flames	82	37	29	16	34	202	226	−24	90
10	PA	Dallas Stars	82	42	35	5	35	211	222	−11	89
11	NW	Colorado Avalanche	82	41	35	6	32	208	220	−12	88
12	NW	Minnesota Wild	82	35	36	11	24	177	226	−49	81
13	PA	Anaheim Ducks	82	34	36	12	31	204	231	−27	80
14	NW	Edmonton Oilers	82	32	40	10	27	212	239	−27	74
15	CE	Columbus Blue Jackets	82	29	46	7	25	202	262	−60	65

Source: National Hockey League
p – Clinched Presidents' Trophy; x – Clinched playoff spot; y – Clinched division

== Schedule and results ==
=== Pre-season ===
2011 Pre-season Game Log: 5–3–0 (Home: 2–2–0; Road: 2–1–0; Neutral: 1–0–0)
#	Date	Visitor	Score	Home	OT	Decision	Attendance	Record	Recap
1	September 20	Minnesota Wild	4–3	Edmonton Oilers		Khabibulin	15,653	0–1–0
2	September 20 (in Saskatoon, SK)	Edmonton Oilers	4–2	Chicago Blackhawks		Dubnyk	12,375	1–1–0
3	September 22	Vancouver Canucks	2–1	Edmonton Oilers		Dubnyk	15,724	1–2–0
4	September 24	Calgary Flames	1–2	Edmonton Oilers		Khabibulin	16,839	2–2–0
5	September 25	Edmonton Oilers	3–0	Calgary Flames		Dubnyk	19,289	3–2–0
6	September 27	Phoenix Coyotes	2–3	Edmonton Oilers		Khabibulin	16,218	4–2–0
7	September 30	Edmonton Oilers	4–3	Minnesota Wild	SO	Dubnyk	14,544	5–2–0
8	October 1	Edmonton Oilers	1–4	Vancouver Canucks		Khabibulin	18,860	5–3–0

=== Regular season ===
2011–12 Game Log

October: 7–2–2 (Home: 6–1–1; Road: 1–1–1)
#	Date	Visitor	Score	Home	OT	Decision	Attendance	Record	Pts	Recap
1	October 9	Pittsburgh Penguins	1 – 2	Edmonton Oilers	SO	Dubnyk	16,839	1–0–0	2
2	October 13	Edmonton Oilers	1 – 2	Minnesota Wild	SO	Khabibulin	15,878	1–0–1	3
3	October 15	Vancouver Canucks	4 – 3	Edmonton Oilers		Dubnyk	16,839	1–1–1	3
4	October 17	Nashville Predators	1 – 3	Edmonton Oilers		Khabibulin	16,839	2–1–1	5
5	October 18	Edmonton Oilers	1 – 2	Calgary Flames		Dubnyk	19,289	2–2–1	5
6	October 20	Minnesota Wild	2 – 1	Edmonton Oilers	SO	Khabibulin	16,839	2–2–2	6
7	October 22	New York Rangers	0 – 2	Edmonton Oilers		Khabibulin	16,839	3–2–2	8
8	October 25	Vancouver Canucks	2 – 3	Edmonton Oilers		Khabibulin	16,839	4–2–2	10
9	October 27	Washington Capitals	1 – 2	Edmonton Oilers		Khabibulin	16,839	5–2–2	12
10	October 28	Edmonton Oilers	3 – 1	Colorado Avalanche		Dubnyk	15,057	6–2–2	14
11	October 30	St. Louis Blues	2 – 4	Edmonton Oilers		Khabibulin	16,839	7–2–2	16

November: 5–8–1 (Home: 1–2–1; Road: 4–6–0)
#	Date	Visitor	Score	Home	OT	Decision	Attendance	Record	Pts	Recap
12	November 3	Edmonton Oilers	3 – 0	Los Angeles Kings		Khabibulin	18,118	8–2–2	18
13	November 5	Edmonton Oilers	2 – 4	Phoenix Coyotes		Dubnyk	13,381	8–3–2	18
14	November 8	Edmonton Oilers	3 – 1	Montreal Canadiens		Khabibulin	21,273	9–3–2	20
15	November 10	Edmonton Oilers	3 – 6	Boston Bruins		Dubnyk	17,565	9–4–2	20
16	November 11	Edmonton Oilers	0 – 3	Detroit Red Wings		Khabibulin	20,066	9–5–2	20
17	November 13	Edmonton Oilers	3 – 6	Chicago Blackhawks		Khabibulin	21,110	9–6–2	20
18	November 17	Ottawa Senators	5 – 2	Edmonton Oilers		Khabibulin	16,839	9–7–2	20
19	November 19	Chicago Blackhawks	2 – 9	Edmonton Oilers		Khabibulin	16,839	10–7–2	22
20	November 21	Edmonton Oilers	1 – 4	Dallas Stars		Khabibulin	11,458	10–8–2	22
21	November 22	Edmonton Oilers	6 – 2	Nashville Predators		Dubnyk	16,838	11–8–2	24
22	November 25	Edmonton Oilers	5 – 2	Minnesota Wild		Khabibulin	18,092	12–8–2	26
23	November 26	Edmonton Oilers	2 – 5	Colorado Avalanche		Dubnyk	17,684	12–9–2	26
24	November 28	Nashville Predators	2 – 1	Edmonton Oilers		Khabibulin	16,839	12–10–2	26
25	November 30	Minnesota Wild	3 – 2	Edmonton Oilers	SO	Khabibulin	16,839	12–10–3	27

December: 3–9–0 (Home: 3–3–0; Road: 0–6–0)
#	Date	Visitor	Score	Home	OT	Decision	Attendance	Record	Pts	Recap
26	December 2	Columbus Blue Jackets	3 – 6	Edmonton Oilers		Dubnyk	16,839	13–10–3	29
27	December 3	Calgary Flames	5 – 3	Edmonton Oilers		Khabibulin	16,839	13–11–3	29
28	December 7	Carolina Hurricanes	5 – 3	Edmonton Oilers		Dubnyk	16,839	13–12–3	29
29	December 9	Colorado Avalanche	1 – 4	Edmonton Oilers		Khabibulin	16,839	14–12–3	31
30	December 10	Edmonton Oilers	0 – 3	Calgary Flames		Dubnyk	19,289	14–13–3	31
31	December 15	Edmonton Oilers	2 – 4	Phoenix Coyotes		Dubnyk	9,397	14–14–3	31
32	December 17	Edmonton Oilers	2 – 3	San Jose Sharks		Khabibulin	17,562	14–15–3	31
33	December 19	Detroit Red Wings	3 – 2	Edmonton Oilers		Khabibulin	16,839	14–16–3	31
34	December 22	Minnesota Wild	1 – 4	Edmonton Oilers		Khabibulin	16,839	15–16–3	33
35	December 26	Edmonton Oilers	3 – 5	Vancouver Canucks		Khabibulin	18,890	15–17–3	33
36	December 29	Edmonton Oilers	3 – 4	Minnesota Wild		Khabibulin	19,194	15–18–3	33
37	December 31	Edmonton Oilers	1 – 4	New York Islanders		Dubnyk	13,807	15–19–3	33

January: 4–7–2 (Home: 3–2–1; Road: 1–5–1)
#	Date	Visitor	Score	Home	OT	Decision	Attendance	Record	Pts	Recap
38	January 2	Edmonton Oilers	4 – 3	Chicago Blackhawks		Dubnyk	21,216	16–19–3	35
39	January 3	Edmonton Oilers	3 – 4	Buffalo Sabres		Khabibulin	18,690	16–20–3	35
40	January 5	Edmonton Oilers	3 – 4	St. Louis Blues		Dubnyk	18,428	16–21–3	35
41	January 7	Edmonton Oilers	1 – 4	Dallas Stars		Khabibulin	16,122	16–22–3	35
42	January 11	New Jersey Devils	2 – 1	Edmonton Oilers	OT	Khabibulin	16,839	16–22–4	36
43	January 13	Anaheim Ducks	5 – 0	Edmonton Oilers		Khabibulin	16,839	16–23–4	36
44	January 15	Los Angeles Kings	1 – 2	Edmonton Oilers	OT	Dubnyk	16,839	17–23–4	38
45	January 17	Edmonton Oilers	2 – 4	Columbus Blue Jackets		Dubnyk	13,814	17–24–4	38
46	January 19	Edmonton Oilers	0 – 1	St. Louis Blues		Khabibulin	17,432	17–25–4	38
47	January 21	Calgary Flames	6 – 2	Edmonton Oilers		Khabibulin	16,839	17–26–4	38
48	January 23	San Jose Sharks	1 – 2	Edmonton Oilers	SO	Dubnyk	16,839	18–26–4	40
49	January 24	Edmonton Oilers	2 – 3	Vancouver Canucks	SO	Dubnyk	18,890	18–26–5	41
50	January 31	Colorado Avalanche	2 – 3	Edmonton Oilers		Dubnyk	16,839	19–26–5	43

February: 6–6–1 (Home: 3–4–1; Road: 3–2–0)
#	Date	Visitor	Score	Home	OT	Decision	Attendance	Record	Pts	Recap
51	February 2	Chicago Blackhawks	4 – 8	Edmonton Oilers		Dubnyk	16,839	20–26–5	45
52	February 4	Detroit Red Wings	4 – 5	Edmonton Oilers	SO	Dubnyk	16,839	21–26–5	47
53	February 6	Edmonton Oilers	3 – 6	Toronto Maple Leafs		Dubnyk	19,581	21–27–5	47
54	February 8	Edmonton Oilers	2 – 4	Detroit Red Wings		Khabibulin	20,066	21–28–5	47
55	February 11	Edmonton Oilers	4 – 3	Ottawa Senators	OT	Khabibulin	20,085	22–28–5	49
56	February 15	Toronto Maple Leafs	4 – 3	Edmonton Oilers	OT	Khabibulin	16,839	22–28–6	50
57	February 17	Colorado Avalanche	3 – 1	Edmonton Oilers		Dubnyk	16,839	22–29–6	50
58	February 19	Vancouver Canucks	5 – 2	Edmonton Oilers		Dubnyk	16,839	22–30–6	50
59	February 21	Edmonton Oilers	6 – 1	Calgary Flames		Dubynk	19,289	23–30–6	52
60	February 23	Philadelphia Flyers	0 – 2	Edmonton Oilers		Dubnyk	16,839	24–30–6	54
61	February 25	Phoenix Coyotes	3 – 1	Edmonton Oilers		Dubnyk	16,839	24–31–6	54
62	February 27	Edmonton Oilers	5 – 3	Winnipeg Jets		Dubnyk	15,004	25–31–6	56
63	February 29	St. Louis Blues	5 – 2	Edmonton Oilers		Dubnyk	16,839	25–32–6	56

March: 6–6–3 (Home: 2–4–1; Road: 4–1–2)
#	Date	Visitor	Score	Home	OT	Decision	Attendance	Record	Pts	Recap
64	March 2	Dallas Stars	3 – 1	Edmonton Oilers		Khabibulin	16,839	25–33–6	56
65	March 5	Edmonton Oilers	2 – 4	Anaheim Ducks		Khabibulin	13,596	25–34–6	56
66	March 6	Edmonton Oilers	3 – 2	San Jose Sharks	SO	Dubnyk	17,562	26–34–6	58
67	March 8	Montreal Canadiens	5 – 2	Edmonton Oilers		Khabibulin	16,839	26–35–6	58
68	March 10	Edmonton Oilers	2 – 3	Colorado Avalanche	SO	Khabibulin	15,683	26–35–7	59
69	March 12	San Jose Sharks	3 – 2	Edmonton Oilers		Dubnyk	16,839	26–36–7	59
70	March 14	Columbus Blue Jackets	0 – 3	Edmonton Oilers		Dubnyk	16,839	27–36–7	61
71	March 16	Calgary Flames	1 – 3	Edmonton Oilers		Dubnyk	16,839	28–36–7	63
72	March 18	Phoenix Coyotes	3 – 2	Edmonton Oilers	SO	Dubnyk	16,839	28–36–8	64
73	March 20	Edmonton Oilers	6 – 3	Nashville Predators		Dubnyk	17,113	29–36–8	66
74	March 22	Edmonton Oilers	2 – 3	Tampa Bay Lightning	SO	Khabibulin	17,893	29–36–9	67
75	March 23	Edmonton Oilers	2 – 1	Florida Panthers	SO	Dubnyk	16,214	30–36–9	69
76	March 25	Edmonton Oilers	6 – 3	Columbus Blue Jackets		Dubnyk	12,295	31–36–9	71
77	March 28	Dallas Stars	3 – 1	Edmonton Oilers		Dubnyk	16,839	31–37–9	71
78	March 30	Los Angeles Kings	4 – 1	Edmonton Oilers		Khabibulin	16,839	31–38–9	71

April: 1–2–1 (Home: 0–0–1; Road: 1–2–0)
#	Date	Visitor	Score	Home	OT	Decision	Attendance	Record	Pts	Recap
79	April 1	Edmonton Oilers	2 – 1	Anaheim Ducks		Dubnyk	17,266	32–38–9	73
80	April 2	Edmonton Oilers	0 – 2	Los Angeles Kings		Dubnyk	18,118	32–39–9	73
81	April 5	Anaheim Ducks	3 – 2	Edmonton Oilers	OT	Dubnyk	16,839	32–39–10	74
82	April 7	Edmonton Oilers	0 – 3	Vancouver Canucks		Dubnyk	18,890	32–40–10	74

Legend: Win (2 points) Loss (0 points) Overtime/shootout loss (1 point)

Schedule

== Player statistics ==
=== Skaters ===
Note: GP = Games played; G = Goals; A = Assists; Pts = Points; +/− = Plus/minus; PIM = Penalty minutes

Regular season

Player	GP	G	A	Pts	+/−	PIM
Jordan Eberle	78	34	42	76	4	10
Taylor Hall	61	27	26	53	−3	36
Ryan Nugent-Hopkins	62	18	34	52	-2	16
Sam Gagner	75	18	29	47	5	36
Ryan Smyth	82	19	27	46	−5	82
Ales Hemsky	69	10	26	36	−13	43
Shawn Horcoff	81	13	21	34	−23	24
Ryan Jones	79	17	16	33	−7	42
Jeff Petry	73	2	23	25	−7	26
Corey Potter	62	4	17	21	−16	24
Ryan Whitney	51	3	17	20	-16	16
Tom Gilbert^{‡}	47	3	14	17	−4	12
Eric Belanger	78	4	12	16	−13	32
Ladislav Smid	78	5	10	15	4	44
Ben Eager	63	8	5	13	−1	107
Andy Sutton	52	3	7	10	5	80
Lennart Petrell	60	4	5	9	−10	45
Magnus Paajarvi	41	2	6	8	−7	4
Anton Lander	56	2	4	6	−8	12
Teemu Hartikainen	17	2	3	5	1	6
Nick Schultz	20	0	4	4	-2	10
Darcy Hordichuk	43	1	2	3	−3	64
Theo Peckham	54	1	2	3	0	80
Linus Omark	14	3	0	3	−5	8
Josh Green	7	1	1	2	−6	7
Cam Barker	25	2	0	2	0	23
Chris VandeVelde	5	1	0	1	2	2
Alex Plante	3	0	1	1	0	2
Colten Teubert	24	0	1	1	−5	25
Philippe Cornet	2	0	1	1	0	0
Ryan O'Marra^{‡}	7	0	1	1	0	4
Bryan Rodney	1	0	0	0	-1	0
Taylor Chorney	3	0	0	0	−1	0
Milan Kytnar	1	0	0	0	0	0

=== Goaltenders ===
Note: GP = Games played; TOI = Time on ice (minutes); W = Wins; L = Losses; OT = Overtime losses; GA = Goals against; GAA= Goals against average; SA= Shots against; SV= Saves; Sv% = Save percentage; SO= Shutouts

Regular season

Player	GP	TOI	W	L	OT	GA	GAA	SA	Sv%	SO	G	A	PIM
Devan Dubnyk	47	2653	20	20	3	118	2.67	1380	.914	2	0	1	0
Nikolai Khabibulin	40	2261	12	20	7	100	2.65	1114	.910	2	0	0	0
Yann Danis	1	32	0	0	0	2	3.75	12	.833	0	0	0	0

^{†}Denotes player spent time with another team before joining Oilers. Stats reflect time with Oilers only.
^{‡}Traded mid-season. Stats reflect time with Oilers only.

== Awards and records ==
=== Awards ===
Regular Season
Player	Award	Reached
Nikolai Khabibulin	NHL Second Star of the Week	October 31, 2011
Nikolai Khabibulin	NHL Third Star of the Month	October 2011
Ryan Nugent-Hopkins	NHL Rookie of the Month	October 2011
Ryan Nugent-Hopkins	NHL Rookie of the Month	November 2011
Sam Gagner	NHL First Star of the Week	February 6, 2012

=== Records ===
- 3: On October 15, 2011, Ryan Nugent-Hopkins set:

- NHL record for the earliest career hat trick for a first overall pick.
- Oilers record for the earliest career hat trick in fewest career games.

- 8: Tied Oilers record for most points in a single game by Sam Gagner on February 2, 2012.
- 11: A new Oilers record for most consecutive points by Sam Gagner on February 4, 2012.

=== Milestones ===
Regular Season
Player	Milestone	Reached
Anton Lander	1st NHL Game	October 9, 2011
Ryan Nugent-Hopkins	1st NHL Game; 1st NHL Goal; 1st NHL Point	October 9, 2011
Lennart Petrell	1st NHL Game	October 13, 2011
Ryan Nugent-Hopkins	1st NHL Hat-trick	October 15, 2011
Ryan Nugent-Hopkins	1st NHL Assist	October 17, 2011
Lennart Petrell	1st NHL Assist; 1st NHL Point	October 28, 2011
Colten Teubert	1st NHL Game	November 3, 2011
Lennart Petrell	1st NHL Goal	November 3, 2011
Anton Lander	1st NHL Assist; 1st NHL Point	November 3, 2011
Colton Teubert	1st NHL Assist; 1st NHL Point	November 5, 2011
Sam Gagner	300th NHL Game	November 10, 2011
Theo Peckham	300th NHL PIM	November 10, 2011
Shawn Horcoff	700th NHL Game	November 11, 2011
Anton Lander	1st NHL Goal	November 17, 2011
Taylor Hall	2nd NHL Hat-trick	November 19, 2011
Ales Hemsky	400th NHL Point	November 19, 2011
Tom Gilbert	100th NHL PIM	November 22, 2011
Ales Hemsky	500th NHL Game	November 22, 2011
Darcy Hordichuk	500th NHL Game	November 25, 2011
Ryan Jones	200th NHL Game	November 28, 2011
Magnus Paajarvi	100th NHL Game	November 28, 2011
Ryan Jones	1st NHL Hat-trick	December 2, 2011
Ryan Whitney	400th NHL Game	December 7, 2011
Ryan Jones	100th NHL PIM	December 10, 2011
Jordan Eberle	100th NHL Game	December 15, 2011
Ryan Smyth	1,100th NHL Game	December 15, 2011
Ladislav Smid	300th NHL PIM	December 26, 2011
Darcy Hordichuk	1,100th NHL PIM	December 29, 2011
Ben Eager	800th NHL PIM	December 31, 2011
Josh Green	200th NHL PIM	January 7, 2012
Milan Kytnar	1st NHL Game	January 11, 2012
Taylor Hall	100th NHL Game	January 13, 2012
Philippe Cornet	1st NHL Game; 1st NHL Assist; 1st NHL Point	January 31, 2012
Sam Gagner	200th NHL Point; 2nd NHL Hat-trick; 1st Four-Goal NHL Game	February 2, 2012
Ales Hemsky	300th NHL Assist	February 11, 2012
Jordan Eberle	100th NHL Point	February 21, 2012
Devan Dubnyk	1st NHL Assist; 1st NHL Point	February 27, 2012
Ryan Smyth	800th NHL Point	February 27, 2012
Ladislav Smid	400th NHL Game	March 12, 2012
Jeff Petry	100th NHL Game	March 18, 2012
Ales Hemsky	1st NHL Hat-trick	March 20, 2012
Chris VandeVelde	1st NHL Goal	March 25, 2012
Ryan Whitney	200th NHL Assist	April 1, 2012
Devan Dubnyk	100th NHL Game	April 5, 2012

== Transactions ==
The Oilers have been involved in the following transactions during the 2011–12 season.

=== Trades ===
Date	Details
June 26, 2011	To Los Angeles Kings Colin Fraser; 7th-round pick in 2012	To Edmonton Oilers Ryan Smyth
July 1, 2011	To Anaheim Ducks Kurtis Foster	To Edmonton Oilers Andy Sutton
July 12, 2011	To Anaheim Ducks Andrew Cogliano	To Edmonton Oilers 2nd-round pick in 2013
February 16, 2012	To Anaheim Ducks Ryan O'Marra	To Edmonton Oilers Bryan Rodney
February 27, 2012	To Minnesota Wild Tom Gilbert	To Edmonton Oilers Nick Schultz

=== Free agents signed ===
Date	Player	Former team	Term
June 15, 2011	Lennart Petrell	HIFK	1 year, $680,000 entry-level contract
	Antti Tyrvainen	Pelicans	2 years, $1.14 million entry-level contract
July 1, 2011	Cam Barker	Minnesota Wild	1 year, $2.25 million
July 1, 2011	Eric Belanger	Phoenix Coyotes	3 years, $5.25 million
July 1, 2011	Ben Eager	San Jose Sharks	3 years, $3.3 million
July 1, 2011	Darcy Hordichuk	Florida Panthers	1 year, $825,000
July 1, 2011	Corey Potter	Pittsburgh Penguins	1 year, $525,000
July 3, 2011	Josh Green	Anaheim Ducks	1 year, $575,000
July 4, 2011	Yann Danis	Amur Khabarovsk	1 year, $650,000
July 4, 2011	Ryan Keller	Binghamton Senators	1 year, $625,000

=== Free agents lost ===
Date	Player	New team	Term
April 25, 2011	Brad Moran	Vaxjo Lakers	2 years
May 3, 2011	Stephane Goulet	ETC Crimmitschau	
May 25, 2011	Liam Reddox	Vaxjo Lakers	1 year
July 1, 2011	Sheldon Souray	Dallas Stars	1 year, $1.65 million
July 1, 2011	Colin McDonald	Pittsburgh Penguins	1 year
July 1, 2011	Jim Vandermeer	San Jose Sharks	1 year, $1 million
July 2, 2011	Richard Petiot	Tampa Bay Lightning	1 year, $525,000
July 4, 2011	Alexandre Giroux	Columbus Blue Jackets	1 year, $825,000
July 5, 2011	Zack Stortini	Nashville Predators	1 year, $550,000
July 6, 2011	Jean-Francois Jacques	Anaheim Ducks	1 year, $650,000
July 12, 2011	Jeff Deslauriers	Anaheim Ducks	2 years, $1.225 million
July 12, 2011	Martin Gerber	Vaxjo Lakers	2 years
July 12, 2011	Steve MacIntyre	Pittsburgh Penguins	1 year, $600,000
September 13, 2011	Ben Ondrus	Krefeld Pinguine	
September 27, 2011	Bryan Pitton	Bakersfield Condors	
October 2, 2011	Matt Marquardt	Bakersfield Condors	
November 3, 2011	Gregory Stewart	South Carolina Stingrays	
May 15, 2012	Matt Nickerson	KooKoo	
May 24, 2012	Milan Kytnár	Slovan Bratislava	
June 27, 2012	Kevin Montgomery	Lillehammer IK	

=== Claimed via waivers ===
Player	Former team	Date claimed off waivers
Taylor Chorney	St. Louis Blues	November 10, 2011

=== Lost via waivers ===
Player	New team	Date claimed off waivers
Taylor Chorney	St. Louis Blues	October 11, 2011
Gilbert Brule	Phoenix Coyotes	January 10, 2012

=== Player signings ===
Player	Contract terms
Ryan Jones	2 years, $3 million
Ladislav Smid	2 years, $4.5 million
Ryan Nugent-Hopkins	3 years, $2.775 million entry-level contract
Theo Peckham	1 year, $1.075 million
Taylor Chorney	1 year, $735,000
Ryan O'Marra	1 year, $735,000
Ryan Martindale	3 years, $2.07 million entry-level contract
Corey Potter	2 years, $1.55 million contract extension
Andy Sutton	1 year, $1.5 million contract extension
Ales Hemsky	2 years, $10 million contract extension
Tyler Bunz	3 years, $1.855 million entry-level contract
Kristians Pelss	3 years, $1.705 million entry-level contract
Brandon Davidson	3 years, $1.84 million entry-level contract
Oscar Klefbom	3 years, $2.775 million entry-level contract

== Draft picks ==
Edmonton's picks at the 2011 NHL entry draft in Saint Paul, Minnesota.

Round	#	Player	Position	Nationality	College/Junior/Club team (League)
1	1	Ryan Nugent-Hopkins	(C)	Canada	Red Deer Rebels (WHL)
1	19 (from Los Angeles)	Oscar Klefbom	(D)	Sweden	Farjestad BK (Elitserien)
2	31	David Musil	(D)	Czech Republic	Vancouver Giants (WHL)
3	62	Samu Perhonen	(G)	Finland	JYP Jr. (Finland Jr.)
3	74 (from Calgary)	Travis Ewanyk	(LW)	Canada	Edmonton Oil Kings (WHL)
4	92	Dillon Simpson	(D)	Canada	University of North Dakota (WCHA)
4	114 (from Pittsburgh)	Tobias Rieder	(C)	Germany	Kitchener Rangers (OHL)
5	122	Martin Gernat	(D)	Slovakia	HC Kosice Jr. (Slovakia Jr.)
7	182	Frans Tuohimaa	(G)	Finland	Jokerit Jr. (Finland Jr.)

== See also ==
- 2011–12 NHL season
