= Northwest Division (NHL) =

National Hockey League division

- Formerly: Smythe Division
- Conference: Western Conference
- League: National Hockey League
- Sport: Ice hockey
- Founded: 1998
- Folded: 2013
- Replaced by: Central Division and Pacific Division
- No. of teams: 5
- Most titles: Vancouver Canucks (7)

The National Hockey League's Northwest Division was formed in 1998 as part of the Western Conference due to expansion. The teams in the Pacific Division were split up, with the Calgary Flames, Colorado Avalanche, Edmonton Oilers, and the Vancouver Canucks becoming the newly formed Northwest Division. The Minnesota Wild joined the division in 2000 as an expansion team. Like the Pacific Division, the Northwest Division is also a descendant of the former Smythe Division, as three of its Canadian teams played in that division from 1981 to 1993.

The Northwest Division existed for 14 seasons (not including the cancelled 2004–05 season) until 2013. During that time, it had the greatest distances between teams in the entire NHL.

== Division lineups ==
=== 1998–2000 ===
1998-2000 Northwest Division Teams
- Calgary Flames
- Colorado Avalanche
- Edmonton Oilers
- Vancouver Canucks

==== Changes from the 1997–98 season ====
- The Northwest Division is formed as a result of NHL realignment
- The Calgary Flames, Colorado Avalanche, Edmonton Oilers and Vancouver Canucks come from the Pacific Division

=== 2000–2013 ===
2000-2013 Northwest Division Teams
- Calgary Flames
- Colorado Avalanche
- Edmonton Oilers
- Minnesota Wild
- Vancouver Canucks

==== Changes from the 1999–2000 season ====
- The Minnesota Wild are added as an expansion team

=== After the 2012–13 season ===
The Northwest Division was dissolved as the league realigned into two conferences with two divisions each. The division's Canadian teams (the Calgary Flames, Edmonton Oilers, and Vancouver Canucks) returned to the Pacific Division, while the division's American teams (the Colorado Avalanche and Minnesota Wild) joined the Central Division.

== Season results ==
^{(#)}	Denotes team that won the Stanley Cup
^{(#)}	Denotes team that won the Clarence S. Campbell Bowl, but lost Stanley Cup Final
^{(#)}	Denotes team that qualified for the Stanley Cup playoffs
‡	Denotes winner of the Presidents' Trophy

Season	1st	2nd	3rd	4th	5th
1998–99	^{(2)} Colorado (98)	^{(8)} Edmonton (78)	Calgary (72)	Vancouver (58)	
1999–2000	^{(3)} Colorado (96)	^{(7)} Edmonton (88)	Vancouver (83)	Calgary (77)	
2000–01	^{(1)} Colorado (118)^{‡}	^{(6)} Edmonton (93)	^{(8)} Vancouver (90)	Calgary (73)	Minnesota (68)
2001–02	^{(2)} Colorado (99)	^{(8)} Vancouver (94)	Edmonton (92)	Calgary (79)	Minnesota (73)
2002–03	^{(3)} Colorado (105)	^{(4)} Vancouver (104)	^{(6)} Minnesota (95)	^{(8)} Edmonton (92)	Calgary (75)
2003–04	^{(3)} Vancouver (101)	^{(4)} Colorado (100)	^{(6)} Calgary (94)	Edmonton (89)	Minnesota (83)
2004–05	No season due to 2004–05 NHL lockout				
2005–06	^{(3)} Calgary (103)	^{(7)} Colorado (95)	^{(8)} Edmonton (95)	Vancouver (92)	Minnesota (84)
2006–07	^{(3)} Vancouver (105)	^{(7)} Minnesota (104)	^{(8)} Calgary (96)	Colorado (95)	Edmonton (71)
2007–08	^{(3)} Minnesota (98)	^{(6)} Colorado (95)	^{(7)} Calgary (94)	Edmonton (88)	Vancouver (88)
2008–09	^{(3)} Vancouver (100)	^{(5)} Calgary (98)	Minnesota (89)	Edmonton (85)	Colorado (69)
2009–10	^{(3)} Vancouver (103)	^{(8)} Colorado (95)	Calgary (90)	Minnesota (84)	Edmonton (62)
2010–11	^{(1)} Vancouver (117)^{‡}	Calgary (94)	Minnesota (86)	Colorado (68)	Edmonton (62)
2011–12	^{(1)} Vancouver (111)^{‡}	Calgary (90)	Colorado (88)	Minnesota (81)	Edmonton (74)
2012–13^{[a]}	^{(3)} Vancouver (59)	^{(8)} Minnesota (55)	Edmonton (45)	Calgary (42)	Colorado (39)

Notes

- ^{a} The 2012–13 NHL season was shortened to 48 games due to the lockout.

== Northwest Division titles won by team ==
Team	Wins	Last win
Vancouver Canucks	7	2013
Colorado Avalanche	5	2003
Calgary Flames	1	2006
Minnesota Wild	1	2008
Edmonton Oilers	0	—
