= 2011–12 Columbus Blue Jackets season =

National Hockey League season

2011–12 Columbus Blue Jackets
- Division: 5th Central
- Conference: 15th Western
- 2011–12 record: 29–46–7
- Home record: 17–21–3
- Road record: 12–25–4
- Goals for: 202
- Goals against: 262

Team information
- General manager: Scott Howson
- Coach: Scott Arniel (Oct.–Jan.); Todd Richards (interim, Jan.–Apr.)
- Captain: Rick Nash
- Alternate captains: Jeff Carter (Oct.–Feb.); Derek Dorsett (Feb.–Mar.); Vaclav Prospal (Feb.–Apr.); R. J. Umberger; Antoine Vermette (Oct.–Feb.); James Wisniewski (Oct.–Mar.)
- Arena: Nationwide Arena
- Average attendance: 14,660 (80.8%)

Team leaders
- Goals: Rick Nash (30)
- Assists: Vaclav Prospal (39)
- Points: Rick Nash (59)
- Penalty minutes: Derek Dorsett (235)
- Plus/minus: Derek MacKenzie (+4)
- Wins: Steve Mason (16)
- Goals against average: Curtis Sanford (2.60)

The 2011–12 Columbus Blue Jackets season was the team's 12th season in the National Hockey League (NHL). The Blue Jackets' record of 29–46–7^{[note 1]} was the worst record in the NHL for 2011–12 and the first time in franchise history they finished in last place in the NHL. It also marked the third straight year that they missed the playoffs for the first time since the 2005–06 season and the 2007–08 season. Consequently, they had the best chance to receive the first overall selection in the 2012 NHL entry draft lottery, but lost out to the Edmonton Oilers and received the second pick instead.

The Blue Jackets began the year with the worst start in franchise history and the worst by any team in an NHL season in 19 years. After an 11–25–5 start, head coach Scott Arniel was fired and replaced by assistant coach Todd Richards. The poor season prompted several personnel changes, including the trade of All-Star forward Jeff Carter, who was acquired with much fanfare during the off-season. With the prospect of another rebuild looming the Blue Jackets' captain and best player, Rick Nash, requested to be traded, though he would remain with the team for the entire season.

The team was involved in a controversial loss to the Los Angeles Kings, when the Staples Center clock appeared to freeze at 1.8 seconds allowing the Kings time to score the winning goal. During the season Columbus managed only two winning streaks of three or more games. One of which came towards the end of the year helping the Blue Jackets finish with 65 points, the third worst point total in franchise history.

== Off-season ==
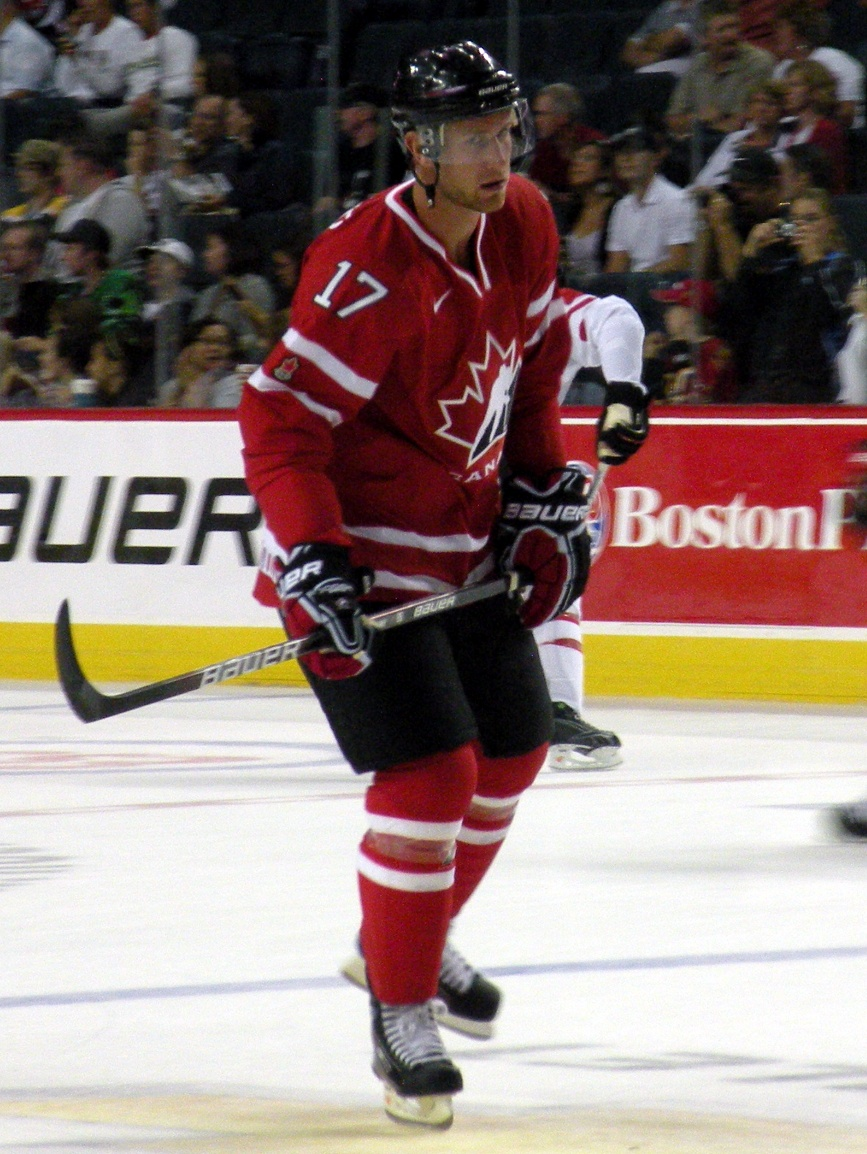
The acquisition of Jeff Carter was one of Columbus' big moves in the off-season

In the off-season, the Blue Jackets' approach to building their team changed, moving from a team of young developing players into one with established players. The first deal General Manager Scott Howson made was the acquisition of All-Star forward Jeff Carter on June 23, 2011. The deal sent Jakub Voracek, Columbus' first-round draft choice, the eighth overall, and their third-round pick in the 2011 draft to the Philadelphia Flyers in exchange for Carter. The trade received a positive response in Columbus from fans and management who felt they finally had a number one center to play alongside of their best player, Rick Nash. Next, they traded for the negotiating rights of soon to be free agent James Wisniewski. Wisniewski scored a career-high 51 points during the 2010–11 season, splitting time between the New York Islanders and Montreal Canadiens. The point total was fifth-highest in the league for defenseman scoring, tying Tobias Enstrom. The Blue Jackets came to terms with Wisniewski just one hour prior to the start of free agency, signing him to a six-year, $33 million contract.

Columbus also traded former first round draft pick Nikita Filatov to the Ottawa Senators for a third-round pick in the 2011 draft. Filatov had failed to live up to expectations in Columbus, playing in only 44 games over three seasons scoring six goals. Prior to the start of the season, the Blue Jackets were questioned for not signing a veteran back-up to starting goaltender Steve Mason, as the former Calder Memorial Trophy winner had struggled in consecutive seasons. The Blue Jackets signed Mark Dekanich as the back-up who had only 50 minutes of NHL experience prior to the start of the season. Columbus did sign a veteran Curtis Sanford to be their third string goaltender and to start for their American Hockey League (AHL) affiliate, the Springfield Falcons. Sanford had not played in the NHL since 2009. During training camp, Dekanich suffered a high ankle sprain that was expected to keep him out of the line-up for a month. Additionally, Sanford suffered a groin injury, leaving Allen York as the back-up. York had only played four professional games, all in the AHL, entering the season.

== Regular season ==
=== October – December ===
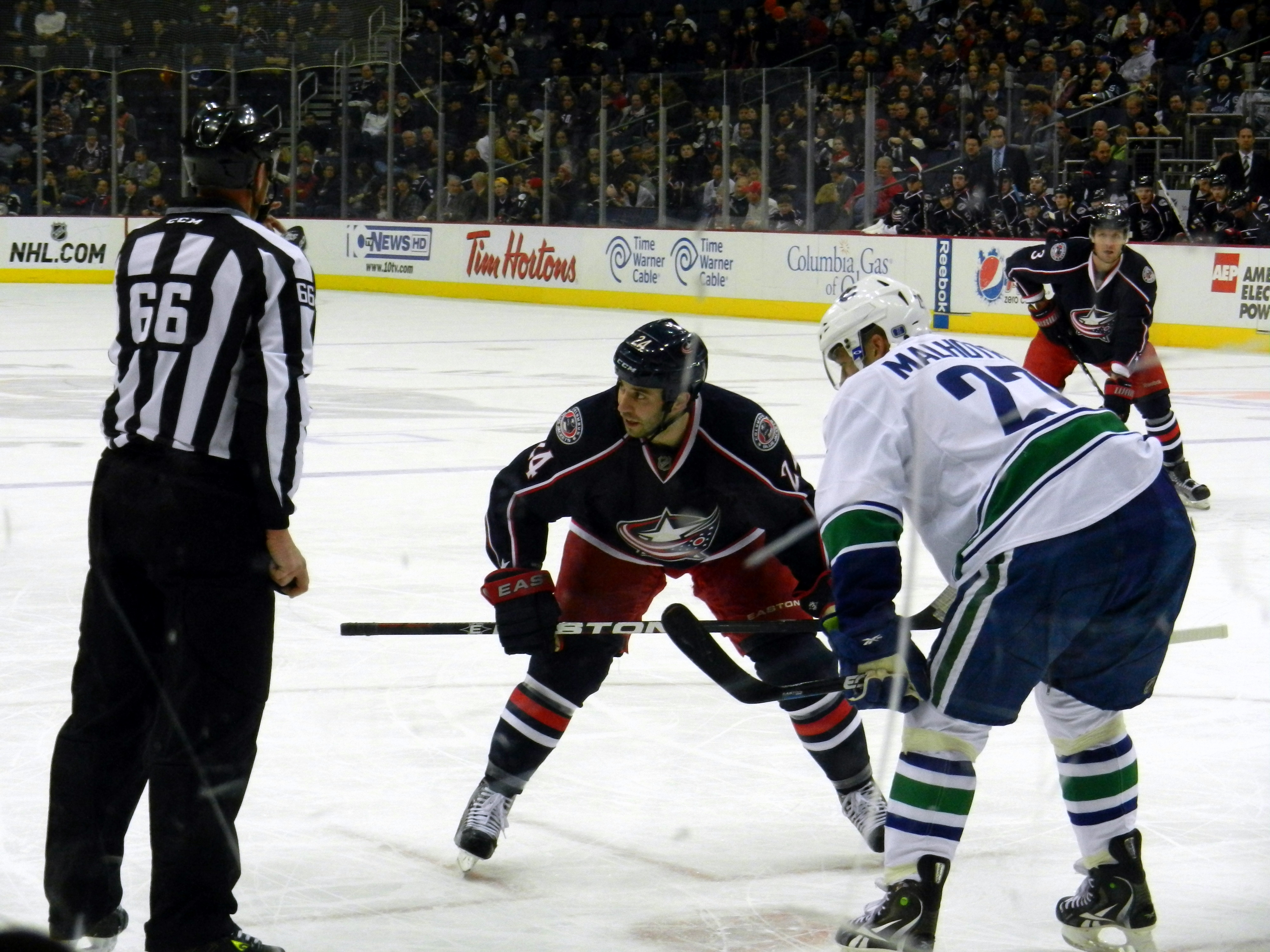
Derek MacKenzie takes a face-off against the Vancouver Canucks' Manny Malhotra during the December 13 game

After the first five games, all losses, Jeff Carter suffered a broken foot that kept him out of the line-up for 10 games. While Carter was injured, the Blue Jackets continued to lose games. In the eighth game of the year, they had a chance to end the losing streak against the Ottawa Senators. Columbus held a 3–2 lead with under a minute to play. Jason Spezza tied the game on a late power play, and with just 4.7 seconds remaining, Milan Michalek notched the winning goal for the Senators. The loss helped set a franchise record for futility with a 0–7–1 record to start a season.^{[note 1]} The losing streak came to an end three days later with a win over the Detroit Red Wings. During the game, several milestones were reached. James Wisniewski made his Columbus debut, Ryan Johansen and John Moore scored their first career NHL goals and Grant Clitsome had a career-high three assists. Columbus was unable to create any momentum from the win, however, and continued to struggle, culminating in a 2–12–1 record, which was the worst start to an NHL season for any team in 19 years. With the team struggling, management attempted to "shake things up" by making some roster moves. The first move was the acquisition of center Mark Letestu from the Pittsburgh Penguins. Next, they traded defenseman Kris Russell to the St. Louis Blues for Nikita Nikitin. As the clubs slow start continued, there were rumors that Head Coach Scott Arniel would be fired and replaced with Ken Hitchcock. Hitchcock had previously coached the Blue Jackets to their only playoff appearance in club history and was still under contract with the franchise through to the end of the season. Before any of these rumors came to fruition, the St. Louis Blues asked Columbus for permission to hire Hitchcock, which the Blue Jackets allowed. Hitchcock began his Blues coaching career with a 6–1–2 record in his first nine games, while Columbus amassed a 6–13–3 record to start the season.

During the same time frame as the Hitchcock rumors, goaltender Curtis Sanford returned from his groin injury on November 13. He made his first start of the season against the Boston Bruins, losing 2–1 in a shootout. Sanford continued his strong play, posting a 3–1–2 record, 1.38 goals against average and .947 save percentage over his next six games. Sanford started 12 consecutive games before Steve Mason made his next start. The number of starts might not have been as numerous, but prior to the November 23 game, Mason was hit in the head by a shot from Rick Nash during pre-game warm-ups and suffered a concussion. Mason returned from his concussion after two games, making a start against the Vancouver Canucks. Mason allowed only one goal in the game despite suffering from cramping in the third period, temporarily being replaced by Sanford for just over three minutes. Columbus won the game 2–1 in a shootout, breaking a nine-game losing streak to the Canucks. After the game, Arniel stated that Sanford was still seen as the team's number one goaltender. However, Mason started four of the next six games with the Blue Jackets going 0–5–1 during that stretch.

=== January – February ===
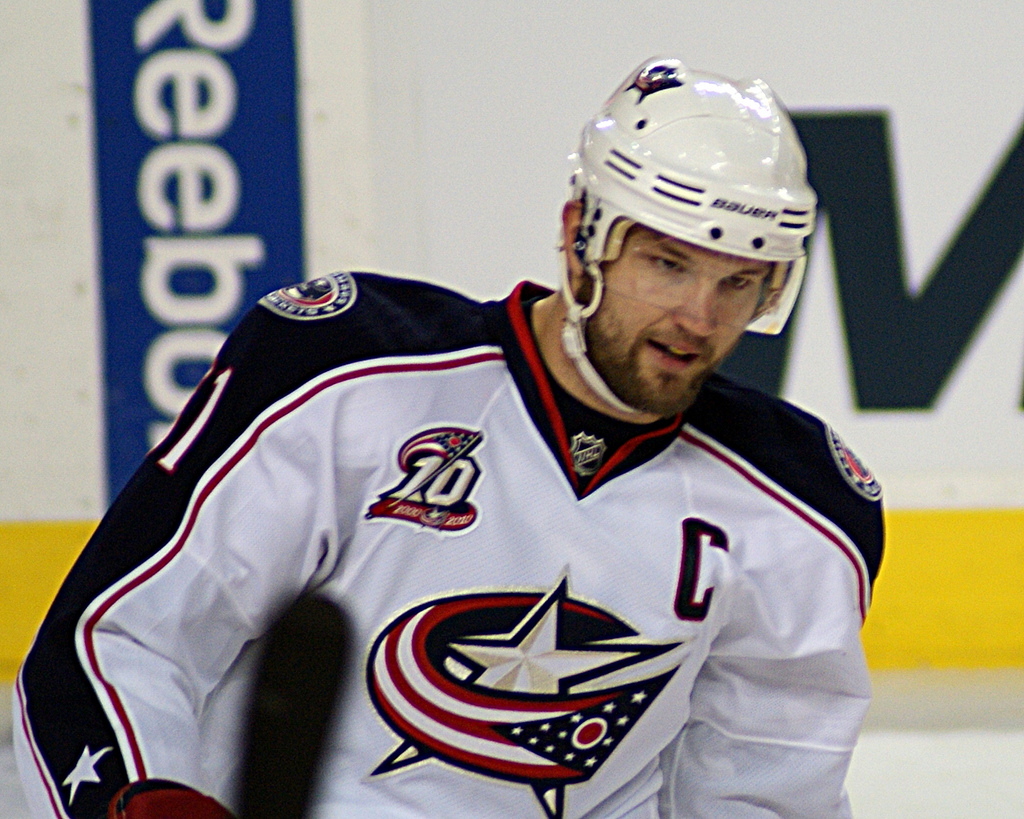
Trade rumors surrounded Rick Nash during the season

With the losing continuing, more rumors began to surface. Unlike before, the rumors were about player moves rather than coaching changes. The majority of rumors were that the Blue Jackets would trade Rick Nash. While Howson stated that he had never brought up trading Nash in discussions, other teams had inquired about his availability. Nash stated that if Columbus felt it would make the franchise better than he would be willing to waive his no-trade clause. Howson publicly stated that he had no intention of trading Nash. More rumors came to light when reports attributed to Réseau des sports stated that Carter was unhappy in Columbus and demanded a trade. Howson, Carter and his agent all denied that a trade request was ever made, and they were unsure where the reports were coming from. With the trade deadline approaching, speculation picked up on the Blue Jackets trading Carter. Reports were that Columbus was trying to trade Carter and that he was "100 percent available."

At the halfway point of the season, the Blue Jackets with an 11–25–5 record, worst in the league, and sitting 20 points out of playoff position, Columbus fired Arniel. He was replaced by Assistant Coach Todd Richards on an interim basis. Richards had previously coached the Minnesota Wild. He recorded his first coaching victory for the Blue Jackets in his second game, a 4–3 win over the Phoenix Coyotes. The change in coaching did not change the fortunes of the team, as they reached the All-Star break with a 13–30–6 record. At the break, Blue Jackets' owner John P. McConnell sent out a letter to fans stating his understanding of their frustration. He added that action would be taken around the trade deadline, the entry draft and free agency to take the team in a new direction. When speaking of the season, McConnell stated "disappointing is not a strong enough word" and that he was committed to giving fans a team of which they can be proud of. He also thanked them for their dedication and passion, while reiterating that the team goal was to "win consistently and compete for the Stanley Cup." Days later, a 250-person protest occurred outside of Nationwide Arena. Fans were upset with the Blue Jackets' management and were calling for changes at the top. The same day the fans protested, it was announced that the franchise would host the 2013 All-Star Game. Columbus was without a representative for the 2012 All-star Game, but Ryan Johansen represented the club as a rookie participant in the Super Skills Competition. In the competition, Johansen participated in the Allstate Insurance NHL Breakaway Challenge, a shootout themed event judged by the fans. He received just 1% of the vote and finished last.

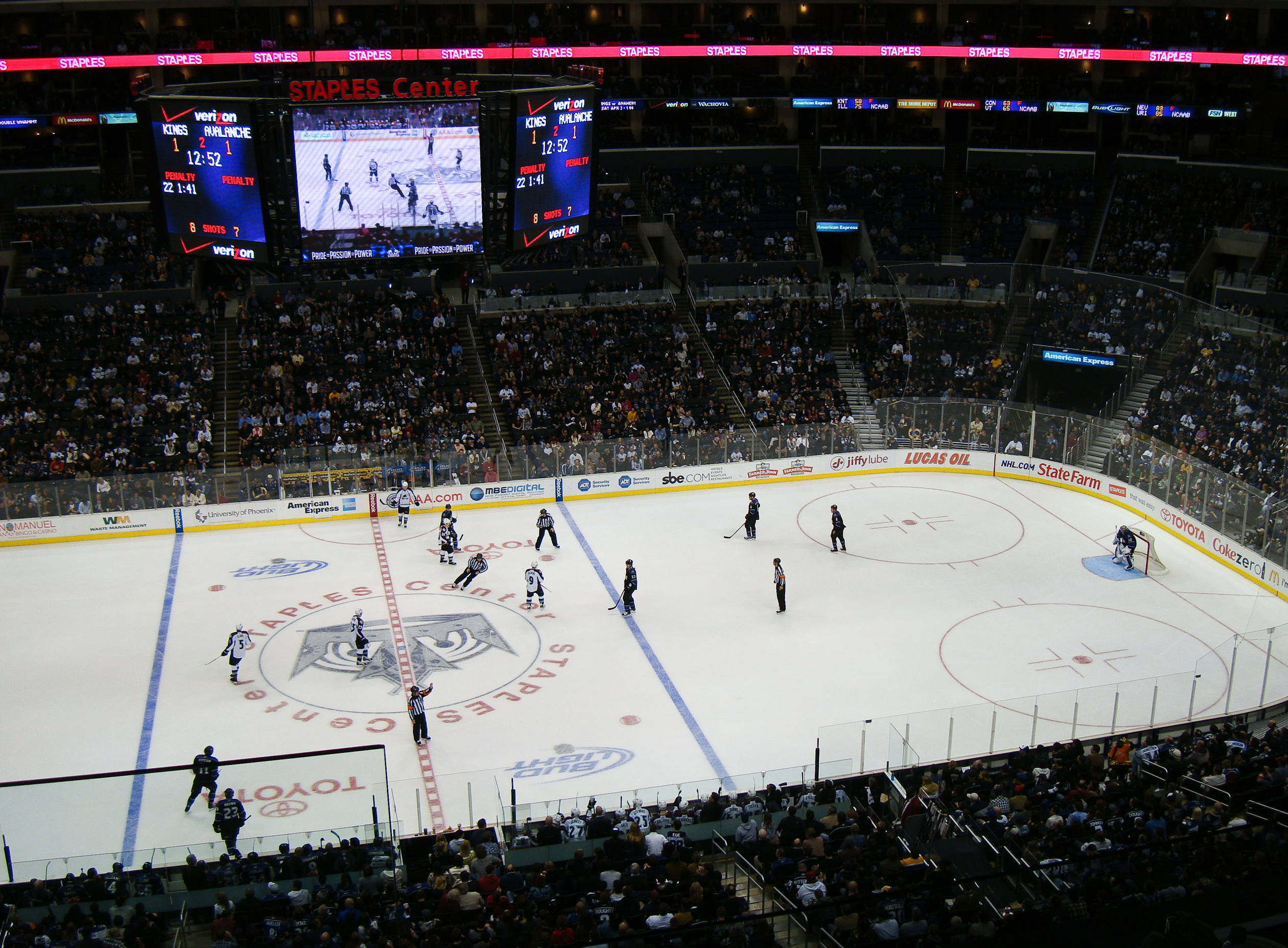
The Staples Center clock (score board shown) appeared to freeze costing the Blue Jackets a standings point

Following the break, the Blue Jackets were on the road playing the Los Angeles Kings, and with the score tied late in the game, Kings' defenseman Drew Doughty scored with just 0.4 seconds remaining to win the game. Upon review of the goal it, was determined that the clock at Staples Center froze at 1.8 seconds for over a full second, which would have resulted in time expiring prior to the goal being scored. Kings' General Manager Dean Lombardi stated that the clock was correct and no extra time had been added due to the way the clock self-corrects at various times. Howson stated on the team's blog that "It is an amazing coincidence that with the Kings on a power play at Staples Center and with a mad scramble around our net in the dying seconds of the third period of a 2–2 hockey game that the clock stopped for at least one full second," adding that, "Either there was a deliberate stopping of the clock or the clock malfunctioned." NHL Senior Vice President of Hockey Operations Colin Campbell stated that the Blue Jackets were wronged, but that the outcome of the game could not be changed, and that the delay was not noticed by the off-ice officials or the situation room in Toronto. To determine the true cause of the clock pause, the NHL launched an investigation, talking with the clock's manufacturer and interviewing Staples Center staff.

Two weeks prior to the NHL trade deadline, Columbus announced that unlike earlier in the season, they would listen to trade proposals involving Rick Nash, though they were not actively shopping him. Howson stated that the team was open to all options for improving the team, including trading Nash. Speculation was that in return for Nash the Blue Jackets would ask for a "combination of young, proven players, high-end prospects and draft picks." Leading up to the trade deadline, the Blue Jackets dealt Antoine Vermette to the Phoenix Coyotes for two draft picks and goaltender Curtis McElhinney. Despite being injured at the time, the acquisition of McElhinney was believed to give Columbus the flexibility to trade Curtis Sanford. The following day, on February 23, Columbus traded Jeff Carter to the Kings. In the deal, Columbus acquired defenseman Jack Johnson and a first-round draft pick; the team was given the choice of taking the pick in either 2012 or 2013. At the deadline, Columbus was unable to come to terms on a deal involving Nash, but they did make one more move; they sent center Samuel Pahlsson to the Vancouver Canucks in exchange for two fourth-round draft picks and minor league defenseman Taylor Ellington. Following the trade deadline, Howson announced that the team had attempted to trade Nash at the player's request. Nash stated that he had requested the trade after being informed that the franchise was going into another rebuilding phase. He further noted that he felt that he "could be a huge part of that towards bringing assets in," and in his view "it was the best thing for the team, the organization, and personally for [his] career." After the personnel changes, the Blue Jackets closed out the month with a three-game losing streak.

=== March – April ===
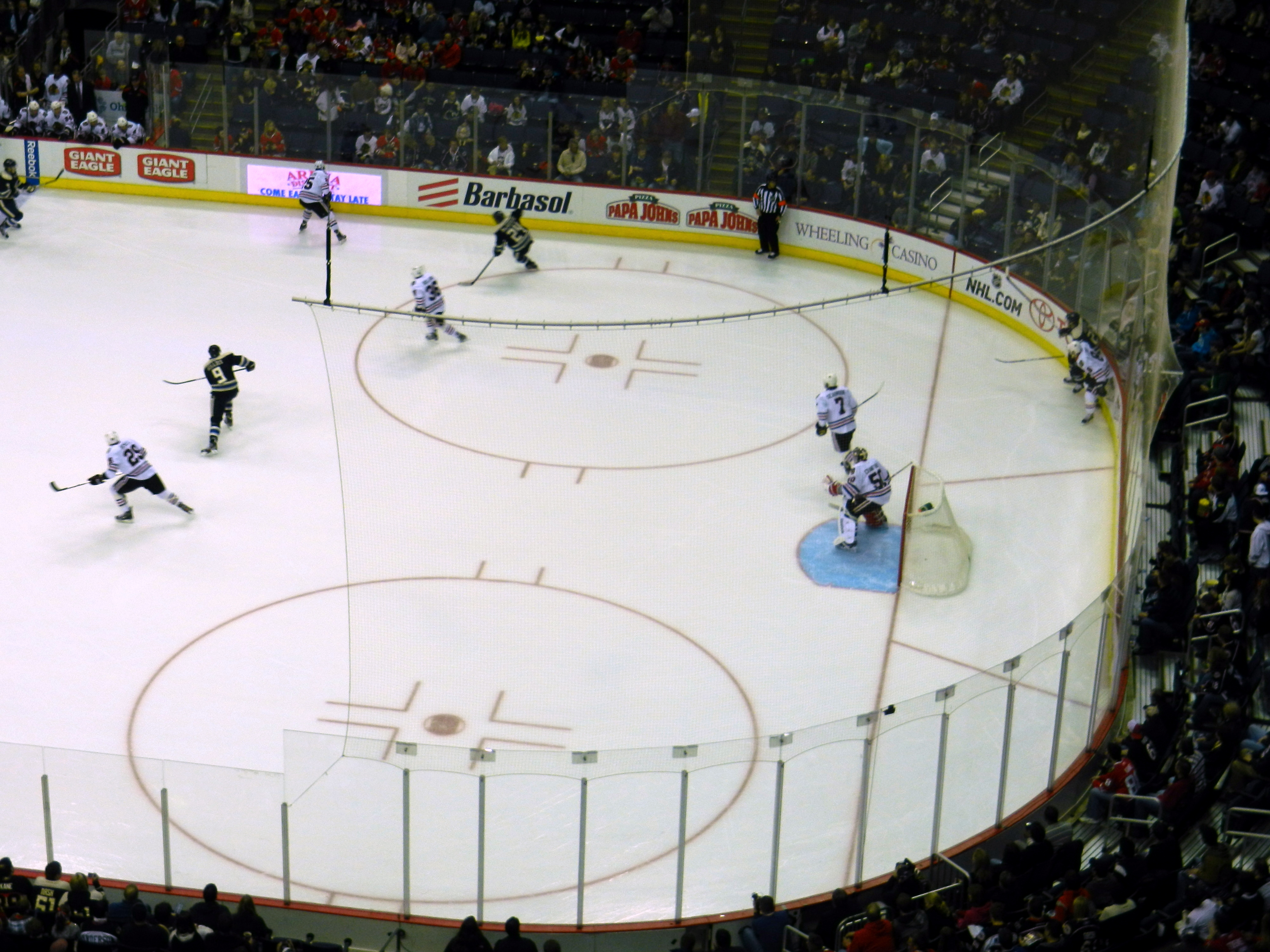
The Blue Jackets playing the Chicago Blackhawks at Nationwide Arena on February 18, 2012

Columbus started March with a 2–0 shutout against the Colorado Avalanche. They proceeded to win their next game against the Phoenix Coyotes 5–2, which marked the first time that the Blue Jackets posted back-to-back regulation victories during the season. Columbus again defeated the Coyotes three days later to earn their first three-game win streak of the season. They extended the streak to four with a win over the Los Angeles Kings before it came to an end with a 4–1 loss to the St. Louis Blues. It was the only four-game win streak of the season for the Blue Jackets. They immediately matched their four-game win streak with a four-game losing streak and with ten games remaining, the Blue Jackets were the first team eliminated from playoff contention. Shortly after being eliminated, they were defeated by the Edmonton Oilers 6–3; the loss clinched last place in the NHL for Columbus. It was the first time in franchise history the Blue Jackets finished in 30th place.

Three days later, on March 28, goaltender Steve Mason was injured in the morning skate when a shot from Colton Gillies hit him in the mask. With Sanford again injured, York made an emergency start. Playing against the Detroit Red Wings, York made 29 saves, including 17 in the third period, helping Columbus to a 4–2 victory and giving York his first career NHL win. York remained the starter and led the Blue Jackets to a second three-game winning streak. In his fourth start, Columbus was shut out by the Coyotes despite a franchise-record 54 shots on goal, losing 2–0. The 54 saves by Phoenix goaltender Mike Smith set an NHL record for a regulation shutout. Mason returned to the starter's role for the final two games, winning both. The two victories gave Columbus 65 points for the year, their third-lowest total in franchise history.

The Blue Jackets struggled in shorthanded situations, allowing the most power-play goals in the league, with 64, and having the lowest penalty-kill percentage, at 76.64%.

== Post-season ==
Finishing with the worst record in the NHL, Columbus had the best chance of receiving the first overall pick in the 2012 draft. With the NHL's weighted draft lottery the Blue Jackets had a 48.2% chance of drafting first overall. However, the lottery was won by the Edmonton Oilers, who proceeded to leapfrog Columbus and secure the number one draft pick for a third consecutive year. It was the fifth time that the Blue Jackets were dropped one draft position in the franchise's 12 lottery participations.

A month later, on May 14, the Blue Jackets announced that Richards would remain as head coach and signed him to a two-year contract. During the press conference, Howson noted, "Our team continuously improved under Todd and he has earned the opportunity to build upon the work he started." Columbus posted an 18–21–2 record under Richards, including winning seven of their final 11 games.

== Standings ==
Since being founded as an expansion team, the Blue Jackets have played in the Central Division of the Western Conference. Division rivals Chicago Blackhawks, Detroit Red Wings, Nashville Predators and St. Louis Blues, all made the playoff during the 2011–12 season, which helped Columbus finish 36 points behind fourth place Chicago and 44 points out of first.

Central Division
Pos	Team	GP	W	L	OTL	ROW	GF	GA	GD	Pts
1	y – St. Louis Blues	82	49	22	11	45	210	165	+45	109
2	x – Nashville Predators	82	48	26	8	43	237	210	+27	104
3	x – Detroit Red Wings	82	48	28	6	39	248	203	+45	102
4	x – Chicago Blackhawks	82	45	26	11	38	248	238	+10	101
5	Columbus Blue Jackets	82	29	46	7	25	202	262	−60	65

Source: National Hockey League
x – Clinched playoff spot; y – Clinched division

Western Conference
Pos	Div	Team	GP	W	L	OTL	ROW	GF	GA	GD	Pts
1	NW	p – Vancouver Canucks	82	51	22	9	43	249	198	+51	111
2	CE	y – St. Louis Blues	82	49	22	11	45	210	165	+45	109
3	PA	y – Phoenix Coyotes	82	42	27	13	36	216	204	+12	97
4	CE	x – Nashville Predators	82	48	26	8	43	237	210	+27	104
5	CE	x – Detroit Red Wings	82	48	28	6	39	248	203	+45	102
6	CE	x – Chicago Blackhawks	82	45	26	11	38	248	238	+10	101
7	PA	x – San Jose Sharks	82	43	29	10	34	228	210	+18	96
8	PA	x – Los Angeles Kings	82	40	27	15	34	194	179	+15	95
9	NW	Calgary Flames	82	37	29	16	34	202	226	−24	90
10	PA	Dallas Stars	82	42	35	5	35	211	222	−11	89
11	NW	Colorado Avalanche	82	41	35	6	32	208	220	−12	88
12	NW	Minnesota Wild	82	35	36	11	24	177	226	−49	81
13	PA	Anaheim Ducks	82	34	36	12	31	204	231	−27	80
14	NW	Edmonton Oilers	82	32	40	10	27	212	239	−27	74
15	CE	Columbus Blue Jackets	82	29	46	7	25	202	262	−60	65

Source: National Hockey League
p – Clinched Presidents' Trophy; x – Clinched playoff spot; y – Clinched division

== Schedule and results ==
=== Pre-season ===
2011 Pre-season game log: 5–2–1 (home: 4–0–0; road: 1–2–1)
#	Date	Visitor	Score	Home	OT	Decision	Record	Recap
1	September 20 (split-squad)	Winnipeg Jets	1–5	Columbus Blue Jackets		Dekanich	1–0–0	Recap
2	September 20 (split-squad)	Columbus Blue Jackets	1–6	Winnipeg Jets		Sanford	1–1–0	Recap
3	September 21	Washington Capitals	3–4	Columbus Blue Jackets	OT	Mason	2–1–0	Recap
4	September 23	Columbus Blue Jackets	3–4	Minnesota Wild	OT	York	2–1–1	Recap
5	September 25	Buffalo Sabres	1–4	Columbus Blue Jackets		Mason	3–1–1	Recap
6	September 26	Columbus Blue Jackets	1–3	Washington Capitals		Sanford	3–2–1	Recap
7	September 29	Minnesota Wild	2–4	Columbus Blue Jackets		Mason	4–2–1	Recap
8	September 30	Columbus Blue Jackets	3–2	Carolina Hurricanes		Mason	5–2–1	Recap

=== Regular season ===
- Green background indicates win (2 points).
- Red background indicates regulation loss (0 points).
- Silver background indicates overtime/shootout loss (1 point).

2011–12 game log

October: 2–9–1 (home: 2–3–1; road: 0–6–0)
#	Date	Visitor	Score	Home	OT	Decision	Attendance	Record	Pts	Recap
1	October 7	Nashville Predators	3–2	Columbus Blue Jackets	–	Mason	18,247	0–1–0	0	Recap
2	October 8	Columbus Blue Jackets	2–4	Minnesota Wild	–	Mason	19,040	0–2–0	0	Recap
3	October 10	Vancouver Canucks	3–2	Columbus Blue Jackets	–	Mason	9,187	0–3–0	0	Recap
4	October 12	Colorado Avalanche	3–2	Columbus Blue Jackets	SO	Mason	8,986	0–3–1	1	Recap
5	October 15	Columbus Blue Jackets	2–4	Dallas Stars	–	Mason	8,305	0–4–1	1	Recap
6	October 18	Dallas Stars	3–2	Columbus Blue Jackets	–	Mason	9,158	0–5–1	1	Recap
7	October 21	Columbus Blue Jackets	2–5	Detroit Red Wings	–	Mason	20,066	0–6–1	1	Recap
8	October 22	Columbus Blue Jackets	3–4	Ottawa Senators	–	Mason	18,867	0–7–1	1	Recap
9	October 25	Detroit Red Wings	1–4	Columbus Blue Jackets	–	Mason	15,100	1–7–1	3	Recap
10	October 27	Columbus Blue Jackets	2–4	Buffalo Sabres	–	Mason	18,690	1–8–1	3	Recap
11	October 29	Columbus Blue Jackets	2–5	Chicago Blackhawks	–	York	21,114	1–9–1	3	Recap
12	October 30	Anaheim Ducks	1–3	Columbus Blue Jackets	–	Mason	16,022	2–9–1	5	Recap

November: 4–4–2 (home: 3–3–0; road: 1–1–2)
#	Date	Visitor	Score	Home	OT	Decision	Attendance	Record	Pts	Recap
13	November 3	Toronto Maple Leafs	4–1	Columbus Blue Jackets	–	Mason	14,306	2–10–1	5	Recap
14	November 5	Columbus Blue Jackets	2–9	Philadelphia Flyers	–	York	19,784	2–11–1	5	Recap
15	November 10	Chicago Blackhawks	6–3	Columbus Blue Jackets	–	Mason	15,048	2–12–1	5	Recap
16	November 12	Winnipeg Jets	1–2	Columbus Blue Jackets	–	Mason	15,581	3–12–1	7	Recap
17	November 15	Minnesota Wild	4–2	Columbus Blue Jackets	–	Mason	10,833	3–13–1	7	Recap
18	November 17	Columbus Blue Jackets	1–2	Boston Bruins	SO	Sanford	17,565	3–13–2	8	Recap
19	November 19	Columbus Blue Jackets	4–3	Nashville Predators	OT	Sanford	16,776	4–13–2	10	Recap
20	November 21	Calgary Flames	1–4	Columbus Blue Jackets	–	Sanford	11,629	5–13–2	12	Recap
21	November 23	Columbus Blue Jackets	1–2	New Jersey Devils	SO	Sanford	15,585	5–13–3	13	Recap
22	November 25	Buffalo Sabres	1–5	Columbus Blue Jackets	–	Sanford	16,705	6–13–3	15	Recap
23	November 27	St. Louis Blues	2–1	Columbus Blue Jackets	–	Sanford	14,151	6–14–3	15	Recap
24	November 29	Columbus Blue Jackets	1–4	Vancouver Canucks	–	Sanford	18,890	6–15–3	15	Recap

December: 4–8–2 (home: 1–4–2; road: 3–4–0)
#	Date	Visitor	Score	Home	OT	Decision	Attendance	Record	Pts	Recap
25	December 1	Columbus Blue Jackets	4–3	Calgary Flames	SO	Sanford	19,289	7–15–3	17	Recap
26	December 2	Columbus Blue Jackets	3–6	Edmonton Oilers	–	Sanford	16,839	7–16–3	17	Recap
27	December 6	Columbus Blue Jackets	3–2	Montreal Canadiens	SO	Sanford	21,273	8–16–3	19	Recap
28	December 8	Nashville Predators	4–3	Columbus Blue Jackets	OT	Sanford	13,852	8–16–4	20	Recap
29	December 10	Boston Bruins	5–3	Columbus Blue Jackets	–	Sanford	18,175	8–17–4	20	Recap
30	December 13	Vancouver Canucks	1–2	Columbus Blue Jackets	SO	Mason	15,808	9–17–4	22	Recap
31	December 15	Los Angeles Kings	2–1	Columbus Blue Jackets	–	Sanford	16,090	9–18–4	22	Recap
32	December 17	Tampa Bay Lightning	3–2	Columbus Blue Jackets	–	Mason	16,108	9–19–4	22	Recap
33	December 18	Columbus Blue Jackets	4–6	St. Louis Blues	–	Mason	18,611	9–20–4	22	Recap
34	December 22	Columbus Blue Jackets	4–6	Nashville Predators	–	Sanford	17,113	9–21–4	22	Recap
35	December 26	Columbus Blue Jackets	1–4	Chicago Blackhawks	–	Mason	21,645	9–22–4	22	Recap
36	December 27	Calgary Flames	2–1	Columbus Blue Jackets	SO	Mason	16,985	9–22–5	23	Recap
37	December 29	Columbus Blue Jackets	4–1	Dallas Stars	–	Mason	16,555	10–22–5	25	Recap
38	December 31	Washington Capitals	4–2	Columbus Blue Jackets	–	Mason	18,199	10–23–5	25	Recap

January: 3–8–1 (home: 2–2–0; road: 1–6–1)
#	Date	Visitor	Score	Home	OT	Decision	Attendance	Record	Pts	Recap
39	January 5	Columbus Blue Jackets	1–2	San Jose Sharks	–	Sanford	17,562	10–24–5	25	Recap
40	January 7	Columbus Blue Jackets	1–0	Los Angeles Kings	–	Sanford	18,118	11–24–5	27	Recap
41	January 8	Columbus Blue Jackets	4–7	Anaheim Ducks	–	Sanford	13,053	11–25–5	27	Recap
42	January 10	Columbus Blue Jackets	2–5	Chicago Blackhawks	–	Sanford	21,229	11–26–5	27	Recap
43	January 13	Phoenix Coyotes	3–4	Columbus Blue Jackets	–	Sanford	14,119	12–26–5	29	Recap
44	January 14	San Jose Sharks	2–1	Columbus Blue Jackets	–	Sanford	16,582	12–27–5	29	Recap
45	January 17	Edmonton Oilers	2–4	Columbus Blue Jackets	–	Sanford	13,814	13–27–5	31	Recap
46	January 19	Nashville Predators	3–0	Columbus Blue Jackets	–	Mason	17,233	13–28–5	31	Recap
47	January 21	Columbus Blue Jackets	2–3	Detroit Red Wings	SO	Sanford	20,066	13–28–6	32	Recap
48	January 23	Columbus Blue Jackets	1–4	Nashville Predators	–	Sanford	14,310	13–29–6	32	Recap
49	January 24	Columbus Blue Jackets	2–4	Tampa Bay Lightning	–	Sanford	16,859	13–30–6	32	Recap
50	January 31	Columbus Blue Jackets	0–6	San Jose Sharks	–	Mason	17,562	13–31–6	32	Recap

February: 5–7–1 (home: 3–5–0; road: 2–2–1)
#	Date	Visitor	Score	Home	OT	Decision	Attendance	Record	Pts	Recap
51	February 1	Columbus Blue Jackets	2–3	Los Angeles Kings	–	Sanford	18,118	13–32–6	32	Recap
52	February 3	Columbus Blue Jackets	3–2	Anaheim Ducks	OT	Sanford	13,358	14–32–6	34	Recap
53	February 7	Minnesota Wild	1–3	Columbus Blue Jackets	–	Sanford	11,237	15–32–6	36	Recap
54	February 9	Dallas Stars	4–2	Columbus Blue Jackets	–	Sanford	15,943	15–33–6	36	Recap
55	February 11	Columbus Blue Jackets	3–1	Minnesota Wild	–	Mason	18,958	16–33–6	38	Recap
56	February 12	Anaheim Ducks	5–3	Columbus Blue Jackets	–	Mason	14,033	16–34–6	38	Recap
57	February 14	St. Louis Blues	1–2	Columbus Blue Jackets	–	Mason	12,429	17–34–6	40	Recap
58	February 18	Chicago Blackhawks	6–1	Columbus Blue Jackets	–	Mason	18,663	17–35–6	40	Recap
59	February 19	Columbus Blue Jackets	2–3	New York Rangers	OT	Mason	18,200	17–35–7	41	Recap
60	February 21	San Jose Sharks	3–6	Columbus Blue Jackets	–	Mason	14,625	18–35–7	43	Recap
61	February 24	Colorado Avalanche	5–0	Columbus Blue Jackets	–	Mason	16,925	18–36–7	43	Recap
62	February 26	Columbus Blue Jackets	2–4	Pittsburgh Penguins	–	Sanford	18,602	18–37–7	43	Recap
63	February 28	Detroit Red Wings	5–2	Columbus Blue Jackets	–	Sanford	14,333	18–38–7	43	Recap

March: 9–7–0 (home: 5–3–0; road: 4–4–0)
#	Date	Visitor	Score	Home	OT	Decision	Attendance	Record	Pts	Recap
64	March 1	Columbus Blue Jackets	2–0	Colorado Avalanche	–	Mason	13,236	19–38–7	45	Recap
65	March 3	Columbus Blue Jackets	5–2	Phoenix Coyotes	–	Mason	13,579	20–38–7	47	Recap
66	March 6	Phoenix Coyotes	2–3	Columbus Blue Jackets	–	Mason	10,915	21–38–7	49	Recap
67	March 8	Los Angeles Kings	1–3	Columbus Blue Jackets	–	Mason	14,306	22–38–7	51	Recap
68	March 10	Columbus Blue Jackets	1–4	St. Louis Blues	–	Sanford	19,150	22–39–7	51	Recap
69	March 11	St. Louis Blues	2–1	Columbus Blue Jackets	–	Sanford	14,969	22–40–7	51	Recap
70	March 14	Columbus Blue Jackets	0–3	Edmonton Oilers	–	Sanford	16,839	22–41–7	51	Recap
71	March 17	Columbus Blue Jackets	3–4	Vancouver Canucks	–	Mason	18,890	22–42–7	51	Recap
72	March 18	Columbus Blue Jackets	2–1	Calgary Flames	SO	Mason	19,289	23–42–7	53	Recap
73	March 20	Chicago Blackhawks	5–1	Columbus Blue Jackets	–	Mason	15,211	23–43–7	53	Recap
74	March 23	Carolina Hurricanes	1–5	Columbus Blue Jackets	–	Mason	15,085	24–43–7	55	Recap
75	March 25	Edmonton Oilers	6–3	Columbus Blue Jackets	–	Mason	12,295	24–44–7	55	Recap
76	March 26	Columbus Blue Jackets	2–7	Detroit Red Wings	–	Mason	20,066	24–45–7	55	Recap
77	March 28	Detroit Red Wings	2–4	Columbus Blue Jackets	–	York	12,432	25–45–7	57	Recap
78	March 30	Florida Panthers	1–4	Columbus Blue Jackets	–	York	17,994	26–45–7	59	Recap
79	March 31	Columbus Blue Jackets	5–2	St. Louis Blues	–	York	19,150	27–45–7	61	Recap

April: 2–1–0 (home: 1–0–0; road: 1–1–0)
#	Date	Visitor	Score	Home	OT	Decision	Attendance	Record	Pts	Recap
80	April 3	Columbus Blue Jackets	0–2	Phoenix Coyotes	–	York	13,263	27–46–7	61	Recap
81	April 5	Columbus Blue Jackets	5–2	Colorado Avalanche	–	Mason	15,610	28–46–7	63	Recap
82	April 7	New York Islanders	3–7	Columbus Blue Jackets	–	Mason	17,652	29–46–7	65	Recap

== Player statistics ==
In ice hockey, a combination of a player's goals and assists are collectively called points. Penalty minutes are the total number of minutes assigned to a player for infractions assessed during the season. P Plus–minus is a statistic that tracks when a player was on the ice while goals were scored, both for and against their team, though some in game situations will not effect the statistic. Below is a listing of all player statistics for the Blue Jackets during the season.

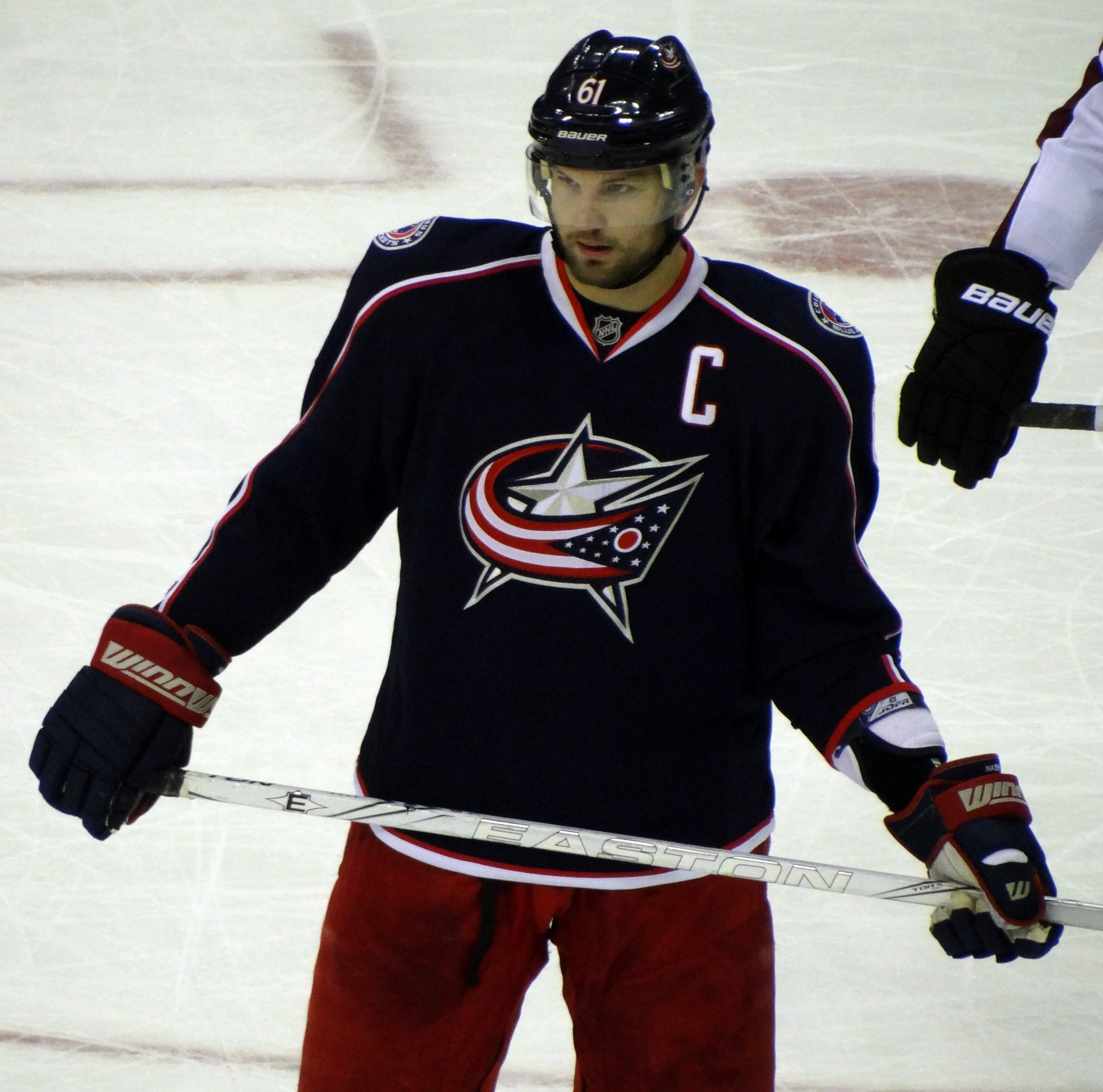
Rick Nash led the Blue Jackets in goals and points

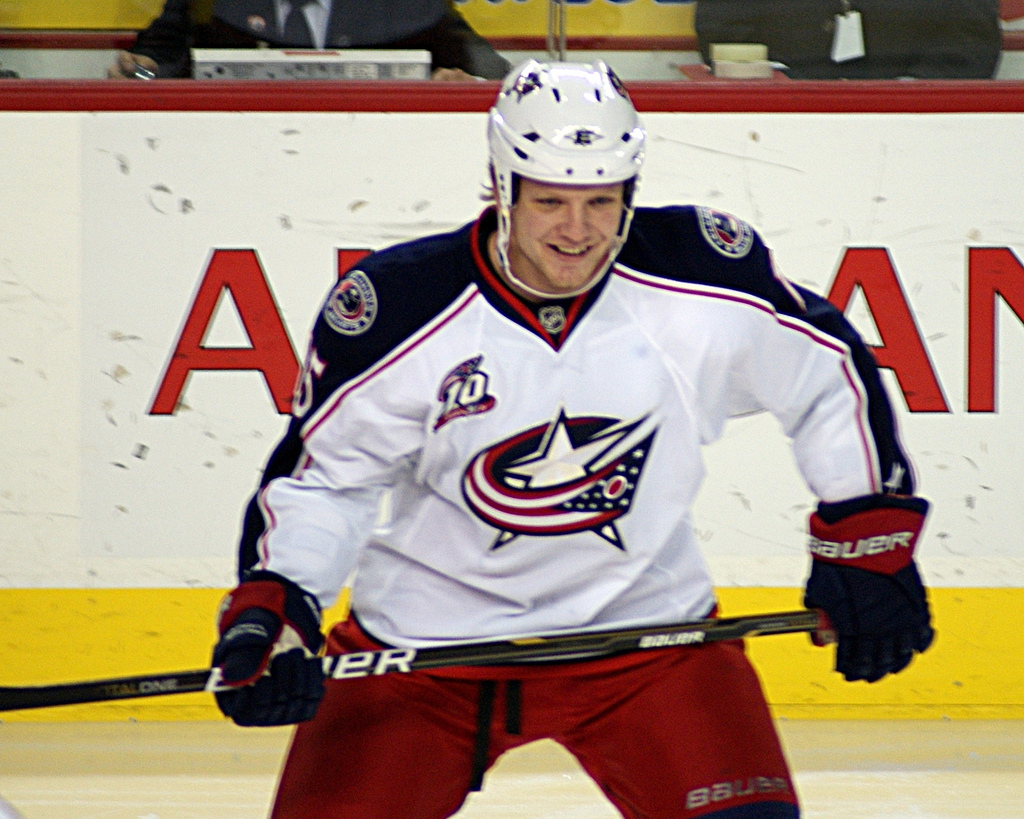
Derek Dorsett led Columbus in penalty minutes

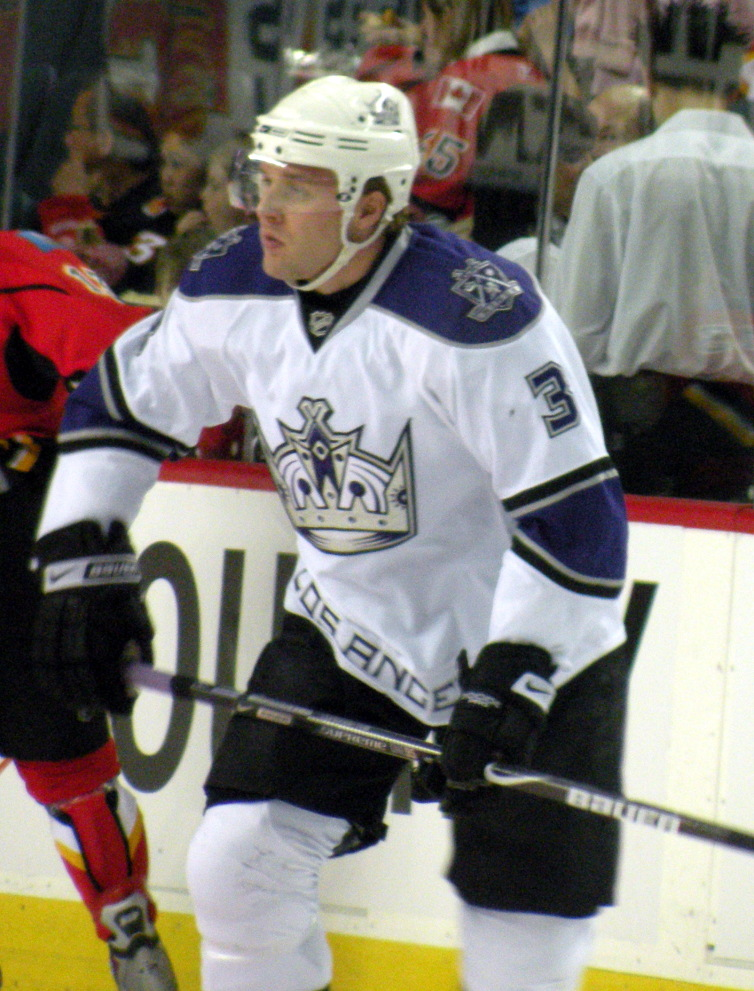
After being acquired from the Los Angeles Kings Jack Johnson registered a plus-minus of +5

=== Skaters ===
Regular season
Player	GP	G	A	Pts	+/–	PIM
Rick Nash	82	30	29	59	−19	40
Vaclav Prospal	82	16	39	55	−11	36
Derick Brassard	74	14	27	41	−20	42
R. J. Umberger	77	20	20	40	−10	27
Nikita Nikitin^{†}	54	7	25	32	−5	14
James Wisniewski	48	6	21	27	−13	37
Antoine Vermette^{‡}	60	8	19	27	−17	12
Fedor Tyutin	66	5	21	26	−21	49
Jeff Carter^{‡}	39	15	10	25	−11	14
Mark Letestu^{†}	51	11	13	24	−3	6
Ryan Johansen	67	9	12	21	−2	24
Derek Dorsett	77	12	8	20	−11	235
Aaron Johnson	56	3	13	16	−12	26
Derek MacKenzie	66	7	7	14	4	40
Cam Atkinson	27	7	7	14	1	14
Jack Johnson^{†}	21	4	10	14	5	15
Grant Clitsome^{‡}	51	4	10	14	−6	24
Samuel Pahlsson^{‡}	61	2	9	11	−6	22
David Savard	31	2	8	10	0	16
Marc Methot	46	1	6	7	−11	24
John Moore	67	2	5	7	−23	8
Colton Gillies^{†}	38	2	4	6	−4	25
Brett Lebda	30	1	3	4	−1	14
Darryl Boyce^{†}	20	0	3	3	−5	19
Jared Boll	54	2	1	3	−8	126
Matt Calvert	13	0	3	3	−5	16
Kris Russell^{‡}	12	2	1	3	−1	13
Ryan Russell	41	2	0	2	−7	2
Maksim Mayorov	10	1	1	2	−3	2
Tomas Kubalik	8	1	1	2	−3	6
Alexandre Giroux	9	1	0	1	−2	8
Radek Martinek	7	1	0	1	−3	0
Cody Bass	14	0	1	1	0	32
Kristian Huselius	2	0	0	0	−2	2
Andrew Joudrey	1	0	0	0	0	0
Dane Byers	8	0	0	0	0	29
Cody Goloubef	1	0	0	0	1	0
Dalton Prout	5	0	0	0	1	0

=== Goaltenders ===
Note: GP = Games played; TOI = Time on ice (minutes); W = Wins; L = Losses; OT = Overtime Losses; GA = Goals against; GAA= Goals against average; SA= Shots against; SV= Saves; Sv% = Save percentage; SO= Shutouts

Regular season

Player	GP	TOI	W	L	OT	GA	GAA	SA	Sv%	SO	G	A	PIM
Steve Mason	46	2534	16	26	3	143	3.39	1355	.894	1	0	2	2
Curtis Sanford	36	1983	10	18	4	86	2.60	971	.911	1	0	0	0
Allen York	11	417	3	2	0	16	2.30	199	.920	0	0	0	0
Shawn Hunwick	1	3	0	0	0	0	0.00	0	.000	0	0	0	0

^{†}Denotes player spent time with another team before joining Blue Jackets. Stats reflect time with the Blue Jackets only.
^{‡}Traded mid-season

== Milestones ==
When Mason was injured in warm-ups late in the year, Columbus was without an active goaltender on their roster. To remedy the situation, the team signed former University of Michigan goaltender Shawn Hunwick to a one-day, amateur tryout contract. After being eliminated from the NCAA Tournament just days prior, Hunwick skipped an astronomy class and drove his worn down 2003 Ford Ranger to Columbus to make the game. He served as the back-up to Allen York during the game, and the following day, he signed a contract for the remainder of the year. With Mason returning from injury, Hunwick was third on the team's depth chart when an injury to York allowed Hunwick to remain as the back-up for the final two games of the year. In the final game of the season, the Blue Jackets were leading the Islanders 7–3 with 2:33 remaining when, at the behest of his teammates, Head Coach Todd Richards put Hunwick in to finish the game. He did not face a shot. Hunwick was the franchise record ninth player to make his NHL debut during the season. Conversely, Vaclav Prospal played in his 1,000th NHL game during the year.

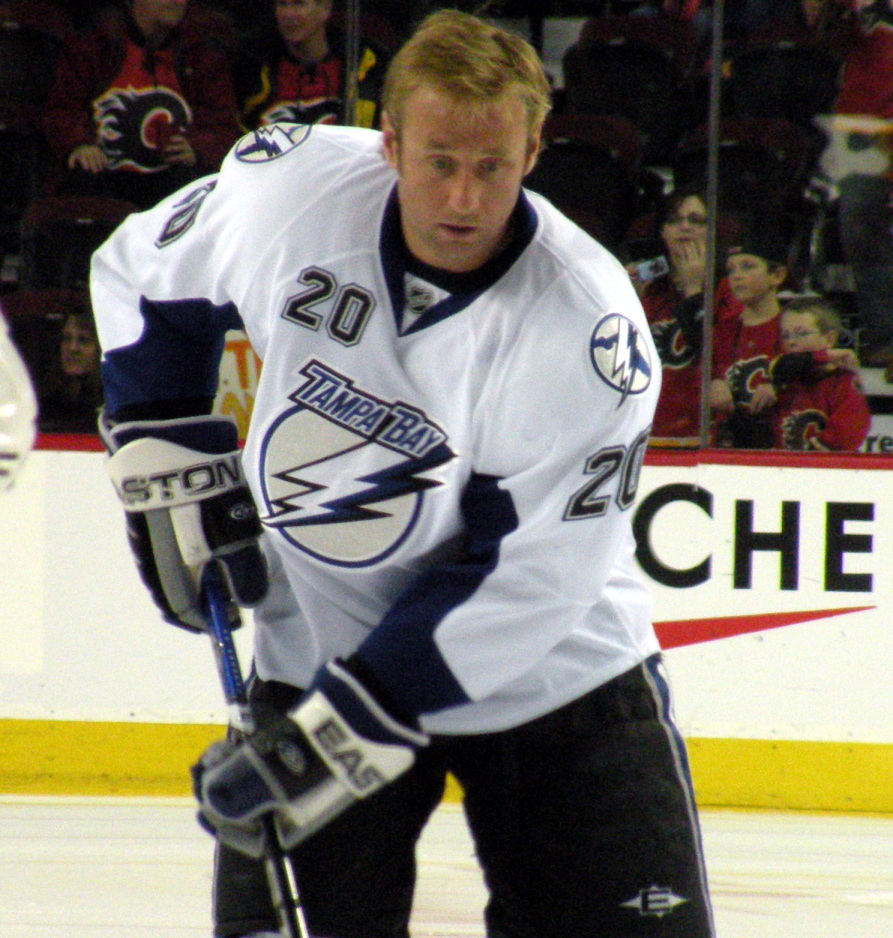
Vaclav Prospal played in his 1,000th NHL game during the season.

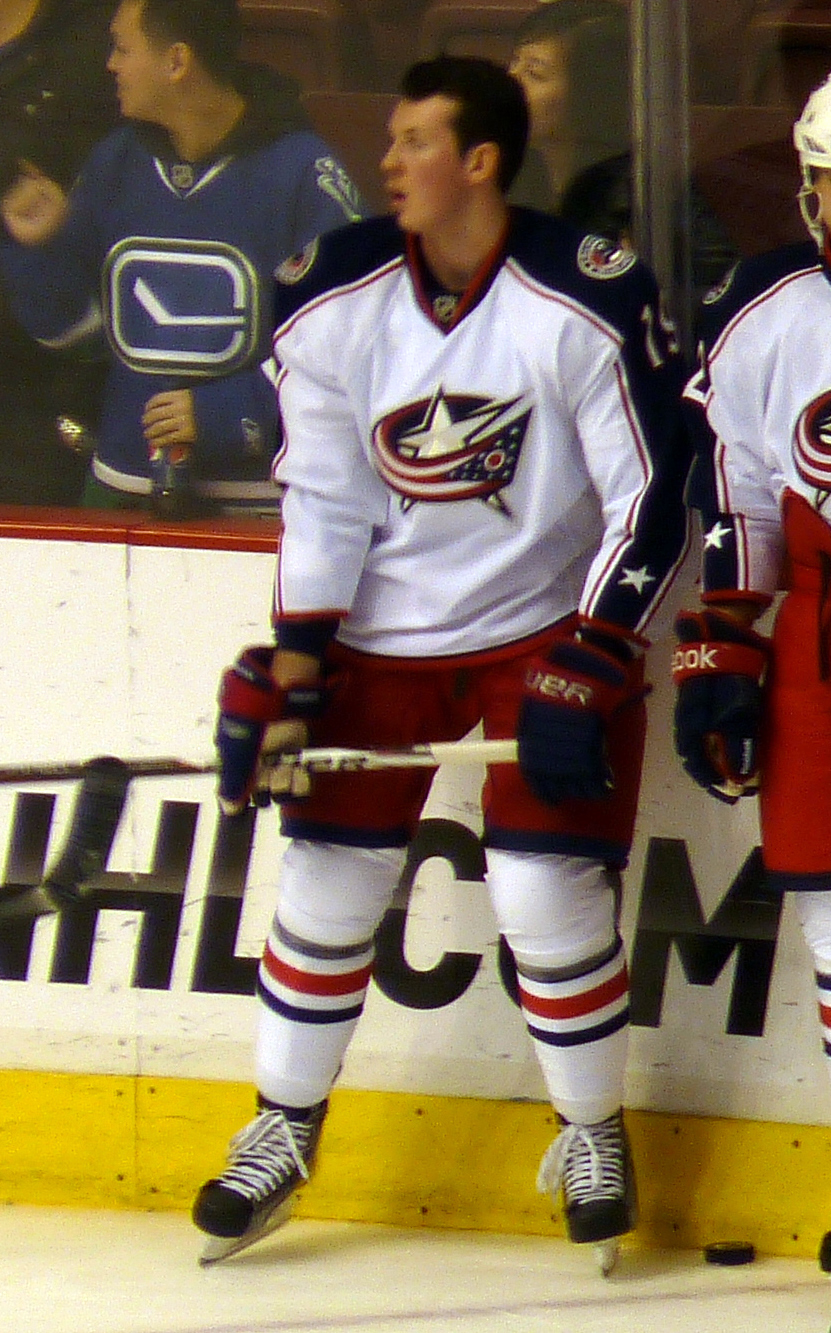
Ryan Johansen was one of five players to score their first career goal in 2011–12.

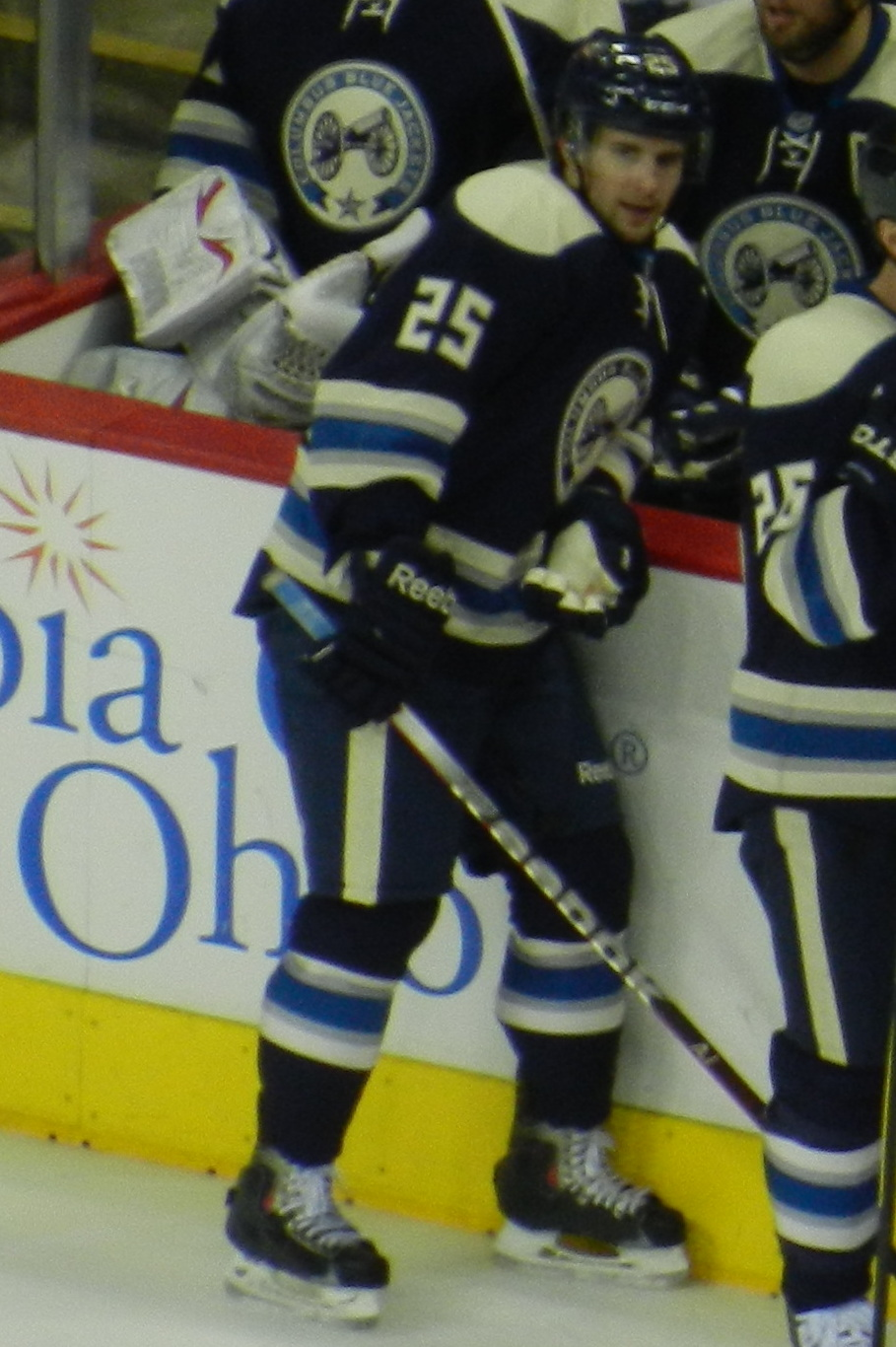
Ryan Russell was one of nine players to make their NHL debut during the year.

Regular season
Player	Milestone	Reached
Cam Atkinson	1st Career NHL Game	October 7, 2011
Ryan Johansen	1st Career NHL Game	October 7, 2011
David Savard	1st Career NHL Game	October 7, 2011
Cam Atkinson	1st Career NHL Goal; 1st Career NHL Point	October 10, 2011
David Savard	1st Career NHL Assist; 1st Career NHL Point	October 15, 2011
Ryan Johansen	1st Career NHL Assist; 1st Career NHL Point	October 22, 2011
Rick Nash	600th Career NHL Game	October 22, 2011
Fedor Tyutin	500th Career NHL Game	October 22, 2011
Ryan Johansen	1st Career NHL Goal	October 25, 2011
John Moore	1st Career NHL Goal; 1st Career NHL Point	October 25, 2011
Allen York	1st Career NHL Game	October 25, 2011
Rick Nash	500th Career NHL Point	November 10, 2011
Antoine Vermette	300th Career NHL Point	November 19, 2011
Derek Dorsett	200th Career NHL Game	November 23, 2011
Vaclav Prospal	1,000th Career NHL Game	November 25, 2011
Jared Boll	300th Career NHL Game	November 27, 2011
Vaclav Prospal	700th Career NHL Point	December 1, 2011
R. J. Umberger	500th Career NHL Game	December 2, 2011
Mark Letestu	100th Career NHL Game	December 10, 2011
John Moore	1st Career NHL Assist	December 29, 2011
Ryan Russell	1st Career NHL Game	January 7, 2012
Tomas Kubalik	1st Career NHL Goal	January 13, 2012
Ryan Russell	1st Career NHL Goal; 1st Career NHL Point	January 13, 2012
Steve Mason	200th Career NHL Game	January 31, 2012
Andrew Joudrey	1st Career NHL Game	February 1, 2012
David Savard	1st Career NHL Goal	February 7, 2012
Colton Gillies	100th Career NHL Game	February 11, 2012
Antoine Vermette	600th Career NHL Game	February 21, 2012
Jeff Carter	500th Career NHL Game	February 21, 2012
Cam Atkinson	1st Career NHL Assist	February 26, 2012
R. J. Umberger	300th Career NHL Point	March 3, 2012
Cam Atkinson	1st Career NHL Hat-trick	March 5, 2012
Maksim Mayorov	1st Career NHL Assist	March 8, 2012
Jack Johnson	100th Career NHL Assist	March 23, 2012
Allen York	1st Career NHL Win	March 28, 2012
Dalton Prout	1st Career NHL Game	March 31, 2012
Cody Goloubef	1st Career NHL Game	March 31, 2012
Nikita Nikitin	100th Career NHL Game	April 3, 2012
Derick Brassard	100th Career NHL Assist	April 7, 2012
Shawn Hunwick	1st Career NHL Game	April 7, 2012

== Transactions ==
During the off-season the Blue Jackets parted ways with defensemen Jan Hejda, Anton Stralman, Sami Lepisto and Mike Commodore. Hejda, who played four of his first five NHL seasons with the Blue Jackets, was offered a contract by Columbus, but felt that the organization undervalued him and left via free agency. Columbus had offered him a three-year, $7.5 million contract. He instead signed a four-year, $13 million deal with the Colorado Avalanche. Stralman and Lepisto were not given qualifying offers which made them unrestricted free agents, and both signed with other teams. Commodore had originally signed a big contract with the Blue Jackets in 2008, but fell out of favor. He was waived, sent to the minors and eventually had his contract bought out. In order to replace the departed players, Columbus not only acquired James Wisniewski, but also signed ten-year NHL veteran Radek Martinek. Martinek played only seven games with the Blue Jackets before suffering a concussion and missing the remainder of the season. Brett Lebda was brought in to replace him.

=== Trades ===
Date	Details
June 23, 2011	To Philadelphia Flyers Jakub Voracek; 1st-round pick in 2011; 3rd-round pick in 2011	To Columbus Blue Jackets Jeff Carter
June 25, 2011	To Ottawa Senators Nikita Filatov	To Columbus Blue Jackets 3rd-round pick in 2011
June 29, 2011	To Montreal Canadiens Conditional 7th-round pick in 2012 (Note: Condition satisfied.)	To Columbus Blue Jackets James Wisniewski (Note: Trade of negotiating rights to.)
July 7, 2011	To Montreal Canadiens Mike Blunden	To Columbus Blue Jackets Ryan Russell
November 8, 2011	To Pittsburgh Penguins 4th-round pick in 2012	To Columbus Blue Jackets Mark Letestu
November 10, 2011	To St. Louis Blues Kris Russell	To Columbus Blue Jackets Nikita Nikitin
February 22, 2012	To Phoenix Coyotes Antoine Vermette	To Columbus Blue Jackets Curtis McElhinney; 2nd-round pick in 2012; Conditional 5th-round pick in 2013 (Note: Pick later became 4th-round pick after condition satisfied.)
February 23, 2012	To Los Angeles Kings Jeff Carter	To Columbus Blue Jackets Jack Johnson; Conditional 1st-round pick in 2012 or 2013 (Note: Columbus elected to receive 1st-round pick in 2013.)
February 27, 2012	To Vancouver Canucks Samuel Pahlsson	To Columbus Blue Jackets Taylor Ellington; 4th-round pick in 2012; 4th-round pick in 2012

=== Free agents signed ===
Player	Former team	Contract terms
Andrew Joudrey	Hershey Bears	2 years, $1.175 million
Nicholas Drazenovic	St. Louis Blues	1 year, $550,000
Mark Dekanich	Nashville Predators	1 year, $575,000
Curtis Sanford	Hamilton Bulldogs	1 year, $600,000
Alexandre Giroux	Edmonton Oilers	1 year, $825,000
Aaron Johnson	Milwaukee Admirals	1 year, $550,000
Radek Martinek	New York Islanders	1 year, $2.2 million
Dane Byers	San Antonio Rampage	1 year, $550,000
Martin St. Pierre	Karpat	1 year, $600,000
Cody Bass	Ottawa Senators	1 year, $600,000
Vaclav Prospal	New York Rangers	1 year, $1.75 million
Brett Lebda	Springfield Falcons	1 year, $700,000
Shawn Hunwick	University of Michigan	1 year, $525,000 entry-level contract

=== Free agents lost ===
Player	New team	Contract terms
Gustaf Wesslau	Djurgardens IF	1 year
Scottie Upshall	Florida Panthers	4 years, $14 million
Mathieu Garon	Tampa Bay Lightning	2 years, $2.6 million
Mike Commodore	Detroit Red Wings	1 year, $1 million
Jan Hejda	Colorado Avalanche	4 years, $13 million
Trevor Frischmon	New York Islanders	1 year, $615,000
Kyle Wilson	Nashville Predators	2 years, $1.1 million
Ben Guite	San Jose Sharks	1 year, $525,000
Sami Lepisto	Chicago Blackhawks	1 year, $750,000
Andrew Murray	San Jose Sharks	1 year, $575,000
Ethan Moreau	Los Angeles Kings	1 year, $600,000
Anton Stralman	New York Rangers	1 year, $900,000

=== Claimed via waivers ===
Player	Former team	Date claimed off waivers
Colton Gillies	Minnesota Wild	January 14, 2012
Darryl Boyce	Toronto Maple Leafs	February 25, 2012

=== Lost via waivers ===
Player	New team	Date claimed off waivers
Grant Clitsome	Winnipeg Jets	February 27, 2012

=== Player signings ===
Player	Date	Contract terms
Grant Clitsome	June 10, 2011	2 years, $2.5 million
Nick Holden	June 20, 2011	1 year, $675,000
Mike Blunden	June 29, 2011	1 year, $615,000
Dalton Prout	July 1, 2011	3 years, $1.995 million entry-level contract
James Wisniewski	July 1, 2011	6 years, $33 million
Marc Methot	July 5, 2011	4 years, $12 million
Dalton Smith	August 8, 2011	3 years, $2.3775 million entry-level contract
Ryan Russell	August 8, 2011	1 year, $525,000
Fedor Tyutin	August 31, 2011	6 years, $27 million contract extension
R. J. Umberger	September 21, 2011	5 years, $23 million contract extension
Vaclav Prospal	February 8, 2012	1 year, $2.5 million contract extension
Boone Jenner	March 28, 2012	3 years, $2.4275 million entry-level contract
Sean Collins	March 28, 2012	2 years, $1.25 million entry-level contract
Will Weber	April 6, 2012	2 years, $1.325 million entry-level contract
Cody Bass	April 9, 2012	1 year, $700,000 contract extension
Jake Hansen	April 12, 2012	2 years, $1.27 million entry-level contract
Nick Drazenovic	April 26, 2012	1 year, $600,000 contract extension
Michael Chaput	April 28, 2012	3 years, $2.12 million entry-level contract
Austin Madaisky	May 19, 2012	3 years, $1.865 million entry-level contract
Derek Dorsett	May 23, 2012	3 years, $4.9 million contract extension
Ryan Russell	May 24, 2012	1 year, $700,000 contract extension
Derek MacKenzie	May 31, 2012	2 years, contract extension

== 2011 draft picks ==
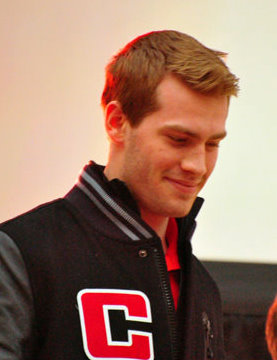
Boone Jenner was the first player selected by the Blue Jackets at the 2011 NHL entry draft

The 2011 NHL entry draft was held in Saint Paul, Minnesota, on June 24 and 25. In the draft, Columbus selected two players who were projected to go higher in the draft. Boone Jenner, a projected second line center, was expected to be a first-round selection, but slipped to the second round. Seth Ambroz, a projected third line enforcer, had some believing he would be taken in the second round prior to falling to the fifth. They filled out the other the remainder of their draft with players considered to have a high upside, but in need of time to develop their game. Their final selection, goaltender Anton Forsberg, was taken following the recommendation of Goaltender Coach Ian Clark. Jenner (Canada), third round pick T. J. Tynan (United States), and Forsberg (Sweden) all played for their national teams at the 2012 World Junior Championship.

Round	#	Player	Position	Nationality	College/junior/club team (league)
2	37	Boone Jenner	C	Canada	Oshawa Generals (OHL)
3	66 (from Ottawa)	T. J. Tynan	C	United States	University of Notre Dame (CCHA)
4	98	Mike Reilly	D	United States	Shattuck-Saint Mary's (Midget Major AAA)
5	128	Seth Ambroz	RW	United States	Omaha Lancers (USHL)
6	158	Lukas Sedlak	C	Czech Republic	HC Ceske Budejovice Jr. (CZREP-JR.)
7	188	Anton Forsberg	G	Sweden	Modo Hockey Jr. (J20 SuperElit)

Draft notes

- The Blue Jackets first and third round picks in the draft, along with Jakub Voracek were traded to the Philadelphia Flyers in exchange for Jeff Carter.
- The Blue Jackets acquired the Ottawa Senators' third round pick in exchange for Nikita Filatov.

== See also ==
- 2011–12 NHL season

== Notes ==
1: The NHL uses a point system for their standings that awards two points for a win and one point an overtime or shootout loss. The denotation of a team's record is wins-losses-overtime/shootout losses.
