= 2011–12 St. Louis Blues season =

National Hockey League team season

2011–12 St. Louis Blues
- Central Division champions
- Division: 1st Central
- Conference: 2nd Western
- 2011–12 record: 49–22–11
- Home record: 30–6–5
- Road record: 19–16–6
- Goals for: 210
- Goals against: 165

Team information
- General manager: Doug Armstrong
- Coach: Davis Payne (Oct.–Nov.); Ken Hitchcock (Nov.–May.)
- Captain: David Backes
- Alternate captains: Barret Jackman; Jamie Langenbrunner; Andy McDonald; Alexander Steen
- Arena: Scottrade Center
- Average attendance: 18,810 (98.2%)

Team leaders
- Goals: David Backes (24)
- Assists: Alex Pietrangelo (39)
- Points: David Backes (54); T. J. Oshie (54)
- Penalty minutes: Ryan Reaves (124)
- Plus/minus: Alexander Steen (+24)
- Wins: Jaroslav Halak (26)
- Goals against average: Brian Elliott (1.56)

The 2011–12 St. Louis Blues season was the 45th season of operation (44th of play) for the National Hockey League (NHL) franchise that was established on June 5, 1967.

The Blues qualified for the Stanley Cup playoffs for the first time since the 2008–09 NHL season, and the second time since the end of the lockout. They also won their first Central division title since the 1999–2000 NHL season.

== Off-Season ==
The Blues extended contracts for all four of their coaches on May 26: Brad Shaw and Ray Bennette (assistant coaches), Corey Hirsch (goaltending consultant) and Scott Masters (video coach).

Forward David Backes is named team captain, filling a vacancy left by Eric Brewer's departure during the previous season.

== Regular season ==
=== November ===
On November 3, St. Louis Cardinals' ace pitcher Chris Carpenter laced up the skates for a practice session with other Blues' players, taking shots and making passes. He played ice hockey in high school at 16 and was an all-state defenseman his last three years for Trinity High School in Manchester, New Hampshire, with scouts from the Chicago Blackhawks and Boston Bruins pursuing him for a hockey career, which he ultimately turned down to pursue a career in baseball. He loved this hockey experience with the Blues, holding season tickets, and will be at Cardinals Night on November 4.

The Blues celebrated Cardinals Night before the game on November 4. Former Cardinals manager Tony La Russa dropped the ceremonial first puck.

The Blues fired head coach Davis Payne (6–7–0 record; 12 points for 13th in Western Conference) on November 6 and replaced him with Ken Hitchcock. Hitchcock became the 24th head coach in Blues' history and agreed to a contract through to the 2012–13 season.

The Blues paid tribute before a home game on November 8, to two of their past players, Pavol Demitra (1996–2004) and Igor Korolev (1992–1994), who died in a September 7 plane crash near Yaroslavl, Russia, that carried the Lokomotiv Yaroslavl team. Both players wore uniform number 38 while with the team. The accident killed 45 players, coaches, team personnel and members of the flight crew. It is the single-largest tragedy in the history of professional hockey.

Chris Stewart was suspended for three games on November 16 as a result of his hit on Detroit Red Wings defenseman Niklas Kronwall in the previous night's game.

Left-winger David Perron was cleared for contact in practice skating on November 19. He has not played since suffering a concussion on November 4, 2010, missing the remaining 72 games last season.

Ken Hitchcock is off to the best start for a new coach for the Blues in their team history after 10 games, with a 7–1–2 (16 points out of a possible 20) record, an 80% success rate, surpassing Joel Quenneville, who started with a 70% success rate through his first 10 games.

On November 28, new goaltender Brian Elliott was named the NHL's Third Star of the Week for the week ending November 27, posting a 3–0–0 (0.98 goals against average, 0.963 save percentage and one shutout) record with wins over the Pittsburgh Penguins (3–2 in overtime), Calgary Flames (2–0) and Columbus Blue Jackets (2–1). He presently leads the League with his 1.31 GAA and .951 save percentage, and tied with his three shutouts.

=== December ===
On December 2, injured forward David Perron was activated for the December 3 game in St. Louis, his first regular season game since suffering his concussion against the San Jose Sharks on November 4, 2010. He missed 97 games.

=== January ===
Ron Caron, former Blues general manager (1983–1993, December 1996–June 1997), died at 82 in his Montreal home on January 9, the night before the Blues shut out the Montreal Canadiens at the Bell Centre, a team for which Caron was a longtime scout and assistant general manager. Caron led the Blues to a 438–405–127 record during his years, including a 47–22–11 (105 points) in 1990–91, the third-best record in Blues' history. The Blues qualified for the playoffs in each of Caron's 12 years as GM. Former Blues' Hall of Fame center Bernie Federko said he did not know a more passionate hockey man in the world.

Goaltender Brian Elliott was named to the 2012 All-Star Game in Ottawa on January 29.

=== February ===
Andy McDonald recorded an assist on the first goal of the game on February 12, his first game back after missing 51 games recovering from a concussion.

David Perron was named the Third Star of the Week after scoring six goals, an assist and posting a +5 plus-minus rating in four games in the week ending February 12. He has 24 points (10 goals and 14 assists) in 30 games.

=== March ===
The Blues climbed atop the NHL standings with a 3–1 win at home over the Anaheim Ducks on March 8, giving them an NHL-best 93 points (43–18–7). It is the latest date the Blues have been first this late in a season since March 9, 2000. They were 30th (last) in the NHL as recently as the 2005–06 season. They have an NHL-leading 46 points since January 1, and are a perfect 35–0 when scoring at least three goals in a game. They were 6–7 when Head Coach Ken Hitchcock took over on November 6.

The Blues announced they had signed 19-year-old center Jaden Schwartz, their first overall 2010 draft pick to an entry-level contract on March 12. He was immediately added to the Blues' roster.
He scored in his first NHL game on March 17 in Tampa against the Lightning. The goal proved to be the game-winner in the 3–1 win, the 13th player in Blues' history to perform the feat.
In that same game, the Blues became the first team to attain 100 points, as well as the first to clinch a playoff spot.

Alexander Steen was activated on March 25 after missing 39 games due to concussion syndrome since last playing on December 27. Kris Russell also returned to the lineup since experiencing a concussion on February 23.

The Blues set their all-time franchise record with Brian Elliott's eighth shutout of the season (in only 35 appearances) on March 25, giving the Blues 14 for the season. Additionally, Jaroslav Halak has six shutouts in 43 appearances. The duo broke the previous record of 13 set by Glenn Hall and Jacques Plante from the 1968–69 season. Elliott also tied Hall with his eighth shutout of the season, though Hall still owns the team record with 16 shutouts.

The Blues set their all-time franchise record with their 30th home win on March 27. More records were set with goalie Brian Elliott's Most Consecutive Shutout Minutes (186:33), surpassing Manny Legace's 186:15. His ninth shutout against the Nashville Predators surpassed Glenn Hall's record of eight for a season. Elliott and Halak have combined for a modern-era NHL record of 15 shutouts, extending their previous record of 14 set March 25. The team's 105 points are their second-best in their history, surpassed only by the 1999–2000 season when they earned 114 points and won their first Presidents' Trophy.

They clinched the Central Division title on March 31.

=== April ===
Brian Elliott's shutout streak ended on April 4, after 241:33. It was a new franchise record beating Manny Legace's previous record of 186:15 set from Dec. 28, 2007 to Jan. 8, 2008.

Elliott and Jaroslav Halak captured the William Jennings Trophy for the first time in leading the NHL in fewest goals allowed by a team's goaltenders with 165. Excluding 10 shootout goals allowed, the Blues allowed only 155 goals over their 82-game regular season, breaking the all-time record for fewest goals allowed in an 82-game season, which had been set at 164 by the 2003–04 New Jersey Devils. It was only the second time in franchise history that the Blues goaltenders were awarded the William Jennings Trophy, as Roman Turek and Jamie McLennan had received the honor in the 1999–2000 season. The Blues also tied the modern NHL record with the 1969–70 Chicago Blackhawks, with 15 shutouts. Combined with the 5 shutouts against the Blues, 20 of the Blues' 82 regular-season games ended in a shutout. Elliott and Halak are the first tandem goaltenders to record at least six shutouts each in the same season; Elliot had nine. He led the NHL with a 1.56 goals-against average and a .940 save percentage. His three consecutive shutouts tied the franchise record of Greg Millen in the 1988–89 season. Halak ranked fifth with a 1.97 goals-against average and a .926 save percentage. They will be honored on June 20 at the 2012 NHL Awards.

The Blues' lost only six of 41 home games, and their .793 own-ice percentage was their best in franchise history.

== Playoffs ==
The Blues ended the 2011–12 regular season as the Western Conference's 2nd seed. They defeated the #7 seed San Jose Sharks 4–1 in the first round, winning their first playoff series since 2002. They next faced the #8 seed Los Angeles Kings in the second round and were swept out of the playoffs by the eventual Stanley Cup champions.

Game three of the Blues-Sharks (Monday) April 16 playoff was the highest-rated Blues' game ever broadcast on Fox Sports Midwest with an 11.0 household rating. Game three of the 2001 playoff game against the Dallas Stars was the previous high with a 9.9 household rating, followed by a 9.8 rating for game four of that series, and fourth-highest a 9.7 rating for the game one opener with the Sharks on (Thursday) April 12, 2012.

== Standings ==
Central Division
Pos	Team	GP	W	L	OTL	ROW	GF	GA	GD	Pts
1	y – St. Louis Blues	82	49	22	11	45	210	165	+45	109
2	x – Nashville Predators	82	48	26	8	43	237	210	+27	104
3	x – Detroit Red Wings	82	48	28	6	39	248	203	+45	102
4	x – Chicago Blackhawks	82	45	26	11	38	248	238	+10	101
5	Columbus Blue Jackets	82	29	46	7	25	202	262	−60	65

Source: National Hockey League
x – Clinched playoff spot; y – Clinched division

Western Conference
Pos	Div	Team	GP	W	L	OTL	ROW	GF	GA	GD	Pts
1	NW	p – Vancouver Canucks	82	51	22	9	43	249	198	+51	111
2	CE	y – St. Louis Blues	82	49	22	11	45	210	165	+45	109
3	PA	y – Phoenix Coyotes	82	42	27	13	36	216	204	+12	97
4	CE	x – Nashville Predators	82	48	26	8	43	237	210	+27	104
5	CE	x – Detroit Red Wings	82	48	28	6	39	248	203	+45	102
6	CE	x – Chicago Blackhawks	82	45	26	11	38	248	238	+10	101
7	PA	x – San Jose Sharks	82	43	29	10	34	228	210	+18	96
8	PA	x – Los Angeles Kings	82	40	27	15	34	194	179	+15	95
9	NW	Calgary Flames	82	37	29	16	34	202	226	−24	90
10	PA	Dallas Stars	82	42	35	5	35	211	222	−11	89
11	NW	Colorado Avalanche	82	41	35	6	32	208	220	−12	88
12	NW	Minnesota Wild	82	35	36	11	24	177	226	−49	81
13	PA	Anaheim Ducks	82	34	36	12	31	204	231	−27	80
14	NW	Edmonton Oilers	82	32	40	10	27	212	239	−27	74
15	CE	Columbus Blue Jackets	82	29	46	7	25	202	262	−60	65

Source: National Hockey League
p – Clinched Presidents' Trophy; x – Clinched playoff spot; y – Clinched division

== Schedule and results ==
=== Pre-season ===
2011 Pre-season game log: 5–3–0 (Home: 2–2–0; Road: 3–1–0)
#	Date	Visitor	Score	Home	OT	Decision	Record	Recap
1	September 20	Tampa Bay Lightning	1–3	St. Louis Blues		W
2	September 21 (in Orlando, Florida)	St. Louis Blues	4–3	Tampa Bay Lightning		W
3	September 22	Minnesota Wild	1–0	St. Louis Blues		L
4	September 23	St. Louis Blues	3–2	Colorado Avalanche		W
5	September 24	St. Louis Blues	2–3	Dallas Stars		L
6	September 27	St. Louis Blues	4–3	Minnesota Wild		W
7	September 29	Colorado Avalanche	1–3	St. Louis Blues		W
8	October 1	Dallas Stars	4–0	St. Louis Blues		L

=== Regular season ===
2011–12 Game Log

October: 5–6–0 (Home: 2–1–0; Road: 3–5–0)
#	Date	Visitor	Score	Home	OT	Decision	Attendance	Record	Pts	Recap
1	October 8	Nashville Predators	4–2	St. Louis Blues		Halak	19,150	0–1–0	0	Nsh 4, StL 2
2	October 10	Calgary Flames	2–5	St. Louis Blues		Halak	19,150	1–1–0	2	StL 5, Cgy 2
3	October 13	St. Louis Blues	2–3	Dallas Stars		Halak	7,949	1–2–0	2	Dal 3, StL 2
4	October 15	St. Louis Blues	4–2	San Jose Sharks		Elliott	17,562	2–2–0	4	StL 4, SJS 2
5	October 16	St. Louis Blues	2–4	Anaheim Ducks		Halak	14,555	2–3–0	4	Ana 4, StL 2
6	October 18	St. Louis Blues	0–5	Los Angeles Kings		Halak	18,118	2–4–0	4	LAK 5, StL 0
7	October 21	Carolina Hurricanes	2–3	St. Louis Blues	OT	Elliott	19,150	3–4–0	6	StL 3, Car 2 OT
8	October 22	St. Louis Blues	4–2	Philadelphia Flyers		Elliott	19,593	4–4–0	8	StL 4, Phi 2
9	October 26	St. Louis Blues	3–0	Vancouver Canucks		Elliott	18,860	5–4–0	10	StL 3, Van 0
10	October 28	St. Louis Blues	1–3	Calgary Flames		Elliott	19,289	5–5–0	10	Cal 3, StL 1
11	October 30	St. Louis Blues	2–4	Edmonton Oilers		Halak	16,839	5–6–0	10	Edm 4, StL 2

November: 9–2–2 (Home: 6–1–1; Road: 3–1–1)
#	Date	Visitor	Score	Home	OT	Decision	Attendance	Record	Pts	Recap
12	November 4	Vancouver Canucks	2–3	St. Louis Blues		Elliott	19,150	6–6–0	12	StL 3, Van 2
13	November 5	St. Louis Blues	1–2	Minnesota Wild		Halak	16,917	6–7–0	12	Min 2, StL 1
14	November 8	Chicago Blackhawks	0–3	St. Louis Blues		Halak	19,150	7–7–0	14	StL 3, Chi 0
15	November 10	Toronto Maple Leafs	3–2	St. Louis Blues	SO	Halak	19,150	7–7–1	15	Tor 3, StL 2 SO
16	November 12	Tampa Bay Lightning	0–3	St. Louis Blues		Elliott	19,150	8–7–1	17	StL 3, TBL 0
17	November 15	Detroit Red Wings	1–2	St. Louis Blues		Elliott	19,150	9–7–1	19	StL 2, Det 1
18	November 17	Florida Panthers	1–4	St. Louis Blues		Halak	17,642	10–7–1	21	StL 4, FLA 1
19	November 19	St. Louis Blues	2–3	Minnesota Wild	SO	Halak	17,259	10–7–2	22	Min 3, StL 2 SO
20	November 22	Los Angeles Kings	3–2	St. Louis Blues		Halak	18,178	10–8–2	22	LAK 3, StL 2
21	November 23	St. Louis Blues	3–2	Pittsburgh Penguins	OT	Elliott	18,583	11–8–2	24	StL 3, Pit 2 OT
22	November 25	Calgary Flames	0–2	St. Louis Blues		Elliott	19,150	12–8–2	26	StL 2, Cgy 0
23	November 27	St. Louis Blues	2–1	Columbus Blue Jackets		Elliott	14,151	13–8–2	28	StL 2, CBJ 1
24	November 29	St. Louis Blues	2–1	Washington Capitals		Halak	18,506	14–8–2	30	StL 2, Wsh 1

December: 7–4–3 (Home: 6–1–1; Road: 1–3–2)
#	Date	Visitor	Score	Home	OT	Decision	Attendance	Record	Pts	Recap
25	December 2	St. Louis Blues	2–3	Colorado Avalanche	SO	Halak	15,966	14–8–3	31	Col 3, StL 2 SO
26	December 3	Chicago Blackhawks	5–2	St. Louis Blues		Elliott	19,150	14–9–3	31	Chi 5, StL 2
27	December 6	Detroit Red Wings	2–3	St. Louis Blues		Elliott	19,150	15–9–3	33	StL 3, Det 2
28	December 8	Anaheim Ducks	2–4	St. Louis Blues		Halak	18,596	16–9–3	35	StL 4, Ana 2
29	December 10	San Jose Sharks	0–1	St. Louis Blues		Elliott	19,150	17–9–3	37	StL 1, SJS 0
30	December 15	New York Rangers	1–4	St. Louis Blues		Elliott	18,121	18–9–3	39	StL 4, NYR 1
31	December 17	St. Louis Blues	1–2	Nashville Predators	OT	Halak	17,113	18–9–4	40	Nsh 2, StL 1 OT
32	December 18	Columbus Blue Jackets	4–6	St. Louis Blues		Halak	18,611	19–9–4	42	StL 6, CBJ 4
33	December 21	St. Louis Blues	2–3	Colorado Avalanche		Elliott	15,421	19–10–4	42	Col 3, StL 2
34	December 23	St. Louis Blues	3–2	Phoenix Coyotes		Elliott	12,650	20–10–4	44	StL 3, Phx 2
35	December 26	Dallas Stars	3–5	St. Louis Blues		Halak	18,842	21–10–4	46	StL 5, Dal 3
36	December 27	St. Louis Blues	2–3	Detroit Red Wings		Elliott	20,066	21–11–4	46	Det 3, StL 2
37	December 30	Nashville Predators	2–1	St. Louis Blues	SO	Halak	19,150	21–11–5	47	Nsh 3, StL 2 SO
38	December 31	St. Louis Blues	0–3	Detroit Red Wings		Elliott	20,066	21–12–5	47	Det 3, StL 0

January: 8–1–2 (Home: 7–0–2; Road: 1–1–0)
#	Date	Visitor	Score	Home	OT	Decision	Attendance	Record	Pts	Recap
39	January 3	Phoenix Coyotes	1–4	St. Louis Blues		Halak	18,112	22–12–5	49	StL 3, Phx 1
40	January 5	Edmonton Oilers	3–4	St. Louis Blues		Halak	18,428	23–12–5	51	StL 4, Edm 3
41	January 7	Colorado Avalanche	0–4	St. Louis Blues		Elliott	19,150	24–12–5	53	StL 4, Col 0
42	January 10	St. Louis Blues	3–0	Montreal Canadiens		Halak	21,273	25–12–5	55	StL 3, Mon 0
43	January 12	Vancouver Canucks	3–2	St. Louis Blues	OT	Elliott	18,231	25–12–6	56	Van 3, StL 2 OT
44	January 14	Minnesota Wild	2–3	St. Louis Blues	SO	Halak	19,150	26–12–6	58	StL 3, Min 2 SO
45	January 16	Dallas Stars	0–1	St. Louis Blues		Halak	18,036	27–12–6	60	StL 1, Dal 0
46	January 19	Edmonton Oilers	0–1	St. Louis Blues		Halak	17,432	28–12–6	62	StL 1, Edm 0
47	January 21	Buffalo Sabres	2–4	St. Louis Blues		Halak	19,150	29–12–6	64	StL 4, Buf 2
48	January 23	St. Louis Blues	1–3	Detroit Red Wings		Halak	20,066	29–13–6	64	Det 3, StL 1
49	January 24	Pittsburgh Penguins	3–2	St. Louis Blues	SO	Elliott	18,471	29–13–7	65	Pit 2, StL 1 SO

February: 11–4–0 (Home: 5–1–0; Road: 6–3–0)
#	Date	Visitor	Score	Home	OT	Decision	Attendance	Record	Pts	Recap
50	February 3	Los Angeles Kings	0–1	St. Louis Blues		Halak	18,811	30–13–7	67	StL 1, LAK 0
51	February 4	St. Louis Blues	1–3	Nashville Predators		Halak	17,113	30–14–7	67	Nsh 3, StL 1
52	February 7	St. Louis Blues	3–1	Ottawa Senators		Elliott	18,952	31–14–7	69	StL 3, Ott 1
53	February 9	St. Louis Blues	4–3	New Jersey Devils	SO	Elliott	15,021	32–14–7	71	StL 4, NJD 3 SO
54	February 11	Colorado Avalanche	2–3	St. Louis Blues	OT	Elliott	19,150	33–14–7	73	StL 3, Col 2 OT
55	February 12	San Jose Sharks	0–3	St. Louis Blues		Halak	18,447	34–14–7	75	StL 3, SJS 0
56	February 14	St. Louis Blues	1–2	Columbus Blue Jackets		Halak	12,425	34–15–7	75	CBJ 2, StL 1
57	February 16	New York Islanders	1–5	St. Louis Blues		Elliott	18,434	35–15–7	77	StL 5, NYI 1
58	February 18	Minnesota Wild	0–4	St. Louis Blues		Elliott	19,150	36–15–7	79	StL 4, Min 0
59	February 19	St. Louis Blues	1–3	Chicago Blackhawks		Elliott	22,077	36–16–7	79	Chi 3, StL 1
60	February 22	Boston Bruins	4–2	St. Louis Blues		Elliott	18,460	36–17–7	79	Bos 4, StL 2
61	February 23	St. Louis Blues	3–2	Nashville Predators	SO	Halak	16,828	37–17–7	81	StL 3, Nsh 2 SO
62	February 25	St. Louis Blues	3–2	Winnipeg Jets	SO	Halak	15,004	38–17–7	83	StL 3, Wpg 2 SO
63	February 27	St. Louis Blues	3–1	Calgary Flames		Halak	19,289	39–17–7	85	StL 3, Cal 1
64	February 29	St. Louis Blues	5–2	Edmonton Oilers		Halak	16,839	40–17–7	87	StL 5, Edm 2

March: 8–4–3 (Home: 4–1–0; Road: 4–3–3)
#	Date	Visitor	Score	Home	OT	Decision	Attendance	Record	Pts	Recap
65	March 1	St. Louis Blues	0–2	Vancouver Canucks		Elliott	18,890	40–18–7	87	Van 2, StL 0
66	March 3	St. Louis Blues	3–1	San Jose Sharks		Halak	17,562	41–18–7	89	StL 3, SJS 1
67	March 6	Chicago Blackhawks	1–5	St. Louis Blues		Halak	19,150	42–18–7	91	StL 5, Chi 1
68	March 8	Anaheim Ducks	1–3	St. Louis Blues		Halak	19,150	43–18–7	93	StL 3, Ana 1
69	March 10	Columbus Blue Jackets	1–4	St. Louis Blues		Elliott	19,150	44–18–7	95	StL 4, CBJ 1
70	March 11	St. Louis Blues	2–1	Columbus Blue Jackets		Halak	14,969	45–18–7	97	StL 2, CBJ 1
71	March 13	St. Louis Blues	3–4	Chicago Blackhawks	SO	Halak	21,349	45–18–8	98	Chi 4, StL 3 SO
72	March 15	St. Louis Blues	0–2	Carolina Hurricanes		Elliott	18,680	45–19–8	98	Car 2, StL 0
73	March 17	St. Louis Blues	3–1	Tampa Bay Lightning		Halak	18,777	46–19–8	100	StL 3, TBL 1
74	March 21	St. Louis Blues	3–4	Anaheim Ducks		Halak	14,494	46–20–8	100	Ana 4, StL 3
75	March 22	St. Louis Blues	0–1	Los Angeles Kings	SO	Elliott	18,118	46–20–9	101	LAK 4, StL 3 SO
76	March 25	St. Louis Blues	4–0	Phoenix Coyotes		Elliott	12,585	47–20–9	103	StL 4, Phx 0
77	March 27	Nashville Predators	0–3	St. Louis Blues		Elliott	19,150	48–20–9	105	StL 3, Nsh 0
78	March 29	St. Louis Blues	3–4	Chicago Blackhawks	SO	Halak	21,659	48–20–10	106	Chi 4, StL 3 SO
79	March 31	Columbus Blue Jackets	5–2	St. Louis Blues		Halak	19,150	48–21–10	106	CBJ 5, StL 2

April: 1–1–1 (Home: 0–1–1; Road: 1–0–0)
#	Date	Visitor	Score	Home	OT	Decision	Attendance	Record	Pts	Recap
80	April 4	Detroit Red Wings	3–2	St. Louis Blues	SO	Elliott	18,755	48–21–11	107	Det 3, StL 2 SO
81	April 6	Phoenix Coyotes	4–1	St. Louis Blues		Elliott	19,150	48–22–11	107	Phx 4, StL 1
82	April 7	St. Louis Blues	3–2	Dallas Stars		Halak	16,560	49–22–11	109	StL 3, Dal 2

Legend: Win (2 points) Loss (0 points) Overtime/shootout loss (1 point)

=== Playoffs ===
Key: Win Loss

2012 Stanley Cup playoffs

Western Conference Quarterfinals: vs. (7) San Jose Sharks – St. Louis won series 4–1
#	Date	Visitor	Score	Home	OT	Decision	Attendance	Series (STL–SJS)	Recap
1	April 12	San Jose	3–2	St. Louis	2OT	Halak	19,333	0–1	SJS 3, StL 2 2OT
2	April 14	San Jose	0–3	St. Louis		Halak	19,500	1–1	StL 3, SJS 0
3	April 16	St. Louis	4–3	San Jose		Elliott	17,562	2–1	StL 4, SJS 3
4	April 19	St. Louis	2–1	San Jose		Elliott	17,562	3–1	StL 2, SJS 1
5	April 21	San Jose	1–3	St. Louis		Elliott	19,490	4–1	StL 3, SJS 1

Western Conference Semifinals vs. (8) Los Angeles Kings: Los Angeles won series 4–0
#	Date	Visitor	Score	Home	OT	Decision	Attendance	Series (STL–LAK)	Recap
1	April 28	Los Angeles	3–1	St. Louis		Elliott	19,391	0–1	LAK 3, StL 1
2	April 30	Los Angeles	5–2	St. Louis		Elliott	19,366	0–2	LAK 5, StL 2
3	May 3	St. Louis	2–4	Los Angeles		Elliott	18,362	0–3	LAK 4, StL 2
4	May 6	St. Louis	1–3	Los Angeles		Elliott	18,373	0–4	LAK 3, StL 1

== Player statistics ==
=== Skaters ===
(Regular season through games of April 21, 2012) FINAL

Stats

Note: GP = Games played; G = Goals; A = Assists; Pts = Points; +/− = Plus/minus; PIM = Penalty minutes

Regular season

Player	GP	G	A	Pts	+/−	PIM
David Backes	**82**	**24**	30	**54**	15	101
T. J. Oshie	80	19	35	**54**	15	50
Alex Pietrangelo	81	12	**39**	51	16	36
Kevin Shattenkirk	81	9	34	43	20	60
David Perron	57	21	21	42	19	28
Patrik Berglund	**82**	19	19	38	4	30
Jason Arnott	72	17	17	34	13	26
Chris Stewart	79	15	15	30	1	109
Alexander Steen	43	15	13	28	**24**	28
Jamie Langenbrunner	70	6	18	24	7	32
Andy McDonald	25	10	12	22	4	2
Vladimir Sobotka	73	5	15	20	12	42
Carlo Colaiacovo	64	2	17	19	7	22
Matt D'Agostini	55	9	9	18	12	27
Barret Jackman	81	1	12	13	20	57
Roman Polak	77	0	11	11	6	57
Kris Russell ^{†} (Nov. 12 -)	43	4	5	9	13	12
Scott Nichol	80	3	5	8	−5	83
Kent Huskins	25	2	5	7	9	10
Chris Porter	47	4	3	7	−1	11
Ian Cole	26	1	5	6	7	22
Ryan Reaves	60	3	1	4	0	**124**
Evgeny Grachev *	26	1	3	4	−4	2
B. J. Crombeen	40	1	2	3	−2	71
Jaden Schwartz (Mar. 17 –)	7	2	1	3	1	0
Adam Cracknell *	2	1	0	1	1	0
Cade Fairchild *	5	0	1	1	−1	0
Brett Sterling *	4	0	0	0	−1	0
Nikita Nikitin ^{‡} ( – Nov. 10)	7	0	0	0	−5	4
Taylor Chorney ^{†‡} (Nov. 4 – Nov. 5)	2	0	0	0	0	0

* indicates not currently on the active roster.
^{+} indicates on Injured Reserve.
^{‡}Traded away mid-season, date of last game in ( ). Stats reflect time with Blues only.
^{†}Denotes player spent time with another team before joining Blues, date of first game in ( ). Stats reflect time with Blues only. **Bold** = leading team in category.

Playoffs

Player	GP	G	A	Pts	+/−	PIM
Andy McDonald	9	5	5	10	−2	8
Patrik Berglund	9	3	4	7	2	6
David Perron	9	1	4	5	−4	10
Alex Pietrangelo	8	0	5	5	−1	0
David Backes	9	2	2	4	−5	18
Alexander Steen	9	1	2	3	−2	6
Kris Russell	9	0	3	3	3	5
T. J. Oshie	9	0	3	3	−2	6
Carlo Colaiacovo	7	0	3	3	2	16
Chris Stewart	7	2	0	2	−1	12
Kevin Shattenkirk	9	1	1	2	−3	6
Vladimir Sobotka	9	1	1	2	0	15
Jamie Langenbrunner	9	1	0	1	−1	11
Jason Arnott	7	1	0	1	−1	0
B. J. Crombeen	7	1	0	1	−1	31
Matt D'Agostini	4	1	0	1	0	4
Barret Jackman	9	0	1	1	−8	21
Scott Nichol	9	0	1	1	−3	14
Roman Polak	9	0	0	0	−3	19
Kent Huskins	1	0	0	0	0	2
Ian Cole	2	0	0	0	−1	0
Ryan Reaves	2	0	0	0	0	0

=== Goaltenders ===
(Updated through April 7, 2012) FINAL
Stats

Note: GP = Games played; TOI = Time on ice (minutes); W = Wins; L = Losses; OT = Overtime losses; GA = Goals against; GAA= Goals against average; SA= Shots against; SV= Saves; Sv% = Save percentage; SO= Shutouts

Regular season

Player	GP	Min	W	L	OT	GA	GAA	SA	Sv%	SO	G	A	PIM
Jaroslav Halak	46	2,747	26	12	7	90	1.97	1,211	.926	6	0	0	0
Brian Elliott	38	2,235	23	10	4	58	**1.56**	972	**.940**	9	0	0	0
**TOTALS**	**82**	**4,982**	**49**	**22**	**11**	**148**	**1.78**	**2,183**	**.932**	**15** *	**0**	**0**	**0**

BOLD = individual leading NHL * = Modern NHL Record

Playoffs (Updated through May 6, 2012) FINAL

Player	GP	Min	W	L	GA	GAA	SA	Sv%	SO	G	A	PIM
Brian Elliott	8	455	3	4	18	2.37	187	.904	0	0	0	2
Jaroslav Halak	2	104	1	1	3	1.73	46	.935	0	0	0	0
Jake Allen	1	1	0	0	0	0.00	0	.000	0	0	0	0

== Awards and records ==
=== Awards ===
Regular Season
Player	Award	Awarded
Brian Elliott	NHL Third Star of the Week	November 28, 2011
David Perron	NHL Third Star of the Week	February 13, 2012
Jaroslav Halak	NHL Third Star of the Week	March 12, 2012

=== Milestones ===
Regular Season
Player	Milestone	Reached
Vladimir Sobotka	200th Career NHL Game	October 8, 2011
Alex Pietrangelo	100th Career NHL Game	October 15, 2011
Evgeny Grachev	1st Career NHL Assist; 1st Career NHL Point	October 22, 2011
Chris Stewart	200th Career NHL Game	October 22, 2011
Matt D'Agostini	200th Career NHL Game	November 15, 2011
T. J. Oshie	200th Career NHL Game	November 17, 2011
Cade Fairchild	1st Career NHL Game	November 29, 2011
Kris Russell	300th Career NHL Game	December 6, 2011
Jason Arnott	1,200th Career NHL Game	December 8, 2011
Kevin Shattenkirk	100th Career NHL Game	December 10, 2011
Carlo Colaiacovo	100th Career NHL Assist	December 18, 2011
Evgeny Grachev	1st Career NHL Goal	December 26, 2011
David Backes	400th Career NHL Game	December 27, 2011
Cade Fairchild	1st Career NHL Assist; 1st Career NHL Point	January 12, 2012
Scott Nichol	600th Career NHL Game	January 23, 2012
T. J. Oshie	100th Career NHL Assist	February 16, 2012
Jaroslav Halak	100th Career NHL Win	February 23, 2012
Patrik Berglund	300th Career NHL Game	March 15, 2012
Jaroslav Halak	200th Career NHL Game	March 17, 2012
Roman Polak	300th Career NHL Game	March 17, 2012
Jaden Schwartz	1st Career NHL Game; 1st Career NHL Goal; 1st Career NHL Point	March 17, 2012
Jaden Schwartz	1st Career NHL Assist	March 25, 2012
Jamie Langenbrunner	1,100th Career NHL Game	March 27, 2012

== Transactions ==
The Blues have been involved in the following transactions during the 2011–12 season

=== Trades ===
Date	Details
June 25, 2011	To New York Rangers 3rd-round pick in 2011	To St. Louis Blues Evgeny Grachev
November 10, 2011	To Columbus Blue Jackets Nikita Nikitin	To St. Louis Blues Kris Russell
February 26, 2012	To Ottawa Senators Ben Bishop	To St. Louis Blues 2nd-round pick in 2013

=== Free agents signed ===
Player	Former team	Contract terms
Kyle Hagel	Rockford IceHogs	1 year, $525,000
Brian Elliott	Colorado Avalanche	1 year, $600,000
Kent Huskins	San Jose Sharks	1 year, $1 million
Brett Sterling	Pittsburgh Penguins	1 year, $600,000
Scott Nichol	San Jose Sharks	1 year, $700,000
Jason Arnott	Washington Capitals	1 year, $2.875 million
Jamie Langenbrunner	Dallas Stars	1 year, $2.8 million
Jonathan Cheechoo	Worcester Sharks	1 year, $600,000
Danny Syvret	Philadelphia Flyers	1 year, $525,000

=== Free agents lost ===
Player	New team	Contract terms
Nicholas Drazenovic	Columbus Blue Jackets	1 year, $550,000
Nathan Oystrick	Phoenix Coyotes	1 year, $600,000
Dean Arsene	Phoenix Coyotes	1 year, $725,000
Tyson Strachan	Florida Panthers	1 year, $750,000
Graham Mink	Hershey Bears	1 year
Cam Janssen	New Jersey Devils	1 year, $525,000
Ty Conklin	Detroit Red Wings	1 year, $750,000

=== Claimed via Waivers ===
Player	Former team	Date claimed off waivers
Taylor Chorney	Edmonton Oilers	October 11, 2011

=== Lost via waivers ===
Player	New team	Date claimed off waivers
Taylor Chorney	Edmonton Oilers	November 10, 2011

=== Lost via retirement ===
Player	Date
Paul Kariya	June 29, 2011

=== Player signings ===
Player	Date	Contract terms
Patrik Berglund	May 31, 2011	2 years, $4.5 million
Roman Polak	June 2, 2011	5 years, $13.75 million
T. J. Hensick	June 6, 2011	2 years, $1.2 million
Nikita Nikitin	June 9, 2011	1 year, $600,000
Chris Porter	June 13, 2011	1 year, $600,000
Vladimir Sobotka	June 15, 2011	3 years, $3.9 million
Sebastian Wannstrom	June 16, 2011	3 years, $2.32 million entry-level contract
B. J. Crombeen	June 22, 2011	2 years, $2 million
T. J. Oshie	June 30, 2011	1 year, $2.35 million
Matt D'Agostini	July 1, 2011	2 years, $3.3 million
Cody Beach	July 1, 2011	3 years, $1.825 million entry-level contract
Adam Cracknell	July 1, 2011	1 year, $575,000
Ben Bishop	July 5, 2011	1 year, $800,000
Ryan Reaves	July 18, 2011	1 year, $525,000
Ryan Reaves	Jan. 9, 2012	2 years, $1.2 million contract extension
Brian Elliott	Jan. 18, 2012	2 years, $3.6 million contract extension
Jaden Schwartz	March 12, 2012	3 years, $2.49 million entry-level contract
Adam Cracknell	March 27, 2012	1 year, $550,000 contract extension
Paul Karpowich	April 20, 2012	2 years, $1.28 million entry-level contract
Jani Hakanpaa	May 21, 2012	3 years, $2.095 million entry-level contract
Jordan Binnington	May 29, 2012	3 years, $1.95 million entry-level contract
Ty Rattie	June 1, 2012	3 years, $2.41 million entry-level contract
Vladimir Tarasenko	June 2, 2012	3 years, $2.7 million entry-level contract

== Draft picks ==
St. Louis' picks at the 2011 NHL entry draft in Saint Paul, Minnesota, at the Xcel Energy Center from June 24–25, 2011.

The Blues had no first-round pick in the draft, because of the trade with the Colorado Avalanche during the 2010–2011 season.

Round	Pick	Player	Position	Nationality	Team (League)
2	32 (from Colorado)	Ty Rattie	RW	Canada	Portland Winterhawks (WHL)
2	41	Dmitrij Jaskin	RW	Czech Republic	Slavia Prague (Czech Extraliga)
2	46 (from Buffalo)	Joel Edmundson	D	Canada	Moose Jaw Warriors (WHL)
3	88 (from Tampa Bay)	Jordan Binnington	G	Canada	Owen Sound Attack (Ontario Hockey League)
4	102	Yannick Veilleux	LW	Canada	Shawinigan Cataractes (QMJHL)
5	132	Niklas Lundstrom	G	Sweden	AIK IF (Elitserien)
6	162	Ryan Tesink	C	Canada	Saint John Sea Dogs (QMJHL)
7	192	Teemu Eronen	D	Finland	Jokerit (SM-liiga)

== Farm teams ==
=== Peoria Rivermen ===
The Peoria Rivermen are the Blues American Hockey League affiliate in 2011–12.

=== Alaska Aces ===
The Alaska Aces are the Blues affiliate in the ECHL.

== See also ==
- 2011–12 NHL season
- St. Louis Blues seasons
- St. Louis (sports)
