= Grant Clitsome =

Canadian ice hockey player (born 1985)

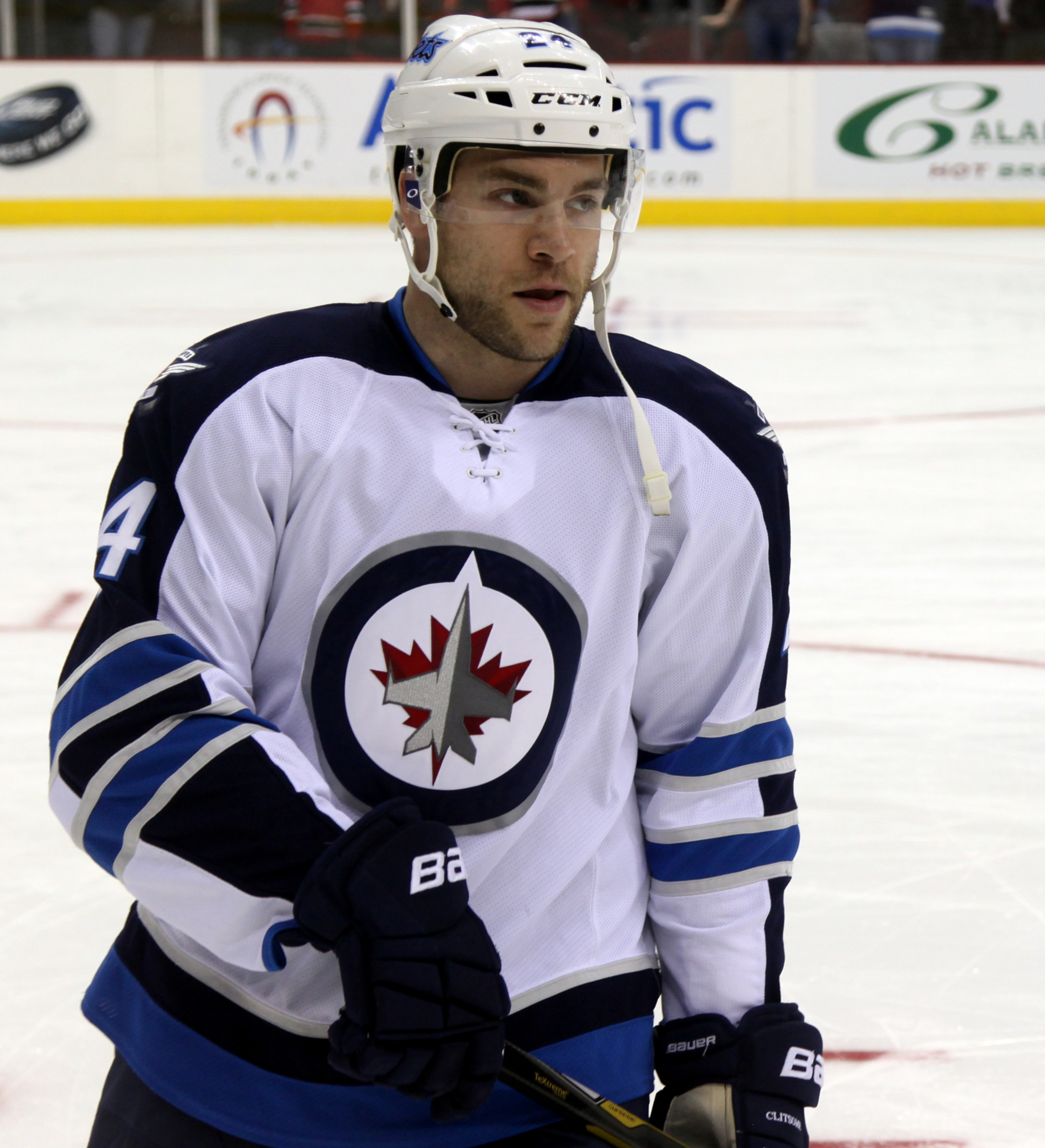
- Clitsome with the Winnipeg Jets in 2013
- Born: April 14, 1985 (age 41) Gloucester, Ontario, Canada
- Height: 5 ft 11 in (180 cm)
- Weight: 215 lb (98 kg; 15 st 5 lb)
- Position: Defence
- Shot: Left
- Played for: Columbus Blue Jackets; Winnipeg Jets
- NHL draft: 271st overall, 2004; Columbus Blue Jackets
- Playing career: 2008–2015

Grant Clitsome (born April 14, 1985) is a Canadian former professional ice hockey defenceman who played for the Columbus Blue Jackets and the Winnipeg Jets of the National Hockey League (NHL) from 2008 to 2016.

== Playing career ==
Clitsome was drafted in the ninth round, 271st overall, by the Columbus Blue Jackets in the 2004 NHL entry draft. He then committed to a four-year collegiate career with Clarkson University of the ECAC.

Clitsome made his NHL debut on March 2, 2010, providing two assists for the Blue Jackets and winning the game's third star in a 4-3 overtime loss to the Vancouver Canucks while on emergency call-up. His first NHL goal was scored on March 27, 2010 against Dwayne Roloson of the New York Islanders. On July 22, 2010, Grant re-signed as a restricted free agent with the Blue Jackets to a one-year contract.

On February 27, 2012, Clitsome was claimed off waivers by the Winnipeg Jets and later signed a three-year contract extension with the team on January 2, 2013. A serious injury in 2014 forced Clitsome to undergo back surgery in Los Angeles on Thursday, January 8, 2015. Clitsome did not play again following the surgery, missing the remainder of the 2014-15 season and the entire 2015-16 season. He announced his retirement from professional hockey on June 1, 2016.

== Career statistics ==
			Regular season					Playoffs
Season	Team	League	GP	G	A	Pts	PIM	GP	G	A	Pts	PIM
2001–02	Nepean Raiders	CJHL	43	1	6	7	20	1	0	0	0
2002–03	Nepean Raiders	CJHL	54	4	12	16	46	17	5	10	15	18
2003–04	Nepean Raiders	CJHL	55	13	26	39	67	17	1	10	11	6
2004–05	Clarkson University	ECAC	39	2	11	13	36	—	—	—	—	—
2005–06	Clarkson University	ECAC	34	2	17	19	20	—	—	—	—	—
2006–07	Clarkson University	ECAC	38	7	12	19	38	—	—	—	—	—
2007–08	Clarkson University	ECAC	39	5	17	22	28	—	—	—	—	—
2007–08	Syracuse Crunch	AHL	—	—	—	—	—	1	0	0	0	0
2008–09	Syracuse Crunch	AHL	73	4	15	19	74	—	—	—	—	—
2009–10	Syracuse Crunch	AHL	64	5	15	20	42	—	—	—	—	—
2009–10	Columbus Blue Jackets	NHL	11	1	2	3	6	—	—	—	—	—
2010–11	Springfield Falcons	AHL	32	5	10	15	22	—	—	—	—	—
2010–11	Columbus Blue Jackets	NHL	31	4	15	19	16	—	—	—	—	—
2011–12	Columbus Blue Jackets	NHL	51	4	10	14	24	—	—	—	—	—
2011–12	Winnipeg Jets	NHL	12	0	3	3	8	—	—	—	—	—
2012–13	Winnipeg Jets	NHL	44	4	12	16	18	—	—	—	—	—
2013–14	Winnipeg Jets	NHL	32	2	10	12	18	—	—	—	—	—
2014–15	Winnipeg Jets	NHL	24	0	4	4	8	—	—	—	—	—
NHL totals			205	15	56	71	98	—	—	—	—	—

== Awards and honours ==
Award	Year
CJHL 2nd team All-star	2004
National Junior A Championship - Most Sportsmanlike Player	2004
All-ECAC Hockey First Team	2008
ECAC Hockey All Academic Team	2008
NCAA East Regional Team	2008
AHCA East Second-Team All-American	2007-08
