= Dalton Prout =

Canadian ice hockey player (born 1990)

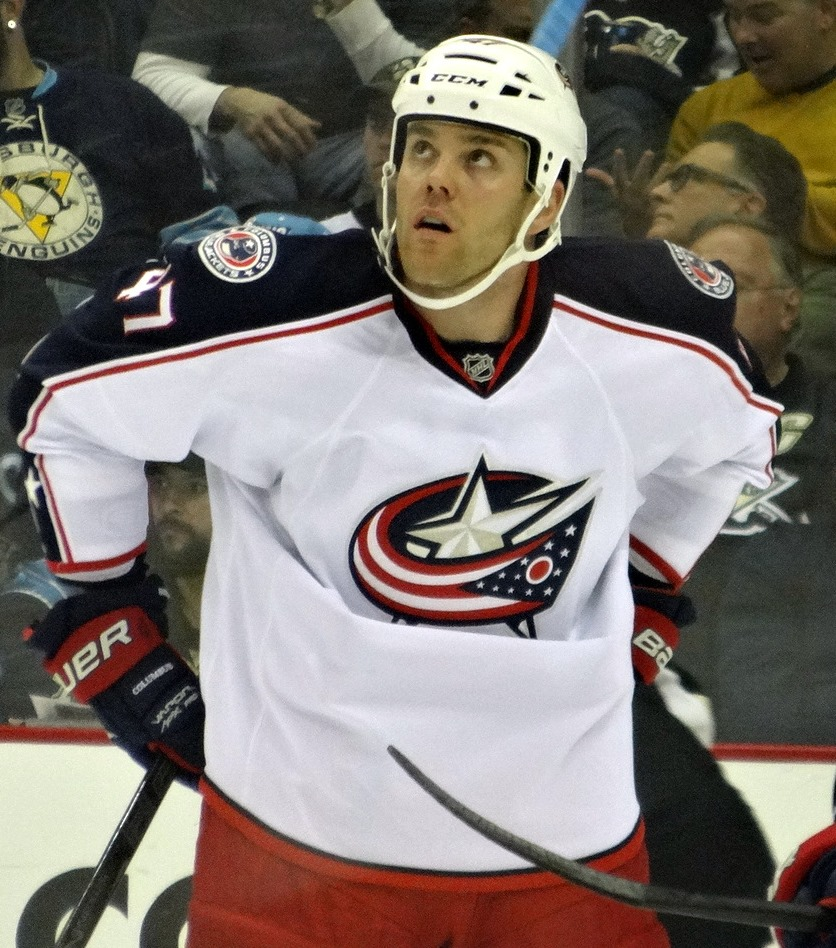
- Prout with the Columbus Blue Jackets in 2013
- Born: March 13, 1990 (age 36) Kingsville, Ontario, Canada
- Height: 6 ft 3 in (191 cm)
- Weight: 215 lb (98 kg; 15 st 5 lb)
- Position: Defence
- Shot: Right
- Played for: Columbus Blue Jackets; New Jersey Devils; Calgary Flames; San Jose Sharks
- NHL draft: 154th overall, 2010; Columbus Blue Jackets
- Playing career: 2011–2020

Dalton Prout (born March 13, 1990) is a Canadian former professional ice hockey defenceman, who spent the majority of his playing career with the Columbus Blue Jackets of the National Hockey League (NHL). He was selected 154th overall in the 2010 NHL entry draft by the Blue Jackets. He is currently a scout for the Florida Panthers.

== Playing career ==
Prout played junior hockey in the Ontario Hockey League with three teams. The Barrie Colts, Sarnia Sting and the Saginaw Spirit. On July 1, 2011, Prout was signed by the Blue Jackets to a three-year entry-level contract. Prout made his NHL debut March 30, 2012, vs the Florida Panthers.

Prout narrowly avoided a suspension after attacking Pittsburgh Penguins' player Sergei Plotnikov with his stick in a game on December 21, 2015. Later that season, on March 13, 2016, Prout attacked Tampa Bay Lightning forward Nikita Kucherov from the side with a sucker punch, receiving a two-minute minor for roughing and a game misconduct. He was subsequently summoned for a hearing with the NHL's Department of Player Safety for the incident. On March 15, 2016, the Department of Player Safety announced that Prout would be suspended for one game for delivering a punch to an unsuspecting opponent.

In the 2016–17 season, Prout's tenure in Columbus came to an end in his sixth season as he was dealt by the Blue Jackets on March 1, 2017, to the New Jersey Devils in exchange for Kyle Quincey. Prout played out the season with the Devils in appearing in 14 games for 3 assists.

Approaching the final year of his contract in the 2017–18 season, Prout played in 4 games before on December 29, 2017, he was assigned to the Devils' AHL affiliate, the Binghamton Devils, after clearing waivers. However, before he could report, Prout was traded by the Devils to the Calgary Flames in exchange for Eddie Lack on December 30.

On July 2, 2019, Prout signed as a free agent to a one-year, $800,000 contract with the San Jose Sharks. However, he suffered a concussion in the first game of the 2019–20 NHL season on October 2, 2019, and was unable to play for more than one month due to the injury. After a brief rehabilitation stint with the San Jose Barracuda of the American Hockey League, he suffered another concussion in his second game with the Sharks on November 14, 2019, during a fight with Nic Deslauriers of the Anaheim Ducks. Prout played one more rehab game with the Barracuda in February 2020 before being shut down for the remainder of the season due to continued effects from the concussions. He was medically cleared on October 2, 2020, exactly one year to the date of the original concussion, but was not re-signed by the Sharks. He never played another game.

== Post-playing career ==
For the 2021–22 NHL season, Prout joined the Florida Panthers organization as a professional scout.

== Career statistics ==
			Regular season					Playoffs
Season	Team	League	GP	G	A	Pts	PIM	GP	G	A	Pts	PIM
2006–07	Sarnia Sting	OHL	49	1	2	3	36	4	0	0	0	0
2007–08	Sarnia Sting	OHL	32	0	2	2	43	—	—	—	—	—
2007–08	Barrie Colts	OHL	25	0	3	3	39	8	0	2	2	16
2008–09	Barrie Colts	OHL	65	0	6	6	98	5	0	1	1	10
2009–10	Barrie Colts	OHL	63	7	14	21	121	17	1	6	7	20
2010–11	Barrie Colts	OHL	23	7	14	21	55	—	—	—	—	—
2010–11	Saginaw Spirit	OHL	29	2	8	10	46	12	2	0	2	27
2011–12	Springfield Falcons	AHL	62	4	9	13	54	—	—	—	—	—
2011–12	Columbus Blue Jackets	NHL	5	0	0	0	0	—	—	—	—	—
2012–13	Springfield Falcons	AHL	40	1	8	9	73	6	0	1	1	14
2012–13	Columbus Blue Jackets	NHL	28	1	6	7	25	—	—	—	—	—
2013–14	Columbus Blue Jackets	NHL	49	2	4	6	37	2	0	0	0	0
2013–14	Springfield Falcons	AHL	15	0	3	3	11	—	—	—	—	—
2014–15	Columbus Blue Jackets	NHL	63	0	8	8	85	—	—	—	—	—
2015–16	Columbus Blue Jackets	NHL	64	3	6	9	102	—	—	—	—	—
2016–17	Columbus Blue Jackets	NHL	15	0	3	3	14	—	—	—	—	—
2016–17	Cleveland Monsters	AHL	7	0	2	2	6	—	—	—	—	—
2016–17	New Jersey Devils	NHL	14	0	3	3	30	—	—	—	—	—
2017–18	New Jersey Devils	NHL	4	0	0	0	13	—	—	—	—	—
2017–18	Stockton Heat	AHL	34	2	7	9	42	—	—	—	—	—
2018–19	Calgary Flames	NHL	20	1	1	2	8	—	—	—	—	—
2018–19	Stockton Heat	AHL	4	1	2	3	8	—	—	—	—	—
2019–20	San Jose Barracuda	AHL	3	0	1	1	2	—	—	—	—	—
2019–20	San Jose Sharks	NHL	2	0	0	0	7	—	—	—	—	—
NHL totals			264	7	31	38	321	2	0	0	0	0
