= Nikita Nikitin =

Russian ice hockey player (born 1986)

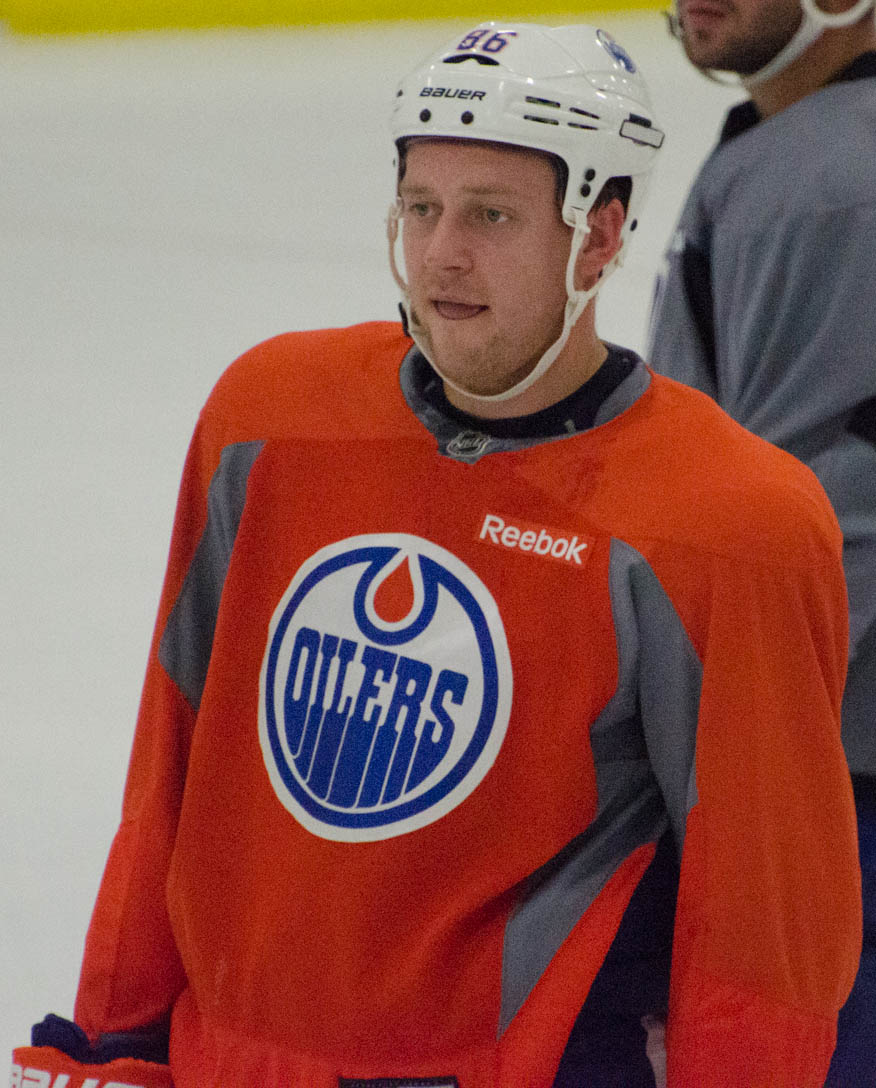
- Nikitin at the 2014 Edmonton Oilers training camp
- Born: 16 June 1986 (age 40) Omsk, Russian SFSR, URS
- Height: 6 ft 4 in (193 cm)
- Weight: 217 lb (98 kg; 15 st 7 lb)
- Position: Defence
- Shot: Left
- Played for: Avangard Omsk; St. Louis Blues; Columbus Blue Jackets; Edmonton Oilers; Traktor Chelyabinsk
- National team: Russia
- NHL draft: 136th overall, 2004; St. Louis Blues
- Playing career: 2002–2019

Nikita Aleksandrovich Nikitin (Russian: Никита Александрович Никитин; born 16 June 1986) is a Russian professional ice hockey defenseman who currently plays for Traktor Chelyabinsk in the Kontinental Hockey League (KHL). He formerly played in the National Hockey League (NHL) with the St. Louis Blues, Columbus Blue Jackets and Edmonton Oilers.

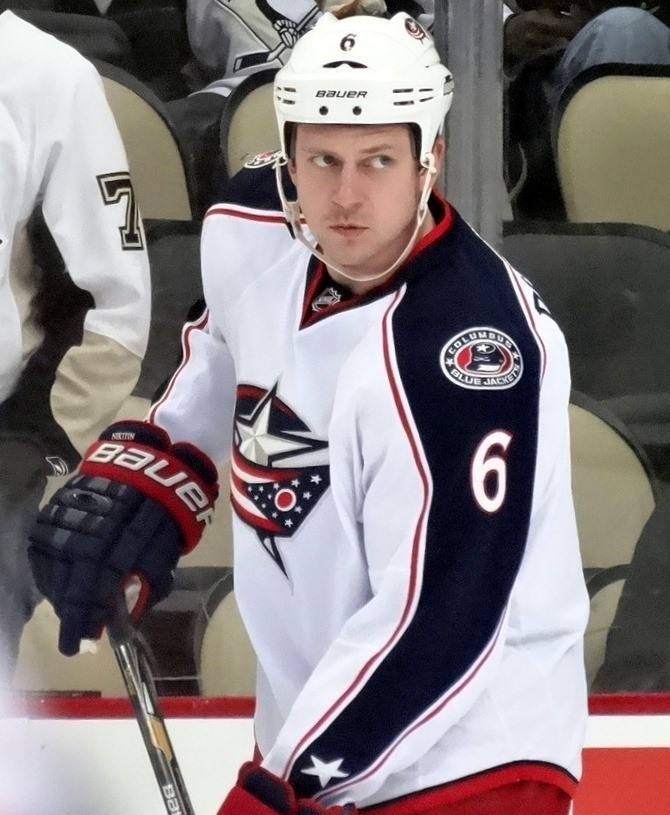
Nikitin with the Columbus Blue Jackets in 2013

== Playing career ==
Nikitin spent his junior career skating in the Avangard Omsk hockey system. He was a regular on Russia's under-18 and under-20 national squads and spent several seasons skating in the professional Russian Superleague (RSL) with Avangard, establishing himself as a strong Superleague-calibre defense-man.

Nikitin was drafted by the St. Louis Blues with the 136th overall selection in the 2004 NHL entry draft. On 14 June 2010, he was signed by the Blues to an entry-level NHL contract. He scored his first NHL goal on 6 February 2011 against Dan Ellis of the Tampa Bay Lightning. He was traded on 10 November 2011, to the Columbus Blue Jackets for defenceman Kris Russell.

After Columbus agreed to give the Edmonton Oilers permission to negotiate with Nikitin on 20 June 2014, Nikitin and Edmonton agreed to a two-year deal worth an annual average value of $4.5 million, and his rights were traded to Edmonton on 25 June, where he immediately signed the new contract.

Having returned to the KHL with Avangard Omsk for the 2016–17 season, Nikitin continued in Russia, joining his second KHL outfit in Traktor Chelyabinsk on October 3, 2017.

== Career statistics ==
=== Regular season and playoffs ===
| | | | Regular season | | | | | Playoffs |
| Season | Team | League | GP | G | A | Pts | PIM | GP | G | A | Pts | PIM |
|---|---|---|---|---|---|---|---|---|---|---|---|---|
| 2002–03 | Avangard–2 Omsk | RUS.3 | 34 | 3 | 7 | 10 | 4 | — | — | — | — | — |
| 2003–04 | Avangard–2 Omsk | RUS.3 | 56 | 5 | 9 | 14 | 54 | — | — | — | — | — |
| 2004–05 | Avangard–2 Omsk | RUS.3 | 33 | 3 | 9 | 12 | 20 | — | — | — | — | — |
| 2004–05 | Avangard Omsk | RSL | 12 | 0 | 0 | 0 | 2 | 3 | 0 | 0 | 0 | 0 |
| 2005–06 | Avangard–2 Omsk | RUS.3 | 1 | 0 | 0 | 0 | 0 | — | — | — | — | — |
| 2005–06 | Avangard Omsk | RSL | 43 | 1 | 2 | 3 | 22 | 13 | 1 | 2 | 3 | 6 |
| 2006–07 | Avangard Omsk | RSL | 54 | 1 | 15 | 16 | 99 | 11 | 0 | 4 | 4 | 39 |
| 2007–08 | Avangard Omsk | RSL | 57 | 3 | 11 | 14 | 48 | 4 | 0 | 1 | 1 | 2 |
| 2008–09 | Avangard Omsk | KHL | 53 | 4 | 11 | 15 | 28 | 9 | 1 | 2 | 3 | 8 |
| 2009–10 | Avangard Omsk | KHL | 43 | 4 | 9 | 13 | 14 | 3 | 0 | 0 | 0 | 0 |
| 2010–11 | St. Louis Blues | NHL | 41 | 1 | 8 | 9 | 10 | — | — | — | — | — |
| 2010–11 | Peoria Rivermen | AHL | 22 | 3 | 11 | 14 | 12 | — | — | — | — | — |
| 2011–12 | St. Louis Blues | NHL | 7 | 0 | 0 | 0 | 4 | — | — | — | — | — |
| 2011–12 | Columbus Blue Jackets | NHL | 54 | 7 | 25 | 32 | 14 | — | — | — | — | — |
| 2012–13 | Avangard Omsk | KHL | 33 | 2 | 12 | 14 | 8 | — | — | — | — | — |
| 2012–13 | Columbus Blue Jackets | NHL | 38 | 3 | 6 | 9 | 17 | — | — | — | — | — |
| 2013–14 | Columbus Blue Jackets | NHL | 66 | 2 | 13 | 15 | 20 | 5 | 0 | 0 | 0 | 0 |
| 2014–15 | Edmonton Oilers | NHL | 42 | 4 | 6 | 10 | 12 | — | — | — | — | — |
| 2015–16 | Bakersfield Condors | AHL | 30 | 1 | 13 | 14 | 0 | — | — | — | — | — |
| 2015–16 | Edmonton Oilers | NHL | 11 | 0 | 1 | 1 | 8 | — | — | — | — | — |
| 2016–17 | Avangard Omsk | KHL | 47 | 3 | 3 | 6 | 16 | 4 | 0 | 1 | 1 | 2 |
| 2017–18 | Traktor Chelyabinsk | KHL | 33 | 0 | 4 | 4 | 20 | 3 | 0 | 2 | 2 | 14 |
| 2018–19 | Traktor Chelyabinsk | KHL | 28 | 2 | 1 | 3 | 29 | — | — | — | — | — |
| RSL totals | | | 166 | 5 | 28 | 33 | 171 | 31 | 1 | 7 | 8 | 47 |
| KHL totals | | | 237 | 15 | 40 | 55 | 115 | 19 | 1 | 5 | 6 | 24 |
| NHL totals | | | 259 | 17 | 59 | 76 | 85 | 5 | 0 | 0 | 0 | 0 |

=== International ===
| Year | Team | Event | Result | GP | G | A | Pts | PIM |
|---|---|---|---|---|---|---|---|---|
| 2006 | Russia | WJC | 2nd place, silver medalist(s) | 6 | 0 | 0 | 0 | 6 |
| 2012 | Russia | WC | 1st place, gold medalist(s) | 10 | 0 | 4 | 4 | 4 |
| 2014 | Russia | OG | 5th | 5 | 0 | 1 | 1 | 0 |
| Junior totals | | | | 6 | 0 | 0 | 0 | 6 |
| Senior totals | | | | 15 | 0 | 5 | 5 | 4 |
