= 2011–12 Vancouver Canucks season =

NHL hockey team season

2011–12 Vancouver Canucks
- Presidents' Trophy winners
- Northwest Division champions
- Division: 1st Northwest
- Conference: 1st Western
- 2011–12 record: 51–22–9
- Home record: 27–10–4
- Road record: 24–12–5
- Goals for: 249
- Goals against: 198

Team information
- General manager: Mike Gillis
- Coach: Alain Vigneault
- Captain: Henrik Sedin
- Alternate captains: Kevin Bieksa; Ryan Kesler; Manny Malhotra; Daniel Sedin
- Arena: Rogers Arena
- Average attendance: 18,884 (102.5%)
- Minor league affiliates: Chicago Wolves (AHL); Kalamazoo Wings (ECHL)

Team leaders
- Goals: Daniel Sedin (30)
- Assists: Henrik Sedin (67)
- Points: Henrik Sedin (81)
- Penalty minutes: Maxim Lapierre (130)
- Plus/minus: Dan Hamhuis (+29)
- Wins: Roberto Luongo (31)
- Goals against average: Cory Schneider (1.96)

The 2011–12 Vancouver Canucks season was the 42nd season in the modern Canucks history. The Vancouver Canucks were the defending Western Conference champions and three time defending Northwest Division champions. The Canucks opened the regular season against the Pittsburgh Penguins at home on October 6, 2011. Their final regular season game was held at Rogers Arena against the Edmonton Oilers on April 7, 2012.

The Canucks entered the season expected to again contend for their first ever Stanley Cup after coming one win short from winning it the previous season and maintaining the majority of the players from the previous season on the roster. The Canucks struggled out of the gate, hovering around .500 until roughly the 20-game mark due to weak defensive play and a slow start from starting goaltender Roberto Luongo. The Canucks then recovered by the 20th game on November 20 against the Ottawa Senators (where they defeated the Senators 2–1) and would go on to play their best hockey of the season from that day until the end of February. The team dominated much like they did the season prior during this stretch from late-November to late-February, as goals came in bunches and the offense was backed up by strong goaltending from the tandem of Luongo and backup goaltender Cory Schneider. The peak of the Canucks' season came on January 7, 2012, in the 42nd game of the season which came against the Boston Bruins, a rematch of the 2011 Stanley Cup Finals. The Canucks prevailed 4–3 in a fight-filled game with a hard-fought playoff atmosphere, and they seemed to state to the hockey world that they would be heard from again come playoff time if they were to meet in the Stanley Cup Finals again. Despite their continuation of winning lengthy stretches of games within the last several weeks from early-March to early-April, the team did not play with the same heart they played with earlier in the season as they often played down to their competition by barely beating some of the weakest teams in the league and even lost games they had little business losing as the offense seemed to disappear and the team was lucky to have maintained outstanding goaltending and defense that kept them in games and eventually leading them to their second consecutive Presidents' Trophy and second Presidents' Trophy in franchise history altogether on the final day of the season on April 7, when they defeated the Edmonton Oilers 3–0 and the top seeded Eastern Conference team New York Rangers lost their season finale the same day 4–1 against the Washington Capitals, ending their season with 109 points in the standings, two points behind the Canucks 111 points. Despite entering the 2012 playoffs as the top seed in the Western Conference for the second year in a row and the back-to-back Presidents' Trophy winners, the Canucks were upset in the first round in five games by the eight-seeded Los Angeles Kings, who would eventually go on to win their first Stanley Cup in franchise history as the weeks went on, making them the first, and so far only team to do so. This marked the third consecutive season and fourth time in six seasons where the Canucks lost a playoff series to an eventual Stanley Cup champion.

== Off-season ==
=== NHL entry draft ===
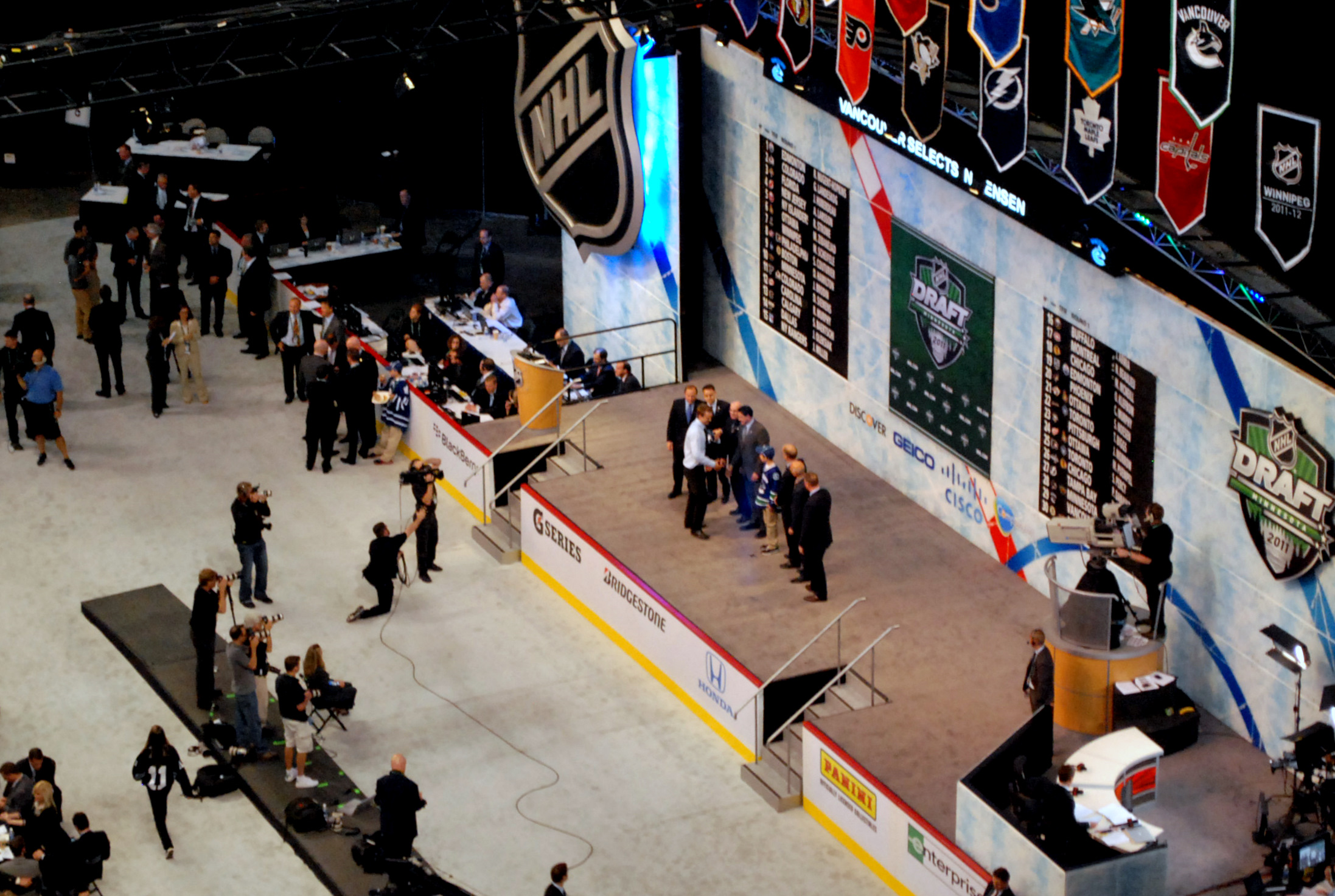
Nicklas Jensen on stage after being selected 29th overall in the 2011 NHL Entry Draft

The 2011 NHL entry draft was held June 24–25, 2011, at the Xcel Energy Center in Saint Paul, Minnesota. The Canucks selected eight players including Nicklas Jensen with their first-round draft choice, 29th overall. On day two of the entry draft the Vancouver Canucks traded their second-round draft choice to the Minnesota Wild for two picks in later rounds. In total, Vancouver selected eight players including David Honzík, Alexandre Grenier, Joseph LaBate, Ludwig Blomstrand, Frank Corrado, Pathrik Westerholm and Henrik Tommernes. In total, none would become regular NHL players, with Corrado playing the most games with 76 appearances across three teams.

=== Minor League affiliations ===
On June 21, 2011, True North Sports & Entertainment, the owners of the Manitoba Moose received Board of Governors approval to purchase and re-locate the Atlanta Thrashers. The Thrashers moved to Winnipeg, Manitoba to replace the Manitoba Moose. The Moose announced that they were moving to St. John's and would become the AHL affiliate of the Winnipeg Jets. As a result, the Canucks were left without an affiliate temporarily. On June 27, 2011, the Vancouver Canucks signed a two-year affiliation agreement with the Chicago Wolves. The Vancouver Canucks announced that Craig MacTavish would be the new coach for the Wolves on August 1 after Claude Noel, who coached the Manitoba Moose during the 2010–11 season, was hired by the Jets.

In addition, on April 8, 2011, it was announced that the Chilliwack Bruins of the Western Hockey League would be moving their franchise to Victoria, British Columbia. The sale of the Chilliwack Bruins to RG Properties was completed and made official on April 20 by the WHL. The Victoria Royals replaced the Victoria Salmon Kings and began play in the 2011–12 WHL season. RG Properties, who also owned the Victoria Salmon Kings, opted to fold the Salmon Kings franchise at the conclusion of the 2010–11 ECHL season. As a result, the Canucks were left without an ECHL minor league affiliate. The Salmon Kings spent five years as the ECHL affiliate of the Vancouver Canucks.

On September 22, the Vancouver Canucks announced that it had signed an ECHL affiliation agreement with the Kalamazoo Wings.

== Preseason ==
Training camp began for the rookies on September 9 and included two days of on-ice training sessions followed by a four-game Young Stars tournament featuring prospects from other teams including the Calgary Flames, Edmonton Oilers, San Jose Sharks and Winnipeg Jets. Among the players were four that were selected from the 2011 Entry Draft. Nicklas Jensen, David Honzik, Alexandre Grenier and Frank Corrado all took part in the Canucks rookie training camp and Young Stars tournament. LaBate did not participate in the camp because his college semester had begun while Blomstrand, Westerholm and Tommernes were in the midst of training camp for their own Swedish hockey clubs.

The Vancouver Canucks main training camp started on September 16. Several veteran NHL players were invited to the camp on a try-out basis. These players included Owen Nolan, Anders Eriksson, Niko Dimitrakos and Todd Fedoruk. However, none of the invites were able to secure a contract with the club.

The Canucks played a total of eight preseason games where they finished with a record of 3–5. Much of the Vancouver Canucks roster were returning members from the 2010–11 season with the exception of Christian Ehrhoff and Raffi Torres, who both changed teams, through trade and free agency respectively, during the off-season.

Citing the shortened off-season due to their appearance in the Stanley Cup Finals, the Vancouver Canucks management and coaching staff decided to give a majority of the veterans rest. As a result, players guaranteed roster spots in the regular season, such as Daniel and Henrik Sedin only played in two preseason games.

== Regular season ==
Like 2010–11, the Canucks were met with extremely high expectations for the upcoming season. They entered 2011–12 as the defending Presidents' Trophy and Western Conference champions. It was a record setting season that saw them rank first in the league in goals per game, goals against per game and power play percentage. Both Roberto Luongo and Cory Schneider were awarded the William M. Jennings Trophy for lowest goals against.

General consensus through various sports media outlets such as The Hockey News, Sports Illustrated, TSN and Sportsnet predicted that the Canucks would return to the Western Conference Finals or at least finish first in the Western Conference regular season.

=== October–November ===
Helmet decal worn by the Vancouver Canucks team throughout the season

The Vancouver Canucks began their season on October 6 when they hosted the Pittsburgh Penguins before embarking on a four-game road trip. Prior to the start of the home opener the Canucks organization held a ceremony to celebrate their 2010–11 season and to thank the police officers, firemen and volunteers who helped the city recover after the Stanley Cup riot. The game was supposed to be Sidney Crosby's third NHL game at Rogers Arena, and first hockey game since scoring the golden goal at the 2010 Winter Olympics but was unable to play as he was still recovering from a concussion. In the game, the Vancouver Canucks battled back from a 3–1 deficit but fell short in a shootout.

The club held a ceremony on October 18 prior to their game against the New York Rangers to honour the late Rick Rypien. Rypien played within the Vancouver Canucks organization for seven seasons, splitting time between the Canucks and the Manitoba Moose, before signing with the Winnipeg Jets during the summer. Rypien was found dead at his home in Crowsnest Pass, Alberta, on August 15. The Canucks wore a helmet decal in honour of Rypien during the season. The Canucks also ran a video tribute for former Ranger Derek Boogaard who also died during the off-season.

The Canucks struggled throughout the month of October which was punctuated by a significant trade. Mikael Samuelsson and Marco Sturm were traded to the Florida Panthers on October 22, just hours after the Canucks defeated the Minnesota Wild. In return, the Canucks acquired a third-round draft pick in the 2013 NHL entry draft and forwards David Booth and Steven Reinprecht. The month ended with a match up against the Washington Capitals that saw the Canucks prevail by a final score of 7–4. Alex Edler, Maxim Lapierre and Chris Higgins all registered two goals for Vancouver while Alexander Ovechkin also scored a pair of goals for Washington.

The month of November opened with a six-game road trip beginning in Calgary, where the Canucks won the game by a score of 5–1. The game saw Daniel Sedin score his 254th goal of his career to tie Pavel Bure for fourth all-time in Canucks goal scoring. However, the Canucks continued to battle inconsistency and were unable to sustain any momentum through the first two-thirds of the month where they compiled a record of 4–4 capped by a blowout loss to rival Chicago. The Canucks, led by Cory Schneider who originally replaced an injured Roberto Luongo, finished the month with five consecutive victories that included back-to-back shutouts for Schneider. During the winning streak head coach Alain Vigneault became the team's winningest coach when the team defeated Colorado on November 23.

== Standings ==
=== Divisional standings ===
Northwest Division
Pos	Team	GP	W	L	OTL	ROW	GF	GA	GD	Pts
1	p – Vancouver Canucks	82	51	22	9	43	249	198	+51	111
2	Calgary Flames	82	37	29	16	34	202	226	−24	90
3	Colorado Avalanche	82	41	35	6	32	208	220	−12	88
4	Minnesota Wild	82	35	36	11	24	177	226	−49	81
5	Edmonton Oilers	82	32	40	10	27	212	239	−27	74

Source: National Hockey League
p – Clinched Presidents' Trophy

=== Conference standings ===
Western Conference
Pos	Div	Team	GP	W	L	OTL	ROW	GF	GA	GD	Pts
1	NW	p – Vancouver Canucks	82	51	22	9	43	249	198	+51	111
2	CE	y – St. Louis Blues	82	49	22	11	45	210	165	+45	109
3	PA	y – Phoenix Coyotes	82	42	27	13	36	216	204	+12	97
4	CE	x – Nashville Predators	82	48	26	8	43	237	210	+27	104
5	CE	x – Detroit Red Wings	82	48	28	6	39	248	203	+45	102
6	CE	x – Chicago Blackhawks	82	45	26	11	38	248	238	+10	101
7	PA	x – San Jose Sharks	82	43	29	10	34	228	210	+18	96
8	PA	x – Los Angeles Kings	82	40	27	15	34	194	179	+15	95
9	NW	Calgary Flames	82	37	29	16	34	202	226	−24	90
10	PA	Dallas Stars	82	42	35	5	35	211	222	−11	89
11	NW	Colorado Avalanche	82	41	35	6	32	208	220	−12	88
12	NW	Minnesota Wild	82	35	36	11	24	177	226	−49	81
13	PA	Anaheim Ducks	82	34	36	12	31	204	231	−27	80
14	NW	Edmonton Oilers	82	32	40	10	27	212	239	−27	74
15	CE	Columbus Blue Jackets	82	29	46	7	25	202	262	−60	65

Source: National Hockey League
p – Clinched Presidents' Trophy; x – Clinched playoff spot; y – Clinched division

== Schedule and results ==
=== Pre-season ===
2011 pre-season game log: 3–5–0 (Home: 2–2–0; Road: 1–3–0)
#	Date	Visitor	Score	Home	OT	Decision	Attendance	Record	Recap
1	September 20	Vancouver	1–5	Calgary		Legace	19,289	0–1–0	Recap
2	September 20	Calgary	3–4	Vancouver		Lack	18,860	1–1–0	Recap
3	September 22	Vancouver	2–1	Edmonton		Lack	15,724	2–1–0	Recap
4	September 24	Anaheim	4–1	Vancouver		Schneider	18,860	2–2–0	Recap
5	September 25	San Jose	4–3	Vancouver		Lack	18,860	2–3–0	Recap
6	September 28	Vancouver	2–3	Anaheim		Luongo	13,542	2–4–0	Recap
7	September 29	Vancouver	0–3	San Jose		Schneider	16,347	2–5–0	Recap
8	October 1	Edmonton	1–4	Vancouver		Luongo	18,860	3–5–0	Recap

=== Regular season ===
2011–12 game log

October: 5–5–1 (Home: 3–2–1; Road: 2–3–0)
#	Date	Visitor	Score	Home	OT	Decision	Attendance	Record	Pts	Recap
1	October 6	Pittsburgh	4–3	Vancouver	SO	Luongo	18,860	0–0–1	1	Recap
2	October 10	Vancouver	3–2	Columbus		Schneider	9,187	1–0–1	3	Recap
3	October 12	Vancouver	4–5	Philadelphia		Luongo	19,632	1–1–1	3	Recap
4	October 13	Vancouver	0–2	Detroit		Schneider	20,066	1–2–1	3	Recap
5	October 15	Vancouver	4–3	Edmonton		Luongo	16,839	2–2–1	5	Recap
6	October 18	NY Rangers	4–0	Vancouver		Luongo	18,860	2–3–1	5	Recap
7	October 20	Nashville	1–5	Vancouver		Luongo	18,860	3–3–1	7	Recap
8	October 22	Minnesota	2–3	Vancouver	OT	Schneider	18,860	4–3–1	9	Recap
9	October 25	Vancouver	2–3	Edmonton		Luongo	16,839	4–4–1	9	Recap
10	October 26	St. Louis	3–0	Vancouver		Schneider	18,860	4–5–1	9	Recap
11	October 29	Washington	4–7	Vancouver		Luongo	18,860	5–5–1	11	Recap

November: 9–4–0 (Home: 3–1–0; Road: 6–3–0)
#	Date	Visitor	Score	Home	OT	Decision	Attendance	Record	Pts	Recap
12	November 1	Vancouver	5–1	Calgary		Luongo	19,289	6–5–1	13	Recap
13	November 3	Vancouver	1–5	Minnesota		Schneider	16,534	6–6–1	13	Recap
14	November 4	Vancouver	2–3	St. Louis		Luongo	19,150	6–7–1	13	Recap
15	November 6	Vancouver	6–2	Chicago		Luongo	21,883	7–7–1	15	Recap
16	November 10	Vancouver	3–2	Los Angeles		Luongo	18,118	8–7–1	17	Recap
17	November 11	Vancouver	3–4	Anaheim		Luongo	17,339	8–8–1	17	Recap
18	November 13	NY Islanders	1–4	Vancouver		Luongo	18,860	9–8–1	19	Recap
19	November 16	Chicago	5–1	Vancouver		Schneider	18,860	9–9–1	19	Recap
20	November 20	Ottawa	1–2	Vancouver	OT	Schneider	18,890	10–9–1	21	Recap
21	November 23	Vancouver	3–0	Colorado		Schneider	15,538	11–9–1	23	Recap
22	November 25	Vancouver	5–0	Phoenix		Schneider	14,569	12–9–1	25	Recap
23	November 26	Vancouver	3–2	San Jose		Schneider	17,562	13–9–1	27	Recap
24	November 29	Columbus	1–4	Vancouver		Schneider	18,890	14–9–1	29	Recap

December: 10–4–1 (Home: 5–2–0; Road: 5–2–1)
#	Date	Visitor	Score	Home	OT	Decision	Attendance	Record	Pts	Recap
25	December 1	Nashville	6–5	Vancouver		Luongo	18,890	14–10–1	29	Recap
26	December 4	Calgary	1–5	Vancouver		Luongo	18,890	15–10–1	31	Recap
27	December 6	Colorado	0–6	Vancouver		Luongo	18,890	16–10–1	33	Recap
28	December 8	Vancouver	4–3	Montreal	SO	Luongo	21,273	17–10–1	35	Recap
29	December 10	Vancouver	4–1	Ottawa		Luongo	19,171	18–10–1	37	Recap
30	December 13	Vancouver	1–2	Columbus	SO	Luongo	15,808	18–10–2	38	Recap
31	December 15	Vancouver	3–4	Carolina		Schneider	15,292	18–11–2	38	Recap
32	December 17	Vancouver	5–3	Toronto		Luongo	19,633	19–11–2	40	Recap
33	December 19	Minnesota	0–4	Vancouver		Luongo	18,890	20–11–2	42	Recap
34	December 21	Detroit	2–4	Vancouver		Luongo	18,890	21–11–2	44	Recap
35	December 23	Calgary	3–1	Vancouver		Luongo	18,890	21–12–2	44	Recap
36	December 26	Edmonton	3–5	Vancouver		Luongo	18,890	22–12–2	46	Recap
37	December 28	Vancouver	3–2	San Jose	OT	Luongo	17,562	23–12–2	48	Recap
38	December 29	Vancouver	5–2	Anaheim		Schneider	17,544	24–12–2	50	Recap
39	December 31	Vancouver	1–4	Los Angeles		Luongo	18,118	24–13–2	50	Recap

January: 7–2–2 (Home: 4–1–2; Road: 3–1–0)
#	Date	Visitor	Score	Home	OT	Decision	Attendance	Record	Pts	Recap
40	January 2	San Jose	3–2	Vancouver	SO	Luongo	18,890	24–13–3	51	Recap
41	January 4	Minnesota	0–3	Vancouver		Luongo	18,890	25–13–3	53	Recap
42	January 7	Vancouver	4–3	Boston		Schneider	17,565	26–13–3	55	Recap
43	January 9	Vancouver	1–2	Florida		Luongo	16,712	26–14–3	55	Recap
44	January 10	Vancouver	5–4	Tampa Bay	SO	Schneider	17,630	27–14–3	57	Recap
45	January 12	Vancouver	3–2	St. Louis	OT	Luongo	18,231	28–14–3	59	Recap
46	January 15	Anaheim	4–2	Vancouver		Luongo	18,890	28–15–3	59	Recap
47	January 17	Los Angeles	3–2	Vancouver	SO	Luongo	18,890	28–15–4	60	Recap
48	January 21	San Jose	3–4	Vancouver		Luongo	18,890	29–15–4	62	Recap
49	January 24	Edmonton	2–3	Vancouver	SO	Luongo	18,890	30–15–4	64	Recap
50	January 31	Chicago	2–3	Vancouver	OT	Schneider	18,890	31–15–4	66	Recap

February: 9–1–4 (Home: 3–0–1; Road: 6–1–3)
#	Date	Visitor	Score	Home	OT	Decision	Attendance	Record	Pts	Recap
51	February 2	Detroit	4–3	Vancouver	SO	Luongo	18,890	31–15–5	67	Recap
52	February 4	Vancouver	3–2	Colorado	SO	Luongo	17,024	32–15–5	69	Recap
53	February 7	Vancouver	4–3	Nashville	SO	Luongo	16,232	33–15–5	71	Recap
54	February 9	Vancouver	5–2	Minnesota		Schneider	17,859	34–15–5	73	Recap
55	February 11	Vancouver	2–3	Calgary	SO	Luongo	19,289	34–15–6	74	Recap
56	February 13	Phoenix	1–2	Vancouver	SO	Luongo	18,890	35–15–6	76	Recap
57	February 15	Colorado	1–3	Vancouver		Luongo	18,890	36–15–6	78	Recap
58	February 18	Toronto	2–6	Vancouver		Luongo	18,890	37–15–6	80	Recap
59	February 19	Vancouver	5–2	Edmonton		Schneider	16,839	38–15–6	82	Recap
60	February 21	Vancouver	1–3	Nashville		Luongo	16,769	38–16–6	82	Recap
61	February 23	Vancouver	4–3	Detroit	SO	Luongo	20,066	39–16–6	84	Recap
62	February 24	Vancouver	2–1	New Jersey		Schneider	16,480	40–16–6	86	Recap
63	February 26	Vancouver	2–3	Dallas	OT	Luongo	18,010	40–16–7	87	Recap
64	February 28	Vancouver	1–2	Phoenix	SO	Schneider	16,691	40–16–8	88	Recap

March: 9–5–1 (Home: 7–4–0; Road: 2–1–1)
#	Date	Visitor	Score	Home	OT	Decision	Attendance	Record	Pts	Recap
65	March 1	St. Louis	0–2	Vancouver		Luongo	18,890	41–16–8	90	Recap
66	March 3	Buffalo	5–3	Vancouver		Schneider	18,890	41–17–8	90	Recap
67	March 6	Dallas	5–2	Vancouver		Luongo	18,890	41–18–8	90	Recap
68	March 8	Winnipeg	2–3	Vancouver		Schneider	18,890	42–18–8	92	Recap
69	March 10	Montreal	4–1	Vancouver		Luongo	18,890	42–19–8	92	Recap
70	March 14	Phoenix	5–4	Vancouver		Luongo	18,890	42–20–8	92	Recap
71	March 17	Columbus	3–4	Vancouver		Schneider	18,890	43–20–8	94	Recap
72	March 19	Vancouver	0–2	Minnesota		Schneider	17,859	43–21–8	94	Recap
73	March 21	Vancouver	1–2	Chicago	OT	Luongo	21,883	43–21–9	95	Recap
74	March 22	Vancouver	2–1	Dallas		Schneider	16,618	44–21–9	97	Recap
75	March 24	Vancouver	3–2	Colorado	OT	Luongo	18,007	45–21–9	99	Recap
76	March 26	Los Angeles	0–1	Vancouver		Luongo	18,890	46–21–9	101	Recap
77	March 28	Colorado	0–1	Vancouver		Schneider	18,890	47–21–9	103	Recap
78	March 30	Dallas	2–5	Vancouver		Schneider	18,890	48–21–9	105	Recap
79	March 31	Calgary	2–3	Vancouver	OT	Luongo	18,890	49–21–9	107	Recap

April: 2–1–0 (Home: 2–0–0; Road: 0–1–0)
#	Date	Visitor	Score	Home	OT	Decision	Attendance	Record	Pts	Recap
80	April 3	Anaheim	4–5	Vancouver	SO	Schneider	18,890	50–21–9	109	Recap
81	April 5	Vancouver	2–3	Calgary		Schneider	19,289	50–22–9	109	Recap
82	April 7	Edmonton	0–3	Vancouver		Luongo	18,890	51–22–9	111	Recap

Legend: Win (2 points) Loss (0 points) Overtime/shootout loss (1 point)

=== Detailed records ===
Eastern Conference
Opponent	Home	Away	Total	Pts.	Goals scored	Goals allowed
Atlantic Division
New Jersey Devils	0–0–0	1–0–0	1–0–0	2	2	1
New York Islanders	1–0–0	0–0–0	1–0–0	2	4	1
New York Rangers	0–1–0	0–0–0	0–1–0	0	0	4
Philadelphia Flyers	0–0–0	0–1–0	0–1–0	0	4	5
Pittsburgh Penguins	0–0–1	0–0–0	0–0–1	1	3	4
	1–1–1	1–1–0	2–2–1	5	13	15
Northeast Division
Boston Bruins	0–0–0	1–0–0	1–0–0	2	4	3
Buffalo Sabres	0–1–0	0–0–0	0–1–0	0	3	5
Montreal Canadiens	0–1–0	1–0–0	1–1–0	2	5	7
Ottawa Senators	1–0–0	1–0–0	2–0–0	4	6	2
Toronto Maple Leafs	1–0–0	1–0–0	2–0–0	4	11	5
	2–2–0	4–0–0	6–2–0	12	29	22
Southeast Division
Carolina Hurricanes	0–0–0	0–1–0	0–1–0	0	3	4
Florida Panthers	0–0–0	0–1–0	0–1–0	0	1	2
Tampa Bay Lightning	0–0–0	1–0–0	1–0–0	2	5	4
Washington Capitals	1–0–0	0–0–0	1–0–0	2	7	4
Winnipeg Jets	1–0–0	0–0–0	1–0–0	2	3	2
	2–0–0	1–2–0	3–2–0	6	19	16

Western Conference
Opponent	Home	Away	Total	Pts.	Goals scored	Goals allowed
Central Division
Chicago Blackhawks	1–1–0	1–0–1	2–1–1	5	11	11
Columbus Blue Jackets	2–0–0	1–0–1	3–0–1	7	12	8
Detroit Red Wings	1–0–1	1–1–0	2–1–1	5	11	11
Nashville Predators	1–1–0	1–1–0	2–2–0	4	15	13
St. Louis Blues	1–1–0	1–1–0	2–2–0	4	7	8
	6–3–1	5–3–2	11–6–3	25	56	51
Northwest Division
Calgary Flames	2–1–0	1–1–1	3–2–1	7	18	13
Colorado Avalanche	3–0–0	3–0–0	6–0–0	12	19	5
Edmonton Oilers	3–0–0	2–1–0	5–1–0	10	22	13
Minnesota Wild	3–0–0	1–2–0	4–2–0	8	16	11
Vancouver Canucks	–	–	–	–	–	–
	11–1–0	7–4–1	18–5–1	37	75	42
Pacific Division
Anaheim Ducks	1–1–0	1–1–0	2–2–0	4	15	14
Dallas Stars	1–1–0	1–0–1	2–1–1	5	11	11
Los Angeles Kings	1–0–1	1–1–0	2–1–1	5	7	9
Phoenix Coyotes	1–1–0	1–0–1	2–1–1	5	12	8
San Jose Sharks	1–0–1	2–0–0	3–0–1	7	12	10
	5–3–2	6–2–2	11–5–4	26	57	52

=== Playoffs ===
The Vancouver Canucks clinched the Presidents' Trophy for the second consecutive year and second time in franchise history, thus guaranteeing themselves home ice advantage for the duration of the playoffs regardless of how far they were to go. However, they were knocked out in the first round by the eighth-seeded and eventual Stanley Cup champion Los Angeles Kings.

2012 Stanley Cup playoffs

Western Conference Quarterfinal vs. (8) Los Angeles Kings: Los Angeles won series 4–1
#	Date	Visitor	Score	Home	OT	Decision	Attendance	Series	Recap
1	April 11	Los Angeles	4–2	Vancouver		Luongo	18,890	0–1	Recap
2	April 13	Los Angeles	4–2	Vancouver		Luongo	18,890	0–2	Recap
3	April 15	Vancouver	0–1	Los Angeles		Schneider	18,118	0–3	Recap
4	April 18	Vancouver	3–1	Los Angeles		Schneider	18,409	1–3	Recap
5	April 22	Los Angeles	2–1	Vancouver	OT	Schneider	18,890	1–4	Recap

Legend: Win Loss

== Player statistics ==
=== Skaters ===
Note: GP = Games played; G = Goals; A = Assists; Pts = Points; +/− = Plus/minus; PIM = Penalty minutes

Regular season

Player	GP	G	A	Pts	+/−	PIM
Henrik Sedin	82	14	67	81	+23	52
Daniel Sedin	72	30	37	67	+14	40
Alex Burrows	80	28	24	52	+24	90
Alexander Edler	82	11	38	49	0	34
Ryan Kesler	77	22	27	49	+11	56
Kevin Bieksa	78	8	36	44	+12	94
Chris Higgins	71	18	25	43	+11	16
Jannik Hansen	82	16	23	39	+18	34
Dan Hamhuis	82	4	33	37	+29	46
Cody Hodgson^{‡}	61	16	17	33	+10	8
David Booth^{†}	56	16	13	29	+1	32
Sami Salo	69	9	16	25	+7	10
Mason Raymond	55	10	10	20	+4	18
Maxim Lapierre	82	9	10	19	−3	130
Manny Malhotra	78	7	11	18	−11	14
Aaron Rome	43	4	6	10	−4	46
Dale Weise	68	4	4	8	−1	81
Keith Ballard	47	1	6	7	0	64
Andrew Ebbett	18	5	1	6	+2	6
Samuel Pahlsson^{†}	19	2	4	6	+4	12
Byron Bitz	10	1	3	4	+2	14
Andrew Alberts	44	2	1	3	+4	40
Zack Kassian^{†}	17	1	2	3	−1	31
Marc-Andre Gragnani^{†}	14	1	2	3	−4	6
Mikael Samuelsson^{‡}	6	1	2	3	−1	6
Christopher Tanev	25	0	2	2	+10	2
Mike Duco	6	0	2	2	+1	5
Aaron Volpatti	23	1	0	1	−2	37
Alexander Sulzer^{‡}	12	0	1	1	+6	2
Bill Sweatt	2	0	0	0	0	0
Mark Mancari	6	0	0	0	0	0
Victor Oreskovich	1	0	0	0	0	7
Marco Sturm^{‡}	6	0	0	0	−5	2

Playoffs

Player	GP	G	A	Pts	+/−	PIM
Henrik Sedin	5	2	3	5	0	4
Dan Hamhuis	5	0	3	3	−2	6
Ryan Kesler	5	0	3	3	−1	6
Alexander Edler	5	2	0	2	−2	8
Daniel Sedin	2	0	2	2	0	0
Kevin Bieksa	5	1	0	1	0	6
Jannik Hansen	5	1	0	1	−1	14
Alex Burrows	5	1	0	1	−1	7
Samuel Pahlsson	5	1	0	1	−2	4
Keith Ballard	4	0	1	1	−1	2
Maxim Lapierre	5	0	1	1	0	16
David Booth	5	0	1	1	−1	0
Mason Raymond	5	0	1	1	−3	0
Byron Bitz	1	0	0	0	0	15
Aaron Rome	1	0	0	0	0	0
Andrew Ebbett	1	0	0	0	0	0
Dale Weise	2	0	0	0	0	0
Zack Kassian	4	0	0	0	1	2
Christopher Tanev	5	0	0	0	0	0
Manny Malhotra	5	0	0	0	−2	0
Sami Salo	5	0	0	0	−3	2
Chris Higgins	5	0	0	0	−3	2

=== Goaltenders ===
Note: GP = Games played; GS = Game Starts; TOI = Time on ice (minutes); W = Wins; L = Losses; OT = Overtime losses; GA = Goals against; GAA= Goals against average; SA= Shots against; Sv% = Save percentage; SO= Shutouts

Regular season

Player	GP	GS	TOI	W	L	OT	GA	GAA	SA	Sv%	SO
Roberto Luongo	55	54	3,162	31	14	8	127	2.41	1,577	.919	5
Cory Schneider	33	28	1,832	20	8	1	60	1.96	885	.937	3

Playoffs

Player	GP	Min	W	L	GA	GAA	SA	Sv%	SO
Cory Schneider	3	183	1	2	4	1.31	101	.960	0
Roberto Luongo	2	117	0	2	7	3.59	64	.891	0

^{†}Denotes player spent time with another team before joining Canucks. Stats reflect time with Canucks only.
^{‡}Traded mid-season. Stats reflect time with Canucks only.

Updated after game on April 7, 2012

== Awards and records ==
=== Records ===
Regular season
Player	Record	Awarded
Alain Vigneault	Most franchise victories (coaching) – 247	November 23, 2011
Roberto Luongo	Most franchise victories (goalie) – 212	January 21, 2012
Daniel Sedin	Most franchise overtime goals – 10	January 31, 2012

=== Milestones ===
Regular season
Player	Milestone	Reached
Henrik Sedin	500th consecutive game	October 6, 2011
Dale Weise	1st career goal 1st career point	October 20, 2011
Dale Weise	1st career assist	October 29, 2011
Ryan Kesler	500th career game	November 23, 2011
Daniel Sedin	5th career hat trick	December 6, 2011
Mike Duco	1st career point 1st career assist	January 10, 2012
Alex Burrows	500th career game	February 21, 2012

=== Awards ===
Regular season
Player	Award	Awarded
Cory Schneider	NHL Second Star of the Week	November 28, 2011
Henrik Sedin	NHL Third Star of the Month	January 1, 2012
Cody Hodgson	NHL Rookie of the Month	February 2, 2012

== Draft picks ==
Vancouver's picks at the 2011 NHL Entry Draft in Saint Paul, Minnesota.

Round	#	Player	Position	Nationality	College/Junior/Club team (League)
1	29	Nicklas Jensen	LW	Denmark	Oshawa Generals (OHL)
3	71^{1}	David Honzík	G	Czech Republic	Victoriaville Tigres (QMJHL)
3	90	Alexandre Grenier	RW	Canada	Halifax Mooseheads (QMJHL)
4	101^{1}	Joseph LaBate	C	United States	Academy of Holy Angels (USHS-MN)
4	120	Ludwig Blomstrand	LW	Sweden	Djurgardens IF J20 (J20 SuperElit)
5	150	Frank Corrado	D	Canada	Sudbury Wolves (OHL)
6	180	Pathrik Westerholm	RW	Sweden	Malmo Redhawks (Allsvenskan)
7	210	Henrik Tommernes	D	Sweden	Frolunda HC (Elitserien)

* An additional second-round draft pick was awarded to the Montreal Canadiens as compensation for failing to sign a first-round draft choice. Therefore, all picks after have been moved down by one. The New Jersey Devils forfeit a third-round draft pick, but league protocol retains the draft pick number so that subsequent draft numbers are unaffected.
1. These picks were acquired in a trade with the Minnesota Wild that sent the Canucks 60th overall pick for the 71st and 101st overall picks.

== Transactions ==
=== Trades ===
February 27, 2012	To Vancouver Canucks Andrew Gordon	To Anaheim Ducks Sebastian Erixon
February 27, 2012	To Vancouver Canucks Zack Kassian; Marc-Andre Gragnani	To Buffalo Sabres Cody Hodgson; Alexander Sulzer
February 27, 2012	To Vancouver Canucks Samuel Pahlsson	To Columbus Blue Jackets Taylor Ellington; 4th-round pick in 2012; 4th-round pick in 2012
October 22, 2011	To Vancouver Canucks David Booth; Steven Reinprecht; 3rd-round pick in 2013	To Florida Panthers Marco Sturm; Mikael Samuelsson
July 9, 2011	To Vancouver Canucks Mike Duco	To Florida Panthers Sergei Shirokov
June 28, 2011	To Vancouver Canucks 4th-round pick in 2012	To New York Islanders Christian Ehrhoff (Note: Trade of negotiating rights to.)
June 25, 2011	To Vancouver Canucks 3rd-round pick in 2011; 3rd-round pick in 2011	To Minnesota Wild 2nd-round pick in 2011

=== Players signed ===
Date	Player	Contract terms
September 23, 2011	Frank Corrado	3 years, $1.83 million
September 22, 2011	Nicklas Jensen	3 years, $2.775 million
September 8, 2011	Victor Oreskovich	1 year, $605,000
July 28, 2011	Jannik Hansen	3 years, $4.05 million
July 1, 2011	Nolan Baumgartner	1 year, $525,000
July 1, 2011	Chris Higgins	2 years, $3.8 million
July 1, 2011	Sami Salo	1 year, $2 million
June 29, 2011	Andrew Alberts	2 years, $2.45 million
June 27, 2011	Maxim Lapierre	2 years, $2 million
June 27, 2011	Kevin Bieksa	5 years, $23 million

=== Waivers ===
==== Acquired ====
Date	Player	Former team
October 4, 2011	Dale Weise	New York Rangers

=== Free agents signed ===
Player	Former team	Contract terms
Byron Bitz	Free agent	1 year, $700,000
Alexander Sulzer	Florida Panthers	1 year, $700,000
Matt Climie	San Antonio Rampage (AHL)	1 year, $525,000
Steve Pinizzotto	Hershey Bears (AHL)	1 year, $600,000
Andrew Ebbett	Phoenix Coyotes	1 year, $525,000
Marco Sturm	Washington Capitals	1 year, $2.25 million
Mark Mancari	Buffalo Sabres	1 year, $525,000

=== Free agents lost ===
Player	New team	Contract terms
Lee Sweatt	Ottawa Senators	2 years, $1.3 million
Jeff Tambellini	ZSC Lions (NLA)	3 years
Guillaume Desbiens	Calgary Flames	1 year, $525,000
Rick Rypien	Winnipeg Jets	1 year, $700,000
Tanner Glass	Winnipeg Jets	1 year, $750,000
Alex Bolduc	Phoenix Coyotes	1 year, $575,000
Raffi Torres	Phoenix Coyotes	2 years, $3.5 million
Sergei Shirokov	CSKA Moscow	3 years

== Farm teams ==
- The Chicago Wolves are the new Canucks' American Hockey League affiliate beginning in the 2011–12 season.
- The Kalamazoo Wings are the new Canucks' ECHL affiliate beginning in the 2011–12 season.

== See also ==
- 2011–12 NHL season
