= 2011–12 Calgary Flames season =

NHL team season

2011–12 Calgary Flames
- Division: 2nd Northwest
- Conference: 9th Western
- 2011–12 record: 37–29–16
- Home record: 23–12–6
- Road record: 14–17–10
- Goals for: 202
- Goals against: 226

Team information
- General manager: Jay Feaster
- Coach: Brent Sutter
- Captain: Jarome Iginla
- Alternate captains: Jay Bouwmeester; Mark Giordano
- Arena: Scotiabank Saddledome
- Average attendance: 19,289 (100%)

Team leaders
- Goals: Jarome Iginla (32)
- Assists: Olli Jokinen (38)
- Points: Jarome Iginla (67)
- Penalty minutes: Tim Jackman (94)
- Plus/minus: Alex Tanguay (+7)
- Wins: Miikka Kiprusoff (35)
- Goals against average: Miikka Kiprusoff (2.35)

The 2011–12 Calgary Flames season was the 32nd season in Calgary and 40th for the Flames franchise in the National Hockey League (NHL). The Flames finished with a 37–29–16 record, finishing second in the Northwest Division and ninth in the Western Conference. The team failed to qualify for the 2012 Stanley Cup playoffs, the third consecutive year the team did not make the postseason.

Three players reach major individual milestones during the season: Olli Jokinen appeared in his 1,000th game, goaltender Miikka Kiprusoff won his 300th game and captain Jarome Iginla became the 42nd player in NHL history to score 500 goals. Iginla was also named the Flames' lone representative at the 59th National Hockey League All-Star Game.

Questions surrounded the future direction of the organization at seasons' end, as head coach Brent Sutter's three-year contract was set to expire after three non-playoff seasons and as with previous seasons, Iginla's future with the organization was again questioned, particularly given his contract had one year remaining after the 2011–12 season.

== Off-season ==
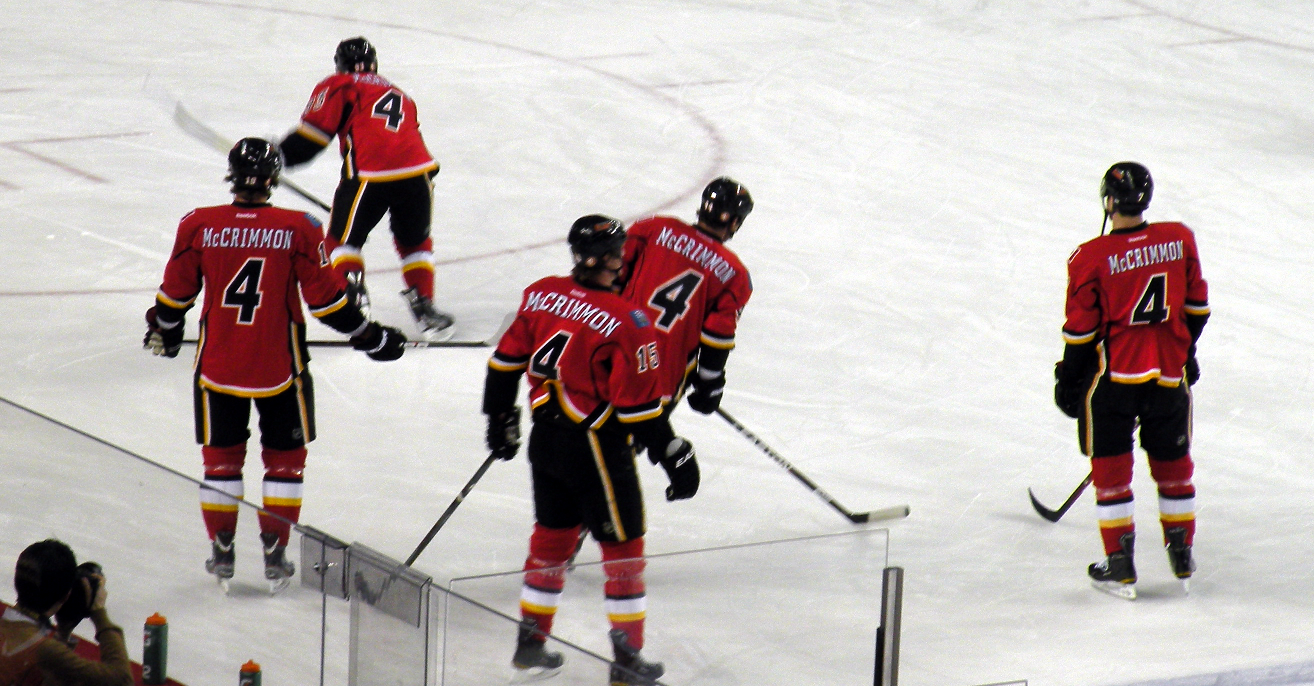
The Flames wear special uniforms honouring Brad McCrimmon, a former player and coach in Calgary who died in the 2011 Lokomotiv Yaroslavl plane crash.

The Flames began their off-season by solidifying their management and coaching staff. Jay Feaster, who had served as interim general manager following the departure of Darryl Sutter in December 2010, was named to the position on a permanent basis on May 16, 2011, and Special Assistant Craig Conroy accepted a four-year contract extension. Feaster's first decision as general manager was to trade 2008 first round draft pick Tim Erixon to the New York Rangers in exchange for prospect Roman Horak and two-second-round picks. The deal was made hours before the Flames would have lost the rights to Erixon, as he refused to sign with Calgary despite being offered the maximum salary and bonuses available under the Collective Bargaining Agreement.

Head coach Brent Sutter augmented his staff by adding two veteran coaches. Craig Hartsburg, who had 14-years experience in the NHL, was hired as an associate coach. Clint Malarchuk, a ten-year veteran as a player, was brought in to serve as the team's goaltending coach.

Following two seasons where the Flames missed the playoffs, the team made a significant change to their team over the summer. Robyn Regehr, alternate captain and long-time leader of the team's defence, was dealt to the Buffalo Sabres. The move was made in part to free up salary cap room to re-sign forward Alex Tanguay to a long-term contract. Veteran centre Daymond Langkow, who missed all but four games in 2010–11 due to injury, was also dealt.

== Regular season ==
=== October – December ===
Calgary entered the 2011–12 season with mixed expectations. In its annual preview, The Hockey News predicted the Flames would again miss the playoffs, anticipating that the team will finish 10th in the Western Conference. The magazine argued that the team had too many players who under-performed in all aspects of the game the previous season and that they could not afford similar performances and still hope to qualify. However, the National Hockey League's writers predicted the Flames would qualify for the playoffs with a sixth-place finish in the conference. They argued that the team's top-end talent, including Jarome Iginla, Miikka Kiprusoff and Alex Tanguay, were capable of bringing the team into playoff contention. They also predicted that if the team should fail to live up to this expectation, the franchise could find itself on the verge of a complete rebuild.

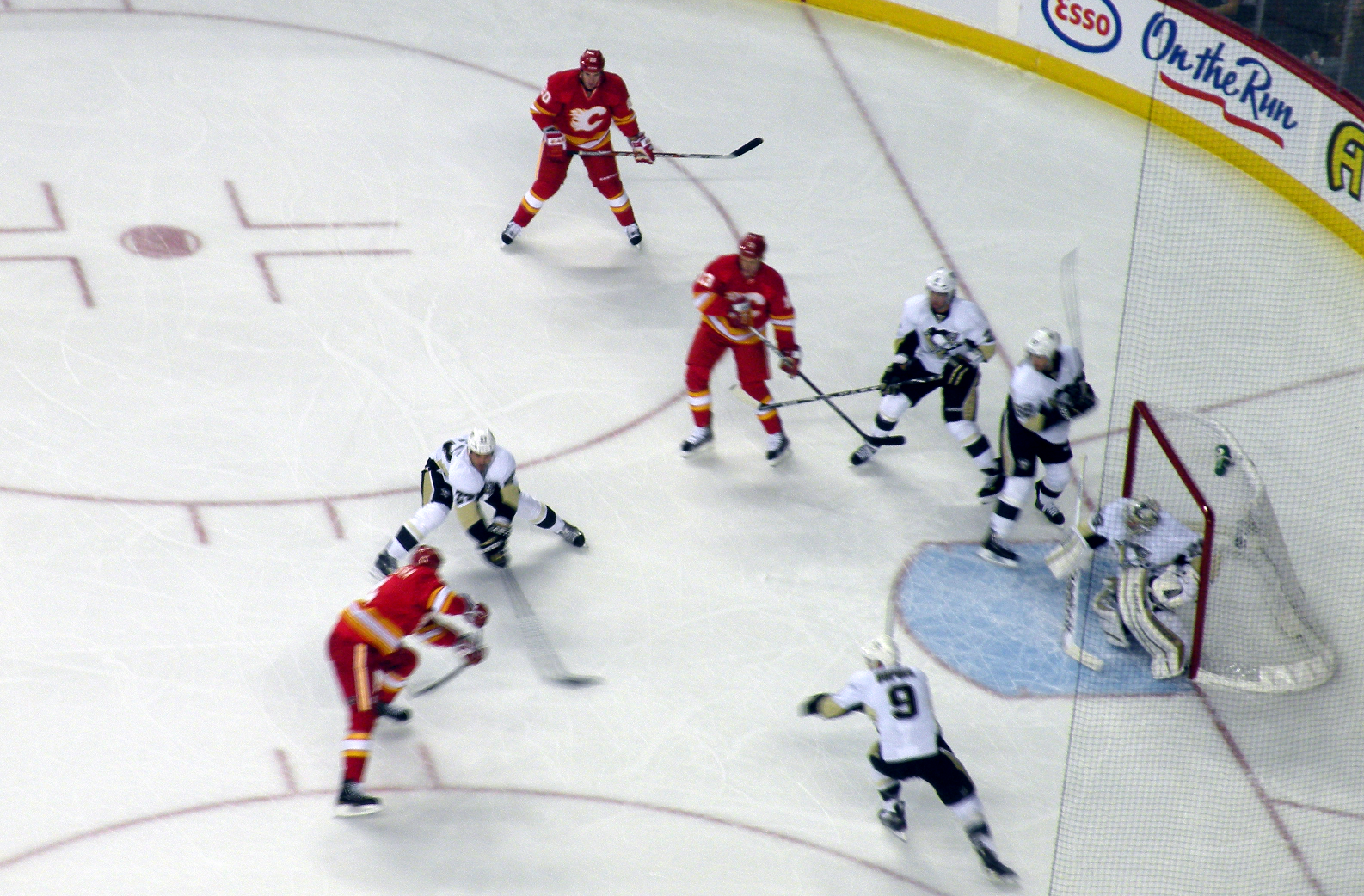
The Flames press the Pittsburgh Penguins during the season opener.

The Flames were expected to open the season in Helsinki as part of the NHL's annual European premiere series. However, given organizational changes following the departure of Darryl Sutter, the team opted against the trip, preferring to avoid the distractions of traveling to Finland to open the season.

Calgary dropped their first two decisions of the season before earning their first win in a record-setting game for goaltender Miikka Kiprusoff. The 4–1 victory over the Montreal Canadiens on October 13 was Kiprusoff's 263rd as a Calgary Flame, moving him past Mike Vernon to become the franchise's all-time leader in wins. The team struggled to score early in the season, finding itself 28th out of 30 teams in NHL scoring 14 games into the season, leaving the team in 13th place in the conference. Feaster expressed frustration with the results, stating that the organization would not show a great deal of patience if the team did not improve.

Continued struggles in November gave rise to speculation that the Flames might trade captain Jarome Iginla, who himself had failed to meet expectations during the first part of the season. Feaster finally put an end to the speculation in early December, clearly stating that the team was not looking to move the franchise's all-time leading scorer. The team failed to move in the standings in November, remaining in 13th place at the end of the month. However, the Flames showed improved play toward the end of the month which continued into early December. A 5–1–1 stretch to December 8 allowed the Flames to move ahead of the Colorado Avalanche and out of last place in the Northwest Division.

After briefly moving above .500, a mid-December road trip in which the Flames failed to earn a win in four games again left them with more losses than victories. However, Calgary entered the Christmas break with three consecutive wins, each over a top team in the Western Conference: 2–1 over the Northwest Division leading Minnesota Wild, 3–2 over the Detroit Red Wings and 3–1 over the Vancouver Canucks. The first two victories came while Rene Bourque was absent from the lineup to serve a two-game suspension for a checking from behind infraction against the Chicago Blackhawks. The victory over the Canucks was the first of Leland Irving's NHL career. The rookie goaltender was recalled from the Abbotsford Heat early in December after Calgary's usual backup, Henrik Karlsson was injured. Irving was the American Hockey League (AHL) leader in wins, shutouts and games played at the time of his recall. The game against Vancouver was also the first of a season-long, seven-game road trip, during which the Flames' home arena played host to the 2012 World Junior Ice Hockey Championships.

In addition to Irving, several other players reached personal milestones around the midpoint of the season. Brendan Morrison scored his 400th assist on December 22 against the Detroit Red Wings and his 600th point on December 29 against the New York Islanders. Olli Jokinen appeared in his 1,000th NHL game on January 1 against the Nashville Predators.

=== January – April ===
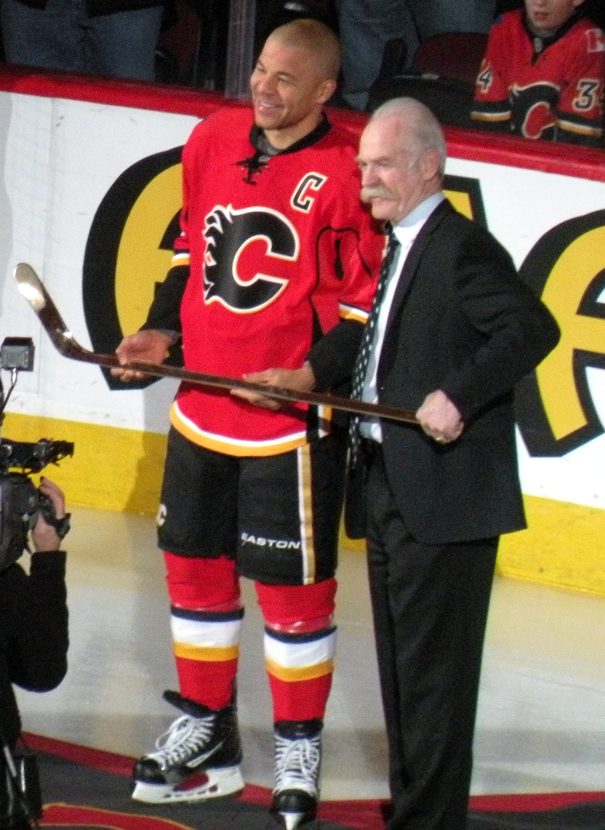
Lanny McDonald presents Iginla with a gold stick in recognition of his 500th NHL goal

A shootout win over the Columbus Blue Jackets in the first game after the Christmas break gave way to five consecutive losses on the road as the Flames finished their road trip at 2–4–1. The trip ended with a 9–0 defeat to the Boston Bruins that Iginla described as "embarrassing" and "one of the worst games in memory". Of note, defenceman Chris Butler had a plus/minus rating of −7 in the game, the worst the NHL has seen since Doug Wilson was also −7 on February 19, 1993, in a game against Calgary. Adding to the Flames woes, seven regulars ended the trip out of the lineup due to injury, including three defencemen and first-line winger Alex Tanguay. Also missing was second-line forward Rene Bourque, who was serving a five-game suspension for elbowing Washington's Nicklas Backstrom.

Iginla reached a major NHL milestone in the Flames' first game back in Calgary, scoring his 500th career goal in the third period of a 3–1 victory over the Minnesota Wild on January 7, 2012. He became the 42nd player in NHL history to accomplish the feat, and only the 15th to score his first 500 goals with one franchise. He was subsequently named the Flames' only representative at the 59th National Hockey League All-Star Game in Ottawa. It was Iginla's sixth all-star appearance, and he scored one goal and two assists in the contest.

A Flames victory over the New Jersey Devils on January 10, 6–3 despite being outshot 38–14, was Calgary's seventh consecutive win on home ice and moved them back above .500. The Flames' home winning streak was ended at eight following a loss to the Los Angeles Kings on January 14, the first time the Kings won in Calgary in regulation time in seven years. Struggling on offence throughout the month, the team ended January with a record of 5–6–1 and remained outside of a playoff position.

Injuries continued to impact the lineup. Tanguay returned to action in late January, but Curtis Glencross and Lee Stempniak were sidelined with a knee injury and high ankle sprain, respectively. Stempniak's injury led the Flames to sign forward Krys Kolanos to a contract at the start of February. He had been playing for their American Hockey League (AHL) affiliate on a professional tryout deal after missing 22 months following hip surgery. Kolanos had been leading the Abbotsford Heat in scoring at the time of his recall.

The team had already lost 238-man-games to injury by the time they faced the Vancouver Canucks in a February 11 game and suffered further losses when Blair Jones suffered a broken ankle against the Phoenix Coyotes before Mikael Backlund suffered a shoulder injury in the game against Vancouver. Both players were expected to miss up to six weeks. The loss of both players forced the Flames to move Michael Cammalleri back to centre, a position he hadn't played since 2005. Despite the losses, the Flames continued winning, posting a 3–2 shootout victory over the Canucks followed by a 5–1 defeat of the Toronto Maple Leafs. Following an overtime loss to the Dallas Stars the Flames defeated the Los Angeles Kings 1–0, in Los Angeles, on February 18 to move their record to 10–3–4 since the 9–0 defeat to Boston. The team moved into eighth place in the West, the first time all season Calgary occupied a playoff spot.

The team did not remain in a playoff position for long, as the Flames returned to the Saddledome and lost all four games of a homestand in the lead up to the February 27 trading deadline. A frustrated Jay Feaster criticized his team's veterans in an interview during a shootout loss to the Coyotes and threatened changes, only to backtrack a day later. Feaster ultimately chose to make no trades at the deadline, hoping that the return of Glencross, Moss and Smith from the injured list would be enough for the team to qualify for the post-season. A 4–2 victory in Phoenix on March 1 broke the team's losing streak, but the Flames lost a critical game the following night in Anaheim. Ryan Getzlaf scored the deciding goal for the Ducks in the final minute of a 3–2 victory that extended Calgary's regular-season losing streak in Anaheim to 15 games.

Injuries continued to be a dominant theme for the Flames, as Cammalleri, Blake Comeau and Lance Bouma all went down in games against Anaheim and Dallas, forcing the team to recall Abbotsford's entire top line of Greg Nemisz, Guillaume Desbiens and Krys Kolanos on an emergency basis for their March 6 game against the Montreal Canadiens. The Flames lost another forward against Montreal – a 5–4 victory that ended a five-game home losing streak – as Tim Jackman became the seventh regular forward knocked out of the lineup. He played only one shift in the game before suffering an "upper-body injury" for the Flames, who had already lost over 300-man-games to injury at that point. The Flames added top prospect Sven Baertschi from the Western Hockey League's Portland Winterhawks due to a provision that gave teams the option to recall junior players under contract as their third or later emergency recall. Baertschi made his NHL debut against the Winnipeg Jets then scored his first goal in the following game, against the Minnesota Wild. Jarome Iginla scored his 30th goal of the season on March 13 against the San Jose Sharks to become the seventh player to reach that total for 11 consecutive seasons. These games were part of a four-game winning streak that brought the Flames into a four team tie for eighth place with 78 points, one back of Phoenix in seventh.

The winning streak reached five games, before losses to non-contenting teams in the Oilers, Blue Jackets, Wild – the latter two in a shootout – and to the Avalanche, whom the Flames were battling for a playoff spot, left the players disappointed in their performance. Speaking about the team's chances of making the post-season with just over two weeks remaining in the regular season, Alex Tanguay stated that "we're just giving it away." An overtime loss to the Canucks officially eliminated the Flames from playoff contention with two games left in the season. The team won the final two games, 3–2 over Vancouver and 5–2 over Anaheim. Both victories were sparked by Akim Aliu, a rookie forward recalled from Abbotsford to evaluate his play at the NHL level. He served as an agitator, scored two goals and added an assist. The final game also marked the 350th consecutive sell-out for the Flames at the Saddledome.

== Post-season ==
After missing the playoffs for the third consecutive season, all aspects of the Flames organization were questioned by the fans and media. Head coach Brent Sutter's three-year contract expires on June 30, 2012, and while he expressed a desire to return for the 2012–13 season, it was unknown if the team would sign him to a new deal. In a late-season interview with Fan 960 radio, former Flames coach Mike Keenan argued that his dismissal in 2009 was forced by team President Ken King and the lead owner Murray Edwards, prompting arguments that general manager Jay Feaster's job was also being interfered with by King and Edwards. Feaster denied the allegation, stating that he had "full and complete responsibility for the hockey operations of the club including personnel" and added that his reporting relationship in Calgary was no different from when he was the general manager of the Tampa Bay Lightning in the early 2000s.

The future of captain Jarome Iginla was also questioned. He has one season remaining on his contract with the team, and with the future direction of the team in doubt, even he questioned whether he would be with the team in 2012–13: "I really don't know what next year holds. I don't know the direction (of the team). Do I wanna rebuild? Do I wanna be on a team if we fully rebuild? I don't know that I do." Calgary Sun columnist Eric Francis argued that the team's ownership, who despite viewing Iginla as an iconic figure for the team and the face of the organization for over a decade, were willing to seriously entertain options that involved trading him for the first time.

== Standings ==
Northwest Division
Pos	Team	GP	W	L	OTL	ROW	GF	GA	GD	Pts
1	p – Vancouver Canucks	82	51	22	9	43	249	198	+51	111
2	Calgary Flames	82	37	29	16	34	202	226	−24	90
3	Colorado Avalanche	82	41	35	6	32	208	220	−12	88
4	Minnesota Wild	82	35	36	11	24	177	226	−49	81
5	Edmonton Oilers	82	32	40	10	27	212	239	−27	74

Source: National Hockey League
p – Clinched Presidents' Trophy

Western Conference
Pos	Div	Team	GP	W	L	OTL	ROW	GF	GA	GD	Pts
1	NW	p – Vancouver Canucks	82	51	22	9	43	249	198	+51	111
2	CE	y – St. Louis Blues	82	49	22	11	45	210	165	+45	109
3	PA	y – Phoenix Coyotes	82	42	27	13	36	216	204	+12	97
4	CE	x – Nashville Predators	82	48	26	8	43	237	210	+27	104
5	CE	x – Detroit Red Wings	82	48	28	6	39	248	203	+45	102
6	CE	x – Chicago Blackhawks	82	45	26	11	38	248	238	+10	101
7	PA	x – San Jose Sharks	82	43	29	10	34	228	210	+18	96
8	PA	x – Los Angeles Kings	82	40	27	15	34	194	179	+15	95
9	NW	Calgary Flames	82	37	29	16	34	202	226	−24	90
10	PA	Dallas Stars	82	42	35	5	35	211	222	−11	89
11	NW	Colorado Avalanche	82	41	35	6	32	208	220	−12	88
12	NW	Minnesota Wild	82	35	36	11	24	177	226	−49	81
13	PA	Anaheim Ducks	82	34	36	12	31	204	231	−27	80
14	NW	Edmonton Oilers	82	32	40	10	27	212	239	−27	74
15	CE	Columbus Blue Jackets	82	29	46	7	25	202	262	−60	65

Source: National Hockey League
p – Clinched Presidents' Trophy; x – Clinched playoff spot; y – Clinched division

== Schedule and results ==
=== Pre-season ===
2011 Pre-season Game Log: 3–3–0 (Home: 3–1–0; Road: 0–2–0)
#	Date	Visitor	Score	Home	OT	Decision	Attendance	Record
1	September 20	Vancouver	1–5	Calgary		Kiprusoff	19,289	1–0–0
2	September 20	Calgary	3–4	Vancouver		Irving	18,860	1–1–0
3	September 24	Calgary	1–2	Edmonton		Irving	16,839	1–2–0
4	September 25	Edmonton	3–0	Calgary		Karlsson	19,289	1–3–0
5	September 27	NY Islanders	0–2	Calgary		Karlsson	19,289	2–3–0
6	September 29	Phoenix	2–4	Calgary		Kiprusoff	19,289	3–3–0
Legend: Win Loss Overtime/shootout loss

=== Regular season ===
2011–12 Game log

October: 4–4–1 (Home: 3–2–1; Road: 1–2–0)
#	Date	Visitor	Score	Home	OT	Decision	Attendance	Record	Pts
1	October 8	Pittsburgh	5–3	Calgary		Kiprusoff	19,289	0–1–0	0
2	October 10	Calgary	2–5	St. Louis		Karlsson	19,150	0–2–0	0
3	October 13	Calgary	4–1	Montreal		Kiprusoff	21,273	1–2–0	2
4	October 15	Calgary	2–3	Toronto		Kiprusoff	19,410	1–3–0	2
5	October 18	Edmonton	1–2	Calgary		Kiprusoff	19,289	2–3–0	4
6	October 20	NY Rangers	3–2	Calgary	OT	Karlsson	19,289	2–3–1	5
7	October 22	Nashville	2–0	Calgary		Kiprusoff	19,289	2–4–1	5
8	October 26	Colorado	2–4	Calgary		Kiprusoff	19,289	3–4–1	7
9	October 28	St. Louis	1–3	Calgary		Kiprusoff	19,289	4–4–1	9

November: 6–8–0 (Home: 2–3–0; Road: 4–5–0)
#	Date	Visitor	Score	Home	OT	Decision	Attendance	Record	Pts
10	November 1	Vancouver	5–1	Calgary		Kiprusoff	19,289	4–5–1	9
11	November 3	Calgary	4–1	Detroit		Kiprusoff	20,066	5–5–1	11
12	November 4	Calgary	1–2	Buffalo		Karlsson	18,690	5–6–1	11
13	November 6	Calgary	2–1	Colorado		Kiprusoff	15,356	6–6–1	13
14	November 8	Minnesota	3–0	Calgary		Kiprusoff	19,289	6–7–1	13
15	November 11	Calgary	1–4	Chicago		Kiprusoff	21,720	6–8–1	13
16	November 12	Calgary	4–3	Colorado		Kiprusoff	14,919	7–8–1	15
17	November 15	Ottawa	3–1	Calgary		Kiprusoff	19,289	7–9–1	15
18	November 18	Chicago	2–5	Calgary		Kiprusoff	19,289	8–9–1	17
19	November 21	Calgary	1–4	Columbus		Karlsson	11,629	8–10–1	17
20	November 23	Calgary	3–5	Detroit		Kiprusoff	20,066	8–11–1	17
21	November 25	Calgary	0–2	St. Louis		Kiprusoff	19,150	8–12–1	17
22	November 27	Calgary	5–2	Minnesota		Kiprusoff	16,864	9–12–1	19
23	November 29	Nashville	0–1	Calgary		Kiprusoff	19,289	10–12–1	21

December: 8–4–4 (Home: 5–0–1; Road: 3–4–3)
#	Date	Visitor	Score	Home	OT	Decision	Attendance	Record	Pts
24	December 1	Columbus	4–3	Calgary	SO	Kiprusoff	19,289	10–12–2	22
25	December 3	Calgary	5–3	Edmonton		Kiprusoff	16,839	11–12–2	24
26	December 4	Calgary	1–5	Vancouver		Karlsson	18,890	11–13–2	24
27	December 6	Carolina	6–7	Calgary		Kiprusoff	19,289	12–13–2	26
28	December 8	Colorado	2–3	Calgary		Kiprusoff	19,289	13–13–2	28
29	December 10	Edmonton	0–3	Calgary		Kiprusoff	19,289	14–13–2	30
30	December 13	Calgary	1–2	Nashville		Kiprusoff	14,813	14–14–2	30
31	December 15	Calgary	4–5	Tampa Bay	OT	Kiprusoff	17,241	14–14–3	31
32	December 16	Calgary	2–3	Florida	SO	Irving	15,575	14–14–4	32
33	December 18	Calgary	2–4	Chicago		Kiprusoff	21,192	14–15–4	32
34	December 20	Minnesota	1–2	Calgary		Kiprusoff	19,289	15–15–4	34
35	December 22	Detroit	2–3	Calgary		Kiprusoff	19,289	16–15–4	36
36	December 23	Calgary	3–1	Vancouver		Irving	18,890	17–15–4	38
37	December 27	Calgary	2–1	Columbus	SO	Kiprusoff	16,985	18–15–4	40
38	December 29	Calgary	1–3	NY Islanders		Kiprusoff	14,819	18–16–4	40
39	December 30	Calgary	3–4	Ottawa	OT	Irving	20,500	18–16–5	41

January: 5–6–1 (Home: 3–3–0; Road: 2–3–1)
#	Date	Visitor	Score	Home	OT	Decision	Attendance	Record	Pts
40	January 1	Calgary	3–5	Nashville		Kiprusoff	17,113	18–17–5	41
41	January 3	Calgary	1–3	Washington		Kiprusoff	18,506	18–18–5	41
42	January 5	Calgary	0–9	Boston		Irving	17,565	18–19–5	41
43	January 7	Minnesota	1–3	Calgary		Kiprusoff	19,289	19–19–5	43
44	January 10	New Jersey	3–6	Calgary		Kiprusoff	19,289	20–19–5	45
45	January 12	Anaheim	0–1	Calgary	OT	Kiprusoff	19,289	21–19–5	47
46	January 14	Los Angeles	4–1	Calgary		Kiprusoff	19,289	21–20–5	47
47	January 17	Calgary	1–2	San Jose	SO	Kiprusoff	17,562	21–20–6	48
48	January 19	Calgary	2–1	Los Angeles	SO	Kiprusoff	18,118	22–20–6	50
49	January 21	Calgary	6–2	Edmonton		Kiprusoff	16,839	23–20–6	52
50	January 24	San Jose	1–0	Calgary		Kiprusoff	19,289	23–21–6	52
51	January 31	Detroit	3–1	Calgary		Kiprusoff	19,289	23–22–6	52

February: 5–2–5 (Home: 3–2–2; Road: 2–0–3)
#	Date	Visitor	Score	Home	OT	Decision	Attendance	Record	Pts
52	February 3	Chicago	1–3	Calgary		Kiprusoff	19,289	24–22–6	54
53	February 6	Calgary	2–3	Anaheim	SO	Kiprusoff	12,096	24–22–7	55
54	February 8	Calgary	4–3	San Jose		Kiprusoff	17,562	25–22–7	57
55	February 9	Calgary	1–2	Phoenix	OT	Irving	10,048	25–22–8	58
56	February 11	Vancouver	2–3	Calgary	SO	Kiprusoff	19,289	26–22–8	60
57	February 14	Toronto	1–5	Calgary		Kiprusoff	19,289	27–22–8	62
58	February 16	Calgary	2–3	Dallas	OT	Kiprusoff	11,839	27–22–9	63
59	February 18	Calgary	1–0	Los Angeles		Kiprusoff	18,118	28–22–9	65
60	February 21	Edmonton	6–1	Calgary		Kiprusoff	19,289	28–23–9	65
61	February 23	Phoenix	4–3	Calgary	SO	Kiprusoff	19,289	28–23–10	66
62	February 25	Philadelphia	5–4	Calgary	SO	Kiprusoff	19,289	28–23–11	67
63	February 27	St. Louis	3–1	Calgary		Kiprusoff	19,289	28–24–11	67

March: 7–5–5 (Home: 5–2–2; Road: 2–3–3)
#	Date	Visitor	Score	Home	OT	Decision	Attendance	Record	Pts
64	March 1	Calgary	4–2	Phoenix		Kiprusoff	10,989	29–24–11	69
65	March 2	Calgary	2–3	Anaheim		Irving	16,431	29–25–11	69
66	March 4	Dallas	3–2	Calgary	SO	Kiprusoff	19,289	29–25–12	70
67	March 6	Montreal	4–5	Calgary		Kiprusoff	19,289	30–25–12	72
68	March 9	Winnipeg	3–5	Calgary		Kiprusoff	19,289	31–25–12	74
69	March 11	Calgary	4–3	Minnesota		Kiprusoff	17,119	32–25–12	76
70	March 13	San Jose	2–3	Calgary	OT	Kiprusoff	19,289	33–25–12	78
71	March 15	Phoenix	1–4	Calgary		Kiprusoff	19,289	34–25–12	80
72	March 16	Calgary	1–3	Edmonton		Irving	16,839	34–26–12	80
73	March 18	Columbus	2–1	Calgary	SO	Kiprusoff	19,289	34–26–13	81
74	March 20	Calgary	1–2	Colorado	OT	Kiprusoff	14,223	34–26–14	82
75	March 22	Calgary	2–3	Minnesota	SO	Kiprusoff	17,002	34–26–15	83
76	March 24	Calgary	1–4	Dallas		Kiprusoff	17,238	34–27–15	83
77	March 26	Dallas	4–5	Calgary		Kiprusoff	19,289	35–27–15	85
78	March 28	Los Angeles	3–0	Calgary		Kiprusoff	19,289	35–28–15	85
79	March 30	Colorado	4–1	Calgary		Kiprusoff	19,289	35–29–15	85
80	March 31	Calgary	2–3	Vancouver	OT	Karlsson	18,890	35–29–16	86

April: 2–0–0 (Home: 2–0–0; Road: 0–0–0)
#	Date	Visitor	Score	Home	OT	Decision	Attendance	Record	Pts
81	April 5	Vancouver	2–3	Calgary		Kiprusoff	19,289	36–29–16	88
82	April 7	Anaheim	2–5	Calgary		Karlsson	19,289	37–29–16	90

Legend: Win (2 points) Loss (0 points) Overtime/shootout loss (1 point)

== Player statistics ==
=== Skaters ===
Note: GP = Games played; G = Goals; A = Assists; Pts = Points; +/− = Plus/minus; PIM = Penalty minutes

Regular season

Player	GP	G	A	Pts	+/−	PIM
Jarome Iginla	82	32	35	67	−10	43
Olli Jokinen	82	23	38	61	-12	54
Alex Tanguay	64	13	36	49	7	28
Curtis Glencross	67	26	22	48	−13	62
Jay Bouwmeester	82	5	24	29	−21	26
Lee Stempniak	61	14	14	28	−2	16
Mark Giordano	61	9	18	27	0	75
Michael Cammalleri^{†}	28	11	8	19	−4	16
Matt Stajan	61	8	10	18	−3	29
Rene Bourque^{‡}	38	13	3	16	−3	41
Blake Comeau^{†}	58	5	10	15	0	24
Chris Butler	68	2	13	15	−9	34
T. J. Brodie	54	2	12	14	3	14
Scott Hannan	78	2	10	12	−10	38
Tom Kostopoulos	81	4	8	12	−15	57
Brendan Morrison^{‡}	28	4	7	11	−1	6
Mikael Backlund	41	4	7	11	−13	16
Anton Babchuk	32	2	8	10	2	6
Roman Horak	61	3	8	11	3	14
Derek Smith	47	2	9	11	−1	12
David Moss	32	2	7	9	-3	12
Cory Sarich	62	1	6	7	1	66
Tim Jackman	75	1	6	7	−21	94
Paul Byron	22	3	2	5	3	2
Niklas Hagman^{‡}	8	1	3	4	3	2
Blair Jones^{†}	21	1	3	4	2	8
Sven Baertschi	5	3	0	3	2	4
Akim Aliu	2	2	1	3	3	12
Lance Bouma	27	1	2	3	−5	11
Krys Kolanos	13	0	1	1	-1	2
Raitis Ivanans	1	0	0	0	−1	0
Brett Carson	2	0	0	0	−2	0
Pierre-Luc Letourneau-Leblond	3	0	0	0	1	10
Clay Wilson	2	0	0	0	0	2
Joe Piskula	5	0	0	0	−5	2
Greg Nemisz	9	0	0	0	1	0
Guillaume Desbiens	10	0	0	0	−1	25

=== Goaltenders ===
Note: GP = Games played; TOI = Time on ice (minutes); W = Wins; L = Losses; OT = Overtime losses; GA = Goals against; GAA= Goals against average; SA= Shots against; SV= Saves; Sv% = Save percentage; SO= Shutouts

Regular season

Player	GP	TOI	W	L	OT	GA	GAA	SA	Sv%	SO	G	A	PIM
Miikka Kiprusoff	70	4128	35	22	11	162	2.35	2040	.921	4	0	0	0
Henrik Karlsson	9	454	1	4	1	24	3.17	239	.900	0	0	0	0
Leland Irving	7	394	1	3	3	21	3.20	239	.912	0	0	0	0

^{†}Denotes player spent time with another organization before joining Flames. Stats reflect time with the Flames only.
^{‡}Traded mid-season

== Awards and honours ==
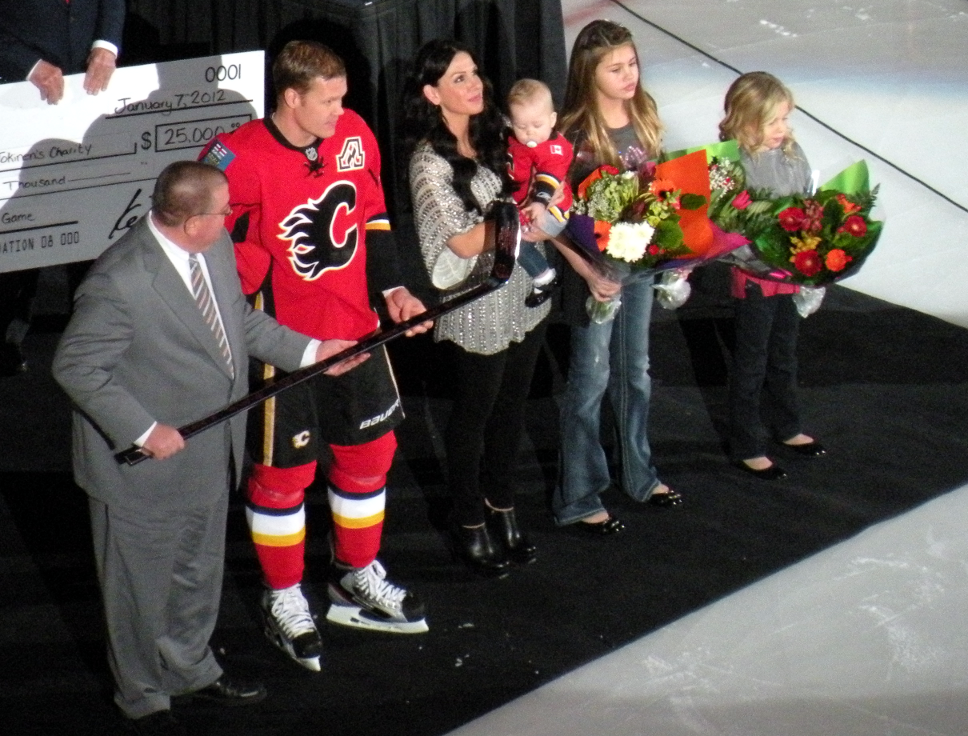
Olli Jokinen is presented with a silver stick in recognition of playing his 1,000th NHL game

Two members of the Flames' 1989 Stanley Cup championship team were announced as members of the Hockey Hall of Fame's 2011 class. Joe Nieuwendyk was a Flames draft pick in 1985 and won the Calder Memorial Trophy in 1988 as the league's rookie of the year. He remained with the Flames until a 1995 trade sent him to the Dallas Stars. He finished his career with 564 goals, 1,126 points and two additional Stanley Cup titles, with the Stars and New Jersey Devils. Doug Gilmour came to Calgary in 1988 as part of a trade with the St. Louis Blues and played parts of five seasons in Calgary until he was sent to the Toronto Maple Leafs in 1992. He finished his career with 450 goals and 1,414 points.

The team announced the introduction of the "Forever a Flame" program during the season. Former players honoured under the program will have a banner raised to the Saddledome rafters though their number will not be formally retired. The first honouree was Al MacInnis, whose number 2 was raised in a ceremony on February 27. MacInnis was an eight-time all-star with the Flames and was named the Conn Smythe Trophy winner as most valuable player of the playoffs with the 1989 Stanley Cup championship team.

=== Awards ===
Player	Award
League awards
Jarome Iginla	First Star of the Week (December 5–11)
Team awards
Curtis Glencross	Ralph T. Scurfield Humanitarian Award
Mark Giordano	J. R. "Bud" McCaig Award

=== Milestones ===
Player	Milestone	Reached
Roman Horak	1st NHL game 1st NHL point (assist)	October 8, 2011
Miikka Kiprusoff	263rd win as a Flame (Franchise record)	October 13, 2011
Roman Horak	1st NHL goal	October 26, 2011
T. J. Brodie	1st NHL point (assist)	November 18, 2011
Alex Tanguay	700th NHL point	November 21, 2011
T. J. Brodie	1st NHL goal	November 27, 2011
Derek Smith	1st NHL goal	November 29, 2011
Leland Irving	1st NHL game	December 16, 2011
Brendan Morrison	400th NHL assist	December 22, 2011
Leland Irving	1st NHL win	December 23, 2011
Brendan Morrison	600th NHL point	December 29, 2011
Olli Jokinen	1,000th NHL game	January 1, 2012
Brendan Morrison	200th NHL goal	January 1, 2012
Lance Bouma	1st NHL goal	January 7, 2012
Jarome Iginla	500th NHL goal	January 7, 2012
Lee Stempniak	500th NHL game	January 10, 2012
Miikka Kiprusoff	527th game as a Flame (Franchise record – goaltender)	February 3, 2012
Miikka Kiprusoff	300th NHL win	February 8, 2012
Tom Kostopoulos	600th NHL game	March 6, 2012
Matt Stajan	100th NHL goal	March 9, 2012
Sven Baertschi	1st NHL game	March 9, 2012
Sven Baertschi	1st NHL goal	March 11, 2012
Matt Stajan	600th NHL game	March 18, 2012
Akim Aliu	1st NHL game 1st NHL point (assist)	April 5, 2012
Akim Aliu	1st NHL goal	April 7, 2012

== Transactions ==
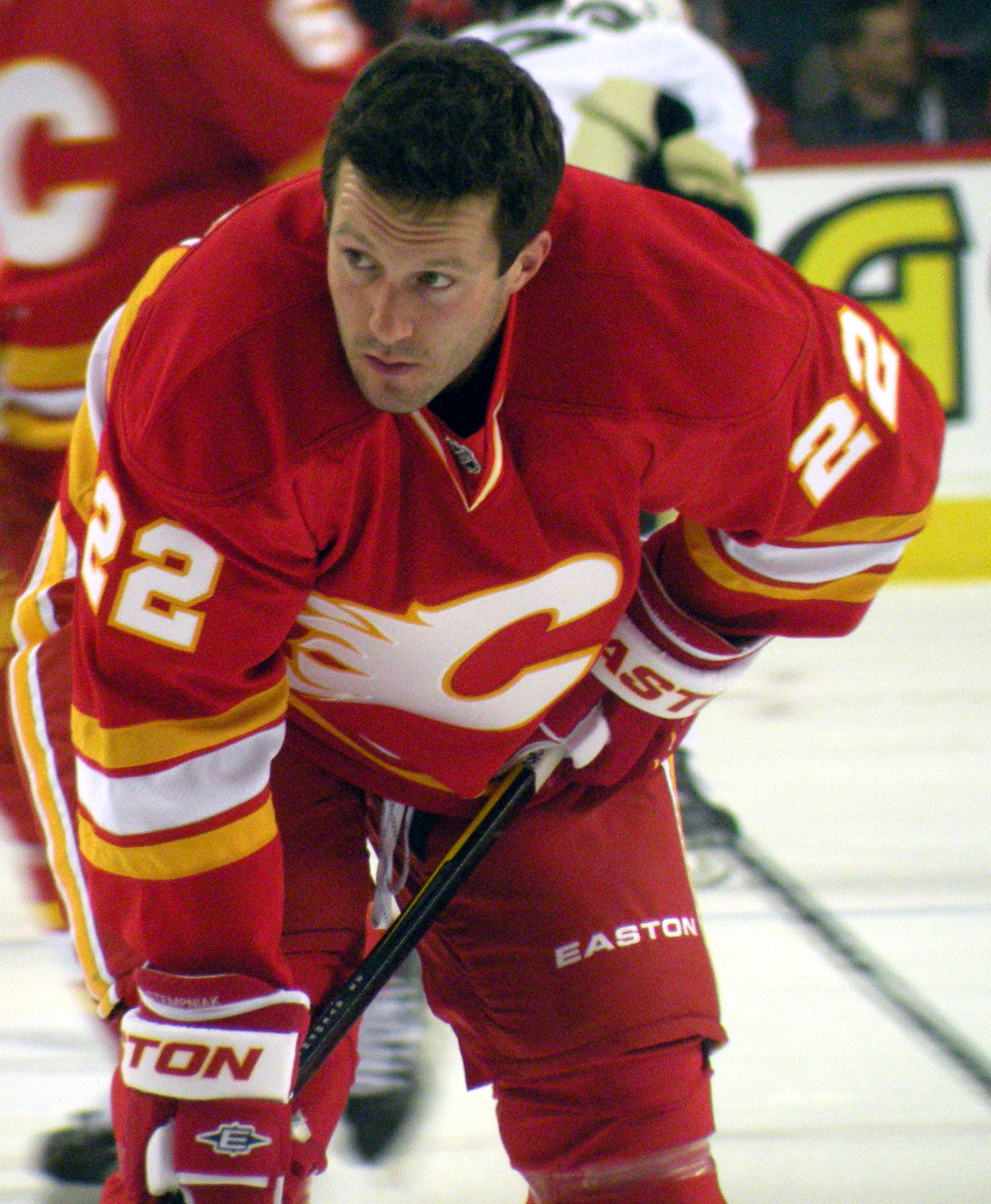
Lee Stempniak was acquired in an off-season trade with Phoenix.

The Flames parted with two veteran leaders over the summer, first shipping alternate captain Robyn Regehr to the Buffalo Sabres along with Ales Kotalik for two young players, Chris Butler and Paul Byron, at the end of June. Two months later, Daymond Langkow, who had missed all but four games the previous season due to a neck injury, was traded to the Phoenix Coyotes in exchange for Lee Stempniak. Both deals had salary cap implications for the Flames, allowing them greater room to maneuver financially, while the Langkow deal was made with an eye towards getting younger, as the former Flame was 35 years old at the time of the deal, seven years older than Stempniak.

Calgary was involved in a six-player trade in early January that was achieved through somewhat bizarre circumstances. general manager Jay Feaster had been working with his Montreal Canadiens counterpart Pierre Gauthier on a deal that would revolve around the Flames re-acquiring Michael Cammalleri in exchange for Rene Bourque. Feaster put the talks on hold when Bourque was given a five-game suspension, but was contacted by Gauthier to resume the talks after Cammalleri generated controversy in Montreal when he was quoted by the media as saying that the Canadiens, standing 12th in the Eastern Conference at the time, had prepared and played "like losers." The Montreal Gazette suggested later that the comments, originally spoken in English, were misrepresented after they were translated to French by Réseau des sports then translated back to English. Though both teams denied the comments played a role in the deal, Montreal and Calgary finalized the trade one day later, while the Canadiens were playing a game against the Boston Bruins. Montreal was forced to remove Cammalleri from the game after the second period, creating widespread speculation across the league about where he was being traded to, while the deal could not be finalized until after Calgary's later scheduled game began so that Bourque would get credit for a game served on his suspension.

=== Player re-signings ===
Player	Date	Contract terms (in US dollars)
Curtis Glencross	May 16, 2011	Four years, $10.2-million
Brett Carson	June 9, 2011	Two years, $1.15-million
Henrik Karlsson	June 20, 2011	Two years, $1.725-million US
Alex Tanguay	June 25, 2011	Five years, $17.5-million
Anton Babchuk	July 4, 2011	Two years, $5-million
Brendan Mikkelson	July 14, 2011	One year, $721,900 US
Brendan Morrison	July 15, 2011	One year, $1.25-million US

=== Trades ===
June 1, 2011	To Calgary Flames Roman Horak; 2nd-round pick in 2011; 2nd-round pick in 2011	To New York Rangers Tim Erixon; 5th-round pick in 2011
June 25, 2011	To Calgary Flames Chris Butler; Paul Byron	To Buffalo Sabres Ales Kotalik; Robyn Regehr; 2nd-round pick in 2012
July 9, 2011	To Calgary Flames Jordan Henry	To Florida Panthers Keith Seabrook
July 14, 2011	To Calgary Flames Pierre-Luc Letourneau-Leblond	To New Jersey Devils 5th-round pick in 2012
August 29, 2011	To Calgary Flames Lee Stempniak	To Phoenix Coyotes Daymond Langkow
January 6, 2012	To Calgary Flames Blair Jones	To Tampa Bay Lightning Brendan Mikkelson
January 12, 2012	To Calgary Flames Michael Cammalleri; Karri Ramo; 5th-round pick in 2012	To Montreal Canadiens Rene Bourque; Patrick Holland; 2nd-round pick in 2013
January 27, 2012	To Calgary Flames Brian Connelly	To Chicago Blackhawks Brendan Morrison
January 30, 2012	To Calgary Flames Akim Aliu	To Winnipeg Jets John Negrin

=== Additions and subtractions ===
Additions
Player	Former team	Via
Ben Walter	New Jersey Devils	Free agency
Clay Wilson	Florida Panthers	Free agency
Guillaume Desbiens	Vancouver Canucks	Free agency
Derek Smith	Ottawa Senators	Free agency
Scott Hannan	Washington Capitals	Free agency
Blake Comeau	New York Islanders	Waivers
Krys Kolanos	Abbotsford Heat	PTO

Subtractions
Player	New team	Via
Fredrik Modin	N/A	Retirement
Adam Pardy	Dallas Stars	Free agency
Matt Pelech	San Jose Sharks	Free agency
Steve Staios	New York Islanders	Free agency
Niklas Hagman	Anaheim Ducks	Waivers

== Draft picks ==
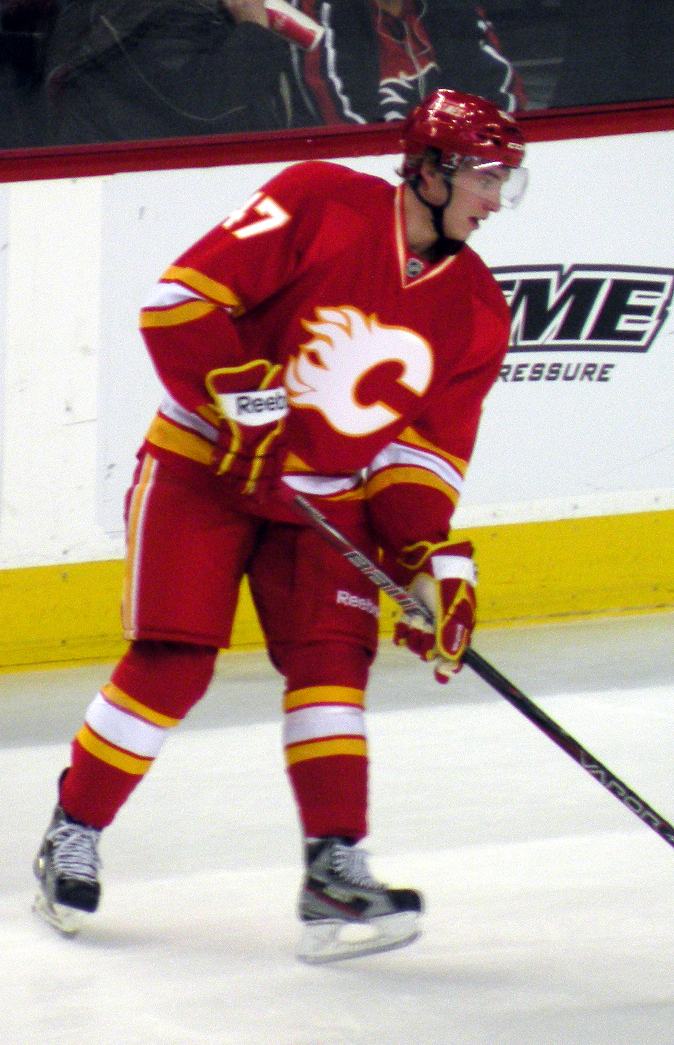
Baertschi made his NHL debut with the Flames in 2011–12 as an emergency recall from his junior team

The Flames entered the 2011 NHL entry draft with the 13th overall pick. With it, they chose Swiss forward Sven Baertschi from the Western Hockey League's Portland Winterhawks. He returned to Portland for the 2011–12 WHL season and was an offensive leader, averaging two points per game before a number of injuries late in the season in Calgary allowed the Flames to recall him on an emergency basis. Baertschi scored three goals in five games in Calgary before he was returned to the Winterhawks for the start of their playoffs.

Rnd	Pick	Player	Nat	Pos	Team (league)	NHL statistics				
Rnd	Pick	Player	Nat	Pos	Team (league)	GP	G	A	Pts	PIM
1	13	Sven Baertschi^{†}	Switzerland	LW	Portland Winterhawks (WHL)	69	10	20	30	26
2	45	Markus Granlund^{†}	Finland	C	HIFK (SM-liiga)	55	10	11	21	16
2	57	Tyler Wotherspoon^{†}	Canada	D	Portland Winterhawks (WHL)	15	0	4	4	4
4	104	Johnny Gaudreau^{†}	United States	LW	Dubuque Fighting Saints (USHL)	81	25	40	65	14
6	164	Laurent Brossoit^{†}	Canada	G	Edmonton Oil Kings (WHL)	1	0–1–0, 2.00 GAA			

Statistics are updated to the end of the 2014–15 NHL season. ^{†} denotes player was on an NHL roster in 2014–15.
