= Ludwig Blomstrand =

Swedish ice hockey player (born 1993)

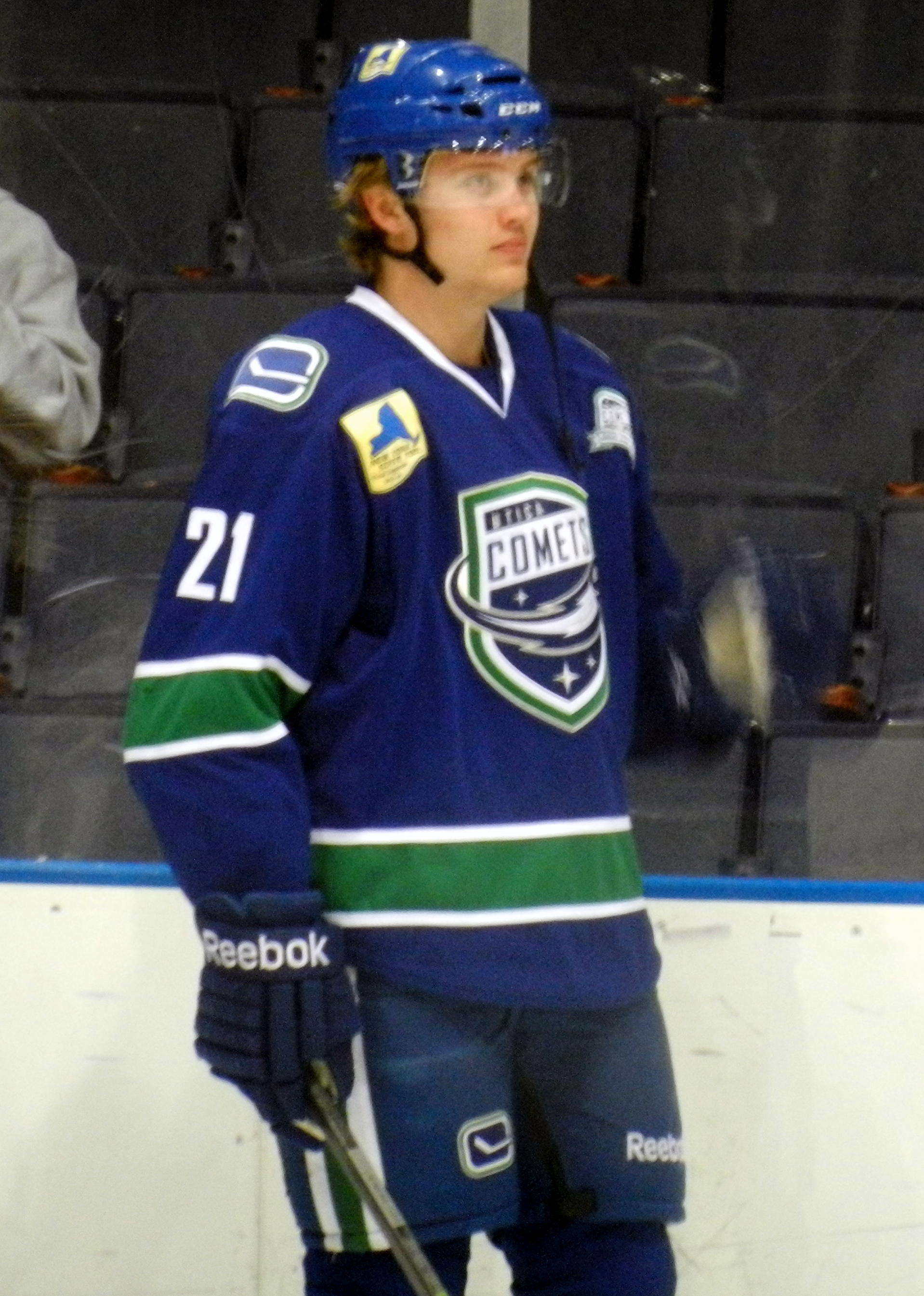
- Born: March 8, 1993 (age 33) Uppsala, Sweden
- Height: 6 ft 2 in (188 cm)
- Weight: 225 lb (102 kg; 16 st 1 lb)
- Position: Left wing
- Shoots: Left
- Allsv team Former teams: AIK; Djurgårdens IF; Chicago Wolves; Utica Comets; Karlskrona HK; HC Plzeň
- NHL draft: 120th overall, 2011; Vancouver Canucks
- Playing career: 2011–present

Medal record

Representing Sweden

Men's ice hockey

IIHF World U18 Championship
Silver medal – second place	2010 Belarus	

Ludwig Blomstrand (born March 8, 1993) is a Swedish professional ice hockey player who currently plays for AIK in the HockeyAllsvenskan (Allsv). He made his Elitserien debut on September 27, 2011, against Brynäs IF. He was selected by the Vancouver Canucks in the 4th round, 120th overall, of the 2011 NHL entry draft.

After completing his entry-level contract within the Canucks affiliates, Blomstrand was not tendered a qualifying offer to remain with Vancouver. As a free agent, Blomstrand opted to return to his native Sweden, securing a two-year contract in a return with second division club, Almtuna IS of the Allsvenskan on May 12, 2016.

== Career statistics ==
=== Regular season and playoffs ===
			Regular season					Playoffs
Season	Team	League	GP	G	A	Pts	PIM	GP	G	A	Pts	PIM
2010–11	Djurgårdens IF	J20	35	3	4	7	14	3	0	0	0	2
2011–12	Djurgårdens IF	J20	41	16	15	31	62	—	—	—	—	—
2011–12	Djurgårdens IF	SEL	18	0	1	1	4	—	—	—	—	—
2012–13	Djurgårdens IF	J20	7	2	1	3	0	—	—	—	—	—
2012–13	Djurgårdens IF	Allsv	14	0	0	0	8	—	—	—	—	—
2012–13	Almtuna IS	Allsv	30	6	19	12	2	—	—	—	—	—
2012–13	Chicago Wolves	AHL	8	1	1	2	2	—	—	—	—	—
2013–14	Utica Comets	AHL	7	0	0	0	2	—	—	—	—	—
2013–14	Kalamazoo Wings	ECHL	46	14	13	27	14	5	1	1	2	0
2014–15	Kalamazoo Wings	ECHL	53	33	12	45	32	5	2	1	3	4
2015–16	Kalamazoo Wings	ECHL	71	29	34	63	42	5	2	3	5	4
2016–17	Almtuna IS	Allsv	43	22	6	28	30	5	2	0	2	4
2017–18	Karlskrona HK	SHL	10	0	1	1	2	—	—	—	—	—
2017–18	Södertälje SK	Allsv	22	4	3	7	12	5	4	2	6	0
2018–19	Södertälje SK	Allsv	36	10	5	15	20	—	—	—	—	—
2019–20	Södertälje SK	Allsv	49	28	22	50	36	1	4	1	5	4
2020–21	Södertälje SK	Allsv	44	20	17	37	61	—	—	—	—	—
2021–22	HC Plzeň	ELH	51	22	14	36	18	5	0	4	4	0
2022–23	HC Plzeň	ELH	35	7	7	14	8	5	0	0	0	0
2023–24	Södertälje SK	Allsv	44	10	15	25	6	4	0	0	0	0
2024–25	Nybro Vikings	Allsv	39	16	15	31	39	2	0	0	0	0
SHL totals			28	0	2	2	6	—	—	—	—	—
ELH totals			86	29	21	50	26	10	0	4	4	0

=== International ===
Year	Team	Event	Result	GP	G	A	Pts	PIM
2010	Sweden	U18	2nd place, silver medalist(s)	6	0	0	0	0
Junior totals				6	0	0	0	0
