= Joseph LaBate =

American ice hockey player (born 1993)

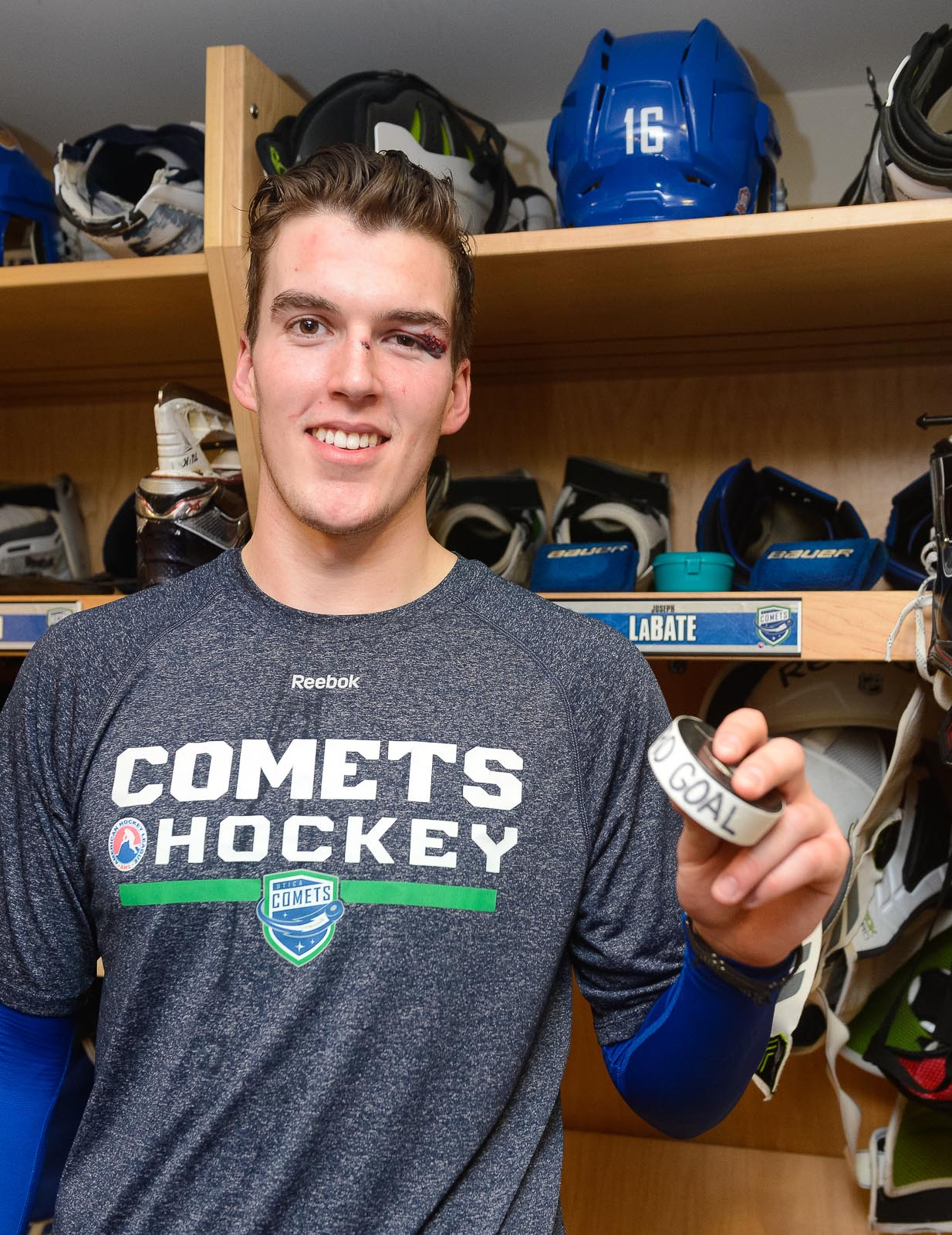
- LaBate in 2015
- Born: April 16, 1993 (age 33) Eagan, Minnesota, U.S.
- Height: 6 ft 5 in (196 cm)
- Weight: 210 lb (95 kg; 15 st 0 lb)
- Position: Center
- Shoots: Left
- NHL team Former teams: Free agent Vancouver Canucks; Barys Astana; Columbus Blue Jackets
- NHL draft: 101st overall, 2011; Vancouver Canucks
- Playing career: 2015–present

Joseph LaBate (born April 16, 1993) is an American professional ice hockey centre who is currently an unrestricted free agent. He most recently played for the Vancouver Canucks Organization while under contract to the Vancouver Canucks of the National Hockey League (NHL). He was selected 101st overall by the Canucks in the 2011 NHL entry draft.

== Playing career ==
LaBate played for the Academy of Holy Angels's men's ice hockey team in high school, tallying 58 points in 25 games.

After three seasons in high school hockey, the Vancouver Canucks used their fourth round pick, 101 overall, to select LaBate in the 2011 NHL entry draft. He soon moved on to college hockey, playing for the Wisconsin Badgers in the NCAA. LaBate shifted from wing to center in his junior season at Wisconsin and skated in all 37 games for the Badgers.

He scored a career-high 11 goals with 11 assists and was -3 with 22 penalty minutes. After four seasons with the Wisconsin Badgers, he signed a contract with the Canucks. He was sent down to the Utica Comets and posted his first professional career goal against the Lehigh Valley Phantoms after a gruesome fight with Samuel Morin. He participated in the Canucks 2016–17 preseason games, posting a goal, but was eventually sent down to the Comets.

On November 21, he was recalled to the NHL for the first time in his career. He made his NHL debut two days later, on November 23, 2016, logging 5:55 minutes of ice time in a 4–1 victory over the Arizona Coyotes. He played 13 total games with the Canucks. Following the 2017–18 season, and after his third full season within the Canucks organization, LaBate became a free agent after he was not tendered a qualifying offer by the club. On August 20, 2018, LaBate secured a one-year AHL contract with the Belleville Senators, affiliate of the Ottawa Senators.

Labate left the Belleville Senators following the 2020–21 season, his third year with the club, and continued his career in the AHL by signing a one-year contract with the Milwaukee Admirals on July 29, 2021. In the following 2021–22 season, LaBate added a veteran presence to the Admirals forward group, adding 5 goals and 12 points through 56 regular season games. He appeared in a career-high 9 playoff games, adding 2 points.

As a free agent from the Admirals, LaBate was signed to a one-year contract with defending Calder Cup champions, the Chicago Wolves, on July 18, 2022, where he totaled 22 points in 53 games.

After 8 professional seasons in North America, LaBate signed as a free agent to a one-year contract with Kazakh-based club, Barys Astana of the Kontinental Hockey League (KHL) on July 4, 2023. Slotted as Barys first-line center, LaBate concluded the season notching 18 points through 49 regular season contests.

Returning to North America as a free agent, LaBate was signed to a PTO leading into the 2024–25 season, with the Cleveland Monsters of the AHL, the primary affiliate to the Columbus Blue Jackets, on October 8, 2024. Two months into the season on November 29, 2024, LaBate was signed to a one-year, two-way NHL for the remainder of the season with the Blue Jackets. He was recalled to the Columbus Blue Jackets on February 20, 2025 where he set a league record for longest number of days between NHL games played at 2,886 days or 7 years, 10 months and 25 days, making him one of the best journeymen to ever play in the show.

On July 1, 2025, Labate signed a one year, two-way contract returning to his original NHL club, the Vancouver Canucks. This was another modern day league record for the 6’5 journeyman with 8 years, 6 months and 23 days going by since he spent time in Canucks colors. He spent time with both the NHL team and AHL team before his season ended prematurely in December of 2025 due to an unknown injury yet to be confirmed by the Vancouver Canucks.

== Playing style ==
LaBate described himself as:

I would say that I am somewhere in the middle at this point of my career. But I am honestly putting a large emphasis on becoming a more physical player. I am working on the physical aspect of the game, and watching David Backes [who I referred to as a player that he has been compared to] play, you can tell that he plays with a physical edge on the ice. That's something that I'm trying to incorporate into my game. I skated with Ryan Malone this past summer, and I have started watching more of his stuff as well.

== Career statistics ==
			Regular season					Playoffs
Season	Team	League	GP	G	A	Pts	PIM	GP	G	A	Pts	PIM
2009–10	Academy of Holy Angels	USHS	25	29	29	58	26	2	0	1	1	2
2010–11	Academy of Holy Angels	USHS	25	27	22	49	42	1	2	1	3	0
2011–12	University of Wisconsin	WCHA	37	5	15	20	24	—	—	—	—	—
2012–13	University of Wisconsin	WCHA	41	9	14	23	51	—	—	—	—	—
2013–14	University of Wisconsin	B1G	37	11	11	22	22	—	—	—	—	—
2014–15	University of Wisconsin	B1G	35	6	12	18	46	—	—	—	—	—
2014–15	Utica Comets	AHL	2	0	0	0	2	—	—	—	—	—
2015–16	Utica Comets	AHL	66	10	10	20	79	4	0	1	1	6
2016–17	Utica Comets	AHL	38	6	10	16	80	—	—	—	—	—
2016–17	Vancouver Canucks	NHL	13	0	0	0	21	—	—	—	—	—
2017–18	Utica Comets	AHL	39	6	5	11	87	—	—	—	—	—
2018–19	Belleville Senators	AHL	70	8	5	13	106	—	—	—	—	—
2019–20	Belleville Senators	AHL	47	10	16	26	53	—	—	—	—	—
2020–21	Belleville Senators	AHL	34	7	6	13	64	—	—	—	—	—
2021–22	Milwaukee Admirals	AHL	56	5	7	12	121	9	1	1	2	8
2022–23	Chicago Wolves	AHL	53	11	11	22	100	—	—	—	—	—
2023–24	Barys Astana	KHL	49	8	10	18	53	—	—	—	—	—
2024–25	Cleveland Monsters	AHL	51	8	13	21	81	6	1	1	2	17
2024–25	Columbus Blue Jackets	NHL	6	0	1	1	10	—	—	—	—	—
2025–26	Abbotsford Canucks	AHL	23	6	4	10	64	—	—	—	—	—
2025–26	Vancouver Canucks	NHL	1	0	0	0	0	—	—	—	—	—
NHL totals			20	0	1	1	31	—	—	—	—	—
