= Frank Corrado =

Canadian ice hockey player (b. 1993)

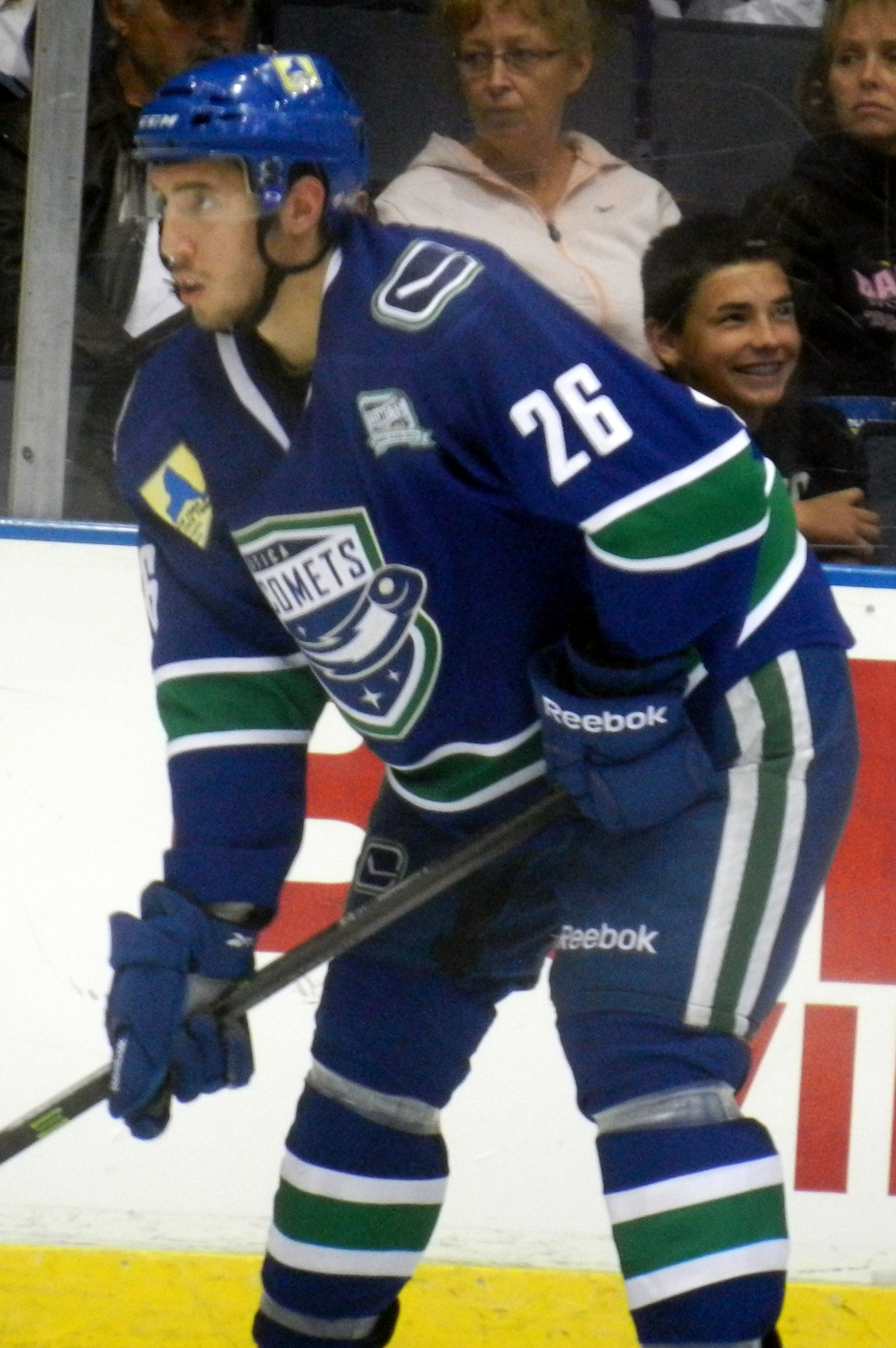
- Corrado with the Utica Comets in 2013
- Born: 26 March 1993 (age 33) Woodbridge, Ontario, Canada
- Height: 6 ft 0 in (183 cm)
- Weight: 205 lb (93 kg; 14 st 9 lb)
- Position: Defenceman
- Shot: Right
- Played for: Vancouver Canucks; Toronto Maple Leafs; Pittsburgh Penguins; Modo Hockey; Dinamo Riga
- NHL draft: 150th overall, 2011; Vancouver Canucks
- Playing career: 2012–2021

Francesco Corrado (born 26 March 1993) is a Canadian former professional ice hockey defenceman. He was selected by the Vancouver Canucks in the fifth round, 150th overall, of the 2011 NHL entry draft. Corrado made his NHL debut for the Canucks during the 2012-13 season. He also played for the Toronto Maple Leafs and Pittsburgh Penguins.

Since retiring as a professional player in 2021, Corrado has become a broadcaster and television hockey analyst. Known as Frank during his playing days, Corrado now goes by the moniker "Frankie," which he is known by professionally in his broadcasting capacity.

== Playing career ==
=== Junior ===
Corrado played with the Vaughan Kings minor midget AAA team in the GTHL during the 2008–09 season where he scored 15 goals and added 33 assists in 62 games. He was selected by the Sudbury Wolves in the second round, 25th overall, in the OHL Priority Draft.

In his rookie season in the Ontario Hockey League, Corrado played in 63 games, scoring 1 goal. He followed that up by playing 67 of 68 regular season games in the following season. His offensive output more than tripled as he registered 4 goals and 30 points. He then added another goal and four assists in eight playoff games.

Corrado was selected by the Vancouver Canucks in the fifth round, 150th overall, in the 2011 NHL entry draft. After a successful first NHL training camp with the Canucks, Corrado signed his 3-year entry-level contract with the Canucks on 23 September 2011 before being returned to Sudbury.

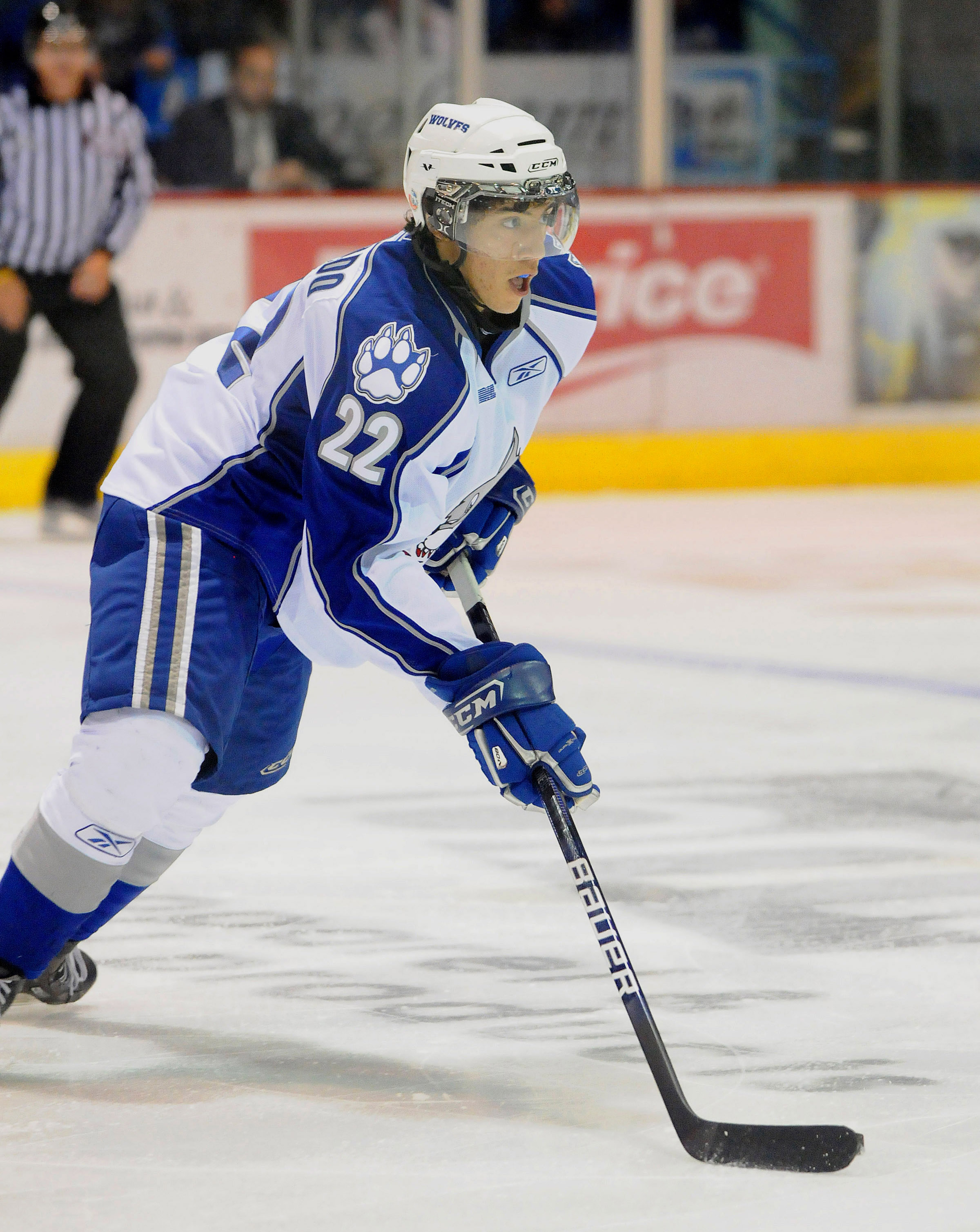
Corrado with the Sudbury Wolves in 2010.

Corrado made his professional hockey debut on 7 April 2012 with the Chicago Wolves after Sudbury was eliminated from the OHL playoffs. Corrado appeared in four regular season games, registering one assist. He also played in two playoff games before Chicago was eliminated from the playoffs by San Antonio.

On 8 January 2013, Frank Corrado was traded from the Sudbury Wolves to the Kitchener Rangers. On 15 April 2013, Corrado was assigned to the Chicago Wolves.

=== Professional ===
==== Vancouver Canucks ====
On 22 April 2013, Corrado made his NHL debut against the Chicago Blackhawks. He logged 17:20 of ice time and had three hits. The Canucks kept Corrado for their opening round playoff sweep by the San Jose Sharks, thus eating the first year of his Entry Level Contract.

He scored his first career NHL goal on 14 April 2014 on a wrist shot against goaltender Karri Rämö of the Calgary Flames.

==== Toronto Maple Leafs ====
On 5 October 2015, the Canucks placed Corrado on waivers. He was claimed by the Toronto Maple Leafs the following day. When commenting on the matter, Corrado said it was a "dream come true" to play for his hometown team. Corrado would however remain a healthy scratch for 10 weeks, finally making his Toronto debut on 15 December 2015, in a 5–4 overtime loss to the Tampa Bay Lightning (Corrado had spent two weeks with the Marlies as part of a conditioning stint during this near 3-month span). This prolonged wait is likely attributed to the Maple Leafs' desire for Corrado to improve his strength in the gym, as well as an overabundance of defencemen on the roster.

On 25 July 2016, Corrado signed a 1-year, $600 000 with the Toronto Maple Leafs.

The 2016–17 campaign again saw Corrado a frequent healthy scratch, though this time he saw even less playing time. Corrado had played just one game by the new year, admitting he was frustrated with his role as the team's "bench warmer." In mid December, Corrado made controversial comments stating that he wasn't playing because head coach Mike Babcock wasn't fond of him, though general manager Lou Lamoriello did comfort him on the situation. The comments brought return remarks from Babcock and significant fan and media attention to Corrado's situation, sparking a "Free Corrado" social media campaign. In an effort to receive more playing time, he was loaned to the Marlies for a seven-game conditioning stint. Corrado would play one more game on 19 January (due to an injury to Morgan Rielly), but a poor performance resulted in him being a further healthy scratch. On 4 February, following the acquisition of fellow right handed defenceman Alexei Marchenko via waivers, the Maple Leafs placed Corrado on waivers for the purpose of sending him to the AHL. General manager Lou Lamoriello stated he hoped Corrado was selected off waivers, saying he deserved an opportunity to play in the NHL. However, he cleared the following day.

==== Pittsburgh Penguins ====
Corrado played with the Marlies until the 1 March NHL Trade Deadline, where he was sent to the Pittsburgh Penguins in exchange for Eric Fehr, Steven Oleksy and a 2017 fourth round pick. He was directly assigned to AHL affiliate, the Wilkes-Barre/Scranton Penguins. On 7 December 2017, he was recalled from the Wilkes-Barre/Scranton Penguins to replace Justin Schultz who was placed on Injured Reserve. Corrado's tenure in Pittsburgh was characterized by injury issues.

==== Return to AHL ====
At the conclusion of his contract with the Penguins, Corrado was not tendered a contract resulting in unrestricted free agent status. Corrado was un-signed over the summer and leading into the 2018–19 season, before opting to sign a standard AHL one-year playing contract in a return to the Toronto Marlies on 22 October 2018.

As an unsigned free agent the following off-season, Corrado continued his professional career in the AHL for the 2019–20 season, agreeing to a professional tryout contract with the Belleville Senators, affiliate of the Ottawa Senators, on 26 October 2019. He was later signed to a one-year AHL deal with the Senators, appearing in 36 games for 10 assists before the season was cancelled due to COVID-19.

==== Europe ====
As an impending free agent, Corrado opted to pursue a career abroad, agreeing to a one-year contract with Swedish club, Modo Hockey of the second tier HockeyAllsvenskan on 1 June 2020. In the following 2020–21 season, Corrado re-established his offensive acumen from the blueline, registering 4 goals and 17 points through 34 regular season games with Modo.

On 10 May 2021, Corrado left Sweden as a free agent, signing a contract with Latvian based club, Dinamo Riga of the KHL. In November 2021, after seven games with Riga, Corrado and the team mutually agreed to contract termination after Corrado discovered an injury.

== Broadcast sports analyst ==
Following his departure from professional hockey, Corrado became a hockey analyst with Canadian television sports network TSN.

== Personal life ==
Corrado is of Italian descent. Growing up, he was a fan of the Toronto Maple Leafs. In a November 2021 interview, Corrado stated that he still cheered for the team despite his mixed tenure with the club, and watches Maple Leafs games on television when he is able to.

== Career statistics ==
			Regular season					Playoffs
Season	Team	League	GP	G	A	Pts	PIM	GP	G	A	Pts	PIM
2009–10	Sudbury Wolves	OHL	63	0	0	0	0	4	0	1	1	0
2010–11	Sudbury Wolves	OHL	67	4	26	30	94	8	1	4	5	8
2011–12	Sudbury Wolves	OHL	60	3	23	26	81	4	0	0	0	12
2011–12	Chicago Wolves	AHL	4	0	1	1	0	2	0	0	0	0
2012–13	Sudbury Wolves	OHL	41	6	21	27	44	—	—	—	—	—
2012–13	Kitchener Rangers	OHL	28	1	17	18	45	10	1	1	2	6
2012–13	Chicago Wolves	AHL	3	0	2	2	0	—	—	—	—	—
2012–13	Vancouver Canucks	NHL	3	0	0	0	0	4	0	0	0	0
2013–14	Utica Comets	AHL	59	6	11	17	46	—	—	—	—	—
2013–14	Vancouver Canucks	NHL	15	1	0	1	4	—	—	—	—	—
2014–15	Utica Comets	AHL	35	7	9	16	31	18	1	0	1	24
2014–15	Vancouver Canucks	NHL	10	1	0	1	0	—	—	—	—	—
2015–16	Toronto Marlies	AHL	7	0	3	3	2	—	—	—	—	—
2015–16	Toronto Maple Leafs	NHL	39	1	5	6	26	—	—	—	—	—
2016–17	Toronto Maple Leafs	NHL	2	0	0	0	6	—	—	—	—	—
2016–17	Toronto Marlies	AHL	18	1	11	12	14	—	—	—	—	—
2016–17	Wilkes-Barre/Scranton Penguins	AHL	17	1	3	4	6	1	0	0	0	2
2016–17	Pittsburgh Penguins	NHL	2	0	0	0	2	—	—	—	—	—
2017–18	Wilkes-Barre/Scranton Penguins	AHL	32	1	13	14	18	—	—	—	—	—
2017–18	Pittsburgh Penguins	NHL	5	0	0	0	2	—	—	—	—	—
2018–19	Toronto Marlies	AHL	39	2	4	6	18	—	—	—	—	—
2019–20	Belleville Senators	AHL	36	0	10	10	18	—	—	—	—	—
2020–21	Modo Hockey	Allsv	34	4	13	17	24	—	—	—	—	—
2021–22	Dinamo Riga	KHL	7	1	2	3	2	—	—	—	—	—
NHL totals			76	3	5	8	40	4	0	0	0	0
