= Guillaume Desbiens =

Canadian ice hockey player (born 1985)

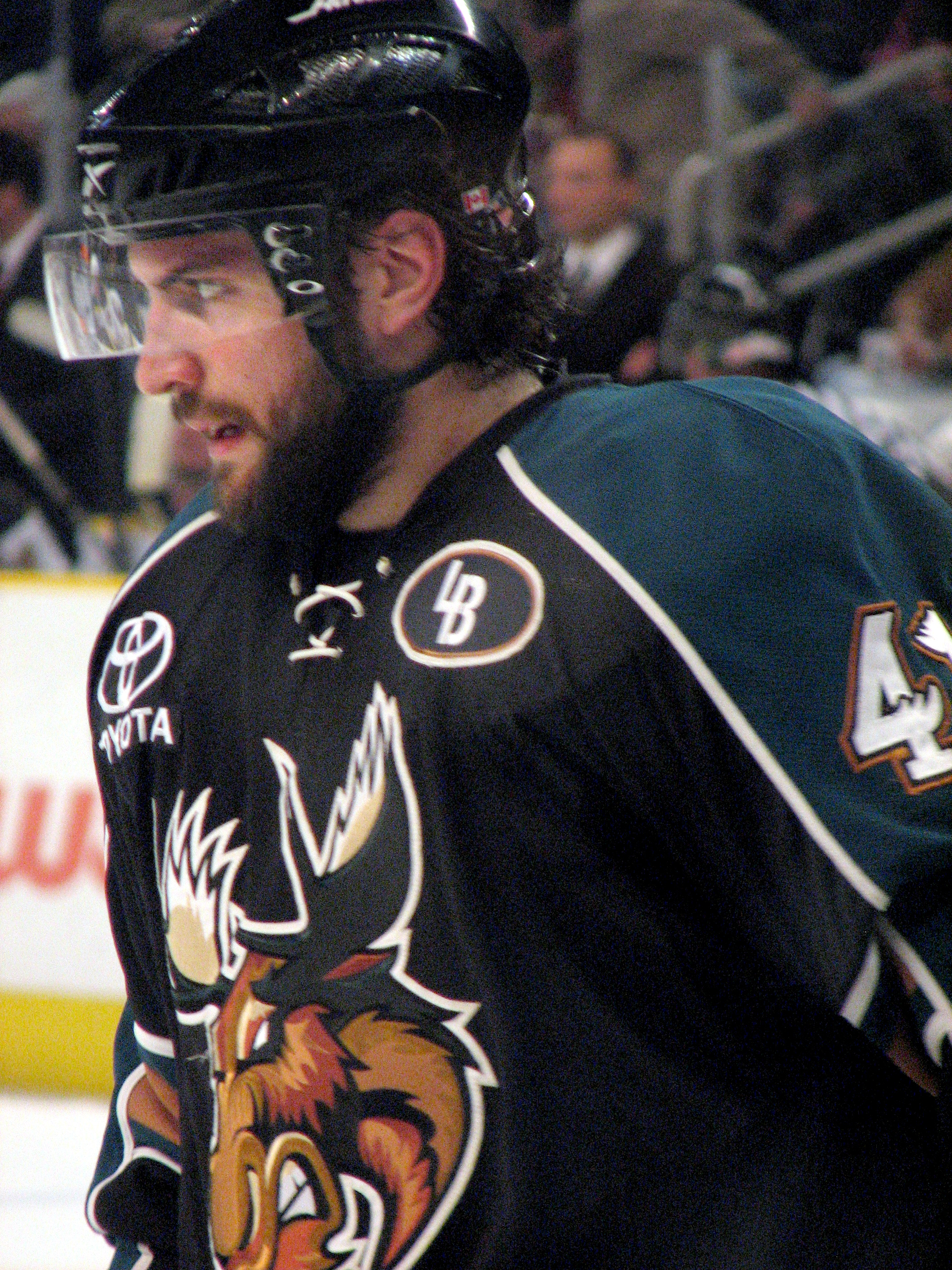
- Desbiens in 2009
- Born: April 20, 1985 (age 41) Alma, Quebec, Canada
- Height: 6 ft 2 in (188 cm)
- Weight: 210 lb (95 kg; 15 st 0 lb)
- Position: Right wing
- Shot: Right
- Played for: Vancouver Canucks; Calgary Flames; Dornbirner EC; HDD Olimpija Ljubljana; Sheffield Steelers
- NHL draft: 116th overall, 2003; Atlanta Thrashers
- Playing career: 2005–2017

Guillaume Desbiens (born April 20, 1985) is a Canadian former professional ice hockey right winger who played in the National Hockey League (NHL) with the Vancouver Canucks and Calgary Flames.

== Playing career ==
As a youth, Desbiens played in the 1999 Quebec International Pee-Wee Hockey Tournament with a minor ice hockey team from Rive-Sud.

Desbiens played major junior in the Quebec Major Junior Hockey League (QMJHL) with the Rouyn-Noranda Huskies for four seasons, being drafted 116th overall in the 2003 NHL entry draft by the Atlanta Thrashers after his second year with the Huskies. He turned pro in 2005–06, splitting the season between the Chicago Wolves of the AHL and the Gwinnett Gladiators of the ECHL. Despite having signed an NHL contract with the Thrashers, Desbiens did not suit up in any pre-season or regular-season games with Atlanta. He played in the Thrashers' farm system between the Wolves and Gladiators until the end of the 2007–08 season, when he was released by his NHL team.

Desbiens joined the Manitoba Moose of the AHL as a walk-on in 2008–09. Following his first season with the Moose, he was signed by their NHL affiliate, the Vancouver Canucks on July 22, 2009. Assigned to the Moose to start the 2009–10 season, he was recalled by the Canucks after an injury to Daniel Sedin and made his NHL debut with the Canucks on October 11, 2009. He played nine-and-a-half minutes on the third line with Kyle Wellwood and Tanner Glass in a 4–3 win against the Dallas Stars. After his one-game stint, he was sent back down to the Moose in favour of Michael Grabner.

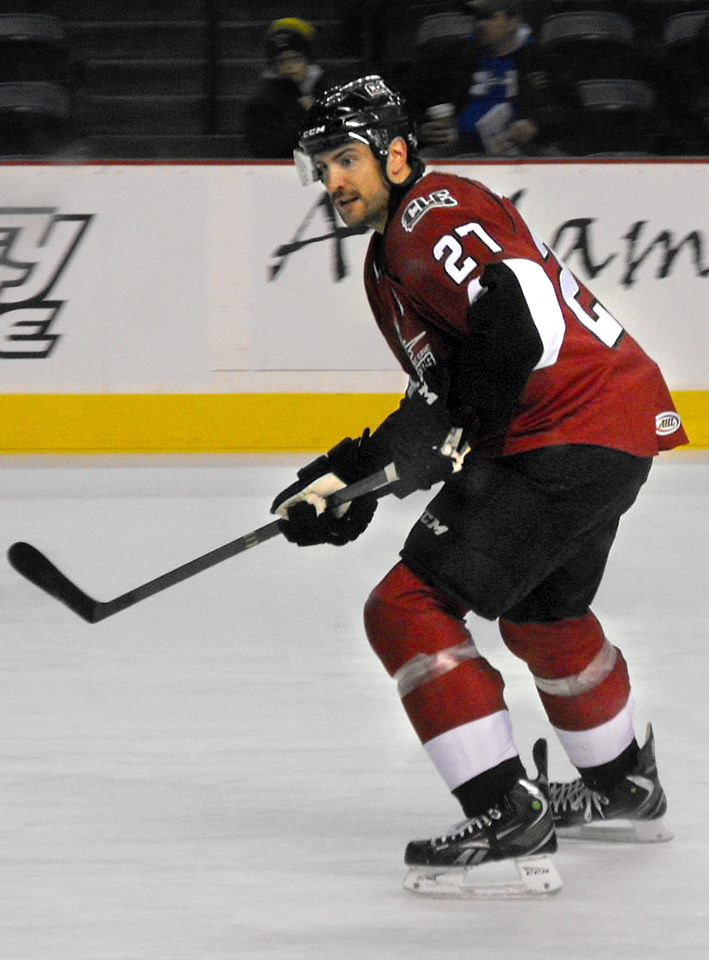
Desbiens with Lake Erie Monsters (2013).

After a training camp where he impressed the Canucks coaching staff, Desbiens made the Canucks' 2010-2011 opening night lineup. He played in every game until November 5, when he broke his hand, sidelining him indefinitely.

In the off-season, Desbiens left the Canucks organization and on July 4, 2011, signed a one-year two-way contract with rival the Calgary Flames. He was originally assigned to the Flames affiliate, the Abbotsford Heat to begin the 2011–12 season. Whilst leading the Heat in penalty minutes, Desbiens was recalled by the Flames and appeared in 10 games throughout the campaign to record 25 penalty minutes.

On July 30, 2012, Desbiens signed a one-year, two-way contract to return to the Vancouver Canucks organization. He was unable to add to his Canucks experience, as he was assigned directly to familiar affiliate, the Chicago Wolves, for the duration of the 2012–13 season, leading the Wolves with 118 penalty minutes.

Desbiens signed for his fourth NHL team on July 5, 2013, signing as a free agent to one-year, two-way deal with the Colorado Avalanche. After attending the Avalanche training camp, Desbiens was reassigned to AHL affiliate, the Lake Erie Monsters, to begin the 2013–14 season. In adding a veteran presence to the Monsters, Desbiens was selected as an Alternate captain and was primarily used in a bottom-six role in providing physicality. Desbiens failed to replicate the offensive presence from earlier in his career, scoring just 8 goals in 62 games but led the team with 200 penalty minutes.

Released as a free agent by the Avalanche at season's end, Desbiens opted to begin his European career in agreeing to a one-year deal with Austrian club, Dornbirner EC of the EBEL on August 1, 2014. After one season with Dornbirner, Desbiens opted to continue in the Austrian League, transferring on a one-year deal to Slovenian club, HDD Olimpija Ljubljana on July 30, 2015.

In the 2015–16 season, Desbiens went scoreless in 6 games with HDD before opting to leave the EBEL to sign with British club, Sheffield Steelers of the EIHL on November 22, 2015.

Despite signing a new two-year deal with Sheffield in the spring of 2017, Desbiens retired from hockey on May 22, 2017, after receiving a job opportunity back in Minnesota (where he lives). His final appearance for the Steelers was to help them beat Cardiff Devils to win the EIHL play-off final in April.

== Career statistics ==
| | | | Regular season | | | | | Playoffs |
| Season | Team | League | GP | G | A | Pts | PIM | GP | G | A | Pts | PIM |
|---|---|---|---|---|---|---|---|---|---|---|---|---|
| 2000–01 | Lévis Commandeurs | QMAAA | 40 | 9 | 14 | 23 | 92 | — | — | — | — | — |
| 2001–02 | Rouyn–Noranda Huskies | QMJHL | 65 | 14 | 10 | 24 | 115 | 4 | 1 | 1 | 2 | 9 |
| 2002–03 | Rouyn–Noranda Huskies | QMJHL | 64 | 15 | 18 | 33 | 233 | 4 | 0 | 0 | 0 | 4 |
| 2003–04 | Rouyn–Noranda Huskies | QMJHL | 58 | 20 | 21 | 41 | 199 | 11 | 2 | 2 | 4 | 24 |
| 2004–05 | Rouyn–Noranda Huskies | QMJHL | 56 | 27 | 16 | 43 | 206 | 10 | 1 | 4 | 5 | 25 |
| 2005–06 | Chicago Wolves | AHL | 3 | 0 | 0 | 0 | 7 | — | — | — | — | — |
| 2005–06 | Gwinnett Gladiators | ECHL | 65 | 33 | 27 | 60 | 187 | 17 | 10 | 6 | 16 | 38 |
| 2006–07 | Chicago Wolves | AHL | 54 | 3 | 6 | 9 | 118 | 6 | 0 | 1 | 1 | 2 |
| 2007–08 | Chicago Wolves | AHL | 23 | 2 | 1 | 3 | 30 | 1 | 0 | 1 | 1 | 0 |
| 2007–08 | Gwinnett Gladiators | ECHL | 10 | 2 | 5 | 7 | 46 | 8 | 3 | 6 | 9 | 10 |
| 2008–09 | Manitoba Moose | AHL | 78 | 21 | 26 | 47 | 158 | 22 | 4 | 8 | 12 | 18 |
| 2009–10 | Manitoba Moose | AHL | 67 | 19 | 15 | 34 | 144 | 6 | 3 | 6 | 9 | 17 |
| 2009–10 | Vancouver Canucks | NHL | 1 | 0 | 0 | 0 | 2 | — | — | — | — | — |
| 2010–11 | Manitoba Moose | AHL | 53 | 11 | 16 | 27 | 104 | 13 | 1 | 3 | 4 | 31 |
| 2010–11 | Vancouver Canucks | NHL | 12 | 0 | 0 | 0 | 10 | — | — | — | — | — |
| 2011–12 | Abbotsford Heat | AHL | 59 | 3 | 11 | 14 | 114 | — | — | — | — | — |
| 2011–12 | Calgary Flames | NHL | 10 | 0 | 0 | 0 | 25 | — | — | — | — | — |
| 2012–13 | Chicago Wolves | AHL | 52 | 4 | 4 | 8 | 118 | — | — | — | — | — |
| 2013–14 | Lake Erie Monsters | AHL | 62 | 8 | 6 | 14 | 200 | — | — | — | — | — |
| 2014–15 | Dornbirner EC | EBEL | 53 | 12 | 12 | 24 | 148 | — | — | — | — | — |
| 2015–16 | HDD Olimpija Ljubljana | EBEL | 6 | 0 | 0 | 0 | 6 | — | — | — | — | — |
| 2015–16 | Sheffield Steelers | EIHL | 29 | 7 | 16 | 23 | 96 | 2 | 1 | 0 | 1 | 2 |
| 2016–17 | Sheffield Steelers | EIHL | 52 | 8 | 15 | 23 | 130 | 4 | 2 | 0 | 2 | 2 |
| AHL totals | | | 451 | 71 | 85 | 156 | 993 | 55 | 9 | 19 | 28 | 89 |
| NHL totals | | | 23 | 0 | 0 | 0 | 37 | — | — | — | — | — |
