= Colton Gillies =

Canadian ice hockey player (born 1989)

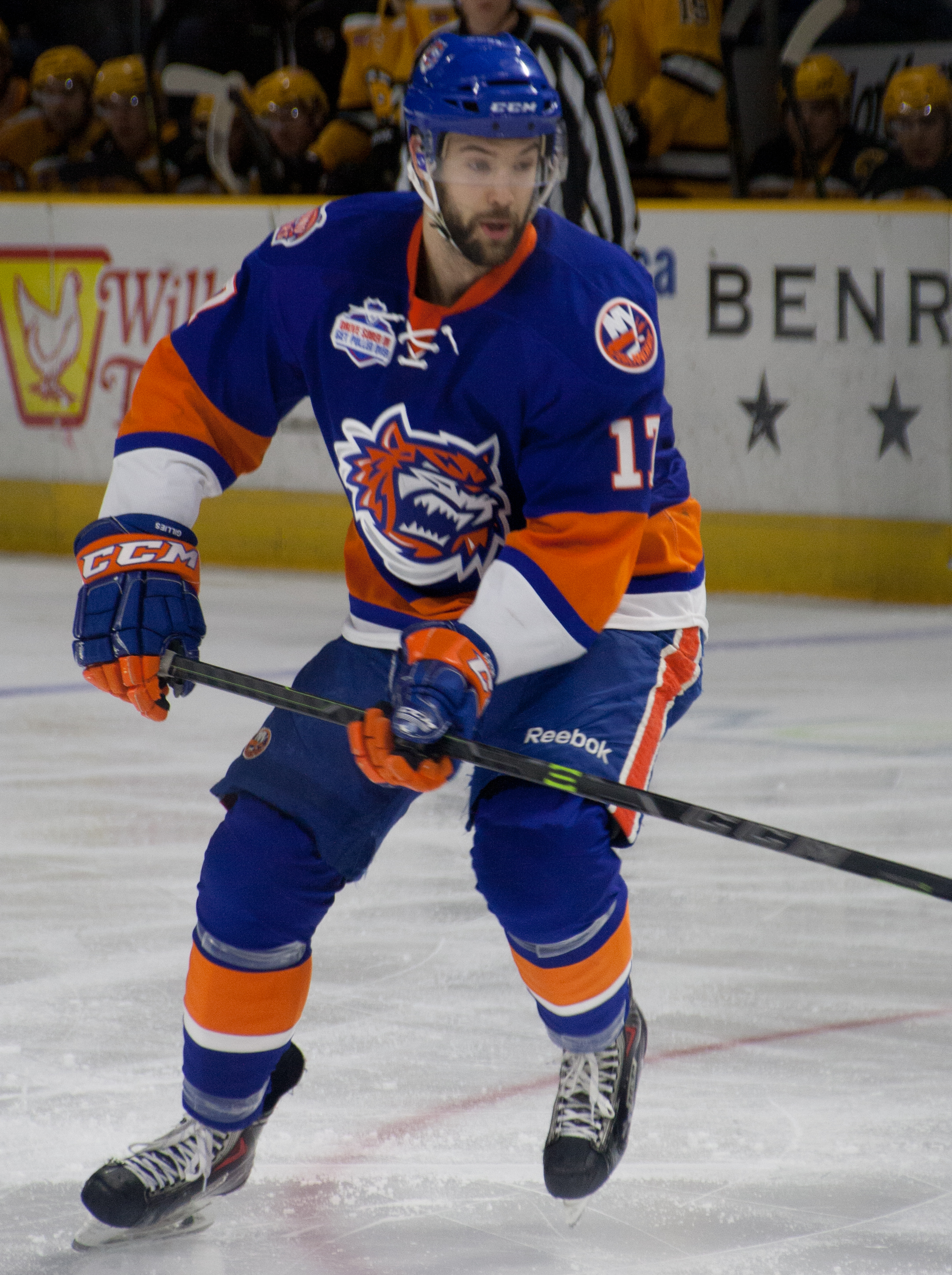
- Gillies with the Bridgeport Sound Tigers in 2015
- Born: February 12, 1989 (age 37) White Rock, British Columbia, Canada
- Height: 6 ft 4 in (193 cm)
- Weight: 209 lb (95 kg; 14 st 13 lb)
- Position: Left wing
- Shot: Left
- Played for: Minnesota Wild; Columbus Blue Jackets; HC '05 Banská Bystrica; Dinamo Riga
- NHL draft: 16th overall, 2007; Minnesota Wild
- Playing career: 2008–2021

Colton Gillies (born February 12, 1989) is a Canadian former professional ice hockey left winger. He spent time playing for both the Minnesota Wild and Columbus Blue Jackets in the NHL. Gillies spent the last five years of his professional career playing overseas, most notably spending time in the KHL playing for Dinamo Riga. He is the nephew of NHL hockey player Clark Gillies.

== Playing career ==
Gillies was the second overall pick by the Saskatoon Blades in the 2004 Western Hockey League (WHL) Bantam Draft. Gillies spent parts of four seasons with the Blades, but the team struggled and consequently Gillies played in only 10 playoff games during his major junior career. Still, he gained attention with his strong physical and two-way play, and was selected to represent Canada at the 2007 IIHF World U18 Championships in Finland, where Canada finished 4th overall.

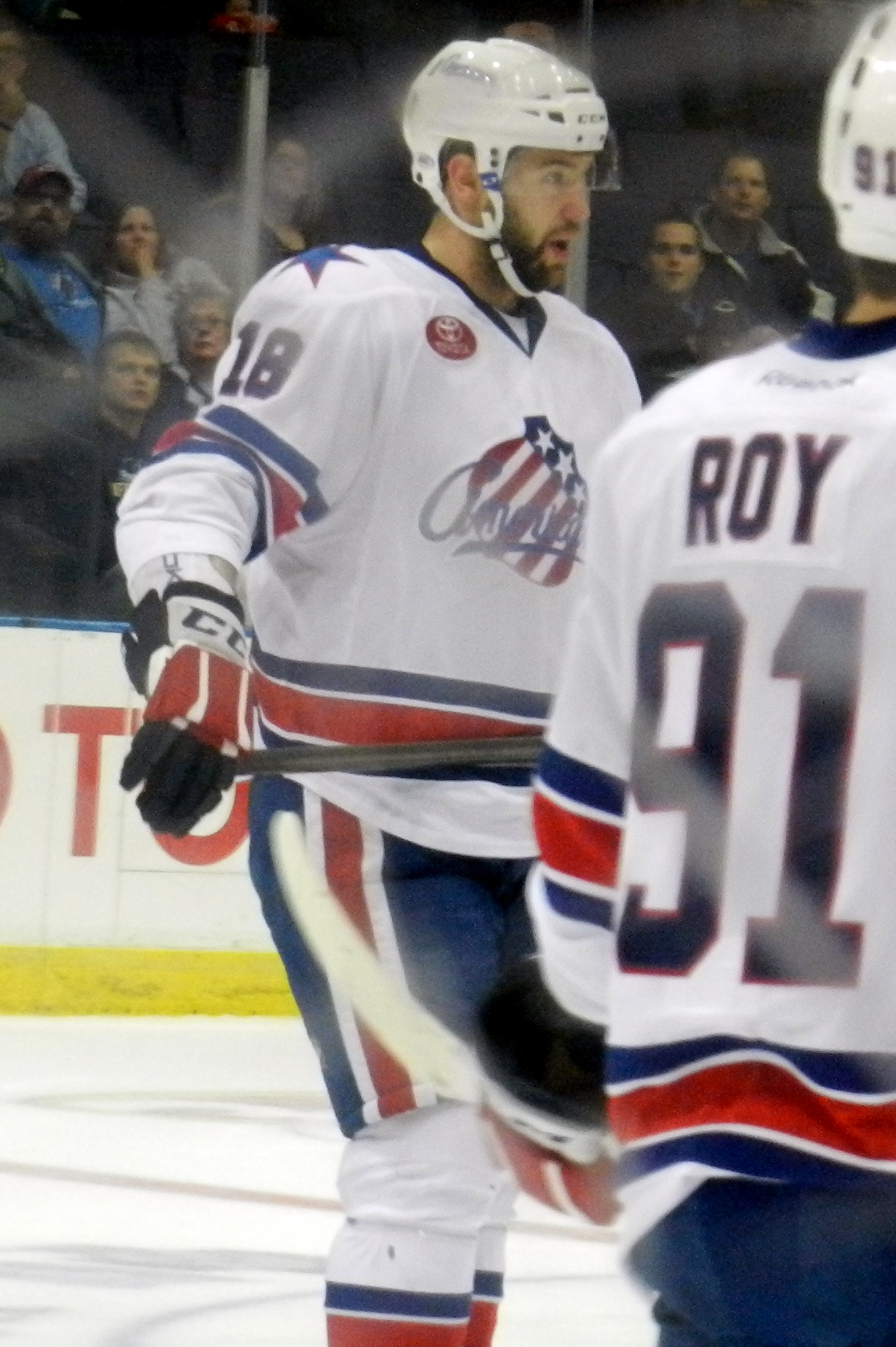
Gillies during his tenure with the Rochester Americans.

That summer he was selected in the first round of the NHL draft by the Minnesota Wild, who traded up three spots in the draft in order to pick Gillies 16th overall. Gillies was named captain of the Blades during the 2007-08 season and again represented his country at the 2008 World Junior Championships in the Czech Republic where he helped Canada to its fourth consecutive gold medal at the tournament.

Late in the 2007-08 season Gillies made his professional debut with the Wild's American Hockey League (AHL) affiliate, the Houston Aeros. He managed 8 points in 11 games with the team. That fall he cracked the Wild roster out of training camp and went on to play 45 games for the team during the 2008-09 season. Gillies recorded his first career point, an assist, on October 11, 2008 against the Boston Bruins, and his first career goal on December 19, 2008 against the New York Islanders.

Gillies spent the entirety of the 2009-10 season developing his game with the Aeros. Though he would remain with the Aeros for the majority of the 2010-11 season, Gillies was re-called by the Wild on April 3, 2011. He played the final 7 games of the season with Minnesota, contributing a goal in the last game of the season, a 5-3 victory over the Dallas Stars that ended the Stars' bid for the final playoff spot in the Western Conference.

On July 6, 2011, Gillies signed a two-year contract extension with the Wild. In the 2011–12 season, Gillies struggled to establish a role with the Wild, assisting on only 2 goals in 37 games before on January 13, 2012, he was placed on waivers. The following day he was claimed by the Columbus Blue Jackets.

A free agent approaching the 2013-14 season, Gillies accepted an invite to attend the Buffalo Sabres training camp. Unable to secure a contract with the Sabres he was reassigned to their AHL affiliate, the Rochester Americans training camp, on September 21, 2013. He was then signed to a one-year AHL deal with the Americans on September 25, 2013. He would compete for Rochester at the 2013 Spengler Cup.

As a free agent again in the off-season, Gillies participated in his second consecutive training camp on a try-out with the New York Islanders. Gillies was assigned to AHL affiliate, the Bridgeport Sound Tigers on a professional try-out to begin the 2014–15 season, before signing a one-year AHL deal on December 12, 2014.

Gillies played for HC Banska Bystrica in Slovakia during 2015-2016. After this, Gillies joined Dinamo Riga in the KHL for four seasons. Gillies retired from professional hockey in 2021 and accepted a coaching position with the Surrey Eagles of the BCHL.

== Personal ==
Gillies is also a firefighter, working in Penticton, British Columbia. He and his partner had their first child, a boy, in late 2021.

== Career statistics ==
=== Regular season and playoffs ===
			Regular season					Playoffs
Season	Team	League	GP	G	A	Pts	PIM	GP	G	A	Pts	PIM
2004–05	North Delta Flyers	PIJHL	44	9	17	26		6	2	1	3
2004–05	Surrey Eagles	BCHL	3	0	1	1	0	—	—	—	—	—
2004–05	Saskatoon Blades	WHL	9	1	1	2	10	2	0	0	0	0
2005–06	Saskatoon Blades	WHL	63	6	6	12	57	8	0	0	0	4
2006–07	Saskatoon Blades	WHL	65	13	17	30	148	—	—	—	—	—
2007–08	Saskatoon Blades	WHL	58	24	23	47	97	—	—	—	—	—
2007–08	Houston Aeros	AHL	11	1	7	8	4	5	0	0	0	2
2008–09	Minnesota Wild	NHL	45	2	5	7	18	—	—	—	—	—
2009–10	Houston Aeros	AHL	72	7	13	20	73	—	—	—	—	—
2010–11	Houston Aeros	AHL	64	11	15	26	82	24	7	5	12	32
2010–11	Minnesota Wild	NHL	7	1	0	1	2	—	—	—	—	—
2011–12	Minnesota Wild	NHL	37	0	2	2	10	—	—	—	—	—
2011–12	Columbus Blue Jackets	NHL	38	2	4	6	25	—	—	—	—	—
2012–13	Columbus Blue Jackets	NHL	27	1	1	2	17	—	—	—	—	—
2013–14	Rochester Americans	AHL	65	9	14	23	49	5	1	1	2	11
2014–15	Bridgeport Sound Tigers	AHL	70	5	8	13	72	—	—	—	—	—
2015–16	HC ’05 iClinic Banská Bystrica	Slovak	28	6	5	11	113	17	3	3	6	28
2016–17	Dinamo Riga	KHL	43	8	6	14	71	—	—	—	—	—
2017–18	Dinamo Riga	KHL	6	0	0	0	4	—	—	—	—	—
2018–19	Dinamo Riga	KHL	35	1	4	5	17	—	—	—	—	—
2019–20	Dinamo Riga	KHL	52	0	1	1	52	—	—	—	—	—
NHL totals			154	6	12	18	72	—	—	—	—	—
KHL totals			136	9	11	20	144	—	—	—	—	—

Medal record

Representing Canada

Ice hockey

World Junior Championships
Gold medal – first place	2008 Czech Republic	

=== International ===
Year	Team	Event	Result	GP	G	A	Pts	PIM
2006	Canada Pacific	U17	4th	6	2	4	6	10
2006	Canada	IH18	1st place, gold medalist(s)	4	1	0	1	18
2007	Canada	U18	4th	6	2	1	3	10
2008	Canada	WJC	1st place, gold medalist(s)	7	1	0	1	6
Junior totals				23	6	5	11	44

Awards and achievements
Preceded by James Sheppard	Minnesota Wild first-round draft pick 2007	Succeeded by Tyler Cuma
