= List of Minnesota Wild draft picks =

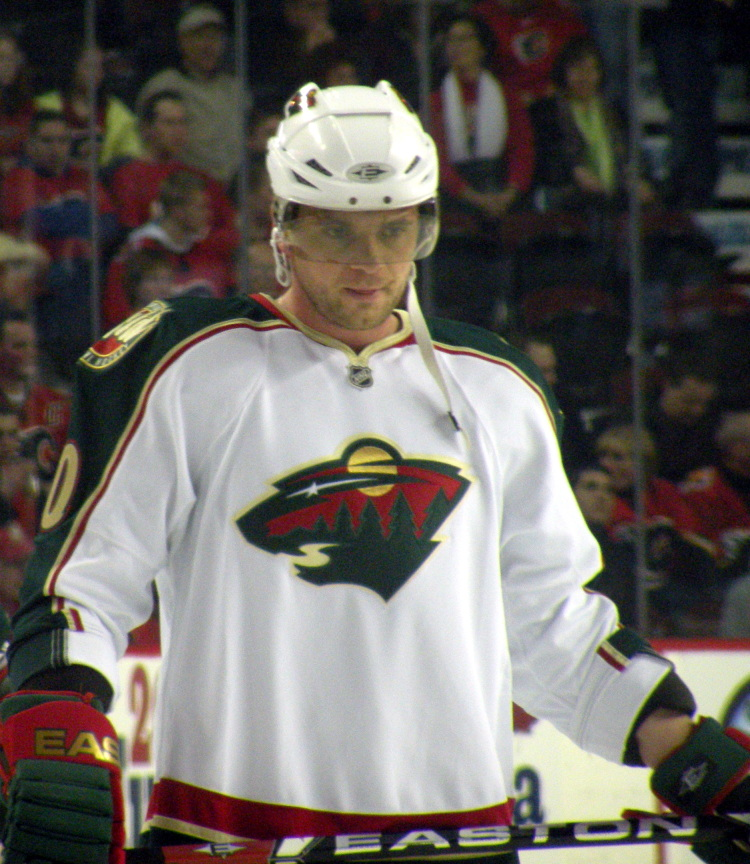
Marian Gaborik, selected third overall in 2000, was the first draft pick in franchise history.

This is a complete list of ice hockey players who were drafted in the National Hockey League Entry Draft by the Minnesota Wild franchise. It includes every player who was drafted, regardless of whether they played for the team.

== Key ==
Played at least one game with the Wild
Spent entire NHL career with the Wild

General terms and abbreviations
Term or abbreviation	Definition
Draft	The year that the player was selected
Round	The round of the draft in which the player was selected
Pick	The overall position in the draft at which the player was selected

Position abbreviations
Abbreviation	Definition
G	Goaltender
D	Defense
LW	Left wing
C	Center
RW	Right wing
F	Forward

Abbreviations for statistical columns
Abbreviation	Definition
Pos	Position
GP	Games played
G	Goals
A	Assists
Pts	Points
PIM	Penalties in minutes
W	Wins
L	Losses
OT	Overtime/shootout losses
GAA	Goals against average
—	Does not apply

== Draft picks ==
Statistics are complete as of the 2025–26 NHL season and show each player's career regular season totals in the NHL. Wins, losses, ties, overtime losses and goals against average apply to goaltenders and are used only for players at that position.

Draft	Round	Pick	Player	Nationality	Pos	GP	G	A	Pts	PIM	W	L	OT	GAA
2000	1	3	Marian Gaborik	Slovakia	LW	1035	407	408	815	492	—	—	—	—
2000	2	33	Nick Schultz	Canada	D	1069	30	145	175	483	—	—	—	—
2000	4	99	Marc Cavosie	United States	W	—	—	—	—	—	—	—	—	—
2000	5	132	Maxim Sushinski	Russia	RW	30	7	4	11	29	—	—	—	—
2000	6	170	Erik Reitz	United States	D	48	1	1	2	69	—	—	—	—
2000	7	199	Brian Passmore	Canada	C	—	—	—	—	—	—	—	—	—
2000	7	214	Peter Bartos	Slovakia	LW	13	4	2	6	6	—	—	—	—
2000	8	232	Lubomir Sekeras	Slovakia	D	213	18	53	71	122	—	—	—	—
2000	8	255	Eric Johansson	Canada	C	—	—	—	—	—	—	—	—	—
2001	1	6	Mikko Koivu	Finland	C	1035	206	505	711	592	—	—	—	—
2001	2	36	Kyle Wanvig	Canada	RW	75	6	9	15	94	—	—	—	—
2001	3	74	Chris Heid	Canada	D	—	—	—	—	—	—	—	—	—
2001	3	93	Stephane Veilleux	Canada	LW	506	50	56	106	348	—	—	—	—
2001	4	103	Tony Virta	Finland	RW	8	2	3	5	0	—	—	—	—
2001	7	202	Derek Boogaard	Canada	LW	277	3	13	16	589	—	—	—	—
2001	8	239	Jake Riddle	United States	LW	—	—	—	—	—	—	—	—	—
2002	1	8	Pierre-Marc Bouchard	Canada	C	593	110	246	356	190	—	—	—	—
2002	2	38	Josh Harding	Canada	G	151	0	2	2	6	60	59	11	2.45
2002	3	72	Mike Erickson	United States	RW	—	—	—	—	—	—	—	—	—
2002	3	73	Barry Brust	Canada	G	11	0	0	0	0	2	4	1	3.70
2002	5	155	Armands Berzins	Latvia	C	—	—	—	—	—	—	—	—	—
2002	6	175	Matt Foy	Canada	RW	56	6	7	13	48	—	—	—	—
2002	7	204	Niklas Eckerblom	Sweden	RW	—	—	—	—	—	—	—	—	—
2002	8	237	Christoph Brandner	Austria	LW	35	4	5	9	8	—	—	—	—
2002	9	268	Mikhail Tyulyapkin	Russia	D	—	—	—	—	—	—	—	—	—
2002	9	269	Mika Hannula	Sweden	F	—	—	—	—	—	—	—	—	—
2003	1	20	Brent Burns	Canada	D	1579	273	672	945	887	—	—	—	—
2003	2	56	Patrick O'Sullivan	United States	C	334	58	103	161	116	—	—	—	—
2003	3	78	Danny Irmen	United States	RW	2	0	0	0	0	—	—	—	—
2003	5	157	Marcin Kolusz	Poland	C	—	—	—	—	—	—	—	—	—
2003	6	187	Miroslav Kopriva	Czech Republic	G	—	—	—	—	—	—	—	—	—
2003	7	207	Georgi Misharin	Russia	D	—	—	—	—	—	—	—	—	—
2003	7	219	Adam Courchaine	Canada	D	—	—	—	—	—	—	—	—	—
2003	8	251	Mathieu Melanson	Canada	RW	—	—	—	—	—	—	—	—	—
2003	9	281	Jean-Michel Bolduc	Canada	D	—	—	—	—	—	—	—	—	—
2004	1	12	A. J. Thelen	United States	D	—	—	—	—	—	—	—	—	—
2004	2	42	Roman Voloshenko	Russia	LW	—	—	—	—	—	—	—	—	—
2004	3	78	Peter Olvecky	Slovakia	LW	32	2	5	7	12	—	—	—	—
2004	3	79	Clayton Stoner	Canada	D	360	7	41	48	459	—	—	—	—
2004	4	111	Ryan Jones	Canada	F	334	54	46	100	181	—	—	—	—
2004	4	114	Patrick Bordeleau	Canada	LW	129	8	8	16	185	—	—	—	—
2004	4	117	Julien Sprunger	Switzerland	RW	—	—	—	—	—	—	—	—	—
2004	5	161	Jean-Claude Sawyer	Canada	D	—	—	—	—	—	—	—	—	—
2004	6	175	Aaron Boogaard	Canada	RW	—	—	—	—	—	—	—	—	—
2004	7	195	Jean-Michel Rizk	Canada	RW	—	—	—	—	—	—	—	—	—
2004	7	206	Anton Khudobin	Russia	G	260	0	8	8	16	114	92	33	2.52
2004	9	272	Kyle Wilson	Canada	C	39	4	9	13	12	—	—	—	—
2005	1	4	Benoit Pouliot	Canada	LW	625	130	133	263	371	—	—	—	—
2005	2	57	Matt Kassian	Canada	LW	76	4	1	5	177	—	—	—	—
2005	3	65	Kristofer Westblom	Canada	G	—	—	—	—	—	—	—	—	—
2005	4	110	Kyle Bailey	Canada	C	—	—	—	—	—	—	—	—	—
2005	4	122	Morten Madsen	Denmark	C	—	—	—	—	—	—	—	—	—
2005	5	129	Anthony Aiello	United States	D	—	—	—	—	—	—	—	—	—
2005	7	199	Riley Emmerson	Canada	LW	—	—	—	—	—	—	—	—	—
2006	1	9	James Sheppard	Canada	C	394	23	68	91	192	—	—	—	—
2006	2	40	Ondrej Fiala	Czech Republic	LW	—	—	—	—	—	—	—	—	—
2006	3	72	Cal Clutterbuck	Canada	RW	1064	143	150	293	698	—	—	—	—
2006	4	102	Kyle Medvec	United States	D	—	—	—	—	—	—	—	—	—
2006	5	132	Niko Hovinen	Finland	G	—	—	—	—	—	—	—	—	—
2006	6	162	Julian Walker	Switzerland	W	—	—	—	—	—	—	—	—	—
2006	7	192	Chris Hickey	United States	C	—	—	—	—	—	—	—	—	—
2007	1	16	Colton Gillies	Canada	LW	154	6	12	18	72	—	—	—	—
2007	4	110	Justin Falk	Canada	D	279	3	30	33	219	—	—	—	—
2007	5	140	Cody Almond	Switzerland	C	25	2	0	2	26	—	—	—	—
2007	6	170	Harri Ilvonen	Finland	D	—	—	—	—	—	—	—	—	—
2007	7	200	Carson McMillan	Canada	RW	16	2	3	5	11	—	—	—	—
2008	1	23	Tyler Cuma	Canada	D	1	0	0	0	2	—	—	—	—
2008	2	55	Marco Scandella	Canada	D	784	51	119	170	294	—	—	—	—
2008	4	115	Sean Lorenz	United States	D	—	—	—	—	—	—	—	—	—
2008	5	145	Eero Elo	Finland	LW	—	—	—	—	—	—	—	—	—
2009	1	16	Nick Leddy	United States	D	1074	76	347	423	209	—	—	—	—
2009	3	77	Matt Hackett	Canada	G	26	0	0	0	0	4	17	2	3.11
2009	4	103	Kris Foucault	Canada	LW	1	0	0	0	0	—	—	—	—
2009	4	116	Alexander Fallstrom	Sweden	RW	—	—	—	—	—	—	—	—	—
2009	6	161	Darcy Kuemper	Canada	G	489	0	7	7	54	228	160	68	2.57
2009	6	163	Jere Sallinen	Finland	W	—	—	—	—	—	—	—	—	—
2009	7	182	Erik Haula	Finland	LW	840	167	208	375	447	—	—	—	—
2009	7	193	Anthony Hamburg	United States	C	—	—	—	—	—	—	—	—	—
2010	1	9	Mikael Granlund	Finland	C	960	198	453	651	295	—	—	—	—
2010	2	39	Brett Bulmer	Canada	LW	17	0	3	3	15	—	—	—	—
2010	2	56	Johan Larsson	Sweden	C	488	53	79	132	246	—	—	—	—
2010	2	59	Jason Zucker	United States	F	832	241	227	468	417	—	—	—	—
2010	6	159	Johan Gustafsson	Sweden	G	—	—	—	—	—	—	—	—	—
2010	7	189	Dylen McKinlay	Canada	RW	—	—	—	—	—	—	—	—	—
2011	1	10	Jonas Brodin	Sweden	D	915	62	216	278	278	—	—	—	—
2011	1	28	Zack Phillips	Canada	C	—	—	—	—	—	—	—	—	—
2011	2	60	Mario Lucia	United States	LW	—	—	—	—	—	—	—	—	—
2011	5	131	Nick Seeler	United States	D	453	15	57	72	337	—	—	—	—
2011	6	161	Stephen Michalek	United States	G	—	—	—	—	—	—	—	—	—
2011	7	191	Tyler Graovac	Canada	C	84	12	3	15	20	—	—	—	—
2012	1	7	Matt Dumba	Canada	D	748	85	176	261	558	—	—	—	—
2012	2	46	Raphael Bussieres	Canada	LW	—	—	—	—	—	—	—	—	—
2012	3	68	John Draeger	United States	D	—	—	—	—	—	—	—	—	—
2012	4	98	Adam Gilmour	United States	C	—	—	—	—	—	—	—	—	—
2012	5	128	Daniel Gunnarsson	Sweden	D	—	—	—	—	—	—	—	—	—
2012	6	158	Christopher Bertschy	Switzerland	C	9	0	1	1	8	—	—	—	—
2012	7	188	Louis Nanne	United States	LW	—	—	—	—	—	—	—	—	—
2013	2	46	Gustav Olofsson	Sweden	D	62	0	11	11	18	—	—	—	—
2013	3	81	Kurtis Gabriel	Canada	RW	51	2	3	5	153	—	—	—	—
2013	4	107	Dylan Labbe	Canada	D	—	—	—	—	—	—	—	—	—
2013	5	137	Carson Soucy	Canada	D	441	32	67	99	282	—	—	—	—
2013	6	167	Avery Peterson	United States	C	—	—	—	—	—	—	—	—	—
2013	7	197	Nolan DeJong	Canada	D	—	—	—	—	—	—	—	—	—
2013	7	200	Alexandre Belanger	Canada	G	—	—	—	—	—	—	—	—	—
2014	1	18	Alex Tuch	United States	RW	615	200	248	448	263	—	—	—	—
2014	3	80	Louis Belpedio	United States	D	16	2	4	6	0	—	—	—	—
2014	4	109	Kaapo Kahkonen	Finland	G	102	0	1	1	4	42	43	12	3.23
2014	5	139	Tanner Faith	Canada	D	—	—	—	—	—	—	—	—	—
2014	6	160	Pontus Sjalin	Sweden	D	—	—	—	—	—	—	—	—	—
2014	6	167	Chase Lang	Canada	RW	—	—	—	—	—	—	—	—	—
2014	6	169	Reid Duke	Canada	C	—	—	—	—	—	—	—	—	—
2014	7	199	Pavel Jenys	Czech Republic	RW	—	—	—	—	—	—	—	—	—
2015	1	20	Joel Eriksson Ek	Sweden	C	421	92	114	206	160	—	—	—	—
2015	2	50	Jordan Greenway	United States	LW	475	56	109	165	365	—	—	—	—
2015	4	111	Ales Stezka	Czech Republic	G	—	—	—	—	—	—	—	—	—
2015	5	135	Kirill Kaprizov	Russia	RW	397	230	245	475	175	—	—	—	—
2015	6	171	Nicholas Boka	United States	D	—	—	—	—	—	—	—	—	—
2015	7	201	Gustav Bouramman	Sweden	D	—	—	—	—	—	—	—	—	—
2015	7	204	Jack Sadek	United States	D	—	—	—	—	—	—	—	—	—
2016	1	15	Luke Kunin	United States	C	496	77	75	152	434	—	—	—	—
2016	4	106	Brandon Duhaime	United States	LW	375	33	37	70	410	—	—	—	—
2016	7	196	Dmitry Sokolov	Russia	LW	—	—	—	—	—	—	—	—	—
2016	7	204	Brayden Chizen	Canada	D	—	—	—	—	—	—	—	—	—
2017	3	85	Ivan Lodnia	United States	RW	—	—	—	—	—	—	—	—	—
2017	4	97	Mason Shaw	Canada	C	82	8	12	20	118	—	—	—	—
2017	4	116	Bryce Misley	Canada	C	—	—	—	—	—	—	—	—	—
2017	5	147	Jacob Golden	Canada	D	—	—	—	—	—	—	—	—	—
2017	6	178	Andrei Svetlakov	Russia	C	—	—	—	—	—	—	—	—	—
2017	7	209	Nick Swaney	United States	RW	1	0	0	0	0	—	—	—	—
2018	1	24	Filip Johansson	Sweden	D	—	—	—	—	—	—	—	—	—
2018	3	63	Jack McBain	Canada	C	316	44	63	107	282	—	—	—	—
2018	3	86	Alexander Khovanov	Russia	C	—	—	—	—	—	—	—	—	—
2018	3	92	Connor Dewar	Canada	C/LW	316	37	46	83	136	—	—	—	—
2018	5	148	Simon Johansson	Sweden	D	—	—	—	—	—	—	—	—	—
2018	5	155	Damien Giroux	Canada	C	1	0	1	1	2	—	—	—	—
2018	6	179	Shawn Boudrias	Canada	RW	—	—	—	—	—	—	—	—	—
2018	7	210	Sam Hentges	United States	C	—	—	—	—	—	—	—	—	—
2019	1	12	Matthew Boldy	United States	LW	361	144	185	329	178	—	—	—	—
2019	2	42	Vladislav Firstov	Russia	LW	—	—	—	—	—	—	—	—	—
2019	2	59	Hunter Jones	Canada	G	—	—	—	—	—	—	—	—	—
2019	3	75	Adam Beckman	Canada	LW	23	0	3	3	14	—	—	—	—
2019	5	149	Matvey Guskov	Russia	C	—	—	—	—	—	—	—	—	—
2019	6	166	Marshall Warren	United States	D	8	0	3	3	4	—	—	—	—
2019	6	172	Nikita Nesterenko	United States	C	61	7	10	17	10	—	—	—	—
2019	7	197	Filip Lindberg	Finland	G	—	—	—	—	—	—	—	—	—
2020	1	9	Marco Rossi	Austria	C	235	57	79	136	95	—	—	—	—
2020	2	37	Marat Khusnutdinov	Russia	C	168	21	28	49	42	—	—	—	—
2020	2	39	Ryan O'Rourke	Canada	D	—	—	—	—	—	—	—	—	—
2020	3	65	Daemon Hunt	Canada	D	45	0	7	7	6	—	—	—	—
2020	5	146	Pavel Novak	Czech Republic	RW	—	—	—	—	—	—	—	—	—
2021	1	20	Jesper Wallstedt	Sweden	G	40	0	1	1	2	20	12	6	2.72
2021	1	26	Carson Lambos	Canada	D	1	0	0	0	0	—	—	—	—
2021	2	54	Jack Peart	United States	D	—	—	—	—	—	—	—	—	—
2021	3	86	Caedan Bankier	Canada	C	—	—	—	—	—	—	—	—	—
2021	4	118	Kyle Masters	Canada	D	—	—	—	—	—	—	—	—	—
2021	4	127	Josh Pillar	Canada	C	—	—	—	—	—	—	—	—	—
2021	6	182	Nate Benoit	United States	D	—	—	—	—	—	—	—	—	—
2022	1	19	Liam Öhgren	Sweden	LW	97	11	14	25	4	—	—	—	—
2022	1	24	Danila Yurov	Russia	RW	73	12	15	27	28	—	—	—	—
2022	2	47	Hunter Haight	Canada	C	9	1	1	2	4	—	—	—	—
2022	2	56	Reiger Lorenz	Canada	LW	—	—	—	—	—	—	—	—	—
2022	3	89	Michael Milne	Canada	LW	1	0	0	0	0	—	—	—	—
2022	4	121	Ryan Healey	United States	D	—	—	—	—	—	—	—	—	—
2022	5	153	David Spacek	Czech Republic	D	2	0	0	0	0	—	—	—	—
2022	6	185	Servac Petrovsky	Slovakia	C	—	—	—	—	—	—	—	—	—
2023	1	21	Charlie Stramel	United States	C	—	—	—	—	—	—	—	—	—
2023	2	53	Rasmus Kumpulainen	Finland	C	—	—	—	—	—	—	—	—	—
2023	2	64	Riley Heidt	Canada	C	—	—	—	—	—	—	—	—	—
2023	5	149	Aaron Pionk	United States	D	—	—	—	—	—	—	—	—	—
2023	6	181	Kalem Parker	Canada	D	—	—	—	—	—	—	—	—	—
2023	7	213	James Clark	United States	LW	—	—	—	—	—	—	—	—	—
2024	1	12	Zeev Buium	United States	LHD	76	6	20	26	41	—	—	—	—
2024	2	45	Ryder Ritchie	Canada	RW	—	—	—	—	—	—	—	—	—
2024	4	122	Aron Kiviharju	Denmark	LHD	—	—	—	—	—	—	—	—	—
2024	5	140	Sebastian Soini	Finland	RHD	—	—	—	—	—	—	—	—	—
2024	5	142	Chase Wutzke	Canada	G	—	—	—	—	—	—	—	—	—
2024	6	174	Stevie Leskovar	Canada	LHD	—	—	—	—	—	—	—	—	—
2025	2	52	Theodor Hallquisth	Sweden	RHD	—	—	—	—	—	—	—	—	—
2025	4	102	Adam Benák	Czech Republic	C	—	—	—	—	—	—	—	—	—
2025	4	121	Lirim Amidovski	Canada	RW	—	—	—	—	—	—	—	—	—
2025	4	123	Carter Klippenstein	Canada	C	—	—	—	—	—	—	—	—	—
2025	5	141	Justin Kipkie	Canada	LHD	—	—	—	—	—	—	—	—	—
2026	3	83	Adam Andersson	Sweden	C	—	—	—	—	—	—	—	—	—
2026	4	112	Kayden Lemire	Canada	RW	—	—	—	—	—	—	—	—	—
2026	5	137	Filip Ruzicka	Czech Republic	G	—	—	—	—	—	—	—	—	—

Some draft picks who have played for the team

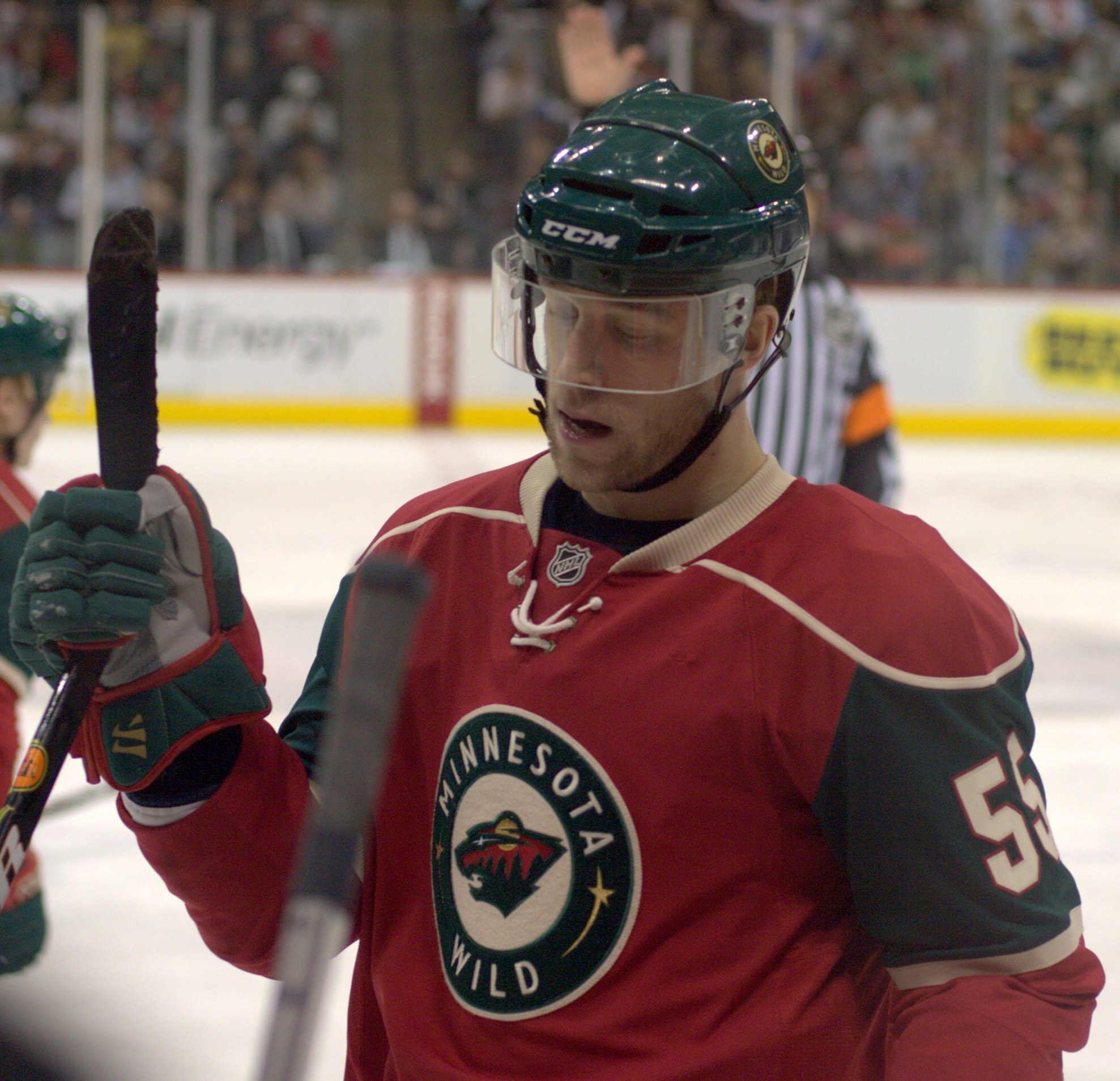
The Wild selected Nick Schultz 33rd overall in 2000.

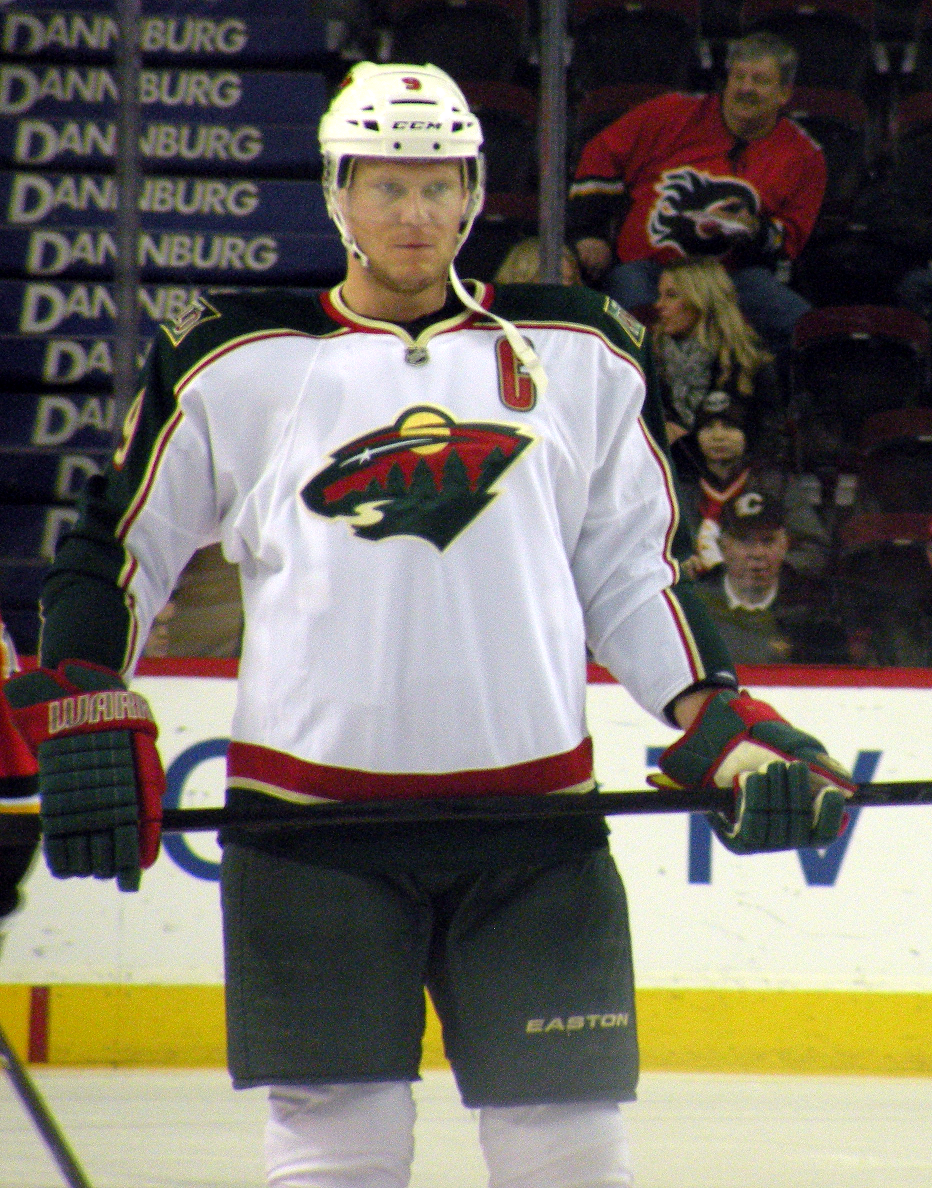
The Wild selected Mikko Koivu 6th overall in 2001.

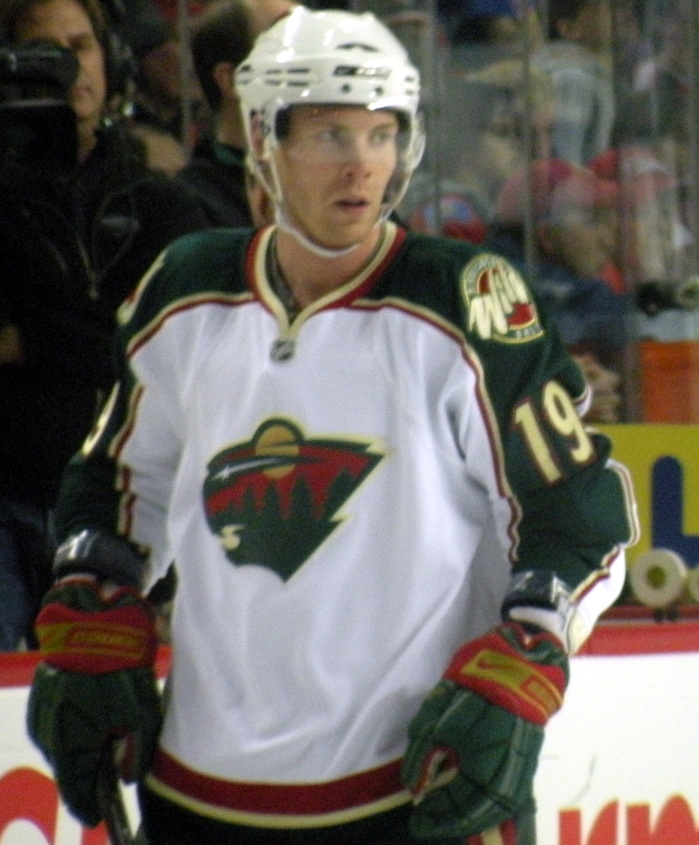
The Wild selected Stephane Veilleux 93rd overall in 2001.

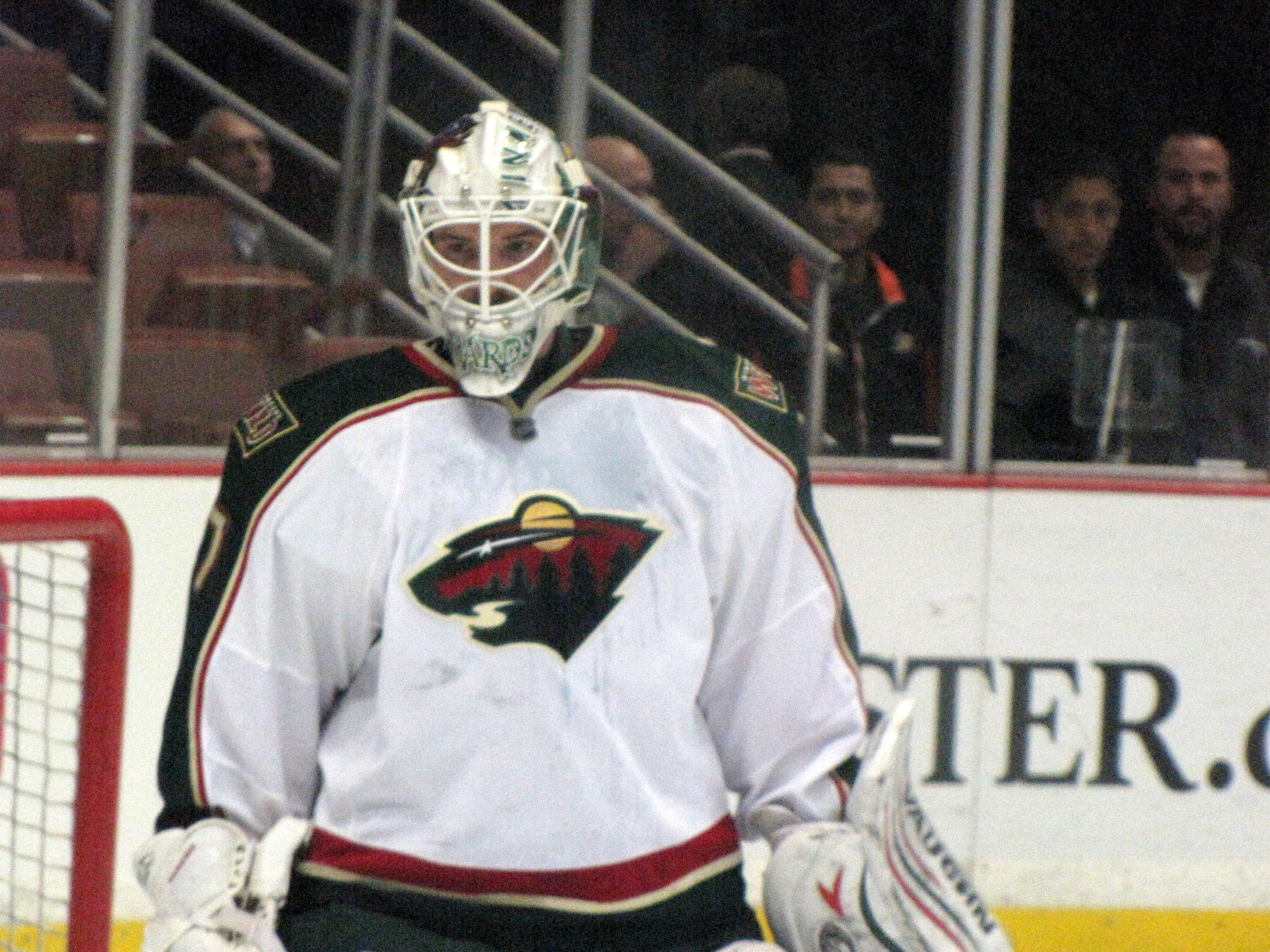
The Wild selected Josh Harding 38th overall in 2002.

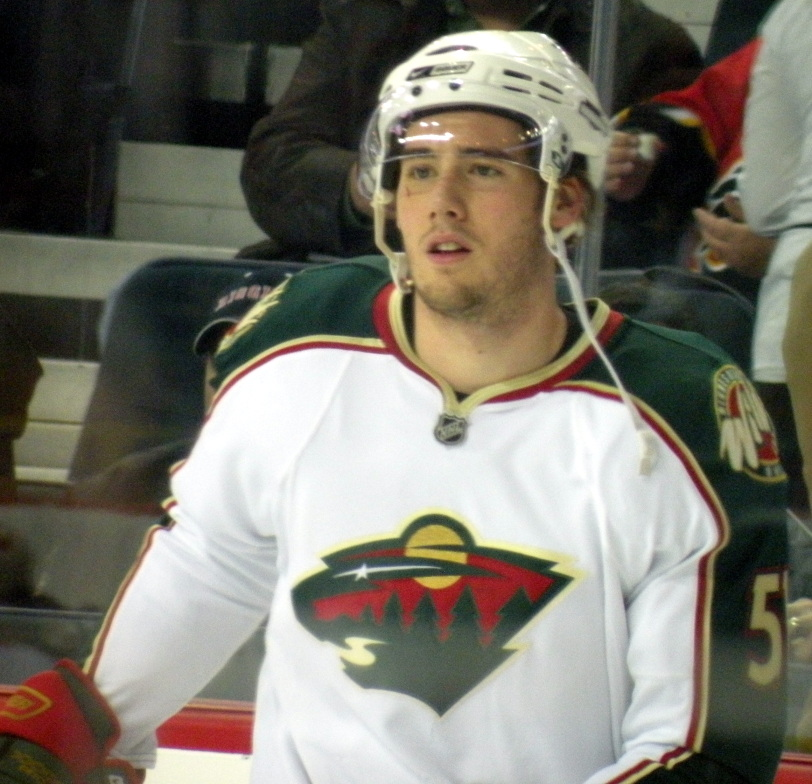
The Wild selected James Sheppard 9th overall in 2006.

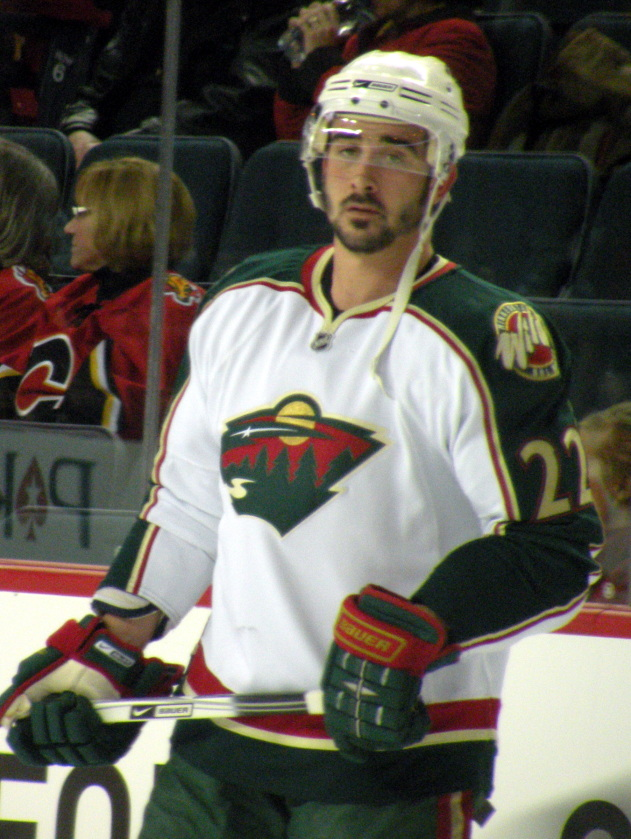
The Wild selected Cal Clutterbuck 72nd overall in 2006.

== See also ==
- 2000 NHL Expansion Draft
