= Benoît Pouliot =

Canadian ice hockey player (born 1986)

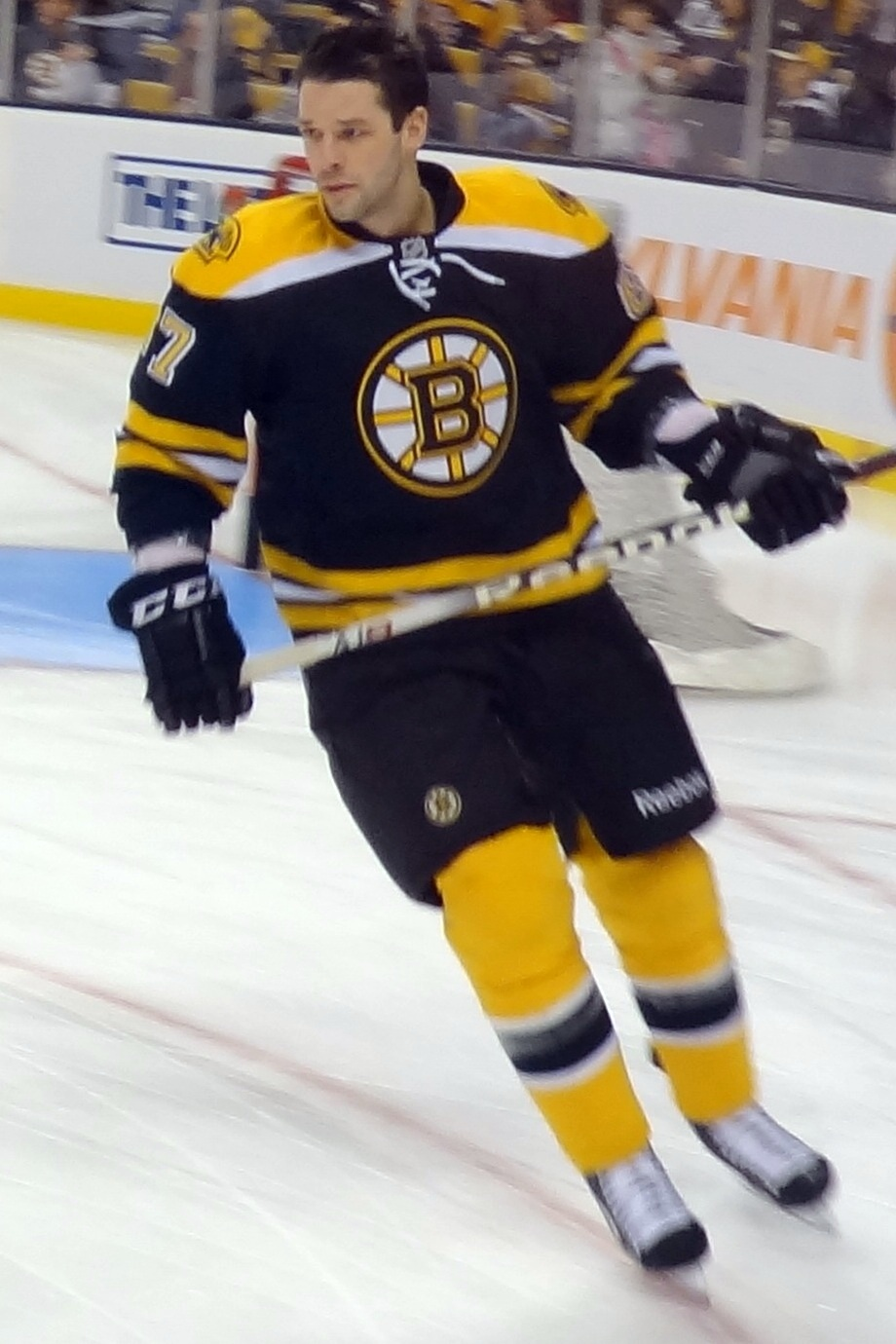
- Pouliot with the Boston Bruins in 2012
- Born: September 29, 1986 (age 40) Alfred, Ontario, Canada
- Height: 6 ft 3 in (191 cm)
- Weight: 193 lb (88 kg; 13 st 11 lb)
- Position: Left wing
- Shot: Left
- Played for: Minnesota Wild; Montreal Canadiens; Boston Bruins; Tampa Bay Lightning; New York Rangers; Edmonton Oilers; Buffalo Sabres
- NHL draft: 4th overall, 2005; Minnesota Wild
- Playing career: 2006–2018
Medal record
Representing Canada
Ice hockey
World Junior Championships
Gold medal – first place	2006 Vancouver

Benoît Robert Pouliot (born September 29, 1986) is a Canadian former professional ice hockey left winger who played in the National Hockey League (NHL) for 12 seasons. He played in the NHL with the Minnesota Wild, Montreal Canadiens, Boston Bruins, Tampa Bay Lightning, New York Rangers, Edmonton Oilers and the Buffalo Sabres. Pouliot was originally drafted by the Wild fourth overall in the 2005 NHL entry draft.

== Playing career ==
=== Amateur ===
Pouliot grew up in St. Isidore, Ontario, playing minor ice hockey for his hometown St. Isidore Eagles, where he was coached by his father Sylvain. Pouliot was later promoted to the AA Eastern Ontario Cobras of the ODMHA where he played up until the Bantam age level. He played in the 2000 Quebec International Pee-Wee Hockey Tournament with the Eastern Ontario team. He also saw time in Jr.B. with Les Castors de Clarence Creek.

Pouliot was later drafted in the 11th round, 207th overall, by the Ontario Hockey League (OHL)'s Sudbury Wolves in the 2002 OHL Priority Selection after playing for the Cobras. The following season, he was reassigned to the Hawkesbury Hawks Jr.A. club of the Canadian Junior Hockey League (CJHL), a team his father had previously played for.

In his first year, Pouliot won the Emms Family Award as the OHL's top rookie for 2004–05. On July 30, 2005, after his first full season of major junior hockey, he was drafted fourth overall by the Minnesota Wild at the 2005 NHL entry draft. Later that year, he was also named to the Canadian junior team that ultimately won the gold medal at the 2006 World Junior Ice Hockey Championships. He finished the 2005–06 season with 65 points in 51 games, including 35 goals.

=== Professional ===
Pouliot signed a tryout contract with Minnesota's American Hockey League (AHL) affiliate, the Houston Aeros, on April 28, 2006, playing there for two games in the team's Semifinal Calder Cup playoff series against the Milwaukee Admirals. He was then signed professionally to the Wild on May 1. He made his NHL debut later in the year, on November 22, against the Montreal Canadiens, after which he would return to the Aeros until March 15, 2008.

Pouliot scored his first two career NHL goals for Minnesota against Calgary Flames on March 22, 2008, though the Wild still lost the game, 5–4.

Pouliot later was placed on the 2008–09 roster at the beginning season. After scoring just 11 points in 37 games, Pouliot was later sent down to the AHL's Aeros. On November 23, he was traded to the Montreal Canadiens in exchange for Guillaume Latendresse.

On July 1, 2011, Pouliot signed as a free agent with the Boston Bruins on a one-year, $1.1 million contract. On June 23, 2012, as a pending unrestricted free agent, Pouliot's rights were traded to the Tampa Bay Lightning in exchange for forward Michel Ouellet and a fifth- round draft pick (131st overall) used later that day at the 2012 NHL entry draft to select Seth Griffith. Two days later, Pouliot signed a one-year, $1.8 million contract extension with the Lightning.

On July 5, 2013, again as a free agent, Pouliot signed a one-year, $1.3 million contract with the New York Rangers.

After a successful season with the Rangers and looking for term after playing on three successive one-year deals, Pouliot agreed to a five-year, $20 million contract with the Edmonton Oilers on July 1, 2014. During his first season with the Oilers in the 2014–15 season, Pouliot transitioned easily to the rebuilding club, increasing his scoring presence with 34 points in just 58 games. He was sidelined for 24 games however due to injury.

Despite the Oilers returning to the playoffs after a 10-year hiatus in the 2016–17 season, Pouliot endured a lackluster year with 14 points in 67 games regular season games, and no points in 13 playoff games. On June 29, 2017, Pouliot was placed on waivers in order for the Oilers to buy-out the remaining two-years of his contract.

On July 1, 2017, Pouliot was promptly signed by the Buffalo Sabres as a free agent, to a one-year $1.15 million deal.

== Personal ==
Pouliot's younger brother, Hugo, played for the same Hawkesbury Hawks Jr.A. team that Benoît and their father both played with.

The day after Pouliot scored his first-ever OHL goal in February 2004, his father died from leukemia.

== Career statistics ==
=== Regular season and playoffs ===
			Regular season					Playoffs
Season	Team	League	GP	G	A	Pts	PIM	GP	G	A	Pts	PIM
2002–03	Clarence Beavers	EOJHL	38	13	17	30	86	5	0	2	2	8
2002–03	Hawkesbury Hawks	CJHL	1	1	0	1	0	—	—	—	—	—
2003–04	Hawkesbury Hawks	CJHL	45	21	21	42	85	6	3	7	10	10
2003–04	Sudbury Wolves	OHL	4	2	2	4	0	4	2	1	3	0
2004–05	Sudbury Wolves	OHL	67	29	36	65	102	12	6	8	14	20
2005–06	Sudbury Wolves	OHL	51	35	30	65	141	8	8	3	11	16
2005–06	Houston Aeros	AHL	—	—	—	—	—	2	0	0	0	2
2006–07	Houston Aeros	AHL	67	19	17	36	109	—	—	—	—	—
2006–07	Minnesota Wild	NHL	3	0	0	0	0	—	—	—	—	—
2007–08	Houston Aeros	AHL	46	10	14	24	67	3	0	0	0	2
2007–08	Minnesota Wild	NHL	11	2	1	3	0	1	0	0	0	0
2008–09	Minnesota Wild	NHL	37	5	6	11	18	—	—	—	—	—
2008–09	Houston Aeros	AHL	30	9	15	24	20	20	1	7	8	28
2009–10	Minnesota Wild	NHL	14	2	2	4	12	—	—	—	—	—
2009–10	Montreal Canadiens	NHL	39	15	9	24	31	18	0	2	2	6
2009–10	Hamilton Bulldogs	AHL	3	1	2	3	4	—	—	—	—	—
2010–11	Montreal Canadiens	NHL	79	13	17	30	87	3	0	0	0	7
2011–12	Boston Bruins	NHL	74	16	16	32	38	7	1	1	2	6
2012–13	Tampa Bay Lightning	NHL	34	8	12	20	15	—	—	—	—	—
2013–14	New York Rangers	NHL	80	15	21	36	56	25	5	5	10	26
2014–15	Edmonton Oilers	NHL	58	19	15	34	28	—	—	—	—	—
2015–16	Edmonton Oilers	NHL	55	14	22	36	30	—	—	—	—	—
2016–17	Edmonton Oilers	NHL	67	8	6	14	34	13	0	0	0	4
2017–18	Buffalo Sabres	NHL	74	13	6	19	22	—	—	—	—	—
AHL totals			146	39	48	87	200	25	1	7	8	32
NHL totals			625	130	133	263	371	67	6	8	14	49

=== International ===
Year	Team	Event	Result	GP	G	A	Pts	PIM
2006	Canada	WJC	1st place, gold medalist(s)	6	0	5	5	14
Junior totals				6	0	5	5	14

== Awards and honours ==
Award	Year
OHL
First All-Rookie Team	2005
Second All-Star Team	2005
Emms Family Award	2005
CHL Rookie of the Year	2005

Awards and achievements
Preceded by Bryan Little	OHL Rookie of the Year; 2004–05	Succeeded by John Tavares
Preceded by Sidney Crosby	CHL Rookie of the Year; 2004–05	Succeeded by John Tavares
Preceded by A. J. Thelen	Minnesota Wild first-round draft pick 2005	Succeeded by James Sheppard
