= A. J. Thelen =

American ice hockey player (born 1986)

- Born: March 11, 1986 (age 40) Savage, Minnesota, U.S.
- Height: 6 ft 3 in (191 cm)
- Weight: 212 lb (96 kg; 15 st 2 lb)
- Position: Defense
- Shot: Left
- Played for: Houston Aeros; Kalamazoo Wings; Rochester Americans; Texas Wildcatters
- NHL draft: 12th overall, 2004; Minnesota Wild
- Playing career: 2006–2011

Anthony James "A. J." Thelen (born March 11, 1986) is an American former professional ice hockey defenseman. He was drafted by the Minnesota Wild in the 2004 NHL entry draft, selected 12th overall.

== Playing career ==
After playing for the U.S. National Under-18 Development Program in 2002–03, Thelen joined Michigan State University to play college hockey. After his freshman season in 2003–04, he was drafted in the first round, 12th overall, in the 2004 NHL entry draft by the Minnesota Wild. Following his sophomore season with Michigan State, however, he was dismissed by the league for rules infractions.

Accordingly, he joined the major junior Western Hockey League (WHL) with the Prince Albert Raiders. Upon completing his first season in the WHL, Thelen was assigned by the Wild to their American Hockey League (AHL) affiliate, the Houston Aeros, where he made his professional debut, playing in one game. The next season, in 2006–07, after missing some time due to a knee sprain, Thelen was traded by the Raiders to the Vancouver Giants, in exchange for defenseman John Flatters and prospect Nathan Deck, where he captured the 2007 Memorial Cup championship with the Giants as tournament hosts.

Unsigned by the Wild out of major junior, Thelen turned pro in the ECHL with the Texas Wildcatters, tallying 35 points in his rookie season.

In 2008–09, Thelen joined the Florida Everblades. During the 2009-10 ECHL season, Thelen was named to the ECHL All-Star Team and took part in the skills competition. Thelen won the Hardest Shot Competition with a shot of 101.9 mph. On February 13, 2010, Thelen would suffer another concussion, the third of his career. He attempted to come back a week later, but ended up sitting out the rest of the season due to post-concussion syndrome.

On September 17, 2010, Thelen signed with the Kalamazoo Wings, the ECHL affiliate of the NHL's New York Islanders

With back issues and a history of concussions, Thelen retired from hockey after the completion of the 2010-11 ECHL season at age 25.

== Career statistics ==
			Regular season					Playoffs
Season	Team	League	GP	G	A	Pts	PIM	GP	G	A	Pts	PIM
2001–02	Shattuck–Saint Mary's AA	Midget	51	22	17	39	42	—	—	—	—	—
2002–03	U.S. NTDP U17	USDP	20	4	1	5	8	—	—	—	—	—
2002–03	U.S. NTDP U18	USDP	3	0	0	0	0	—	—	—	—	—
2002–03	U.S. NTDP U18	NAHL	44	2	7	9	72	—	—	—	—	—
2003–04	Michigan State University	CCHA	42	11	18	29	50	—	—	—	—	—
2004–05	Michigan State University	CCHA	33	0	11	11	48	—	—	—	—	—
2005–06	Prince Albert Raiders	WHL	72	13	23	36	79	—	—	—	—	—
2005–06	Houston Aeros	AHL	1	0	0	0	2	—	—	—	—	—
2006–07	Prince Albert Raiders	WHL	23	4	8	12	53	—	—	—	—	—
2006–07	Vancouver Giants	WHL	30	4	5	9	35	22	1	7	8	18
2007–08	Texas Wildcatters	ECHL	63	7	28	35	70	4	0	1	1	2
2008–09	Florida Everblades	ECHL	34	3	14	17	27	10	0	1	1	14
2009–10	Florida Everblades	ECHL	48	8	18	26	52	—	—	—	—	—
2009–10	Rochester Americans	AHL	9	0	0	0	6	—	—	—	—	—
2010–11	Kalamazoo Wings	ECHL	65	6	23	29	32	19	4	8	12	12
AHL totals			10	0	0	0	8	—	—	—	—	—
ECHL totals			210	24	83	107	181	33	4	10	14	28

== Awards and honors ==
Award	Year
All-CCHA Rookie Team	2003-04
All-CCHA First Team	2003-04
CCHA Best Offensive Defenseman	2003-04
AHCA West Second-Team All-American	2003–04
CHL Memorial Cup	2007

Awards and achievements
Preceded by John-Michael Liles	CCHA Best Offensive Defenseman; 2003-04	Succeeded by Andy Greene
Sporting positions
Preceded by Brent Burns	Minnesota Wild first-round draft pick 2004	Succeeded by Benoit Pouliot
