= Tyler Cuma =

Canadian-Austrian ice hockey player

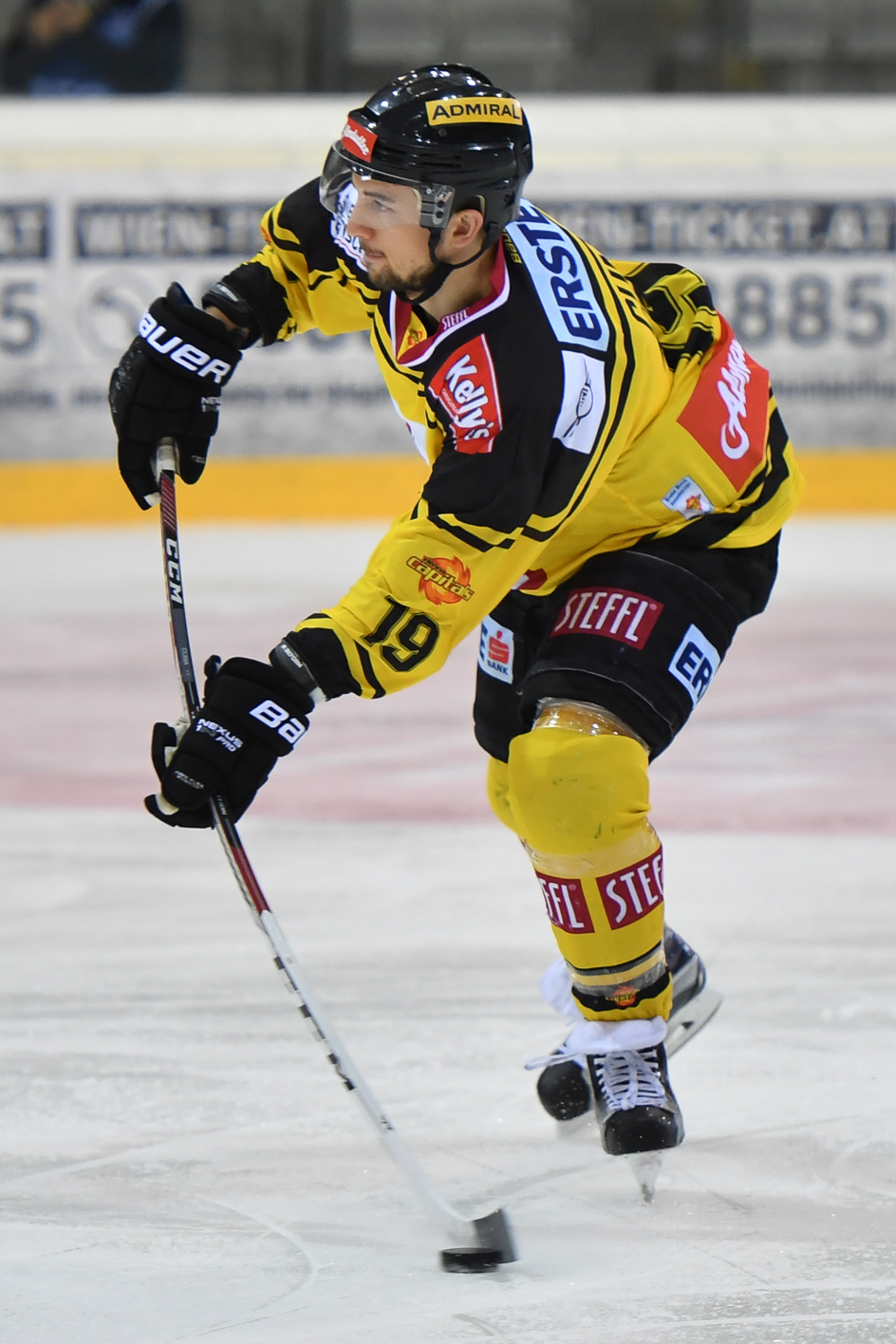
- Cuma with the Vienna Capitals in 2016
- Born: January 19, 1990 (age 36) Scarborough, Ontario, Canada
- Height: 6 ft 2 in (188 cm)
- Weight: 193 lb (88 kg; 13 st 11 lb)
- Position: Defence
- Shoots: Left
- ICEHL team Former teams: HC TWK Innsbruck; Minnesota Wild; Graz 99ers Vienna Capitals; Dornbirn Bulldogs
- NHL draft: 23rd overall, 2008; Minnesota Wild
- Playing career: 2010–present

Tyler Cuma (born January 19, 1990) is an Austrian-Canadian professional ice hockey defenceman currently playing for HC TWK Innsbruck of the ICE Hockey League (ICEHL). He was drafted by the Minnesota Wild in the first round, 23rd overall, in the 2008 NHL entry draft when he was playing for the Ottawa 67's.

== Playing career ==
=== Junior ===
Cuma began his major junior career in the OHL with the Ottawa 67's in 2006–07. He was drafted sixth overall in the 2006 OHL Priority Draft.

He recorded 19 (3 goals, 16 assists) points in his rookie season before improving to 32 (4 goals, 28 assists) points in 59 games in 2007–08. That year, he was named the 67's Top Scholastic Player and played in the OHL All-Star Game.

Cuma's 2008–09 season, his third with the 67's, was cut short after sustaining a knee injury during Team Canada's 2009 World Junior selection camp in December 2008. He appeared in just 21 games, scoring nine points. It was thought that he might have made the Minnesota Wild's roster that year.

Cuma's last year in the OHL was the 2009–10 season, where he got 22 points (5 goals, 17 assists) in 52 games.

=== Professional ===
Cuma's first AHL season was in 2010–11, when he played for the Houston Aeros. That year, he played 31 games, getting 4 points (1 goal, 3 assists) before suffering a knee injury in February.

In the 2011–12 season, Cuma played 73 games, getting 9 assists for the Houston Aeros. Cuma made his NHL debut in April, playing for the Minnesota Wild in a game against the Chicago Blackhawks, getting 2 PIM in 11 minutes on ice.

In 2012–13, Cuma spent the entire season with the Houston Aeros, playing in 42 games, getting 12 points (1 goal, 11 assists). He suffered a foot injury which caused him to miss a month.

As a free agent from the Wild, Cuma belatedly signed a trial contract into the 2014–15 season with Austrian club, the Graz 99ers of the EBEL on September 30, 2014. Cuma opted to remain in the EBEL the following season, although leaving Graz as a free agent to sign with rivals, the Vienna Capitals on October 5, 2015.

After sitting out the 2018–19 season, Cuma returned to the professional ranks, using his Austrian citizenship in obtaining a one-year non import contract with HC TWK Innsbruck of the EBEL on May 13, 2019.

Having another season long hiatus, Cuma extended his professional career for the 2021–22 season, returning to the ICEHL with the Dornbirn Bulldogs on July 10, 2021.

== International play ==
Cuma has represented Canada the 2008 IIHF World U18 Championships.

== Style of play ==
Cuma is a two-way defenseman, who has a slightly offensive bent.

== Career statistics ==
=== Regular season and playoffs ===
| | | | Regular season | | | | | Playoffs |
| Season | Team | League | GP | G | A | Pts | PIM | GP | G | A | Pts | PIM |
|---|---|---|---|---|---|---|---|---|---|---|---|---|
| 2006–07 | Ottawa 67's | OHL | 63 | 3 | 16 | 19 | 55 | 5 | 0 | 2 | 2 | 6 |
| 2007–08 | Ottawa 67's | OHL | 59 | 4 | 28 | 32 | 69 | 4 | 1 | 1 | 2 | 2 |
| 2008–09 | Ottawa 67's | OHL | 21 | 1 | 8 | 9 | 27 | — | — | — | — | — |
| 2009–10 | Ottawa 67's | OHL | 52 | 5 | 17 | 22 | 73 | 12 | 0 | 5 | 5 | 20 |
| 2010–11 | Houston Aeros | AHL | 31 | 1 | 3 | 4 | 15 | — | — | — | — | — |
| 2011–12 | Houston Aeros | AHL | 73 | 0 | 9 | 9 | 48 | 2 | 0 | 0 | 0 | 0 |
| 2011–12 | Minnesota Wild | NHL | 1 | 0 | 0 | 0 | 2 | — | — | — | — | — |
| 2012–13 | Houston Aeros | AHL | 42 | 1 | 11 | 12 | 14 | 1 | 0 | 0 | 0 | 0 |
| 2013–14 | Iowa Wild | AHL | 55 | 0 | 8 | 8 | 47 | — | — | — | — | — |
| 2014–15 | Graz 99ers | EBEL | 31 | 1 | 7 | 8 | 35 | — | — | — | — | — |
| 2015–16 | Vienna Capitals | EBEL | 35 | 0 | 2 | 2 | 10 | 4 | 1 | 0 | 1 | 2 |
| 2016–17 | Vienna Capitals | EBEL | 41 | 3 | 8 | 11 | 28 | 12 | 0 | 4 | 4 | 6 |
| 2017–18 | Vienna Capitals | EBEL | 48 | 1 | 13 | 14 | 36 | 11 | 0 | 1 | 1 | 18 |
| 2019–20 | HC TWK Innsbruck | EBEL | 37 | 1 | 4 | 5 | 36 | — | — | — | — | — |
| 2021–22 | Dornbirn Bulldogs | ICEHL | 37 | 0 | 7 | 7 | 24 | — | — | — | — | — |
| NHL totals | | | 1 | 0 | 0 | 0 | 2 | — | — | — | — | — |
| ICEHL totals | | | 229 | 6 | 41 | 47 | 169 | 27 | 1 | 5 | 6 | 26 |

=== International ===
| Year | Team | Event | Result | GP | G | A | Pts | PIM |
|---|---|---|---|---|---|---|---|---|
| 2007 | Canada | IH18 | 4th | 4 | 1 | 0 | 1 | 2 |
| 2008 | Canada | U18 | 1st place, gold medalist(s) | 7 | 2 | 3 | 5 | 6 |
| Junior totals | | | | 11 | 3 | 3 | 6 | 8 |

Awards and achievements
| Preceded by Colton Gillies | Minnesota Wild first-round draft pick 2008 | Succeeded by Nick Leddy |
