= James Sheppard =

Canadian ice hockey player (born 1988)

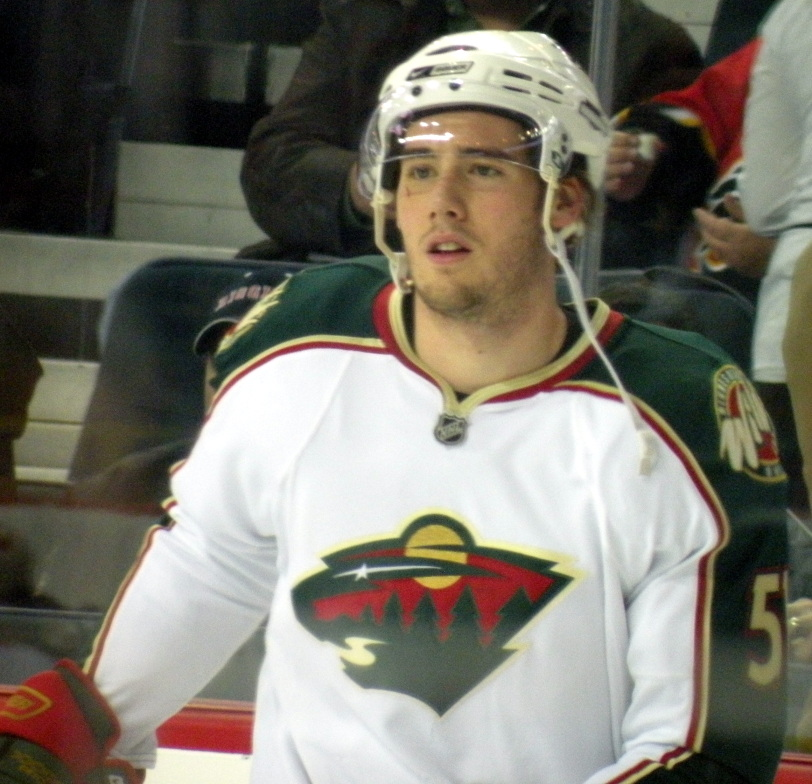
- Sheppard with the Minnesota Wild in 2009
- Born: April 25, 1988 (age 38) Lower Sackville, Nova Scotia, Canada
- Height: 6 ft 2 in (188 cm)
- Weight: 210 lb (95 kg; 15 st 0 lb)
- Position: Centre
- Shoots: Left
- ICEHL team Former teams: Vienna Capitals; Minnesota Wild; San Jose Sharks; New York Rangers; EHC Kloten; Eisbären Berlin; Kölner Haie
- NHL draft: 9th overall, 2006; Minnesota Wild
- Playing career: 2007–present

James Sheppard (born April 25, 1988) is a Canadian former professional ice hockey forward who played six seasons in the National Hockey League (NHL) for the Minnesota Wild, San Jose Sharks, and New York Rangers.

== Playing career ==
=== Junior ===
After growing up playing hockey in Hockey Nova Scotia's minor hockey system, Sheppard played for the Dartmouth Subways of the Nova Scotia Major Midget Hockey League (NSMMHL) in 2003–2004. He grew up in his elementary and junior high years attending Cavalier Drive School in Lower Sackville, Nova Scotia. In his rookie season with the Subways, Sheppard scored 92 points in 61 games. That following summer, Sheppard was drafted 1st overall in the Quebec Major Junior Hockey League (QMJHL) draft by the Cape Breton Screaming Eagles. As the season progressed, Sheppard represented Team Atlantic at the World Under-17 Championship. Sheppard wore the honour of team captain and scored ten points in six games, leading his team to a bronze medal. Sheppard eventually finished the 2004–2005 QMJHL season fourth in team scoring with 45 points. In January 2006, Sheppard was one of ten QMJHL participants to represent Team Orr in the CHL Top Prospects game, where he recorded one assist. Sheppard went on to finish the 2005–06 season second in team scoring with 84 points. Sheppard wore the honour of team captain for the 2006–07 season but was omitted from Canada's roster for the 2006 IIHF World Under-20 Hockey Championship. Sheppard was drafted by the Minnesota Wild in the first round, ninth overall, in the 2006 NHL entry draft.

=== Professional ===
Sheppard signed an entry-level contract with the Wild in September 2007 and began his professional career by making the jump straight from juniors to the NHL. He made his NHL debut on October 10, 2007, against the Edmonton Oilers, and in his first season with the Wild, he often played major minutes due to injuries to teammates. This helped him set a Wild record for games played by a rookie with 78. Though he produced only 19 points (5 goals and 14 assists) during his 78 games, he did play in all six games against the Colorado Avalanche in the first round of the 2008 Stanley Cup playoffs.

Sheppard’s second season would be slightly better than his rookie campaign, scoring 5 goals and 19 assists for 24 points. Even with the slight improvement, he would find himself in head coach Jacques Lemaire's dog house. Despite scoring only 6 points in 64 games in the 2009–10 regular season, the Wild signed Sheppard to a one-year contract extension for the 2010–11 season.

On September 7, 2010, Sheppard was involved in an ATV accident which fractured his patella. Sheppard and "several other NHL players" were on a guided tour in Vail, Colorado, when Sheppard was forced to swerve off the ATV course due to an oncoming truck and eventually hit a tree. Sheppard had knee surgery the following day, but was suspended by the team due to a "no ATV riding" clause within his contract. Because of Sheppard's non-hockey related injury, it was announced on October 6, 2010, that Sheppard will be designated as an "injured non-roster player" for the season.

Ten weeks after the accident, Sheppard appeared to the media to discuss the incident, saying he was not fooling around on the ATV and that it was on a guided tour. Sheppard was able to return to skating in mid-December, but was back off the ice again in late February due to soreness in his kneecap.

On August 6, 2011, Sheppard was traded to the San Jose Sharks in exchange for a third-round pick in the 2013 NHL entry draft. Sheppard spent much of the 2011–12 season rehabilitating from a leg injury. He returned to the NHL on January 22, 2013, for the first time in nearly three years, held pointless against the Edmonton Oilers. In 2013, Sheppard was to become a restricted free agent, but on June 26, he signed a one-year contract extension with the Sharks.

On March 1, 2015, Sheppard was traded to the New York Rangers in exchange for a fourth-round pick in the 2016 NHL entry draft.

As an unsigned free agent after his contract expired following the 2014–15 season, Sheppard attended the Columbus Blue Jackets' training camp ahead of the 2015–16 season on a professional try-out (PTO) contract, but was released by the team on September 25, 2015.

On October 9, 2015, Sheppard signed abroad with the Kloten Flyers of the Swiss National League A. At the end of the 2015–16 season, having scored a respectable 11 goals and 25 points in 37 games, Kloten opted not to offer him a contract extension, making him a free agent.

On September 13, 2016, having returned to North America, Sheppard agreed to sign a PTO contract to attend the Vancouver Canucks' training camp ahead of the 2016–17 season. On October 5, he was cut by Vancouver. On October 12, 2016, Sheppard returned to the Kloten Flyers for the 2016–17 season. On February 23, 2017, Sheppard was suspended for three games and fined 2,920 Swiss francs by the Swiss Ice Hockey Federation (SIHF) for a stick to the face of EHC Biel's Jan Neuenschwander.

On July 14, 2017, Sheppard signed a one-year contract with Eisbären Berlin of the Deutsche Eishockey Liga (DEL).

After three seasons with Berlin, on March 27, 2020, Sheppard left as a free agent and agreed to a two-year contract with Kölner Haie to remain in the DEL. Sheppard recorded 16 goals and 32 points through 36 regular season games during the 2020–21 season with Kölner Haie before leaving the club in the off-season.

On October 8, 2021, Sheppard moved to the neighbouring ICE Hockey League in agreeing to a contract with Austrian based club, Vienna Capitals.

== Personal life ==
Sheppard lived with former Minnesota Wild player Darby Hendrickson during his rookie season in 2007–08. At the time, Darby was working for FSN North.

== Career statistics ==
=== Regular season and playoffs ===
			Regular season					Playoffs
Season	Team	League	GP	G	A	Pts	PIM	GP	G	A	Pts	PIM
2003–04	Dartmouth Subways	Midget	61	38	54	92	46	—	—	—	—	—
2004–05	Cape Breton Screaming Eagles	QMJHL	65	14	31	45	40	5	1	3	4	2
2005–06	Cape Breton Screaming Eagles	QMJHL	66	30	54	84	78	9	2	5	7	12
2006–07	Cape Breton Screaming Eagles	QMJHL	56	33	63	96	62	16	8	12	20	14
2007–08	Minnesota Wild	NHL	78	4	15	19	29	6	0	1	1	4
2008–09	Minnesota Wild	NHL	82	5	19	24	41	—	—	—	—	—
2009–10	Minnesota Wild	NHL	64	2	4	6	38	—	—	—	—	—
2011–12	Worcester Sharks	AHL	4	0	0	0	2	—	—	—	—	—
2012–13	Worcester Sharks	AHL	34	8	15	23	52	—	—	—	—	—
2012–13	San Jose Sharks	NHL	32	1	3	4	12	11	0	0	0	4
2013–14	San Jose Sharks	NHL	67	4	16	20	35	7	2	4	6	6
2014–15	Worcester Sharks	AHL	2	0	1	1	0	—	—	—	—	—
2014–15	San Jose Sharks	NHL	57	5	11	16	28	—	—	—	—	—
2014–15	New York Rangers	NHL	14	2	0	2	9	13	1	1	2	8
2015–16	Kloten Flyers	NLA	37	11	14	25	67	4	1	0	1	6
2016–17	EHC Kloten	NLA	34	5	11	16	30	5	2	2	4	2
2017–18	Eisbären Berlin	DEL	52	11	22	33	50	18	6	8	14	20
2018–19	Eisbären Berlin	DEL	45	12	22	34	68	8	3	3	6	12
2019–20	Eisbären Berlin	DEL	52	13	22	35	93	—	—	—	—	—
2020–21	Kölner Haie	DEL	36	16	16	32	24	—	—	—	—	—
2021–22	Vienna Capitals	ICEHL	35	11	25	36	26	11	4	3	7	18
2022–23	Vienna Capitals	ICEHL	35	10	21	31	34	11	3	0	3	6
NHL totals			394	23	68	91	192	37	3	6	9	22
DEL totals			185	52	82	134	235	26	9	11	20	32

Medal record

Ice hockey

Representing Canada

Spengler Cup
Gold medal – first place	2015 Davos	

=== International ===
Year	Team	Event	GP	G	A	Pts	PIM
2005	Canada Atlantic	U17	6	6	4	10	6
2005	Canada	U18	5	1	3	4	18
Junior totals			11	7	7	14	24

Awards and achievements
Preceded by Benoît Pouliot	Minnesota Wild first-round draft pick 2006	Succeeded by Colton Gillies
