= Brent Burns =

Canadian ice hockey player (born 1985)

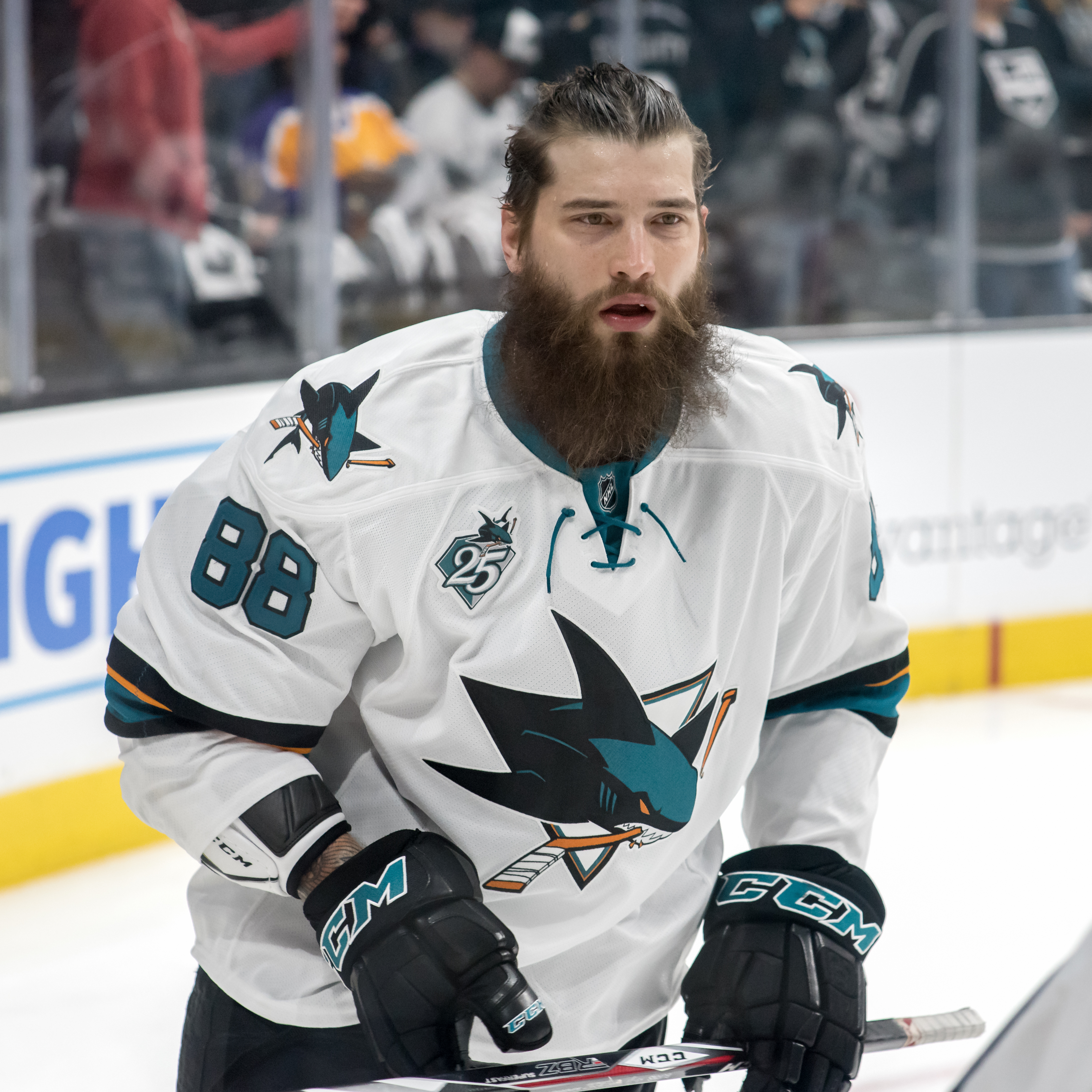
- Burns with the San Jose Sharks in April 2016
- Born: March 9, 1985 (age 41) Barrie, Ontario, Canada
- Height: 6 ft 5 in (196 cm)
- Weight: 230 lb (104 kg; 16 st 6 lb)
- Position: Defence/right wing
- Shoots: Right
- NHL team Former teams: Colorado Avalanche: Minnesota Wild; San Jose Sharks; Carolina Hurricanes
- National team: Canada
- NHL draft: 20th overall, 2003; Minnesota Wild
- Playing career: 2003–present

Brent Burns (born March 9, 1985) is a Canadian professional ice hockey player who is a defenceman for the Colorado Avalanche of the National Hockey League (NHL). Drafted as a right wing (20th overall) at the 2003 NHL entry draft by the Minnesota Wild, he was converted into a defenceman upon turning professional. Burns is known as a dynamic offensive player, and though he mostly plays defence, he has been utilized as a forward on several occasions during his career. Burns is also known for his iron man streak; during the 2025–26 season, he became the second player in NHL history to play 1,000 consecutive games.

During the shortened 2012–13 season and continuing through the 2013–14 season, the Sharks used Burns as a forward. Starting with the 2014–15 season, he was returned to defence. At the end of the 2015–16 season, Burns finished third in voting for the James Norris Memorial Trophy (awarded to the NHL's best defenceman); one year later, at the end of the 2016–17 season, Burns won the award for the first time in his career.

Following the retirement of Marc-André Fleury, Burns is the last active player in the NHL to have played in the league prior to the 2004–05 NHL lockout, having debuted in 2003–04.

== Playing career ==
=== Amateur ===
Burns was drafted by the Minnesota Wild in the first round, 20th overall, in the 2003 NHL entry draft. He spent most of his minor hockey career playing for the Barrie Icemen and Ajax Knights of the Ontario Minor Hockey Association (OMHA). He spent two years playing in the Metropolitan Toronto Hockey league (MTHL), now called the Greater Toronto Hockey League (GTHL), for the North York Canadiens, along with fellow NHL draftees Anthony Stewart and Geoff Platt. Burns then played his Ontario Hockey League (OHL) career as a right winger with the Brampton Battalion in the 2002–03 season. He led the team in playoff scoring that season with five goals and six assists in 11 games. Burns was runner-up for Most Improved Player in the OHL as voted on by Leagues coaches.

=== Professional ===
==== Minnesota Wild (2003–2011) ====
Upon turning professional with the Wild in 2003, Burns was converted to defence by defensively-minded Minnesota Head Coach Jacques Lemaire. He made his NHL debut with the Wild on October 8, 2003, against the Chicago Blackhawks, and scored his first NHL goal in his third game, against the Sharks. Burns played in 36 games with Minnesota in the 2003–04 season, showing flashes of natural ability in rushing from the blueline.

After spending the 2004–05 NHL lock-out in the American Hockey League (AHL) with the Houston Aeros, Burns adapted as a defenceman and earned a regular spot on the Wild roster for the 2005–06 season, contributing 16 points in 72 games.

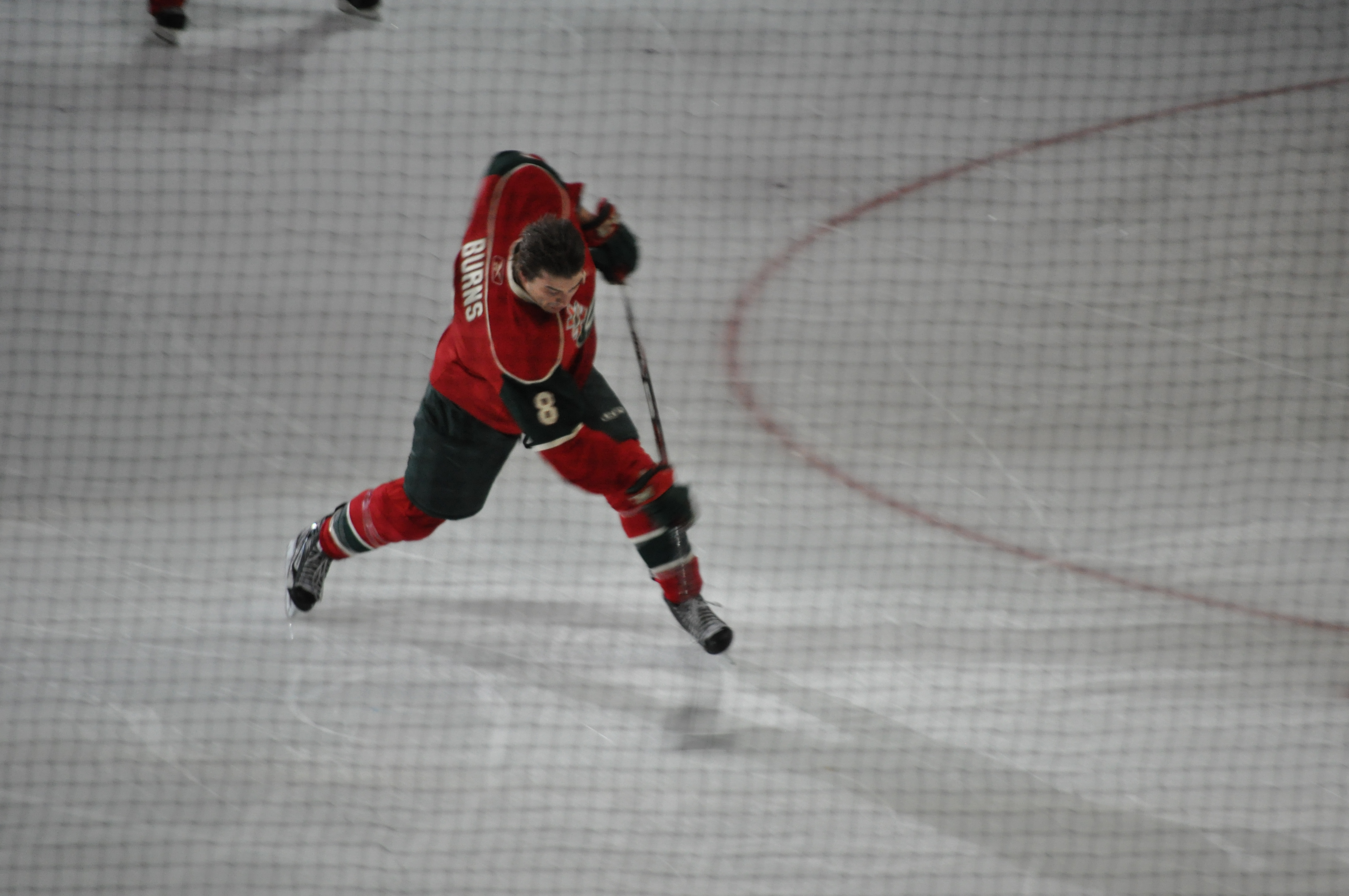
Burns with the Wild in January 2011

In the 2006–07 season, Burns eclipsed his previous season's points total with 25 and became a significant force for the Wild in the latter months of the season, scoring back-to-back overtime winners in March and engaging in two fights during the 2007 Stanley Cup playoffs.

On October 25, 2007, during the 2007–08 season, Burns signed a four-year contract extension with the Wild. He emerged as one of the Wild's top defencemen, scoring a career-high 15 goals and 43 points.

In the 2008–09 season, Burns was regularly shifted between forward and defence with mild success before he was eventually hampered by a concussion that caused him to miss the final 19 games of the regular season. Burns's concussion was later a point of scrutiny when his agent, Ron Salcer, stipulated that Wild staff had misdiagnosed his symptoms for six weeks with sinusitis, putting Burns at an increased health risk. Burns then had shoulder surgery upon the completion of the Wild season. He finished the injury-marred season with 27 points.

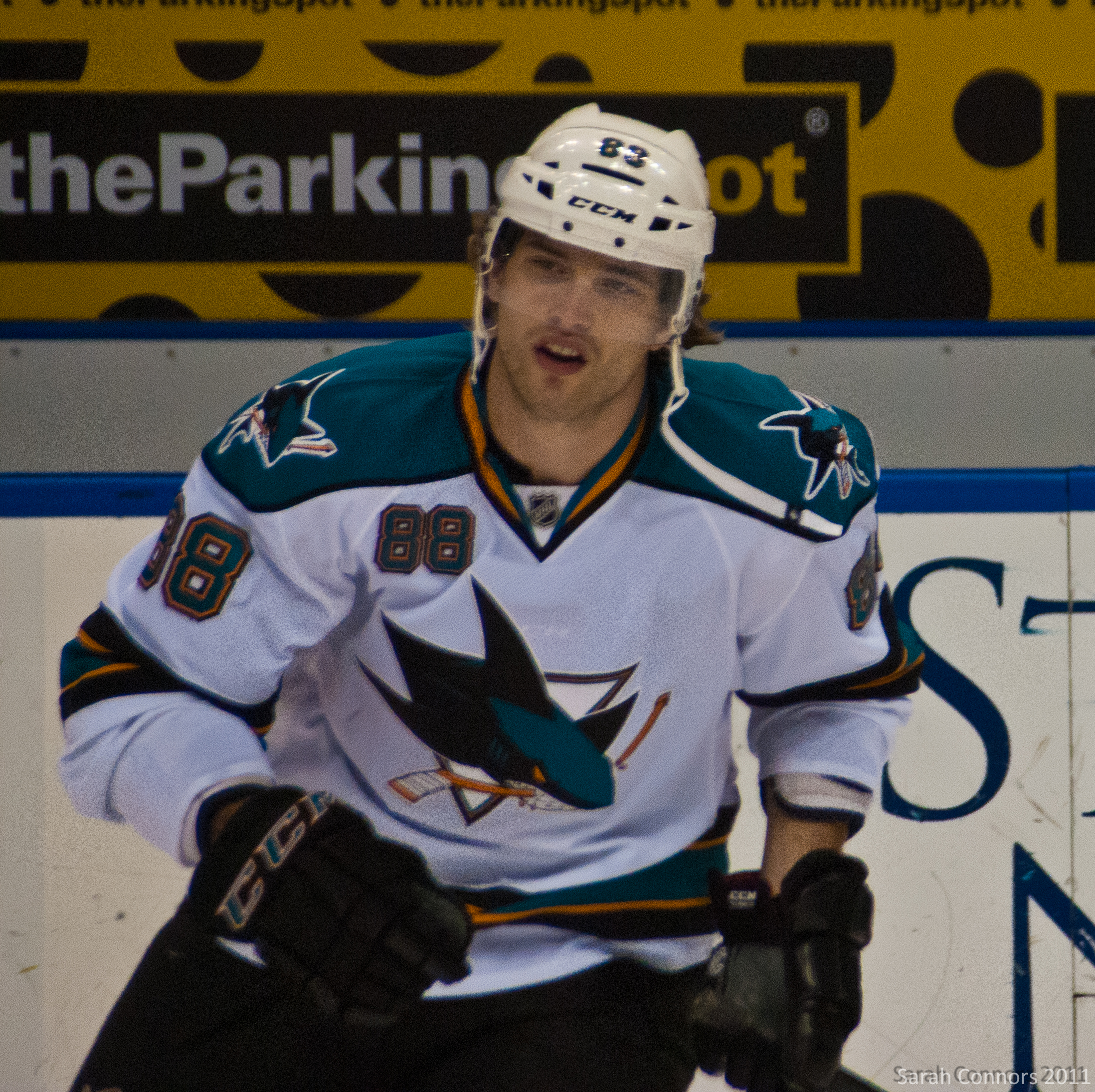
Burns with the Sharks in December 2011, during his first season with the team

Burns suffered another concussion briefly into his 2009–10 season, beginning to skate again only on January 14. He finished another injury-filled season with 20 points in 47 games. On November 12, 2010, Burns was suspended for two games for hitting Florida Panthers forward Steve Bernier. Burns hit Bernier on the chin with the knob of the stick, causing Bernier to bleed profusely.

==== San Jose Sharks (2011–2022) ====
During the 2011 NHL entry draft, Burns, along with a 2012 second-round draft pick, was traded to the San Jose Sharks in exchange for Devin Setoguchi, Charlie Coyle and a 2011 first-round pick. With a year still left in his contract with the Wild, Burns signed a five-year contract extension on August 1, 2011, with the Sharks; the deal would pay him $28.8 million over five years, with an average salary cap figure of $5.76 million.

In 2013, after rookie defenceman Matt Irwin's acquisition by the Sharks, in March, Burns was moved to forward, where he scored 20 points in 23 regular season games.

In the 2013–14 season, Burns played the first eight games of the season, but missed 13 games after October 21 due to sore gums. On November 21, Burns returned to the Sharks' line-up and scored a goal against the Tampa Bay Lightning in a 5–1 winning effort. On November 29, against the St. Louis Blues, Burns recorded his first career hat-trick in a 6–3 victory.

In August 2014, the Sharks announced that Burns would move back to defence where he scored 17 goals and finished tied for second among NHL defencemen with 60 points. Burns also won the NHL Foundation Player Award for outstanding charitable and community work.

He had a breakout season in 2015–16, finishing with 75 points (27 goals, 48 assists), then had 24 points (seven goals, 17 assists) in 24 games during the 2016 Stanley Cup playoffs to help the Sharks reach the Stanley Cup Final for the first time in franchise history.

On November 22, 2016, Burns signed an eight-year $64 million contract extension with the Sharks through 2024–25, with an average annual value of $8 million per year.

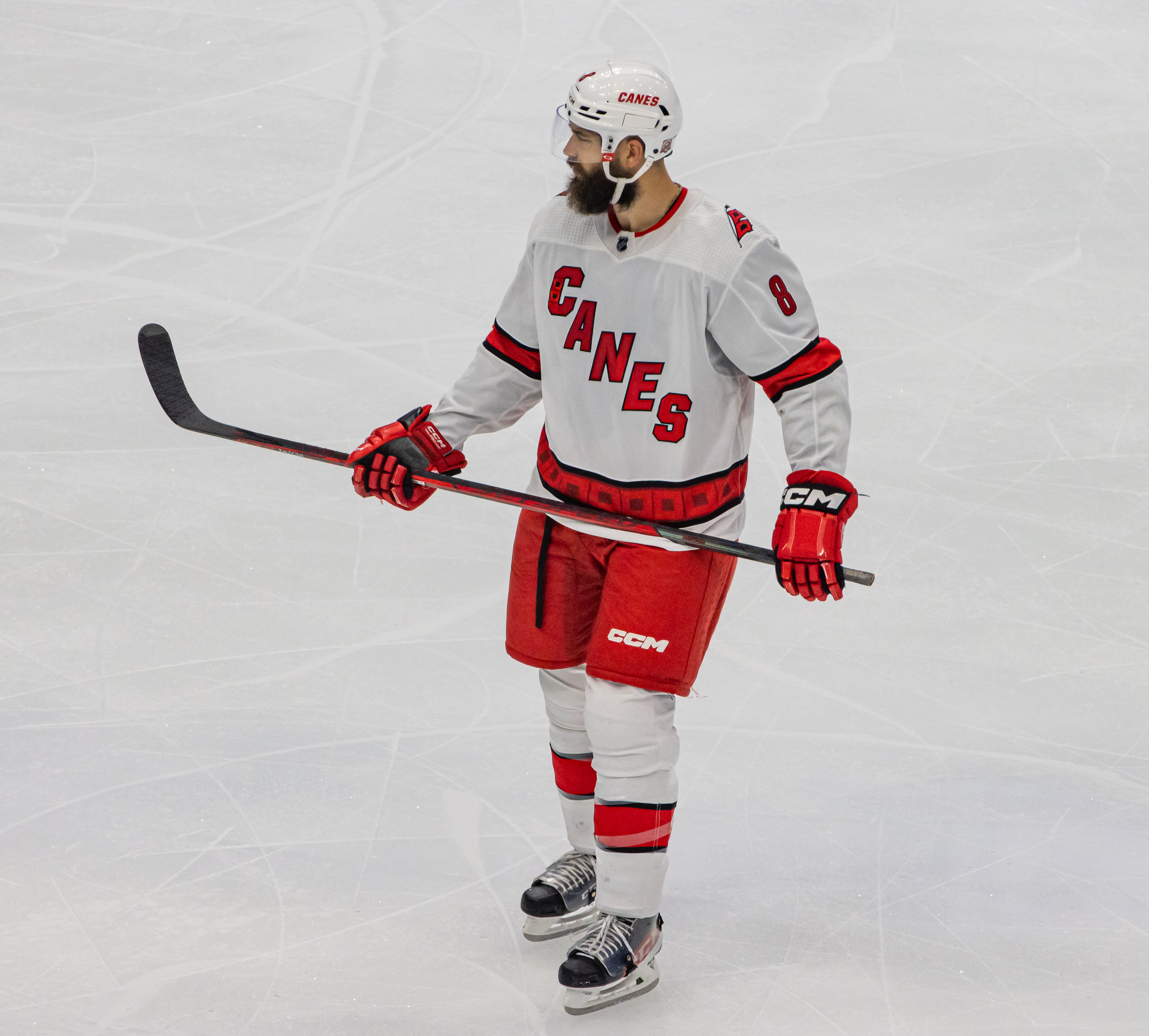
Burns with the Hurricanes in October 2022

In 2017, Burns won the James Norris Memorial Trophy as the league's best defenceman. He was also nominated for the Ted Lindsay Award, awarded annually to the league's best player as voted by the National Hockey League Players' Association.

He played in his 1,000th career game on December 27, 2018, in a 4–2 win over the Anaheim Ducks.

==== Carolina Hurricanes (2022–2025) ====
On July 13, 2022, the Sharks traded Burns and Lane Pederson to the Carolina Hurricanes in exchange for forward Steven Lorentz, goaltending prospect Eetu Mäkiniemi, and a 2023 third-round pick. On January 29, 2023, Burns played his 1,300th NHL game.

==== Colorado Avalanche (2025–present) ====
On July 3, 2025, Burns signed a one-year contract with the Colorado Avalanche. On October 11, 2025, Burns played his 1,500th NHL game, becoming the 23rd player to reach the milestone. During a January 31, 2026, game against the Detroit Red Wings, Burns scored the 270th goal of his career, tying Bobby Orr for eighth in goals by defencemen all-time. On March 14, Burns played in his 990th consecutive game in the regular season, putting him in second place all-time, after Phil Kessel. He played his 1,000th consecutive game on April 4, as the Avalanche won 2–0 against the Dallas Stars. On June 26, 2026, Burns signed a one-year extension with Colorado, returning for his 23rd NHL season.

== International play ==
Medal record

Men's ice hockey

Representing Canada

World Championships
Gold medal – first place	2015 Czech Republic	
Silver medal – second place	2008 Quebec City	

World Cup
Gold medal – first place	2016 Toronto	

World Junior Championships
Silver medal – second place	2004 Helsinki	

Burns was named the best defenceman at the 2008 World Championship as he helped Canada to a silver medal finish as the host country. Two years later, at the 2010 World Championship, Burns led all Canadian defencemen in ice time at 18:29 minutes per game as Canada finished in seventh place. He was also part of the summer camp roster for Canada in the 2010 Winter Olympics, though he did not make the final roster. At the 2015 World Championship Burns was again named the best defenceman, and a member of the all-star team, as part of Canada's gold medal-winning team.

== Personal life ==
Burns and his wife, Susan Holder, married in July 2009 and have three children.

Off the ice, Burns spends his summers in Barrie, Ontario, and Lake Elmo, Minnesota, and is a noted animal enthusiast. His suburban Saint Paul home is nicknamed "Burns Zoo" because of his collection of dogs, cats, and dozens of reptiles, mainly snakes. "Burns Zoo" was featured in a CBC Hockey Night in Canada segment with Elliotte Friedman and on After Hours.

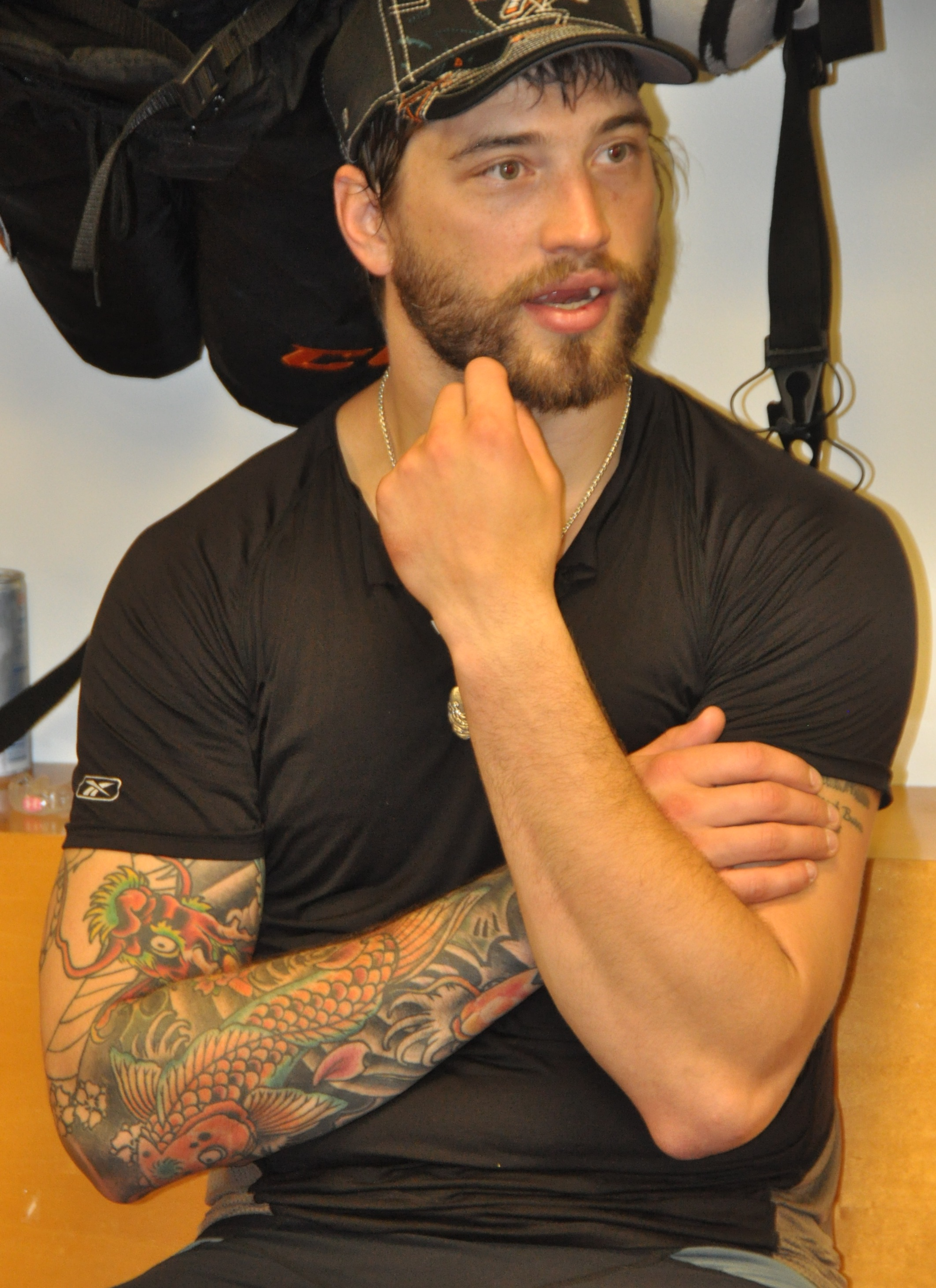
Burns in 2014

Starting with the 2009–10 season, Burns purchased a suite at the Xcel Energy Center for members of the military and their families to attend Minnesota Wild home games.

Burns also owns and operates a ranch in Texas where he raises and maintains exotic animals, including wildebeest, fallow deer, and other species. For his 1,000th game, his fellow San Jose Sharks teammates bought him two antelopes to add to his animal collection.

Burns made his acting debut in a two-episode role during season six of Vikings, portraying an ambitious raider named Skane.

== Career statistics ==
=== Regular season and playoffs ===
			Regular season					Playoffs
Season	Team	League	GP	G	A	Pts	PIM	GP	G	A	Pts	PIM
2001–02	Couchiching Terriers	OPJHL	46	4	7	11	16	—	—	—	—	—
2002–03	Brampton Battalion	OHL	68	15	25	40	14	11	5	6	11	6
2003–04	Minnesota Wild	NHL	36	1	5	6	12	—	—	—	—	—
2003–04	Houston Aeros	AHL	1	0	1	1	2	—	—	—	—	—
2004–05	Houston Aeros	AHL	73	11	16	27	57	5	0	0	0	4
2005–06	Minnesota Wild	NHL	72	4	12	16	32	—	—	—	—	—
2006–07	Minnesota Wild	NHL	77	7	18	25	26	5	0	1	1	14
2007–08	Minnesota Wild	NHL	82	15	28	43	80	6	0	2	2	6
2008–09	Minnesota Wild	NHL	59	8	19	27	45	—	—	—	—	—
2009–10	Minnesota Wild	NHL	47	3	17	20	32	—	—	—	—	—
2010–11	Minnesota Wild	NHL	80	17	29	46	98	—	—	—	—	—
2011–12	San Jose Sharks	NHL	81	11	26	37	34	5	1	1	2	4
2012–13	San Jose Sharks	NHL	30	9	11	20	20	11	2	2	4	8
2013–14	San Jose Sharks	NHL	69	22	26	48	34	7	2	1	3	23
2014–15	San Jose Sharks	NHL	82	17	43	60	65	—	—	—	—	—
2015–16	San Jose Sharks	NHL	82	27	48	75	53	24	7	17	24	12
2016–17	San Jose Sharks	NHL	82	29	47	76	40	6	0	3	3	6
2017–18	San Jose Sharks	NHL	82	12	55	67	46	10	3	4	7	6
2018–19	San Jose Sharks	NHL	82	16	67	83	34	20	5	11	16	6
2019–20	San Jose Sharks	NHL	70	12	33	45	34	—	—	—	—	—
2020–21	San Jose Sharks	NHL	56	7	22	29	36	—	—	—	—	—
2021–22	San Jose Sharks	NHL	82	10	44	54	42	—	—	—	—	—
2022–23	Carolina Hurricanes	NHL	82	18	43	61	44	15	2	7	9	20
2023–24	Carolina Hurricanes	NHL	82	10	33	43	20	11	1	3	4	2
2024–25	Carolina Hurricanes	NHL	82	6	23	29	28	15	1	4	5	10
2025–26	Colorado Avalanche	NHL	82	12	23	35	32	13	0	4	4	6
NHL totals			1,579	273	672	945	887	148	24	60	84	123

=== International ===
Year	Team	Event	Result	GP	G	A	Pts	PIM
2004	Canada	WJC	2nd place, silver medalist(s)	6	0	6	6	20
2008	Canada	WC	2nd place, silver medalist(s)	9	3	6	9	16
2010	Canada	WC	7th	7	0	5	5	12
2011	Canada	WC	5th	7	2	2	4	8
2015	Canada	WC	1st place, gold medalist(s)	10	2	9	11	2
2016	Canada	WCH	1st place, gold medalist(s)	6	0	3	3	6
Junior totals				6	0	6	6	20
Senior totals				39	7	25	32	44

== Awards and honours ==
Award	Year
NHL
NHL All-Star Game	2011, 2015, 2016, 2017, 2018, 2019
NHL Foundation Player Award	2015
Second All-Star Team	2016
First All-Star Team	2017, 2019
James Norris Memorial Trophy	2017
International
WC Best Defenceman	2008, 2015
WC All-Star team	2015

Awards and achievements
Preceded by Pierre-Marc Bouchard	Minnesota Wild first-round draft pick 2003	Succeeded by A. J. Thelen
Preceded by Drew Doughty	James Norris Memorial Trophy winner 2017	Succeeded by Victor Hedman
