= Bear and the Gang =

Bear and the Gang is an advertising campaign for the Boston Bruins created by Arnold Worldwide and the Boston Bruins as part of the Bruins Digital Entertainment Network ('Bruins DEN'). It consists of several episodes that are approximately 60 seconds each. Each episode is centered on the activities of the Bear character from the Bruins Hockey Rules commercials (not to be confused with the bear 'Blades,' who is the Bruins official mascot), and is in the form of a 1980s television sitcom.

Each Bear and the Gang episode guest-stars other popular Bruins figures besides the Bear, including players, coaches, Jack Edwards, Rene Rancourt, and 'Holly,' the captain of the Bruins Ice Girls.

== History ==
On March 26, 2012 the Boston Bruins offered users of the Bruins official mobile app exclusive access to the first episode of Bear and the Gang. That same day, the Bruins posted the introduction to the 'series' on their website.

== Cast ==
Cast members of the series include (in order of appearance in the opening credits):

- 'The Bear'
- Brad Marchand
- Jack Edwards
- Rene Rancourt
- Tyler Seguin
- Shawn Thornton
- Andrew Ference
- Tuukka Rask
- Dennis Seidenberg
- Zdeno Chara
- Adam McQuaid
- David Krejci
- Patrice Bergeron
- Johnny Boychuk
- Cam Neely
- Claude Julien as "Coach"

Also Starring

- Bruins Ice Girl Holly

== Episodes ==
No.	Title	Original release date
0	"The Bear and the Gang: Introduction"	March 26, 2012
The full length opening credits to the series
1	"Video Games"	March 29, 2012
Rene Rancourt is in the Bear's den finishing up singing the national anthem. The Bear and Brad Marchand are standing in front of the couch waiting for him to finish, and as he finishes Marchand shoots Rancourt an annoyed look. The Bear and Marchand sit down and start playing a hockey video game, with both of them using the Bruins as their team. When the camera goes back to the Bear and Marchand, Jack Edwards is in the room standing next to them giving a live play-by-play of the action in the video game. Edwards quickly gets over-excited in his usual fashion, stating "that crosses the threshold! Andrew Ference says 'you do not threaten the DNA of the hive!' The honey bees are willing to die to protect that!" After Edward's outburst Marchand looks at the Bear and says "we need some new friends." The bear nods in agreement.
2	"Date Night"	April 9, 2012
The Bear and Holly of the Bruins Ice Girls are sitting in the Bear's den watching a movie with the lights out. They begin to slide closer to each other on the couch, and lean in for a kiss. Right before they kiss Coach bursts through the door with an invisible dog leash and turns on the lights. The Bear and Holly quickly move away from each other. Coach tells them how amused he is by his joke dog leash, and the Bear and Holly just give him blank stares. Coach then asks if he's interrupting anything, to which Holly replies "Coach has a dog?"
