= 2011 Stanley Cup Final =

2011 ice hockey championship series

| | 1 | 2 | 3 | 4 | 5 | 6 | 7 | Total |
|---|---|---|---|---|---|---|---|---|
| Boston Bruins | 0 | 2* | 8 | 4 | 0 | 5 | 4 | 4 |
| Vancouver Canucks | 1 | 3* | 1 | 0 | 1 | 2 | 0 | 3 |
- * – Denotes overtime period(s)
- Location(s): Boston: TD Garden (3, 4, 6); Vancouver: Rogers Arena (1, 2, 5, 7)
- Coaches: Boston: Claude Julien; Vancouver: Alain Vigneault
- Captains: Boston: Zdeno Chara; Vancouver: Henrik Sedin
- National anthems: Boston: Rene Rancourt; Vancouver: Mark Donnelly (Canadian); Richard Loney (American)
- Referees: Dan O'Halloran (2, 4, 6, 7); Dan O'Rourke (1, 3, 5); Kelly Sutherland (2, 4, 6); Stephen Walkom (1, 3, 5, 7)
- Dates: June 1–15, 2011
- MVP: Tim Thomas (Bruins)
- Series-winning goal: Patrice Bergeron (14:37, first)
- Hall of Famers: Bruins: Patrice Bergeron (2026); Zdeno Chara (2025); Mark Recchi (2017); Canucks: Roberto Luongo (2022); Daniel Sedin (2022); Henrik Sedin (2022)
- Networks: Canada: (English): CBC (French): RDS; United States: (English): NBC (1–2, 5–7), Versus (3, 4)
- Announcers: (CBC) Jim Hughson, Craig Simpson, and Glenn Healy (RDS) Pierre Houde and Benoit Brunet (NBC/Versus) Mike Emrick, Eddie Olczyk, and Pierre McGuire (NHL International) Dave Strader and Joe Micheletti

The 2011 Stanley Cup Final was the championship series of the National Hockey League's (NHL) 2010–11 season, and the culmination of the 2011 Stanley Cup playoffs. The Eastern Conference champion Boston Bruins defeated the Western Conference champion Vancouver Canucks in seven games to win the Stanley Cup for the first time since 1972. Bruins goaltender Tim Thomas was awarded the Conn Smythe Trophy as the most valuable player of the playoffs.

The Canucks had home ice advantage in the Final by winning the Presidents' Trophy as the team that finished with the best regular season record (117 points). They were also the first Canadian team to have home ice advantage in the Final since the Montreal Canadiens had it in 1993. The Canucks were also the last Canadian team to reach the Finals until 2021. It was the furthest distance between two cities in NHL history for the Finals, at 4,023 kilometres (2,500 miles), until 2024 and 2025 as both were between the Florida Panthers and Edmonton Oilers.

The series began on June 1 and ended on June 15. The games varied widely between those played in Vancouver and those in Boston. Prior to game seven, the Bruins scored two goals in three games played in Vancouver (games one, two, and five), against 17 scored in three games at Boston (games three, four, and six). On the other hand, while he posted two 1–0 shutouts in Vancouver (games one and five), Canucks goaltender Roberto Luongo was replaced with the backup Cory Schneider twice in three games (games four and six) in Boston. The Bruins scored almost three times the number of total goals as the Canucks, (23–8 in the series), and scored as many goals in a single game (game three) as the Canucks did during the entire series, but the Canucks still won three games (games one, two, and five, respectively). The eight goals scored by Vancouver is the lowest number of goals scored by any team in a full seven-game series in NHL history. It was the fourth consecutive Stanley Cup Final in which the road team won the Stanley Cup.

The Final marked the first time that two francophone Canadian head coaches, Claude Julien of Boston and Alain Vigneault of Vancouver had coached the opposing finalists. Both coaches also had nearly identical backgrounds. Both had grown up near Ottawa, both had played together with the Salt Lake Golden Eagles, both had coached the Hull Olympiques and Montreal Canadiens and both had won Coach of the Year honours. The two were friends, but that changed for the Final. According to Julien, "To be able to get through all that and meet in the final is great. But right now, that's where it ends."

== Paths to the Finals ==
=== Boston Bruins ===
The Bruins finished the regular season as the Northeast Division champion with 103 points, earning the third seed in the Eastern Conference. In their 33rd postseason meeting, Boston eliminated their bitter rivals, the sixth-seeded Montreal Canadiens, in the first round of the playoffs in seven games. The Bruins went on to sweep the second-seeded Philadelphia Flyers in the second round, outscoring the Flyers 20–7 in the four games. Later, in the Eastern Conference Finals, Boston defeated the fifth-seeded Tampa Bay Lightning in seven games.

This was the eighteenth appearance in the Stanley Cup Final for the Bruins, and their first since 1990, which they lost in five games to the Edmonton Oilers. It also allowed Boston to join New York City and Philadelphia as being the only cities to have all their teams play in each of the four major North American professional sports leagues' title rounds since 2000, following the Patriots in Super Bowls XXXVI in 2002, XXXVIII in 2004, XXXIX in 2005, and XLII in 2008. The Red Sox winning World Series titles in 2004, 2007, and the Celtics in the NBA Finals in 2008 and 2010 and winning in 2008.

The Bruins won their sixth Cup championship, and their first one since defeating the New York Rangers in 1972 in six games, which made Boston the first city to have championships in each of the four leagues in the new millennium.

=== Vancouver Canucks ===
The Canucks, in their 41st season, finished the regular season with the best record at 117 points, winning their first Presidents' Trophy in team history. In the first round of the playoffs, the Canucks met the Chicago Blackhawks for the third consecutive postseason, losing both previous series in six games in the second round. After Vancouver won the first three games, the eighth-seeded and defending Stanley Cup champion Blackhawks won the next three to force a seventh game. Vancouver won the seventh game in overtime on a goal by Alex Burrows to avoid becoming the fourth team in NHL history to lose a series after taking a 3–0 series lead. The Canucks then eliminated the fifth-seeded Nashville Predators in six games during the conference semifinals, with each game in that series decided by just a single goal (with the exception of an empty net goal scored by Vancouver in Game 4). Vancouver then went on to defeat the second-seeded San Jose Sharks in the Western Conference Finals in five games, winning the fifth game in overtime with Kevin Bieksa winning it for the Canucks.

This was Vancouver's third appearance in the Stanley Cup Final. They appeared in the Finals against New York-based teams with the Islanders in 1982 and the Rangers in 1994 losing both series in four and seven games, respectively. The most recent Canada-based NHL team to win the Stanley Cup was the Montreal Canadiens in 1993. The Canucks were the first team from Canada to make it to the Finals since the Ottawa Senators in 2007.

With Vancouver hosting the 2010 Winter Olympics, the Canucks hoped to mirror the other two Olympic Games held in Canada in which the host city's NHL team won the Stanley Cup the subsequent year. Montreal hosted the 1976 Summer Olympics and the following year, the Canadiens won the Stanley Cup. The Calgary Flames won the Stanley Cup in 1989, the previous year Calgary hosted the 1988 Winter Olympics.

With the loss, Vancouver became the third team to lose in the Finals after winning the Presidents' Trophy, after the Bruins in 1990 and the Detroit Red Wings in 1995.

== Triple Gold Club ==
Center Patrice Bergeron became the twenty-fifth player to enter the "Triple Gold Club", consisting of individuals who have won the Stanley Cup along with gold medals at the Winter Olympics, and World Championships, as a result of the Bruins winning the series. Bergeron also won gold medals as a teammate of Vancouver Canucks' goaltender Roberto Luongo at the 2004 Worlds and 2010 Olympics with Team Canada. Luongo – who also won the 2003 Worlds – would have become the first goaltender ever to enter the "Triple Gold Club", had the Canucks won. Both Luongo and Bergeron later got a second Olympic gold in the 2014 Winter Olympics.

== Game summaries ==
Number in parentheses represents the player's total in goals or assists to that point of the entire four rounds of the playoffs

=== Game one ===
| June 1 | Boston Bruins | 0–1 | Vancouver Canucks | Rogers Arena | Recap |

Raffi Torres's goal with 18.5 seconds left in regulation broke a scoreless tie to give the Canucks the victory. The entire game was seen as a duel between the two opposing goaltenders; both Vancouver's Roberto Luongo and Boston's Tim Thomas were Vezina Trophy finalists for the 2010–11 season. Thomas stopped 33 of 34 shots while Luongo made 36 saves for his third shutout of the 2011 playoffs. Both of Luongo's two previous shutouts of the 2011 playoffs had also occurred in a game one (a 2–0 victory against Chicago in the first round, and a 1–0 victory against Nashville in the second round). This was the first time since 1984 that the opening game of the Cup Finals was scoreless through two periods.

Both teams killed off all penalties in the game, including a five-on-three power play Boston had in the second period, and a double minor high-sticking penalty called on Vancouver's Daniel Sedin in the first. At the end of the first period, Vancouver's Alex Burrows was called for a double minor roughing penalty on Boston's Patrice Bergeron, while Bergeron also got a roughing minor. Replays showed that Burrows could have bit Bergeron's finger, but the evidence was inconclusive. Despite Bergeron's pleading to the referees, no additional penalty was assessed to Burrows. However, despite biting being a suspendible offense, Burrows did not receive a suspension from the NHL on the grounds that no conclusive evidence that Burrows actually bit Bergeron could be found.

Scoring summary
| Period | Team | Goal | Assist(s) | Time | Score |
|---|---|---|---|---|---|
| 1st | None | | | | |
| 2nd | None | | | | |
| 3rd | VAN | Raffi Torres (3) | Jannik Hansen (5) and Ryan Kesler (12) | 19:41 | 1–0 VAN |
Penalty summary
| Period | Team | Player | Penalty | Time | PIM |
| 1st | VAN | Daniel Sedin | High-sticking – double minor | 04:03 | 4:00 |
| 1st | BOS | Chris Kelly | High-sticking | 08:47 | 2:00 |
| 1st | VAN | Alex Burrows | Holding | 10:18 | 2:00 |
| 1st | BOS | Brad Marchand | Holding the stick | 13:25 | 2:00 |
| 1st | BOS | Patrice Bergeron | Roughing | 20:00 | 2:00 |
| 1st | VAN | Alex Burrows (served by Raffi Torres) | Roughing | 20:00 | 2:00 |
| 1st | VAN | Alex Burrows | Roughing | 20:00 | 2:00 |
| 2nd | VAN | Kevin Bieksa | High-sticking | 00:28 | 2:00 |
| 2nd | BOS | David Krejci | Cross-checking | 04:00 | 2:00 |
| 2nd | BOS | Dennis Seidenberg | Kneeing | 09:28 | 2:00 |
| 2nd | BOS | Rich Peverley | Hooking | 09:54 | 2:00 |
| 2nd | VAN | Alex Burrows | Tripping | 10:02 | 2:00 |
| 2nd | BOS | Patrice Bergeron | Tripping | 17:50 | 2:00 |
| 3rd | None | | | | |

Shots by period
| Team | 1 | 2 | 3 | Total |
|---|---|---|---|---|
| BOS | 17 | 9 | 10 | 36 |
| VAN | 12 | 8 | 14 | 34 |

=== Game two ===
| June 4 | Boston Bruins | 2–3 | OT | Vancouver Canucks | Rogers Arena | Recap |

In the second-fastest overtime in Stanley Cup Final history, Alex Burrows scored 11 seconds into the first overtime to give Vancouver a 3–2 win. Burrows faked a shot, causing Boston goalie Tim Thomas to move out of position, then skated around the net to put the puck into the empty net for the game-winning goal; Thomas was not able to recover his position. This was Burrows's second goal of the game. He opened the scoring with a goal in the first period during the final seconds of a power play. Boston responded with two goals in the second period, one by Milan Lucic and a power play goal by Mark Recchi. However, Daniel Sedin tied the score at 2–2 about midway through the third period.

The game featured the return of Vancouver forward Manny Malhotra, who had not played a game since March 16, when he suffered a severe eye injury after taking a puck to the face from a deflection by Colorado Avalanche defenseman Erik Johnson. Both Thomas and Roberto Luongo stopped 30 of 33 shots and 28 of 30 shots, respectively. With his second period goal, 43-year-old Recchi became the oldest player to score in the Cup Finals.

Before the game, the Boston Red Sox baseball club moved their game against the Oakland Athletics at Fenway Park from 7:10 p.m. EDT to 1:10 p.m. EDT to allow for Bruins fans to watch the game.

Scoring summary
| Period | Team | Goal | Assist(s) | Time | Score |
|---|---|---|---|---|---|
| 1st | VAN | Alex Burrows (8) – pp | Chris Higgins (4) and Sami Salo (2) | 12:12 | 1–0 VAN |
| 2nd | BOS | Milan Lucic (4) | Johnny Boychuk (4) and David Krejci (8) | 09:00 | 1–1 |
| 2nd | BOS | Mark Recchi (3) – pp | Zdeno Chara (4) and Patrice Bergeron (12) | 11:35 | 2–1 BOS |
| 3rd | VAN | Daniel Sedin (9) | Alex Burrows (8) and Alexander Edler (8) | 09:37 | 2–2 |
| OT | VAN | Alex Burrows (9) | Daniel Sedin (9) and Alexander Edler (9) | 00:11 | 3–2 VAN |
Penalty summary
| Period | Team | Player | Penalty | Time | PIM |
| 1st | BOS | Zdeno Chara | Interference | 10:24 | 2:00 |
| 2nd | VAN | Kevin Bieksa | Delay of game (puck over glass) | 01:03 | 2:00 |
| 2nd | VAN | Aaron Rome | Holding | 10:26 | 2:00 |
| 2nd | VAN | Aaron Rome | Interference | 18:59 | 2:00 |
| 3rd | BOS | Dennis Seidenberg | Tripping | 00:52 | 2:00 |
| OT | None | | | | |

Shots by period
| Team | 1 | 2 | 3 | OT | Total |
|---|---|---|---|---|---|
| BOS | 11 | 14 | 5 | 0 | 30 |
| VAN | 11 | 10 | 11 | 1 | 33 |

=== Game three ===
| June 6 | Vancouver Canucks | 1–8 | Boston Bruins | TD Garden | Recap |

Boston scored four goals in the second period, and another four goals in the third, which resulted in an 8–1 rout. Mark Recchi scored two of them; Brad Marchand and Daniel Paille each scored shorthanded; and Andrew Ference, David Krejci, Chris Kelly and Michael Ryder each tallied one of the other four. Tim Thomas stopped 40 out of 41 shots, only allowing a third period goal by Jannik Hansen.

At 05:07 into the first period, Vancouver defenseman Aaron Rome received a major penalty for interference and a game misconduct for a blindside hit to the head of Boston forward Nathan Horton. Horton was taken off the ice on a stretcher and was then transported to a hospital for further observation and was later diagnosed with a severe concussion, and he would not return for the remainder of the series. The Bruins did not score on the ensuing five-minute power play. Following a disciplinary hearing on June 7, Rome was given a four-game suspension for the late hit which assured that he'd miss the remainder of the 2011 playoffs, the first multi-game suspension in the history of the Stanley Cup Final. Rome and the Canucks maintained that the play was a good hit that went bad, but the NHL determined that the hit came more than a second after Horton gave up the puck. The NHL considers a hit to be late if it comes more than half a second after a player gives up possession.

In contrast to game two, which featured only 10 minutes of penalties for the entire game, game three had 145 total penalty minutes, the most in a Cup Final game since game two of the 1990 Finals. The 8–1 score was the biggest goal differential in the Stanley Cup Final since 1996, when the Colorado Avalanche defeated the Florida Panthers in game two by the same score.

Scoring summary
| Period | Team | Goal | Assist(s) | Time | Score |
|---|---|---|---|---|---|
| 1st | None | | | | |
| 2nd | BOS | Andrew Ference (3) | Rich Peverley (7) and David Krejci (9) | 00:11 | 1–0 BOS |
| 2nd | BOS | Mark Recchi (4) – pp | Michael Ryder (7) and Andrew Ference (6) | 04:22 | 2–0 BOS |
| 2nd | BOS | Brad Marchand (7) – sh | Unassisted | 11:30 | 3–0 BOS |
| 2nd | BOS | David Krejci (11) | Michael Ryder (8) and Zdeno Chara (5) | 15:47 | 4–0 BOS |
| 3rd | BOS | Daniel Paille (3) – sh | Johnny Boychuk (5) | 11:38 | 5–0 BOS |
| 3rd | VAN | Jannik Hansen (3) | Raffi Torres (3) and Maxim Lapierre (2) | 13:53 | 5–1 BOS |
| 3rd | BOS | Mark Recchi (5) | Brad Marchand (7) and Patrice Bergeron (13) | 17:39 | 6–1 BOS |
| 3rd | BOS | Chris Kelly (5) | Daniel Paille (3) and Zdeno Chara (6) | 18:06 | 7–1 BOS |
| 3rd | BOS | Michael Ryder (6) – pp | Tomas Kaberle (9) | 19:29 | 8–1 BOS |
Penalty summary
| Period | Team | Player | Penalty | Time | PIM |
| 1st | VAN | Aaron Rome (served by Raffi Torres) | Interference – major | 05:07 | 5:00 |
| 1st | VAN | Aaron Rome | Game misconduct | 05:07 | 10:00 |
| 1st | BOS | Adam McQuaid | Delay of game (puck over glass) | 11:41 | 2:00 |
| 2nd | VAN | Jeff Tambellini | Hooking | 02:42 | 2:00 |
| 2nd | BOS | Andrew Ference | Tripping | 06:22 | 2:00 |
| 2nd | BOS | Milan Lucic | Slashing | 10:30 | 2:00 |
| 2nd | BOS | Johnny Boychuk | High-sticking – double minor | 17:36 | 4:00 |
| 3rd | BOS | Michael Ryder | Roughing | 02:50 | 2:00 |
| 3rd | BOS | Zdeno Chara | Unsportsmanlike conduct | 03:33 | 2:00 |
| 3rd | VAN | Alex Burrows | Unsportsmanlike conduct | 03:33 | 2:00 |
| 3rd | BOS | Andrew Ference | Misconduct | 06:59 | 10:00 |
| 3rd | VAN | Daniel Sedin | Misconduct | 06:59 | 10:00 |
| 3rd | BOS | Shawn Thornton (served by Michael Ryder) | Roughing | 07:58 | 2:00 |
| 3rd | BOS | Shawn Thornton | Misconduct | 07:58 | 10:00 |
| 3rd | VAN | Ryan Kesler | Boarding | 09:11 | 2:00 |
| 3rd | VAN | Alex Burrows | Slashing | 11:16 | 2:00 |
| 3rd | VAN | Alex Burrows | Misconduct | 11:16 | 10:00 |
| 3rd | VAN | Ryan Kesler | Fighting – major | 11:16 | 5:00 |
| 3rd | VAN | Ryan Kesler | Misconduct | 11:16 | 10:00 |
| 3rd | BOS | Milan Lucic (served by Michael Ryder) | Slashing | 11:16 | 2:00 |
| 3rd | BOS | Milan Lucic | Roughing | 11:16 | 2:00 |
| 3rd | BOS | Milan Lucic | Misconduct | 11:16 | 10:00 |
| 3rd | BOS | Dennis Seidenberg | Fighting – major | 11:16 | 5:00 |
| 3rd | BOS | Dennis Seidenberg | Misconduct | 11:16 | 10:00 |
| 3rd | BOS | Andrew Ference | Misconduct | 17:51 | 10:00 |
| 3rd | VAN | Kevin Bieksa | Misconduct | 17:51 | 10:00 |
| 3rd | VAN | Raffi Torres | Charging | 18:53 | 2:00 |

Shots by period
| Team | 1 | 2 | 3 | Total |
|---|---|---|---|---|
| VAN | 12 | 16 | 13 | 41 |
| BOS | 7 | 14 | 17 | 38 |

=== Game four ===
| June 8 | Vancouver Canucks | 0–4 | Boston Bruins | TD Garden | Recap |

Tim Thomas made 38 saves and Rich Peverley scored two goals as Boston shut out Vancouver, 4–0, to even the series. Roberto Luongo, who stopped only 16 out of 20 shots, was replaced by backup goalie Cory Schneider after giving up the fourth Boston goal at 03:39 of the third period.

Scoring summary
| Period | Team | Goal | Assist(s) | Time | Score |
|---|---|---|---|---|---|
| 1st | BOS | Rich Peverley (3) | David Krejci (10) and Zdeno Chara (7) | 11:59 | 1–0 BOS |
| 2nd | BOS | Michael Ryder (7) | Tyler Seguin (4) and Chris Kelly (8) | 11:11 | 2–0 BOS |
| 2nd | BOS | Brad Marchand (8) | Patrice Bergeron (14) | 13:29 | 3–0 BOS |
| 3rd | BOS | Rich Peverley (4) | Milan Lucic (7) and David Krejci (11) | 03:39 | 4–0 BOS |
Penalty summary
| Period | Team | Player | Penalty | Time | PIM |
| 1st | BOS | Michael Ryder | Tripping | 06:58 | 2:00 |
| 1st | BOS | Brad Marchand | Cross-checking | 16:10 | 2:00 |
| 2nd | VAN | Mason Raymond | High-sticking | 07:41 | 2:00 |
| 2nd | VAN | Andrew Alberts | Slashing | 12:05 | 2:00 |
| 2nd | BOS | Rich Peverley | Cross-checking | 12:05 | 2:00 |
| 2nd | BOS | Johnny Boychuk | Delay of game (puck over glass) | 18:49 | 2:00 |
| 3rd | VAN | Daniel Sedin | Slashing | 00:52 | 2:00 |
| 3rd | BOS | Mark Recchi | High-sticking | 9:14 | 2:00 |
| 3rd | VAN | Ryan Kesler | Slashing | 10:25 | 2:00 |
| 3rd | VAN | Maxim Lapierre | Slashing | 14:35 | 2:00 |
| 3rd | BOS | Brad Marchand (served by Tyler Seguin) | Roughing | 17:33 | 2:00 |
| 3rd | VAN | Keith Ballard | Roughing | 17:33 | 2:00 |
| 3rd | BOS | Brad Marchand | Holding | 17:33 | 2:00 |
| 3rd | BOS | Brad Marchand | Tripping | 17:33 | 2:00 |
| 3rd | BOS | Adam McQuaid | Misconduct | 17:33 | 10:00 |
| 3rd | VAN | Alex Burrows | Cross-checking | 18:09 | 2:00 |
| 3rd | VAN | Ryan Kesler | Roughing | 18:09 | 2:00 |
| 3rd | VAN | Ryan Kesler | Misconduct | 18:09 | 10:00 |
| 3rd | BOS | Zdeno Chara | Roughing | 18:09 | 2:00 |
| 3rd | BOS | Zdeno Chara | Misconduct | 18:09 | 10:00 |
| 3rd | BOS | Tim Thomas (served by Shawn Thornton) | Slashing | 18:09 | 2:00 |

Shots by period
| Team | 1 | 2 | 3 | Total |
|---|---|---|---|---|
| VAN | 12 | 13 | 13 | 38 |
| BOS | 6 | 12 | 11 | 29 |

=== Game five ===
| June 10 | Boston Bruins | 0–1 | Vancouver Canucks | Rogers Arena | Recap |

Roberto Luongo made 31 saves and Maxim Lapierre scored the game's only goal to give Vancouver a 3–2 series lead. This was the second 1–0 victory for Vancouver in the Finals; game one ended with the same score. Lapierre's goal came at 04:35 into the third period. Kevin Bieksa's shot went wide and rebounded off the end boards to Lapierre on the other side of the net, who then beat Tim Thomas after the Boston goalie was unable to recover his position in time. Thomas made 24 saves in the loss.

Luongo joined Frank McCool as the only goalie to have two 1–0 shutouts in the Stanley Cup Final; McCool's victories came 66 years earlier in 1945.

Scoring summary
| Period | Team | Goal | Assist(s) | Time | Score |
|---|---|---|---|---|---|
| 1st | None | | | | |
| 2nd | None | | | | |
| 3rd | VAN | Maxim Lapierre (2) | Kevin Bieksa (5) and Raffi Torres (4) | 04:35 | 1–0 VAN |
Penalty summary
| Period | Team | Player | Penalty | Time | PIM |
| 1st | VAN | Raffi Torres | Tripping | 01:39 | 2:00 |
| 1st | VAN | Henrik Sedin | Interference | 06:54 | 2:00 |
| 1st | VAN | Andrew Alberts | Roughing | 14:13 | 2:00 |
| 1st | BOS | Milan Lucic | Tripping | 19:27 | 2:00 |
| 1st | VAN | Alex Burrows | Unsportsmanlike conduct | 19:27 | 2:00 |
| 2nd | VAN | Ryan Kesler | Goaltender interference | 04:18 | 2:00 |
| 2nd | BOS | Adam McQuaid | Holding | 07:22 | 2:00 |
| 2nd | BOS | Patrice Bergeron | Holding | 15:56 | 2:00 |
| 3rd | BOS | Rich Peverley | Tripping | 12:09 | 2:00 |

Shots by period
| Team | 1 | 2 | 3 | Total |
|---|---|---|---|---|
| BOS | 12 | 9 | 10 | 31 |
| VAN | 6 | 12 | 7 | 25 |

=== Game six ===
| June 13 | Vancouver Canucks | 2–5 | Boston Bruins | TD Garden | Recap |

Boston defeated Vancouver 5–2 in TD Garden to prevent the Canucks from clinching their first Stanley Cup in franchise history and force a deciding seventh game, the 16th Game seven in Finals history. The Bruins scored four goals in a span of 4:14 in the first period, breaking the record for the quickest four goals tallied by one team in the Cup Finals. For the second time in the series, Roberto Luongo was replaced by backup goalie Cory Schneider; this came after Luongo gave up Boston's third goal at 08:35.

Vancouver forward Mason Raymond suffered a fractured vertebra 20 seconds into the game on an awkward hit into the boards by Boston defenseman Johnny Boychuk, and had to be taken to a hospital for treatment.

Scoring summary
| Period | Team | Goal | Assist(s) | Time | Score |
|---|---|---|---|---|---|
| 1st | BOS | Brad Marchand (9) | Mark Recchi (6) and Dennis Seidenberg (8) | 05:31 | 1–0 BOS |
| 1st | BOS | Milan Lucic (5) | Rich Peverley (8) and Johnny Boychuk (6) | 06:06 | 2–0 BOS |
| 1st | BOS | Andrew Ference (4) – pp | Michael Ryder (9) and Mark Recchi (7) | 08:35 | 3–0 BOS |
| 1st | BOS | Michael Ryder (8) | Tomas Kaberle (10) | 09:45 | 4–0 BOS |
| 2nd | None | | | | |
| 3rd | VAN | Henrik Sedin (3) – pp | Daniel Sedin (10) and Christian Ehrhoff (10) | 00:22 | 4–1 BOS |
| 3rd | BOS | David Krejci (12) – pp | Mark Recchi (8) and Tomas Kaberle (11) | 06:59 | 5–1 BOS |
| 3rd | VAN | Maxim Lapierre (3) | Daniel Sedin (11) and Jannik Hansen (4) | 17:34 | 5–2 BOS |
Penalty summary
| Period | Team | Player | Penalty | Time | PIM |
| 1st | VAN | Henrik Sedin | Unsportsmanlike conduct | 00:56 | 2:00 |
| 1st | BOS | Zdeno Chara | Interference | 00:56 | 2:00 |
| 1st | VAN | Alexander Edler | Boarding | 07:55 | 2:00 |
| 1st | VAN | Ryan Kesler | Holding | 10:31 | 2:00 |
| 1st | VAN | Bench (served by Raffi Torres) | Too many men on the ice | 17:09 | 2:00 |
| 2nd | BOS | Patrice Bergeron | Goaltender interference | 00:28 | 2:00 |
| 2nd | BOS | Patrice Bergeron | Interference | 12:15 | 2:00 |
| 2nd | BOS | Patrice Bergeron | Elbowing | 19:08 | 2:00 |
| 3rd | VAN | Raffi Torres | Tripping | 05:23 | 2:00 |
| 3rd | VAN | Andrew Alberts | Cross-checking | 06:11 | 2:00 |
| 3rd | VAN | Alex Burrows | Slashing | 06:59 | 2:00 |
| 3rd | BOS | Patrice Bergeron | Cross-checking | 06:59 | 2:00 |
| 3rd | BOS | Mark Recchi | Tripping | 11:32 | 2:00 |
| 3rd | BOS | Brad Marchand (served by David Krejci) | Roughing | 18:29 | 2:00 |
| 3rd | BOS | Brad Marchand | Misconduct | 18:29 | 10:00 |
| 3rd | BOS | Shawn Thornton | Misconduct | 18:29 | 10:00 |
| 3rd | VAN | Daniel Sedin | Misconduct | 18:29 | 10:00 |
| 3rd | VAN | Maxim Lapierre | Misconduct | 18:29 | 10:00 |
| 3rd | BOS | Dennis Seidenberg | Cross-checking | 19:03 | 2:00 |

Shots by period
| Team | 1 | 2 | 3 | Total |
|---|---|---|---|---|
| VAN | 11 | 11 | 16 | 38 |
| BOS | 19 | 8 | 13 | 40 |

=== Game seven ===
| June 15 | Boston Bruins | 4–0 | Vancouver Canucks | Rogers Arena | Recap |

External videos
- Game 7 Full replay (NHL International's feed) on the NHL's official YouTube channel

In Boston's first-ever Stanley Cup Final game seven, Tim Thomas made 37 saves as Boston shut out Vancouver, 4–0, to win the Stanley Cup. Patrice Bergeron and Brad Marchand each scored two goals for Boston. Bergeron scored first at 14:37 in the first period, then had a shorthanded goal at 17:35 in the second. Marchand's first goal came at 12:13 of the second period; he then scored on an empty net late in the third. Roberto Luongo stopped 17 out of 20 shots in the loss. The game was the last of Mark Recchi's 22-year NHL career; he announced his retirement immediately afterward, during the post-game celebration.

Scoring summary
| Period | Team | Goal | Assist(s) | Time | Score |
|---|---|---|---|---|---|
| 1st | BOS | Patrice Bergeron (5) | Brad Marchand (8) | 14:37 | 1–0 BOS |
| 2nd | BOS | Brad Marchand (10) | Dennis Seidenberg (9) and Mark Recchi (9) | 12:13 | 2–0 BOS |
| 2nd | BOS | Patrice Bergeron (6) – sh | Dennis Seidenberg (10) and Gregory Campbell (3) | 17:35 | 3–0 BOS |
| 3rd | BOS | Brad Marchand (11) – en | Unassisted | 17:16 | 4–0 BOS |
Penalty summary
| Period | Team | Player | Penalty | Time | PIM |
| 1st | None | | | | |
| 2nd | BOS | Zdeno Chara | Interference | 16:07 | 2:00 |
| 3rd | VAN | Jannik Hansen | Interference | 05:33 | 2:00 |
| 3rd | BOS | Milan Lucic | Hooking | 11:34 | 2:00 |

Shots by period
| Team | 1 | 2 | 3 | Total |
|---|---|---|---|---|
| BOS | 5 | 8 | 8 | 21 |
| VAN | 8 | 13 | 16 | 37 |

== Television ==
In Canada, the series was televised in English on CBC and in French on the cable network RDS. In the United States, NBC broadcast the first two and final three games, while Versus (now NBCSN) televised games three and four.

=== Ratings ===
Game one on NBC drew the best television ratings for a first game since game one of the 1999 Stanley Cup Final, drawing a 3.2 rating, up 14 percent from game one of the 2010 Finals. The rating was boosted by heavy interest in Boston's large market, which posted a 25.5/39, topping the 19.1/34 for game one of the 2010 NBA Finals between the Boston Celtics and the Los Angeles Lakers.

In contrast, game two drew just 3.37 million viewers for NBC, making it the least-watched Stanley Cup Final broadcast on U.S. network television since game five in 2007, which also was the last time a Canadian team (the Ottawa Senators) advanced to the Cup Finals.

Games six, five and one are the third, fourth, and fifth most-watched CBC Sports programs with an average Canadian audience of 6.6 million, 6.1 million, and 5.6 million viewers respectively, after the men's ice hockey gold medal game between Canada and the United States at the 2002 Winter Olympics. Game seven was the highest rated game on both sides of the border. In Canada, it was second most-watched CBC Sports program, drawing an average of 8.76 million viewers and trailing only the men's gold medal game in ice hockey at the 2002 Winter Olympics; In the US, NBC's broadcast drew a 5.7 national overnight rating and a 10 share (numbers that equaled game seven of the 2003 Stanley Cup Final), a number later updated to 8.5 million viewers, making the game the most watched NHL broadcast in the US since 1973. In the Boston market alone, the broadcast pulled in a 43.4 rating and a 64 share.

== Vancouver riots ==
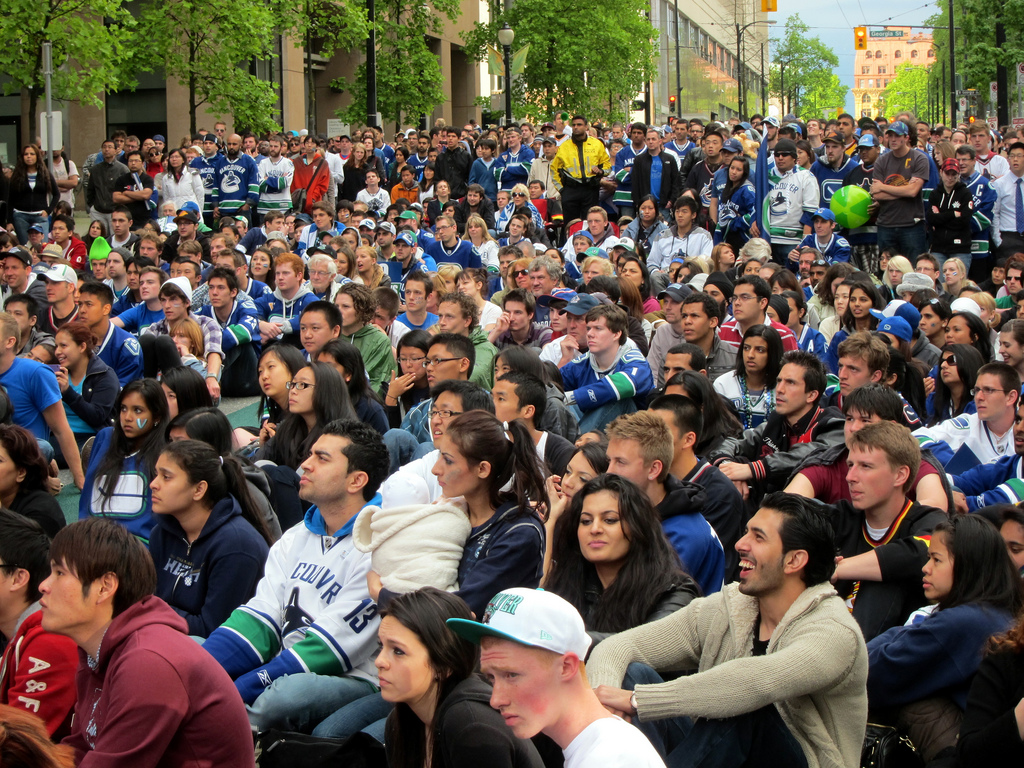
Fans watching the finals in Vancouver

The seventh and final game of the series attracted huge crowds on the streets of Vancouver who gathered to watch the game on outside monitors and cheer the home team on. Shortly before the game ended with the apparent loss for Vancouver, fires were set on West Georgia Street. After the game ended, cars were set on fire and fighting broke out. Soon, a riot was in progress in downtown Vancouver, with police cars set on fire, shops looted and attendant destruction of property. The damage was expected to be greater than the 1994 Vancouver riots that occurred after Vancouver lost the Stanley Cup Final in seven games to the New York Rangers.

== Officials ==
- Referees: Dan O'Halloran, Dan O'Rourke, Kelly Sutherland, Stephen Walkom
- Linesmen: Steve Miller, Jean Morin, Pierre Racicot, Jay Sharrers

== Team rosters ==
Years indicated in boldface under the "Finals appearance" column signify that the player won the Stanley Cup in the given year.

=== Boston Bruins ===
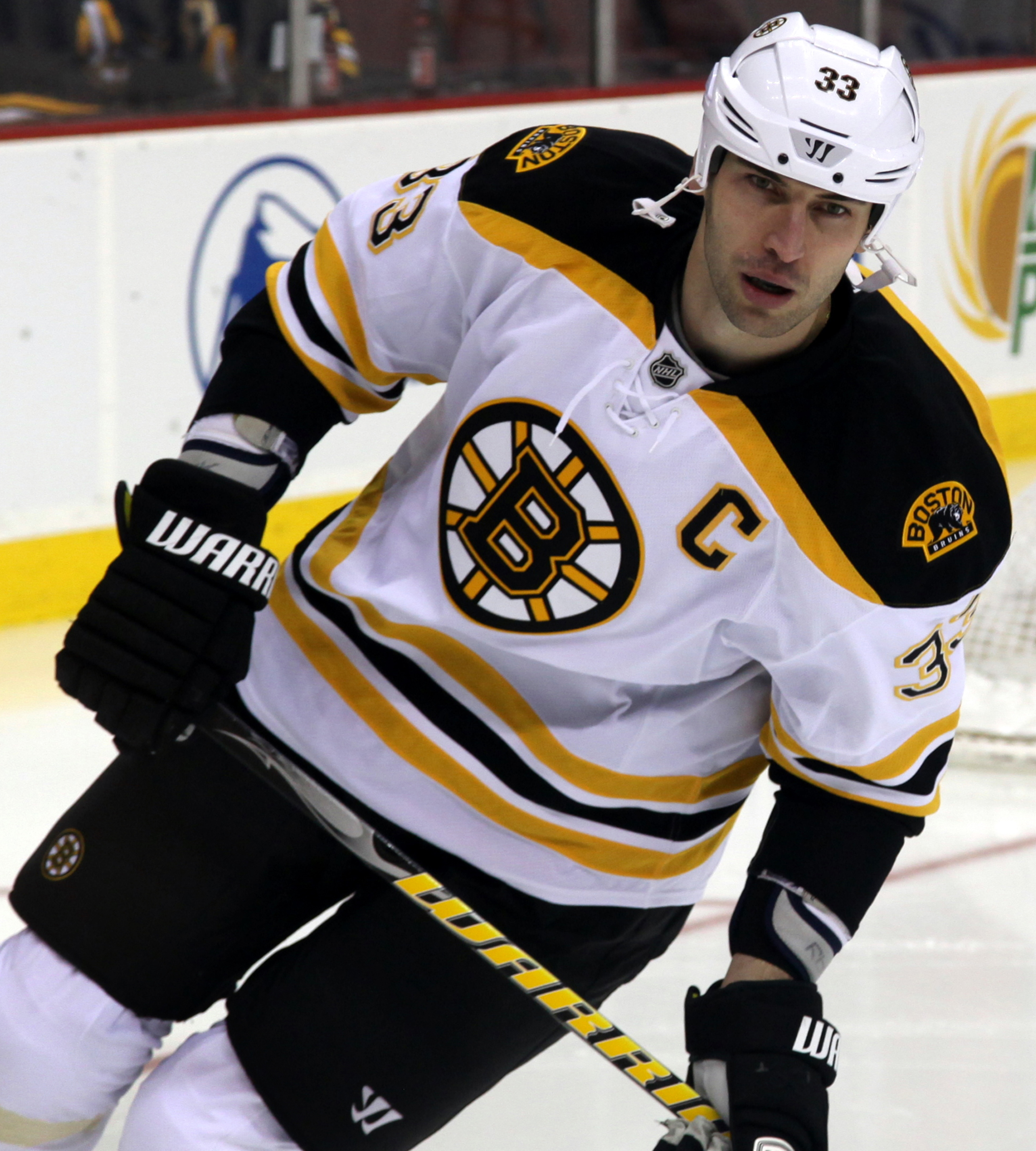
Zdeno Chara captained the Bruins to their first Stanley Cup championship in 39 years

| # | Nat | Player | Position | Hand | Acquired | Place of birth | Finals appearance |
|---|---|---|---|---|---|---|---|
| 37 | (Canada) | Patrice Bergeron – **A** | C | R | 2003 | L'Ancienne-Lorette, Quebec | first |
| 55 | (Canada) | Johnny Boychuk | D | R | 2008 | Edmonton, Alberta | first |
| 11 | (Canada) | Gregory Campbell | C | L | 2010 | London, Ontario | first |
| 33 | (Slovakia) | Zdeno Chara – **C** | D | L | 2006 | Trenčín, Czechoslovakia | first |
| 21 | (Canada) | Andrew Ference | D | L | 2007 | Edmonton, Alberta | second (2004) |
| 18 | (Canada) | Nathan Horton | RW | R | 2010 | Welland, Ontario | first |
| 12 | (Czech Republic) | Tomas Kaberle | D | L | 2011 | Rakovník, Czechoslovakia | first |
| 47 | (United States) | Steven Kampfer | D | R | 2007 | Ann Arbor, Michigan | first (did not play) |
| 23 | (Canada) | Chris Kelly | C | L | 2011 | Toronto, Ontario | second (2007) |
| 46 | (Czech Republic) | David Krejci | C | R | 2004 | Šternberk, Czechoslovakia | first |
| 17 | (Canada) | Milan Lucic | LW | L | 2006 | Vancouver, British Columbia | first |
| 63 | (Canada) | Brad Marchand | LW | L | 2006 | Halifax, Nova Scotia | first |
| 54 | (Canada) | Adam McQuaid | D | R | 2006 | Charlottetown, Prince Edward Island | first |
| 20 | (Canada) | Daniel Paille | LW | L | 2009 | Welland, Ontario | first |
| 49 | (Canada) | Rich Peverley | RW | R | 2011 | Guelph, Ontario | first |
| 40 | (Finland) | Tuukka Rask | G | L | 2006 | Savonlinna, Finland | first |
| 28 | (Canada) | Mark Recchi – **A** | RW | L | 2009 | Kamloops, British Columbia | third (**1991**, **2006**) |
| 73 | (Canada) | Michael Ryder | RW | R | 2008 | Bonavista, Newfoundland and Labrador | first |
| 91 | (Canada) | Marc Savard | C | L | 2006 | Ottawa, Ontario | first (did not play) |
| 19 | (Canada) | Tyler Seguin | RW | R | 2010 | Brampton, Ontario | first |
| 44 | (Germany) | Dennis Seidenberg | D | L | 2010 | Villingen-Schwenningen, West Germany | first |
| 30 | (United States) | Tim Thomas | G | L | 2002 | Flint, Michigan | first |
| 22 | (Canada) | Shawn Thornton | RW | R | 2007 | Oshawa, Ontario | second (**2007**) |

=== Vancouver Canucks ===
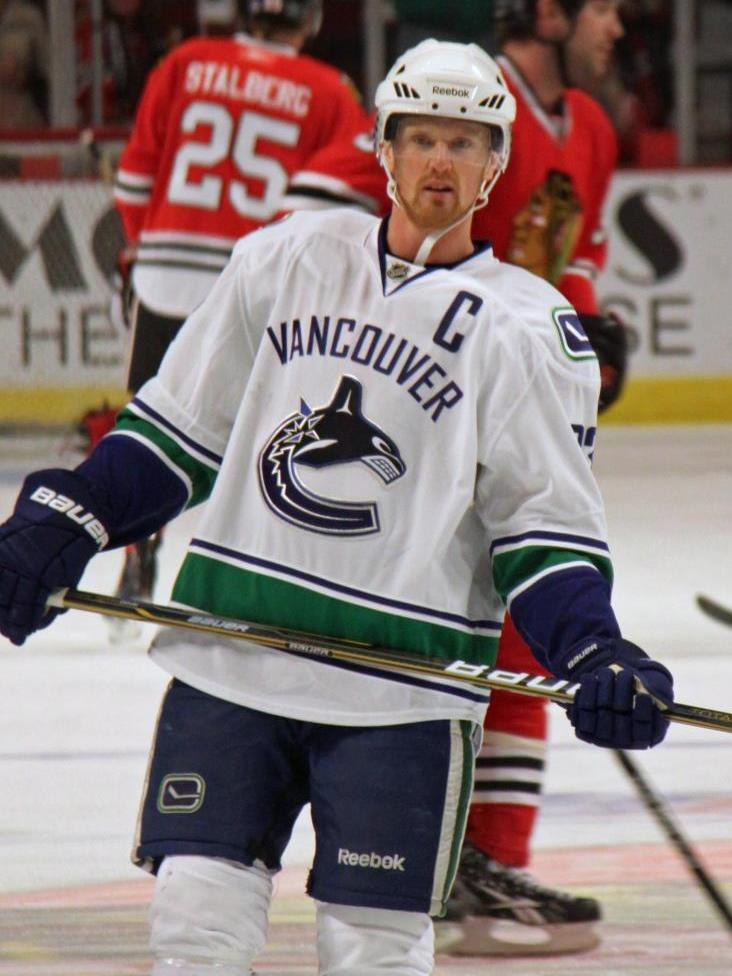
Henrik Sedin captained the Canucks to their first Stanley Cup Final appearance since 1994

| # | Nat | Player | Position | Hand | Acquired | Place of birth | Finals appearance |
|---|---|---|---|---|---|---|---|
| 41 | (United States) | Andrew Alberts | D | L | 2010 | Minneapolis, Minnesota | first |
| 4 | (United States) | Keith Ballard | D | L | 2010 | Baudette, Minnesota | first |
| 3 | (Canada) | Kevin Bieksa – **A** | D | R | 2001 | Grimsby, Ontario | first |
| 49 | (Canada) | Alexandre Bolduc | C | L | 2008 | Montreal, Quebec | first |
| 14 | (Canada) | Alex Burrows | LW | L | 2005 | Pincourt, Quebec | first |
| 23 | (Sweden) | Alexander Edler | D | L | 2004 | Östersund, Sweden | first |
| 5 | (Germany) | Christian Ehrhoff | D | L | 2009 | Moers, West Germany | first |
| 15 | (Canada) | Tanner Glass | LW | L | 2009 | Regina, Saskatchewan | first |
| 2 | (Canada) | Dan Hamhuis | D | L | 2010 | Smithers, British Columbia | first |
| 36 | (Denmark) | Jannik Hansen | RW | R | 2004 | Herlev, Denmark | first |
| 20 | (United States) | Chris Higgins | LW | L | 2011 | Smithtown, New York | first |
| 17 | (United States) | Ryan Kesler – **A** | C | R | 2003 | Livonia, Michigan | first |
| 40 | (Canada) | Maxim Lapierre | C | R | 2011 | Montreal, Quebec | first |
| 1 | (Canada) | Roberto Luongo | G | L | 2006 | Montreal, Quebec | first |
| 27 | (Canada) | Manny Malhotra – **A** | C | L | 2010 | Mississauga, Ontario | first |
| 38 | (Canada) | Victor Oreskovich | RW | R | 2010 | Whitby, Ontario | first |
| 21 | (Canada) | Mason Raymond | LW | L | 2005 | Cochrane, Alberta | first |
| 29 | (Canada) | Aaron Rome | D | L | 2009 | Brandon, Manitoba | second (**2007**) |
| 37 | (Canada) | Rick Rypien | C | R | 2005 | Blairmore, Alberta | first (did not play) |
| 6 | (Finland) | Sami Salo | D | R | 2002 | Turku, Finland | first |
| 26 | (Sweden) | Mikael Samuelsson | RW | R | 2009 | Mariefred, Sweden | third (**2008**, 2009) |
| 35 | (United States) | Cory Schneider | G | L | 2004 | Marblehead, Massachusetts | first |
| 22 | (Sweden) | Daniel Sedin – **A** | LW | L | 1999 | Örnsköldsvik, Sweden | first |
| 33 | (Sweden) | Henrik Sedin – **C** | C | L | 1999 | Örnsköldsvik, Sweden | first |
| 10 | (Canada) | Jeff Tambellini | LW | L | 2010 | Calgary, Alberta | first |
| 18 | (Canada) | Christopher Tanev | D | R | 2010 | Toronto, Ontario | first |
| 13 | (Canada) | Raffi Torres | LW | L | 2010 | Toronto, Ontario | second (2006) |

== Stanley Cup engraving ==
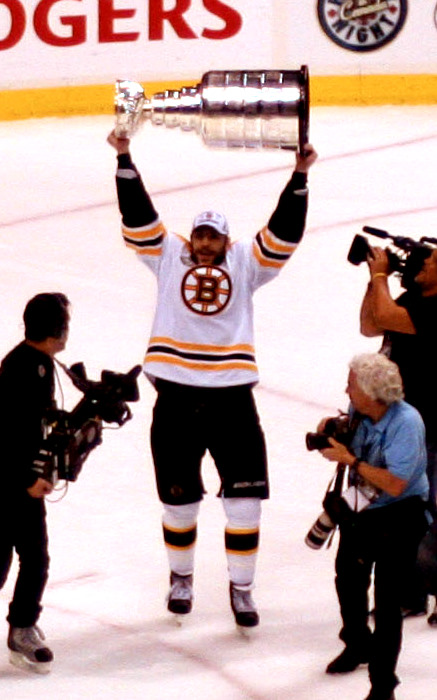
Milan Lucic hoists the Stanley Cup after Game seven

The 2011 Stanley Cup was presented to Boston Bruins' captain Zdeno Chara by NHL Commissioner Gary Bettman following the Bruins' 4–0 win over the Vancouver Canucks in the seventh game of the finals.

The following Bruins players and staff had their names engraved on the Stanley Cup

2010–11 Boston Bruins

=== Players ===
Centers

- 11 Gregory Campbell
- 19 Tyler Seguin*
- 23 Chris Kelly*
- 37 Patrice Bergeron (A)
- 46 David Krejci
- 49 Rich Peverley*
- 91 Marc Savard †

Wingers

- 17 Milan Lucic
- 18 Nathan Horton
- 20 Daniel Paille
- 22 Shawn Thornton
- 28 Mark Recchi (A)
- 63 Brad Marchand
- 73 Michael Ryder

Defencemen

- 12 Tomas Kaberle
- 21 Andrew Ference
- 33 Zdeno Chara (Captain)
- 44 Dennis Seidenberg
- 54 Adam McQuaid
- 55 Johnny Boychuk

Goaltenders

- 30 Tim Thomas
- 40 Tuukka Rask
- * Played both centre and wing.
- † Exemption granted to engrave the name of a player who did not automatically qualify. (Note: Automatic qualification for a player's name to be engraved on the Stanley Cup: Playing in (for a goaltender, dressing for) at least one Stanley Cup Final game or at least half of regular season games for the Stanley Cup winning team.)

=== Coaching and administrative staff ===
- Jeremy Jacobs Sr. (Chairman/Owner/Governor), Margaret Jacobs (Owner), Charles Jacobs (Owner/Alternate Governor), Jerry Jacobs Jr. (Alternate Governor/Owner)
- Louis Jacobs (Alternate Governor/Owner), Cam Neely (President/Alternate Governor), Peter Chiarelli (General Manager/Alternate Governor), Jim Benning (Asst. General Manager)
- Don Sweeney (Asst. General Manager), Claude Julien (Head Coach), Doug Jarvis (Asst. Coach), Geoff Ward (Asst. Coach)
- Doug Houda (Asst. Coach), Bob Essensa (Goaltending Coach), Harry Sinden (Senior Advisor), John Bucyk (Road Service Coordinator)
- Scott Bradley (Director of Player Personnel), Wayne Smith (Director of Amateur Scouting), John Weisbrod (Director of Collegiate Scouting), Adam Creighton (Scout),
- Tom McVie (Scout), Dale Hamilton-Powers (Director of Administration), Matt Chmura (Director of Communications),
- Don DelNegro (Athletic Trainer), John Whitesides (Strength-Conditioning Coach), Derek Repucci (Asst. Athletic Trainer/Massage Therapist), Keith Robinson (Equipment Manager),
- Jim "Beets" Johnson (Asst. Equipment Manager), Scott Waugh (Physical Therapist)

=== Engraving notes ===
- #91 Marc Savard (C) – played 25 regular season games and no playoff games due to multiple concussions, but spent the entire season with the Bruins. The NHL granted the Bruins' request to have his name included on the Stanley Cup. Savard never played again in the NHL.
- Patrice Bergeron was given permission to include both his father and mother's surnames and be listed as "Patrice Bergeron-Cleary."
- Jeremy & Margaret Jacobs' last name was listed only once for both owners.
- Jim Johnson (Asst. Equipment Manager) was given permission to include his nickname "Beets."

=== Included in the team picture, but left off the Stanley Cup ===
- #34 Shane Hnidy (D) –3 regular season games for Boston, and 3 playoff games for Boston
- #47 Steven Kampfer (D) – played 38 regular season games for Boston and 22 games with the AHL's Providence Bruins
- #38 Jordan Caron (RW) – 23 regular season games and none in the playoffs
- #72 Jamie Arniel (C) – 1 regular season game with the Bruins (the only NHL game of his career) and spent the rest of the regular season with the Providence Bruins of the American Hockey League having played 78 games.
- #43 Matt Bartkowski (D) – 6 regular season games and none in the playoffs
- #34 Colby Cohen (D) – did not play in the regular season or playoffs
- #35 Anton Khudobin (G) – did not play in the regular season or playoffs
- #42 Trent Whitfield (C) – did not play in the regular season or playoffs
- Eight players on the roster did not have their names engraved on the Stanley Cup due to not qualifying. The NHL declined the team's request to have the names of Hnidy and Kampfer engraved. Neither had played enough games for the Boston Bruins during the season. Boston added the two scouts who had been with the team the longest in their place. Boston did not ask for an exemption for the other six players on the roster who did not have their names engraved. These eight players were included in the team picture and awarded rings.
- Matt Falconer (Asst. Equipment Manager).
- Seven scouts were left off the Stanley Cup (due to 52 name limit), but all were awarded Stanley Cup Rings.
- In total, the Bruins gave out a record 504 Stanley Cup rings, including non-team personnel such as ticket agents, the office staff, National Anthem singer Rene Rancourt, commentators Jack Edwards and Andy Brickley, popcorn vendors and TD Garden security officers.

== See also ==
- 2011 Stanley Cup playoffs

== Notes ==
| Preceded by Chicago Blackhawks; 2010 | Boston Bruins; Stanley Cup champions 2011 | Succeeded by Los Angeles Kings; 2012 |
