= Todd Angilly =

American singer

- Born: February 15, 1975 (age 51); Warwick, Rhode Island, U.S.
- Occupation: Singer

Todd Angilly (born February 15, 1975) is an American singer who is best known for performing the national anthem at home games of the National Hockey League's Boston Bruins. Angilly has regularly performed both "The Star-Spangled Banner" and "O Canada" at Bruins games since 2019. He got his start singing The Star-Spangled Banner at Boston Red Sox games in the early 2000s and has since performed the song for all five professional New England based sports teams.

== Early life ==
Todd Angilly was born on February 15, 1975 in Warwick, Rhode Island to his parents Robert and Sandra Angilly. His mother learned singing through her church growing up. He and his three other brothers would sing in choirs, starting at an early age. Throughout elementary and middle school, Angilly continued to expand his singing abilities. During his time at Warwick Veteran’s High School he was captain of the school's football team, acted in plays and was in the schools band.

Angilly then began attending Plymouth State University in 1995, where he continued to act in school musicals and perform in local opera shows. He eventually earned a bachelor’s degree in music, graduating in 1999.

== Career ==
Following graduation, Angilly was accepted into the opera program at the New England Conservatory in Boston. However, he ended up leaving conservatory two classes short of a master’s degree due to financial difficulties. Following this, Angilly began working as a probation officer and a cook at Fenway Park, where he often practiced singing while on the job. This led to him being discovered by a member of the front office staff who soon after invited him to perform the national anthem at a Red Sox game. He then became a regular in the rotation at Red Sox games. Similarly, Angilly worked as a cook for the New England Patriots who also let him sing the national anthem during games at Sullivan Stadium.

Once Angilly stopped singing for the Red Sox and Patriots, he began working as a bartender at the TD Garden during Boston Bruins and Celtics games. Angilly’s first time singing at a Bruins game came unexpectedly one night on November 2, 2017 while Angilly was tending the bar before a game. He was summoned downstairs by the coordinator for the national anthem, who told Angilly that the fill-in singer didn’t show, and he needed to sing the anthem. Angilly later stated "It was 6:45 p.m. and the Anthem went on at 6:55 p.m. They rushed me downstairs, handed me a suit coat, and I sang."

During the 2018-19 season Angilly served as a fill in singer for the Bruins for 16 games,. Following the retirement of long time Bruins anthem singer Rene Rancourt at the end of that season, Angilly applied and beat out 600 other singers to become the Bruins new anthem singer, which was announced on October 3, 2019. He has held the position for 5+ years and still serves as a bartender during games.

== Personal life ==
Angilly is married to his wife Alycia who he met while working as a bartender at the TD Garden. They have two children, Luke and Cassandra, and reside in Lynnfield, Massachusetts.

Outside of singing Angilly worked as a probation officer for over 20 years. He now serves as a director of workforce development at the Executive Office of Public Safety and Security. In 2025 Angilly was honored as the Top Director of the Year in Workforce Development by the International Association of Top Professionals for his outstanding leadership.

In March of 2024, Angilly announced he would be running as an independent for the Essex County, Massachusetts Clerk of Courts office. However, he fell to the incumbent Thomas Driscoll.
