= John Kiley =

American musician

John Kiley (November 1, 1912 – July 15, 1993) was the organist at Braves Field from 1948 to 1952, Fenway Park from 1953 to 1989 and at the Boston Garden from 1941 to 1984. He is credited with having discovered Rene Rancourt, the Boston Garden's longtime resident singer.

Kiley was a veteran movie theater organist from the silent film era. In the early 1950s, he recorded a number of songs on the then Boston Music Hall Wurlitzer pipe organ (4 manuals, 22 ranks). These were originally released on the budget Spin-O-Rama label under the title "The Majesty of the Big Pipe Organ". However, soon after the first release, the same tracks ("Poor Johnny One Note," "Tell Me Pretty Maiden," "Roamin' in the Gloamin'," "Dark Eyes," "O Promise Me," among others) began appearing on releases on other budget record labels under different pseudonyms ("William Daly," "John Minger," "Ralph Kramer," "Don Ayers," "George Ryan," etc.)

According to a 1993 Boston Globe obituary: "From the age of 15, when he made his professional musician's debut at the Criterion Theater in Roxbury, Kiley played in many Greater Boston movie theaters. In 1934 he switched to radio and was music director for the next 22 years at radio station WMEX." In later years, he appeared at a number of Boston-area science fiction conventions and other gatherings of film buffs where he played the organ for showings of silent era classics.

A popular trivia question among Boston-area sports fans in the 1970s was "Who is the only man to play for the Red Sox, the Bruins, and the Celtics?"—referring to Kiley, who played the organs at both Fenway Park and the Boston Garden.

The organ that Kiley played at Braves Field from 1948 and 1949 was later upgraded in 1950. It was said that the organ was state of the art and so loud that it could be heard all the way to Kenmore Square, about a mile away. He was known to play "The Mexican Hat Dance" during Braves rallies. The organ that Kiley played at Fenway Park was a Hammond X-66. At Boston Garden it was a Hammond C-3, later a Kimball. After his departure at Boston Garden in 1983, he was succeeded by Ron Harry, who played until the building's closing in 1995, and in the new building for the Celtics until his death in 2004.

== See also ==
- Sherm Feller
