= Michael Ryder =

Canadian ice hockey player (born 1980)

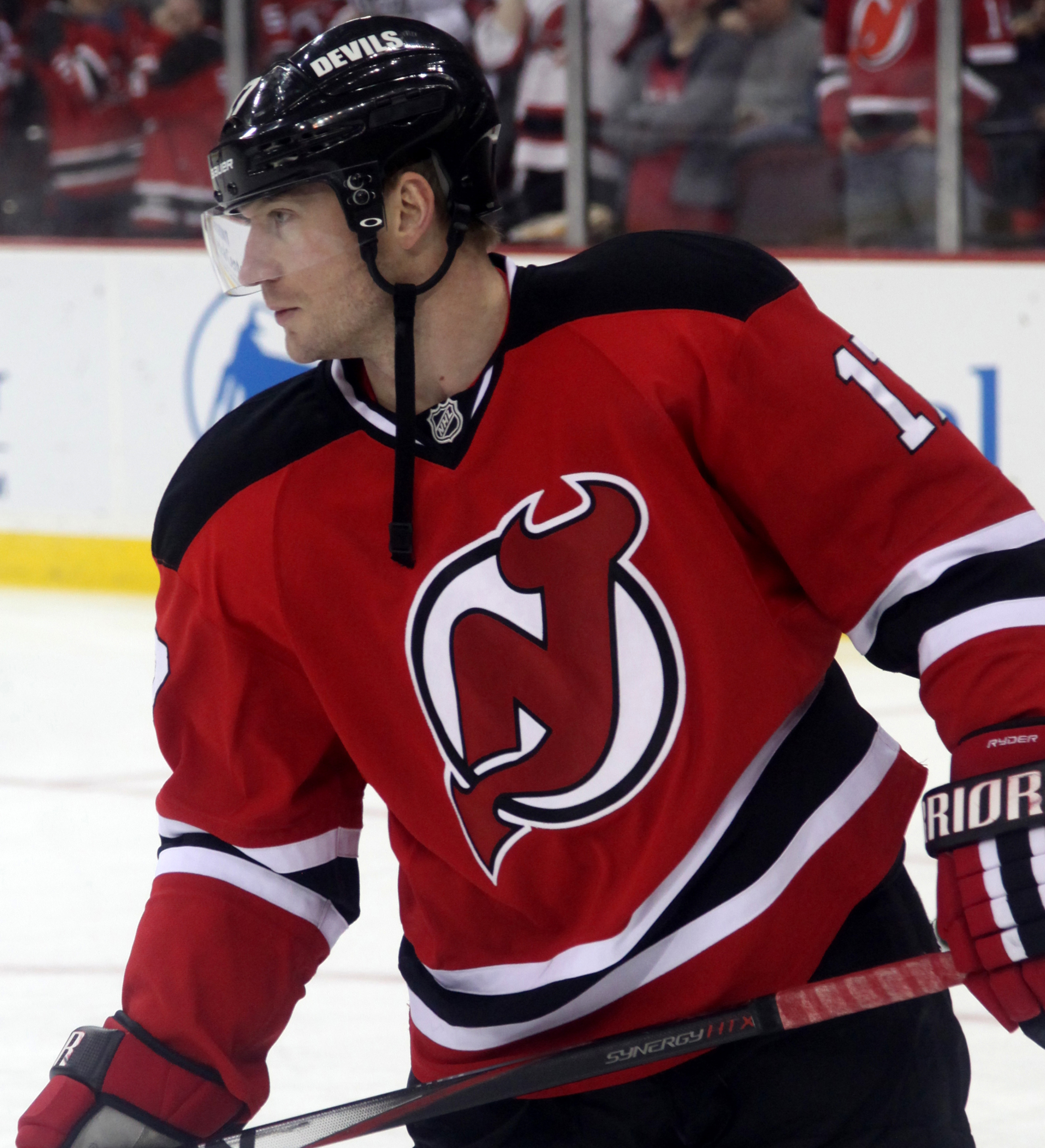
- Ryder with the New Jersey Devils in April 2014
- Born: March 31, 1980 (age 46) Bonavista, Newfoundland, Canada
- Height: 6 ft 1 in (185 cm)
- Weight: 200 lb (91 kg; 14 st 4 lb)
- Position: Right wing
- Shot: Right
- Played for: Montreal Canadiens; Boston Bruins; Dallas Stars; New Jersey Devils
- NHL draft: 216th overall, 1998; Montreal Canadiens
- Playing career: 2000–2015

Michael Ryder (born March 31, 1980) is a Canadian former professional ice hockey right winger. He played 12 seasons in the National Hockey League (NHL) with the Montreal Canadiens, Boston Bruins, Dallas Stars, and New Jersey Devils.

Ryder was a member of the 2011 Stanley Cup-winning Bruins squad, scoring eight goals during the 2011 Stanley Cup Playoffs to help Boston to their first title since 1972.

== Early life ==
Ryder was born on March 31, 1980, in Bonavista, Newfoundland and Labrador, Canada to parents Wayne and Debbie Ryder. He also grew up alongside his younger brother Daniel, who also played ice hockey.

== Playing career ==
=== Junior ===
Ryder played for the Hull Olympiques of the QMJHL.

=== Montreal Canadiens ===
Ryder was drafted by the Montreal Canadiens in the 1998 NHL entry draft, 8th round, 216th overall. He hired hockey agent Thayne Campbell before signing with Montreal.

On May 30, 2003, Ryder scored the winning goal to end the longest game in American Hockey League history. His goal at 14:56 of the fourth overtime period gave the Hamilton Bulldogs a 2–1 win over the Houston Aeros in game two of the Calder Cup Finals.

In the 2003–04 NHL season, he played in the NHL YoungStars Game. He was named the NHL Rookie of the Month for February 2004. He finished the season leading all rookies in points, powerplay points, shots, and goals. During the 2004–05 NHL lockout he played for Leksands IF of the second division of Swedish hockey. He reached 30 goals in back-to-back seasons after the lockout.

On April 7, 2007, he scored a natural hat-trick in the second period against the Toronto Maple Leafs when the Canadiens were down 3–1. This was the most important game of the regular season since the Leafs, Canadiens, and the New York Islanders were vying for the last playoff spot in the Eastern Conference, and the game would determine which team would take the last playoff spot. Despite Ryder's effort, the Canadiens eventually lost the game 6–5.

The Canadiens fared better from another excellent performance from Ryder in a historic comeback against the New York Rangers on February 19, 2008. Ryder scored two goals and added an assist in a 6–5 win after the Canadiens were trailing by a score of 5–0. At the time, this comeback marked the only time the Canadiens won when trailing 5–0 in the team's 99-year history. Ryder was initially credited with a hat trick, however, his last goal was later changed as it was determined that his shot went off teammate Mark Streit's leg before hitting the back of the net.

Ryder's contract expired on June 30, 2008, and the Canadiens did not re-sign him, due in part to his scoring only 14 goals and 17 assists for 31 points, the lowest totals of his career. He also played in only 4 of Montreal's 12 playoff games.

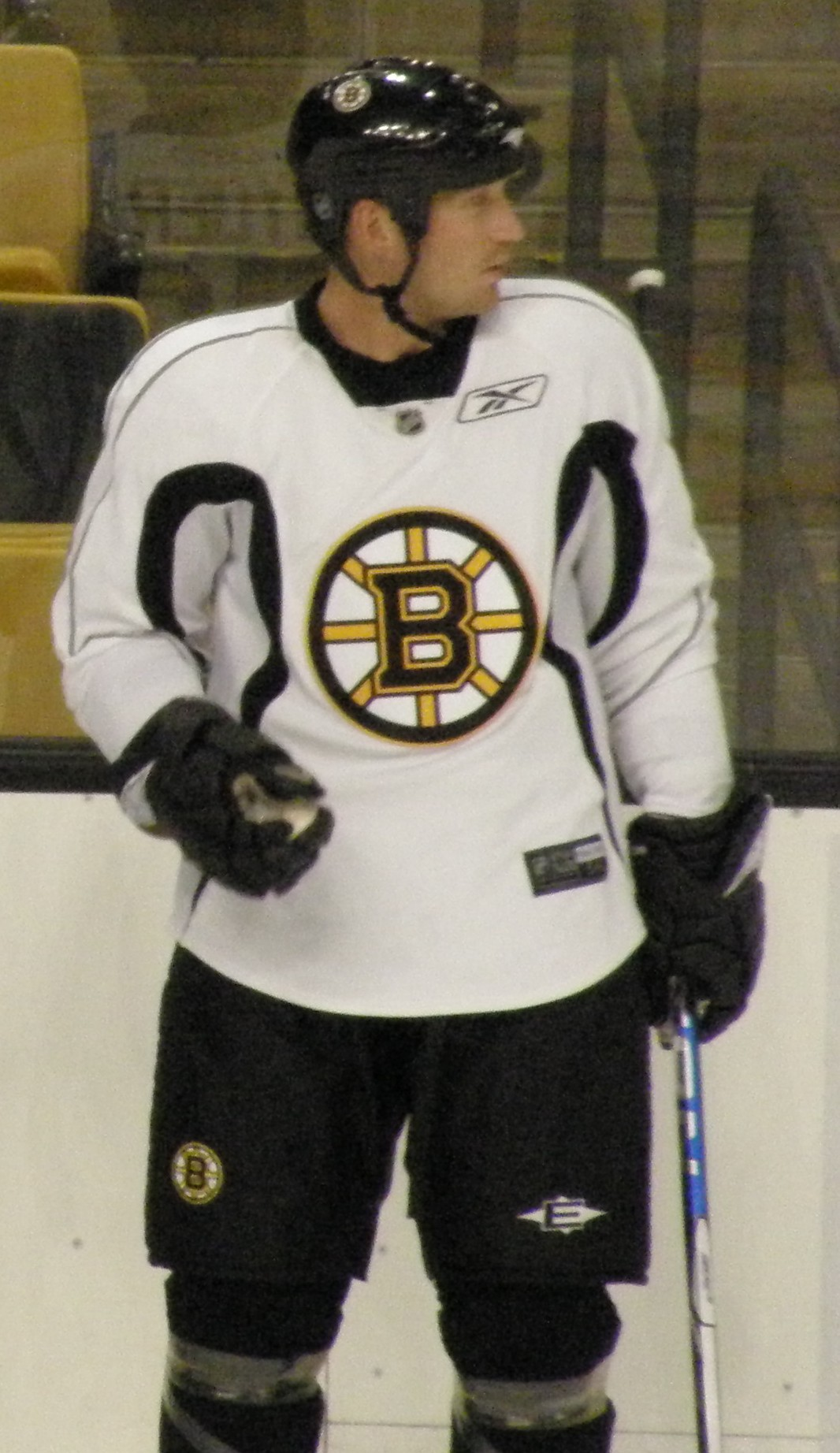
Ryder during a Bruins' practice in September 2008

=== Boston Bruins ===
On July 1, 2008, Ryder signed a contract with the Boston Bruins for 3 years worth approximately $4 million per season. It is thought that part of the reason Ryder signed with Boston was that Ryder has had nearly six seasons worth of play (three in junior hockey, one in the AHL and two with the Canadiens) under Claude Julien, the Bruins coach at the time.

On October 9, 2008, Ryder scored his first goal in a Bruins uniform in Boston's season opener against the Colorado Avalanche, a 5-4 Bruins victory. The goal coincidentally was Ryder's 100th career goal. He went on to score 27 goals in his first season with Boston as the Bruins clinched first overall in the Eastern Conference. Their first round matchup was with the eighth seeded Montreal Canadiens, Ryder's former club. He scored four goals in the series as the Bruins made quick work of Montreal, sweeping them in four straight games. Ryder was then held to only one goal during the Bruins seven game Conference semi-finals loss to the Carolina Hurricanes.

During the Bruins' first round matchup against the Canadiens in the 2011 Stanley Cup Playoffs, Ryder came up clutch again facing his former team. He scored the game-winning goal in overtime of game four and in game five, Ryder would go on to make a miraculous glove save while teammate and goaltender Tim Thomas was out of position. Later in 2022, the Bruins Director of Health, Fitness & Wellness, John Whitesides highlighted Ryder's glove save stating, "Without that play right there, there is no Stanley Cup in 2011."

Ryder won his first and only Stanley Cup on June 15, 2011, when the Bruins defeated the Vancouver Canucks 4-0 in game seven of the Stanley Cup Final. With this victory, Ryder became the second native of Newfoundland and Labrador to win a Stanley Cup championship after Daniel Cleary of Harbour Grace, who accomplished the feat with the Detroit Red Wings in 2008. Alex Newhook of the Colorado Avalanche joined these two when winning it in 2022.

=== Dallas Stars ===
On July 1, 2011, Ryder signed a two-year, $7 million contract with the Dallas Stars.

In the 2011–12 season, Ryder recorded his career high 35th goal during the Dallas Stars 3-1 win against the Edmonton Oilers on March 28, 2012, at Rexall Place in Edmonton.

=== Return to Montreal ===
During his second year with the Stars in the lockout shortened 2012–13 season, Ryder was traded back to the Montreal Canadiens, along with a third round pick in the 2013 NHL entry draft, in exchange for Erik Cole.

=== New Jersey Devils ===
On July 5, 2013, Ryder signed a two-year, $7 million contract with the New Jersey Devils. Due to the Devils' policy under Lou Lamoriello of numbers above 40 being prohibited, Ryder switched from wearing sweater 73 to 17 during his tenure with the club.

After starting strongly in the 2013–14 season with 16 goals, Ryder struggled in the second half of the season, with only 2 goals after January 11, 2014.

January 16, 2015, Ryder played in his 800th NHL game, with the Devils falling 5-1 to the Anaheim Ducks at the Honda Center in Anaheim.

=== End of career ===
Ryder's 237 goals and 484 total points in the NHL are records for players born in Newfoundland and Labrador, making him the province's most successful hockey player ever.

June 10, 2017 Michael Ryder was inducted into Hockey NL's Hall of Fame.

== Career statistics ==
=== Regular season and playoffs ===
| | | | Regular season | | | | | Playoffs |
| Season | Team | League | GP | G | A | Pts | PIM | GP | G | A | Pts | PIM |
|---|---|---|---|---|---|---|---|---|---|---|---|---|
| 1996–97 | Tri-Pen Osprey AAA | Midget | 23 | 31 | 17 | 48 | — | — | — | — | — | — |
| 1997–98 | Hull Olympiques | QMJHL | 69 | 34 | 28 | 62 | 41 | 10 | 4 | 2 | 6 | 4 |
| 1998–99 | Hull Olympiques | QMJHL | 69 | 44 | 43 | 87 | 65 | 23 | 20 | 16 | 36 | 39 |
| 1999–00 | Hull Olympiques | QMJHL | 63 | 50 | 58 | 108 | 50 | 15 | 11 | 17 | 28 | 28 |
| 2000–01 | Tallahassee Tiger Sharks | ECHL | 5 | 4 | 5 | 9 | 6 | — | — | — | — | — |
| 2000–01 | Quebec Citadelles | AHL | 61 | 6 | 9 | 15 | 14 | — | — | — | — | — |
| 2001–02 | Mississippi Sea Wolves | ECHL | 20 | 14 | 13 | 27 | 2 | — | — | — | — | — |
| 2001–02 | Quebec Citadelles | AHL | 50 | 11 | 17 | 28 | 9 | 3 | 0 | 1 | 1 | 2 |
| 2002–03 | Hamilton Bulldogs | AHL | 69 | 34 | 33 | 67 | 43 | 23 | 6 | 11 | 17 | 8 |
| 2003–04 | Montreal Canadiens | NHL | 81 | 25 | 38 | 63 | 26 | 11 | 1 | 2 | 3 | 4 |
| 2004–05 | Leksands IF | SWE.2 | 32 | 27 | 21 | 48 | 32 | 10 | 7 | 6 | 13 | 0 |
| 2005–06 | Montreal Canadiens | NHL | 81 | 30 | 25 | 55 | 40 | 6 | 2 | 3 | 5 | 0 |
| 2006–07 | Montreal Canadiens | NHL | 82 | 30 | 28 | 58 | 60 | — | — | — | — | — |
| 2007–08 | Montreal Canadiens | NHL | 70 | 14 | 17 | 31 | 30 | 4 | 0 | 0 | 0 | 2 |
| 2008–09 | Boston Bruins | NHL | 74 | 27 | 26 | 53 | 26 | 11 | 5 | 8 | 13 | 8 |
| 2009–10 | Boston Bruins | NHL | 82 | 18 | 15 | 33 | 35 | 13 | 4 | 1 | 5 | 2 |
| 2010–11 | Boston Bruins | NHL | 79 | 18 | 23 | 41 | 26 | 25 | 8 | 9 | 17 | 8 |
| 2011–12 | Dallas Stars | NHL | 82 | 35 | 27 | 62 | 46 | — | — | — | — | — |
| 2012–13 | Dallas Stars | NHL | 19 | 6 | 8 | 14 | 8 | — | — | — | — | — |
| 2012–13 | Montreal Canadiens | NHL | 27 | 10 | 11 | 21 | 8 | 5 | 1 | 1 | 2 | 2 |
| 2013–14 | New Jersey Devils | NHL | 82 | 18 | 16 | 34 | 18 | — | — | — | — | — |
| 2014–15 | New Jersey Devils | NHL | 47 | 6 | 13 | 19 | 30 | — | — | — | — | — |
| NHL totals | | | 806 | 237 | 247 | 484 | 353 | 75 | 21 | 24 | 45 | 26 |

=== International ===
| Year | Team | Event | Result | GP | G | A | Pts | PIM |
|---|---|---|---|---|---|---|---|---|
| 2000 | Canada | WJC | 3rd place, bronze medalist(s) | 7 | 1 | 3 | 4 | 6 |
| Junior totals | | | | 7 | 1 | 3 | 4 | 6 |
