= Mark Donnelly =

Canadian singer

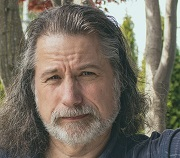
- Born: February 29, 1960 (age 66); Vancouver, British Columbia
- Occupation: Opera singer
- Known for: Anthem singer for the Vancouver Canucks (2001– Dec 2020)
- Spouse: Catherine
- Website: markemersondonnelly.com

Mark Emerson Donnelly (born February 29, 1960) is a Canadian singer noted for singing the national anthem "O Canada" at the National Hockey League's Vancouver Canucks home games.

== Biography ==
Donnelly was born and raised in Vancouver and North Delta, playing ice hockey from the age of 12. After earning a Bachelor of Music degree from the University of British Columbia, he began singing national anthems for the Wilkes-Barre/Scranton Penguins of the American Hockey League while working for a Scranton, Pennsylvania parish. After he and his family moved back to Vancouver, he started doing the same for the Vancouver Canucks beginning in 2001.

He made a cameo appearance in the TV show Psych, playing an opera singer in the season four premiere episode "Extradition: British Columbia", and then another cameo appearance as a singer in the final episode "Apotheosis" of the science fiction series Caprica.

He, his wife Catherine, and their nine children currently reside in White Rock, British Columbia. His brother, Lawrence, is the priest of Sts. Joachim and Ann Parish in Aldergrove. He is a staunch supporter of the Canadian anti-abortion movement.

On October 3 2014, Donnelly tripped over a carpet at Centre ice while performing the national anthem at a VEES game. Donnelly later stated that the carpet was supposed to be rolled up before he took the ice.

On December 4, 2020, the Vancouver Canucks cut ties with Donnelly, via Twitter, after it came out that he planned on singing at an anti-mask rally.
