= Johnny Boychuk =

Canadian ice hockey player (born 1984)

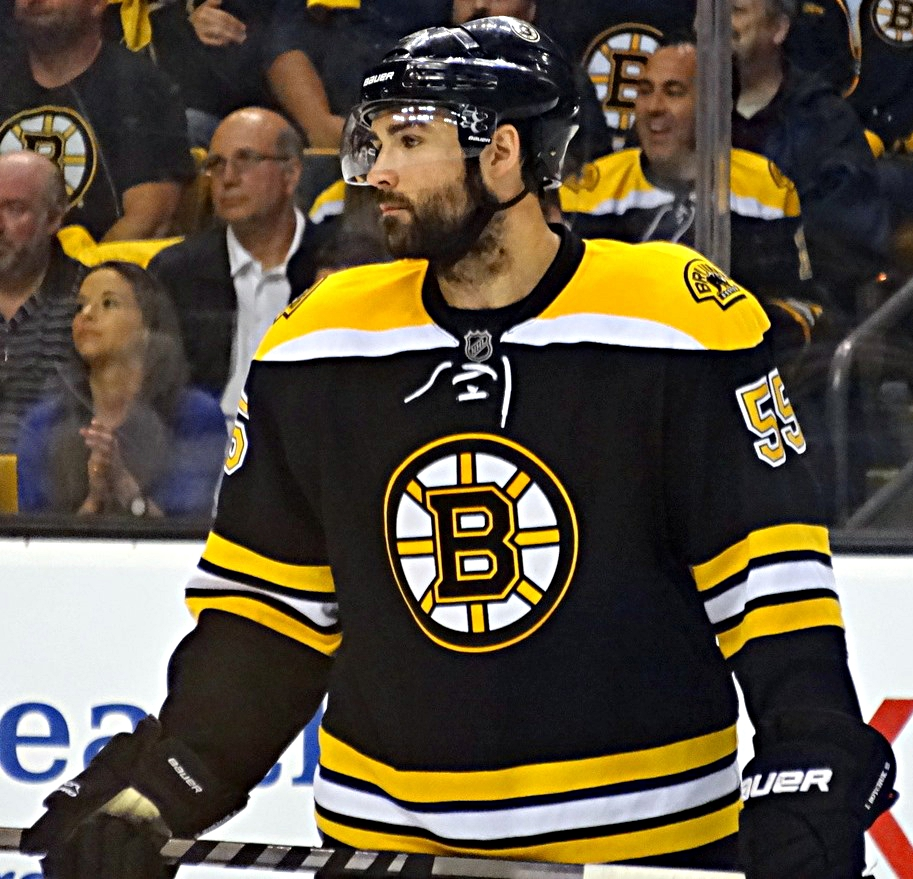
- Boychuk with the Boston Bruins in June 2013
- Born: January 19, 1984 (age 42) Edmonton, Alberta, Canada
- Height: 6 ft 2 in (188 cm)
- Weight: 227 lb (103 kg; 16 st 3 lb)
- Position: Defence
- Shot: Right
- Played for: Colorado Avalanche; Boston Bruins; New York Islanders
- NHL draft: 61st overall, 2002; Colorado Avalanche
- Playing career: 2004–2020

John Paul Boychuk (born January 19, 1984) is a Canadian former professional ice hockey defenceman. Drafted 61st overall in 2002 by the Colorado Avalanche, he played for the Colorado Avalanche, the Boston Bruins and New York Islanders of the National Hockey League (NHL). In 2011, he was a part of the Bruins' Stanley Cup championship team. He was traded to the Islanders prior to the 2014–15 season, where he would announce retirement after six seasons with the team.

== Playing career ==
As a youth, Boychuk played in the 1997 Quebec International Pee-Wee Hockey Tournament with a minor ice hockey team from Edmonton.

Boychuk was drafted 61st overall in the National Hockey League's (NHL) 2002 Entry Draft by the Colorado Avalanche. Prior to being drafted, he played with the Western Hockey League's (WHL) Calgary Hitmen. Boychuk made his professional debut with the Hershey Bears in the 2004–05 season. Boychuk spent the next four years in the Avalanche organization playing primarily for their American Hockey League (AHL) affiliates. He made his NHL debut in the 2007–08 season on January 5, 2008, against the New York Islanders. Boychuk made his debut as a forward playing on the wing rather than his usual defenceman position.

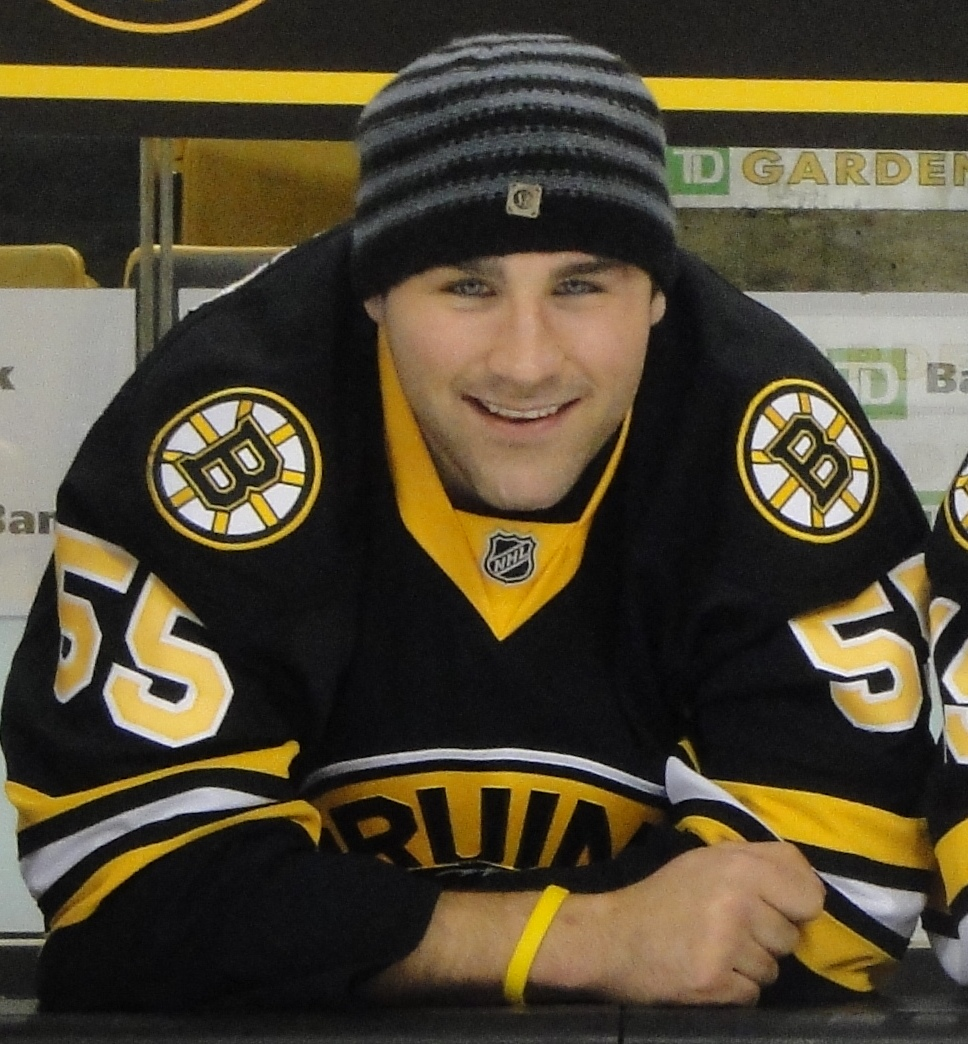
Boychuk with the Boston Bruins in December 2010

On June 24, 2008, Boychuk was traded to the Boston Bruins in exchange for Matt Hendricks. He was assigned to their AHL affiliate, the Providence Bruins, to start the 2008–09 season and in his first week was named "AHL Player of the Week." On December 1, 2008, Boychuk was recalled to Boston and made his Bruins debut in a 3–1 victory over the Tampa Bay Lightning on December 4, 2008. Boychuk was then returned to Providence for the rest of the season, where he played a break-out season, capturing the Eddie Shore Award by leading the league with 20 goals and 45 assists among defenceman and being named to the AHL's First All-Star Team.

On July 1, 2009, Boychuk secured his first one-way contract when he re-signed with the Bruins for the 2009–10 season. After initially making the Bruins opening night roster, Boychuk was primarily a healthy scratch in the first months of the season. After returning from a conditioning assignment in Providence, he established himself within the Bruins as a two-way defenceman to finish with 15 points in 51 games to earn a two-year contract extension on June 24, 2010.

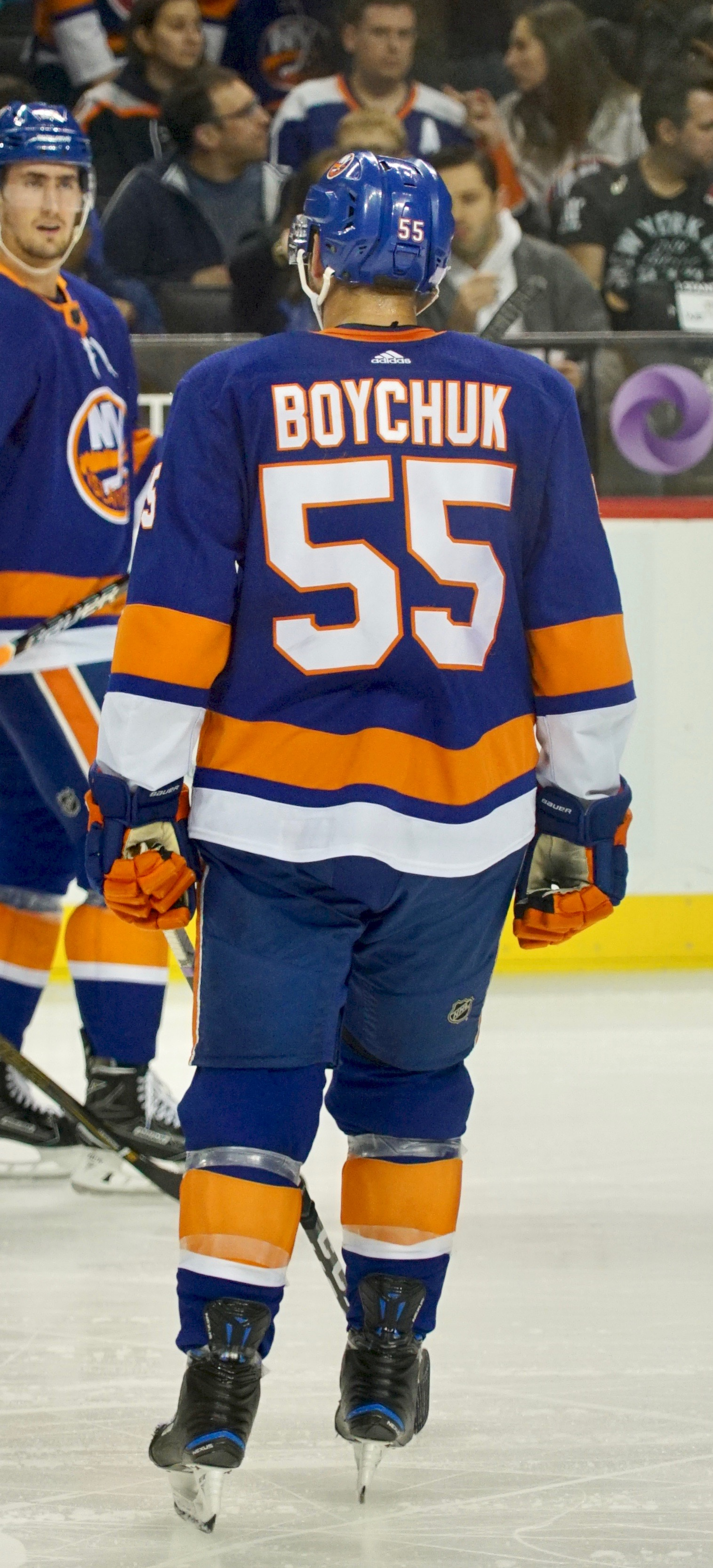
Boychuk with the New York Islanders in November 2017.

He was a member of the Bruins when they defeated the Vancouver Canucks to win the 2011 Stanley Cup Finals.

The following season, Boychuk was rewarded with a three-year contract extension to remain a fixture on the Stanley Cup-winning Bruins blueline. Despite an inability to successfully defend the Stanley Cup, Boychuk produced 15 points in 77 games.

During the 2012–13 NHL lock-out, Boychuk ventured to Europe and signed a temporary contract in Austria with EC Red Bull Salzburg of the EBEL on November 16, 2012. He scored two goals and posted eight points in 15 games before he returned to the Bruins for the shortened 2012–13 season.

On October 4, 2014, due to salary cap constraints, Boychuk was traded to the New York Islanders in exchange for two second-round draft picks in the 2015 (previously acquired from the Philadelphia Flyers, later used to select Brandon Carlo) and 2016 NHL entry drafts (used on Ryan Lindgren), as well as a conditional third-rounder in the 2015 Draft (condition was never met). In his Islanders debut, Boychuk scored a goal and two assists against the Carolina Hurricanes. On March 12, 2015, he signed a seven-year, $42 million contract extension with the Islanders, lasting through the 2021–22 season.

On November 25, 2020, the Islanders announced that Boychuk would be retiring due to an eye injury that he suffered in a game against the Montreal Canadiens on March 3, 2020.

In a salary cap move, the Buffalo Sabres acquired Boychuk's remaining contract from the Islanders on November 4, 2021.

== Post-playing career ==
Shortly after his retirement from the NHL, Boychuk was hired in a player development role for the New York Islanders.

== Personal life ==
In the summer of 2011 John married Sheena Burletoff. The couple have twin daughters and a son. John Quenneville, who was drafted by the New Jersey Devils in the 2014 NHL entry draft, is his nephew by marriage.

== Career statistics ==
=== Regular season and playoffs ===
			Regular season					Playoffs
Season	Team	League	GP	G	A	Pts	PIM	GP	G	A	Pts	PIM
1999–2000	MLAC AAA	AMHL	35	6	17	23	59	—	—	—	—	—
1999–2000	Calgary Hitmen	WHL	1	0	0	0	0	—	—	—	—	—
2000–01	Calgary Hitmen	WHL	66	4	8	12	61	12	1	1	2	17
2001–02	Calgary Hitmen	WHL	70	8	32	40	85	7	1	1	2	6
2002–03	Calgary Hitmen	WHL	40	8	18	26	58	—	—	—	—	—
2002–03	Moose Jaw Warriors	WHL	27	5	17	22	32	13	2	6	8	29
2003–04	Moose Jaw Warriors	WHL	62	13	20	33	71	10	1	9	10	9
2004–05	Hershey Bears	AHL	80	3	12	15	69	—	—	—	—	—
2005–06	Lowell Lock Monsters	AHL	74	6	26	32	73	—	—	—	—	—
2006–07	Albany River Rats	AHL	80	10	18	28	125	5	1	1	2	4
2007–08	Colorado Avalanche	NHL	4	0	0	0	0	—	—	—	—	—
2007–08	Lake Erie Monsters	AHL	60	8	18	26	63	—	—	—	—	—
2008–09	Boston Bruins	NHL	1	0	0	0	0	—	—	—	—	—
2008–09	Providence Bruins	AHL	78	20	46	66	61	16	3	5	8	19
2009–10	Boston Bruins	NHL	51	5	10	15	43	13	2	4	6	6
2009–10	Providence Bruins	AHL	2	1	0	1	0	—	—	—	—	—
2010–11	Boston Bruins	NHL	69	3	13	16	45	25	3	6	9	12
2011–12	Boston Bruins	NHL	77	5	10	15	53	7	1	2	3	4
2012–13	EC Red Bull Salzburg	EBEL	15	2	6	8	2	—	—	—	—	—
2012–13	Boston Bruins	NHL	44	1	5	6	12	22	6	1	7	10
2013–14	Boston Bruins	NHL	75	5	18	23	45	12	1	1	2	2
2014–15	New York Islanders	NHL	72	9	26	35	14	7	0	2	2	2
2015–16	New York Islanders	NHL	70	9	16	25	31	11	0	0	0	4
2016–17	New York Islanders	NHL	66	6	17	23	19	—	—	—	—	—
2017–18	New York Islanders	NHL	58	6	12	18	30	—	—	—	—	—
2018–19	New York Islanders	NHL	74	3	16	19	25	4	0	1	1	0
2019–20	New York Islanders	NHL	64	2	9	11	14	3	0	0	0	0
NHL totals			725	54	152	206	331	104	13	17	30	40

=== International ===
Year	Team	Event	Result	GP	G	A	Pts	PIM
2002	Canada	WJC18	6th	5	1	0	1	8
Junior totals				5	1	0	1	8

== Awards and honours ==
Award	Year
AHL
First All-Star Team	2009
Eddie Shore Award	2009
NHL
Stanley Cup	2011
