= Steven Kampfer =

American ice hockey player (born 1988)

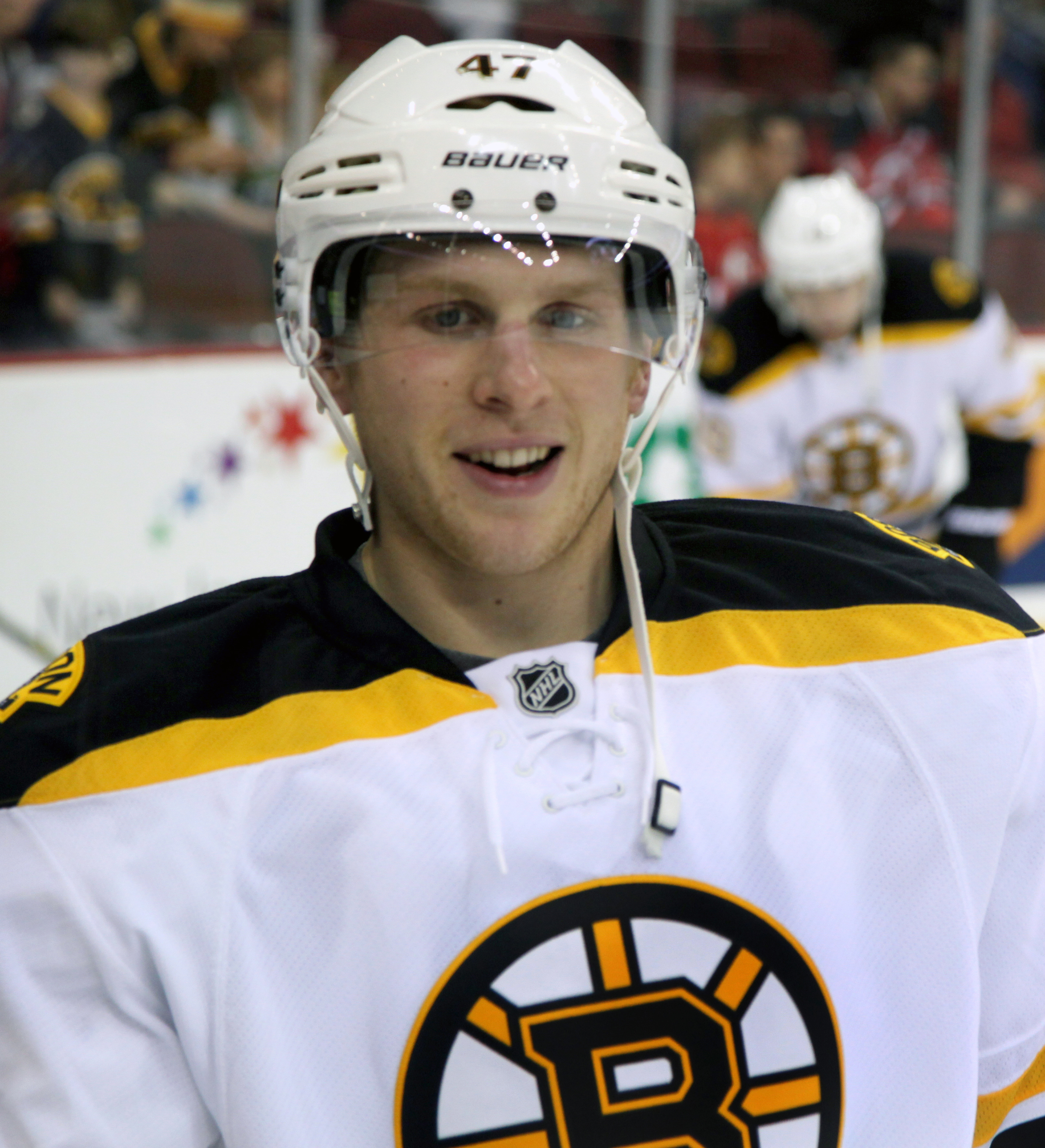
- Kampfer with the Boston Bruins in 2012
- Born: September 24, 1988 (age 37) Ann Arbor, Michigan, U.S.
- Height: 5 ft 11 in (180 cm)
- Weight: 198 lb (90 kg; 14 st 2 lb)
- Position: Defense
- Shot: Right
- Played for: Boston Bruins; Minnesota Wild; Florida Panthers; New York Rangers; Ak Bars Kazan; Traktor Chelyabinsk
- National team: United States
- NHL draft: 93rd overall, 2007; Anaheim Ducks
- Playing career: 2010–2025

Steven Allan Kampfer (born September 24, 1988) is an American former professional ice hockey defenseman. He was selected by the Anaheim Ducks of the National Hockey League (NHL) in the fourth round, 93rd overall, of the 2007 NHL entry draft. He played for the Boston Bruins, Minnesota Wild, Florida Panthers, and New York Rangers in the National Hockey League (NHL). Kampfer was born in Ann Arbor, Michigan, but grew up in Jackson, Michigan.

== Playing career ==
As a youth, Kampfer played in the 2002 Quebec International Pee-Wee Hockey Tournament with the Detroit Little Caesars minor ice hockey team.

=== Collegiate ===
Kampfer played four seasons with the University of Michigan from 2006–2010, with 60 points in 147 games. On October 12, 2008, Kampfer was involved in an incident in which he engaged in a late-night argument with a woman outside of a bar after she allegedly made flirtatious remarks to other men in order to antagonize Kampfer. After the argument, Kampfer engaged in an altercation with Michigan football player Michael Milano, a friend of the woman. Words were exchanged before Milano attacked Kampfer, resulting in Kampfer suffering a serious head injury. Milano was later convicted of aggravated assault.

=== Professional ===
Kampfer was selected by the Anaheim Ducks of the National Hockey League (NHL) in the fourth round, 93rd overall, of the 2007 NHL entry draft. On March 2, 2010, the Ducks traded the rights to Kampfer to the Boston Bruins in exchange for a conditional fourth-round draft pick. (Note: The fourth-round pick was later traded by Anaheim to the Carolina Hurricanes along with Justin Pogge in exchange for Aaron Ward. The Hurricanes selected Justin Shugg with the pick.) The Bruins signed him to a three-year entry-level contract and assigned him to their American Hockey League (AHL) affiliate, the Providence Bruins, for the remainder of the 2009–10 AHL season.

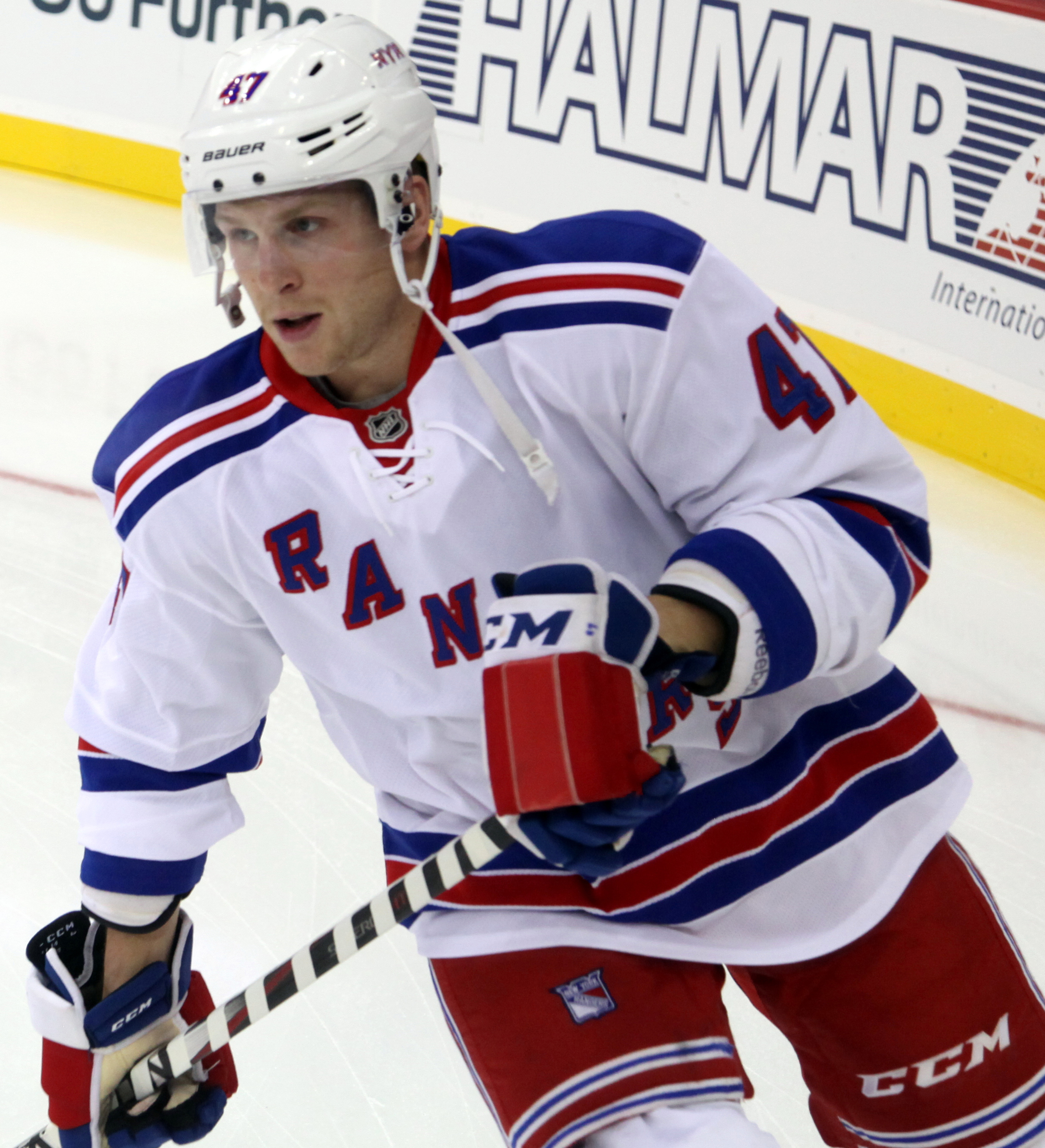
Kampfer as a Ranger during an exhibition game in October 2014

Kampfer started the 2010–11 NHL season playing in the AHL for the Providence Bruins, but in early December, he was promoted to the NHL, on an emergency basis, to fill in for the injured Mark Stuart. Kampfer made his NHL debut with the Bruins on December 9, 2010, in a 5–2 home win over the New York Islanders. His first NHL goal was scored on December 28 against the Tampa Bay Lightning. Kampfer recorded his first multi-point game on January 13, 2011, against the Philadelphia Flyers when he scored the game-winning goal with 1:14 remaining in the game to earn the first star honors for the night. Kampfer's high average ice time during his first 17 games as a Bruin, combined with the confidence shown by the coach in power play and key defensive situations, were intended to help make his case for a more permanent position on the roster, as when defenseman Mark Stuart was traded to the Atlanta Thrashers on February 18, 2011, center Rich Peverley was acquired in return, and Kampfer's continued presence with the Bruins proved valuable. His speed and ability to jump into the play, as recommended by the coaching staff, added a much-needed element to the Boston Bruins as of January 13, 2011.

Kampfer suffered a minor knee injury on April 9, 2011, while playing a game for the AHL's Providence Bruins. As a result, he was not able to rejoin the Boston team during the 2011 Stanley Cup Playoffs. Kampfer played in 38 games, three short of what is required to have his name engraved onto the Stanley Cup. Though the team petitioned the league to include Kampfer, injured center Marc Savard and defenseman Shane Hnidy on the cup, Savard's name was included, but Kampfer and Hnidy were not based on the 41-game qualification. Boston gave Kampfer a Stanley Cup ring and was given a day with the cup.

Kampfer missed the opening games of the 2011–12 NHL season due to a knee injury to the other leg suffered during training camp. He returned to the lineup playing alongside Andrew Ference in a 6–2 victory over the Toronto Maple Leafs on October 21, 2011. Kampfer saw spot duty for the Bruins that season, only appearing in ten games and none after January 31. At the 2012 NHL Trade Deadline on February 27, Kampfer was traded from the Bruins to the Minnesota Wild in exchange for defensemen Greg Zanon. He was initially assigned to Minnesota's AHL affiliate, the Houston Aeros, but was recalled in March. He scored his first goal for Minnesota in a 3–2 win over the Phoenix Coyotes on March 8, 2012. He appeared in 13 games with Minnesota, registering two goals and three points. The following year the NHL season was delayed due to the 2012–13 NHL lockout and Kampfer remained with Houston, suffering a knee injury. Once NHL play resumed, Kampfer suffered another injury, a concussion, that kept him out of the lineup. Kampfer re-signed with the Wild in the offseason to a one-year, two-way contract on June 28, 2013. Kampfer spent the majority of the 2013–14 season with Minnesota's new AHL affiliate, the Iowa Wild, playing in 69 games, scoring six goals and 26 points.

On July 1, 2014, Kampfer agreed to a one-year two-way contract with the New York Rangers. During training camp, Kampfer was competing with Matt Hunwick for the final defense spot on the roster. Hunwick won the position and Kampfer was to be loaned to the Rangers' AHL affiliate, the Hartford Wolf Pack. However, on October 6, 2014, Kampfer and Andrew Yogan were traded by the Rangers to the Florida Panthers in return for Joey Crabb in order to open a roster spot for Anthony Duclair. He spent the majority of the season with Florida's AHL affiliate, the San Antonio Rampage, setting a career high in goals in a season in the AHL with eight. He saw his first action with Florida on February 5, 2015 and even saw time playing as a forward. During the 2015–16 season, Kampfer played in 47 games with the Panthers, registering four points.

During the 2016–17 season, Kampfer was placed on waivers after one game with the Panthers. After clearing, Kampfer was subsequently dealt back to the Rangers on November 8, 2016, along with a conditional seventh-round pick in the 2018, in exchange for Dylan McIlrath. He was assigned to the Hartford Wolf Pack. Kampfer was recalled by the Rangers on February 28 after injuries to Kevin Klein and Dan Girardi. He played in his first game for the Rangers on February 28, 2017 versus the Washington Capitals. The same day, the Rangers acquired defenseman Brendan Smith from the Detroit Red Wings and Kampfer was returned to Hartford on March 1. He was recalled again on March 6. During the 2017–18 season, Kampfer played 26 games with the Rangers but his season ended on February 11, 2018 when his hand was broken by a shot from Dustin Byfuglien of the Winnipeg Jets.

On September 11, 2018, Kampfer, a 2019 fourth-round pick, and a conditional seventh-round pick were traded by the Rangers to the Boston Bruins in exchange for Adam McQuaid. He played 35 games with the Bruins during the 2018–19 season, scoring three goals and six points. On June 25, 2019 Kampfer signed a two-year contract extension with the Bruins. During the pandemic-disrupted 2019–20 season, Kampfer appeared in ten games for the Bruins, registering two points. However, Kampfer opted out of returning to the ice when the NHL resumed play during the season.

Following his 11th professional season, Kampfer left the NHL as a free agent and signed his first contract abroad in agreeing to a one-year deal with Russian-based Ak Bars Kazan of the Kontinental Hockey League (KHL) on July 5, 2021. Shouldering a greater responsibility and workload with Ak Bars in the 2021–22 season, Kampfer produced his highest points totals since 2014 in recording career-high 11 goals and 30 points through 46 regular season games.

As a free agent following Ak Bars playoff exit, Kampfer returned to North America and agreed to a one-year, two-way contract with the Detroit Red Wings on May 23, 2022. To begin the 2022–23 season, Kampfer was assigned to add a veteran presence to AHL affiliate, the Grand Rapids Griffins. He made 44 appearances on the blueline for the Griffins, posting 4 goals and 22 points before he was traded by the Red Wings to the Arizona Coyotes in exchange for future considerations on March 9, 2023. He was assigned to Arizona's AHL affiliate, the Tucson Roadrunners, to finish the season. On June 20, he signed a one-year, two-way contract with the Coyotes. Kampfer attended the Coyotes' 2023 training camp, but was assigned to Tucson to start the 2023–24 season. He was named the Roadrunners' new captain on October 21, 2023.

Following two seasons, Kampfer returned to Russia as a free agent, securing a one-year contract with Traktor Chelyabinsk on August 5, 2024. At the conclusion of his contract with Chelyabinsk, Kampfer opted to conclude his 15 year professional career announcing his retirement on May 24, 2025.

== International play ==
On January 13, 2022, Kampfer was named to the United States men's national team to compete at the 2022 Winter Olympics as an assistant captain.

== Career statistics ==
=== Regular season and playoffs ===
			Regular season					Playoffs
Season	Team	League	GP	G	A	Pts	PIM	GP	G	A	Pts	PIM
2004–05	Sioux City Musketeers	USHL	47	6	13	19	91	13	2	5	7	12
2005–06	Sioux City Musketeers	USHL	56	6	10	16	99	—	—	—	—	—
2006–07	University of Michigan	CCHA	35	1	3	4	24	—	—	—	—	—
2007–08	University of Michigan	CCHA	42	2	15	17	36	—	—	—	—	—
2008–09	University of Michigan	CCHA	25	1	12	13	24	—	—	—	—	—
2009–10	University of Michigan	CCHA	45	3	23	26	50	—	—	—	—	—
2009–10	Providence Bruins	AHL	6	1	2	3	4	—	—	—	—	—
2010–11	Providence Bruins	AHL	22	3	13	16	12	—	—	—	—	—
2010–11	Boston Bruins	NHL	38	5	5	10	12	—	—	—	—	—
2011–12	Boston Bruins	NHL	10	0	2	2	4	—	—	—	—	—
2011–12	Providence Bruins	AHL	12	1	3	4	8	—	—	—	—	—
2011–12	Minnesota Wild	NHL	13	2	1	3	2	—	—	—	—	—
2011–12	Houston Aeros	AHL	—	—	—	—	—	4	0	0	0	2
2012–13	Houston Aeros	AHL	55	4	17	21	28	5	1	1	2	9
2013–14	Iowa Wild	AHL	69	6	20	26	48	—	—	—	—	—
2014–15	San Antonio Rampage	AHL	42	8	11	19	49	—	—	—	—	—
2014–15	Florida Panthers	NHL	25	2	2	4	12	—	—	—	—	—
2015–16	Florida Panthers	NHL	47	0	4	4	26	—	—	—	—	—
2016–17	Hartford Wolf Pack	AHL	43	4	15	19	44	—	—	—	—	—
2016–17	New York Rangers	NHL	10	1	1	2	2	—	—	—	—	—
2017–18	New York Rangers	NHL	22	0	1	1	20	—	—	—	—	—
2018–19	Boston Bruins	NHL	35	3	3	6	22	3	1	0	1	0
2018–19	Providence Bruins	AHL	3	1	1	2	2	—	—	—	—	—
2019–20	Boston Bruins	NHL	10	0	2	2	2	—	—	—	—	—
2019–20	Providence Bruins	AHL	22	3	6	9	16	—	—	—	—	—
2020–21	Boston Bruins	NHL	20	2	3	5	4	—	—	—	—	—
2021–22	Ak Bars Kazan	KHL	46	11	19	30	49	6	2	2	4	2
2022–23	Grand Rapids Griffins	AHL	44	4	18	22	26	—	—	—	—	—
2022–23	Tucson Roadrunners	AHL	15	2	5	7	12	3	0	1	1	0
2023–24	Tucson Roadrunners	AHL	45	3	19	22	33	2	0	1	1	0
2024–25	Traktor Chelyabinsk	KHL	59	10	22	32	23	20	4	6	10	4
NHL totals			231	15	24	39	110	3	1	0	1	0
KHL totals			105	21	41	62	72	26	6	8	14	6

=== International ===
Year	Team	Event	Result	GP	G	A	Pts	PIM
2022	United States	OG	5th	4	1	3	4	2
Senior totals				4	1	3	4	2

== Awards and honors ==
Award	Year
College
CCHA All-Tournament Team	2009, 2010
