= Adam McQuaid =

Canadian ice hockey player (born 1986)

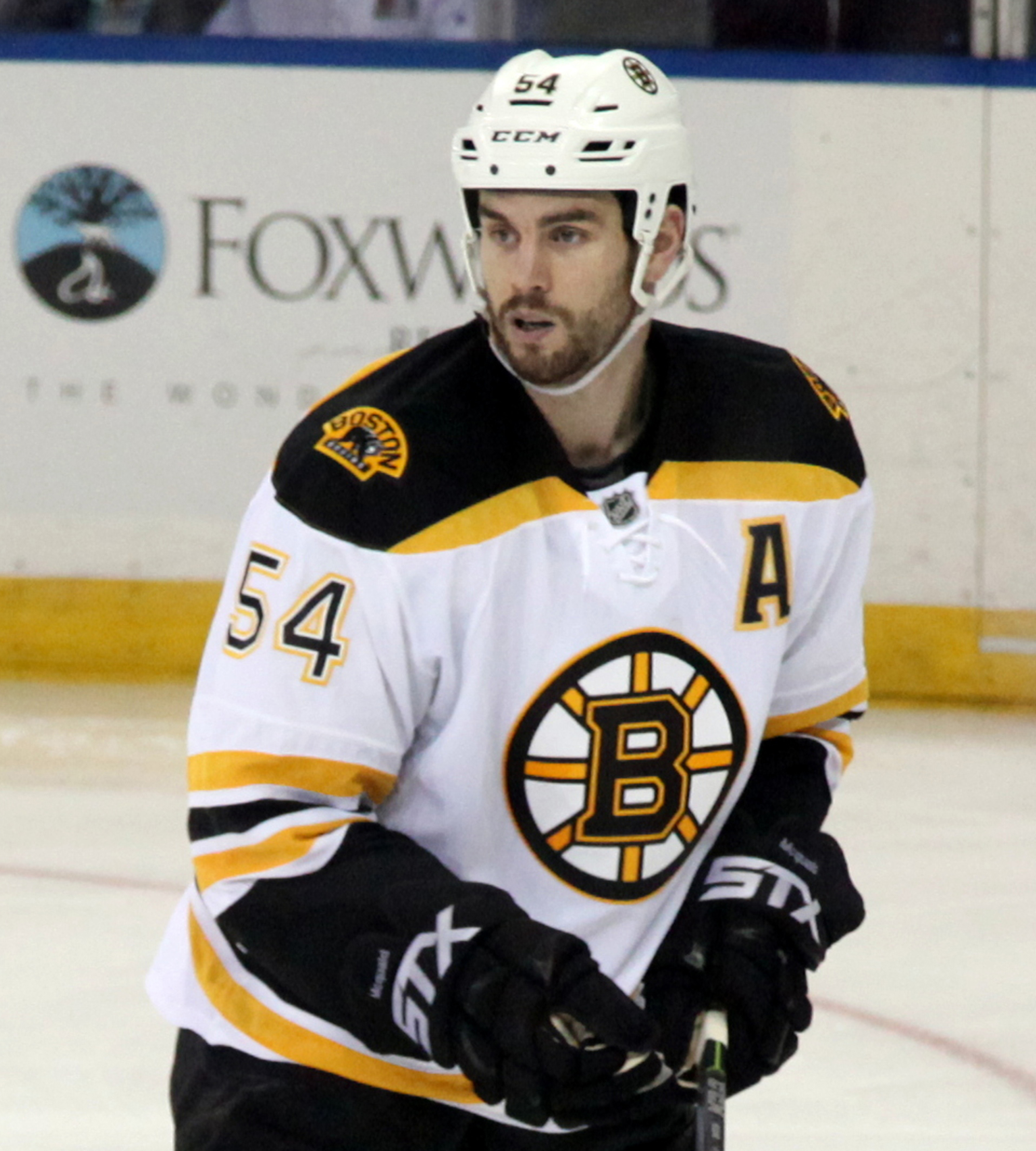
- McQuaid with the Boston Bruins in September 2015
- Born: October 12, 1986 (age 40) Charlottetown, Prince Edward Island, Canada
- Height: 6 ft 5 in (196 cm)
- Weight: 209 lb (95 kg; 14 st 13 lb)
- Position: Defence
- Shot: Right
- Played for: Boston Bruins; New York Rangers; Columbus Blue Jackets
- NHL draft: 55th overall, 2005; Columbus Blue Jackets
- Playing career: 2007–2019

Adam McQuaid (born October 12, 1986) is a Canadian former professional ice hockey defenceman. He formerly played in the National Hockey League (NHL) with the Boston Bruins, New York Rangers and Columbus Blue Jackets. McQuaid was known primarily as an enforcer for his physical play and capability as a fighter, often protecting younger or smaller members of the team. He won the Stanley Cup in 2011 with the Bruins.

== Playing career ==
=== Amateur ===
McQuaid played major midget hockey in his hometown of Cornwall, Prince Edward Island, for the Cornwall Thunder before playing major junior hockey with the Sudbury Wolves of the Ontario Hockey League (OHL) for four seasons. McQuaid was selected in the second round, 43rd overall, in the 2003 OHL Priority Selection as a 17-year-old overage player. He was undrafted by the OHL the previous season.

After scoring 19 points in his second season with the Wolves in 2004–05, McQuaid returned to the OHL and, in his final season, helped lead the Wolves to the OHL Final against the Plymouth Whalers; the Wolves were defeated in six games.

=== Professional ===
McQuaid was selected in the second round, 55th overall, by the Columbus Blue Jackets in the 2005 NHL entry draft. He returned to the OHL and did not play a game with Columbus before he was traded to the Boston Bruins in exchange for a fifth-round draft pick in the off-season. He was immediately signed by Boston to a three-year, entry-level contract.

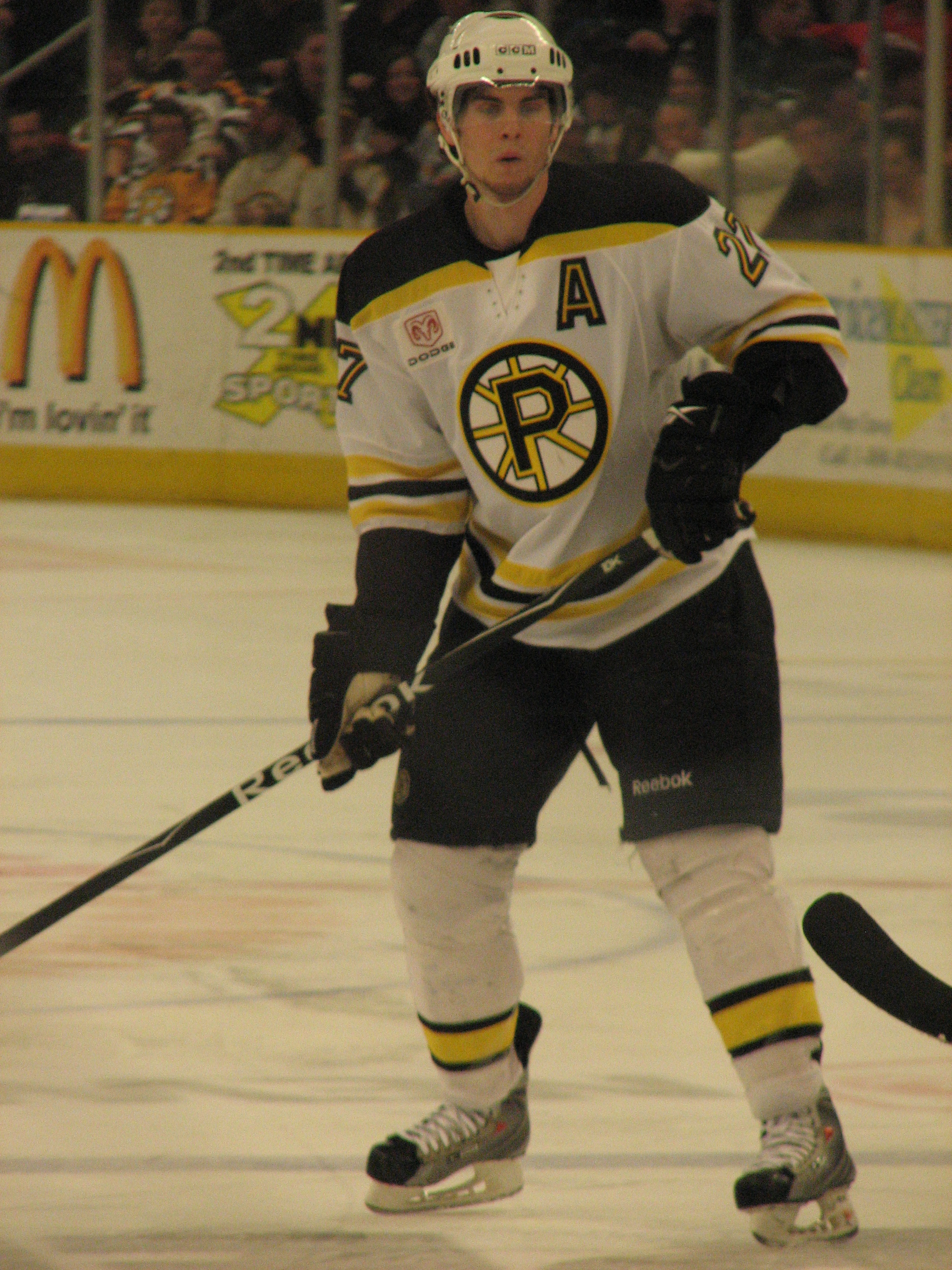
McQuaid with the Providence Bruins in February 2009

He was assigned to Boston's American Hockey League (AHL) affiliate, the Providence Bruins in 2007–08 and scored nine points in his professional rookie season.

He scored his first NHL goal on February 7, 2010, a game-winner against goaltender Jaroslav Halák in a 3–0 win against the Montreal Canadiens at the Bell Centre. During the NHL's Olympic Break, McQuaid suffered a freak concussion after tripping over his suitcase.

During game four of the 2011 Stanley Cup Final, analyst Pierre McGuire described him as "one tough hombre." In game seven, a week later, McQuaid won his first Stanley Cup as the Bruins won a 4–0 shutout the Presidents' Trophy-winning Vancouver Canucks.

On July 14, 2011, McQuaid signed a three-year, $4.7 million contract with Boston.

In the 2012–13 season, McQuaid helped the Bruins to the Stanley Cup Final by scoring the game-winning goal against the Pittsburgh Penguins in game four of the Eastern Conference Final. He and the Bruins would end up losing in the Final to the Chicago Blackhawks in six games.

In the 2013–14 season, McQuaid would miss most of the season with an illness.

On June 26, 2015, McQuaid signed a four-year, $11 million contract extension with the Bruins. In a game against the Washington Capitals on January 5, 2016, Capitals forward Zach Sill boarded McQuaid and was suspended two games.

On October 19, 2017, McQuaid was placed on injured reserve after breaking his right fibula in a game against the Vancouver Canucks.

Having played in nine straight seasons with the Bruins and approaching the 2018–19 season, McQuaid was traded to the New York Rangers in exchange for Steven Kampfer, a 2019 fourth-round pick and a conditional seventh-round pick on September 11, 2018. McQuaid added a physical presence on the blueline of the rebuilding Rangers, and recorded 2 goals and 5 points through 36 games. With the Rangers out of playoff contention, and in his final year under contract, McQuaid was traded by the Rangers at the trade deadline to his original draft club, the Columbus Blue Jackets, in exchange for Julius Bergman, and a fourth and seventh round picks in 2019 on February 25, 2019. On March 15, 2019 McQuaid scored his first goal as a Blue Jacket, the game-winning goal as they shut out the Carolina Hurricanes, 3–0 in Columbus.

On January 16, 2021, McQuaid officially announced his retirement from professional hockey after 12 seasons.

In August 2021 McQuaid rejoined the Boston Bruins organization as the team's new player development coordinator.

== Personal life ==
McQuaid is a Christian. McQuaid helped to start a Bible study group when he was with the Boston Bruins.

McQuaid married his girlfriend Stephanie Enserink in 2018. His sister, Michelle McQuaid, competed at the 2015, 2017, 2018 and 2019 Scotties Tournament of Hearts representing Prince Edward Island. His brother Chad McQuaid is currently a practicing lawyer in Charlottetown, PEI.

== Career statistics ==
			Regular season					Playoffs
Season	Team	League	GP	G	A	Pts	PIM	GP	G	A	Pts	PIM
2002–03	Cornwall Thunder AAA	Midget	21	4	5	9	44	—	—	—	—	—
2003–04	Sudbury Wolves	OHL	47	3	6	9	25	7	0	1	1	2
2004–05	Sudbury Wolves	OHL	66	3	16	19	98	8	0	2	2	10
2005–06	Sudbury Wolves	OHL	68	3	14	17	107	10	0	1	1	16
2006–07	Sudbury Wolves	OHL	65	9	22	31	110	21	1	5	6	24
2007–08	Providence Bruins	AHL	68	1	8	9	73	10	0	0	0	9
2008–09	Providence Bruins	AHL	78	4	11	15	141	16	0	3	3	26
2009–10	Providence Bruins	AHL	32	3	7	10	66	—	—	—	—	—
2009–10	Boston Bruins	NHL	19	1	0	1	21	9	0	0	0	6
2010–11	Boston Bruins	NHL	67	3	12	15	96	23	0	4	4	14
2011–12	Boston Bruins	NHL	72	2	8	10	99	—	—	—	—	—
2012–13	Boston Bruins	NHL	32	1	3	4	60	22	2	2	4	10
2013–14	Boston Bruins	NHL	30	1	5	6	69	—	—	—	—	—
2014–15	Boston Bruins	NHL	63	1	6	7	85	—	—	—	—	—
2015–16	Boston Bruins	NHL	64	1	8	9	89	—	—	—	—	—
2016–17	Boston Bruins	NHL	77	2	8	10	71	2	0	1	1	0
2017–18	Boston Bruins	NHL	38	1	3	4	62	—	—	—	—	—
2018–19	New York Rangers	NHL	36	2	3	5	33	—	—	—	—	—
2018–19	Columbus Blue Jackets	NHL	14	1	1	2	9	—	—	—	—	—
NHL totals			512	16	57	73	694	68	2	7	9	30
