= Shawn Thornton =

Canadian ice hockey player (born 1977)

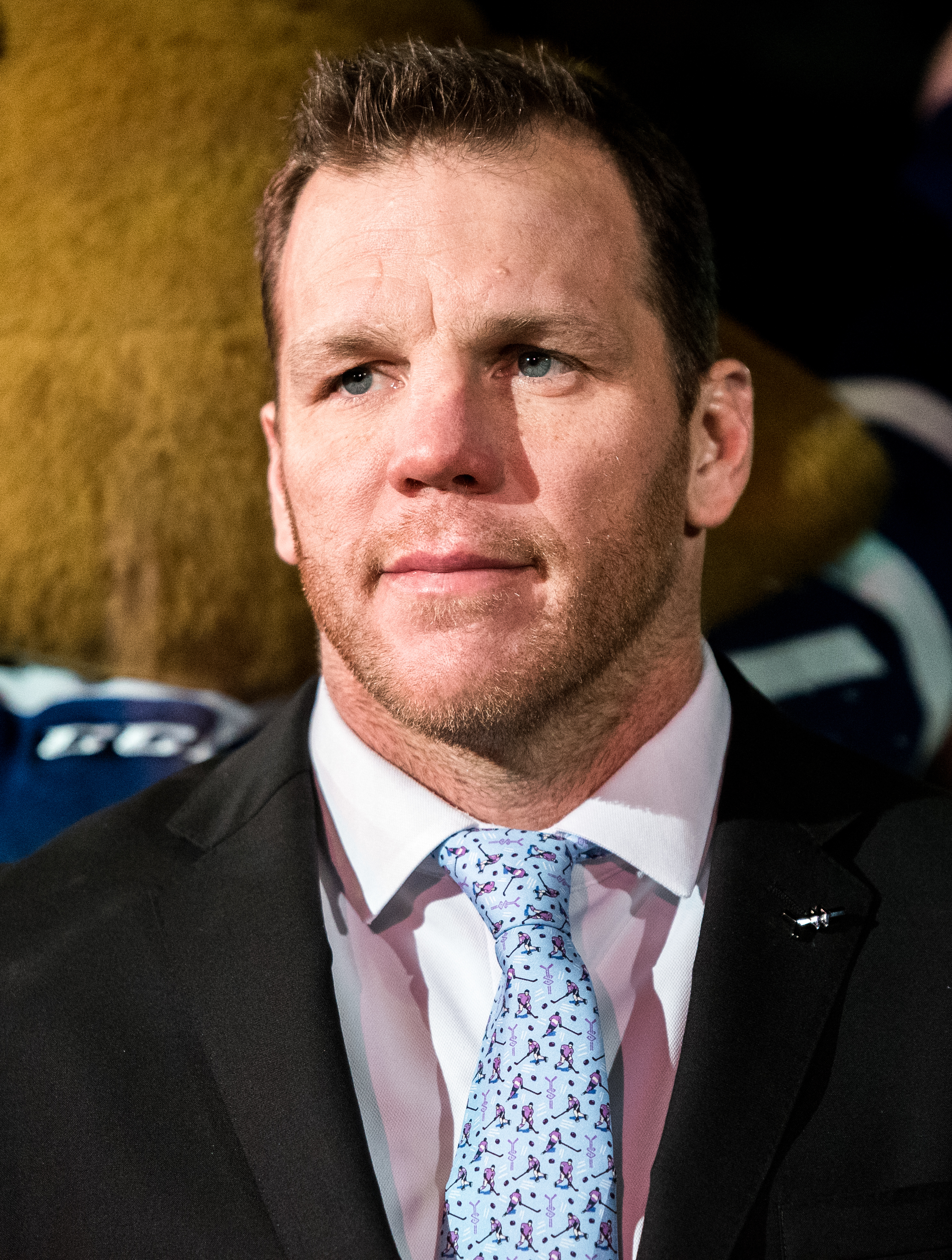
- Thornton in January 2019
- Born: July 23, 1977 (age 49) Oshawa, Ontario, Canada
- Height: 6 ft 2 in (188 cm)
- Weight: 217 lb (98 kg; 15 st 7 lb)
- Position: Winger
- Shot: Right
- Played for: Chicago Blackhawks; Anaheim Ducks; Boston Bruins; Florida Panthers
- NHL draft: 190th overall, 1997; Toronto Maple Leafs
- Playing career: 1997–2017

Shawn Thornton (born July 23, 1977) is a Canadian former professional ice hockey player of the National Hockey League (NHL). An enforcer throughout his career, he won two Stanley Cups with the Anaheim Ducks in 2007 and the Boston Bruins in 2011. After retiring, he won two more Stanley Cups as an executive with the Florida Panthers in 2024 and 2025.

== Playing career ==
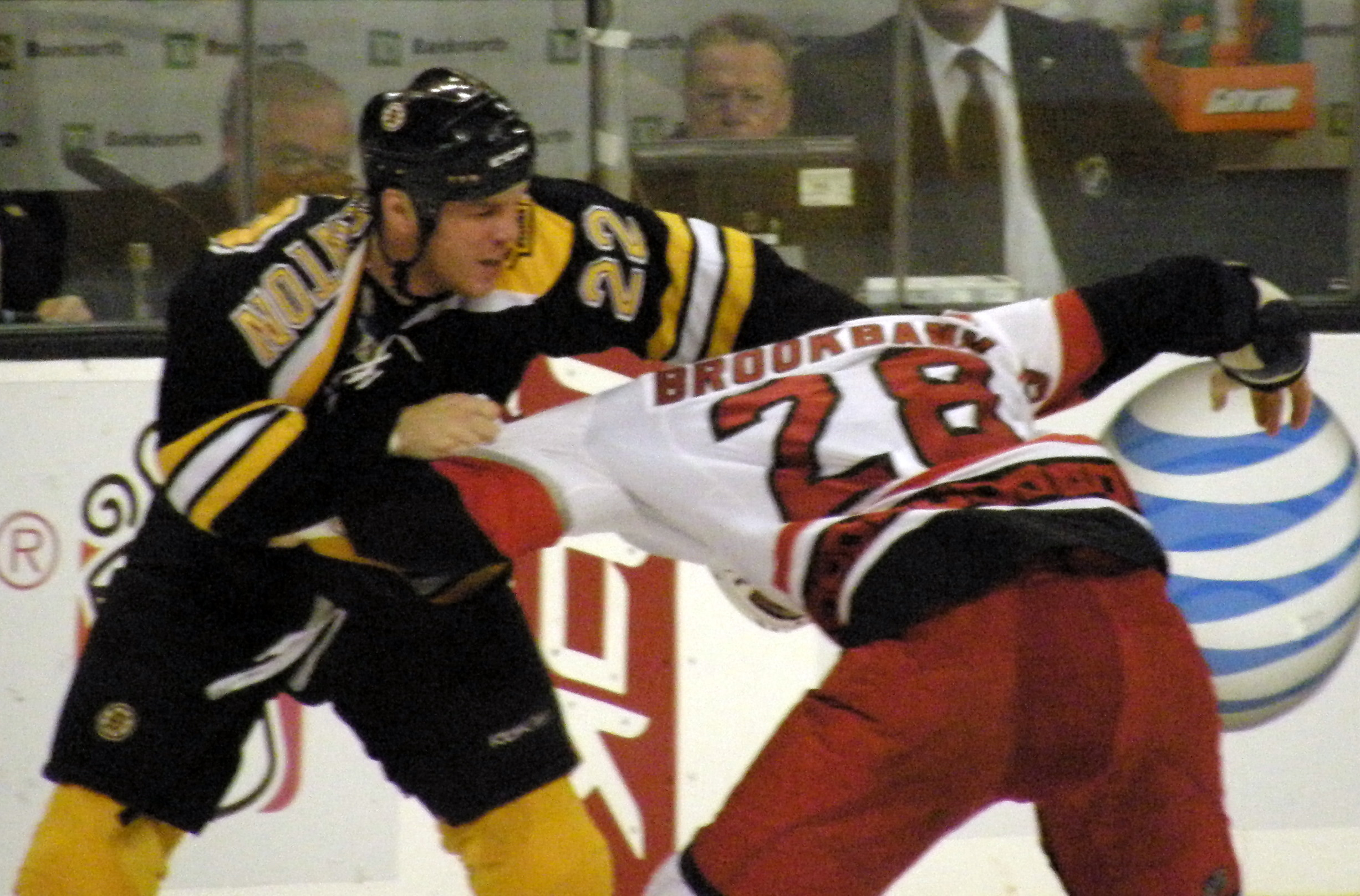
Thornton in a fight with Wade Brookbank in January 2008

=== Amateur ===
Thornton played minor hockey for his hometown Oshawa Minor Generals of the OMHA's Eastern AAA League. He was drafted in the 9th round (145th overall) by the Peterborough Petes in the 1995 OHL Priority Selection.

=== Professional ===
==== Chicago Blackhawks/Anaheim Ducks ====
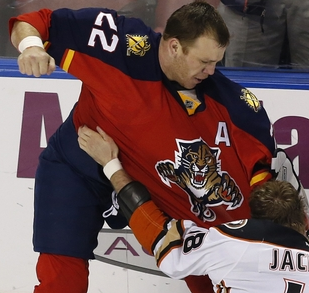
Thornton in February 2015 with the Florida Panthers

Thornton attempted to be drafted in the 1996 NHL draft but was not selected by any team. He was then drafted into the NHL by the Toronto Maple Leafs in 1997, 190th overall, Thornton never played for Toronto and was traded to the Chicago Blackhawks during the 2001–02 season. After six seasons back and forth between the NHL and AHL between the Chicago and Anaheim Ducks franchises, Thornton won his first career Stanley Cup in his final season with the Ducks in 2006–07.

==== Boston Bruins ====
On July 1, 2007, Thornton signed a three-year, 1.5 million dollar, deal with the Boston Bruins. During a seven-year tenure in Boston, Thornton won his second career Stanley Cup during the 2010–11 season in which he also tallied career high numbers in goals (10), assists (10), points (20) and +/– (8).

==== Florida Panthers ====
At the end of the 2013–14 season, the Bruins organization informed Thornton that they would not be re-signing him, ending his career in Boston. That summer, he signed a two-year contract with the Florida Panthers. At the end of his contract, he re-signed with Florida for one year.

On April 6, 2017, Thornton announced that he would be retiring at the end of the season and played his final game on April 8. During the announcement of his retirement, he revealed that he would be joining the Panthers' front office in a business related position after the conclusion of his playing career.

=== Brooks Orpik incident ===
On December 7, 2013, Thornton tried to goad Pittsburgh Penguins defenseman Brooks Orpik into fighting after Orpik delivered a borderline hit on Boston’s Loui Eriksson early in the first period. Orpik rebuffed Thornton’s invitation and at 11:06 of the first period, after a whistle due to Penguins winger James Neal kneeing Bruins winger Brad Marchand in the head, Thornton approached a thicket of players from both teams, slew-footed Orpik from behind and, while Orpik was on the ice, punched him at least twice. Six days later, he received his suspension after an in-person hearing with the league’s department of player safety. He appealed the suspension and had a hearing that Friday with NHL commissioner Gary Bettman, who did not immediately announce a decision. On December 14, 2013, Thornton was suspended for fifteen games. Thornton, who was emotional after the game, contacted Orpik directly to apologize. Orpik conveyed forgiveness and understanding. Thornton and Orpik, who are friends, were part of a group of players who had worked out together in the offseason and during the NHL lockout.

== Executive career ==
After Thornton retired, he was named vice president of business operations for the Panthers. In April 2018, he would become Senior Vice President of the Panthers. Thornton would serve various roles in the Panthers organization for eight years, including as Chief Revenue Officer, and was part of the organization for their first two Stanley Cup victories, in 2024 and 2025, as well as a run to the Finals in 2023.

After the 2024–25 season, Thornton announced he was leaving the Panthers organization, and would join the NBA's Atlanta Hawks as the Senior Vice President and Chief Partnership Officer.

== Personal life ==
Thornton founded the Thornton Foundation in 2013, which among other things, funds research into finding cures for Parkinson's disease and cancer.

Thornton is a cousin of professional lacrosse players Zack and Bill Greer. Zack plays for the San Diego Seals of the National Lacrosse League (NLL), while Bill has retired and works for the Seals as an assistant coach. Thornton is also the cousin of footballer Chris Brunt, who represented the Northern Ireland national team and most recently played for Bristol City F.C. of the EFL Championship.

Thornton was a part-owner of a restaurant in Pembroke, Massachusetts named Turner's Yard, which closed in 2014. Former Boston Red Sox pitcher Tim Wakefield was also a member of the owner's group.

Thornton made a cameo in the 2012 film Ted as an audience member at a Norah Jones concert. Thornton also featured on season 3 of Kitchen Nightmares in 2011.

Thornton's autobiography Shawn Thornton: Fighting My Way to the Top was released in November 2021.

== Career statistics ==
			Regular season					Playoffs
Season	Team	League	GP	G	A	Pts	PIM	GP	G	A	Pts	PIM
1994–95	Oshawa Kiwanis AAA	OMHA	43	8	19	28	113	—	—	—	—	—
1995–96	Peterborough Petes	OHL	63	4	10	14	192	24	3	0	3	25
1996–97	Peterborough Petes	OHL	61	19	10	29	204	11	2	4	6	20
1997–98	St. John's Maple Leafs	AHL	59	0	3	3	225	—	—	—	—	—
1998–99	St. John's Maple Leafs	AHL	78	8	11	19	354	5	0	0	0	9
1999–00	St. John's Maple Leafs	AHL	60	4	12	16	316	—	—	—	—	—
2000–01	St. John's Maple Leafs	AHL	79	5	12	17	320	3	1	2	3	2
2001–02	Norfolk Admirals	AHL	70	8	14	22	281	4	0	0	0	4
2002–03	Norfolk Admirals	AHL	50	11	2	13	213	9	0	2	2	28
2002–03	Chicago Blackhawks	NHL	13	1	1	2	31	—	—	—	—	—
2003–04	Norfolk Admirals	AHL	64	6	11	17	259	8	1	1	2	6
2003–04	Chicago Blackhawks	NHL	8	1	0	1	23	—	—	—	—	—
2004–05	Norfolk Admirals	AHL	71	5	9	14	263	6	0	0	0	8
2005–06	Norfolk Admirals	AHL	59	10	22	32	192	4	0	0	0	35
2005–06	Chicago Blackhawks	NHL	10	0	0	0	16	—	—	—	—	—
2006–07	Portland Pirates	AHL	15	4	4	8	55	—	—	—	—	—
2006–07	Anaheim Ducks	NHL	48	2	7	9	88	15	0	0	0	19
2007–08	Boston Bruins	NHL	58	4	3	7	74	7	0	0	0	6
2008–09	Boston Bruins	NHL	79	6	5	11	123	10	1	0	1	6
2009–10	Boston Bruins	NHL	74	1	9	10	141	12	0	0	0	4
2010–11	Boston Bruins	NHL	79	10	10	20	122	18	0	1	1	24
2011–12	Boston Bruins	NHL	81	5	8	13	154	5	0	0	0	0
2012–13	Boston Bruins	NHL	45	3	4	7	60	22	0	4	4	18
2013–14	Boston Bruins	NHL	64	5	3	8	74	12	0	1	1	4
2014–15	Florida Panthers	NHL	46	1	4	5	50	—	—	—	—	—
2015–16	Florida Panthers	NHL	50	1	4	5	80	4	0	0	0	2
2016–17	Florida Panthers	NHL	50	2	2	4	67	—	—	—	—	—
NHL totals			705	42	60	102	1103	105	1	6	7	83
AHL totals			605	61	100	161	2478	39	2	6	8	92

== Awards and honours ==
Award	Year
NHL
Stanley Cup champion	2007, 2011, 2024 (as executive), 2025 (as executive)
Boston Bruins
Eddie Shore Award	2011

In 2023 he would be named one of the top 100 Bruins players of all time.
