= Rene Rancourt =

American singer

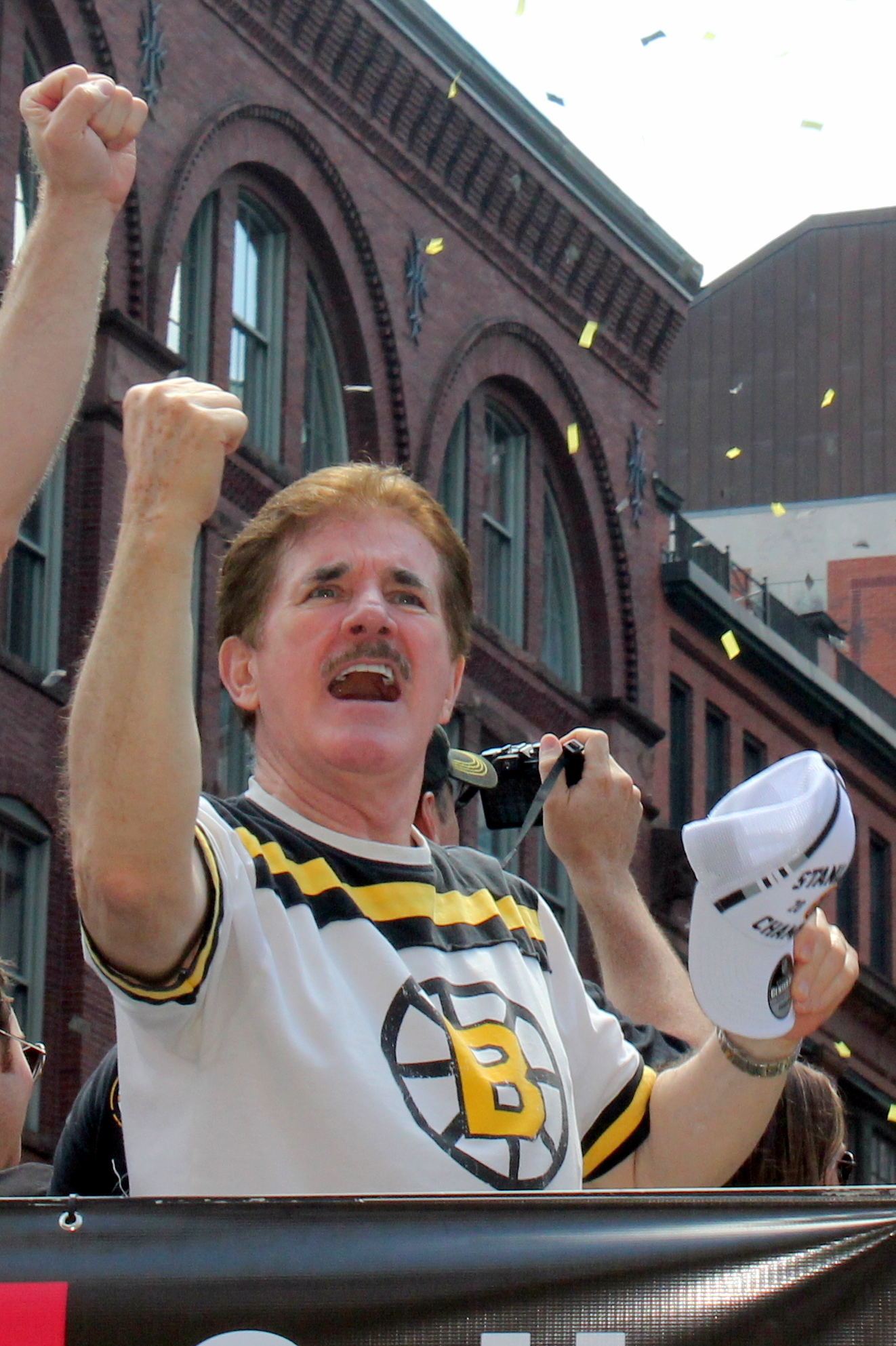
- Rancourt participating in the Bruins 2011 Stanley Cup Finals victory parade

Background information
- Born: August 4, 1939 (age 86); Lewiston, Maine, U.S.
- Occupation: Singer

Rene Rancourt (born August 4, 1939) is an American singer who is best known for having performed the national anthem at home games of the National Hockey League's Boston Bruins for 42 years. Rancourt's final combined performance of both "The Star-Spangled Banner" and "O Canada" took place before Game 7 of the Bruins' Eastern Conference first round playoff series against the Toronto Maple Leafs on April 25, 2018. His final anthem performance, of "the Star-Spangled Banner" alone, took place on May 4, 2018, as Boston hosted Game 4 of the Eastern Conference second round series against the Tampa Bay Lightning.

== Early life ==
Rancourt was born in Lewiston, Maine, the son of Léon Rancourt and Bernadette Guénette, French Canadians from Quebec.

== Career ==
Rancourt first began singing the anthem in Boston at Fenway Park. He took part in an opera singing audition on the radio and was heard by John Kiley, long-time organist at both Fenway and the Boston Garden. Rancourt sang before Game 6 of the 1975 World Series when singer Kate Smith cancelled her appearance. Rancourt's original ambition had been to become an opera singer, and the strength of his trained voice overcame the acoustic shortcomings of the old Garden. In 1976, he began singing regularly for Boston Bruins games.

Rancourt's signature fist-pump at the end of the anthem was modeled after the "Stump Pump" of former Bruin Randy Burridge, whom Rancourt admired. Rancourt also saluted at the end of the anthem, for men and women who have served in the armed forces, although it was initially inspired by an elderly fan of Rancourt. Rancourt performed the anthems before Bruins games, as well as singing at auto races, charity events and nursing homes in and around New England. He did not have a contract with the Bruins, and said, "I've never had a contract; I've always just shown up and I've become associated with the Bruins."

Rancourt served in the U.S. Army in the 1960s, in which after winning a singing contest he was assigned to a GI traveling show which kept him from being sent to Vietnam.

On January 17, 2018, the Bruins announced that Rancourt would retire at the end of the 2017–18 season. He was honored during the Bruins' last regular-season game against the Florida Panthers on April 8. His final playoff game was Game 4 of the Eastern Conference second round series against the Tampa Bay Lightning on May 4, 2018. Rancourt retired after the Lightning eliminated the Bruins in five games.

== Post Bruins ==
Rancourt says he will still be singing at weddings and parties, and spending more time with his wife.

== Other sources ==
- O'Leary Murray, Alison (December 2, 2004). "Bruins Singer Misses His Gig". Boston Globe.
- Keefe, Bill (October 2006). "Bruins national anthem singer Rene Rancourt". Boston Sports Review.
