= Daniel Paille =

Canadian ice hockey player (born 1984)

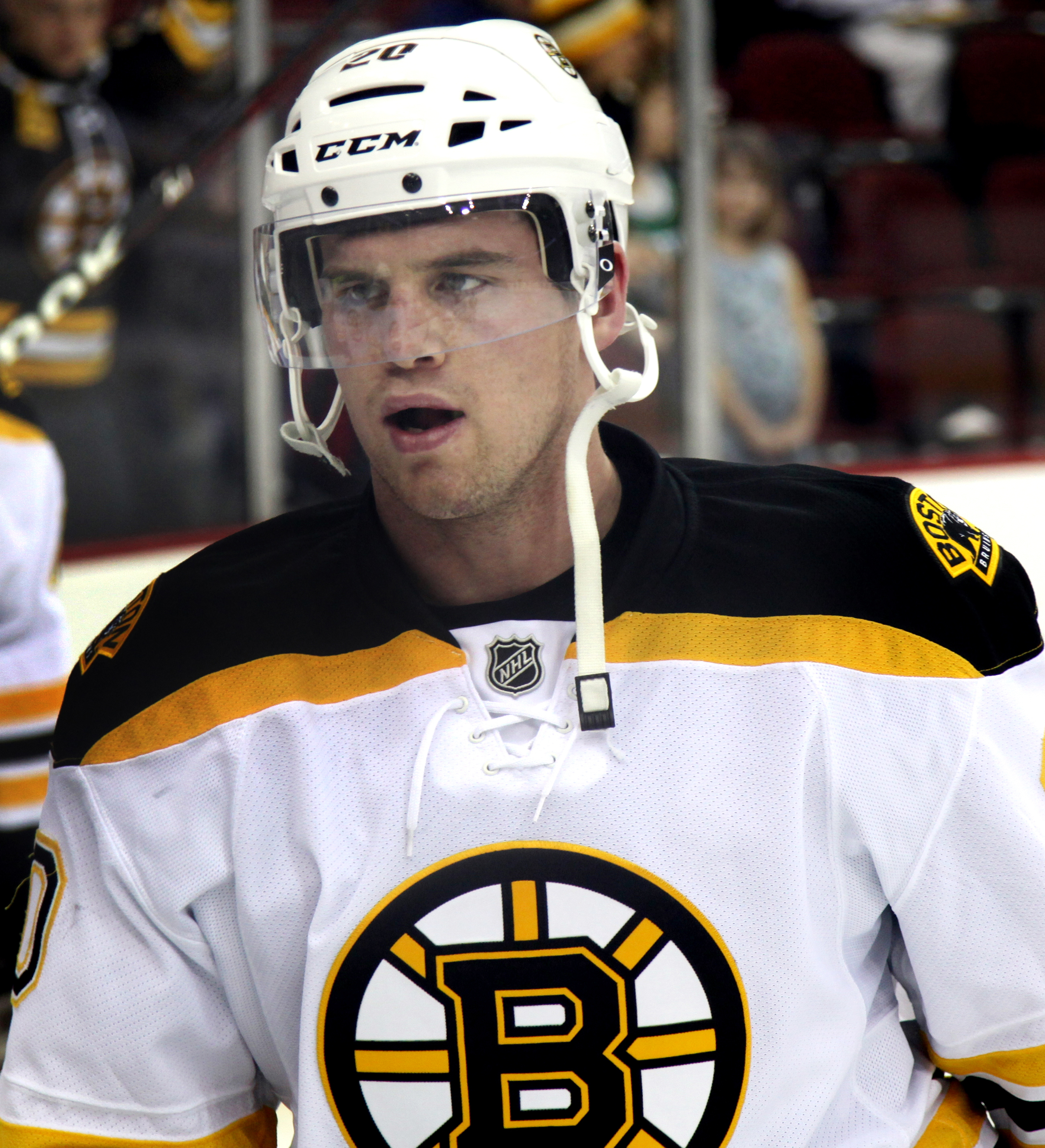
- Paille with the Boston Bruins in 2012
- Born: April 15, 1984 (age 42) Welland, Ontario, Canada
- Height: 6 ft 0 in (183 cm)
- Weight: 200 lb (91 kg; 14 st 4 lb)
- Position: Left wing
- Shot: Left
- Played for: Buffalo Sabres; Boston Bruins; Ilves Tampere; New York Rangers; Brynäs IF
- NHL draft: 20th overall, 2002; Buffalo Sabres
- Playing career: 2004–2017 Coaching career

Coaching career (HC unless noted)
- 2019–2024: Canisius (assistant)
- 2024–Present: Niagara Ice Dogs (assistant)

Daniel Joseph Paille (born April 15, 1984) is a Canadian former professional ice hockey left winger. He was originally drafted 20th overall by the Buffalo Sabres in the 2002 NHL entry draft and also played in the National Hockey League with the Boston Bruins and New York Rangers.

== Playing career ==
=== Junior ===
Paille played junior hockey for the Ontario Hockey League (OHL)'s Guelph Storm. He was also a member of Team Canada for the 2003 World Junior Ice Hockey Championships and served as Canada's captain for the same tournament in 2004, winning silver medals in both.

=== Professional ===
==== Buffalo Sabres ====
Paille scored his first career NHL goal on January 14, 2006, against the Los Angeles Kings. In the summer of 2007, he signed a one-year, $535,000 one-way contract to remain in Buffalo, then again re-signed with the Sabres the next summer, on July 16, 2008, on a two-year, $2.2 million contract that paid $900,000 in his first year and $1.3 million in his second.

==== Boston Bruins ====
On October 20, 2009, Paille was traded to the Boston Bruins in exchange for a third-round and a conditional fourth-round draft pick. His move to Boston marked the first-ever trade of a player under contract between the two division rivals in their common 39 years in the NHL.

Paille won the Stanley Cup with the Bruins on June 15, 2011, over the Vancouver Canucks in a 4–0 game seven victory. He was a major contributor on the penalty kill, as he and linemate Gregory Campbell were instrumental in holding the high-powered Vancouver power play unit to just two goals scored in the seven-game Final series.

After completing his third season with Boston in 2011–12, Paille was re-signed by the Bruins to a three-year contract on June 1, 2012.

Paille signed with Ilves in Finland on December 2, 2012, during the 2012–13 NHL lockout; he rejoined the Bruins when play resumed in mid-January 2013. On June 15, during the 2013 playoffs, Paille scored the game-winning goal in overtime of game two of the Final on Corey Crawford, giving the Bruins a 2–1 victory over the Chicago Blackhawks. Two days later, on June 17, he scored the first goal in game three of the Finals, which turned out to be the game-winner in the Bruins' 2–0 win over Chicago. Despite taking a 2–1 series lead, the Bruins would ultimately lose the series to the Presidents' Trophy-winning Blackhawks, 4–2.

On April 13, 2015, the Bruins, after missing the playoffs for the first time in nine years, informed Paille that they would not be offering him a contract extension, which made him an unrestricted free agent on July 1, 2015.

==== Rockford IceHogs/New York Rangers ====
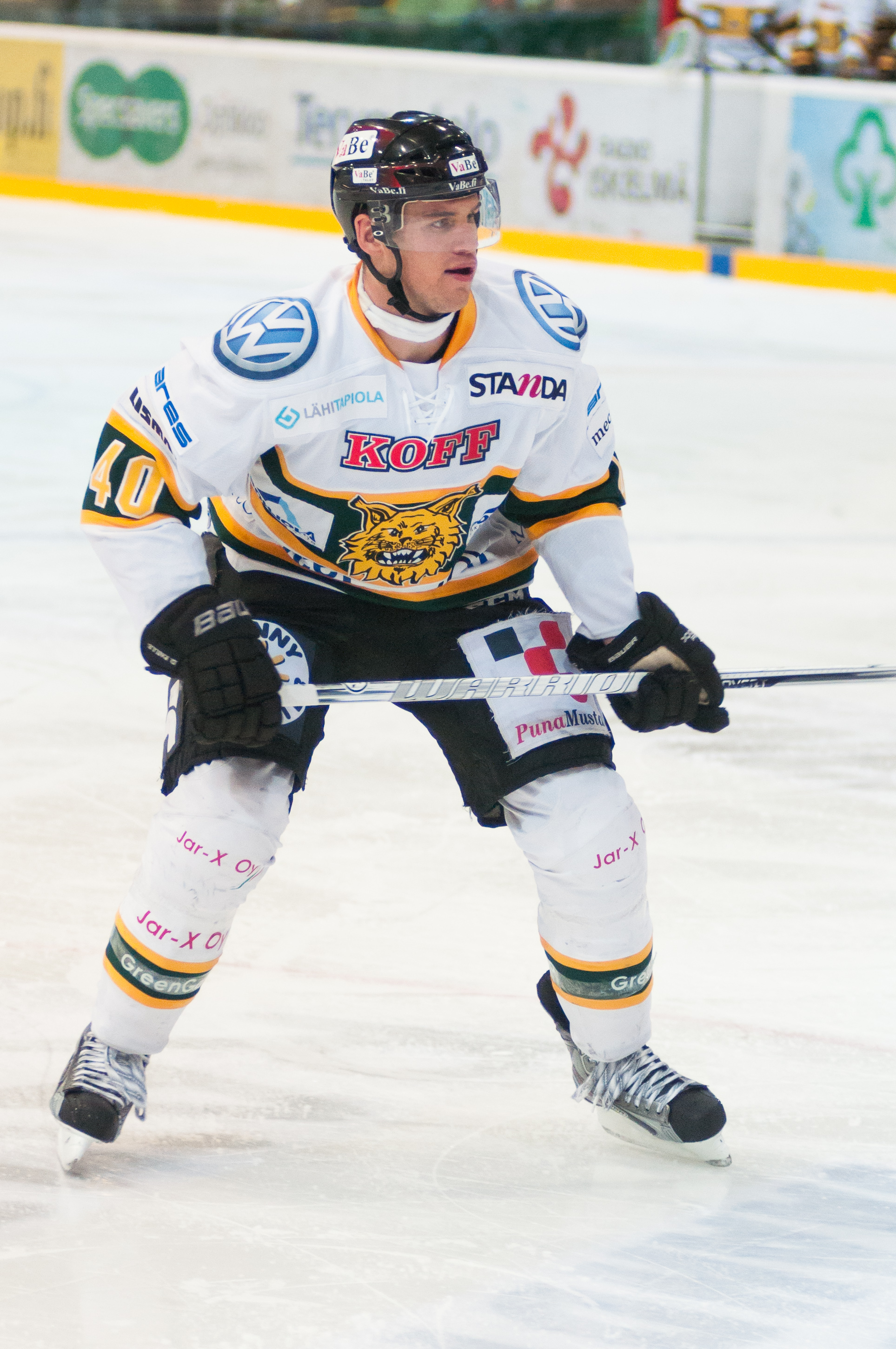
Paille playing for Ilves during the 2012–13 NHL lockout.

On September 13, 2015, the Chicago Blackhawks invited Paille to attend their training camp on a Professional Tryout agreement. He was subsequently released by the Blackhawks on September 28. The following day Paille signed a professional tryout with the Rockford IceHogs, Chicago's American Hockey League affiliate. Paille appeared in 31 games with the IceHogs, before he was signed to one-year contract for the remainder of the season to add depth to the New York Rangers on January 21, 2016. On April 20, 2016, Paille was recalled by the New York Rangers from the team's AHL affiliate, the Hartford Wolf Pack.

==== Brynäs IF ====
At season's end, Paille opted to continue his career abroad, agreeing to a one-year contract in Sweden with Brynäs IF of the SHL on May 19, 2016.

During his second season with Brynäs in 2017–18, Paille posted 5 points in 14 appearances to begin the campaign before his career was effectively ended through injury, after receiving a blindside hit from Thomas Larkin in a Champions Hockey League game against German club, Adler Mannheim, on November 8, 2017. After suffering three earlier concussions from his tenure in the NHL, Paille was ruled out from the remainder of the season and returned to North America.

== Personal life ==
Paille was raised in Welland, Ontario. He attended Saint François Elementary School and École Secondaire Confédération. Paille played his minor hockey with his hometown Welland Tigers of the Ontario Minor Hockey Association (OMHA)'s South Central AAA league. His teammates growing up in Welland included several future NHLers, including Nathan Horton, Daniel Girardi, Andre Deveaux and Matt Ellis. He admired Steve Yzerman when he was growing up. In 2009, Paille married his longtime girlfriend, Dana Goretsas.

== Career statistics ==
=== Regular season and playoffs ===
			Regular season					Playoffs
Season	Team	League	GP	G	A	Pts	PIM	GP	G	A	Pts	PIM
1998–99	Welland Tigers AAA	SCT U15	52	42	41	83	40	—	—	—	—	—
1999–2000	Welland Cougars	GHL	42	14	17	37	19	16	16	16	32	—
2000–01	Guelph Storm	OHL	64	22	31	53	57	4	2	0	2	2
2001–02	Guelph Storm	OHL	62	27	30	57	53	9	5	2	7	9
2002–03	Guelph Storm	OHL	54	30	27	57	28	11	8	6	14	6
2003–04	Guelph Storm	OHL	59	37	43	80	63	22	9	9	18	14
2004–05	Rochester Americans	AHL	79	14	15	29	54	9	2	2	4	6
2005–06	Rochester Americans	AHL	45	14	13	27	29	—	—	—	—	—
2005–06	Buffalo Sabres	NHL	14	1	2	3	2	—	—	—	—	—
2006–07	Rochester Americans	AHL	29	7	14	21	12	—	—	—	—	—
2006–07	Buffalo Sabres	NHL	29	3	8	11	18	1	0	0	0	0
2007–08	Buffalo Sabres	NHL	77	19	16	35	14	—	—	—	—	—
2008–09	Buffalo Sabres	NHL	73	12	15	27	20	—	—	—	—	—
2009–10	Buffalo Sabres	NHL	2	0	1	1	0	—	—	—	—	—
2009–10	Boston Bruins	NHL	74	10	9	19	12	13	0	2	2	2
2010–11	Boston Bruins	NHL	43	6	7	13	28	25	3	3	6	4
2011–12	Boston Bruins	NHL	69	9	6	15	15	7	1	0	1	2
2012–13	Ilves	SM-l	9	2	4	6	6	—	—	—	—	—
2012–13	Boston Bruins	NHL	46	10	7	17	8	22	4	5	9	0
2013–14	Boston Bruins	NHL	72	9	9	18	6	7	1	0	1	2
2014–15	Boston Bruins	NHL	71	6	7	13	12	—	—	—	—	—
2015–16	Rockford IceHogs	AHL	31	1	3	4	2	—	—	—	—	—
2015–16	New York Rangers	NHL	12	0	0	0	0	—	—	—	—	—
2015–16	Hartford Wolf Pack	AHL	23	5	6	11	6	—	—	—	—	—
2016–17	Brynäs IF	SHL	45	12	13	25	22	20	5	5	10	0
2017–18	Brynäs IF	SHL	14	1	4	5	12	—	—	—	—	—
NHL totals			582	85	87	172	135	75	9	10	19	10

Medal record

Ice hockey

Representing Canada

Spengler Cup
Gold medal – first place	2015 Davos	

=== International ===
Year	Team	Event	Result	GP	G	A	Pts	PIM
2001	Canada Atlantic	U17	6th	4	1	3	4	0
2003	Canada	WJC	2nd place, silver medalist(s)	6	0	0	0	2
2004	Canada	WJC	2nd place, silver medalist(s)	6	4	0	4	2
Junior totals				16	5	3	8	4

Awards and achievements
Preceded by Keith Ballard	Buffalo Sabres first-round draft pick 2002	Succeeded by Thomas Vanek
