= 2013 Stanley Cup playoffs =

Tournament details
- Dates: April 30–June 24, 2013
- Teams: 16
- Defending champions: Los Angeles Kings

Final positions
- Champions: Chicago Blackhawks
- Runners-up: Boston Bruins

Tournament statistics
- Scoring leader(s): David Krejci (Bruins) (26 points)

Awards
- MVP: Patrick Kane (Blackhawks)

The 2013 Stanley Cup playoffs was the playoff tournament of the National Hockey League (NHL) for the 2012–13 season. They began on April 30, 2013, following the conclusion of the regular season. The regular season was shortened to 48 games and the playoffs were pushed to a later date due to a lockout. The playoffs ended on June 24, 2013, with the Chicago Blackhawks defeating the Boston Bruins in the Stanley Cup Final in six games to win the Stanley Cup. Patrick Kane won the Conn Smythe Trophy as the playoffs MVP, with 19 points (9 goals and 10 assists).

The Blackhawks made the playoffs as the Presidents' Trophy winners with the most points (i.e., best record) during the regular season. The Detroit Red Wings increased their postseason appearance streak to twenty-two seasons, the longest active streak at the time. The Toronto Maple Leafs made the playoffs for the first time since 2004, breaking the longest active drought at the time. The 2013 Stanley Cup playoffs marked the first time since 1996 that every Original Six team (Boston, Chicago, the Detroit Red Wings, the Montreal Canadiens, the New York Rangers, and Toronto) advanced to the playoffs in the same year. Additionally, four Canadian teams qualified for the playoffs (Montreal, the Ottawa Senators, Toronto, and the Vancouver Canucks), the most since 2006, three of those teams are from Eastern Canada. The first-round series between Montreal and Ottawa was the first playoff series between two Canadian teams since 2004. For the second time in three years, all three teams from California (the Anaheim Ducks, Los Angeles Kings, and San Jose Sharks) made the playoffs. The New Jersey Devils and Philadelphia Flyers missed the playoffs this year, marking the first time this happened since the Devils relocated from Colorado in 1982.

For the first time since 1945, the four semifinalists were the previous four Stanley Cup champions: the Pittsburgh Penguins (2009), Chicago (2010), Boston (2011), and Los Angeles (2012). In fact, Detroit, the 2008 Stanley Cup champion, was the last team to be eliminated in the conference semifinals, so the last five teams remaining were the previous five champions. The 2013 Stanley Cup Final was contested between the Blackhawks and Bruins, the first meeting in the Finals between the two teams, and the first time that two Original Six teams competed in the Finals since Montreal defeated the New York Rangers in the 1979 Stanley Cup Final. It is also the most recent Stanley Cup Final to feature two Original Six teams.

The Blackhawks also became the first Presidents' Trophy winners to win the Stanley Cup since the Red Wings in 2008. To date they are the most recent team to accomplish this feat and most recent Presidents' Trophy winners to even reach the Finals.

These playoffs featured 27 overtime games, the second-most in NHL history behind the 1993 playoffs with 28.

== Playoff seeds ==
The top eight teams in each conference qualified for the playoffs. The top three seeds in each conference were awarded to the division winners; while the five remaining spots were awarded to the highest finishers in their respective conferences.

The following teams qualified for the playoffs:

=== Eastern Conference ===
1. Pittsburgh Penguins, Atlantic Division champions, Eastern Conference regular season champions – 72 points
2. Montreal Canadiens, Northeast Division champions – 63 points
3. Washington Capitals, Southeast Division champions – 57 points
4. Boston Bruins – 62 points
5. Toronto Maple Leafs – 57 points
6. New York Rangers – 56 points (22 ROWs)
7. Ottawa Senators – 56 points (21 ROWs)
8. New York Islanders – 55 points

=== Western Conference ===
1. Chicago Blackhawks, Central Division champions, Western Conference regular season champions, Presidents' Trophy winners – 77 points
2. Anaheim Ducks, Pacific Division champions – 66 points
3. Vancouver Canucks, Northwest Division champions – 59 points
4. St. Louis Blues – 60 points
5. Los Angeles Kings – 59 points
6. San Jose Sharks – 57 points
7. Detroit Red Wings – 56 points
8. Minnesota Wild – 55 points

== Playoff bracket ==
In each round, teams competed in a best-of-seven series following a 2–2–1–1–1 format (scores in the bracket indicate the number of games won in each best-of-seven series). The team with home ice advantage played at home for games one and two (and games five and seven, if necessary), and the other team played at home for games three and four (and game six, if necessary). The top eight teams in each conference made the playoffs, with the three division winners seeded 1–3 based on regular season record, and the five remaining teams seeded 4–8.

The NHL used "re-seeding" instead of a fixed bracket playoff system. During the first three rounds, the highest remaining seed in each conference was matched against the lowest remaining seed, the second-highest remaining seed played the second-lowest remaining seed, and so forth. The higher-seeded team was awarded home ice advantage. The two conference winners then advanced to the Stanley Cup Final, where home ice advantage was awarded to the team that had the better regular season record.

Conference quarterfinals	Conference semifinals
1	Pittsburgh	4
8	NY Islanders	2
1	Pittsburgh	4
7	Ottawa	1
2	Montreal	1
7	Ottawa	4
Eastern Conference
3	Washington	3
6	NY Rangers	4
4	Boston	4
6	NY Rangers	1
4	Boston	4
5	Toronto	3
1	Chicago	4
8	Minnesota	1
1	Chicago	4
7	Detroit	3
2	Anaheim	3
7	Detroit	4
Western Conference
3	Vancouver	0
6	San Jose	4
5	Los Angeles	4
6	San Jose	3
4	St. Louis	2
5	Los Angeles	4

Conference finals
1	Pittsburgh	0
4	Boston	4
1	Chicago	4
5	Los Angeles	1

Stanley Cup Final
E4	Boston	2
W1	Chicago	4

== Conference quarterfinals ==
=== Eastern Conference quarterfinals ===
==== (1) Pittsburgh Penguins vs. (8) New York Islanders ====
The Pittsburgh Penguins entered the playoffs as the Eastern Conference regular season champions, earning 72 points. The New York Islanders earned 55 points during the regular season to finish eighth overall in the Eastern Conference. This was the fourth playoff meeting for these two teams, with the Islanders having won all three of the previous playoff series. Their most recent meeting was in the 1993 Patrick Division finals, where New York upset first place Pittsburgh in seven games. The Penguins won four of the five games in the regular season series.

The Penguins defeated the Islanders in six games. Pittsburgh goalie Marc-Andre Fleury stopped all 26 New York shots in a 5–0 shutout in game one. The Islanders then took game two, 4–3, as New York's Colin McDonald, Matt Martin, and Kyle Okposo scored three unanswered goals in the second and third periods. In game three, Chris Kunitz scored the winning goal on a power play at 08:44 of overtime to give Pittsburgh a 5–4 victory. New York evened the series with a 6–4 win in game four, with Mark Streit, John Tavares, and Casey Cizikas scoring three unanswered goals in the third period. Penguins head coach Dan Bylsma then replaced Fleury with Tomas Vokoun as starting goalie for game five, who stopped all 31 shots to lead Pittsburgh to a 4–0 win. In the sixth game, the Islanders put up three leads only to have the Penguins tie it up three consecutive times. Brooks Orpik scored at 07:49 of overtime to give Pittsburgh a 4–3 victory and their fourth and final win of the series.

May 1	New York Islanders	0–5	Pittsburgh Penguins	Consol Energy Center	Recap
No scoring		First period	03:30 – pp – Beau Bennett (1); 13:23 – Pascal Dupuis (1)
No scoring		Second period	01:19 – pp – Kris Letang (1); 01:51 – Pascal Dupuis (2); 13:07 – Tanner Glass (1)
No scoring		Third period	No scoring
Evgeni Nabokov 11 saves / 15 shots Kevin Poulin 10 saves / 11 shots		Goalie stats	Marc-Andre Fleury 26 saves / 26 shots

May 3	New York Islanders	4–3	Pittsburgh Penguins	Consol Energy Center	Recap
Matt Moulson (1) – pp – 07:04		First period	00:43 – Evgeni Malkin (1); 03:19 – pp – Sidney Crosby (1); 07:22 – Sidney Crosby (2)
Colin McDonald (1) – 05:12; Matt Martin (1) – 10:37		Second period	No scoring
Kyle Okposo (1) – 12:23		Third period	No scoring
Evgeni Nabokov 30 saves / 33 shots		Goalie stats	Marc-Andre Fleury 38 saves / 42 shots

May 5	Pittsburgh Penguins	5–4	OT	New York Islanders	Nassau Coliseum	Recap
Jarome Iginla (1) – pp – 13:18; Chris Kunitz (1) – pp – 13:37; Pascal Dupuis (3) – 19:00		First period		01:43 – Matt Moulson (2); 05:41 – Casey Cizikas (1)
Douglas Murray (1) – 17:10		Second period		No scoring
No scoring		Third period		05:31 – sh – Kyle Okposo (2); 10:48 – John Tavares (1)
Chris Kunitz (2) – pp – 08:44		First overtime period		No scoring
Marc-Andre Fleury 32 saves / 36 shots		Goalie stats		Evgeni Nabokov 20 saves / 25 shots

May 7	Pittsburgh Penguins	4–6	New York Islanders	Nassau Coliseum	Recap
James Neal (1) – 14:50		First period	14:05 – Brian Strait (1)
Evgeni Malkin (2) – 07:17; Brandon Sutter (1) – 11:03		Second period	06:19 – pp – Mark Streit (1); 18:36 – Kyle Okposo (3)
Pascal Dupuis (4) – 00:41		Third period	04:30 – Mark Streit (2); 10:11 – John Tavares (2); 18:44 – Casey Cizikas (2)
Marc-Andre Fleury 18 saves / 24 shots		Goalie stats	Evgeni Nabokov 27 saves / 31 shots

May 9	New York Islanders	0–4	Pittsburgh Penguins	Consol Energy Center	Recap
No scoring		First period	No scoring
No scoring		Second period	07:25 – Tyler Kennedy (1); 08:47 – Douglas Murray (2); 14:00 – Sidney Crosby (3)
No scoring		Third period	05:43 – pp – Kris Letang (2)
Evgeni Nabokov 23 saves / 27 shots Kevin Poulin 4 saves / 4 shots		Goalie stats	Tomas Vokoun 31 saves / 31 shots

May 11	Pittsburgh Penguins	4–3	OT	New York Islanders	Nassau Coliseum	Recap
Jarome Iginla (2) – 07:39		First period		05:36 – John Tavares (3); 19:23 – Colin McDonald (2)
Pascal Dupuis (5) – 10:59		Second period		No scoring
Paul Martin (1) – 14:44		Third period		02:21 – Michael Grabner (1)
Brooks Orpik (1) – 07:49		First overtime period		No scoring
Tomas Vokoun 35 saves / 38 shots		Goalie stats		Evgeni Nabokov 17 saves / 21 shots

Pittsburgh won series 4–2

==== (2) Montreal Canadiens vs. (7) Ottawa Senators ====
The Montreal Canadiens entered the playoffs as the second seed in the Eastern Conference by winning the Northeast Division with 63 points. The Ottawa Senators earned 56 points during the regular season, losing the tiebreaker to the New York Rangers in regulation + overtime wins (22 to 21) to finish seventh overall in the Eastern Conference. This was the first playoff series between these two teams, and the first playoff series between teams from Montreal and Ottawa since 1928, when the Montreal Maroons defeated the original Ottawa Senators in the Canadian Division Quarterfinals. The two teams split their four-game regular season series.

The Senators defeated the Canadiens in five games. Midway through the second period of game one, Senators defenceman Eric Gryba was given a five-minute major penalty, a game misconduct, and later a two-game suspension after delivering a hit on Montreal's Lars Eller that sent the Canadiens' centre to the hospital. Despite Gryba's ejection, the Senators won the game, 4–2, with goalie Craig Anderson stopping 48 out of 50 Montreal shots on goal. The Canadiens took game two, 3–1, led by goalie Carey Price's 29 saves. Emotions between the two division rivals boiled over in game three as the teams combined for 236 penalty minutes, but Ottawa centre Jean-Gabriel Pageau scored a hat trick, leading the Senators to a 6–1 victory. The Canadiens then jumped to a 2–0 lead in the second period of game four, but Ottawa scored twice in the final ten minutes of the game. Mika Zibanejad scored a goal off his skate at 11:55 of the third period, cutting the lead to 2–1, with the goal allowed to stand after a video review determined that he did not kick the puck into the net. Cory Conacher got the tying goal with 22.6 seconds left in regulation, and at intermission Montreal replaced an injured Price with Peter Budaj in goal. Kyle Turris scored the winner at 02:32 of overtime to give Ottawa the 3–2 win. The Senators then eliminated the Canadiens with a 6–1 victory in game five; Montreal was without several players due to injury including Price and captain Brian Gionta.

One of the quirkier story lines of the series was the large number of teeth lost by players, highlighted by Anderson losing one in game one, Price losing one in game two, and Pageau after taking a stick to the mouth from Montreal defenceman P. K. Subban while scoring his first ever NHL playoff goal, and first of three in game three.

May 2	Ottawa Senators	4–2	Montreal Canadiens	Bell Centre	Recap
Erik Karlsson (1) – 17:25		First period	No scoring
No scoring		Second period	13:09 – Rene Bourque (1); 14:08 – pp – Brendan Gallagher (1)
Jakob Silfverberg (1) – 03:27; Marc Methot (1) – 05:20; Guillaume Latendresse (1) – 13:55		Third period	No scoring
Craig Anderson 48 saves / 50 shots		Goalie stats	Carey Price 27 saves / 31 shots

May 3	Ottawa Senators	1–3	Montreal Canadiens	Bell Centre	Recap
No scoring		First period	No scoring
Milan Michalek (1) – 08:16		Second period	03:20 – Ryan White (1); 04:13 – Brendan Gallagher (2); 18:57 – Michael Ryder (1)
No scoring		Third period	No scoring
Craig Anderson 31 saves / 34 shots		Goalie stats	Carey Price 29 saves / 30 shots

May 5	Montreal Canadiens	1–6	Ottawa Senators	Scotiabank Place	Recap
Rene Bourque (2) – pp – 14:34		First period	05:58 – pp – Daniel Alfredsson (1)
No scoring		Second period	04:40 – Jean-Gabriel Pageau (1)
No scoring		Third period	01:18 – Jean-Gabriel Pageau (2); 07:00 – Kyle Turris (1); 07:08 – pp – Jakob Silfverberg (2); 18:02 – pp – Jean-Gabriel Pageau (3)
Carey Price 24 saves / 30 shots		Goalie stats	Craig Anderson 33 saves / 34 shots

May 7	Montreal Canadiens	2–3	OT	Ottawa Senators	Scotiabank Place	Recap
No scoring		First period		No scoring
P.K. Subban (1) – 02:52; Alex Galchenyuk (1) – 03:54		Second period		No scoring
No scoring		Third period		11:55 – Mika Zibanejad (1); 19:37 – Cory Conacher (1)
No scoring		First overtime period		02:32 – Kyle Turris (2)
Carey Price 30 saves / 32 shots Peter Budaj 1 save / 2 shots		Goalie stats		Craig Anderson 26 saves / 28 shots

May 9	Ottawa Senators	6–1	Montreal Canadiens	Bell Centre	Recap
Zack Smith (1) – 02:17; Cory Conacher (2) – 12:26		First period	19:45 – pp – P.K. Subban (2)
Kyle Turris (3) – sh – 11:29		Second period	No scoring
Daniel Alfredsson (2) – pp – 06:22; Cory Conacher (3) – pp – 12:27; Erik Condra (1) – pp – 16:12		Third period	No scoring
Craig Anderson 33 saves / 34 shots		Goalie stats	Peter Budaj 23 saves / 29 shots

Ottawa won series 4–1

==== (3) Washington Capitals vs. (6) New York Rangers ====
The Washington Capitals entered the playoffs as the third seed in the Eastern Conference by winning the Southeast Division with 57 points. The New York Rangers earned 56 points during the regular season, winning the tiebreaker over Ottawa in regulation + overtime wins (22 to 21) to finish sixth overall in the Eastern Conference. This was the eighth playoff meeting for these two teams, and the fourth in the last five years, with the Capitals having won four of the seven previous series. This was a rematch of the previous year's Eastern Conference semifinals, which the Rangers won in seven games. New York won two of the three games in the regular season series.

The Rangers advanced to the second round after soundly defeating the Capitals in game seven, 5–0. The home team won the first six games before the visiting team won game seven, and it was the first road win in a seventh game in franchise history for the Rangers. Washington scored three unanswered goals in the second period of game one to win, 3–1. In game two, Capitals defenceman Mike Green scored the only goal in the game at 08:00 of overtime. The Rangers then evened the series after recording back-to-back 4–3 victories in games three and four, aided by Derick Brassard's one goal and two assists in the former, and Carl Hagelin's one goal and two assists in the latter. Washington won game five, 2–1 on Mike Ribeiro's goal at 09:24 of overtime, while Brassard's second period goal proved to be the difference in New York's 1–0 win in game six. The Rangers then controlled game seven, winning 5–0, with five different players scoring for New York, and goalie Henrik Lundqvist stopping all 35 Washington shots in his second consecutive shutout.

May 2	New York Rangers	1–3	Washington Capitals	Verizon Center	Recap
Carl Hagelin (1) – 16:44		First period	No scoring
No scoring		Second period	06:59 – pp – Alexander Ovechkin (1); 14:21 – Marcus Johansson (1); 15:07 – Jason Chimera (1)
No scoring		Third period	No scoring
Henrik Lundqvist 27 saves / 30 shots		Goalie stats	Braden Holtby 35 saves / 36 shots

May 4	New York Rangers	0–1	OT	Washington Capitals	Verizon Center	Recap
No scoring		First period		No scoring
No scoring		Second period		No scoring
No scoring		Third period		No scoring
No scoring		First overtime period		08:00 – pp – Mike Green (1)
Henrik Lundqvist 37 saves / 38 shots		Goalie stats		Braden Holtby 24 saves / 24 shots

May 6	Washington Capitals	3–4	New York Rangers	Madison Square Garden	Recap
Nicklas Backstrom (1) – 04:06		First period	12:50 – Brian Boyle (1)
Mike Green (2) – 17:19		Second period	01:23 – pp – Derick Brassard (1)
Jay Beagle (1) – 07:19		Third period	02:53 – Arron Asham (1); 13:35 – Derek Stepan (1)
Braden Holtby 26 saves / 30 shots		Goalie stats	Henrik Lundqvist 28 saves / 31 shots

May 8	Washington Capitals	3–4	New York Rangers	Madison Square Garden	Recap
No scoring		First period	16:25 – Brad Richards (1)
Mathieu Perreault (1) – 13:08; Troy Brouwer (1) – 19:42		Second period	10:13 – Carl Hagelin (2)
Karl Alzner (1) – 07:31		Third period	00:59 – pp – Daniel Girardi (1); 06:02 – Derek Stepan (2)
Braden Holtby 30 saves / 34 shots		Goalie stats	Henrik Lundqvist 27 saves / 30 shots

May 10	New York Rangers	1–2	OT	Washington Capitals	Verizon Center	Recap
Brian Boyle (2) – 00:53		First period		No scoring
No scoring		Second period		07:44 – pp – Joel Ward (1)
No scoring		Third period		No scoring
No scoring		First overtime period		09:24 – Mike Ribeiro (1)
Henrik Lundqvist 33 saves / 35 shots		Goalie stats		Braden Holtby 24 saves / 25 shots

May 12	Washington Capitals	0–1	New York Rangers	Madison Square Garden	Recap
No scoring		First period	No scoring
No scoring		Second period	09:39 – Derick Brassard (2)
No scoring		Third period	No scoring
Braden Holtby 28 saves / 29 shots		Goalie stats	Henrik Lundqvist 27 saves / 27 shots

May 13	New York Rangers	5–0	Washington Capitals	Verizon Center	Recap
Arron Asham (2) – 13:19		First period	No scoring
Taylor Pyatt (1) – 03:24; Michael Del Zotto (1) – 05:34		Second period	No scoring
Ryan Callahan (1) – 00:13; Mats Zuccarello (1) – 06:39		Third period	No scoring
Henrik Lundqvist 35 saves / 35 shots		Goalie stats	Braden Holtby 22 saves / 27 shots

New York won series 4–3

==== (4) Boston Bruins vs. (5) Toronto Maple Leafs ====
The Boston Bruins entered the playoffs as the fourth seed in the Eastern Conference with 62 points. The Toronto Maple Leafs earned 57 points during the regular season to finish fifth overall in the Eastern Conference. This was the fourteenth playoff series between these two teams, with the Maple Leafs having won eight of the previous thirteen series. Their most recent meeting was the 1974 Stanley Cup quarterfinals, where the Bruins defeated the Maple Leafs in four games. Boston won three of the four games in the regular season series.

The Bruins rallied from a 4–1 third period deficit in game seven to defeat the Maple Leafs in overtime, 5–4, and advance to the second round. Boston jumped to a 3–1 lead in the series before Toronto won two straight games to force game seven. David Krejci led Boston to a 4–1 victory in game one with a goal and two assists. Joffrey Lupul then scored two goals to lead the Maple Leafs to a 4–2 victory in game two. The Bruins then took game three, 5–2, aided by goalie Tuukka Rask's 45 saves out of 47 shots. Krejci's goal at 13:06 of overtime then gave Boston the win in game four, 4–3. But the Leafs bounced back in game five with a 2–1 victory, behind James Reimer's 43 saves. Reimer then stopped 29 of 30 shots in Toronto's 2–1 win in game six. In game seven, the Maple Leafs jumped to a 4–1 lead in the third period, aided by two goals by Cody Franson. But the Bruins began their comeback with Nathan Horton's goal at 09:18. Then, after pulling goalie Rask to add an extra attacker, Boston scored twice within the last two minutes of regulation to tie the game, first with Milan Lucic's score at 18:38, and then Patrice Bergeron's goal at 19:09. Bergeron then scored at 06:05 in overtime to give the Bruins the 5–4 win and the series. It was the first game seven in NHL playoff history in which a team trailing by three goals in the third period went on to win the game and, therefore, the series. These circumstances were matched during the first round of the 2019 Stanley Cup playoffs, when the San Jose Sharks overcame a three-goal deficit in the third period of game seven over the Vegas Golden Knights to win the series.

May 1	Toronto Maple Leafs	1–4	Boston Bruins	TD Garden	Recap
James van Riemsdyk (1) – pp – 01:54		First period	16:20 – Wade Redden (1); 19:48 – pp – Nathan Horton (1)
No scoring		Second period	10:25 – David Krejci (1); 15:44 – Johnny Boychuk (1)
No scoring		Third period	No scoring
James Reimer 36 saves / 40 shots		Goalie stats	Tuukka Rask 19 saves / 20 shots

May 4	Toronto Maple Leafs	4–2	Boston Bruins	TD Garden	Recap
No scoring		First period	No scoring
Joffrey Lupul (1) – pp – 05:18; Joffrey Lupul (2) – 11:56		Second period	01:56 – Nathan Horton (2)
Phil Kessel (1) – 00:53; James van Riemsdyk (2) – 16:53		Third period	10:35 – Johnny Boychuk (2)
James Reimer 39 saves / 41 shots		Goalie stats	Tuukka Rask 28 saves / 32 shots

May 6	Boston Bruins	5–2	Toronto Maple Leafs	Air Canada Centre	Recap
Adam McQuaid (1) – 13:42		First period	No scoring
Rich Peverley (1) – 05:57; Nathan Horton (3) – 14:35; Daniel Paille (1) – sh – 16:37		Second period	13:45 – pp – Jake Gardiner (1)
David Krejci (2) – en – 18:43		Third period	00:47 – pp – Phil Kessel (2)
Tuukka Rask 45 saves / 47 shots		Goalie stats	James Reimer 33 saves / 37 shots

May 8	Boston Bruins	4–3	OT	Toronto Maple Leafs	Air Canada Centre	Recap
No scoring		First period		02:35 – Joffrey Lupul (3); 18:32 – Cody Franson (1)
Patrice Bergeron (1) – pp – 00:32; David Krejci (3) – 12:59; David Krejci (4) – pp – 16:39		Second period		17:23 – Clarke MacArthur (1)
No scoring		Third period		No scoring
David Krejci (5) – 13:06		First overtime period		No scoring
Tuukka Rask 45 saves / 48 shots		Goalie stats		James Reimer 41 saves / 45 shots

May 10	Toronto Maple Leafs	2–1	Boston Bruins	TD Garden	Recap
No scoring		First period	No scoring
Tyler Bozak (1) – sh – 11:27		Second period	No scoring
Clarke MacArthur (2) – 01:58		Third period	11:12 – Zdeno Chara (1)
James Reimer 43 saves / 44 shots		Goalie stats	Tuukka Rask 31 saves / 33 shots

May 12	Boston Bruins	1–2	Toronto Maple Leafs	Air Canada Centre	Recap
No scoring		First period	No scoring
No scoring		Second period	No scoring
Milan Lucic (1) – 19:34		Third period	01:48 – Dion Phaneuf (1); 08:59 – Phil Kessel (3)
Tuukka Rask 24 saves / 26 shots		Goalie stats	James Reimer 29 saves / 30 shots

May 13	Toronto Maple Leafs	4–5	OT	Boston Bruins	TD Garden	Recap
Cody Franson (2) – pp – 09:35		First period		05:39 – Matt Bartkowski (1)
Cody Franson (3) – 05:48		Second period		No scoring
Phil Kessel (4) – 02:09; Nazem Kadri (1) – 05:29		Third period		09:18 – Nathan Horton (4); 18:38 – Milan Lucic (2); 19:09 – Patrice Bergeron (2)
No scoring		First overtime period		06:05 – Patrice Bergeron (3)
James Reimer 30 saves / 35 shots		Goalie stats		Tuukka Rask 24 saves / 28 shots

Boston won series 4–3

=== Western Conference quarterfinals ===
==== (1) Chicago Blackhawks vs. (8) Minnesota Wild ====
The Chicago Blackhawks entered the playoffs as the Western Conference regular season champions and Presidents' Trophy winners, earning 77 points. The Minnesota Wild earned 55 points during the regular season to finish eighth overall in the Western Conference. This was the first playoff meeting for these two teams. Chicago won two of the three games in the regular season series.

The Blackhawks defeated the Wild in five games. Bryan Bickell's goal at 16:35 of overtime gave Chicago a 2–1 victory in game one. Then, Michael Frolik and Patrick Sharp each scored two goals in the Blackhawks' 5–2 win in game two. Jason Zucker scored at 02:15 of overtime to give the Wild a 3–2 victory in game three. But the Blackhawks controlled games four and five, with Chicago goalie Corey Crawford making 25 saves in a 3–0 shutout in the former, and winger Marian Hossa leading the Blackhawks with two goals and one assist in a 5–1 win in the latter.

April 30	Minnesota Wild	1–2	OT	Chicago Blackhawks	United Center	Recap
Cal Clutterbuck (1) – 04:48		First period		No scoring
No scoring		Second period		02:06 – pp – Marian Hossa (1)
No scoring		Third period		No scoring
No scoring		First overtime period		16:35 – Bryan Bickell (1)
Josh Harding 35 saves / 37 shots		Goalie stats		Corey Crawford 26 saves / 27 shots

May 3	Minnesota Wild	2–5	Chicago Blackhawks	United Center	Recap
No scoring		First period	08:34 – Michael Frolik (1)
Devin Setoguchi (1) – 17:57		Second period	00:49 – sh – Michael Frolik (2)
Marco Scandella (1) – 16:29		Third period	03:44 – Patrick Sharp (1); 14:08 – Patrick Sharp (2); 19:49 – en – Bryan Bickell (2)
Josh Harding 43 saves / 47 shots		Goalie stats	Corey Crawford 26 saves / 28 shots

May 5	Chicago Blackhawks	2–3	OT	Minnesota Wild	Xcel Energy Center	Recap
Johnny Oduya (1) – 13:26		First period		18:30 – Pierre-Marc Bouchard (1)
No scoring		Second period		No scoring
Duncan Keith (1) – 17:14		Third period		03:09 – Zach Parise (1)
No scoring		First overtime period		02:15 – Jason Zucker (1)
Corey Crawford 34 saves / 37 shots		Goalie stats		Josh Harding 25 saves / 27 shots

May 7	Chicago Blackhawks	3–0	Minnesota Wild	Xcel Energy Center	Recap
Patrick Sharp (3) – 08:48		First period	No scoring
Patrick Sharp (4) – 01:02		Second period	No scoring
Bryan Bickell (3) – 12:46		Third period	No scoring
Corey Crawford 25 saves / 25 shots		Goalie stats	Josh Harding 5 saves / 6 shots Darcy Kuemper 16 saves / 18 shots

May 9	Minnesota Wild	1–5	Chicago Blackhawks	United Center	Recap
No scoring		First period	15:39 – Marian Hossa (2)
Torrey Mitchell (1) – 10:11		Second period	03:19 – Marcus Kruger (1); 06:26 – Marian Hossa (3); 10:46 – Andrew Shaw (1)
No scoring		Third period	06:04 – pp – Patrick Sharp (5)
Josh Harding 15 saves / 18 shots Darcy Kuemper 13 saves / 15 shots		Goalie stats	Corey Crawford 21 saves / 22 shots

Chicago won series 4–1

==== (2) Anaheim Ducks vs. (7) Detroit Red Wings ====
The Anaheim Ducks entered the playoffs as the second seed in the Western Conference by winning the Pacific Division with 66 points. The Detroit Red Wings earned 56 points during the regular season to finish seventh overall in the Western Conference, extending their streak of consecutive playoff appearances to 22. This was the sixth playoff meeting for these two teams, with the Red Wings having won three of the five previous series. The most recent meeting of these teams was in the 2009 Western Conference semifinals, which Detroit won in seven games. Detroit won two of the three games in the regular season series.

The Red Wings defeated the Ducks in game seven of the series, 3–2, to advance to the next round. Four games in the series were decided in overtime. In game one, Teemu Selanne scored a power play goal in the third period, and Francois Beauchemin added an empty netter in the final minute, to give Anaheim a 3–1 win. In game two, the Ducks scored three unanswered goals in the third period to tie the game, 4–4, but Red Wings winger Gustav Nyquist scored at 01:21 of overtime to give Detroit the victory. game three was scoreless in the second period until Detroit forward Justin Abdelkader was given a five-minute major penalty, a game misconduct, and later a two-game suspension after illegally charging Anaheim defenceman Toni Lydman. Although they scored only once in the ensuing five-minute power play, goalie Jonas Hiller stopped all 23 Detroit shots to lead the Ducks to a 4–0 win. The next three games went into overtime, as Damien Brunner scored at 15:10 of the extra session to give the Red Wings a 3–2 victory in game four, Nick Bonino at 01:54 to give the Ducks a 3–2 victory in game five, and Henrik Zetterberg at 01:04 in Detroit's 4–3 win in game six. Zetterberg then led the Red Wings with a goal and an assist, and goalie Jimmy Howard made 31 saves in their 3–2 victory in game seven.

This remains the last time the Red Wings won a playoff series, and with the Buffalo Sabres winning their first round matchup against the Boston Bruins in 2026, the Red Wings currently hold the longest active playoff series win drought.

April 30	Detroit Red Wings	1–3	Anaheim Ducks	Honda Center	Recap
Daniel Cleary (1) – pp – 16:05		First period	10:24 – pp – Nick Bonino (1)
No scoring		Second period	No scoring
No scoring		Third period	01:29 – pp – Teemu Selanne (1); 19:37 – en – Francois Beauchemin (1)
Jimmy Howard 24 saves / 26 shots		Goalie stats	Jonas Hiller 21 saves / 22 shots

May 2	Detroit Red Wings	5–4	OT	Anaheim Ducks	Honda Center	Recap
Justin Abdelkader (1) – 00:48; Damien Brunner (1) – 04:20		First period		No scoring
Johan Franzen (1) – pp – 01:04		Second period		10:53 – pp – Saku Koivu (1)
Johan Franzen (2) – pp – 00:20		Third period		07:50 – Ryan Getzlaf (1); 12:31 – Kyle Palmieri (1); 17:38 – Bobby Ryan (1)
Gustav Nyquist (1) – pp – 01:21		First overtime period		No scoring
Jimmy Howard 28 saves / 32 shots		Goalie stats		Jonas Hiller 27 saves / 32 shots

May 4	Anaheim Ducks	4–0	Detroit Red Wings	Joe Louis Arena	Recap
No scoring		First period	No scoring
Nick Bonino (2) – pp – 15:29		Second period	No scoring
Ryan Getzlaf (2) – sh – 06:33; Emerson Etem (1) – 08:04; Matt Beleskey (1) – pp – 13:34		Third period	No scoring
Jonas Hiller 23 saves / 23 shots		Goalie stats	Jimmy Howard 25 saves / 29 shots

May 6	Anaheim Ducks	2–3	OT	Detroit Red Wings	Joe Louis Arena	Recap
Matt Beleskey (2) – 05:07		First period		No scoring
No scoring		Second period		No scoring
Dave Steckel (1) – 10:40		Third period		01:18 – Brendan Smith (1); 13:27 – Pavel Datsyuk (1)
No scoring		First overtime period		15:10 – Damien Brunner (2)
Jonas Hiller 46 saves / 49 shots		Goalie stats		Jimmy Howard 31 saves / 33 shots

May 8	Detroit Red Wings	2–3	OT	Anaheim Ducks	Honda Center	Recap
Johan Franzen (3) – pp – 05:28		First period		17:41 – Kyle Palmieri (2)
Mikael Samuelsson (1) – 10:08		Second period		19:28 – pp – Ryan Getzlaf (3)
No scoring		Third period		No scoring
No scoring		First overtime period		01:54 – Nick Bonino (3)
Jimmy Howard 31 saves / 34 shots		Goalie stats		Jonas Hiller 29 saves / 31 shots

May 10	Anaheim Ducks	3–4	OT	Detroit Red Wings	Joe Louis Arena	Recap
No scoring		First period		18:48 – Pavel Datsyuk (2)
Kyle Palmieri (3) – 11:31		Second period		No scoring
Emerson Etem (2) – 16:32; Bobby Ryan (2) – 17:23		Third period		06:19 – pp – Henrik Zetterberg (1); 11:30 – Daniel Cleary (2)
No scoring		First overtime period		01:04 – Henrik Zetterberg (2)
Jonas Hiller 25 saves / 29 shots		Goalie stats		Jimmy Howard 34 saves / 37 shots

May 12	Detroit Red Wings	3–2	Anaheim Ducks	Honda Center	Recap
Henrik Zetterberg (3) – 01:49; Justin Abdelkader (2) – sh – 16:37		First period	13:48 – Emerson Etem (3)
Valtteri Filppula (1) – 13:45		Second period	No scoring
No scoring		Third period	16:43 – pp – Francois Beauchemin (2)
Jimmy Howard 31 saves / 33 shots		Goalie stats	Jonas Hiller 29 saves / 32 shots

Detroit won series 4–3

==== (3) Vancouver Canucks vs. (6) San Jose Sharks ====
The Vancouver Canucks entered the playoffs as the third seed in the Western Conference by winning the Northwest Division with 59 points. The San Jose Sharks earned 57 points during the regular season to finish sixth overall in the Western Conference and third in the Pacific Division. This was the second playoff series between these two teams, with the only previous meeting being the 2011 Western Conference Final, where Vancouver defeated San Jose in five games. San Jose won all three games in the regular season series.

The Sharks recorded their first playoff sweep in team history. Led by Logan Couture's second period goal and a third period assist, San Jose scored three unanswered goals in game one to win, 3–1. The Canucks held a 2–1 lead late in the third period of game two off of Ryan Kesler's two goals, but then Patrick Marleau tied the game with 55 seconds left in regulation and Raffi Torres scored at 05:31 into overtime to give the Sharks a 3–2 victory. In game three of the series leading 2–1 to start the third period San Jose's Logan Couture and Patrick Marleau then each scored in a span of nine seconds giving the Sharks a 4–1 lead. The Sharks earned a 5–2 victory. In game four of the series Brent Burns scored to give the Sharks the lead, later Mason Raymond scored on the power play. San Jose took the lead again in the dying minutes of the first with a power play tally from Joe Pavelski to make it 2–1. In the third period the Vancouver Canucks rallied back to tie the game and gain the lead from the strengths of Alex Burrows and Alexander Edler goals to make it 3–2. In the last minutes of the third Joe Pavelski tallied the game tying goal as regulation ended 3–3. Patrick Marleau then scored the series winning goal at 13:18 of overtime in San Jose's 4–3 victory in game four.

May 1	San Jose Sharks	3–1	Vancouver Canucks	Rogers Arena	Recap
No scoring		First period	No scoring
Logan Couture (1) – pp – 16:35		Second period	12:26 – Kevin Bieksa (1)
Dan Boyle (1) – 09:17; Patrick Marleau (1) – 14:37		Third period	No scoring
Antti Niemi 29 saves / 30 shots		Goalie stats	Roberto Luongo 25 saves / 28 shots

May 3	San Jose Sharks	3–2	OT	Vancouver Canucks	Rogers Arena	Recap
Joe Thornton (1) – 13:22		First period		No scoring
No scoring		Second period		No scoring
Patrick Marleau (2) – 19:04		Third period		00:59 – pp – Ryan Kesler (1); 07:06 – Ryan Kesler (2)
Raffi Torres (1) – 05:31		First overtime period		No scoring
Antti Niemi 29 saves / 31 shots		Goalie stats		Roberto Luongo 30 saves / 33 shots

May 5	Vancouver Canucks	2–5	San Jose Sharks	HP Pavilion	Recap
No scoring		First period	14:08 – pp – Joe Pavelski (1)
Alexandre Burrows (1) – 11:07		Second period	07:20 – Joe Pavelski (2)
Dan Hamhuis (1) – 13:12		Third period	01:40 – pp – Logan Couture (2); 01:49 – Patrick Marleau (3); 04:07 – pp – Logan Couture (3)
Cory Schneider 23 saves / 28 shots Roberto Luongo 10 saves / 10 shots		Goalie stats	Antti Niemi 28 saves / 30 shots

May 7	Vancouver Canucks	3–4	OT	San Jose Sharks	HP Pavilion	Recap
Mason Raymond (1) – 07:54		First period		02:41 – Brent Burns (1); 14:52 – pp – Joe Pavelski (3)
No scoring		Second period		No scoring
Alexandre Burrows (2) – pp – 09:12; Alexander Edler (1) – 11:02		Third period		15:33 – pp – Joe Pavelski (4)
No scoring		First overtime period		13:18 – pp – Patrick Marleau (4)
Cory Schneider 43 saves / 47 shots		Goalie stats		Antti Niemi 32 saves / 35 shots

San Jose won series 4–0

==== (4) St. Louis Blues vs. (5) Los Angeles Kings ====
The St. Louis Blues entered the playoffs as the fourth seed in the Western Conference with 60 points. The Los Angeles Kings, entering as the defending Stanley Cup champions, earned 59 points during the regular season to finish fifth overall in the Western Conference. This was the fourth playoff series between these two teams, with St. Louis having won two of the three previous series. The most recent meeting was the previous year's Western Conference semifinals, in which the Kings swept the Blues out of the playoffs. Los Angeles won all three games in the regular season series.

The Kings overcame a 2–0 deficit to defeat the Blues in six games. All six games in the series were decided by only one goal. In game one, St. Louis had a 1–0 lead late in the third period before Los Angeles winger Justin Williams tied the game with 31.6 seconds left in regulation. In overtime, Blues defenceman Kevin Shattenkirk was given a four-minute penalty for high-sticking, but on the ensuing power play Kings goalie Jonathan Quick misplayed the puck behind his own net and St. Louis winger Alexander Steen wrapped it into the net for the game-winning shorthanded goal. The Blues also won game two by the same score of 2–1, as defenceman Barret Jackman scored the winning goal with 50.4 seconds remaining in the third period. The Kings then began their four-game winning streak in the series, first with a 1–0 victory in game three, as Quick stopped all 30 Blues shots on goal, and Slava Voynov providing Los Angeles' lone score. Williams and Anze Kopitar then scored 76 seconds apart in the third period of game four to help give Los Angeles a 4–3 victory. In game five, Blues defenceman Alex Pietrangelo tied the game with 44.1 seconds remaining in regulation, but Voynov scored at 08:00 of overtime and the Kings won, 3–2. Los Angeles then closed out the series with a 2–1 victory in game six, as forward Dustin Penner scored the winning goal with 0.2 seconds left in the second period.

April 30	Los Angeles Kings	1–2	OT	St. Louis Blues	Scottrade Center	Recap
No scoring		First period		09:05 – pp – Alexander Steen (1)
No scoring		Second period		No scoring
Justin Williams (1) – 19:28		Third period		No scoring
No scoring		First overtime period		13:26 – sh – Alexander Steen (2)
Jonathan Quick 40 saves / 42 shots		Goalie stats		Brian Elliott 28 saves / 29 shots

May 2	Los Angeles Kings	1–2	St. Louis Blues	Scottrade Center	Recap
Dustin Brown (1) – pp – 09:55		First period	No scoring
No scoring		Second period	No scoring
No scoring		Third period	03:44 – Patrik Berglund (1); 19:09 – Barret Jackman (1)
Jonathan Quick 23 saves / 25 shots		Goalie stats	Brian Elliott 28 saves / 29 shots

May 4	St. Louis Blues	0–1	Los Angeles Kings	Staples Center	Recap
No scoring		First period	No scoring
No scoring		Second period	04:56 – Slava Voynov (1)
No scoring		Third period	No scoring
Brian Elliott 20 saves / 21 shots		Goalie stats	Jonathan Quick 30 saves / 30 shots

May 6	St. Louis Blues	3–4	Los Angeles Kings	Staples Center	Recap
David Backes (1) – 01:12; T.J. Oshie (1) – pp – 04:32		First period	09:33 – Jeff Carter (1); 14:30 – Dustin Penner (1)
T.J. Oshie (2) – 05:46		Second period	No scoring
No scoring		Third period	07:14 – Anze Kopitar (1); 08:30 – Justin Williams (2)
Brian Elliott 25 saves / 29 shots		Goalie stats	Jonathan Quick 19 saves / 22 shots

May 8	Los Angeles Kings	3–2	OT	St. Louis Blues	Scottrade Center	Recap
No scoring		First period		No scoring
Jeff Carter (2) – 00:14		Second period		06:46 – Alexander Steen (3)
Jeff Carter (3) – pp – 00:54		Third period		19:15 – Alex Pietrangelo (1)
Slava Voynov (2) – 08:00		First overtime period		No scoring
Jonathan Quick 34 saves / 36 shots		Goalie stats		Brian Elliott 22 saves / 25 shots

May 10	St. Louis Blues	1–2	Los Angeles Kings	Staples Center	Recap
No scoring		First period	12:37 – Drew Doughty (1)
Chris Porter (1) – 04:39		Second period	19:59 – Dustin Penner (2)
No scoring		Third period	No scoring
Brian Elliott 14 saves / 16 shots		Goalie stats	Jonathan Quick 21 saves / 22 shots

Los Angeles won series 4–2

== Conference semifinals ==
=== Eastern Conference semifinals ===
==== (1) Pittsburgh Penguins vs. (7) Ottawa Senators ====
This was the fourth playoff meeting for these two teams, all occurring over the last seven seasons, with Pittsburgh winning the previous two. Their most recent meeting was in the 2010 Eastern Conference quarterfinals, which Pittsburgh won in six games. The Penguins won all three games in the regular season series.

The Penguins eliminated the Senators in five games. Evgeni Malkin recorded a goal and an assist in Pittsburgh's 4–1 victory in game one. In game two, Sidney Crosby recorded his second career playoff hat trick as the Penguins went on to win, 4–3. The Senators then took game three, 2–1, after Daniel Alfredsson tied the game with a short handed goal with only 22.6 seconds left in regulation, and Colin Greening scored the game winner at 07:39 of the second overtime period. But, Pittsburgh came back with a 7–3 victory in game four, with Kris Letang recording four assists. James Neal recorded his first career playoff hat trick in Pittsburgh's 6–2 win in game five to close out the series and help the Penguins advance to the conference finals.

May 14	Ottawa Senators	1–4	Pittsburgh Penguins	Consol Energy Center	Recap
Colin Greening (1) – 04:51		First period	02:41 – pp – Paul Martin (2); 12:15 – Evgeni Malkin (3)
No scoring		Second period	18:33 – pp – Chris Kunitz (3)
No scoring		Third period	11:24 – sh – Pascal Dupuis (6)
Craig Anderson 26 saves / 30 shots		Goalie stats	Tomas Vokoun 35 saves / 36 shots

May 17	Ottawa Senators	3–4	Pittsburgh Penguins	Consol Energy Center	Recap
Kyle Turris (4) – pp – 13:15		First period	03:16 – Sidney Crosby (4); 16:07 – Sidney Crosby (5)
Colin Greening (2) – 01:55		Second period	01:15 – pp – Sidney Crosby (6); 08:04 – Brenden Morrow (1)
Jean-Gabriel Pageau (4) – 02:01		Third period	No scoring
Craig Anderson 18 saves / 21 shots Robin Lehner 20 saves / 21 shots		Goalie stats	Tomas Vokoun 19 saves / 22 shots

May 19	Pittsburgh Penguins	1–2	2OT	Ottawa Senators	Scotiabank Place	Recap
No scoring		First period		No scoring
Tyler Kennedy (2) – 18:53		Second period		No scoring
No scoring		Third period		19:31 – sh – Daniel Alfredsson (3)
No scoring		Second overtime period		07:39 – Colin Greening (3)
Tomas Vokoun 46 saves / 48 shots		Goalie stats		Craig Anderson 49 saves / 50 shots

May 22	Pittsburgh Penguins	7–3	Ottawa Senators	Scotiabank Place	Recap
James Neal (2) – 14:56		First period	02:29 – sh – Milan Michalek (2); 16:15 – Kyle Turris (5)
Chris Kunitz (4) – 01:08; Jarome Iginla (3) – 01:48		Second period	No scoring
James Neal (3) – pp – 01:59; Pascal Dupuis (7) – sh – 08:08; Sidney Crosby (7) – 08:39; Jarome Iginla (4) – pp – 09:53		Third period	14:44 – pp – Daniel Alfredsson (4)
Tomas Vokoun 30 saves / 33 shots		Goalie stats	Craig Anderson 32 saves / 38 shots Robin Lehner 3 saves / 4 shots

May 24	Ottawa Senators	2–6	Pittsburgh Penguins	Consol Energy Center	Recap
No scoring		First period	06:25 – Brenden Morrow (2)
Milan Michalek (3) – 16:18		Second period	07:38 – pp – James Neal (4); 12:48 – Kris Letang (3); 19:30 – Evgeni Malkin (4)
Kyle Turris (6) – 13:32		Third period	11:07 – James Neal (5); 17:21 – James Neal (6)
Craig Anderson 27 saves / 33 shots		Goalie stats	Tomas Vokoun 29 saves / 31 shots

Pittsburgh won series 4–1

==== (4) Boston Bruins vs. (6) New York Rangers ====
This was the tenth playoff series between the teams, with Boston having won six of the nine previous series. They last met in the 1973 Stanley Cup Quarterfinals, which the Rangers won in five games. The Rangers won two of the three games in the regular season series.

The Bruins eliminated the Rangers in five games. Brad Marchand's goal at 15:40 of overtime gave Boston a 3–2 victory in game one. In game two, five different Boston players scored goals, giving them a 5–2 win. The Bruins then won game three, 2–1, as Daniel Paille scored the game winner with 03:31 left in regulation after the puck deflected off of Henrik Lundqvist's head, popped into the air and then bounced in an area around the goal crease where the Rangers goalie lost sight of it. The Rangers avoided elimination in game four, as Chris Kreider scored at 07:03 of overtime, redirecting Rick Nash's shot into the Bruins net, giving New York a 4–3 victory. But Boston was victorious in game five, 3–1, scoring three unanswered goals, including two from Gregory Campbell.

May 16	New York Rangers	2–3	OT	Boston Bruins	TD Garden	Recap
No scoring		First period		No scoring
Ryan McDonagh (1) – 19:58		Second period		12:23 – Zdeno Chara (2)
Derek Stepan (3) – 00:14		Third period		02:55 – pp – Torey Krug (1)
No scoring		First overtime period		15:40 – Brad Marchand (1)
Henrik Lundqvist 45 saves / 48 shots		Goalie stats		Tuukka Rask 33 saves / 35 shots

May 19	New York Rangers	2–5	Boston Bruins	TD Garden	Recap
Ryan Callahan (2) – 08:01		First period	05:28 – Torey Krug (2)
Rick Nash (1) – 03:20		Second period	02:24 – Gregory Campbell (1); 12:08 – Johnny Boychuk (3)
No scoring		Third period	00:26 – Brad Marchand (2); 12:39 – Milan Lucic (3)
Henrik Lundqvist 27 saves / 32 shots		Goalie stats	Tuukka Rask 35 saves / 37 shots

May 21	Boston Bruins	2–1	New York Rangers	Madison Square Garden	Recap
No scoring		First period	No scoring
No scoring		Second period	03:53 – Taylor Pyatt (2)
Johnny Boychuk (4) – 03:10; Daniel Paille (2) – 16:29		Third period	No scoring
Tuukka Rask 23 saves / 24 shots		Goalie stats	Henrik Lundqvist 32 saves / 34 shots

May 23	Boston Bruins	3–4	OT	New York Rangers	Madison Square Garden	Recap
No scoring		First period		No scoring
Nathan Horton (5) – pp – 04:39; Torey Krug (3) – pp – 07:41		Second period		08:39 – Carl Hagelin (3)
Tyler Seguin (1) – 08:06		Third period		01:15 – Derek Stepan (4); 10:00 – pp – Brian Boyle (3)
No scoring		First overtime period		07:03 – Chris Kreider (1)
Tuukka Rask 28 saves / 32 shots		Goalie stats		Henrik Lundqvist 37 saves / 40 shots

May 25	New York Rangers	1–3	Boston Bruins	TD Garden	Recap
Daniel Girardi (2) – pp – 10:39		First period	No scoring
No scoring		Second period	03:48 – pp – Torey Krug (4); 13:41 – Gregory Campbell (2)
No scoring		Third period	19:09 – en – Gregory Campbell (3)
Henrik Lundqvist 29 saves / 31 shots		Goalie stats	Tuukka Rask 28 saves / 29 shots

Boston won series 4–1

=== Western Conference semifinals ===
==== (1) Chicago Blackhawks vs. (7) Detroit Red Wings ====
This was the sixteenth playoff meeting between these two rivals and the last as Western Conference rivals before realignment, with Chicago having won eight of the previous fifteen series. Their most recent meeting was in the 2009 Western Conference Final, which Detroit won in five games. The Blackhawks won all four games in the regular season series.

The Blackhawks came back from a 3–1 series deficit to defeat the Red Wings in seven games. In game one, Johnny Oduya and Marcus Kruger scored in about three minutes apart in the third period, as Chicago broke a 1–1 tie to win, 4–1. Henrik Zetterberg then recorded two assists, leading the Red Wings to a 4–1 victory in game two. Detroit also won game three, 3–1, as goalie Jimmy Howard made 39 saves out of 40 shots, and Gustav Nyquist and Drew Miller scored in 31 seconds apart in the second period. The Red Wings then gave the Blackhawks their first three-game losing streak all season, as Howard made 28 saves in Detroit's 2–0 victory in game four. But Chicago began their comeback in the series in game five as Andrew Shaw scored two goals in a 4–1 win. In the third period of game six, the Blackhawks scored three straight goals from three different players, including one on a penalty shot by Michael Frolik, to overcome a one-goal deficit and eventually win 4–3. Brent Seabrook scored at 03:35 of overtime to give Chicago a 2–1 victory in game seven to advance to the conference finals. As stated earlier, this was the Red Wings' last game and series as a Western Conference team, as they moved to the Eastern Conference the following season.

May 15	Detroit Red Wings	1–4	Chicago Blackhawks	United Center	Recap
Damien Brunner (3) – 10:57		First period	09:03 – pp – Marian Hossa (4)
No scoring		Second period	No scoring
No scoring		Third period	08:02 – Johnny Oduya (2); 11:23 – Marcus Kruger (2); 19:11 – en – Patrick Sharp (6)
Jimmy Howard 38 saves / 41 shots		Goalie stats	Corey Crawford 20 saves / 21 shots

May 18	Detroit Red Wings	4–1	Chicago Blackhawks	United Center	Recap
No scoring		First period	14:05 – Patrick Kane (1)
Damien Brunner (4) – 02:40; Brendan Smith (2) – 16:08		Second period	No scoring
Johan Franzen (4) – 07:19; Valtteri Filppula (2) – 12:03		Third period	No scoring
Jimmy Howard 19 saves / 20 shots		Goalie stats	Corey Crawford 26 saves / 30 shots

May 20	Chicago Blackhawks	1–3	Detroit Red Wings	Joe Louis Arena	Recap
No scoring		First period	No scoring
No scoring		Second period	07:49 – Gustav Nyquist (2); 08:20 – Drew Miller (1)
Patrick Kane (2) – 04:35		Third period	06:46 – Pavel Datsyuk (3)
Corey Crawford 27 saves / 30 shots		Goalie stats	Jimmy Howard 39 saves / 40 shots

May 23	Chicago Blackhawks	0–2	Detroit Red Wings	Joe Louis Arena	Recap
No scoring		First period	No scoring
No scoring		Second period	10:03 – pp – Jakub Kindl (1)
No scoring		Third period	19:21 – en – Daniel Cleary (3)
Corey Crawford 25 saves / 26 shots		Goalie stats	Jimmy Howard 28 saves / 28 shots

May 25	Detroit Red Wings	1–4	Chicago Blackhawks	United Center	Recap
No scoring		First period	14:08 – Bryan Bickell (4)
Daniel Cleary (4) – 09:37		Second period	13:08 – pp – Andrew Shaw (2); 15:47 – pp – Jonathan Toews (1)
No scoring		Third period	06:58 – Andrew Shaw (3)
Jimmy Howard 41 saves / 45 shots		Goalie stats	Corey Crawford 25 saves / 26 shots

May 27	Chicago Blackhawks	4–3	Detroit Red Wings	Joe Louis Arena	Recap
Marian Hossa (5) – pp – 03:53		First period	18:51 – Patrick Eaves (1)
No scoring		Second period	10:11 – Joakim Andersson (1)
Michal Handzus (1) – 00:51; Bryan Bickell (5) – 05:48; Michael Frolik (3) – ps – 09:43		Third period	19:08 – Damien Brunner (5)
Corey Crawford 35 saves / 38 shots		Goalie stats	Jimmy Howard 24 saves / 28 shots

May 29	Detroit Red Wings	1–2	OT	Chicago Blackhawks	United Center	Recap
No scoring		First period		No scoring
No scoring		Second period		01:08 – Patrick Sharp (7)
Henrik Zetterberg (4) – 00:26		Third period		No scoring
No scoring		First overtime period		03:35 – Brent Seabrook (1)
Jimmy Howard 33 saves / 35 shots		Goalie stats		Corey Crawford 26 saves / 27 shots

Chicago won series 4–3

==== (5) Los Angeles Kings vs. (6) San Jose Sharks ====
This was the second playoff series meeting for these two teams. Their first meeting was in the 2011 Western Conference quarterfinals, which San Jose won in six games. The two teams split their four-game regular season series, with the home team winning each game.

In a series where the home team won all games, the Kings outlasted the Sharks in game seven at the Staples Center to advance to the conference finals. Los Angeles goalie Jonathan Quick stopped all 35 San Jose shots in a 2–0 home victory in game one. In game two, the Kings' Dustin Brown and Trevor Lewis scored power play goals in 22 seconds apart with less than 2 minutes left in regulation, overcoming a one-goal deficit to win, 4–3. With the series moving to HP Pavilion, Logan Couture's goal at 01:29 of overtime gave the Sharks a 2–1 victory in game three. San Jose then evened the series in game four with another 2–1 victory after building a 2–0 second period lead. In game five back at the Staples Center, the Kings limited the Sharks to 24 shots on goal and Quick recorded his second shutout in the series in a 3–0 win for Los Angeles. The series then ended with two consecutive 2–1 games: Joe Thornton and T.J. Galiardi scored for San Jose in game six at HP Pavilion, and Justin Williams scored both Los Angeles goals in game seven at the Staples Center.

May 14	San Jose Sharks	0–2	Los Angeles Kings	Staples Center	Recap
No scoring		First period	19:47 – Slava Voynov (3)
No scoring		Second period	12:30 – Mike Richards (1)
No scoring		Third period	No scoring
Antti Niemi 18 saves / 20 shots		Goalie stats	Jonathan Quick 35 saves / 35 shots

May 16	San Jose Sharks	3–4	Los Angeles Kings	Staples Center	Recap
No scoring		First period	03:06 – Jeff Carter (4)
Patrick Marleau (5) – 09:47; Brad Stuart (1) – 14:21		Second period	04:10 – pp – Drew Doughty (2)
Marc-Edouard Vlasic (1) – 08:56		Third period	18:17 – pp – Dustin Brown (2); 18:39 – pp – Trevor Lewis (1)
Antti Niemi 27 saves / 31 shots		Goalie stats	Jonathan Quick 28 saves / 31 shots

May 18	Los Angeles Kings	1–2	OT	San Jose Sharks	HP Pavilion	Recap
Tyler Toffoli (1) – 10:08		First period		01:34 – pp – Dan Boyle (2)
No scoring		Second period		No scoring
No scoring		Third period		No scoring
No scoring		First overtime period		01:29 – pp – Logan Couture (4)
Jonathan Quick 38 saves / 40 shots		Goalie stats		Antti Niemi 26 saves / 27 shots

May 21	Los Angeles Kings	1–2	San Jose Sharks	HP Pavilion	Recap
No scoring		First period	06:09 – Brent Burns (2)
No scoring		Second period	03:55 – pp – Logan Couture (5)
Mike Richards (2) – pp – 09:46		Third period	No scoring
Jonathan Quick 21 saves / 23 shots		Goalie stats	Antti Niemi 22 saves / 23 shots

May 23	San Jose Sharks	0–3	Los Angeles Kings	Staples Center	Recap
No scoring		First period	No scoring
No scoring		Second period	18:08 – Anze Kopitar (2)
No scoring		Third period	00:53 – Slava Voynov (4); 19:28 – en – Jeff Carter (5)
Antti Niemi 26 saves / 28 shots		Goalie stats	Jonathan Quick 24 saves / 24 shots

May 26	Los Angeles Kings	1–2	San Jose Sharks	HP Pavilion	Recap
No scoring		First period	06:09 – pp – Joe Thornton (2)
Dustin Brown (3) – 13:53		Second period	04:10 – T.J. Galiardi (1)
No scoring		Third period	No scoring
Jonathan Quick 24 saves / 26 shots		Goalie stats	Antti Niemi 24 saves / 25 shots

May 28	San Jose Sharks	1–2	Los Angeles Kings	Staples Center	Recap
No scoring		First period	No scoring
No scoring		Second period	04:11 – pp – Justin Williams (3); 07:08 – Justin Williams (4)
Dan Boyle (3) – 05:26		Third period	No scoring
Antti Niemi 16 saves / 18 shots		Goalie stats	Jonathan Quick 25 saves / 26 shots

Los Angeles won series 4–3

== Conference finals ==
=== Eastern Conference final ===
==== (1) Pittsburgh Penguins vs. (4) Boston Bruins ====
This was the fifth playoff series for these two teams, with each team having won two of the four previous meetings. This was also the third time that they met in a Wales/Eastern Conference Final, having met at this stage in their two previous playoff meetings; in 1991 the Penguins lost the first two games to the Bruins but went on to win the next four, and the next year (1992) they swept the Bruins out of the playoffs; the Penguins went on to win the Stanley Cup in both years. The Pittsburgh Penguins made it to their third Conference finals since 2008, while the Boston Bruins were making their second appearance in three years. The Penguins won all three games in the regular season series, all three games by one goal.

The Bruins swept the top seeded Penguins, as Boston goalie Tuukka Rask recorded his first two career playoff shutouts, and only allowed two Pittsburgh goals throughout the sweep. Penguins forwards Evgeni Malkin, Sidney Crosby, Jarome Iginla, Pascal Dupuis and James Neal had scored between them 28 goals and 64 points during the first two rounds, but against the Bruins they were outscored 12–2 with Dupuis recording a single assist. The Penguins had scored 13 power-play goals in the first 11 games, but went 0-for 15 on the powerplay in the Conference Final. David Krejci had two goals in the Bruins' 3–0 game one victory. In game two, the Bruins recorded six goals and Rask limited the Penguins to only one goal. Patrice Bergeron then scored at 15:19 of the second overtime period of game three to give Boston a 2–1 win. Finally in game four, Adam McQuaid scored at 05:01 of the third period, the only goal in the game, to give the Bruins a 1–0 win and a trip to the Cup Final. This marked the first time since 1979 that the Penguins were swept in a playoff series; the Bruins also swept the Penguins out of that year's playoffs. During the 2012–13 season trade deadline, the Bruins were close to acquiring Iginla from the Calgary Flames, but he chose the Penguins instead; Milan Lucic said after the series that Iginla's spurning of Boston ignited the sweep of Pittsburgh, suggesting "When a guy chooses another team over your team, it does light a little bit of a fire underneath you."

June 1	Boston Bruins	3–0	Pittsburgh Penguins	Consol Energy Center	Recap
David Krejci (6) – 08:23		First period	No scoring
No scoring		Second period	No scoring
David Krejci (7) – 04:04; Nathan Horton (6) – 07:51		Third period	No scoring
Tuukka Rask 29 saves / 29 shots		Goalie stats	Tomas Vokoun 27 saves / 30 shots

June 3	Boston Bruins	6–1	Pittsburgh Penguins	Consol Energy Center	Recap
Brad Marchand (3) – 00:28; Nathan Horton (7) – 14:37; David Krejci (8) – 16:31; Brad Marchand (4) – 19:51		First period	19:26 – Brandon Sutter (2)
No scoring		Second period	No scoring
Patrice Bergeron (4) – 00:27; Johnny Boychuk (5) – 18:36		Third period	No scoring
Tuukka Rask 26 saves / 27 shots		Goalie stats	Tomas Vokoun 9 saves / 12 shots Marc-Andre Fleury 14 saves / 17 shots

June 5	Pittsburgh Penguins	1–2	2OT	Boston Bruins	TD Garden	Recap
No scoring		First period		01:42 – David Krejci (9)
Chris Kunitz (5) – 08:51		Second period		No scoring
No scoring		Third period		No scoring
No scoring		Second overtime period		15:19 – Patrice Bergeron (5)
Tomas Vokoun 38 saves / 40 shots		Goalie stats		Tuukka Rask 53 saves / 54 shots

June 7	Pittsburgh Penguins	0–1	Boston Bruins	TD Garden	Recap
No scoring		First period	No scoring
No scoring		Second period	No scoring
No scoring		Third period	05:01 – Adam McQuaid (2)
Tomas Vokoun 23 saves / 24 shots		Goalie stats	Tuukka Rask 26 saves / 26 shots

Boston won series 4–0

=== Western Conference final ===
==== (1) Chicago Blackhawks vs. (5) Los Angeles Kings ====
This was the second playoff series for these two teams. Their only previous meeting was in the 1974 Stanley Cup Quarterfinals, which Chicago won in five games. The Blackhawks won two of the three games in the regular season series. The Chicago Blackhawks made it to their third Conference finals since 2009, while the Los Angeles Kings were making their second straight appearance.

The Blackhawks defeated the Kings in five games by extending Los Angeles' road playoff losing streak to six, and they gave the Kings their first home playoff loss in game four. Patrick Sharp and Marian Hossa scored back-to-back goals in their 2–1 victory in game one, Four different Chicago players scored unanswered goals in their 4–2 win in game two, forcing Los Angeles goalie Jonathan Quick to be replaced by backup Jonathan Bernier midway through the second period. Quick then made 19 out of 20 saves, and Justin Williams and Slava Voynov scored Los Angeles' two unanswered goals, in the Kings' 3–1 win in game three. But in game four, Chicago's Marian Hossa scored the game-winning goal 70 seconds into the third period to give the Blackhawks a 3–2 win. Patrick Kane then recorded a hat trick, including the game-winning goal at 11:40 of double overtime, to give Chicago a 4–3 victory in game five and advance to the Stanley Cup Final.

June 1	Los Angeles Kings	1–2	Chicago Blackhawks	United Center	Recap
Justin Williams (5) – 14:23		First period	No scoring
No scoring		Second period	12:29 – Patrick Sharp (8); 16:22 – Marian Hossa (6)
No scoring		Third period	No scoring
Jonathan Quick 34 saves / 36 shots		Goalie stats	Corey Crawford 21 saves / 22 shots

June 2	Los Angeles Kings	2–4	Chicago Blackhawks	United Center	Recap
No scoring		First period	01:56 – Andrew Shaw (4); 19:09 – Brent Seabrook (2)
Jeff Carter (6) – 18:57		Second period	07:11 – pp – Bryan Bickell (6); 09:20 – Michal Handzus (2)
Tyler Toffoli (2) – pp – 18:58		Third period	No scoring
Jonathan Quick 13 saves / 17 shots Jonathan Bernier 9 saves / 9 shots		Goalie stats	Corey Crawford 29 saves / 31 shots

June 4	Chicago Blackhawks	1–3	Los Angeles Kings	Staples Center	Recap
No scoring		First period	03:21 – Justin Williams (6)
Bryan Bickell (7) – 19:26		Second period	06:37 – Slava Voynov (5)
No scoring		Third period	19:32 – en – Dwight King (1)
Corey Crawford 25 saves / 27 shots		Goalie stats	Jonathan Quick 19 saves / 20 shots

June 6	Chicago Blackhawks	3–2	Los Angeles Kings	Staples Center	Recap
Bryan Bickell (8) – 13:16		First period	03:28 – Slava Voynov (6)
Patrick Kane (3) – 18:21		Second period	02:12 – Dustin Penner (3)
Marian Hossa (7) – 01:10		Third period	No scoring
Corey Crawford 19 saves / 21 shots		Goalie stats	Jonathan Quick 25 saves / 28 shots

June 8	Los Angeles Kings	3–4	2OT	Chicago Blackhawks	United Center	Recap
No scoring		First period		03:42 – Duncan Keith (2); 05:59 – Patrick Kane (4)
Dwight King (2) – sh – 09:28		Second period		No scoring
Anze Kopitar (3) – pp – 03:34; Mike Richards (3) – 19:50		Third period		16:08 – Patrick Kane (5)
No scoring		Second overtime period		11:40 – Patrick Kane (6)
Jonathan Quick 31 saves / 35 shots		Goalie stats		Corey Crawford 33 saves / 36 shots

Chicago won series 4–1

== Stanley Cup Final ==
This was the seventh playoff meeting between these two teams, with Boston winning five of the six previous series. They last met in the 1978 Stanley Cup Quarterfinals, where Boston won in a four-game sweep. The teams did not meet in the regular season because of the intra-conference restriction for the season because of the lockout. This was Boston's nineteenth Finals appearance. They last advanced to the Finals in 2011 where they defeated the Vancouver Canucks in seven games. This was Chicago's twelfth Finals appearance. They last advanced to the Finals in 2010, where they defeated the Philadelphia Flyers in six games. This was the first Stanley Cup Final to feature two Original Six teams since 1979.

June 12	Boston Bruins	3–4	3OT	Chicago Blackhawks	United Center	Recap
Milan Lucic (4) – 13:11		First period		No scoring
Milan Lucic (5) – 00:51		Second period		03:08 – Brandon Saad (1)
Patrice Bergeron (6) – pp – 06:09		Third period		08:00 – Dave Bolland (1); 12:14 – Johnny Oduya (3)
No scoring		Third overtime period		12:08 – Andrew Shaw (5)
Tuukka Rask 59 saves / 63 shots		Goalie stats		Corey Crawford 51 saves / 54 shots

June 15	Boston Bruins	2–1	OT	Chicago Blackhawks	United Center	Recap
No scoring		First period		11:22 – Patrick Sharp (9)
Chris Kelly (1) – 14:58		Second period		No scoring
No scoring		Third period		No scoring
Daniel Paille (3) – 13:48		First overtime period		No scoring
Tuukka Rask 33 saves / 34 shots		Goalie stats		Corey Crawford 26 saves / 28 shots

June 17	Chicago Blackhawks	0–2	Boston Bruins	TD Garden	Recap
No scoring		First period	No scoring
No scoring		Second period	02:13 – Daniel Paille (4); 14:05 – pp – Patrice Bergeron (7)
No scoring		Third period	No scoring
Corey Crawford 33 saves / 35 shots		Goalie stats	Tuukka Rask 28 saves / 28 shots

June 19	Chicago Blackhawks	6–5	OT	Boston Bruins	TD Garden	Recap
Michal Handzus (3) – sh – 06:48		First period		14:43 – pp – Rich Peverley (2)
Jonathan Toews (2) – 06:43; Patrick Kane (7) – 08:41; Marcus Kruger (3) – 15:32		Second period		14:43 – Milan Lucic (6); 17:22 – pp – Patrice Bergeron (8)
Patrick Sharp (10) – pp – 11:19		Third period		02:05 – Patrice Bergeron (9); 12:14 – Johnny Boychuk (6)
Brent Seabrook (3) – 09:51		First overtime period		No scoring
Corey Crawford 28 saves / 33 shots		Goalie stats		Tuukka Rask 41 saves / 47 shots

June 22	Boston Bruins	1–3	Chicago Blackhawks	United Center	Recap
No scoring		First period	17:27 – Patrick Kane (8)
No scoring		Second period	05:13 – Patrick Kane (9)
Zdeno Chara (3) – 03:40		Third period	19:46 – en – Dave Bolland (2)
Tuukka Rask 29 saves / 31 shots		Goalie stats	Corey Crawford 24 saves / 25 shots

June 24	Chicago Blackhawks	3–2	Boston Bruins	TD Garden	Recap
No scoring		First period	07:19 – Chris Kelly (2)
Jonathan Toews (3) – 04:24		Second period	No scoring
Bryan Bickell (9) – 18:44; Dave Bolland (3) – 19:01		Third period	12:11 – Milan Lucic (7)
Corey Crawford 23 saves / 25 shots		Goalie stats	Tuukka Rask 28 saves / 31 shots

Chicago won series 4–2

== Player statistics ==
=== Skaters ===
These are the top ten skaters based on points. If the list were to exceed ten skaters because of a tie in points, then goals will take precedence.

Player	Team	GP	G	A	Pts	+/–	PIM
David Krejci	Boston Bruins	22	9	17	26	+13	14
Patrick Kane	Chicago Blackhawks	23	9	10	19	+7	8
Nathan Horton	Boston Bruins	22	7	12	19	+20	14
Milan Lucic	Boston Bruins	22	7	12	19	+12	14
Bryan Bickell	Chicago Blackhawks	23	9	8	17	+11	14
Patrick Sharp	Chicago Blackhawks	23	10	6	16	+1	8
Marian Hossa	Chicago Blackhawks	22	7	9	16	+8	2
Evgeni Malkin	Pittsburgh Penguins	15	4	12	16	−2	26
Kris Letang	Pittsburgh Penguins	15	3	13	16	+2	8
Patrice Bergeron	Boston Bruins	22	9	6	15	+2	13

=== Goaltending ===
This is a combined table of the top five goaltenders based on goals against average and the top five goaltenders based on save percentage, with at least 420 minutes played. The table is sorted by GAA, and the criteria for inclusion are bolded.

Player	Team	GP	W	L	SA	GA	GAA	SV%	SO	TOI
Corey Crawford	Chicago Blackhawks	23	16	7	674	46	**1.84**	**.932**	1	1,503:54
Jonathan Quick	Los Angeles Kings	18	9	9	518	34	**1.86**	**.934**	3	1,099:00
Antti Niemi	San Jose Sharks	11	7	4	298	21	**1.87**	.930	0	673:07
Tuukka Rask	Boston Bruins	22	14	8	761	46	**1.88**	**.940**	3	1,465:55
Tomas Vokoun	Pittsburgh Penguins	11	6	5	345	23	**2.01**	**.933**	1	685:13
Henrik Lundqvist	New York Rangers	12	5	7	411	27	2.14	**.934**	2	756:15

== Television ==
National Canadian English-language coverage of the first three rounds of the playoffs were split between CBC and TSN. This was the fifth year of a six-year agreement in which CBC and TSN selected the rights to individual series in the first three rounds using a draft-like setup. CBC held exclusive rights to the Stanley Cup Final. French-language telecasts were broadcast on RDS and RDS2.

This marked the second year of a contract between the NHL and Comcast's NBCUniversal to air the playoffs in the United States. As part of the deal, local coverage from regional sports networks could co-exist with national broadcasts by NBC and associated channels NBC Sports Network, CNBC and NHL Network during the first round. The NBC Sports Group's family of channels gained exclusive rights to the conference semifinals and beyond.

For the first time since they started broadcasting Stanley Cup playoff games in 2006, NBC televised Saturday primetime contests in both the conference semifinals and conference final rounds instead of in the afternoon. The delayed start of the playoffs caused afternoon conflicts with NBC's coverage of the French Open, among other events in late May.

Preceded by 2012 Stanley Cup playoffs	Stanley Cup playoffs 2013	Succeeded by 2014 Stanley Cup playoffs
