= Nathan Horton =

Canadian ice hockey player (born 1985)

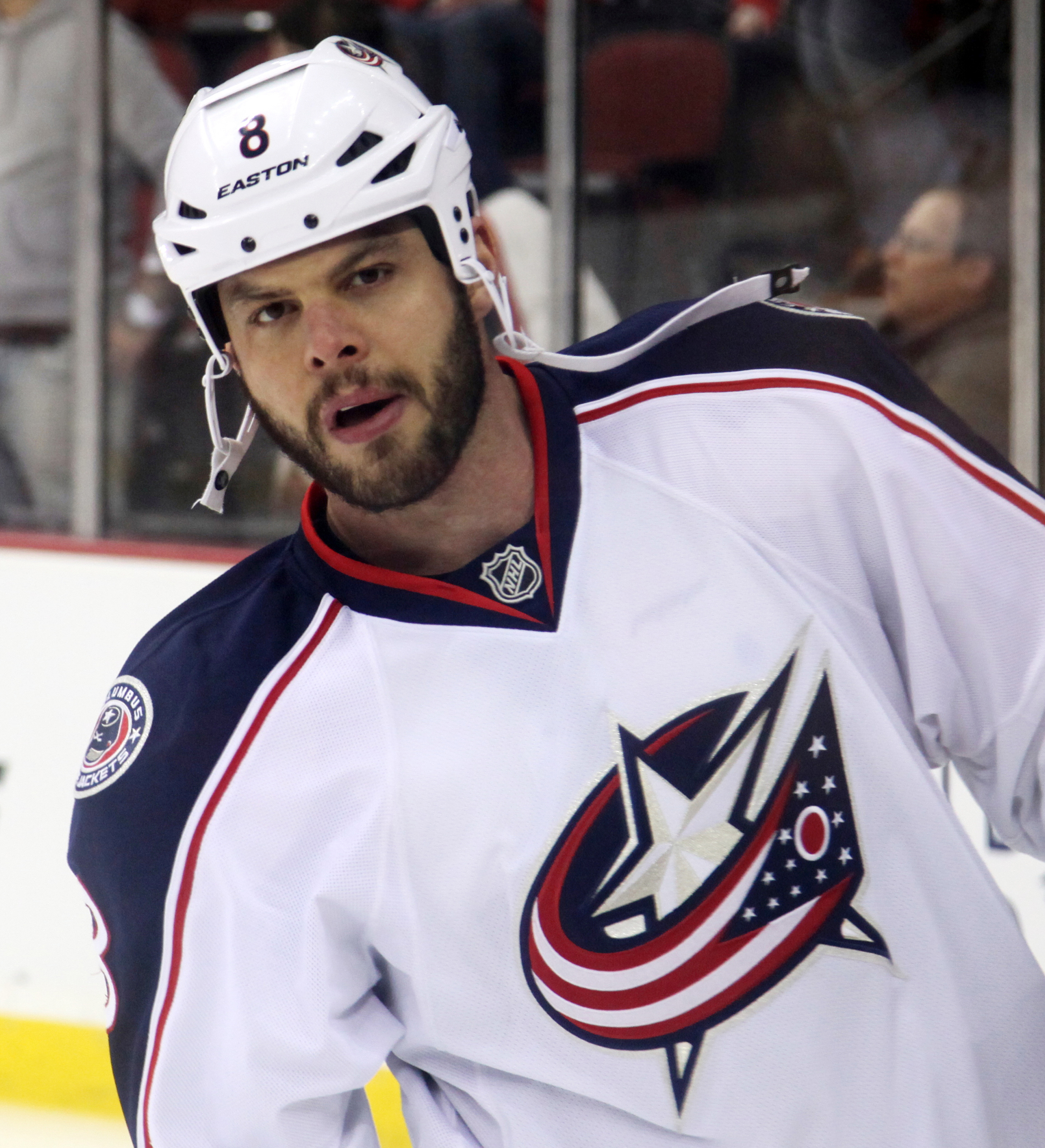
- Horton with the Columbus Blue Jackets in February 2014
- Born: May 29, 1985 (age 41) Dunnville, Ontario, Canada
- Height: 6 ft 2 in (188 cm)
- Weight: 229 lb (104 kg; 16 st 5 lb)
- Position: Right wing
- Shot: Right
- Played for: Florida Panthers; Boston Bruins; Columbus Blue Jackets
- NHL draft: 3rd overall, 2003; Florida Panthers
- Playing career: 2003–2014

Nathan Russell Horton (born May 29, 1985) is a Canadian former professional ice hockey player. During his career, Horton played for the Florida Panthers, Boston Bruins and Columbus Blue Jackets. He was drafted third overall by the Panthers in the 2003 NHL entry draft. He won the Stanley Cup in 2011 with the Bruins.

Horton's last NHL game came in April 2014 due to a back injury. Though he did not officially retire, the surgery required to fix Horton's back would have ended his career regardless.

== Playing career ==
=== Minor hockey ===
Horton grew up in Dunnville, Ontario, playing much of his minor hockey with the Welland Tigers of the OMHA South Central AAA League until his Minor Peewee year before making the move to play in the Greater Toronto Hockey League with the Toronto Red Wings. Entering his peewee season, he left the Red Wings to go play for the Thorold Blackhawks Jr. B. club of the Ontario Hockey Association (OHA)'s Golden Horseshoe League at age 13. For much of his career with Welland, Horton played up on the "'84" Tigers team with future NHLers Dan Girardi, Daniel Paille (a future Bruins teammate) and Andre Deveaux.

=== Junior career ===
Horton first entered junior hockey as a player for the Thorold Blackhawks. In one season with Thorold, he scored 16 goals and registered 31 assists in 41 games. Prior to the 2001 Ontario Hockey League Draft, a 16-year-old Horton stated that if he was drafted first overall by the Mississauga Ice Dogs, he would not report to the team. He was instead selected second overall in the draft by the Oshawa Generals. As a rookie in the OHL, Horton totaled 31 goals and 36 assists in 64 games for the Generals. During two seasons with Oshawa, Horton would score 64 goals and record 71 assists.

To begin the 2002–03 season, Horton missed 13 games out of 22 but still ended up scoring 9 goals with 18 points during that span. Horton was named to the Canadian national junior team's selection camp in December but was one of the first cuts. He ended his final season in Oshawa with 33 goals and 35 assists in 54 games.

=== 2003 NHL entry draft ===
In January 2002, Horton, along with Patrick O'Sullivan and Kevin Klein, was regarded as a top prospect from the OHL for the 2003 NHL entry draft. Eleven months later in December, Horton was called "an almost sure-fire top-five pick" by USA Today. Midway through the 2002–03 season, Horton was regarded as a top-five North American prospect by the NHL Central Scouting Bureau. Scouts likened Horton, who considered him a "power forward", to John LeClair, considered to be one of the best power forwards in the NHL. However, Horton said he saw himself to be more like Jeremy Roenick or Peter Forsberg, both of whom were faster than LeClair.

The Florida Panthers originally held the first overall pick, but traded it and the 73rd pick (used to select Daniel Carcillo) to the Pittsburgh Penguins for the third pick (Horton), the 55th pick (Stefan Meyer) and Mikael Samuelsson. Goaltender Marc-André Fleury (Pittsburgh) and centre Eric Staal (Carolina) were selected before him.

=== Florida Panthers (2003–2010) ===
Horton signed with the Panthers on October 6, 2003. After his signing, Panthers head coach Mike Keenan compared Horton to future New York Rangers Hall of Famer Mark Messier.

Against the Minnesota Wild on October 24, Horton recorded his first career point with an assist on an Ivan Novoseltsev goal. Horton recorded his first career goal on November 1 against the San Jose Sharks. In the next game for the Panthers, against the Los Angeles Kings, Horton scored his second goal in as many games. On January 9, 2004, Horton became the first rookie in NHL history to record a goal on a penalty shot, scoring against Philadelphia Flyers goaltender Jeff Hackett. Three seasons later, on October 22, 2006, Penguins rookie Jordan Staal matched the feat and surpassed Horton as the youngest player to score; Staal was 183 days younger than Horton was when he scored. Four days after his penalty shot goal, Horton suffered a torn rotator cuff and labrum which could potentially have ended his season. At the time, he was third on the Panthers with ten goals. Following an examination by surgeon Tony Miniaci, Horton was told he could rehabilitate naturally and did not require surgery on his shoulder. He returned to the Panthers in early March and scored in one of his first games back against the Tampa Bay Lightning. However, his shoulder troubles continued and it was determined that surgery was ultimately required. Horton ended his rookie campaign with 14 goals and 8 assists in 55 games.

The 2004–05 NHL season ended up being locked out which forced Horton and other players to sign with other teams. Horton eventually signed with the Panthers' American Hockey League (AHL) affiliate, the San Antonio Rampage, after a controversy ensued as to whether junior-hockey-eligible players such as Horton were obligated to return to their junior teams. Despite not signing with the Rampage until October 29, Horton still participated in their training camp. Seven minutes into his second AHL game, Horton scored his first goal of the season. He recorded his first career AHL assist on a Gregory Campbell goal. On December 3, 2004, against the Houston Aeros, Horton scored both of the Rampage's goals to help the team win in overtime.

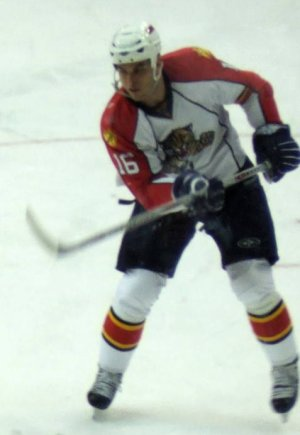
Horton with the Florida Panthers in November 2007

For the second straight season, the Panthers did not allow Horton to play for the Canadian national junior team. He and Houston Aeros defenceman Brent Burns were the only two players not allowed to play for the team. Days before the announcement Horton would not play for Team Canada, he suffered another shoulder injury which allegedly played into the Panthers' decision. Horton suffered the shoulder injury in a fight in December and missed 14 games. He was informed he would again have to undergo surgery. In 21 games for San Antonio, Horton scored five goals and recorded four assists.

Entering the 2005–06 season, Horton stated in response to a question about his shoulders: "I feel better. I feel stronger, bigger." In the season opener against the Atlanta Thrashers, Horton scored the first goal for the Panthers. Through the first games of the season, Horton was tied for the team lead in goals. On November 8, 2005, he was placed on injured reserve because of a knee injury. He was activated on December 1 and scored in his first game back against the Washington Capitals to help the Panthers win 3–2. Horton added two goals against the Chicago Blackhawks in the Panthers' next game to bring his season total to 10 in 17 games. Against the Nashville Predators on December 13, Horton recorded his first career hat-trick and stated after the game: "It's a pretty nice feeling. I felt like there was no one on me. I just tried to get it to the net and it went in every time." Despite missing ten games to injury, Horton was tied with teammate Olli Jokinen for the team lead in goals with 16 after 38 games. Against Washington on January 9, Horton and Joe Nieuwendyk scored a goal in the shootout to help the Panthers win 4–3. Two days after his shootout goal, Horton was promoted to the Panthers' first line. Despite his promotion to the first line, Horton's name was mentioned in a potential trade with the Vancouver Canucks, but nothing materialized. In a 6–2 win over the Ottawa Senators, Horton scored two goals including one on a rebound, after which he said: "It just popped right out to me. It was a long time coming for goals for me. I got lucky tonight and hopefully they keep going in." In March, Horton began playing in penalty kill situations for the first time in his career. Also against the Lightning, Horton scored the Panthers' only goal with his 27th goal of the season. Horton completed the season playing 71 games, scoring 28 goals and adding 19 assists.

Following the 2005–06 season, Horton's rookie contract expired. He was re-signed by Florida on July 12, 2006, to a one-year, $1.1 million contract. Against the Boston Bruins, Horton scored his first goal of the season to help the Panthers win 8–3. He scored his third goal of the season on October 18 in a 5–2 loss against the Washington Capitals, who the Panthers had not lost to in regulation since the 2004–05 season. After Horton was called for a second-period penalty against Atlanta, head coach Jacques Martin demoted Horton to the fourth line in an attempt to send a message to Horton. However, before long, Horton was again promoted to the first line, alongside Finnish players Olli Jokinen and Ville Peltonen, who jokingly gave Horton the name "Nathan Hortonen" in an attempt to make his name Finnish. Against the Montreal Canadiens on November 16, Horton assisted on all goals that Jokinen recorded. Against Tampa Bay on February 17, Horton scored the game-winning goal for Florida, 29 seconds into overtime.

For the second straight season, Horton's name was brought up in trade offers. However, Canadian sports writer Bruce Garrioch called it "doubtful" Horton would be traded despite Horton being unhappy playing in Florida. Against Tampa Bay on March 28, Horton scored two goals, which brought his season total for goals against the Lightning up to eight. In the Panthers' next game against the Lightning, Horton had one goal which made it nine goals and three assists for him against Tampa Bay in the 2006–07 season. The goal also gave Horton his career-high 31st goal on the season. He ended the season with 31 goals and 31 assists in 82 games.

Horton re-signed with the Panthers on June 21, 2007, to a six-year, US$24 million contract. despite previous rumours he would not. Through seven games for the Panthers to open the 2007–08 NHL season, Horton recorded three goals and three assists, during which he had a four-game point streak. Horton scored the only goal for the Panthers in a 2–1 loss against the Carolina Hurricanes on November 18. Against the Washington Capitals on November 28, Horton, along with teammates Olli Jokinen, Kamil Kreps and Stephen Weiss, scored shootout goals to help Florida win the game. For the first time since March 2007, Horton scored two goals in a game to help the Panthers win over the Atlanta Thrashers on December 28. Horton and linemate David Booth combined for three goals against the New York Islanders, of which Horton scored two. In the Panthers' 5–3 win over the Ottawa Senators on January 22, 2008, Horton recorded four assists, which was a career–high. Horton scored against Vancouver Canucks goaltender and former Panther Roberto Luongo in a shootout to help the Panthers win 4–3, giving them their first win over Vancouver since 1999. Horton scored a goal against the Washington Capitals to help Florida win 4–2 in the game after Richard Zedník suffered a neck injury in which he had his external carotid artery cut by a skate. Twenty-two seconds into overtime against the Boston Bruins on March 5, Horton scored to give the Panthers a 1–0 victory. Four days later on March 9, Horton scored again in overtime with 23 seconds left, prompting the Miami Herald to nickname him the "King of Overtime". On April 5, Horton scored his 100th career goal.

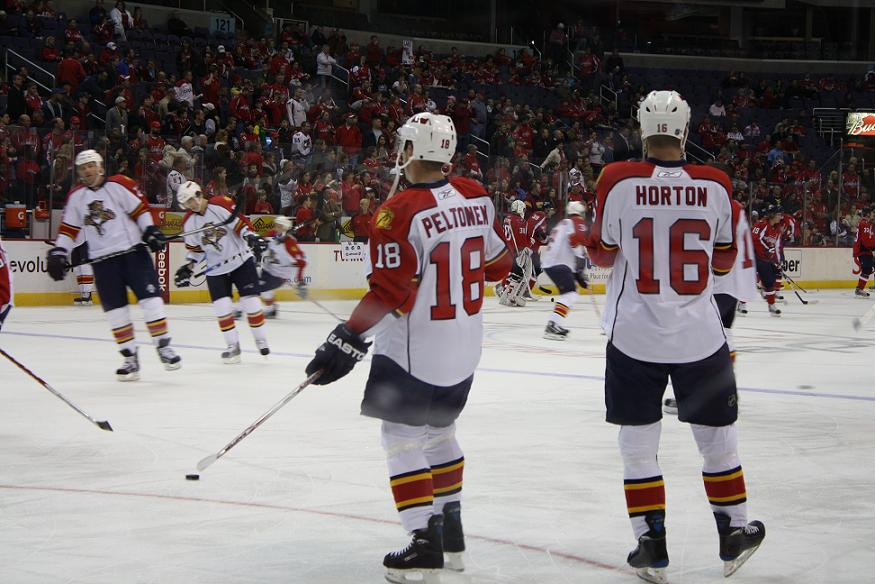
Horton standing next to teammate Ville Peltonen in February 2009

Prior to the start of the 2008–09 NHL season, Panthers head coach Peter DeBoer, who first saw Horton play at seven years old, said about his hopes for Horton: "If I'm looking for guys to do more, he wouldn't be at the top of the list. If he can give us 30-plus, I'd be happy with Nathan. There's a group of guys underneath him that I think can make a lot bigger jumps than I need out of Nathan Horton goal-wise." Horton was also moved from his position of right wing to centre before the season. After playing a few games at centre, Horton said: "It's not as easy as wing. You can play wing and all you have to concentrate on is getting the puck and shooting it. At center, you have more responsibilities." Against the Nashville Predators on November 1, Horton played in his 300th career game, but failed to record a point. On November 26, Horton suffered a deep cut in his leg after it was stepped on by a skate. At the time of the injury, Horton had six goals and seven assists. In early December, the Ottawa Sun reported that the Panthers might have been looking to trade Horton after he was reportedly unhappy playing for the team. Horton returned to the lineup on December 17 after missing eight games. After the game, Horton commented, "I'm excited to play. It's kind of a different Panthers team than the past. It's really changed in a matter of a month. Things are going good now, and everybody's really buying into what Pete has been telling us all year." On January 17, Horton recorded three assists to help the Panthers defeat Tampa Bay, 4–3. For the second time during the season, Horton's name came up in trade rumours, this time with the Chicago Blackhawks. In early March, days after the trade deadline, Horton suffered a finger injury that forced him to have surgery. He returned to the lineup on March 23, recording an assist in a Panthers loss to the Carolina Hurricanes. Horton ended the season with 22 goals and 23 assists in 67 games.

=== Boston Bruins (2010–2013) ===
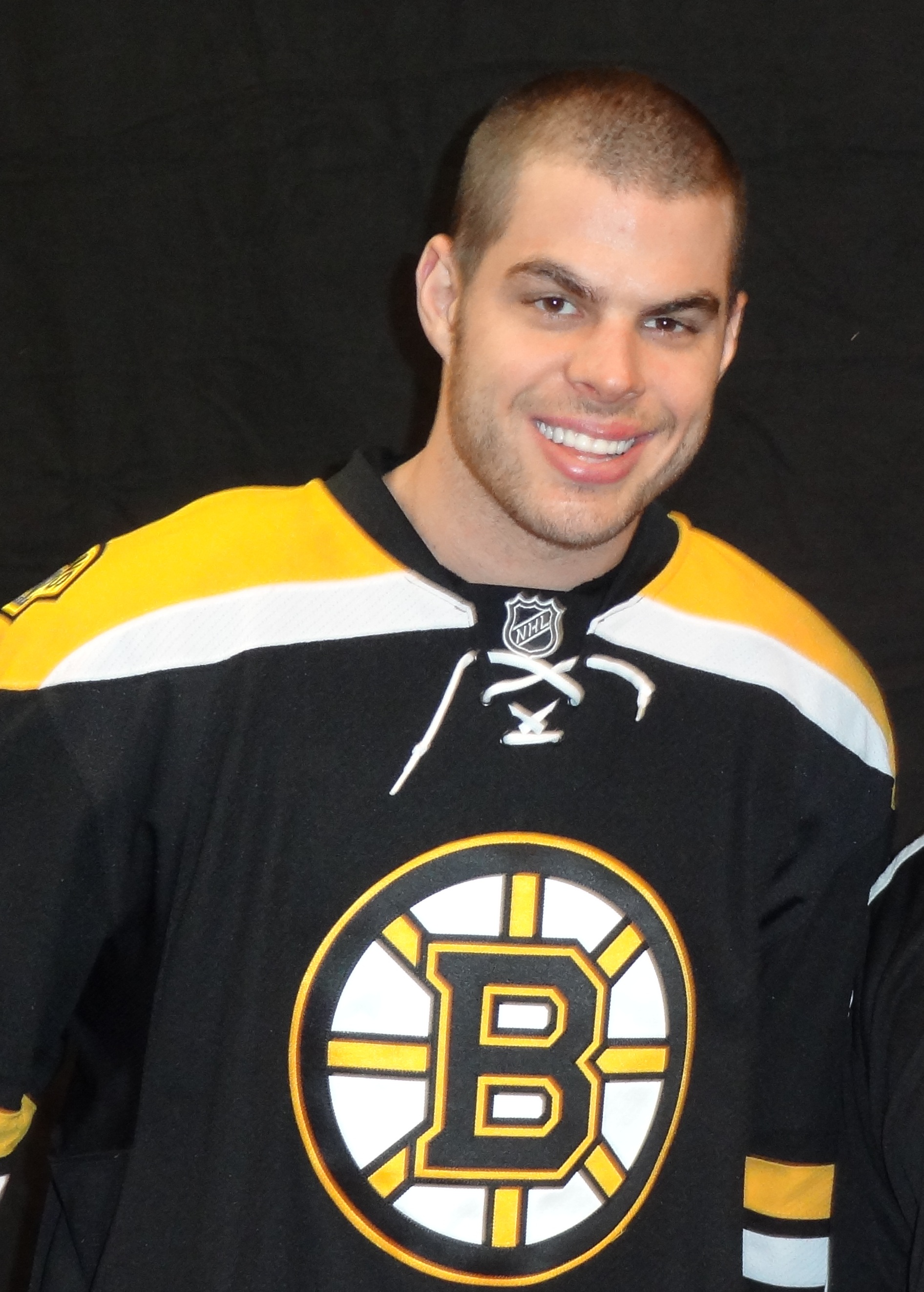
Horton with the Boston Bruins in January 2012

Horton was traded to the Boston Bruins on June 22, 2010, along with Gregory Campbell, in exchange for Dennis Wideman, the Bruins' first-round pick (15th overall) in the 2010 NHL entry draft and a third-round pick in the 2011 NHL entry draft. He got off to a great start in his first season in Boston, with seven goals and six assists, including a six-game point streak, in the first 12 games of the season. He finished second on the team in goals and fourth in assists. During the first round of the 2011 playoffs against the Montreal Canadiens, Horton scored a game-winning overtime goal for the Bruins in both games five and seven on Canadiens' goaltender Carey Price to help the Bruins win the series in seven games. A third period goal by Horton against the Tampa Bay Lightning in Eastern Conference Finals game seven, the lone goal of the game on Lightning' goaltender Dwayne Roloson, later sent the Bruins to the Stanley Cup Final. In game three of the 2011 Stanley Cup Final, Horton was seriously injured on a late hit by Vancouver Canucks defenceman Aaron Rome. Rome received a five-minute major for interference and a game misconduct. Horton was unresponsive as he was carried out on a stretcher and put into an ambulance. He was moving all his extremities in the ambulance. He was later diagnosed with a severe concussion and missed the remainder of the 2011 Stanley Cup Finals. This was arguably the turning point in the series, as the Bruins would go on to win four of the next five games and score 21 of the next 25 goals against the Presidents' Trophy-winning Canucks after the hit. Rome was suspended for four games. Although Horton missed the remainder of the finals, he was able to hoist the Stanley Cup in Vancouver on June 15 after the Bruins won game seven.

On January 22, 2012, Horton sustained another concussion, this time from Philadelphia Flyers forward Tom Sestito. Horton would not return for the remainder of the season or for the playoffs.

Horton did not play for another team during the 2012–13 NHL lockout and made his 2013 season debut for the Bruins on January 19, 2013, opening night against the New York Rangers. He ended the lockout-shortened 2012–13 season with 13 goals and nine assists for 22 points in 43 games. During the 2013 playoffs, Horton and the Bruins would go on another trip to the Stanley Cup Final, reaching that far in the playoffs for the second time in three seasons, where they would lose in six games to the Presidents' Trophy-winning Chicago Blackhawks. During the run, Horton recorded seven goals and 12 assists for 19 points in all 22 games. After the series concluded, it was revealed that Horton had been playing through the whole playoffs with a dislocated shoulder initially sustained on April 20, 2013, in a 3–2 loss to the Pittsburgh Penguins, coming in a fight with Penguins’ winger Jarome Iginla and would require surgery to repair.

On the day of the 2013 NHL entry draft, Horton's representatives confirmed he had informed Bruins general manager Peter Chiarelli he would not be re-signing with Boston.

=== Columbus Blue Jackets (2013–2014) ===
On July 5, 2013, Horton signed a seven-year free agent contract worth $37.1 million with the Columbus Blue Jackets. However, off-season shoulder surgery would sideline Horton until January 2, 2014, when he finally made his Blue Jackets debut and scored the game-winning goal in a 2–0 victory over the Phoenix Coyotes.

During the first period of a March 10, 2014 game against the Dallas Stars, Horton scored a goal to put the Blue Jackets ahead, 1–0. Shortly thereafter, Dallas Stars center (and Horton's former Bruins teammate) Rich Peverley collapsed on the bench. Play was suspended, and on April 9, 2014, the game restarted from the beginning, with the Blue Jackets leading, 1–0. Horton was unavailable for the restarted game due to an injury, but his goal from the original game was still recorded in official statistics, making him the only NHL player known to score in a game in which he did not play.

In October 2014, Horton was diagnosed with a degenerative back injury of the lumbar region. He was ruled out for the entire 2014–15 season. The injury was severe enough that his career was in jeopardy.

=== Toronto Maple Leafs ===
On February 26, 2015, with Horton on the long-term injured list and with no sign of return, he was traded due to financial considerations by the Blue Jackets to the Toronto Maple Leafs in exchange for David Clarkson. The trade allowed the Maple Leafs to get rid of Clarkson's unfavorable contract, while Horton's presence on the long-term injury list meant Toronto would not need to count his contract towards the salary cap. Horton would not play a single game for the Leafs; he failed every single physical before each season with the team.

== Personal life ==
Horton married Canadian model Tammy Plante, the great-niece of NHL goaltending great Jacques Plante, on July 7, 2007. They have three sons together.

== Career statistics ==
=== Regular season and playoffs ===
			Regular season					Playoffs
Season	Team	League	GP	G	A	Pts	PIM	GP	G	A	Pts	PIM
1998–99	Thorold Blackhawks	GHJHL	47	4	13	17	8	—	—	—	—	—
1999–2000	Welland Tigers AAA	OMHA	44	41	51	92	34	—	—	—	—	—
2000–01	Thorold Blackhawks	GHJHL	41	16	31	47	75	15	6	11	17	36
2001–02	Oshawa Generals	OHL	64	31	36	67	84	5	1	2	3	10
2002–03	Oshawa Generals	OHL	54	33	35	68	111	13	9	6	15	10
2003–04	Florida Panthers	NHL	55	14	8	22	57	—	—	—	—	—
2004–05	San Antonio Rampage	AHL	21	5	4	9	21	—	—	—	—	—
2005–06	Florida Panthers	NHL	71	28	19	47	89	—	—	—	—	—
2006–07	Florida Panthers	NHL	82	31	31	62	61	—	—	—	—	—
2007–08	Florida Panthers	NHL	82	27	35	62	85	—	—	—	—	—
2008–09	Florida Panthers	NHL	67	22	23	45	48	—	—	—	—	—
2009–10	Florida Panthers	NHL	65	20	37	57	42	—	—	—	—	—
2010–11	Boston Bruins	NHL	80	26	27	53	85	21	8	9	17	35
2011–12	Boston Bruins	NHL	46	17	15	32	54	—	—	—	—	—
2012–13	Boston Bruins	NHL	43	13	9	22	22	22	7	12	19	14
2013–14	Columbus Blue Jackets	NHL	36	5	14	19	24	—	—	—	—	—
NHL totals			627	203	218	421	567	43	15	21	36	49

=== International ===
Year	Team	Event	GP	G	A	Pts	PIM
2002	Canada Ontario	U17	6	4	7	11	10
2002	Canada	U18	5	5	2	7	43
Junior totals			11	9	9	18	53

- All statistics are from NHL.com.

== Awards ==
=== OHL ===
Award	Year
OHL All-Rookie Team	2001–02

=== NHL ===
Award	Year
Stanley Cup	2010–11

=== Boston Bruins ===
Award	Year
Named One of Top 100 Best Bruins Players of all Time.	2024

Awards and achievements
Preceded by Petr Taticek	Florida Panthers first-round draft pick 2003	Succeeded by Anthony Stewart
