= Corey Crawford =

Canadian ice hockey player (born 1984)

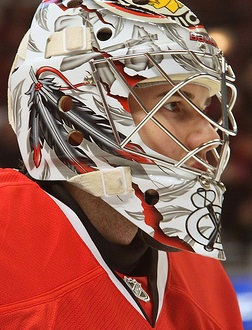
- Crawford with the Chicago Blackhawks in January 2011
- Born: December 31, 1984 (age 41) Châteauguay, Quebec, Canada
- Height: 6 ft 2 in (188 cm)
- Weight: 208 lb (94 kg; 14 st 12 lb)
- Position: Goaltender
- Caught: Left
- Played for: Chicago Blackhawks
- National team: Canada
- NHL draft: 52nd overall, 2003; Chicago Blackhawks
- Playing career: 2005–2020

Corey Crawford (born December 31, 1984) is a Canadian former professional ice hockey goaltender. Nicknamed "Crow" by teammates and fans, he played his entire professional career with the Chicago Blackhawks of the National Hockey League (NHL), who selected him in the second round, 52nd overall, of the 2003 NHL Draft. Crawford made his NHL debut for Chicago in 2006 and played with the team through the 2019–20 NHL season. He won the Stanley Cup and William M. Jennings Trophy twice with the Blackhawks in 2013 and 2015.

== Playing career ==
=== Junior ===
Crawford was drafted 52nd overall in the 2003 NHL entry draft by the Chicago Blackhawks. He spent his pre-junior career playing for the Midget AAA Gatineau Intrépides, before spending his junior career with the Moncton Wildcats of the Quebec Major Junior Hockey League (QMJHL). Crawford was the goaltender for the Wildcats in the 2003–04 QMJHL playoffs, when they ousted the Rimouski Océanic in the semi-finals to advance to the President's Cup final, but lost that series to the Gatineau Olympiques. Crawford currently holds the Wildcats record for lowest goals against average (GAA) (2.47 in 2004–05), most wins (35 in 2003–04) and is tied with Simon Lajeunesse for most shutouts in a season (six in 2004–05). He was twice named to the QMJHL's Second All-Star team (2003–04, 2004–05). The Wildcats retired Crawford's No. 29 on November 24, 2023.

=== Chicago Blackhawks (2005–2020) ===
==== Career beginnings (2005–2009) ====
Crawford spent the first five years of his professional career in the American Hockey League (AHL) from 2005 to 2010.

Crawford made his AHL-debut for the Norfolk Admirals, then the AHL-affiliate of the Blackhawks on October 14, 2005. After spending most of his first two professional seasons with the Admirals, Crawford spent most of the next three seasons playing for the Blackhawks new AHL-affiliate, the Rockford IceHogs. He appeared in 255 AHL games from 2005–2010, where he went 135–98–13 as a starter, with a 2.78 GAA, .908 save percentage, and eight shutouts. The IceHogs retired Crawford's No. 29 on February 12, 2024.

Crawford made his NHL debut with the Blackhawks halfway into the 2005–06 season on January 22, 2006, against the Minnesota Wild. He relieved Adam Munro in the third period, made seven saves and did not allow any goals. He recorded his first career start against the St. Louis Blues on February 2. He finished the evening with five goals allowed and 29 saves in a 6–5 shootout loss.

On February 23, 2008, Crawford was recalled to the Blackhawks after starting goaltender Nikolai Khabibulin was sidelined due to a back injury. During his brief stint with the Blackhawks, Crawford recorded his first career win and shutout in a 3–0 win against the Anaheim Ducks on March 5. Crawford also recorded a strong performance against the Detroit Red Wings, stopping 45 of 47 shots in a 3–1 loss on March 11. After playing in five games for the Blackhawks, Khabibulin was activated from the injured reserve, making Crawford no longer needed resulting in him being reassigned to Rockford for the remainder of the 2007–08 season.

The Blackhawks re-signed Crawford to a one-year deal on July 21, 2008. Crawford was recalled from the (AHL) on November 28 to take the place of Nikolai Khabibulin, who had been injured two nights earlier but didn’t play and served as a backup on the bench. After the 2008–09 season concluded, Crawford was recalled to the Blackhawks as the team's emergency goaltender for the 2009 playoffs. With starting goaltender Nikolai Khabibulin injured, Crawford made his Stanley Cup playoffs debut on May 24, 2009, in the second period of game four of the Western Conference Finals against the defending Stanley Cup champion Detroit Red Wings, replacing Cristobal Huet. He stopped six of seven shots before being replaced by Huet after the second period and the Blackhawks would go on to lose the game 6–1 for a 3–1 deficit in the series. Crawford would back up Huet for game five which saw the Blackhawks lose the game 2–1 for a 4–1 defeat in the series against the second-seeded and defending champion Red Wings.

==== Stardom, Jennings Trophy wins, Stanley Cup titles (2009–2017) ====
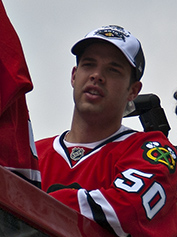
Crawford at the Blackhawks 2010 Stanley Cup parade

For the 2009–10 season, Crawford played a single game for the Blackhawks which came towards the end of the season on March 17, 2010, when he was called up from Rockford by the Blackhawks due to Cristobal Huet having the flu and he played that day against the Anaheim Ducks, which the Blackhawks were defeated 4–2. Crawford also suited up for the following game the following day against the Los Angeles Kings where the Blackhawks would clinch a 3–0 shutout win before getting sent back down to Rockford but Blackhawks head coach Joel Quenneville opted for Antti Niemi to play in the game instead and for Crawford to serve as the backup on the bench. For the 2010 playoffs, Antti Niemi backstopped the Blackhawks to their first Stanley Cup in 49 years in a six game series win against the Philadelphia Flyers in the finals. Due to playing only one game in the regular season and none in the playoffs, Crawford did not qualify to have his name engraved on the Stanley Cup but did receive a championship ring and took part in the Stanley Cup parade.

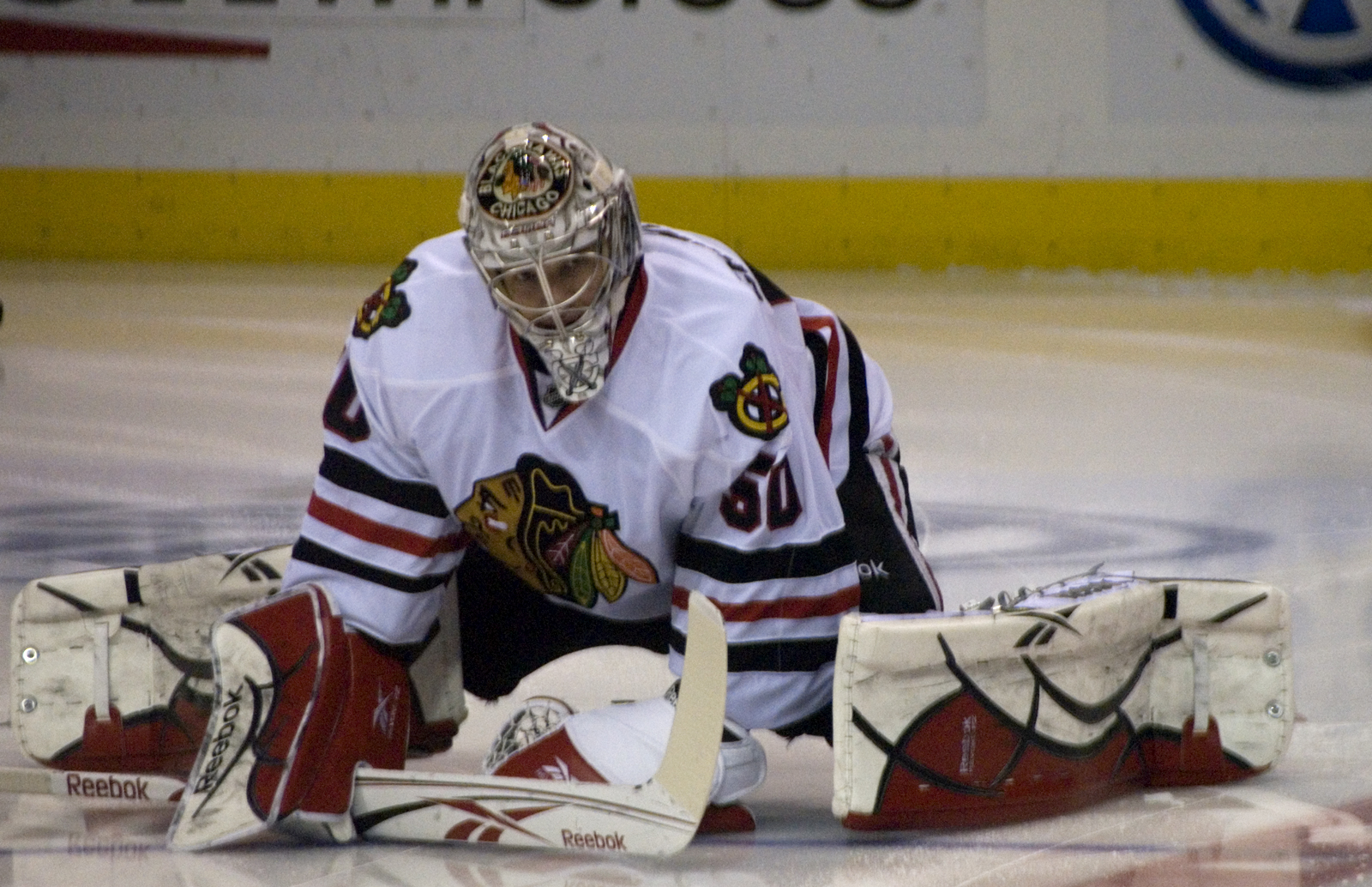
Crawford warming up before a game in February 2011

Due to the departures of starter Antti Niemi to the San Jose Sharks and Cristobal Huet to HC Fribourg-Gottéron of the Swiss National League A in the 2010 off-season, Crawford was promoted to back-up goaltender behind Marty Turco, formerly of the Dallas Stars whom the Blackhawks signed in free agency to a one-year deal. Shortly into the 2010–11 season, Crawford became the team's starting goaltender, replacing the veteran Turco. He had a two-game shutout streak later in the season (from January 7 to 15 with a 5–0 win over the New York Islanders on January 9, 2011 and a 4–0 win over the Colorado Avalanche on January 12, respectively), compiling a 176:09 shutout streak, which was the longest by a Blackhawks netminder since Tony Esposito during the 1971–72 season (from January 16 to 30, 1972). From February 20 until March 5, Crawford had an eight-game win streak, setting a new record for the longest such streak for a rookie. The streak was also one game short of the team record set by Glenn Hall. Crawford earned his 30th win of his rookie season on March 28, in a 3–2 overtime win against the Detroit Red Wings, becoming the first Blackhawks goaltender to reach the 30-win milestone since Jocelyn Thibault did it with 33 wins in 2001–02. Crawford finished the 2010–11 season, his first full season in the NHL, playing in 57 games with a 33–18–6 record, four shutout wins, 2.30 GAA and .917 save percentage as the defending Stanley Cup champion Blackhawks as a team barely qualified for the 2011 playoffs having finished as the eighth and final seed in the West. In the first round of the 2011 playoffs, his first full playoff series against the Presidents' Trophy-winning Vancouver Canucks, he recorded his first career playoff assist on April 19, in game four in a Blackhawks 7–2 win on a goal scored by Brian Campbell becoming the first Blackhawks goaltender since Dominik Hašek in 1991 to record an assist in a playoff game. In game five on April 21, he recorded a 36-save shutout, marking the first time he recorded a shutout in the Stanley Cup playoffs, and the Blackhawks' largest margin of victory (5–0) in franchise history in a playoff game. In game five, Crawford also added another rare assist on a goal scored by Marián Hossa. After recovering from a 3–0 series deficit to force a game seven, the Blackhawks ultimately lost game seven to the Canucks 2–1 in overtime and the series 4–3 on April 26 when Canucks forward Alexandre Burrows scored the game and series-winning goal for Vancouver in the overtime period.

On May 19, 2011, Crawford signed a three-year, $8 million contract extension with the Blackhawks. After the 2010–11 season, he was named to the NHL All-Star Rookie Team. After Crawford entered the 2011–12 season strong, but later struggled as the season went on and was benched multiple times in favour of veteran backup Ray Emery (who signed with the Blackhawks in free agency to fill the void left by Turco’s free agency departure in the 2011 off-season) playing through long stretches of games as a result. However, Emery could not solidify his hold on the starter's role and Crawford reclaimed the team's starting goaltender position. After going 8–1–2 over his last 11 games, Crawford was confirmed as the starter for the Blackhawks heading into the 2012 playoffs, where the Blackhawks lost in the first round for the second consecutive year, this time to the third-seeded Phoenix Coyotes in six games. In all, Crawford finished his second full season playing in 57 games and posting a 30–17–7 record with a .903 save percentage and 2.72 GAA as the Blackhawks finished the season as the sixth seed in the Western Conference. He became the first Blackhawks goaltender to win at least 30 games in back-to-back seasons since Ed Belfour did it in the 1992–93 and 1993–94 seasons.

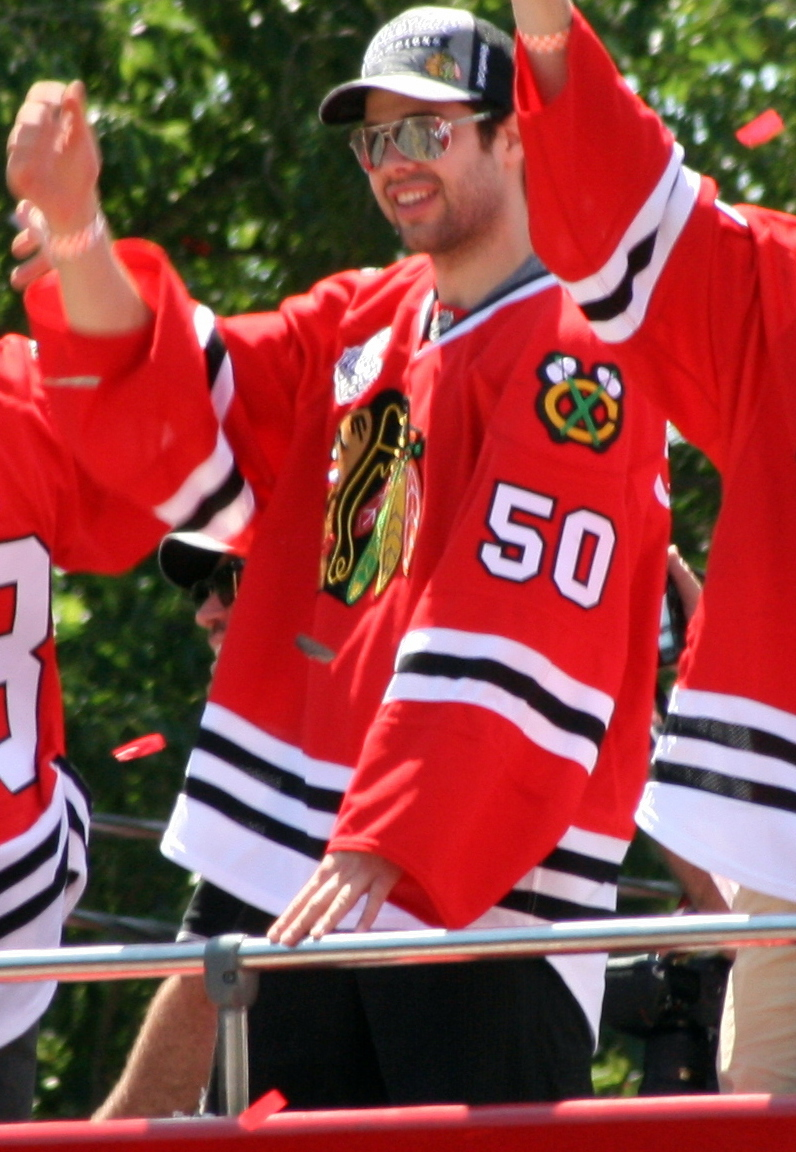
Crawford during the Blackhawks 2013 Stanley Cup parade

Entering the lock-out-shortened 2012–13 season, the team re-signed Emery to give him a push for continuing the starting job. The Blackhawks started off the abbreviated 48-game season with a point streak of 24 consecutive games (21–0–3), with Crawford getting off to a strong 11–0–3 start before struggling in a loss on to the Colorado Avalanche on March 8, 2013, in which he was pulled midway through the game in favor of Emery after allowing three goals on 16 shots as the Blackhawks would go on to lose the game 6–2. He finished the season with a record of 19–5–5 in 30 games, with a 1.94 GAA, and a .926 save percentage with three shutouts. Due to his efforts, he was awarded the William M. Jennings Trophy along with Emery, who finished with a 1.94 GAA as well. After helping the Blackhawks win the Presidents' Trophy as the regular season champions, Crawford was confirmed as the starter for the 2013 playoffs and started every game as Chicago eventually won the Stanley Cup, prevailing over the eighth-seeded Minnesota Wild in five games, seventh-seeded Detroit Red Wings in seven games (recovering from a 3–1 series deficit in the process) and the fifth-seeded and defending Stanley Cup champions Los Angeles Kings in five games in the first three rounds and eventually defeating the fourth-seeded Boston Bruins in six games. He ended the playoffs with a 16–7 record, 1.84 GAA and a .932 save percentage. During the playoffs, Crawford was named a potential candidate for the Conn Smythe Trophy as the playoff MVP until it eventually went to teammate Patrick Kane.

On September 2, 2013, Crawford signed a six-year, $36 million contract extension with the Blackhawks through the 2019–20 season. On December 8, Crawford sustained a groin injury in a game against the Florida Panthers after sticking his right leg pad out to make a save on a shot attempt by Panthers' forward Marcel Goc and would leave the game with back-up rookie goaltender Antti Raanta for the rest of the game which the Blackhawks defeated the Panthers 6–2. Crawford would miss the next eight games before returning on January 2, 2014, in a 3–2 overtime loss to the New York Islanders. Crawford would finish the 2013–14 season with a 32–16–10 record, .917 save percentage and 2.26 GAA in 59 games played while the defending Stanley Cup champion Blackhawks as a team, finished the fifth seed in the West. During the 2014 playoffs, Crawford and the Blackhawks would make another deep playoff run as the defending Stanley Cup champions by defeating the fourth-seeded St. Louis Blues in six games in round one and the seventh-seeded Minnesota Wild in the second round in six games before losing in the Western Conference Finals to the sixth-seeded and eventual Stanley Cup champion Los Angeles Kings in seven games, one win short from a second consecutive appearance in the Stanley Cup Finals.

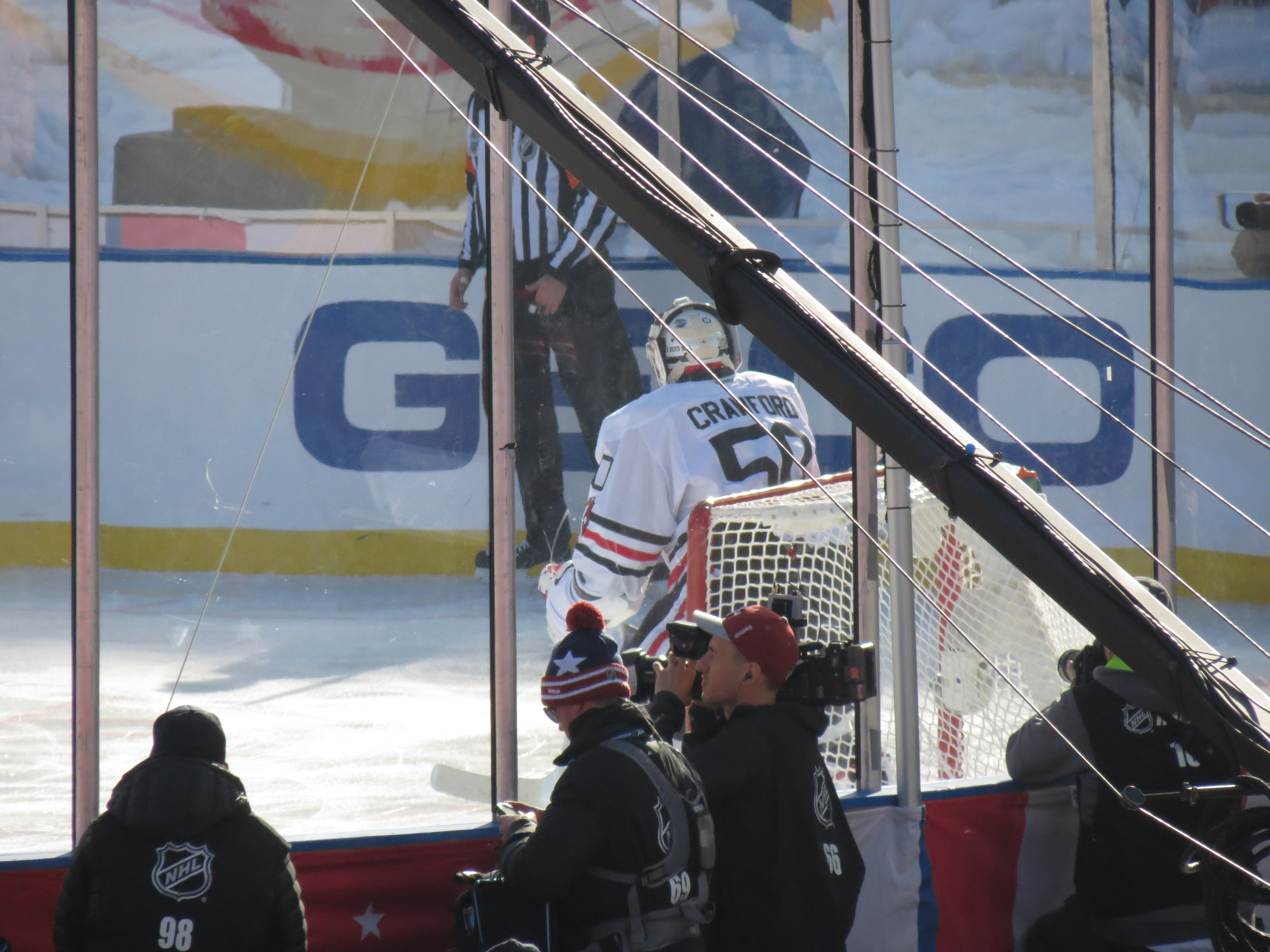
Crawford in action at the 2015 NHL Winter Classic

Crawford started the 2014–15 season with a 12–5–1 record. He injured his foot, however, on December 1, 2014, while leaving a Rise Against concert. Due to this, Crawford was expected to miss two-to-three weeks. Crawford returned to action on December 20, in a 3–2 SO loss to the Columbus Blue Jackets. He was selected to play in his first All-Star game at the 2015 NHL All-Star Game, becoming one of six players selected via fan-vote. On March 23, 2015, Crawford became the fourth goaltender in Blackhawks franchise history to have four 30-win seasons recording his 30th win of the season that day in a 3–1 victory over the Carolina Hurricanes. Crawford and Carey Price of the Montreal Canadiens, won the William M. Jennings Trophy for the 2014–15 season. He finished the season with a 32–20–5 record, recording a 2.27 GAA, a .924 SV % and two shutouts in 57 games. After allowing nine goals in two first round playoff games against the Nashville Predators, Crawford was benched in favour of back-up rookie goaltender Scott Darling, who posted three wins and one loss against the Predators. Crawford relieved Darling in game six of the series on April 25 after the Predators scored three goals in the first period. Crawford stopped all 13 shots he faced en route to a 4–3 win to take the series 4–2. Crawford was named the starter over Darling by head coach Joel Quenneville for the second round against the Minnesota Wild. Crawford started all four games in the second round sweep over Minnesota, allowing seven goals in those four games. Crawford also performed well in the following round versus the top-seeded Anaheim Ducks, leading Chicago to a 4–3 series win after initially trailing 3–2 earlier in the series. On June 15, Crawford collected his second shutout of the 2015 playoffs in a 2–0 victory over the Tampa Bay Lightning in Game 6 of the 2015 Stanley Cup Final to give the Blackhawks a 4–2 series victory and third Stanley Cup in six seasons. The win was also the second Stanley Cup for Crawford in his career as a starting goaltender.

During the 2015–16 season, Crawford appeared in 58 games for the Blackhawks. He posted a 2.37 goals-against average (GAA), a .924 save percentage, 35 wins, and seven shutouts. On March 17, 2016, The Blackhawks announced that Crawford would miss indefinite amount of time due to an unspecified upper-body injury. Crawford ultimately returned to action for the season finale on April 9, in a 5–4 overtime loss to the Columbus Blue Jackets. Crawford finished the year with a career high 35 wins and tied his career high save percentage at .924 and was fifth in the Vezina Trophy votings. He also had a career high seven shutouts, which also led the NHL among goaltenders. He broke Tony Esposito's franchise playoff record for wins, with his 46th playoff win after stopping 29 shots in a 3–2 Game 2 first round victory over the St. Louis Blues. The defending Stanley Cup champion Blackhawks would eventually be eliminated from the 2016 playoffs by the Blues in seven games.

Crawford underwent emergency appendectomy surgery on December 3, 2016, in Philadelphia on the morning before a road game against the Philadelphia Flyers. He returned to the Blackhawks lineup in their game at home against the Colorado Avalanche on December 23. Crawford was selected to play 2017 NHL All-Star Game for the second All-Star game of his career. Crawford finished the 2016–17 season with a 32–18–4 record, while recording a 2.55 GAA and a .918 save percentage in 55 games played. The Blackhawks won the Central Division and Western Conference, but were swept by the eighth-seeded Nashville Predators in the first round of the 2017 playoffs.

==== Later seasons in Chicago (2017–2020) ====
Crawford started the 2017–18 season ranking seventh in the NHL with a 2.29 GAA and fourth with a .930 save percentage in 21 appearances. On December 1, 2017, the Blackhawks placed Crawford on IR after he sustained a lower-body injury the previous night in a 4–3 overtime loss to the Dallas Stars. Crawford returned on December 10 in a 3–1 win against the Arizona Coyotes after missing three games, but sustained an undisclosed upper-body injury after playing in seven games. The Blackhawks eventually revealed that Crawford suffered a concussion and would be out indefinitely, but were hopeful that he could return before the end of the season for a playoff push. However, the Blackhawks fell into last place in the Central Division, and were eliminated from playoff contention in mid-March. The Blackhawks left Crawford on the long term injured reserve for the remainder of the season and the Blackhawks missed the playoffs for the first time since 2008 after finishing the season 19 points out of a playoff spot.

After missing 52 games including the first five of the 2018–19 season, Crawford returned to the Blackhawks on October 18, 2018 in a 4–1 loss to the Arizona Coyotes. He collected his first win of the season on October 20, in a 4–1 victory over the Columbus Blue Jackets. Crawford suffered another concussion on December 16 after San Jose Sharks forward Evander Kane shoved teammate Dylan Strome into him, causing him to smack the back of his head on the goal post. The Blackhawks placed Crawford on IR again. Crawford recorded a .902 save percentage and 3.28 GAA up to that point in the season. On February 25, 2019, The Blackhawks activated Crawford from IR after missing 28 games. His strongest performance of the season came on March 16, when made a career-high 48 saves en route to a 2–0 win against his hometown team, the Montreal Canadiens. Crawford posted a 7–4–3 record in his next 15 starts and finished the 2018–19 season with a 14–18–5 record, a .908 save percentage and 2.77 goals against average. Crawford missed the Blackhawks' season finale on April 6 against the Nashville Predators after sustaining a groin injury during the team's penultimate game the previous day against the Dallas Stars. For the first time in his career, Crawford was named the Blackhawks nominee for the Bill Masterton Memorial Trophy, the award given to the player who exemplifies the best qualities of perseverance, sportsmanship and dedication to the game of hockey but didn't make the final three by the NHL.

Prior to the 2019–20 season, the Blackhawks signed goaltender Robin Lehner to a one-year deal. Lehner and Crawford shared the crease throughout the season until the Blackhawks dealt Lehner to the Vegas Golden Knights at the trade deadline in late February 2020. Crawford started the remaining 10 games of the season before the last three weeks would get cancelled due to the restrictions surrounding the COVID-19 pandemic. He finished the season with a 16–20–3, a .917 save percentage, 2.77 GAA, and one shutout. Although he didn't make the final three by the NHL, Crawford's healthy 2019–20 season also saw Crawford be the Blackhawks Bill Masterton Trophy nominee for the second straight season and second time in his career. Crawford was late to join the Blackhawks in preparing for the 2020 playoffs. He later revealed he was recovering from COVID-19 but returned in time for the start of the qualifying round. Crawford and the Blackhawks upset the Edmonton Oilers in the qualifying round of the playoffs, but lost to the Vegas Golden Knights in the first round in five games. Crawford started all nine games for the Blackhawks, posting a 3.31 GAA and .907 save percentage.

On October 8, 2020, Blackhawks general manager Stan Bowman announced the team would not re-sign Crawford, ending his 17-year tenure with Chicago. His 260 career wins are the third-most in Blackhawks franchise history. Crawford's 52 postseason wins are the most by any Blackhawks netminder. He is also the only Blackhawks goaltender to win multiple Stanley Cup championships.

==== Retirement ====
On October 9, 2020, Crawford signed a two-year $7.8 million contract with the New Jersey Devils. He missed multiple days of the team's subsequent training camp due to "maintenance" or "personal reasons". On January 8, 2021, the Devils announced Crawford would take an indefinite leave of absence. The following day, Crawford announced his retirement from professional hockey without playing any games for the Devils. He later attributed his decision to retire due to his on-going struggles with concussions he sustained throughout the later years of his career. In a February 2024 interview with The Athletic, Crawford explained, "It was definitely tough to end the way I did playing hockey, but it was the right choice for me. I was on a bunch of medications, benzos that I took, that they prescribed me. I was taking that all day for a while. It got to the point for my mental health I needed to stop playing and get back to being myself."

== Personal life ==
A native of Châteauguay, Quebec, Crawford speaks both French and English fluently.

He and his wife have three children.

Crawford is also interested in collecting and restoring vintage cars. His collection includes a 1969 Chevelle and a 1969 Camaro. Crawford previously purchased and restored a 1970 Chevelle, which he donated to the Blackhawks Foundation. The car was auctioned for more than $200,000.

== Career statistics ==
=== Regular season and playoffs ===
			Regular season									Playoffs
Season	Team	League	GP	W	L	T/OT	MIN	GA	SO	GAA	SV%	GP	W	L	MIN	GA	SO	GAA	SV%
2000–01	Gatineau Intrépides	QAAA	21	17	3	1	1,260	40	2	1.92	—	—	—	—	—	—	—	—	—
2001–02	Moncton Wildcats	QMJHL	38	9	20	3	1,863	116	1	3.74	.889	—	—	—	—	—	—	—	—
2002–03	Moncton Wildcats	QMJHL	50	24	17	6	2,855	130	2	2.73	.915	6	2	3	303	20	0	3.97	.890
2003–04	Moncton Wildcats	QMJHL	54	35	15	3	3,019	132	2	2.62	.919	20	13	6	1,170	42	0	2.15	.940
2004–05	Moncton Wildcats	QMJHL	51	28	16	6	2,942	121	6	2.47	.920	12	6	6	725	33	1	2.73	.918
2005–06	Norfolk Admirals	AHL	48	22	23	0	2,734	134	1	2.94	.898	1	0	1	17	1	0	3.49	.750
2005–06	Chicago Blackhawks	NHL	2	0	0	1	86	5	0	3.48	.878	—	—	—	—	—	—	—	—
2006–07	Norfolk Admirals	AHL	60	38	20	2	3,467	164	1	2.84	.909	6	2	4	363	20	0	3.31	.884
2007–08	Rockford IceHogs	AHL	55	29	17	7	3,028	143	3	2.83	.907	12	7	5	741	27	0	2.19	.924
2007–08	Chicago Blackhawks	NHL	5	1	2	0	224	8	1	2.14	.929	—	—	—	—	—	—	—	—
2008–09	Rockford IceHogs	AHL	47	22	20	3	2,686	116	2	2.59	.917	2	0	2	117	5	0	2.57	.909
2008–09	Chicago Blackhawks	NHL	—	—	—	—	—	—	—	—	—	1	0	0	16	1	0	3.75	.857
2009–10	Rockford IceHogs	AHL	43	24	16	2	2,521	112	1	2.67	.909	4	0	4	216	13	0	3.61	.871
2009–10	Chicago Blackhawks	NHL	1	0	1	0	59	3	0	3.04	.914	—	—	—	—	—	—	—	—
2010–11	Chicago Blackhawks	NHL	57	33	18	6	3,337	128	4	2.30	.917	7	3	4	435	16	1	2.21	.927
2011–12	Chicago Blackhawks	NHL	57	30	17	7	3,218	146	0	2.72	.903	6	2	4	396	17	0	2.58	.893
2012–13	Chicago Blackhawks	NHL	30	19	5	5	1,761	57	3	1.94	.926	23	16	7	1,504	46	1	1.84	.932
2013–14	Chicago Blackhawks	NHL	59	32	16	10	3,395	128	2	2.26	.917	19	11	8	1,234	52	1	2.53	.912
2014–15	Chicago Blackhawks	NHL	57	32	20	5	3,333	126	2	2.27	.924	20	13	6	1,223	47	2	2.31	.924
2015–16	Chicago Blackhawks	NHL	58	35	18	5	3,323	131	7	2.37	.924	7	3	4	448	19	0	2.54	.907
2016–17	Chicago Blackhawks	NHL	55	32	18	4	3,247	138	2	2.55	.918	4	0	4	254	12	0	2.83	.902
2017–18	Chicago Blackhawks	NHL	28	16	9	2	1,584	60	2	2.27	.929	—	—	—	—	—	—	—	—
2018–19	Chicago Blackhawks	NHL	39	14	18	5	2,213	108	2	2.93	.908	—	—	—	—	—	—	—	—
2019–20	Chicago Blackhawks	NHL	40	16	20	3	2,341	108	1	2.77	.917	9	4	5	544	30	0	3.31	.907
NHL totals			488	260	162	53	28,119	1,146	26	2.45	.918	96	52	42	5,994	240	5	2.38	.918

Medal record

Representing Canada

Men's ice hockey

World Cup
Gold medal – first place	2016 Toronto	

=== International ===
Year	Team	Event	Result	GP	W	L	MIN	SV%	GA	SO	GAA
2016	Canada	WCH	1st place, gold medalist(s)	1	1	0	60	.950	1	0	1.00
Senior totals				1	1	0	60	.950	1	0	1.00

== Awards and achievements ==
Award	Year	Ref
QMJHL
Second All-Star Team	2004, 2005	
Telus Defensive Player of the Year	2004	
NHL
All-Rookie Team	2011	
All-Star Game	2015, 2017	
Stanley Cup champion	2013, 2015	
William M. Jennings Trophy	2013, (Note: Shared with Ray Emery.) 2015 (Note: Shared with Carey Price.)	

== Notes ==
Awards and achievements
Preceded by Brian Elliott; Jaroslav Halák	William M. Jennings Trophy; 2013; With: Ray Emery	Succeeded by Jonathan Quick
Preceded by Jonathan Quick	William M. Jennings Trophy; 2015; With: Carey Price (tie)	Succeeded by Frederik Andersen; John Gibson
