= 2012–13 Boston Bruins season =

NHL team season

2012–13 Boston Bruins
- Eastern Conference champions
- Division: 2nd Northeast
- Conference: 4th Eastern
- 2012–13 record: 28–14–6
- Home record: 16–5–3
- Road record: 12–9–3
- Goals for: 131
- Goals against: 109

Team information
- General manager: Peter Chiarelli
- Coach: Claude Julien
- Captain: Zdeno Chara
- Alternate captains: Patrice Bergeron; Andrew Ference; Chris Kelly
- Arena: TD Garden
- Average attendance: 17,565 (100%)

Team leaders
- Goals: Brad Marchand (18)
- Assists: David Krejci (23)
- Points: Brad Marchand (36)
- Penalty minutes: Milan Lucic (75)
- Plus/minus: Patrice Bergeron (+24)
- Wins: Tuukka Rask (19)
- Goals against average: Tuukka Rask (2.00)

The 2012–13 Boston Bruins season was their 89th season for the National Hockey League (NHL) franchise that was established on November 1, 1924. The regular season was reduced from its usual 82 games to 48 due to a lockout. In the playoff, the Bruins eliminated the Pittsburgh Penguins in four games to capture the Eastern Conference championship, but lost the 2013 Stanley Cup Final to the Western Conference playoff champion Chicago Blackhawks in six games.

The Bruins also traded for veteran Jaromir Jagr for the remainder of the season and after playing a brief stint with the Dallas Stars, he made his first Stanley Cup Final since 1992 with the Pittsburgh Penguins, coincidentally it was also against the Blackhawks.

== Off-season ==
On June 3, 2012, it was announced that goaltender Tim Thomas was planning on taking a year off from hockey. Thomas had continued to make headlines for things outside of hockey, mainly his political views, which he demonstrated by boycotting the Bruins Stanley Cup visit to the White House and posting on his Facebook page. He was traded to the New York Islanders on February 7, 2013. Like the rest of the teams in the NHL, the Boston Bruins had their season delayed and shortened by the 2012–13 NHL lockout. The Bruins traded Benoit Pouliot in the off-season and lost four other players to free-agency, but otherwise kept the team intact.

== Standings ==
Northeast Division
Pos	Team	GP	W	L	OTL	ROW	GF	GA	GD	Pts
1	y – Montreal Canadiens	48	29	14	5	26	149	126	+23	63
2	x – Boston Bruins	48	28	14	6	24	131	109	+22	62
3	x – Toronto Maple Leafs	48	26	17	5	26	145	133	+12	57
4	x – Ottawa Senators	48	25	17	6	21	116	104	+12	56
5	Buffalo Sabres	48	21	21	6	14	125	143	−18	48

Source: National Hockey League
x – Clinched playoff spot; y – Clinched division

Eastern Conference
Pos	Div	Team	GP	W	L	OTL	ROW	GF	GA	GD	Pts
1	AT	z – Pittsburgh Penguins	48	36	12	0	33	165	119	+46	72
2	NE	y – Montreal Canadiens	48	29	14	5	26	149	126	+23	63
3	SE	y – Washington Capitals	48	27	18	3	24	149	130	+19	57
4	NE	x – Boston Bruins	48	28	14	6	24	131	109	+22	62
5	NE	x – Toronto Maple Leafs	48	26	17	5	26	145	133	+12	57
6	AT	x – New York Rangers	48	26	18	4	22	130	112	+18	56
7	NE	x – Ottawa Senators	48	25	17	6	21	116	104	+12	56
8	AT	x – New York Islanders	48	24	17	7	20	139	139	0	55
9	SE	Winnipeg Jets	48	24	21	3	22	128	144	−16	51
10	AT	Philadelphia Flyers	48	23	22	3	22	133	141	−8	49
11	AT	New Jersey Devils	48	19	19	10	17	112	129	−17	48
12	NE	Buffalo Sabres	48	21	21	6	14	115	143	−28	48
13	SE	Carolina Hurricanes	48	19	25	4	18	128	160	−32	42
14	SE	Tampa Bay Lightning	48	18	26	4	17	148	150	−2	40
15	SE	Florida Panthers	48	15	27	6	12	112	171	−59	36

Source: National Hockey League
x – Clinched playoff spot; y – Clinched division; z – Clinched conference

== Schedule and results ==
=== Regular season ===
The Bruins had the fewest power-play opportunities in the NHL during the regular season, with just 122, and scored the fewest power-play goals, with 18.

The Bruins were not shut-out in any of their 48 regular-season games.

2012–13 game log

January: 5–1–1 (Home: 4–1–0; Road: 1–0–1)
#	Date	Visitor	Score	Home	OT	Decision	Attendance	Record	Pts	Recap
1	January 19	New York Rangers	1–3	Boston Bruins		Tuukka Rask	17,565	1–0–0	2
2	January 21	Winnipeg Jets	1–2	Boston Bruins	SO	Tuukka Rask	17,565	2–0–0	4
3	January 23	Boston Bruins	3–4	New York Rangers	OT	Tuukka Rask	17,200	2–0–1	5
4	January 25	New York Islanders	2–4	Boston Bruins		Tuukka Rask	17,565	3–0–1	7
5	January 28	Boston Bruins	5–3	Carolina Hurricanes		Anton Khudobin	17,190	4–0–1	9
6	January 29	New Jersey Devils	1–2	Boston Bruins	SO	Tuukka Rask	17,565	5–0–1	11
7	January 31	Buffalo Sabres	7–4	Boston Bruins		Tuukka Rask	17,565	5–1–1	11

February: 8–1–1 (Home: 1–0–1; Road: 7–1–0)
#	Date	Visitor	Score	Home	OT	Decision	Attendance	Record	Pts	Recap
8	February 2	Boston Bruins	1–0	Toronto Maple Leafs		Tuukka Rask	19,246	6–1–1	13
9	February 6	Boston Bruins	2–1	Montreal Canadiens		Tuukka Rask	21,273	7–1–1	15
–	February 9	Tampa Bay Lightning		Boston Bruins	Game rescheduled to April 25 due to a blizzard.
10	February 10	Boston Bruins	3–1	Buffalo Sabres		Anton Khudobin	18,869	8–1–1	17
11	February 12	New York Rangers	4–3	Boston Bruins	SO	Tuukka Rask	17,565	8–1–2	18
12	February 15	Boston Bruins	2–4	Buffalo Sabres		Anton Khudobin	19,070	8–2–2	18
13	February 17	Boston Bruins	3–2	Winnipeg Jets		Tuukka Rask	15,004	9–2–2	20
14	February 21	Boston Bruins	4–2	Tampa Bay Lightning		Tuukka Rask	19,204	10–2–2	22
15	February 24	Boston Bruins	4–1	Florida Panthers		Tuukka Rask	18,108	11–2–2	24
16	February 26	Boston Bruins	4–1	New York Islanders		Tuukka Rask	12,788	12–2–2	26
17	February 28	Ottawa Senators	1–2	Boston Bruins	OT	Tuukka Rask	17,565	13–2–2	28

March: 9–6–2 (Home: 6–1–1; Road: 3–5–1)
#	Date	Visitor	Score	Home	OT	Decision	Attendance	Record	Pts	Recap
18	March 2	Tampa Bay Lightning	2–3	Boston Bruins		Anton Khudobin	17,565	14–2–2	30
19	March 3	Montreal Canadiens	4–3	Boston Bruins		Tuukka Rask	17,565	14–3–2	30
20	March 5	Boston Bruins	3–4	Washington Capitals	OT	Tuukka Rask	18,506	14–3–3	31
21	March 7	Toronto Maple Leafs	2–4	Boston Bruins		Anton Khudobin	17,565	15–3–3	33
22	March 9	Philadelphia Flyers	0–3	Boston Bruins		Tuukka Rask	17,565	16–3–3	35
23	March 11	Boston Bruins	3–2	Ottawa Senators	SO	Tuukka Rask	20,256	17–3–3	37
24	March 12	Boston Bruins	2–3	Pittsburgh Penguins		Anton Khudobin	18,640	17–4–3	37
25	March 14	Florida Panthers	1–4	Boston Bruins		Tuukka Rask	17,565	18–4–3	39
26	March 16	Washington Capitals	1–4	Boston Bruins		Anton Khudobin	17,565	19–4–3	41
27	March 17	Boston Bruins	1–2	Pittsburgh Penguins		Tuukka Rask	18,659	19–5–3	41
28	March 19	Boston Bruins	1–3	Winnipeg Jets		Tuukka Rask	15,004	19–6–3	41
29	March 21	Boston Bruins	2–1	Ottawa Senators		Anton Khudobin	19,603	20–6–3	43
30	March 23	Boston Bruins	2–3	Toronto Maple Leafs		Anton Khudobin	19,236	20–7–3	43
31	March 25	Toronto Maple Leafs	2–3	Boston Bruins	SO	Tuukka Rask	17,565	21–7–3	45
32	March 27	Montreal Canadiens	6–5	Boston Bruins	SO	Tuukka Rask	17,565	21–7–4	46
33	March 30	Boston Bruins	1–3	Philadelphia Flyers		Tuukka Rask	19,997	21–8–4	46
34	March 31	Boston Bruins	2–0	Buffalo Sabres		Anton Khudobin	19,027	22–8–4	48

April: 6–6–2 (Home: 5–3–1; Road: 1–3–1)
#	Date	Visitor	Score	Home	OT	Decision	Attendance	Record	Pts	Recap
35	April 2	Ottawa Senators	2–3	Boston Bruins		Anton Khudobin	17,565	23–8–4	50
36	April 4	New Jersey Devils	0–1	Boston Bruins		Tuukka Rask	17,565	24–8–4	52
37	April 6	Boston Bruins	1–2	Montreal Canadiens		Tuukka Rask	21,273	24–9–4	52
38	April 8	Carolina Hurricanes	2–6	Boston Bruins		Tuukka Rask	17,565	25–9–4	54
39	April 10	Boston Bruins	5–4	New Jersey Devils		Anton Khudobin	17,625	26–9–4	56
40	April 11	New York Islanders	2–1	Boston Bruins		Tuukka Rask	17,565	26–10–4	56
41	April 13	Boston Bruins	2–4	Carolina Hurricanes		Tuukka Rask	18,680	26–11–4	56
–	April 15	Ottawa Senators		Boston Bruins	Game rescheduled to April 28 due to the Boston Marathon bombing.
42	April 17	Buffalo Sabres	3–2	Boston Bruins	SO	Anton Khudobin	17,565	26–11–5	57
–	April 19	Pittsburgh Penguins		Boston Bruins	Game rescheduled to April 20 due to the manhunt for the Boston Marathon bombing suspects.
43	April 20	Pittsburgh Penguins	3–2	Boston Bruins		Tuukka Rask	17,565	26–12–5	57
44	April 21	Florida Panthers	0–3	Boston Bruins		Tuukka Rask	17,565	27–12–5	59
45	April 23	Boston Bruins	2–5	Philadelphia Flyers		Anton Khudobin	19,717	27–13–5	59
46	April 25	Tampa Bay Lightning	0–2	Boston Bruins		Tuukka Rask	17,565	28–13–5	61
47	April 27	Boston Bruins	2–3	Washington Capitals	OT	Tuukka Rask	18,506	28–13–6	62
48	April 28	Ottawa Senators	4–2	Boston Bruins		Tuukka Rask	17,565	28–14–6	62

Legend: Win (2 points) Loss (0 points) Overtime/shootout loss (1 point)

=== Playoffs ===
2013 Stanley Cup Playoffs

Eastern Conference Quarter-finals vs E5 Toronto Maple Leafs: 4–3 (Home: 2–2; Road: 2–1)
#	Date	Visitor	Score	Home	OT	Boston goals	Toronto goals	Decision	Attendance	Series	Recap
1	May 1	Toronto Maple Leafs	1–4	Boston Bruins		Redden, Horton, Krejci, Boychuk	van Riemsdyk	Rask	17,565	1–0
2	May 4	Toronto Maple Leafs	4–2	Boston Bruins		Horton, Boychuk	Lupul (2), Kessel, van Riemsdyk	Rask	17,565	1–1
3	May 6	Boston Bruins	5–2	Toronto Maple Leafs		McQuaid, Peverley, Horton, Paille, Krejci	Gardiner, Kessel	Rask	19,746	2–1
4	May 8	Boston Bruins	4–3	Toronto Maple Leafs	13:06	Bergeron, Krejci (3)	Lupul, Franson, MacArthur	Rask	19,708	3–1
5	May 10	Toronto Maple Leafs	2–1	Boston Bruins		Chara	Bozak, MacArthur	Rask	17,565	3–2
6	May 12	Boston Bruins	1–2	Toronto Maple Leafs		Lucic	Phaneuf, Kessel	Rask	19,591	3–3
7	May 13	Toronto Maple Leafs	4–5	Boston Bruins	6:05	Bartkowski, Horton, Lucic, Bergeron (2)	Franson (2), Kessel, Kadri	Rask	17,565	4–3

Eastern Conference Semi-finals vs E6 New York Rangers: 4–1 (Home: 3–0; Road: 1–1)
#	Date	Visitor	Score	Home	OT	Boston goals	New York goals	Decision	Attendance	Series	Recap
1	May 16	New York Rangers	2–3	Boston Bruins	15:40	Chara, Krug, Marchand	McDonagh, Stepan	Rask	17,565	1–0
2	May 19	New York Rangers	2–5	Boston Bruins		Krug, Campbell, Boychuk, Marchand, Lucic	Callahan, Nash	Rask	17,565	2–0
3	May 21	Boston Bruins	2–1	New York Rangers		Boychuk, Paille	Pyatt	Rask	17,200	3–0
4	May 23	Boston Bruins	3–4	New York Rangers	7:03	Horton, Krug, Seguin	Hagelin, Stepan, Boyle, Kreider	Rask	17,200	3–1
5	May 25	New York Rangers	1–3	Boston Bruins		Krug, Campbell (2)	Girardi	Rask	17,565	4–1

Eastern Conference Finals vs E1 Pittsburgh Penguins: 4–0 (Home: 2–0; Road: 2–0)
#	Date	Visitor	Score	Home	OT	Boston goals	Pittsburgh goals	Decision	Attendance	Series	Recap
1	June 1	Boston Bruins	3–0	Pittsburgh Penguins		Krejci (2), Horton		Rask	18,628	1–0
2	June 3	Boston Bruins	6–1	Pittsburgh Penguins		Marchand (2), Horton, Krejci, Bergeron, Boychuk	Sutter	Rask	18,619	2–0
3	June 5	Pittsburgh Penguins	1–2	Boston Bruins	35:19	Krejci, Bergeron	Kunitz	Rask	17,565	3–0
4	June 7	Pittsburgh Penguins	0–1	Boston Bruins		McQuaid		Rask	17,565	4–0

Stanley Cup Final vs W1 Chicago Blackhawks: 2–4 (Home: 1–2; Road: 1–2)
#	Date	Visitor	Score	Home	OT	Boston goals	Chicago goals	Decision	Attendance	Series	Recap
1	June 12	Boston Bruins	3–4	Chicago Blackhawks	52:08	Lucic (2), Bergeron	Saad, Bolland, Oduya, Shaw	Rask	22,110	0–1
2	June 15	Boston Bruins	2–1	Chicago Blackhawks	13:48	Kelly, Paille	Sharp	Rask	22,154	1–1
3	June 17	Chicago Blackhawks	0–2	Boston Bruins		Paille, Bergeron		Rask	17,565	2–1
4	June 19	Chicago Blackhawks	6–5	Boston Bruins	9:51	Peverley, Lucic, Bergeron (2), Boychuk	Handzuš, Toews, Kane, Kruger, Sharp, Seabrook	Rask	17,565	2–2
5	June 22	Boston Bruins	1–3	Chicago Blackhawks		Chara	Kane (2), Bolland	Rask	22,274	2–3
6	June 24	Chicago Blackhawks	3–2	Boston Bruins		Kelly, Lucic	Toews, Bickell, Bolland	Rask	17,565	2–4

- Scorer of game-winning goal in italics

== Player statistics ==
Updated as of June 18, 2013

=== Skaters ===
Note: GP = Games played; G = Goals; A = Assists; Pts = Points; +/- = Plus–minus; PIM = Penalty minutes

Regular season

Player	GP	G	A	Pts	+/-	PIM
Brad Marchand	45	18	18	36	23	27
David Krejci	47	10	23	33	1	20
Patrice Bergeron	42	10	22	32	24	18
Tyler Seguin	48	16	16	32	23	16
Milan Lucic	46	7	20	27	8	75
Nathan Horton	43	13	9	22	1	22
Zdeno Chara	48	7	12	19	14	70
Rich Peverley	47	6	12	18	−9	16
Dennis Seidenberg	46	4	13	17	18	10
Daniel Paille	46	10	7	17	3	8
Dougie Hamilton	42	5	11	16	4	14
Andrew Ference	48	4	9	13	9	35
Gregory Campbell	48	4	9	13	2	41
Jaromir Jagr^{†}	11	2	7	9	3	2
Chris Kelly	34	3	6	9	−8	16
Shawn Thornton	45	3	4	7	1	60
Johnny Boychuk	44	1	5	6	5	12
Chris Bourque	18	1	3	4	−6	6
Adam McQuaid	32	1	3	4	0	60
Jordan Caron	17	1	2	3	1	4
Matt Bartkowski	11	0	2	2	0	6
Wade Redden^{†}	6	1	1	2	0	0
Carl Soderberg	6	0	2	2	−2	6
Torey Krug	1	0	1	1	−1	0
Kaspars Daugavins^{†}	6	0	1	1	−1	0
Tuukka Rask^{(G)}	36	0	1	1	—	0
Jamie Tardif	2	0	0	0	0	0
Ryan Spooner	4	0	0	0	0	0
Jay Pandolfo	18	0	0	0	−2	2
Aaron Johnson	10	0	0	0	0	10
Anton Khudobin^{(G)}	14	0	0	0	—	4
Lane MacDermid^{‡}	3	0	0	0	0	10
Team Totals		127	219	346	24	584

Playoffs

Player	GP	G	A	Pts	+/-	PIM
David Krejci	19	9	14	23	15	12
Nathan Horton	19	7	11	18	22	10
Brad Marchand	19	4	9	13	7	21
Milan Lucic	19	5	11	16	14	14
Patrice Bergeron	19	7	6	13	4	13
Zdeno Chara	19	2	10	12	13	20
Gregory Campbell	15	3	4	7	7	11
Jaromir Jagr	19	0	8	8	1	6
Johnny Boychuk	19	5	1	6	3	8
Torey Krug	12	4	2	6	4	0
Daniel Paille	19	4	4	8	4	0
Tyler Seguin	19	1	6	7	0	2
Shawn Thornton	19	0	4	4	3	18
Adam McQuaid	19	2	2	4	8	8
Dougie Hamilton	7	0	3	3	0	0
Matt Bartkowski	7	1	1	2	−1	4
Wade Redden	5	1	1	2	2	0
Rich Peverley	18	1	0	1	−7	12
Dennis Seidenberg	15	0	1	1	6	2
Andrew Ference	11	0	1	1	3	4
Chris Kelly	19	1	1	2	−6	15
Kaspars Daugavins	5	0	0	0	−1	2
Team Totals		50	88	138	20	163

- ^{†}Denotes player spent time with another team before joining Bruins. Stats reflect time with the Bruins only.
- ^{‡}Denotes player was traded mid-season. Stats reflect time with the Bruins only.
- ^{(G)}Denotes goaltender.
- Team PIM totals include bench infractions.

=== Goaltenders ===
Note: GPI = Games played in; MIN = Minutes played; GAA = Goals against average; W = Wins; L = Losses; OT = Overtime/shootout losses; SO = Shutouts; SA = Shots against; GA = Goals against; SV% = Save percentage

Regular season

Player	GPI	TOI	GAA	W	L	OT	SO	SA	GA	SV%
Tuukka Rask	36	2104	2.00	19	10	5	5	980	70	.929
Anton Khudobin	14	803	2.32	9	4	1	1	388	31	.920
Combined		2907	2.08	28	14	6	6	1368	101	.926

Playoffs

Player	GPI	TOI	GAA	W	L	OT	SO	SA	GA	SV%
Tuukka Rask	16	1031	1.75	12	4	1	2	527	30	.943

== Awards and records ==
=== Awards ===
On April 28, prior to the game against the Ottawa Senators, the team announced its award winners for the season.

Player	Award	Notes
Dougie Hamilton	NESN Seventh Player Award	Awarded to the player who exceeded the expectations of Bruins fans during the season.
Patrice Bergeron	Eddie Shore Award	Awarded to the player who exhibits exceptional hustle and determination.
Patrice Bergeron	Elizabeth C. Dufresne Trophy	Awarded by the Boston Chapter of the PHWA, for outstanding performance during home games.
Gregory Campbell	John P. Bucyk Award	Awarded to the Bruin with the greatest off-ice charitable contributions.
Tuukka Rask; Patrice Bergeron; Tyler Seguin	Three Star Awards	Awarded to the top performers at home over the course of the season.

Patrice Bergeron was also named Second Star of the Week on March 3, 2013.

=== Milestones ===
Regular season
Player	Milestone	Reached
Dougie Hamilton	1st career NHL assist 1st career NHL point	January 23, 2013
Brad Marchand	100th career NHL point	January 25, 2013
David Krejci	200th career NHL assist	January 29, 2013
Dougie Hamilton	1st career NHL goal	February 15, 2013
Tyler Seguin	100th career NHL point	February 26, 2013
Nathan Horton	200th career NHL assist	March 5, 2013
Daniel Paille	400th career NHL game	March 7, 2013
Rich Peverley	200th career NHL point	March 9, 2013
David Krejci	400th career NHL game	March 11, 2013
David Krejci	300th career NHL point	March 16, 2013
Brad Marchand	200th career NHL game	March 19, 2013
Nathan Horton	400th career NHL point	March 31, 2013
Chris Kelly	100th career NHL goal	April 17, 2013
Milan Lucic	400th career NHL game	April 17, 2013
Carl Soderberg	1st career NHL assist 1st career NHL point	April 21, 2013
Chris Kelly	600th career NHL game	April 23, 2013
Tyler Seguin	200th career NHL game	April 23, 2013

Dougie Hamilton, Carl Soderberg, Ryan Spooner and Jamie Tardif all made their NHL debuts during the 2013 season.

== Transactions ==
The Bruins have been involved in the following transactions during the 2012–13 season, or the off-season between the previous season and this season.

=== Trades ===
June 23, 2012	To 2012–13 Tampa Bay Lightning: Benoit Pouliot (Note: Trade of negotiating rights to.)	To Boston: Michel Ouellet; 5th-round pick in 2012
February 7, 2013	To New York Islanders: Tim Thomas	To Boston: Conditional 2nd-round pick in 2014 or 2015 (Note: Condition not satisfied.)
April 2, 2013	To Dallas Stars: Lane MacDermid; Cody Payne; Conditional 2nd-round pick in 2013 (Note: Condition satisfied.)	To Boston: Jaromir Jagr
April 3, 2013	To Chicago Blackhawks: Maxime Sauve	To Boston: Rob Flick
April 3, 2013	To St. Louis Blues: Conditional 6th-round pick in 2014	To Boston: Wade Redden

=== Free agents signed ===
Player	Former team	Contract terms
Christian Hanson	Hershey Bears	1 year, $600,000
Garnet Exelby	Grand Rapids Griffins	1 year, $600,000
Aaron Johnson	Columbus Blue Jackets	1 year, $650,000
Jay Pandolfo	New York Islanders	1 year, $600,000
Chris Casto	University of Minnesota Duluth	3 years, $2.3775 million entry-level contract
Matthew Lindblad	Dartmouth College	2 years, $1.6675 million entry-level contract

=== Free agents lost ===
Player	New team	Contract terms
Joe Corvo	Carolina Hurricanes	1 year, $2 million
Greg Zanon	Colorado Avalanche	2 years, $4.5 million
Andrew Bodnarchuk	Los Angeles Kings	1 year, $600,000
Mike Mottau	Toronto Maple Leafs	1 year, $850,000

=== Claimed via waivers ===
Player	Former team	Date claimed off waivers
Kaspars Daugavins	Ottawa Senators	March 27, 2013

=== Lost via waivers ===
Player	New team	Date claimed off waivers

=== Lost via retirement ===
Player

=== Player signings ===
Player	Date	Contract terms
Daniel Paille	June 1, 2012	3 years, $3.9 million contract extension
Chris Bourque	June 1, 2012	2 years, $1 million
Gregory Campbell	June 13, 2012	3 years, $4.8 million
Chris Kelly	July 1, 2012	4 years, $12 million
Tuukka Rask	July 1, 2012	1 year, $3.5 million
Alexander Khokhlachev	July 1, 2012	3 years, $2.4525 million entry-level contract
Lane MacDermid	July 11, 2012	1 year, $600,000
Matt Bartkowski	July 12, 2012	1 year, $660,000
Malcolm Subban	September 6, 2012	3 years, $2.775 million entry-level contract
Brad Marchand	September 7, 2012	4 years, $18 million contract extension
Tyler Seguin	September 11, 2012	6 years, $34.5 million contract extension
Milan Lucic	September 15, 2012	3 years, $18 million contract extension
Anthony Camara	March 14, 2013	3 years, $2.4525 million entry-level contract
Alexander Fallstrom	March 16, 2013	2 years, $1.455 million entry-level contract
Matt Bartkowski	March 26, 2013	1 year, $650,000 contract extension
Seth Griffith	April 9, 2013	3 years, $2.2775 million entry-level contract
Carl Soderberg	April 13, 2013	3 years, $3.025 million

== Draft picks ==
Boston Bruins' picks at the 2012 NHL entry draft, held in Pittsburgh, Pennsylvania on June 22 & 23, 2012.

Round	#	Player	Pos	Nationality	College/Junior/Club team (League)
1	24	Malcolm Subban	G	Canada	Belleville Bulls (OHL)
3	85	Matt Grzelcyk	D	United States	U.S. National Team Development Program (USHL)
5	131^{[a]}	Seth Griffith	C	Canada	London Knights (OHL)
5	145	Cody Payne	RW	Canada	Plymouth Whalers (OHL)
6	175	Matt Benning	D	Canada	Spruce Grove Saints (AJHL)
7	205	Colton Hargrove	LW	United States	Fargo Force (USHL)

Draft notes

- The Boston Bruins' second-round pick went to the Toronto Maple Leafs as the result of a February 18, 2011, trade that sent Tomas Kaberle to the Bruins in exchange for Joe Colborne, 2011 first-round pick and this conditional pick (the Bruins reached the 2011 Stanley Cup Final, winning the Cup, or if Kaberle had re-signed with Bruins after 2010–11 season).
- The Boston Bruins' fourth-round pick went to the Carolina Hurricanes as a result of a July 5, 2011, trade that sent Joe Corvo to the Bruins in exchange for this pick.
- ^{a} The Tampa Bay Lightning's fifth-round pick went to the Boston Bruins as a result of a June 23, 2012, trade that sent the rights to Benoit Pouliot to the Lightning in exchange for Michel Ouellet and this pick.

== See also ==
- 2012–13 NHL season
