= 2012–13 Ottawa Senators season =

Professional ice hockey team season of play

2012–13 Ottawa Senators
- Division: 4th Northeast
- Conference: 7th Eastern
- 2012–13 record: 25–17–6
- Home record: 15–6–3
- Road record: 10–11–3
- Goals for: 116
- Goals against: 104

Team information
- General manager: Bryan Murray
- Coach: Paul MacLean
- Captain: Daniel Alfredsson
- Alternate captains: Chris Phillips; Jason Spezza
- Arena: Scotiabank Place
- Average attendance: 19,408

Team leaders
- Goals: Kyle Turris (12)
- Assists: Sergei Gonchar (24)
- Points: Kyle Turris and Cory Conacher (29)
- Penalty minutes: Chris Neil (144)
- Plus/minus: Three-way tied with (+9)
- Wins: Craig Anderson (12)
- Goals against average: Craig Anderson (1.69)

The 2012–13 Ottawa Senators season was the 21st season of the Ottawa Senators of the National Hockey League (NHL). The regular season was reduced from its usual 82 games to 48 due to a lockout. Despite having a large number of injuries, the Senators qualified for the Stanley Cup playoffs, defeating the Montreal Canadiens in the first round before being eliminated by the Pittsburgh Penguins in the second round.

After 19 years, this season marked the end of the Daniel Alfredsson era. Before signing with the Detroit Red Wings the following season, Alfredsson has been the Senators' team captain since 1999 and is believed by many as the greatest Senator of all-time. As captain, Alfredsson led his team to 11 playoff appearances and one Stanley Cup Finals appearance in 2007.

== Off-season ==
At the 2012 NHL entry draft, the Senators selected local Orleans, Ontario, and Ottawa 67's player Cody Ceci in the first round, 15th overall. The pick was the first first-round pick of a 67's player by the team.

The Senators' roster was not changed substantially during the summer. The Senators lost forward Zenon Konopka and defencemen Filip Kuba and Matt Carkner to other teams through free agency. The team traded forward Nick Foligno to the Columbus Blue Jackets for defenceman Marc Methot to add to the defence. The team picked up winger Guillaume Latendresse and defenceman Mike Lundin through free agency, both from the Minnesota Wild. Later in the summer, the team bought-out winger Bobby Butler and he signed with the New Jersey Devils.

The team made re-signing Norris Trophy winner and potential restricted free agent Erik Karlsson a priority, and he signed a seven-year extension with the team. The team reached agreement on contract extensions with Chris Neil, Kyle Turris and Zack Smith. The club also re-signed Peter Regin, Kaspars Daugavins and Stephane Da Costa to one-year contracts.

== Pre-season ==
On Tuesday, June 19, the Ottawa Senators announced a seven-game preseason. The schedule included three road contests in Montreal, Toronto and Winnipeg. Three home contests against Toronto, Montreal and a split-squad of the New York Islanders. There will also be one neutral site game taking place in Barrie, Ontario, against the other split-squad of the New York Islanders. These games were not played due to the lockout. No pre-season games were played as part of the revised season schedule.

== Regular season ==
On June 21, the Ottawa Senators announced their 2012–13 regular season schedule. The Senators regular-season opener was to take place at the Bell Centre in Montreal against the Canadiens on Thursday, October 11. Their home-opener was to be played at Scotiabank Place on Saturday, October 13, against the Washington Capitals, with the Senators to close out their regular season at home on Saturday, April 13, against the Winnipeg Jets. However, this schedule was eventually abandoned due to the lockout. Once the lockout had been resolved, a revised schedule of 48 games was released on January 12, 2013. The Senators opened their season on January 19, 2013 in Winnipeg against the Jets. Their regular season concluded with a road game against the Boston Bruins on April 28.

2012–13 saw the Senators devastated with injuries throughout much of the season. Jason Spezza suffered a herniated disc and required back surgery, Milan Michalek underwent arthroscopic surgery on his right knee, league leading goaltender Craig Anderson injured his ankle when Chris Kreider of the New York Rangers slid into his leg, Jared Cowen had hip surgery, and Erik Karlsson had his achilles tendon cut by Pittsburgh's Matt Cooke. The play was reviewed by the NHL but no discipline or suspensions were handed out. Senators owner Eugene Melnyk commenced a private investigation into the conduct of Cooke. Despite being devastated by injury, the Senators continued to find ways to win games, earning the nickname Pesky Sens.

The Senators had solid goaltending, finishing the lockout-shortened regular season of 48 games with just 100 goals allowed (excluding four shootout goals against), the fewest in the League.

== Playoffs ==
On April 25, after a 2–1 overtime victory over the Washington Capitals, the Ottawa Senators clinched a playoff berth for the 14th time in the modern franchise's history. This would also mark the first time the team clinched in back-to-back seasons since the 2006–07 and 2007–08 seasons and the first time the Senators made the playoffs while the New Jersey Devils missed the playoffs.

After the end of the season on April 28, Ottawa finished seventh, drawing the Montreal Canadiens in the first round of the playoffs. It was the first playoff series between Montreal and Ottawa since 1928, when the original Senators were defeated by the Montreal Maroons in a two-game, total goal playoff. The Canadiens played the original Senators in the 1927 playoffs.

=== Ottawa Senators (7) vs. Montreal Canadiens (2) ===
The first game of the series was won by the Senators 4–2 in Montreal. During the game, Senators defenceman Eric Gryba checked Montreal center Lars Eller, causing a concussion and facial fractures. Gryba would be given a two-game suspension by the league for the hit. Montreal took 27 shots at Craig Anderson in the second period, and 50 overall. The Senators won the game on a three-goal third period, erasing a 2–1 deficit to win the game. Anderson lost a tooth on a shot off his mask, but continued and was named the game's first star. The 27 shots in the second against Anderson set a new playoff record by the Senators for shots allowed, and the Canadiens for shots taken.

In the second game, Montreal played without Eller and regulars Max Pacioretty and Brian Gionta. The Senators could not capitalize on the Canadiens missing the players and lost 3–1. Montreal goaltender Carey Price would be named the first star of the game. Like Anderson in the first game, Price would also lose a tooth and be named first star.

In the third game in Ottawa, Senators' rookie Jean-Gabriel Pageau scored his first NHL hat-trick; his first goal was the game-winner. On the goal, Pageau lost a tooth on a stick to the face, becoming the third consecutive first star to lose a tooth in the series. The Senators played a more physical style in the third game and focussed on wearing down the Canadiens' top defenceman P. K. Subban. Subban would be ineffective, recording more penalty minutes than playing time, before being ejected. The Senators broke the game open in the third, scoring four goals to win 6–1. After the Senators took a 4–1 lead, all players on the ice for both teams except the goaltenders fought. Eight players were ejected. The game tied or set several Senators' records: the four goals in the third period matched the record for most in a period; the two power-play goals in the period matched another record; the 16 penalties and 93 minutes taken by the Senators in the third set a new record; the 107 minutes of penalties during the game also set a new record. The margin of victory matched the highest by a Senators team in the playoffs, matching a 5–0 defeat of Toronto in the 2002 playoffs.

In game four, the teams stuck mostly to hockey: only four penalties were called, all minors. The first period was scoreless. In the second period, the Canadiens' Subban and Alex Galchenyuk scored to give the Canadiens a 2–0 lead into the third period. In the third period, the Canadiens played a tight defensive game, while the Senators pressed to equalize, out-shooting Montreal 13–4. Mika Zibanejad scored on a deflection off his skate. It was ruled on the ice and after video review to be a good goal. With 22 seconds left, and Anderson on the bench for an extra attacker, Cory Conacher scored to tie the game and force overtime. In the final seconds of the third period, Zibanejad shot on the Montreal net and the shot was deflected by Carey Price. However, on the shot Price was injured and was unable to play in overtime, his position taken by Peter Budaj. In overtime, Kyle Turris wristed a shot on net that was deflected by Canadiens' defenceman Raphael Diaz past Budaj. The goal won the game for the Senators 3–2 and the Senators took the series lead three games to one.

Two Canadiens could not play in game five at the Bell Centre: Price and Brian Gionta. The Senators scored twice in the first period before the Canadiens scored late to close the margin to 2–1 at the first intermission. The Senators restored their two-goal lead in the second on a controversial short-handed goal by Turris. Turris fell into the crease of Montreal goaltender Peter Budaj and the puck was shot on net and deflected in off Turris. It was ruled a good goal as Turris had been pushed into the net by a Montreal player. In the third period, the Senators scored three goals, finishing 6–1 and eliminating the Canadiens. For the series, the Senators did not allow a third period goal by the Canadiens in any game. It was also the first time that the Sens had won a playoff series since eliminating the Buffalo Sabres in game five of the 2007 Eastern Conference Final on May 19, 2007.

=== Ottawa Senators (7) vs. Pittsburgh Penguins (1) ===
The Penguins defeated the New York Islanders in six games to advance to the Conference Semi-final versus the Senators. The Penguins won the final two games with backup goaltender Tomas Vokoun in net, and Vokoun drew the starting goaltender assignment for the second round.

In game one, the Penguins scored two power-play goals and a short-handed goal on way to a 4–1 win on home ice. In game two, Sidney Crosby scored a hat-trick and the Penguins held off a Senators comeback to win 4–3 and go ahead in the series two games to none going to Ottawa. Game three saw the return of Jason Spezza to the Senators' lineup after a long injury layoff due to back surgery. The Penguins very nearly took a three games to none lead in the series, but gave up a last-minute short-handed goal by Daniel Alfredsson which sent the game to overtime. The game was won in the second overtime on a goal by Colin Greening, his third of the series, on a rebound of an Andre Benoit shot. The Penguins won game four in Ottawa 7–3 to put the Senators on the brink of elimination. The Penguins won the series at home in game five, winning 6–2.

== Schedule and results ==
=== Standings ===
Northeast Division
Pos	Team	GP	W	L	OTL	ROW	GF	GA	GD	Pts
1	y – Montreal Canadiens	48	29	14	5	26	149	126	+23	63
2	x – Boston Bruins	48	28	14	6	24	131	109	+22	62
3	x – Toronto Maple Leafs	48	26	17	5	26	145	133	+12	57
4	x – Ottawa Senators	48	25	17	6	21	116	104	+12	56
5	Buffalo Sabres	48	21	21	6	14	125	143	−18	48

Source: National Hockey League
x – Clinched playoff spot; y – Clinched division

Eastern Conference
Pos	Div	Team	GP	W	L	OTL	ROW	GF	GA	GD	Pts
1	AT	z – Pittsburgh Penguins	48	36	12	0	33	165	119	+46	72
2	NE	y – Montreal Canadiens	48	29	14	5	26	149	126	+23	63
3	SE	y – Washington Capitals	48	27	18	3	24	149	130	+19	57
4	NE	x – Boston Bruins	48	28	14	6	24	131	109	+22	62
5	NE	x – Toronto Maple Leafs	48	26	17	5	26	145	133	+12	57
6	AT	x – New York Rangers	48	26	18	4	22	130	112	+18	56
7	NE	x – Ottawa Senators	48	25	17	6	21	116	104	+12	56
8	AT	x – New York Islanders	48	24	17	7	20	139	139	0	55
9	SE	Winnipeg Jets	48	24	21	3	22	128	144	−16	51
10	AT	Philadelphia Flyers	48	23	22	3	22	133	141	−8	49
11	AT	New Jersey Devils	48	19	19	10	17	112	129	−17	48
12	NE	Buffalo Sabres	48	21	21	6	14	115	143	−28	48
13	SE	Carolina Hurricanes	48	19	25	4	18	128	160	−32	42
14	SE	Tampa Bay Lightning	48	18	26	4	17	148	150	−2	40
15	SE	Florida Panthers	48	15	27	6	12	112	171	−59	36

Source: National Hockey League
x – Clinched playoff spot; y – Clinched division; z – Clinched conference

=== Regular season ===
2013 regular season game log: 24–17–6 (Home: 15–6–3; Road: 9–11–3)
January (Games: 7; Home: 4; Road: 3) (Record: 5–1–1; Home: 3–0–1; Road: 2–1–0)

#	Jan	Time (ET)	Opponent	Score	Decision	Location (Attendance)	Record	Points
1	19	3:00pm	@Winnipeg	4–1	Anderson	MTS Centre (15,004)	1–0–0	2
2	21	7:30pm	Florida	4–0	Anderson	Scotiabank Place (19,952)	2–0–0	4
3	24	7:30pm	@Florida	3–1	Anderson	BankAtlantic Centre (15,634)	3–0–0	6
4	25	7:30pm	@Tampa Bay	4–6	Bishop	Tampa Bay Times Forum (19,204)	3–1–0	6
5	27	5:00pm	Pittsburgh	1–2 (SO)	Anderson	Scotiabank Place (20,081)	3–1–1	7
6	29	7:30pm	Washington	3–2	Anderson	Scotiabank Place (19,267)	4–1–1	9
7	30	7:00pm	Montreal	5–1	Anderson	Scotiabank Place (19,620)	5–1–1	11

February (Games: 14; Home: 8; Road: 6) (Record: 7–5–2; Home: 6–1–1; Road: 1–4–1)

#	Feb	Time (ET)	Opponent	Score	Decision	Location (Attendance)	Record	Points
8	1	7:00pm	@Carolina	0–1	Anderson	PNC Arena (18,680)	5–2–1	11
9	3	2:00pm	@Montreal	1–2	Anderson	Bell Centre (21,273)	5–3–1	11
10	5	7:30pm	Buffalo	4–3	Anderson	Scotiabank Place (18,345)	6–3–1	13
11	7	7:30pm	Carolina	2–3 (OT)	Anderson	Scotiabank Place (17,337)	6–3–2	14
12	9	2:00pm	Winnipeg	0–1	Bishop	Scotiabank Place (18,594)	6–4–2	14
13	12	7:30pm	Buffalo	2–0	Anderson	Scotiabank Place (18,429)	7–4–2	16
14	13	7:00pm	@Pittsburgh	2–4	Anderson	Consol Energy Center (18,637)	7–5–2	16
15	16	7:00pm	@Toronto	0–3	Anderson	Air Canada Centre (19,537)	7–6–2	16
16	18	1:00pm	@New Jersey	2–1 (SO)	Bishop	Prudential Center (17,625)	8–6–2	18
17	19	7:30pm	NY Islanders	3–1	Anderson	Scotiabank Place (18,595)	9–6–2	20
18	21	7:30pm	NY Rangers	3–2 (SO)	Bishop	Scotiabank Place (19,076)	10–6–2	22
19	23	7:00pm	Toronto	3–2	Bishop	Scotiabank Place (19,499)	11–6–2	24
20	25	7:30pm	Montreal	2–1 (SO)	Bishop	Scotiabank Place (19,210)	12–6–2	26
21	28	7:00pm	@Boston	1–2 (OT)	Lehner	TD Garden (17,565)	12–6–3	27

March (Games: 14; Home: 7; Road: 7) (Record: 7–4–3; Home: 4–2–1; Road: 3–2–2)

#	Mar	Time (ET)	Opponent	Score	Decision	Location (Attendance)	Record	Points
22	2	12:00pm	@Philadelphia	1–2	Bishop	Wells Fargo Center (19,959)	12–7–3	27
23	3	3:00pm	@NY Islanders	2–3 (SO)	Lehner	Nassau Veterans Memorial Coliseum (13,512)	12–7–4	28
24	6	7:00pm	@Toronto	4–5	Bishop	Air Canada Centre (19,412)	12–8–4	28
25	8	7:00pm	@NY Rangers	3–2	Lehner	Madison Square Garden (17,200)	13–8–4	30
26	11	7:30pm	Boston	2–3 (SO)	Lehner	Scotiabank Place (20,256)	13–8–5	31
27	13	7:00pm	@Montreal	3–4 (SO)	Lehner	Bell Centre (21,273)	13–8–6	32
28	16	3:00pm	@Buffalo	4–3 (OT)	Bishop	First Niagara Center (19,070)	14–8–6	34
29	17	5:00pm	Winnipeg	4–1	Lehner	Scotiabank Place (19,227)	15–8–6	36
30	19	7:00pm	@NY Islanders	5–3	Bishop	Nassau Veterans Memorial Coliseum (10,668)	16–8–6	38
31	21	7:30pm	Boston	1–2	Lehner	Scotiabank Place (19,603)	16–9–6	38
32	23	2:00pm	Tampa Bay	5–3	Lehner	Scotiabank Place (20,016)	17–9–6	40
33	25	7:30pm	New Jersey	3–2 (SO)	Bishop	Scotiabank Place (18,902)	18–9–6	42
34	28	7:30pm	NY Rangers	3–0	Bishop	Scotiabank Place (19,447)	19–9–6	44
35	30	7:00pm	Toronto	0–4	Bishop	Scotiabank Place (20,183)	19–10–6	44

April (Games: 13; Home: 5; Road: 8) (Record: 5–7–0; Home: 2–3–0; Road: 3–4–0)

#	Apr	Time (ET)	Opponent	Score	Decision	Location (Attendance)	Record	Points
36	2	7:00pm	@Boston	2–3	Lehner	TD Garden (17,565)	19–11–6	44
37	5	7:00pm	@Buffalo	2–4	Lehner	First Niagara Center (19,070)	19–12–6	44
38	7	6:00pm	@Florida	1–2	Anderson	BankAtlantic Center (15,634)	19–13–6	44
39	9	7:30pm	@Tampa Bay	2–3	Anderson	Tampa Bay Times Forum (17,323)	19–14–6	44
40	11	7:00pm	@Philadelphia	3–1	Lehner	Wells Fargo Center (19,598)	20–14–6	46
41	12	7:00pm	@New Jersey	2–0	Anderson	Prudential Center (16,099)	21–14–6	48
–	15	7:00pm	@Boston	Game rescheduled to April 28 due to the Boston Marathon bombing.				
42	16	7:30pm	Carolina	3–2	Anderson	Scotiabank Place (19,181)	22–14–6	50
43	18	7:30pm	Washington	3–1	Anderson	Scotiabank Place (19,965)	23–14–6	52
44	20	7:00pm	Toronto	1–4	Anderson	Scotiabank Place (20,500)	23–15–6	52
45	22	7:30pm	Pittsburgh	1–3	Anderson	Scotiabank Place (20,276)	23–16–6	52
46	25	7:00pm	@Washington	2–1 (OT)	Anderson	Verizon Center (18,506)	24–16–6	54
47	27	7:00pm	Philadelphia	1–2	Anderson	Scotiabank Place (20,232)	24–17–6	54
48	28	7:00pm	@Boston	4–2	Lehner	TD Garden (17,565)	25–17–6	56

Legend: = Win = Loss = OT/SO Loss

=== Playoffs ===
2013 Stanley Cup Playoffs
Eastern Conference Quarter-final vs E2 Montreal Canadiens: Ottawa wins series 4–1

#	Date	Visitor	Score	Home	OT	Ottawa goals	Montreal goals	Decision	Attendance	Series	Recap
1	May 2	Ottawa Senators	4–2	Montreal Canadiens		Karlsson, Silfverberg, Methot, Latendresse	Bourque, Gallagher	Anderson	21,273	1–0	
2	May 3	Ottawa Senators	1–3	Montreal Canadiens		Michalek	White, Gallagher, Ryder	Anderson	21,273	1–1	
3	May 5	Montreal Canadiens	1–6	Ottawa Senators		Alfredsson, Pageau (3), Silfverberg, Turris	Bourque	Anderson	20,249	2–1	
4	May 7	Montreal Canadiens	2–3	Ottawa Senators	OT	Zibanejad, Conacher, Turris	Subban, Galchenyuk	Anderson	20,500	3–1	
5	May 9	Ottawa Senators	6–1	Montreal Canadiens		Smith, Conacher (2), Turris, Alfredsson, Condra	Subban	Anderson	21,273	4–1	

Eastern Conference Semi-final vs E1 Pittsburgh Penguins: Pittsburgh wins series 4–1

#	Date	Visitor	Score	Home	OT	Ottawa goals	Pittsburgh goals	Decision	Attendance	Series	Recap
1	May 14	Ottawa Senators	1–4	Pittsburgh Penguins		Greening	Martin, Malkin, Kunitz, Dupuis	Anderson	18,621	0–1	
2	May 17	Ottawa Senators	3–4	Pittsburgh Penguins		Turris, Greening, Pageau	Crosby (3), Morrow	Lehner	18,645	0–2	
3	May 19	Pittsburgh Penguins	1–2	Ottawa Senators	2OT	Alfredsson, Greening	Kennedy	Anderson	20,500	1–2	
4	May 22	Pittsburgh Penguins	7–3	Ottawa Senators		Michalek, Turris, Alfredsson	Neal (2), Kunitz, Iginla (2), Dupuis, Crosby	Anderson	20,500	1–3	
5	May 24	Ottawa Senators	2–6	Pittsburgh Penguins		Michalek, Turris	Morrow, Neal (3), Letang, Malkin	Anderson	18,656	1–4	

Legend: = Win = Loss

- Scorer of game-winning goal in italics

== Player statistics ==
Final stats

Scoring

Regular season
Player	GP	G	A	Pts	+/-	PIM
Kyle Turris	48	12	17	29	6	24
Sergei Gonchar	45	3	24	27	4	26
Daniel Alfredsson	47	10	16	26	1	33
Mika Zibanejad	42	7	13	20	9	6
Jakob Silfverberg	48	10	9	19	9	12
Colin Greening	47	8	11	19	5	11
Patrick Wiercioch	42	5	14	19	9	39
Zack Smith	48	4	11	15	−9	56
Chris Phillips	48	5	9	14	−5	43
Milan Michalek	23	4	10	14	8	17
Erik Karlsson	17	6	8	14	8	8
Chris Neil	48	4	8	12	0	144
Erik Condra	48	4	8	12	3	34
Marc Methot	47	2	9	11	2	31
Andre Benoit	33	3	7	10	−3	8
Guillaume Latendresse	27	6	4	10	−2	8
Eric Gryba	33	2	4	6	−3	26
Jim O'Brien	29	5	1	6	−2	8
Jason Spezza	5	2	3	5	3	2
Cory Conacher^{†}	12	2	3	5	6	4
Jean-Gabriel Pageau	9	2	2	4	3	0
Peter Regin	27	0	3	3	−4	8
Kaspars Daugavins^{‡}	19	1	2	3	−7	9
David Dziurzynski	12	2	0	2	−1	13
Stephane Da Costa	9	1	1	2	−3	0
Mike Lundin	11	0	1	1	−2	0
Matt Kassian	15	1	0	1	0	47
Jared Cowen	7	1	0	1	1	10
Derek Grant	5	0	0	0	−1	0
Mark Borowiecki	6	0	0	0	1	18
Mike Hoffman	3	0	0	0	−1	2
Mark Stone	4	0	0	0	−1	2
Totals		112	196	308	34	649

Playoffs
Player	GP	G	A	Pts	+/-	PIM
Daniel Alfredsson	10	4	6	10	5	6
Kyle Turris	10	6	3	9	2	13
Erik Karlsson	10	1	7	8	0	6
Erik Condra	10	1	6	7	−1	2
Jean-Gabriel Pageau	10	4	2	6	4	8
Sergei Gonchar	10	0	6	6	−3	14
Milan Michalek	10	3	2	5	3	2
Marc Methot	10	1	4	5	1	6
Colin Greening	10	3	1	4	−1	2
Jakob Silfverberg	10	2	2	4	−1	2
Mika Zibanejad	10	1	3	4	−3	0
Chris Neil	10	0	4	4	0	39
Cory Conacher	8	3	0	3	−2	31
Andre Benoit	5	0	3	3	4	0
Jared Cowen	10	0	3	3	−6	21
Guillaume Latendresse	3	1	1	2	1	6
Matt Kassian	5	0	2	2	1	17
Zack Smith	10	1	1	2	−2	31
Chris Phillips	10	0	1	1	6	21
Jason Spezza	3	0	1	1	−1	0
Eric Gryba	4	0	0	0	0	17
Patrick Wiercioch	1	0	0	0	0	0
Mark Stone	1	0	0	0	0	0

Goaltenders

Regular season
Player	GP	GS	TOI	W	L	OT	GA	GAA	SA	SV%	SO	G	A	PIM
Craig Anderson	24	24	1420:36	12	9	2	40	1.69	677	.941	3	0	0	0
Ben Bishop^{‡}	13	12	758:12	8	5	0	31	2.45	399	.922	1	0	0	0
Robin Lehner	12	12	734:48	5	3	4	27	2.20	424	.936	0	0	0	0
Totals		48	2913:36	25	17	6	98	2.11	1500	.933	4	0	0	0

Playoffs
Player	GP	GS	TOI	W	L	GA	GAA	SA	SV%	SO	G	A	PIM
Craig Anderson	10	10	577:40	5	4	29	3.01	352	.918	0	0	0	0
Robin Lehner	2	0	49:24	0	1	2	2.45	25	.920	0	0	0	0
Totals		10	627:04	5	5	31	2.73	377	.919	0	0	0	0

^{†}Denotes player spent time with another team before joining the Senators. Stats reflect time with the Senators only.
^{‡}Traded mid-season
Bold/italics denotes franchise record

== Awards/milestones ==
- Molson Cup – Craig Anderson
- Jack Adams Award (coach of the year) – Paul MacLean
- Mark Messier Leadership Award – Daniel Alfredsson

== Transactions ==
=== Trades ===
Date	Details
July 1, 2012	To Columbus Blue Jackets Nick Foligno	To Ottawa Senators Marc Methot
March 12, 2013	To Minnesota Wild 6th-round pick in 2014	To Ottawa Senators Matt Kassian
April 3, 2013	To Tampa Bay Lightning Ben Bishop	To Ottawa Senators Cory Conacher; 4th-round pick in 2013
June 7, 2013	To Dallas Stars Sergei Gonchar	To Ottawa Senators Conditional 6th-round pick in 2013

=== Free agents signed ===
Player	Former team	Date	Contract terms
Guillaume Latendresse	Minnesota Wild	July 1, 2012	1-year, $2 million
Mike Lundin	Minnesota Wild	July 1, 2012	1-year, $1.15 million
Hugh Jessiman	Abbotsford Heat	July 1, 2012	1-year, $600,000
Tyler Eckford	Portland Pirates	July 10, 2012	2-year, $1.2 million
Andre Benoit	Spartak Moscow	July 13, 2012	1-year, two-way, $650,000 contract.
Nathan Lawson	Hamilton Bulldogs	July 16, 2012	1-year, $600,000 two-way contract.
Troy Rutkowski	Portland Winterhawks	March 14, 2013	3-year, $1.965 million entry-level contract.
Andrew Hammond	Bowling Green State University	March 20, 2013	2-year, $1.44 million entry-level contract.
Buddy Robinson	Lake Superior State University	March 25, 2013	3-year, $2.775 million entry-level contract.

=== Free agents lost ===
Player	New team	Contract terms
Nikita Filatov	Salavat Yulaev Ufa	One-year
Filip Kuba	Florida Panthers	Two-year, $8 million contract
Matt Carkner	New York Islanders	Three-year, $4.5 million contract
Zenon Konopka	Minnesota Wild	Two-year, $1.85 million contract
Rob Klinkhammer	Phoenix Coyotes	One-year, $650,000
Bobby Butler	New Jersey Devils	One-year, $525,000
Jesse Winchester	TuTo	One-year.

=== Claimed via waivers ===
Player	Former team	Date claimed off waivers

=== Lost via waivers ===
Player	New team	Date claimed off waivers
Kaspars Daugavins	Boston Bruins	March 27, 2013

=== Player signings ===
Player	Date	Contract terms
Peter Regin	May 4, 2012	1-year, $800,000 one-way contract
Fredrik Claesson	May 10, 2012	3-year, $1.87 million (est.) entry-level contract
Pat Cannone	May 11, 2012	2-year, $1.25 million two-way contract
Jakub Culek	May 25, 2012	3-year, $1.77 million (est.) entry-level contract
Darren Kramer	May 25, 2012	3-year, $1.8 million (est.) entry-level contract
Jean-Gabriel Pageau	June 6, 2012	3-year, $1.84 million (est.) entry-level contract
Erik Karlsson	June 19, 2012	7-year, $45.5 million
Shane Prince	July 1, 2012	3-year, $2.63 million entry-level contract
Chris Neil	July 11, 2012	3-year, $5.75 million extension
Eric Gryba	July 18, 2012	2-year, $1.125 million contract
Jim O'Brien	July 18, 2012	2-year, $1.275 million contract
Kaspars Daugavins	July 23, 2012	1-year, $635,000 contract
Stephane Da Costa	July 25, 2012	1-year, $800,000 two-way contract
Cody Ceci	August 23, 2012	3-year, $2.775 million entry-level contract
Kyle Turris	August 29, 2012	5-year, $17.5 million extension
Zack Smith	September 5, 2012	4-year, $7.55 million extension
Michael Sdao	March 15, 2013	1-year, $620,000 entry-level contract

== Draft picks ==
Ottawa Senators' picks at the 2012 NHL entry draft, held in Pittsburgh, Pennsylvania, on June 22–23, 2012.

Round	#	Player	Pos	Nationality	College/junior/club team (league)
1	15	Cody Ceci	D	Canada	Ottawa 67's (OHL)
3	76	Chris Driedger	G	Canada	Calgary Hitmen (WHL)
3	82^{[a]}	Jarrod Maidens	C/LW	Canada	Owen Sound Attack (OHL)
4	106	Timothy Boyle	D	United States	Noble and Greenough School (USHS-MA)
5	136	Robert Baillargeon	D	United States	Indiana Ice (USHL)
6	166	Francois Brassard	G	Canada	Quebec Ramparts (QMJHL)
7	196	Mikael Wikstrand	D	Sweden	Mora IK (Allsvenskan)

Draft notes

- The Senators' second-round pick went to the Phoenix Coyotes as the result of a December 17, 2011, trade that sent Kyle Turris to the Senators in exchange for David Rundblad and this pick.
- ^{a} The Nashville Predators' third-round pick went to the Senators as a result of a February 10, 2011, trade that sent Mike Fisher to the Predators in exchange for this pick.

== See also ==
- 2012–13 NHL season
