= Patrice Bergeron =

Canadian ice hockey player (born 1985)

- Hockey Hall of Fame, 2026
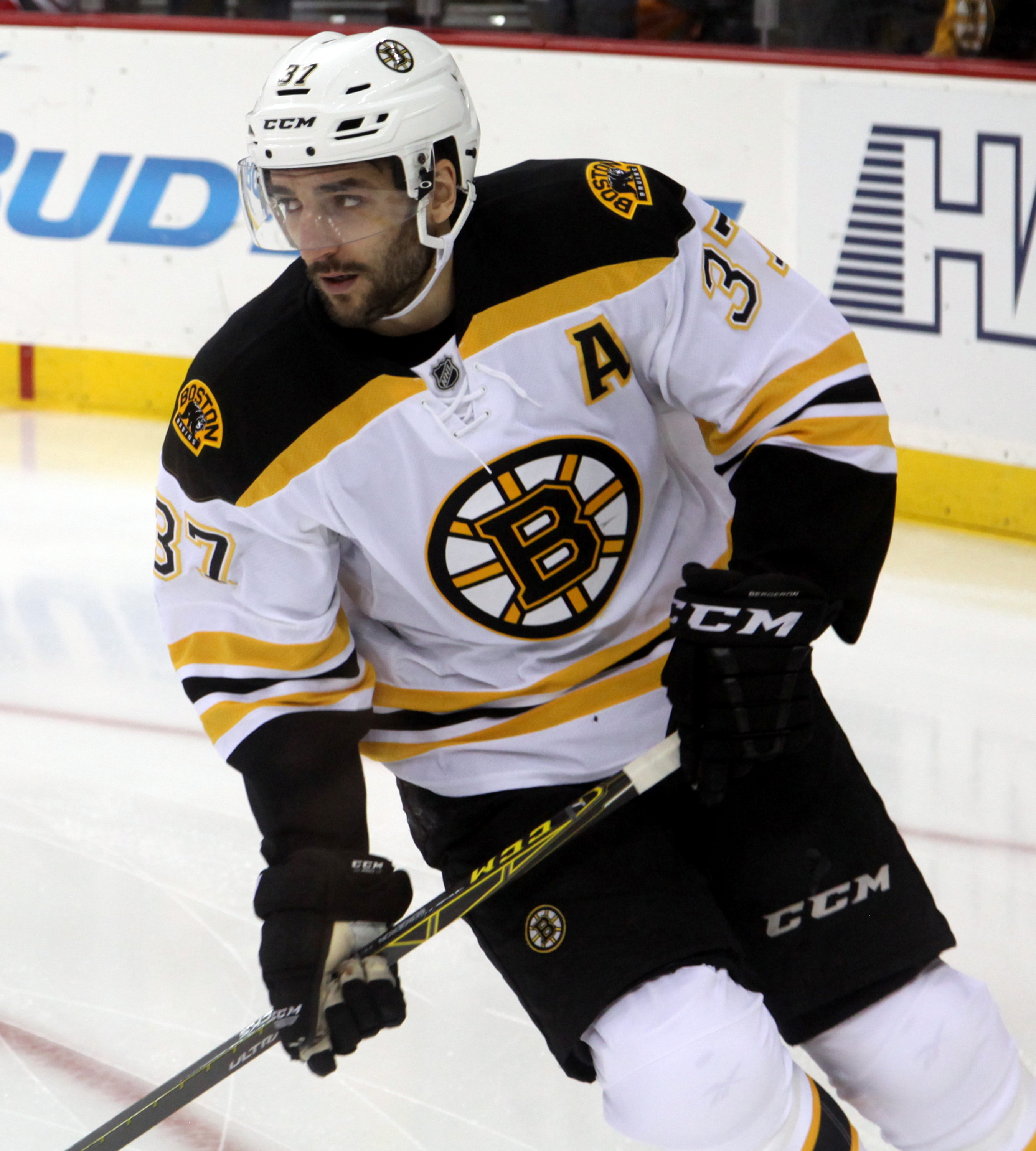
- Bergeron with the Boston Bruins in 2016
- Born: July 24, 1985 (age 41) L'Ancienne-Lorette, Quebec, Canada
- Height: 6 ft 1 in (185 cm)
- Weight: 195 lb (88 kg; 13 st 13 lb)
- Position: Centre
- Shot: Right
- Played for: Boston Bruins; HC Lugano
- National team: Canada
- NHL draft: 45th overall, 2003; Boston Bruins
- Playing career: 2003–2023

Patrice Bergeron-Cleary (born July 24, 1985) is a Canadian former professional ice hockey centre who played 19 seasons in the National Hockey League (NHL), all with the Boston Bruins. He served as team captain from 2021 until his retirement in 2023. Bergeron played junior hockey with the Acadie–Bathurst Titan of the Quebec Major Junior Hockey League (QMJHL) for one full season before being selected 45th overall by the Bruins in the 2003 NHL entry draft. He made the immediate jump from junior to the NHL after his draft and joined the Bruins in the 2003–04 season. In international play, Bergeron competed for Canada and won gold medals at the 2004 World Championships, 2005 World Junior Championships, 2010 Winter Olympics, 2012 Spengler Cup, and 2014 Winter Olympics. Bergeron is a member of the Triple Gold Club after winning the Stanley Cup with Boston in 2011. He scored two goals, including the Stanley Cup-winning goal, in game seven against the Vancouver Canucks.

Known for his two-way abilities, Bergeron is a six-time winner of the Frank J. Selke Trophy, awarded annually to the NHL forward with the best defensive skills, the most in NHL history. His 12 nominations are also an NHL record. He is regarded as one of the premier two-way forwards in NHL history. He was inducted into the IIHF Hall of Fame and the Hockey Hall of Fame in 2026.

== Early life ==
Patrice Bergeron-Cleary was born on July 24, 1985, in L'Ancienne-Lorette, a suburb of Quebec City, to his parents Gérard Cleary and Sylvie Bergeron. He is of Irish descent on his father’s side and French Canadian from his mother. Although his legal surname is Bergeron-Cleary, it was truncated to Bergeron for simplicity. Bergeron grew up alongside his older brother Guillaume in his hometown of L'Ancienne-Lorette, Quebec, and was a Quebec Nordiques fan in his youth. Growing up Bergeron was mostly an A and AA player throughout his minor hockey days.

== Playing career ==
=== Minor hockey ===
He played in the 1998 and 1999 Quebec International Pee-Wee Hockey Tournaments with a minor ice hockey team from Sainte-Foy, Quebec City. He was drafted in the fifth round of the 2001 QMJHL Draft out of AAA Bantam hockey with the Sainte-Foy Gouverneurs. The following year, he played A hockey for the Séminaire St-François Blizzard before reporting to the Acadie-Bathurst Titan of the Quebec Major Junior Hockey League.

=== Boston Bruins (2003–2023) ===
==== Beginnings (2003–2007) ====
Bergeron was drafted 45th overall in the 2003 NHL entry draft by the Boston Bruins. During his rookie season, he was selected for the NHL YoungStars Game in Minnesota as part of the 2004 All-Star weekend. He finished his rookie season with 39 points in 71 games. His first NHL goal came versus the Los Angeles Kings on October 18, 2003, in a 4–3 Boston road victory. He would then score the overtime-winning goal in Game 2 of the Eastern Conference Quarter-Finals against the rival Montreal Canadiens on April 9, 2004.

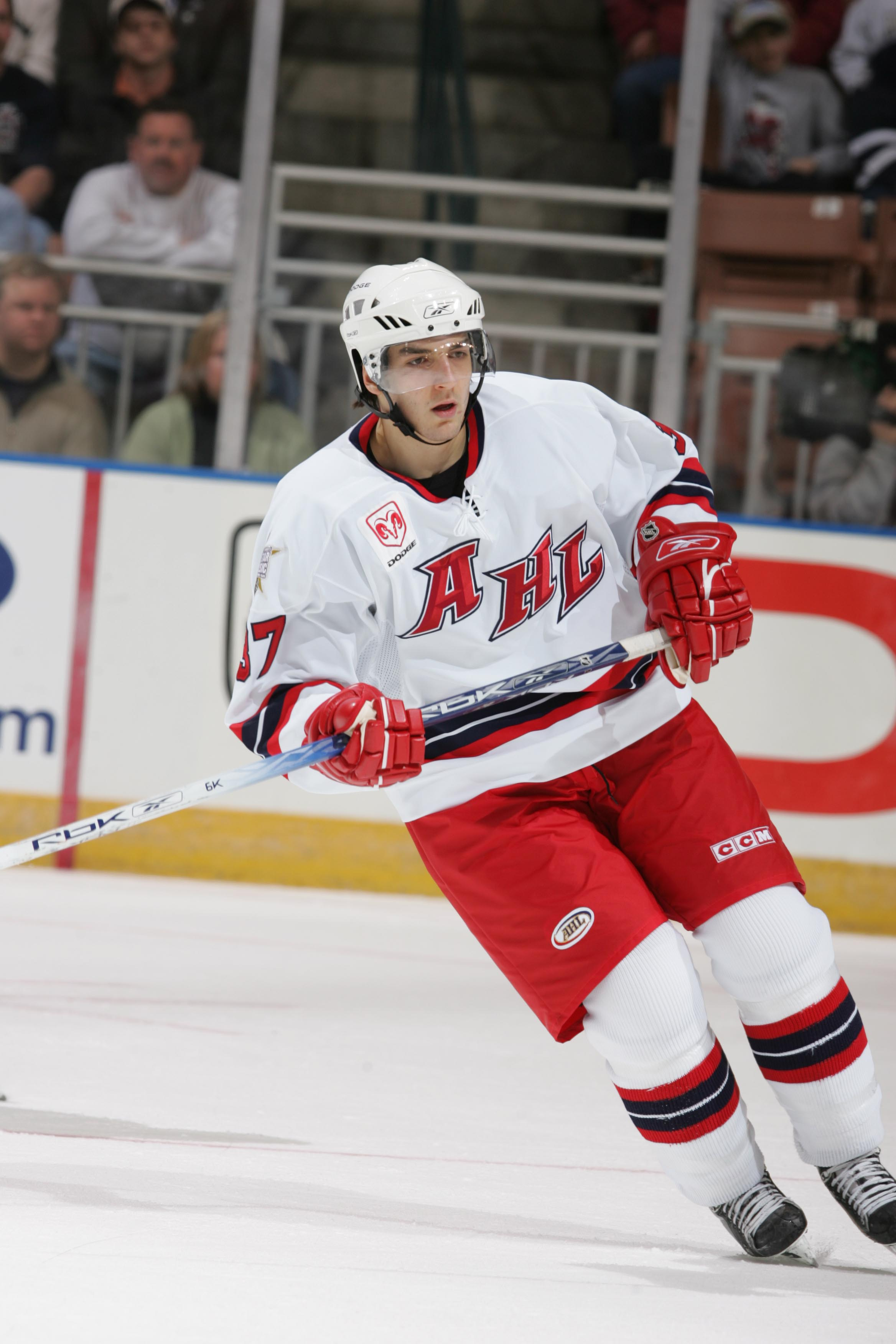
Bergeron during the AHL All-Star Game in February 2005. The Bruins assigned Bergeron to their AHL affiliate during the NHL lockout.

Due to the 2004–05 NHL lockout, Bergeron played for Boston's minor league affiliate, the Providence Bruins of the American Hockey League (AHL), tallying 61 points in 68 games.

As the NHL resumed the following season, Bergeron led the Bruins with a career-high 31 goals and 73 points. He played the majority of the season with linemates Brad Boyes and newcomer Marco Sturm, who had been acquired in a trade that sent captain Joe Thornton to the San Jose Sharks in November 2005. Then-Bruins general manager Mike O'Connell recalled in a June 2011 interview that the organization had decided to build the team around Bergeron instead of Thornton, preferring the former's on- and off-ice character.

Playing under a defensive system employed by new head coach Dave Lewis, he recorded his second consecutive 70-point campaign in 2006–07 with 22 goals and 48 assists. He again played alongside Sturm and Boyes until the latter was traded late in the season.

==== Establishment, Stanley Cup title, two more Stanley Cup Finals, "Perfection Line" era (2007–2020) ====
After recording three goals and four assists in the first ten games of the 2007–08 season, Bergeron suffered a season-ending head injury during a game on October 27, 2007. Checked from behind by Philadelphia Flyers defenceman Randy Jones, Bergeron hit his head on the end-boards, knocking him unconscious. He lay motionless on the ice for several minutes before being wheeled off on a stretcher and taken to Massachusetts General Hospital, where he was diagnosed with a broken nose and a grade-three concussion. Jones received a two-game suspension from the NHL. Bergeron made his first public statements regarding the injury on November 8, saying he would not take any legal action and that Jones had tried to contact him to apologize. On January 19, 2008, the Boston Globe reported Bergeron had been sent on vacation by then Bruins general manager Peter Chiarelli and that he would likely sit out for the remainder of the season as his recovery had regressed. In March 2008, Bergeron started preliminary on-ice practice with Bruins goaltender Manny Fernandez, who was himself recovering from knee surgery. He steadily progressed into full-contact practices in early-April, aiming for a playoff return against the Montreal Canadiens in the opening round; however, he was held back by team doctors. In June 2008, Bergeron was reported as being symptom-free during off-season training. He participated in the Bruins' summer development camp (typically for Bruins prospects) with Fernandez, before joining the Bruins' main training camp.

He returned to action with the Bruins for the team's preseason opening game on September 22, 2008, against the Montreal Canadiens, an 8–3 victory played in Halifax, Nova Scotia. After the 2008–09 season began, on October 23, Bergeron scored his first goal since his concussion, in a 4–2 home loss to the Toronto Maple Leafs. Two months later, in a game against the Carolina Hurricanes on December 20, Bergeron collided with opposing defenceman (and future Bruin) Dennis Seidenberg, suffering another concussion. He lay face down on the ice while being attended to by team trainers and eventually left the ice under his own power. He was released from the hospital the day after the collision and placed on injured reserve. (Seidenberg and Bergeron later became teammates on the Bruins after a trade for Byron Bitz to the Florida Panthers in 2010 to acquire Seidenberg.) Bergeron returned after being sidelined for one month and completed the season with 39 points in 64 games. In the first round of the 2009 playoffs, Bergeron recorded his first career fighting major in an altercation with Montreal's Josh Gorges.

In 2009–10, Bergeron scored 52 points (19 goals, 33 assists) and played in 73 games. During the 2010 playoffs, he scored four goals and added seven assists for 11 points in all 14 games as the Bruins upset the Buffalo Sabres in the first round before being defeated in seven games by the Philadelphia Flyers (despite initially having a 3–0 series lead at one point).

Halfway into the 2010–11 season, Bergeron scored his first career NHL hat-trick in a Bruins 6–0 victory over the Ottawa Senators on January 11, 2011. Bergeron took a hit from Claude Giroux on May 6, in game four of the second round in the 2011 playoffs against the Philadelphia Flyers, causing a mild concussion that kept Bergeron out of the first two games of the third round against the Tampa Bay Lightning before eventually returning to the lineup in game three to help the Bruins eventually defeat the fifth-seeded Lightning in seven games. On June 1, during game one on the Stanley Cup Final against the Presidents' Trophy-winning-Vancouver Canucks, Canucks' forward Alexandre Burrows allegedly bit Bergeron's finger during a scrum. No penalty was called and the NHL did not fine or suspend Burrows because the alleged bite was not supported by any evidence except a video of Burrows biting Bergeron's glove while his hand was still inside it and bite marks on Bergeron's finger. The Bruins lost games one, two, and five away by one goal, but won games three, four, and six at home in one sided fashions, tying the series at three games apiece. On June 15, Bergeron scored two goals in game seven of the series (including the game and series winner) against Canucks goaltender Roberto Luongo in a 4–0 victory over a Canucks in the game and 4–3 victory in the series, as the Bruins captured their sixth Stanley Cup in franchise history and first since 1972 and overcoming a 3–2 series deficit in the process. Bergeron also became the 26th member of the Triple Gold Club. He is engraved on the Stanley Cup using his birth name, Patrice Bergeron-Cleary.

After the close of the 2012 playoffs, even with the defending Stanley Cup champion Bruins eliminated in the first round in seven games by the seventh-seeded Washington Capitals, Bergeron's constant defensive efforts on the ice earned him the Frank J. Selke Trophy as the NHL's top defensive forward for the 2011–12 season for the first time in his career.

After finishing second in Selke Trophy voting for the lockout-shortened 2012–13 season (only behind Chicago Blackhawks forward and captain Jonathan Toews), Bergeron turned in a heroic playoff performance in the 2013 playoffs which included the tying- and game-winning goals against the fifth-seeded Toronto Maple Leafs in game seven of Round 1, and the overtime winner in game three of the Eastern Conference Final against the top-seeded Pittsburgh Penguins. Earlier, in the third round series against the Penguins in game one on June 1, 2013, he and Evgeni Malkin fought at centre ice, leading to Malkin knocking off Bergeron's helmet before they both threw off their gloves to fight. The two continued to throw blows even while referees attempted to separate them. Bergeron also became renowned in the hockey world for displaying his toughness when, in the Stanley Cup Finals against the Presidents' Trophy-winning Chicago Blackhawks where the Bruins lost in six games, he played through a punctured lung, separated shoulder, a broken rib and a broken nose.

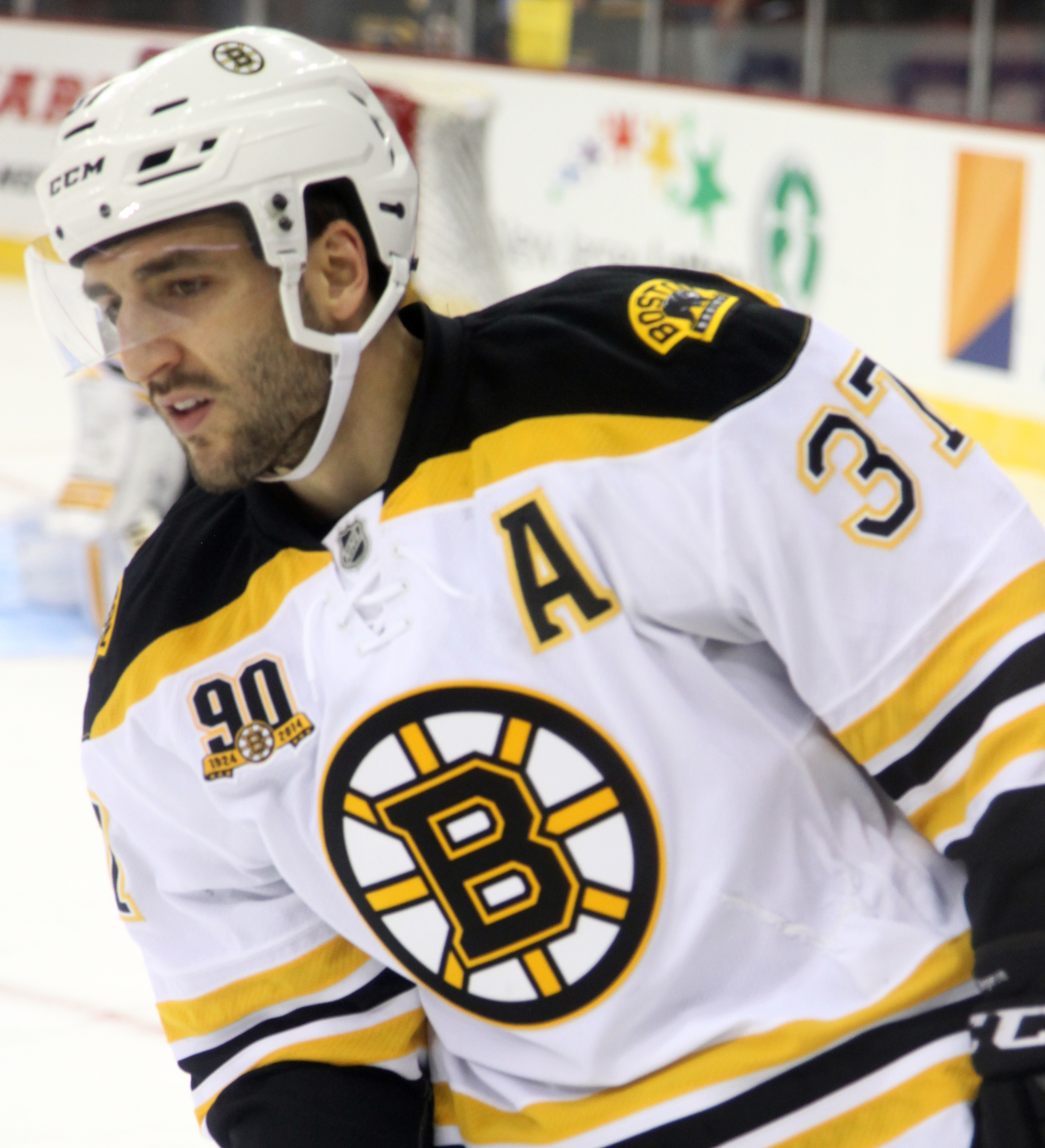
Bergeron in March 2014

The Bruins re-signed Bergeron to an eight-year, $52 million ($6.5 million per year) contract extension on July 12, 2013. In the following 2013–14 season, Bergeron reached the 30-goal mark for the second time in his career, achieving a total of 30 goals and 32 assists, and was a major factor as the Bruins won the Presidents' Trophy as the regular season champions. For his performance in the regular season, Bergeron was awarded his second career Frank J. Selke Trophy, as well as the NHL Foundation Player Award. He was named as the cover athlete for the NHL 15 video game in the same ceremony.

Towards the end of the 2014–15 season, on February 23, 2015, in a game against the Chicago Blackhawks, Bergeron scored his 200th career goal on Hawks' goaltender Corey Crawford as the Bruins would clinch a 6–2 victory in the game. Bergeron, who has played his entire NHL career as a member of the Bruins since they drafted him in 2003 in the second round, became the 17th player in franchise history to score 200 or more career goals for the club. Despite the Bruins missing the 2015 playoffs by just two points in the league standings, Bergeron was awarded the Selke Trophy for the second straight season and third time altogether after being named a finalist for the fourth consecutive season and time in his career.

Despite the Bruins narrowly missing the playoffs again by having missed by just three points, Bergeron was named a finalist for the Selke Trophy for the fifth consecutive year after recording 32 goals, 36 assists and 68 points although the Selke Trophy would get awarded Los Angeles Kings forward Anže Kopitar.

Bergeron's play during the 2016–17 season was hampered by a sports hernia that occurred at some time early in the season, but which was only revealed on April 25, 2017, after the Bruins were defeated in the first round of the 2017 playoffs in six games by the Ottawa Senators. Bergeron's sports hernia was operated on May 8, and he was expected to be ready for the Bruins' training camp before the 2017–18 season began. Bergeron played 79 games with 21 goals, 32 assists and 53 points in the season with first line of him, Brad Marchand and David Pastrňák labeled as "The Perfection Line" by the media. Bergeron was awarded his fourth career Selke Trophy after being named a finalist for the sixth consecutive season and sixth time in his career altogether.

Near the halfway point of the 2017–18 season, on January 6, 2018, in a 7–1 home win for the Bruins over the Carolina Hurricanes, Bergeron scored four goals, including Bergeron's first-ever NHL natural hat trick, bringing his scoring-point total (goals/assists combined) to 702 in his NHL career. Five games later, on January 18, Bergeron recorded the third hat-trick of his career (and second of the season) in a 5–2 win over the New York Islanders. After blocking an opposition shot with his right foot on February 24 against the hosting Toronto Maple Leafs, Bergeron discovered two days later he had broken a bone in his foot and would remain out of action for two weeks pending further evaluation of his foot fracture. By March 19, Bergeron had been able to start practicing his skating with the team. Bergeron was cleared to play in the Bruins road game against the Minnesota Wild on March 25, recording assists on each of the goals scored in the Bruins' 2–1 overtime win. Bergeron ended the season with 30 goals, 33 assists for 63 points in 64 games played and was named a finalist for the Selke Trophy for the seventh consecutive time in his career and seventh time altogether, which eventually went to Anže Kopitar of the Los Angeles Kings.

The 2018–19 season for the Bruins saw Bergeron achieve some impressive milestones in his NHL career: on December 22, 2018, Bergeron scored his 300th goal in a 5–2 win over the Nashville Predators on Predators goaltender Pekka Rinne. On February 5, 2019, Bergeron played in his 1,000th NHL game, all with the Bruins, scoring two goals in a 3–1 home ice win against the visiting New York Islanders By the late-season games of the 2018–19 season, Bergeron was set to break the 800-point milestone in his NHL career, which was achieved on March 16, with a goal that tied the game in the first period, leading to a 2–1 home-ice overtime Bruins win over the visiting Columbus Blue Jackets. On April 17, Bergeron was nominated for the Selke Trophy for an NHL-record eighth straight season which was eventually given to Ryan O'Reilly of the St. Louis Blues. Bergeron and the Bruins would eventually go on to the 2019 Stanley Cup Final in which the Bruins lost in seven games to the St. Louis Blues, one win short from winning a second Stanley Cup.

On July 20, 2020, Bergeron was named a Selke finalist for a 9th consecutive season after helping the Bruins clinch the Presidents' Trophy as the best regular season team but the trophy ultimately went to Sean Couturier of the Philadelphia Flyers.

==== Final years and captaincy (2020–2023) ====
On January 7, 2021, Bergeron was named the captain of the Boston Bruins. Zdeno Chára, who had been the team's captain since 2006–07, signed with the Washington Capitals two weeks earlier in December 2020. At the end of the pandemic-shortened 2020–21 season, Bergeron ranked fourth on the Boston Bruins all-time scoring list with 917 total points (375 goals and 542 assists). At the time, he trailed only Ray Bourque, Johnny Bucyk and Phil Esposito. Just days before the June 9 elimination of the Bruins from the 2021 playoffs by the New York Islanders in six games in the second round, Bergeron was nominated as a candidate for the Frank J. Selke Trophy for the tenth straight season but the trophy was eventually given to Florida Panthers forward and captain Aleksander Barkov - However, Bergeron would instead win the Mark Messier Leadership Award for the 2020–21 season; for strong team leadership, and contributions to the general society.

It was not until the eighth game of the 2021–22 season on November 4, 2021, that Bergeron would register his first Bruins goal of the season. On that day, in a home game against the visiting Detroit Red Wings, Patrice scored only his second natural hat trick - and seventh hat trick overall - of his NHL career, as the foundation for a four-goal game by the Bruins team captain in a 5–1 defeat of the Red Wings. On April 28, 2022, against the Buffalo Sabres, Bergeron scored a hat trick for his 400th career goal. He became the fourth Bruins player ever to score 400 goals for one team, joining Johnny Bucyk (545), Phil Esposito (459), and Rick Middleton (402). The Bruins were eliminated in the first round of the 2022 playoffs by the Carolina Hurricanes. With the season marking the end of Bergeron's contract, and in light of his age and history of injuries, there was considerable uncertainty as to whether he would continue with the team. He ruled out playing for any other team, saying he would either re-sign or retire. Bergeron was once again nominated for the Selke Trophy for the eleventh time, and it was announced on June 5, that he had won the award for the record-setting fifth time.

On August 8, 2022, Bergeron signed a one-year contract to return to the Bruins for his nineteenth season. Bergeron scored his 1,000th point in his NHL career on November 21, with an assist on a goal by longtime linemate Brad Marchand, in a 5–3 win over the Tampa Bay Lightning. In 2023, Bergeron beat his own record with a sixth Selke trophy win after being named a top three finalist for the twelfth time in his career and twelfth consecutive season. Bergeron helped the Bruins win the Presidents' Trophy as the best regular season team for 2022–23 before being defeated in 7 games in the first round of the 2023 playoffs by the eighth-seeded Florida Panthers after initially leading the series 3–1.

Bergeron announced his retirement from hockey on July 25, 2023, a day after his 38th birthday, having played nineteen seasons in the NHL.

=== Post-retirement ===
During the 2024-25 season, Bergeron, alongside Tuukka Rask and Andrew Raycroft, started Unobstructed Views, a Bruins-themed alternate live telecast series on NESN. In 2025, Bergeron won a Regional Emmy Award for Outstanding Sports Interview/Discussion.

Bergeron was selected as a first-ballot inductee into the Hockey Hall of Fame class of 2026. The Bruins will retire Bergeron's no. 37 during the 2026–27 season, with a ceremony on December 1, 2026.

== International play ==
Medal record

Ice hockey

Representing Canada

Winter Olympics
Gold medal – first place	2014 Sochi	
Gold medal – first place	2010 Vancouver	

World Championships
Gold medal – first place	2004 Czech Republic	

Canada Cup / World Cup
Gold medal – first place	2016 Toronto	

World Junior Championships
Gold medal – first place	2005 United States	

Spengler Cup
Gold medal – first place	2012 Davos	

Following his rookie season in the NHL, Bergeron was selected to play for Canada at the 2004 World Championships in Prague. He scored one goal in his international debut and won his first gold medal with Canada.

The following year, Bergeron was chosen to the Canadian national junior team for the 2005 World Junior Championships in North Dakota. He was lent to the team from the Providence Bruins of the AHL, where he was playing due to the NHL lockout. Bergeron was eligible for the World Juniors the previous year as well but was not lent to the national team because he was playing in the NHL. He finished the tournament with 5 goals and 8 assists totalling 13 points over 6 games while playing on a line with Sidney Crosby and Corey Perry. He scored a goal in Canada's 6–1 gold medal victory over Russia. He finished the tournament as the leading scorer to earn MVP and All-Star team honours. By helping Canada win gold at the tournament, he became the first player to win a men's gold medal before winning at the junior level.

Bergeron made his second appearance at the World Championships in 2006 and was reunited on a line with World Junior teammate Sidney Crosby, to whom he finished second in tournament scoring with 14 points. Bergeron was once again invited to play for Canada in the 2007 World Championships. He declined, citing he wanted to recover from injuries suffered during the NHL season.

On December 30, 2009, Bergeron was selected to play for Canada for the 2010 Winter Olympics in Vancouver; he was the only player selected who did not receive an invitation to the selection camp earlier in the summer. Many commentators predicted Bergeron would play on a line with Crosby due to his previous experience with him at the World Juniors and World Championships, but he ended up as the 13th forward due to a groin injury incurred in Canada's first game. He played primarily on the penalty kill and in defensive-zone faceoffs.

During the 2012–13 NHL lockout, Bergeron played for Lugano and competed for Canada at the 2012 Spengler Cup, along with teammate at the time, Tyler Seguin. Canada took gold in the event, and Bergeron scored the first goal in the first minute of a 7–2 Canada rout over Davos, and added three assists.

Bergeron won his second gold medal with Canada at the 2014 Winter Olympics and was a member of Canada's championship team at the 2016 World Cup of Hockey, reunited on both occasions on a line with Sidney Crosby.

== Personal life ==
Bergeron and his wife Stephanie Bertrand have four children together. He enjoys playing guitar and golf in his free time.

In honor of him scoring his 1000th point, at the time Massachusetts Governor Charlie Baker presented Bergeron with an official proclamation declaring December 17, 2022 was “Patrice Bergeron Day” in Massachusetts.

== Philanthropy ==
Throughout his playing career Bergeron took part in multiple charitable events. Establishing “Patrice’s Pals” in 2005 which host families and pediatric patients to a Bruins game in a luxury suite at the TD Garden. Over the course of his career, the program hosted more than 10,000 children from various partnering organizations, including the Cam Neely Foundation, Joslin Diabetes Center, and Shriners Hospital for Children.

Alongside Simon Gagné, Bergeron also serves as a co-chair of the annual Pro-Am Hockey Tournament held in Quebec City. An event features a match-up of professional and amateur hockey players from the area. The event has since raised over $1 million for organizations that help sick or disabled children.

From 2015 to 2018, he helped lead the Cuts for a Cause fundraiser, which later evolved into the Pucks & Paddles ping-pong tournament in 2018, raising more than $400,000 for Special Olympics, the Boston Bruins Foundation and children's hospitals. He has also been a driving force behind the Bruins’ yearly holiday toy drive, an effort that has provided over $100,000 in toys to children receiving care at Boston hospitals since 2010. He has also been involved in the youth hockey community in the Boston area serving as a mentor along with giving skating lessons.

In December 2023, Bergeron made his debut for the Bruins alumni team, he has since continued to play in charity games with the team. In addition he is a partner of Kraft Hockeyville an organization that maintains/upgrades sports and recreation areas and arenas.

== Career statistics ==
=== Regular season and playoffs ===
			Regular season					Playoffs
Season	Team	League	GP	G	A	Pts	PIM	GP	G	A	Pts	PIM
2000–01	Sainte-Foy Gouveneurs	QMAAA	5	1	2	3	0	—	—	—	—	—
2001–02	Séminaire St-François Blizzard	QMAAA	38	25	37	62	18	—	—	—	—	—
2001–02	Acadie–Bathurst Titan	QMJHL	4	0	1	1	0	—	—	—	—	—
2002–03	Acadie–Bathurst Titan	QMJHL	70	23	50	73	62	11	6	9	15	6
2003–04	Boston Bruins	NHL	71	16	23	39	22	7	1	3	4	0
2004–05	Providence Bruins	AHL	68	21	40	61	59	16	5	7	12	4
2005–06	Boston Bruins	NHL	81	31	42	73	22	—	—	—	—	—
2006–07	Boston Bruins	NHL	77	22	48	70	26	—	—	—	—	—
2007–08	Boston Bruins	NHL	10	3	4	7	2	—	—	—	—	—
2008–09	Boston Bruins	NHL	64	8	31	39	2	11	0	5	5	11
2009–10	Boston Bruins	NHL	73	19	33	52	28	13	4	7	11	2
2010–11	Boston Bruins	NHL	80	22	35	57	26	23	6	14	20	28
2011–12	Boston Bruins	NHL	81	22	42	64	20	7	0	2	2	8
2012–13	HC Lugano	NLA	21	11	18	29	8	—	—	—	—	—
2012–13	Boston Bruins	NHL	42	10	22	32	18	22	9	6	15	13
2013–14	Boston Bruins	NHL	80	30	32	62	43	12	3	6	9	4
2014–15	Boston Bruins	NHL	81	23	32	55	44	—	—	—	—	—
2015–16	Boston Bruins	NHL	80	32	36	68	49	—	—	—	—	—
2016–17	Boston Bruins	NHL	79	21	32	53	24	6	2	2	4	2
2017–18	Boston Bruins	NHL	64	30	33	63	26	11	6	10	16	2
2018–19	Boston Bruins	NHL	65	32	47	79	30	24	9	8	17	12
2019–20	Boston Bruins	NHL	61	31	25	56	28	13	2	6	8	6
2020–21	Boston Bruins	NHL	54	23	25	48	16	11	4	5	9	4
2021–22	Boston Bruins	NHL	73	25	40	65	32	7	3	4	7	4
2022–23	Boston Bruins	NHL	78	27	31	58	22	3	1	0	1	0
NHL totals			1,294	427	613	1,040	494	170	50	78	128	96

=== International ===
Bold indicates led tournament

Year	Team	Event	Result	GP	G	A	Pts	PIM
2004	Canada	WC	1st place, gold medalist(s)	9	1	0	1	4
2005	Canada	WJC	1st place, gold medalist(s)	6	5	8	**13**	6
2006	Canada	WC	4th	9	6	8	14	2
2010	Canada	OG	1st place, gold medalist(s)	7	0	1	1	2
2012	Canada	SC	1st place, gold medalist(s)	4	1	4	**5**	4
2014	Canada	OG	1st place, gold medalist(s)	6	0	2	2	4
2016	Canada	WCH	1st place, gold medalist(s)	6	4	3	7	2
Junior totals				6	5	8	13	6
Senior totals				41	12	18	30	18

== Awards, honours and records ==
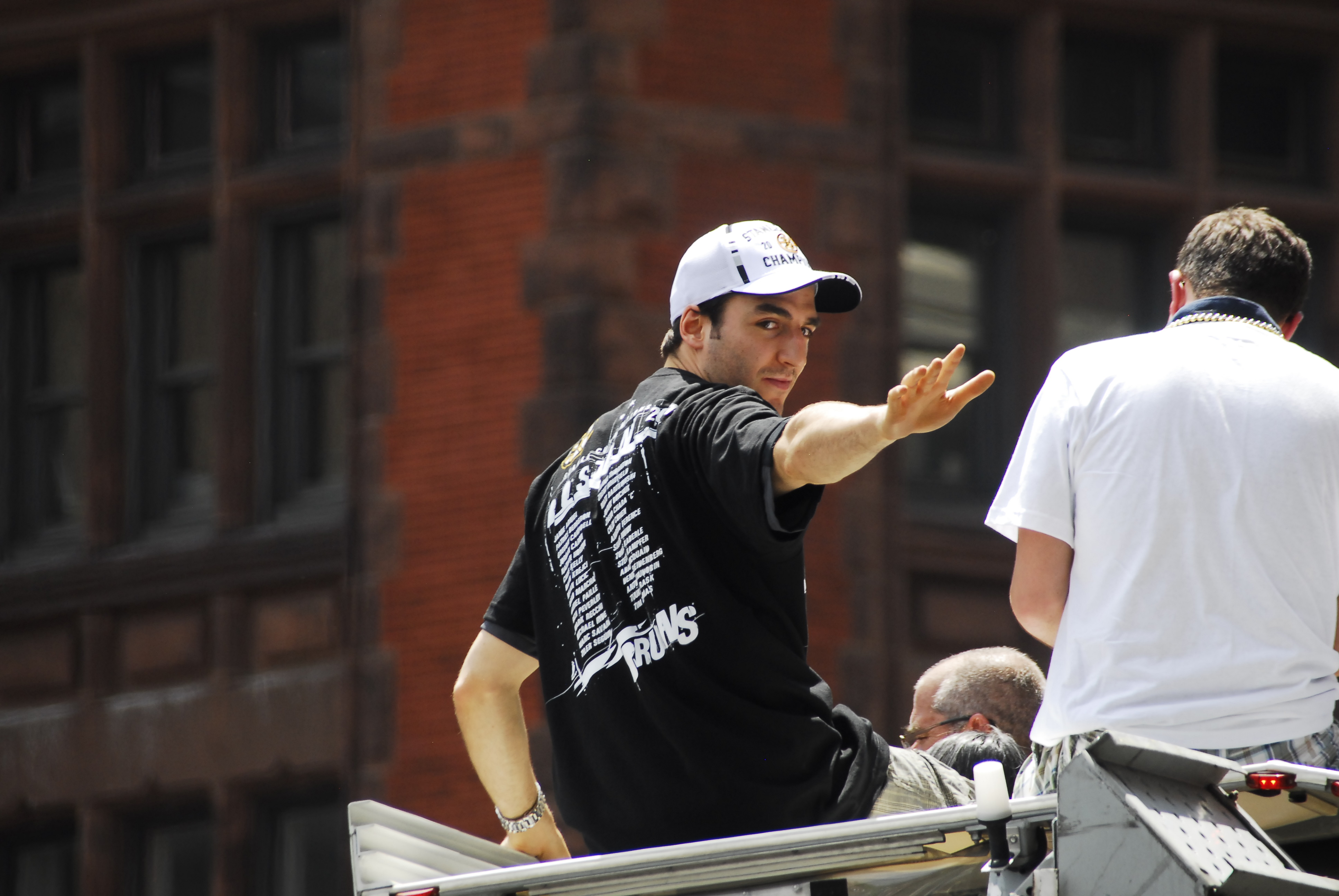
Bergeron waves to the crowd during the Bruins 2011 Stanley Cup victory parade.

Award	Year
AHL
AHL All-Star Game	2005
NHL
NHL YoungStars Game	2004
Stanley Cup champion	2011
Frank J. Selke Trophy	2012, 2014, 2015, 2017, 2022, 2023
King Clancy Memorial Trophy	2013
NHL Foundation Player Award	2014
NHL All-Star Game	2015, 2016, 2022
NHL 2010s All-Decade Second Team	2020
Mark Messier Leadership Award	2021
International
IIHF World Junior Championship Most Valuable Player	2005
IIHF World Junior Championship All-Star Team	2005
IIHF World Championship Top 3 Player on Team	2006
IIHF Hall of Fame	2026
Boston Bruins
Elizabeth C. Dufresne Trophy	2006, 2010, 2013
Bruins Three Stars Awards	2006, 2010, 2011, 2012, 2013, 2014, 2015, 2016, 2017, 2018, 2019, 2021, 2022
John P. Bucyk Award	2007, 2020, 2023
Eddie Shore Award	2013
Named One of Top 100 Best Bruins Players of all Time	2024
Boston Bruins All-Centennial Team	2024

- Member of the Triple Gold Club
- Scored the Stanley Cup-winning goal in 2011
- Voted the cover athlete for EA Sports' NHL 15 video game
- Received the Hockey Legacy Award from The Sports Museum at TD Garden for his contributions to hockey and his community service work.
- In 2023, he was ranked number 46 in The Athletic’s list of the 100 greatest hockey players of all time
- His #23 jersey number was retired by the Séminaire St-François Blizzard on September 15, 2025.

=== Records ===
- First and only player in history to win the IIHF World Championship before the IIHF World U20 Championship
- Most Frank J. Selke Trophy wins in NHL history (6)
- Nominated for the Frank J. Selke Trophy for an NHL-record 12 straight seasons
- Frank J. Selke Trophy finalist for 12 consecutive seasons, the longest streak ever for a voted NHL Award in NHL history.
- Most playoff overtime goals in Boston Bruins history

== See also ==
- List of NHL players with 1,000 points
- List of NHL players with 1,000 games played

Awards and achievements
Preceded by Ryan Kesler; Jonathan Toews; Anze Kopitar; Aleksander Barkov	Frank J. Selke Trophy winner 2012; 2014, 2015; 2017; 2022, 2023	Succeeded by Jonathan Toews; Anze Kopitar; Anze Kopitar; Aleksander Barkov
Preceded by Daniel Alfredsson	King Clancy Memorial Trophy winner 2013	Succeeded by Andrew Ference
Sporting positions
Preceded by Zdeno Chára	Boston Bruins captain 2021–23	Succeeded by Brad Marchand
