= Matt Kassian =

Canadian ice hockey player (born 1986)

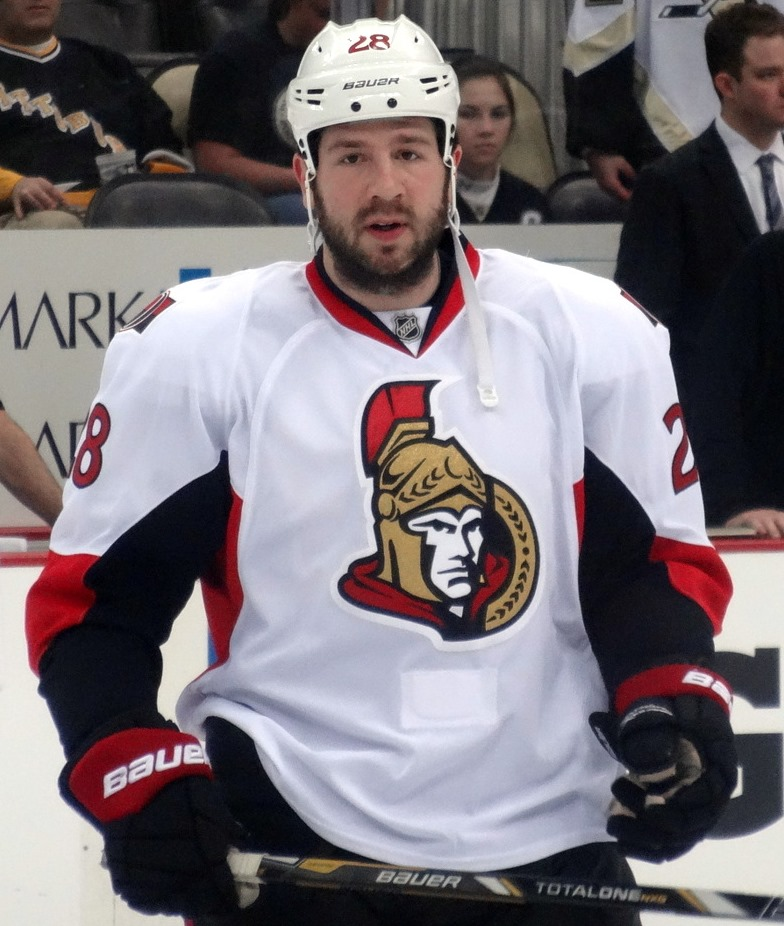
- With the Senators during the 2013 playoffs.
- Born: October 28, 1986 (age 39) Edmonton, Alberta, Canada
- Height: 6 ft 4 in (193 cm)
- Weight: 232 lb (105 kg; 16 st 8 lb)
- Position: Left wing
- Shot: Left
- Played for: Minnesota Wild; Ottawa Senators
- NHL draft: 57th overall, 2005; Minnesota Wild
- Playing career: 2007–2014

Matt Kassian (born October 28, 1986) is a Canadian former professional ice hockey player who has played in the National Hockey League (NHL) for the Minnesota Wild and the Ottawa Senators.

== Playing career ==
Kassian made his NHL debut during the 2010-11 season after originally being selected in the second round, 57th overall, by Minnesota in the 2005 NHL entry draft. His junior hockey career was spent with the Vancouver Giants of the WHL.

On November 3, 2010, the Minnesota Wild recalled Kassian from the American Hockey League's Houston Aeros. During the month of November 2010 Kassian played four games for the Wild, collecting 12 minutes in penalties and no points, with only a single shot on goal. He was then assigned back to the Aeros in December. He was re-called from the Aeros in mid-January. He recorded his first NHL goal on March 1, 2012 in the first period of a game against the Montreal Canadiens. He scored his second NHL goal in the third period of that same game.

On March 12, 2013, Kassian was traded from the Wild to the Ottawa Senators for a sixth round draft pick in 2014. He spent the remainder of the 2012-13 season and all of the 2013-14 season with the Senators, appearing in a total of 48 games, serving primarily as an enforcer. Following the 2013-14 season, Kassian was not re-signed by Ottawa. "I wanted to be back and they felt otherwise. That's their right as an organization," he said.

In September 2014, Kassian was invited to Arizona Coyotes' training camp but was ultimately not offered a contract. He was invited to attend AHL affiliate, the Portland Pirates training camp, and appeared in 2 games in the 2014-15 season with the club before ending his professional career and enrolling in business school.

He is of no relation to fellow professional forward Zack Kassian.

== Career statistics ==
			Regular season					Playoffs
Season	Team	League	GP	G	A	Pts	PIM	GP	G	A	Pts	PIM
2002–03	Sherwood Park Crusaders AAA	AMHL	33	5	7	12	38	15	7	3	10
2003–04	Vancouver Giants	WHL	37	1	0	1	42	3	0	0	0	4
2004–05	Vancouver Giants	WHL	41	0	3	3	89	—	—	—	—	—
2004–05	Kamloops Blazers	WHL	28	3	0	3	83	6	1	2	3	14
2005–06	Kamloops Blazers	WHL	67	5	6	11	147	—	—	—	—	—
2006–07	Kamloops Blazers	WHL	72	8	10	18	162	4	0	1	1	0
2007–08	Houston Aeros	AHL	19	0	0	0	48	—	—	—	—	—
2007–08	Texas Wildcatters	ECHL	47	6	4	10	90	—	—	—	—	—
2008–09	Houston Aeros	AHL	56	1	2	3	130	4	0	0	0	10
2009–10	Houston Aeros	AHL	59	2	4	6	149	—	—	—	—	—
2010–11	Houston Aeros	AHL	60	4	4	8	132	8	0	0	0	2
2010–11	Minnesota Wild	NHL	4	0	0	0	12	—	—	—	—	—
2011–12	Minnesota Wild	NHL	24	2	0	2	55	—	—	—	—	—
2011–12	Houston Aeros	AHL	26	2	2	4	34	—	—	—	—	—
2012–13	Houston Aeros	AHL	9	1	0	1	12	—	—	—	—	—
2012–13	Ottawa Senators	NHL	15	1	0	1	47	5	0	2	2	17
2013–14	Ottawa Senators	NHL	33	1	1	2	63	—	—	—	—	—
2014–15	Portland Pirates	AHL	2	0	0	0	0	—	—	—	—	—
AHL totals			231	10	12	22	505	12	0	0	0	12
NHL totals			76	4	1	5	177	5	0	2	2	17
