= Chris Casto =

American ice hockey player

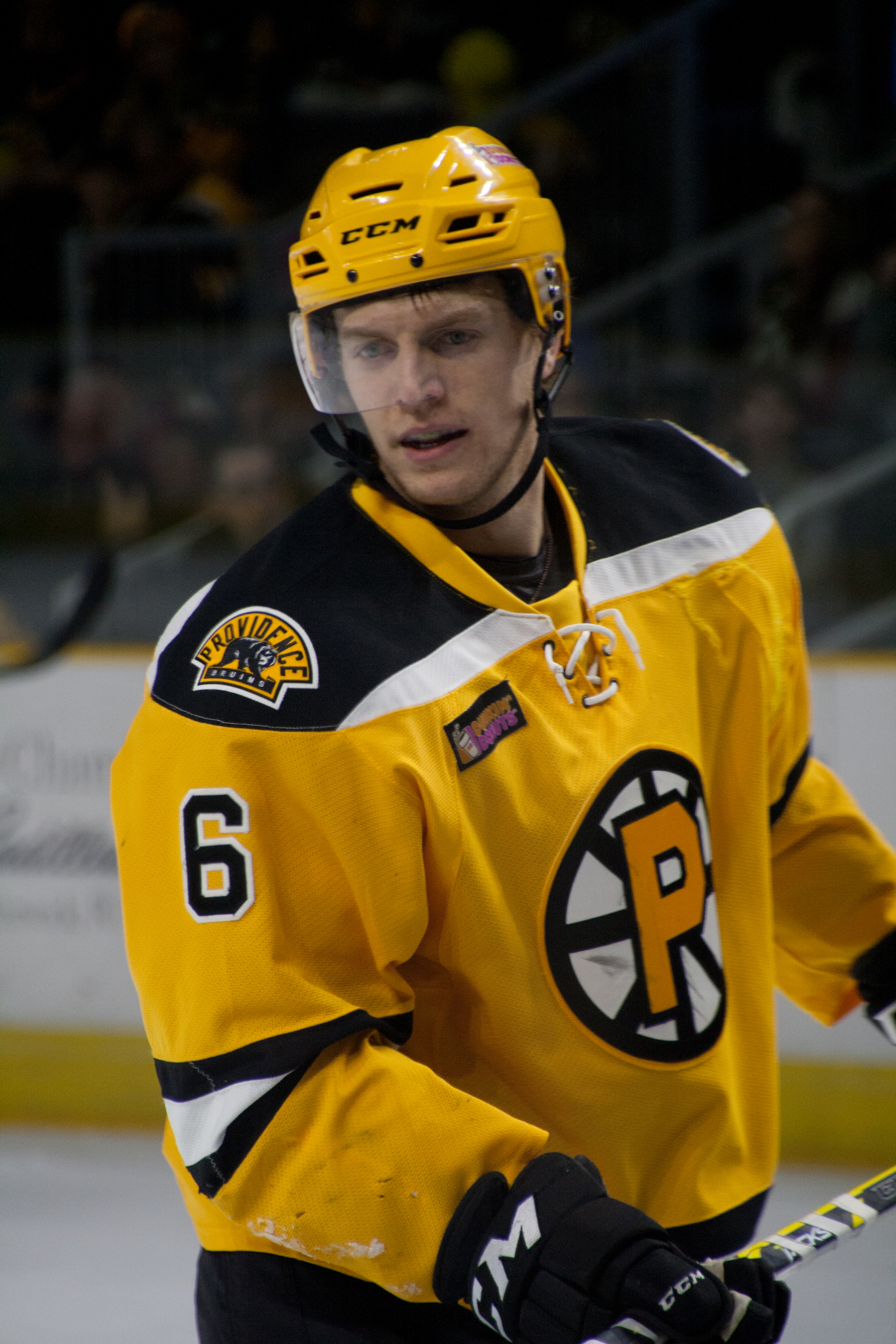
- Born: December 27, 1991 (age 34) Stillwater, Minnesota, U.S.
- Height: 6 ft 3 in (191 cm)
- Weight: 210 lb (95 kg; 15 st 0 lb)
- Position: Defense
- Shoots: Right
- AHL team Former teams: Free Agent; Providence Bruins; Chicago Wolves; Bridgeport Sound Tigers
- NHL draft: Undrafted
- Playing career: 2012–present

Chris Casto (born December 27, 1991) is an American professional ice hockey defenseman who is currently an unrestricted free agent. He most recently played for the Bridgeport Sound Tigers in the American Hockey League (AHL).

== Playing career ==
=== Amateur ===
Casto played three seasons for the Hill-Murray Pioneers in Maplewood, Minnesota. He played in 3 state tournaments helping the Pioneers to their third state championship in 2008.

In 2010 Casto was drafted 16th overall by the Lincoln Stars of the United States Hockey League and played the 2010–11 season with the team.

For the 2011–12 season Casto moved to the University of Minnesota Duluth Bulldogs for his freshman year. That year the Bulldogs reached the final of the Northeast region but lost to the eventual Frozen Four champion Boston College Eagles.

Casto remained at UMD for his sophomore season and was named to the WCHA All Academic Team.

=== Professional ===
On March 26, 2013, the Boston Bruins announced they had signed Casto to an entry-level contract for the 2013–14 season and on March 29, 2013, he signed an amateur tryout contract with the Providence Bruins allowing him to finish the season with the P-Bruins.

For the 2013–14 season Casto began the year at Boston Bruins training camp before being assigned to Providence on September 20, 2013. Casto played the majority of the season with Providence however he was briefly assigned to the South Carolina Stingrays for one game on December 12, 2013.

Casto again took part in Boston Bruins training camp in September 2014 however was assigned to Providence on September 28, 2014. He played the remainder of the 2014–15 season with Providence.

The Boston Bruins invited Casto to take part in training camp again in 2015 however he was again reassigned to Providence on September 29, 2015.

After four full seasons in the Bruins organization, Casto left the club as a free agent without breaking through to the NHL. On July 1, 2017, he was signed to a one-year, two-way contract with expansion club, the Vegas Golden Knights.

On September 25, 2018, having been unable to gain NHL interest, Casto signed a one-year AHL deal with the Bridgeport Sound Tigers.

== Career statistics ==
			Regular season					Playoffs
Season	Team	League	GP	G	A	Pts	PIM	GP	G	A	Pts	PIM
2007–08	Hill-Murray Pioneers	USHS	—	2	10	12	—	—	—	—	—	—
2008–09	Hill-Murray Pioneers	USHS	31	2	13	15	—	—	—	—	—	—
2009–10	Hill-Murray Pioneers	USHS	25	11	17	28	18	3	2	1	3	0
2010–11	Lincoln Stars	USHL	58	6	19	25	40	2	0	0	0	0
2011–12	University of Minnesota Duluth	WCHA	41	2	11	13	14	—	—	—	—	—
2012–13	University of Minnesota Duluth	WCHA	36	3	6	9	16	—	—	—	—	—
2012–13	Providence Bruins	AHL	4	0	0	0	0	—	—	—	—	—
2013–14	Providence Bruins	AHL	52	3	8	11	23	12	0	2	2	13
2013–14	South Carolina Stingrays	ECHL	1	0	0	0	0	—	—	—	—	—
2014–15	Providence Bruins	AHL	62	1	11	12	35	5	0	0	0	2
2015–16	Providence Bruins	AHL	68	7	16	23	47	3	0	1	1	5
2016–17	Providence Bruins	AHL	59	1	11	12	40	16	1	4	5	16
2017–18	Chicago Wolves	AHL	61	1	8	9	29	—	—	—	—	—
2018–19	Bridgeport Sound Tigers	AHL	43	4	9	13	21	—	—	—	—	—
AHL totals			349	17	63	80	195	36	1	7	8	36
