= Anton Khudobin =

Russian ice hockey player (born 1986)

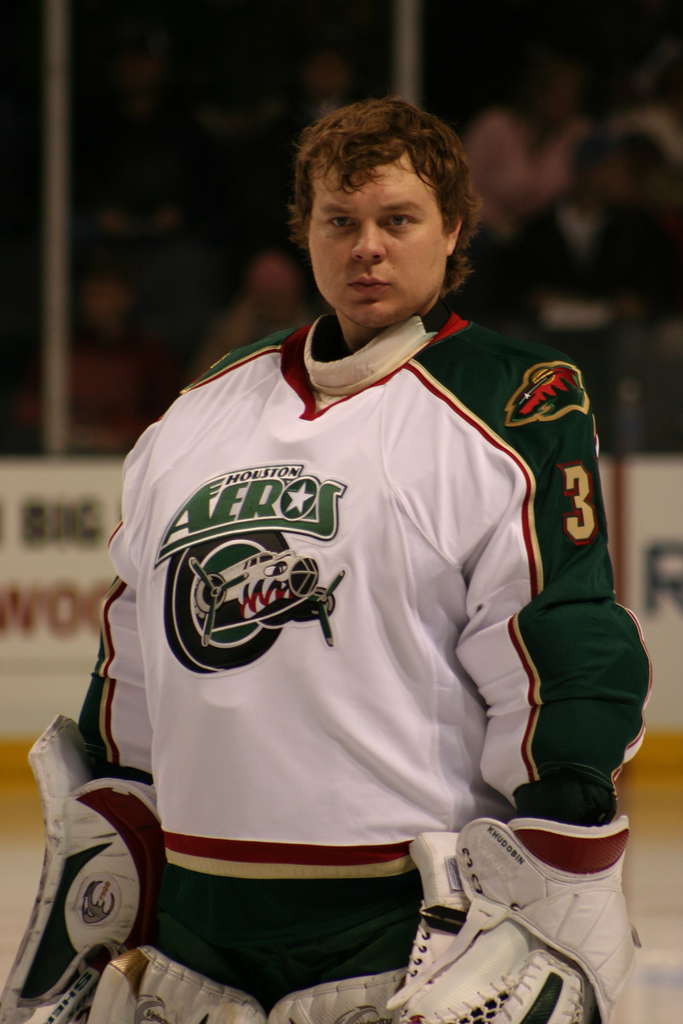
- Khudobin with the Houston Aeros in 2010
- Born: 7 May 1986 (age 40) Ust-Kamenogorsk, Kazakh SSR, Soviet Union
- Height: 5 ft 11 in (180 cm)
- Weight: 194 lb (88 kg; 13 st 12 lb)
- Position: Goaltender
- Caught: Left
- Played for: Metallurg Magnitogorsk; Minnesota Wild; Boston Bruins; Atlant Moscow Oblast; Carolina Hurricanes; Anaheim Ducks; Dallas Stars; Chicago Blackhawks; Sibir Novosibirsk
- National team: Russia
- NHL draft: 206th overall, 2004; Minnesota Wild
- Playing career: 2004–2024

Anton Valerievich Khudobin (Russian: Антон Валерьевич Худобин; born 7 May 1986) is a Kazakhstani-born Russian former professional ice hockey goaltender.

Nicknamed "Dobby", Khudobin was drafted by the Minnesota Wild in the seventh round, 206th overall, at the 2004 NHL entry draft, playing for the organization for three-and-a-half years before joining the Boston Bruins via a trade in 2011. He signed as a free agent with the Carolina Hurricanes in 2013 and was extended before being traded to the Anaheim Ducks in 2015, then re-signing with the Bruins in mid-2016, and then signing a two-year deal with the Dallas Stars as an unrestricted free agent.

== Playing career ==
=== Early career ===
Born to a Kazakh father of Russian descent, Valeri, and a Russian mother, Tatiana, Khudobin began his hockey career in his native Kazakhstan but moved to Russia at age 13 and joined the Metallurg hockey school in Magnitogorsk in order to develop his game at a higher level. He was a consistent starter for Russia's national junior squads, earning a gold medal with the under-18 team at the 2004 IIHF World U18 Championships and silver medals with the junior team at the 2005 and 2006 IIHF World Junior Ice Hockey Championships. At the end of this 2003–04 hockey season, Khudobin was drafted by the Minnesota Wild at the 2004 NHL entry draft in the seventh round, 206th overall.

Khudobin then played as a backup for Metallurg before deciding to move to North America and play in the Canadian major junior hockey system. He opted to join the Saskatoon Blades of the Western Hockey League (WHL) for the 2005–06 season, helping them to their best regular season finish in over a decade and backstopped them past the first round of the playoffs for the first time in six years.

In 2006, Khudobin returned to Russia and took over back-up goaltending duties for Metallurg in the Russian Superleague (RSL), helping the team to the league championship. In the summer of 2007, however, three years after initially being drafted, Khudobin signed a three-year, entry-level contract with the Wild.

=== Minnesota Wild ===
Khudobin spent the following season splitting time between the American Hockey League (AHL)'s Houston Aeros and the ECHL's Texas Wildcatters, earning top ECHL goaltender honors for 2007–08. In 2009–10, he made the full-time jump to the Aeros and later made his NHL debut for the Wild on 4 February 2010, replacing the injured Josh Harding in a 4–2 win over the Edmonton Oilers. He made his first NHL start two days later on 6 February 2010, stopping 38 of 39 shots in a 2–1 win over the Philadelphia Flyers.

Following a 24 September 2010, pre-season hip injury to Harding, the Wild's full-time back-up goaltender, Khudobin was expected to take over that role for the Wild. However, the Wild instead signed José Théodore to a one-year contract, leaving Khudobin in the number-three position. Soon after the signing Khudobin was returned to Houston. Khudobin was recalled by the Wild on 8 January 2011 to back-up Théodore after starter Niklas Bäckström suffered a strained hip flexor. On 12 January, Théodore suffered a similar injury, and Khudobin replaced him in the third period of a 5–1 loss to the Nashville Predators. After a 4–1 loss to the visiting Colorado Avalanche on 14 January, Khudobin posted his first career NHL shutout, making 32 saves in a 4–0 win over the visiting Vancouver Canucks.

=== Boston Bruins ===
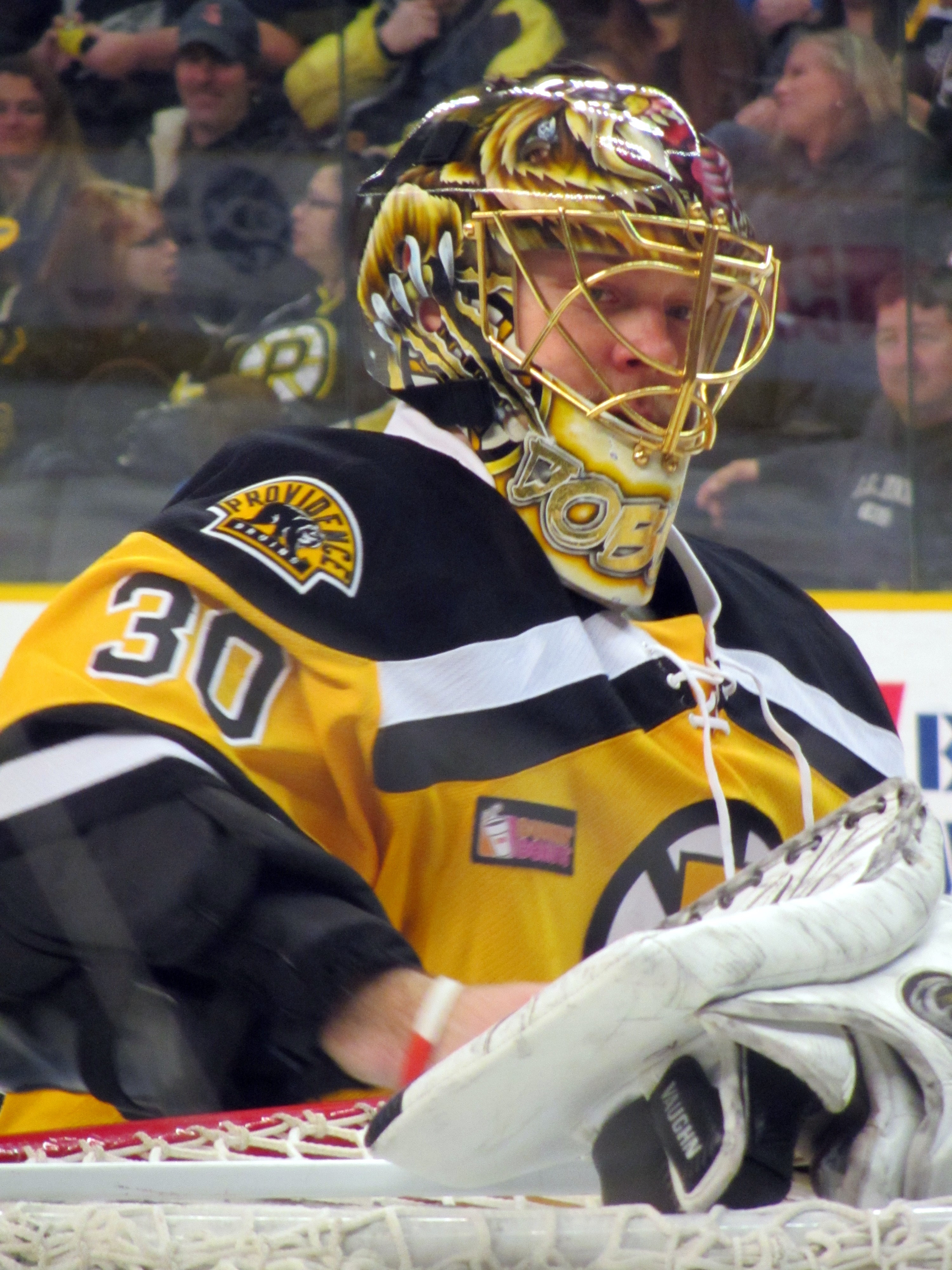
Khudobin with the Providence Bruins in 2012

Nearing the 2011 NHL trade deadline, Khudobin was traded to the Boston Bruins on 28 February 2011 in exchange for Jeff Penner and Mikko Lehtonen. Khudobin was then assigned to the AHL's Providence Bruins. Khudobin played in 16 games for the Providence Bruins, posting a 9–4–1 record with a 2.40 goals-against average and a .920 save percentage. As a result of his strong season, he was called up as an emergency goalie for Boston during their 2011 Stanley Cup playoff run. He was included in the team's celebratory picture after Boston won in the 2011 Final and was also awarded a Stanley Cup ring for his inclusion in the squad. However, due to the fact that he did not play for Boston during the 2010–11 season, his name was not engraved on the Stanley Cup.

On 1 July 2011, Khudobin signed a new two-year contract with the Bruins. While playing in Providence, Khudobin suffered an injured wrist during a game against the Bridgeport Sound Tigers and was unable to replace Tuukka Rask at the NHL level when he was injured in March. Khudobin needed nearly a month to recover and rejoined the AHL's line on 23 March for a game against the Manchester Monarchs. As Rask was expected to miss 4–6 weeks, Khudobin was immediately assigned to the Bruins' lineup. He played his first game with the Bruins that night on 5 April 2012, earning a win against the Ottawa Senators.

He later served as backup to Tuukka Rask during the lockout-shortened 2012–13 season.

=== Carolina Hurricanes ===
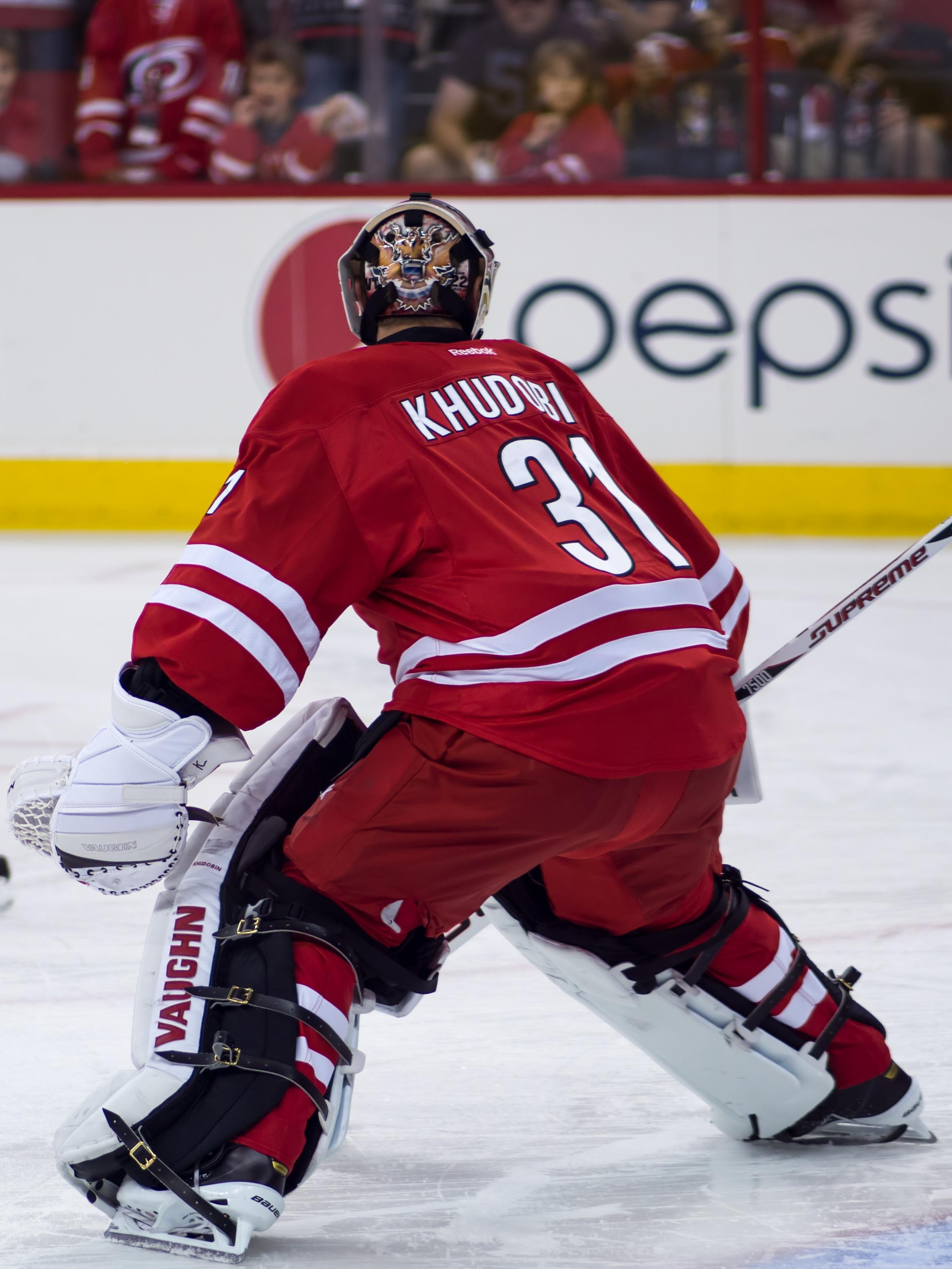
Khudobin during a game on 4 October 2013.

On 5 July 2013, the Carolina Hurricanes signed Khudobin as a free agent to one-year, one-way contract paying $800,000. His early start with the team began slowly after suffering an ankle injury on 13 October against the Phoenix Coyotes, resulting in a temporary conditioning stint in the AHL. Despite this, in his first year with the team he posted a 13–8–0 record with 2.17 goals-against average and .927 save percentage over 22 games. By January, he was named the NHL's First Star for the month after tying a franchise record for wins in a month with 10 and registering a goals-against average of 2.19 in 14 games. At the conclusion of the season, the Hurricanes President and General Manager Jim Rutherford re-signed him to a new two-year, $4.5 million contract, saying "he has played well this season and signing him helps solidify our team's goaltending situation." Following a successful season which saw him posting team-highs in save percentage and wins, Khudobin suggested that he felt he would supersede his fellow goaltender Cam Ward as starting goaltender for the team the following year.

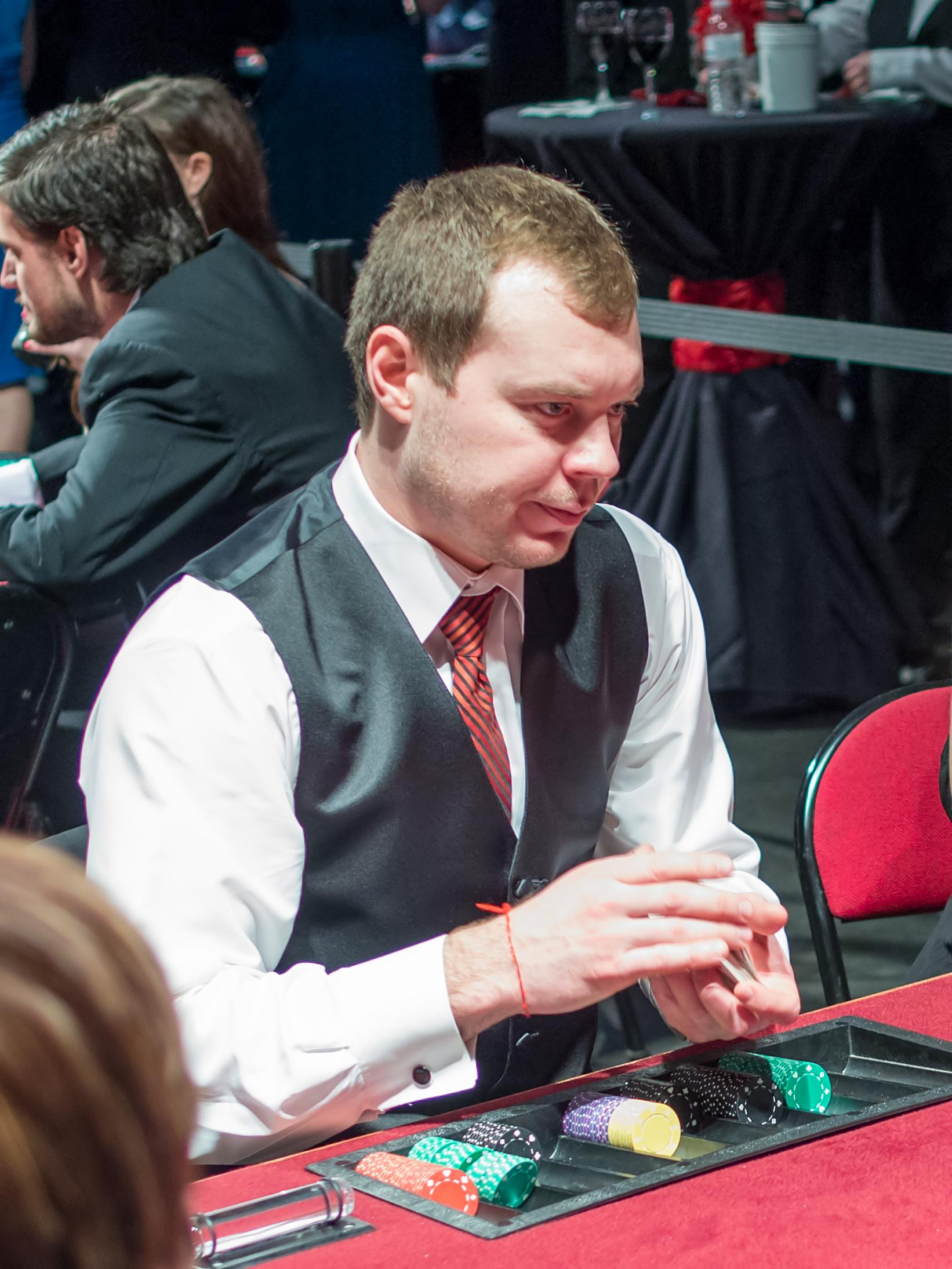
Khudobin at Hurricanes Casino Night in 2014.

During the 2014–15 season, Khudobin battled against Cam Ward to solidify his spot as the Hurricanes starting goaltender. After the firing of coach Kirk Muller and the hiring of David Marcoux as their newest goaltending coach, the two began to split the starting position. Marcoux said that he sees "it as two goaltenders who want to be part of the solution here...I appreciate their work and their positive attitudes, and both goalies are supportive of each other."

=== Anaheim Ducks ===
On 27 June 2015, the second day of the 2015 NHL entry draft, Khudobin was traded to the Anaheim Ducks in exchange for defenceman James Wisniewski. He made his first start with the team on 14 October against the Arizona Coyotes, replacing starter Frederik Andersen. When speaking on his decision, coach Bruce Boudreau said his strong preseason was enough to earn a starting position in an early game. His debut game lasted less than 13 minutes as he was pulled after allowing three goals on eight shots. He was replaced by Frederik Andersen following the third goal and the team eventually lost 4–0. The Ducks remained winless for the first five games of the season until 18 October when he started his second game and stopped 34 saves in an eventual 4–1 win over the Minnesota Wild. He played in eight games for the Ducks, posting a 3-3-0 record and 2.70 goals-against average, before being reassigned to their AHL affiliate, the San Diego Gulls on 15 December.

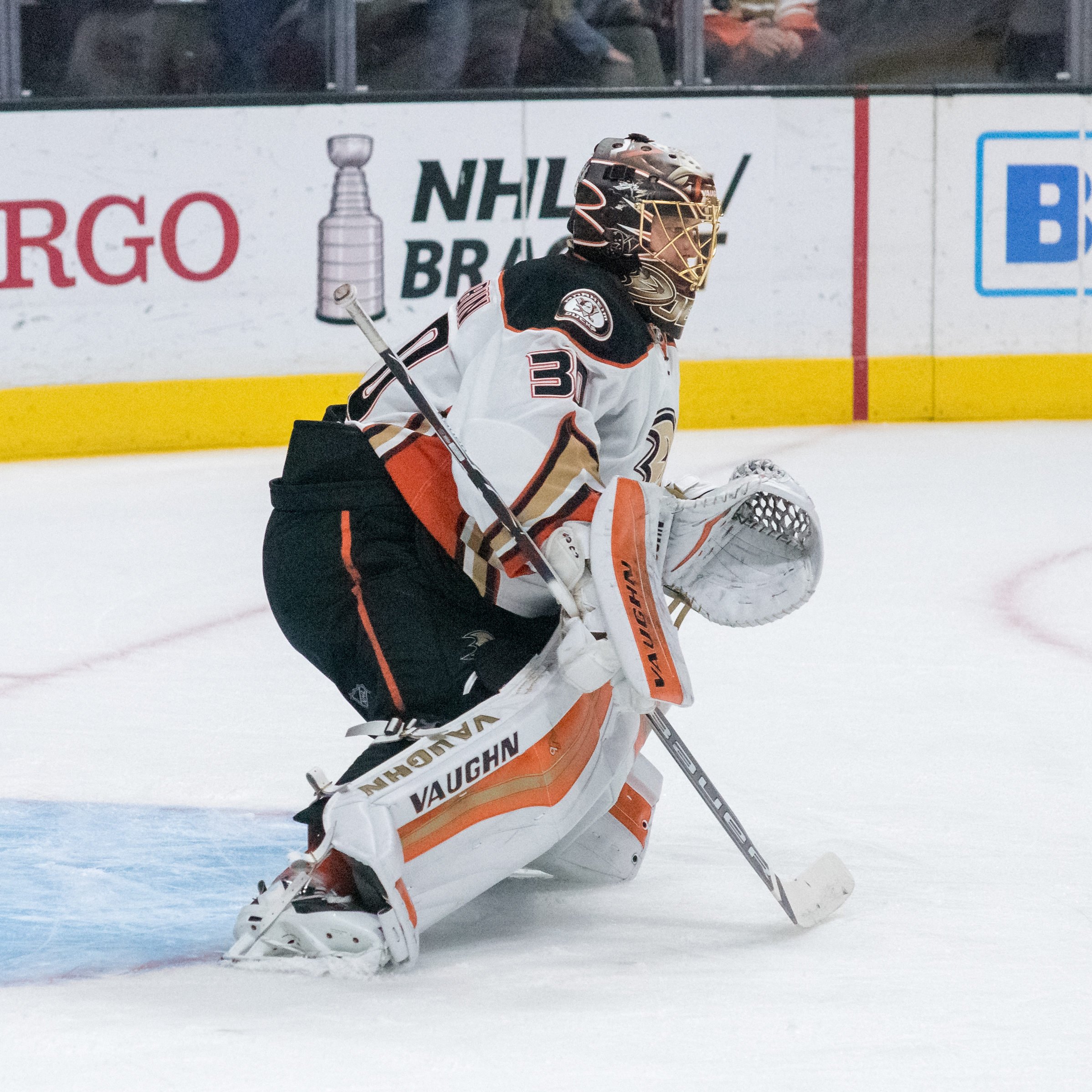
Khudobin during a game against the Los Angeles Kings in April 2016

During his reassignment to the Gulls, Khudobin posted a 4-4-1 record with a 2.60 GAA and .911 SV% in eight games before earning his first recall on 17 January 2016 to replace an injured Clayton Stoner. He earned another NHL recall on 14 February and served as back up to Andersen in back-to-back games before being sent back to the Gulls.

=== Return to Boston ===
As a free agent at the conclusion of the 2015–16 season with the Ducks, on 1 July 2016, Khudobin signed a two-year contract to return to the Boston Bruins. He began the season as Rask's backup but after the former suffered an injury, he started two games for the team and posted a 0–2–0 record with a .849 save percentage and 4.10 GAA. On 24 October, Khudobin suffered an upper-body injury and was expected to miss three weeks to recover.

Khudobin returned to the Bruins for the 2017–18 season but suffered an injury during training camp which kept him out of the lineup. Although he missed practice, coach Bruce Cassidy said it was "nothing major" and he was expected to start in net by the final preseason game against the Chicago Blackhawks.

=== Dallas Stars ===
On 1 July 2018, Khudobin joined his fifth NHL club as a free agent, agreeing to a two-year, $5 million contract to assume backup duties for the Dallas Stars. When speaking of the addition, General Manager Jim Nill spoke highly of the goaltender saying "Anton is a proven NHL netminder that gives his team a chance to win every time he's on the ice...We look forward to him joining our club and making a positive impact for the next two seasons." He designed his Dallas Stars goaltender mask with Dobby from Harry Potter as a homage to his nickname Dobby. During the pre-season, Khudobin split his time in net with rookie goaltender Colton Point who was making his NHL debut out of college. Confined to a backup role for the majority of the season, Khudobin made his third start for the Stars on 1 November 2018, in a 2–1 win over the Toronto Maple Leafs and his fourth on 5 November against the Boston Bruins. As the Stars pushed to qualify for the 2019 Stanley Cup playoffs, both Khudobin and Ben Bishop were praised for their goaltending abilities by coach Jim Montgomery. By February, he ranked fourth in goals-against averages and third in save percentage while posting a 9–9–2 record. With his assistance, the Stars qualified for the Stanley Cup playoffs for the first time since 2016 after he made 32 saves in a 6–2 win over the Philadelphia Flyers on 3 April. He finished the regular season with a 16–17–5 record, a 2.57 goals against average, and a .923 save percentage.

Khudobin returned to the Stars for the 2019–20 season, entering the final year of his two-year contract. He concluded the shortened season ending in March due to COVID-19 with an 11–7–1 record and tied for fourth with Ben Bishop in save percentage at .929. The NHL returned for the postseason in August starting goalie Ben Bishop got injured in the 3rd game of the playoffs. So Khudobin played 25 games during the postseason. He made 25 saves in game one of the Western Conference Final against the Vegas Golden Knights to clinch his first shutout of the season and the first postseason shutout of his career. He helped Dallas get to their first Stanley Cup Final since 2000, losing 4 games to 2 against the Tampa Bay Lightning.

On 9 October 2020, Khudobin signed a three-year, $10 million contract to remain with the Stars.

On 13 December 2021, with the goalie tandem of Braden Holtby and Jake Oettinger providing stellar play in net, the Stars waived Khudobin with two years and $7.05 million guaranteed left on his contract. He later cleared waivers and was assigned to the Texas Stars of the AHL.

=== Chicago Blackhawks ===
On 2 March 2023, the Stars traded Khudobin along with a second-round pick in the 2025 NHL Entry Draft to the Chicago Blackhawks in exchange for Max Domi and Dylan Wells.

=== Return to Russia ===
Having concluded his contract with the Blackhawks, Khudobin signed as a free agent with Russian second tier club, Sokol Krasnoyarsk of the VHL, on 5 September 2023. During the 2023–24 season, in November 2023, Khudobin was traded to Sibir Novosibirsk of the KHL in exchange for cash considerations, and made 5 appearances with the club.

On 6 August 2025, having not played competitively for two years, Khudobin officially announced his retirement from professional hockey after 20 seasons.

As of October 31, 2025, Khudobin serves as president of the Krasnoyarsk Krai Ice Hockey Federation; plans are in place to develop youth hockey in the region with the involvement of the "Red Machine" project.

== Career statistics ==
Medal record

Representing Russia

Ice hockey

World Championships
Gold medal – first place	2014 Belarus	
Silver medal – second place	2015 Czech Republic	

World Junior Championships
Silver medal – second place	2006 Canada	
Silver medal – second place	2005 United States	

IIHF World U18 Championship
Gold medal – first place	2004 Belarus	

=== Regular season and playoffs ===
			Regular season									Playoffs
Season	Team	League	GP	W	L	OTL	MIN	GA	SO	GAA	SV%	GP	W	L	MIN	GA	SO	GAA	SV%
2005–06	Saskatoon Blades	WHL	44	23	13	2	1373	114	4	2.90	.917	10	4	6	685	32	0	2.80	.920
2006–07	Metallurg Magnitogorsk	RSL	16	—	—	—	618	28	0	2.72	—	3	—	—	26	1	0	2.30	—
2007–08	Texas Wildcatters	ECHL	27	20	1	4	1549	51	3	1.98	.934	9	5	2	547	20	1	2.19	.933
2007–08	Houston Aeros	AHL	12	2	2	1	482	16	1	1.99	.911	—	—	—	—	—	—	—	—
2008–09	Florida Everblades	ECHL	33	18	10	1	1706	77	4	2.71	.907	—	—	—	—	—	—	—	—
2008–09	Houston Aeros	AHL	10	3	6	1	512	26	0	3.04	.892	17	8	8	890	30	2	2.70	.900
2009–10	Houston Aeros	AHL	40	14	19	4	2247	91	4	2.43	.907	—	—	—	—	—	—	—	—
2009–10	Minnesota Wild	NHL	2	2	0	0	69	1	0	0.87	.979	—	—	—	—	—	—	—	—
2010–11	Houston Aeros	AHL	34	19	12	1	1883	81	1	2.58	.911	—	—	—	—	—	—	—	—
2010–11	Minnesota Wild	NHL	4	2	1	0	189	5	1	1.59	.942	—	—	—	—	—	—	—	—
2010–11	Providence Bruins	AHL	16	9	4	1	901	36	1	2.40	.920	—	—	—	—	—	—	—	—
2011–12	Providence Bruins	AHL	44	21	19	3	2597	113	2	2.61	.919	—	—	—	—	—	—	—	—
2011–12	Boston Bruins	NHL	1	1	0	0	60	1	0	1.00	.977	—	—	—	—	—	—	—	—
2012–13	Atlant Moscow Oblast	KHL	26	6	14	4	1499	74	1	2.96	.912	—	—	—	—	—	—	—	—
2012–13	Boston Bruins	NHL	14	9	4	1	803	31	1	2.32	.920	—	—	—	—	—	—	—	—
2013–14	Carolina Hurricanes	NHL	36	19	14	1	2084	80	1	2.30	.926	—	—	—	—	—	—	—	—
2013–14	Charlotte Checkers	AHL	2	1	1	0	119	6	0	3.03	.928	—	—	—	—	—	—	—	—
2014–15	Carolina Hurricanes	NHL	34	8	17	6	1920	87	1	2.72	.900	—	—	—	—	—	—	—	—
2015–16	Anaheim Ducks	NHL	9	3	3	0	354	16	1	2.69	.909	—	—	—	—	—	—	—	—
2015–16	San Diego Gulls	AHL	31	19	8	4	1807	74	0	2.46	.921	4	2	1	185	7	0	2.26	.934
2016–17	Boston Bruins	NHL	16	7	6	1	885	39	0	2.64	.904	—	—	—	—	—	—	—	—
2016–17	Providence Bruins	AHL	11	7	3	1	626	28	2	2.69	.896	—	—	—	—	—	—	—	—
2017–18	Boston Bruins	NHL	31	16	6	7	1781	76	1	2.56	.913	1	0	0	27	0	0	0.00	1.000
2018–19	Dallas Stars	NHL	41	16	17	5	2220	95	2	2.57	.923	1	0	0	11	0	0	0.00	1.000
2019–20	Dallas Stars	NHL	30	16	8	4	1678	62	0	2.22	.930	25	14	10	1493	67	1	2.69	.917
2020–21	Dallas Stars	NHL	32	12	11	7	1795	76	3	2.54	.905	—	—	—	—	—	—	—	—
2021–22	Dallas Stars	NHL	9	3	4	1	463	28	0	3.63	.879	—	—	—	—	—	—	—	—
2021–22	Texas Stars	AHL	6	2	4	0	353	15	0	2.55	.903	—	—	—	—	—	—	—	—
2022–23	Texas Stars	AHL	24	13	4	4	1329	64	0	2.89	.899	—	—	—	—	—	—	—	—
2022–23	Chicago Blackhawks	NHL	1	0	1	0	60	6	0	6.00	.786	—	—	—	—	—	—	—	—
2023–24	Sokol Krasnoyarsk	VHL	11	6	5	0	654	25	2	2.29	.929	—	—	—	—	—	—	—	—
2023–24	Sibir Novosibirsk	KHL	5	0	2	1	235	11	0	2.81	.900	—	—	—	—	—	—	—	—
NHL totals			260	114	92	33	14,362	603	11	2.52	.916	27	14	10	1,530	67	1	2.63	.919

=== International ===
Year	Team	Event	GP	W	L	T	MIN	GA	SO	GAA	SV%
2004	Russia	WJC18	6	4	0	2	360	13	0	2.17	.915
2005	Russia	WJC	5	3	2	0	264	12	0	2.73	.901
2006	Russia	WJC	5	4	1	0	300	11	0	2.20	.933
2015	Russia	WC	1	0	0	0	4	0	0	0.00	1.000
Junior totals			16	11	3	2	924	36	0	2.31	.927
Senior totals			1	0	0	0	4	0	0	0.00	1.000
