= Michal Rozsíval =

Czech ice hockey player (born 1978)

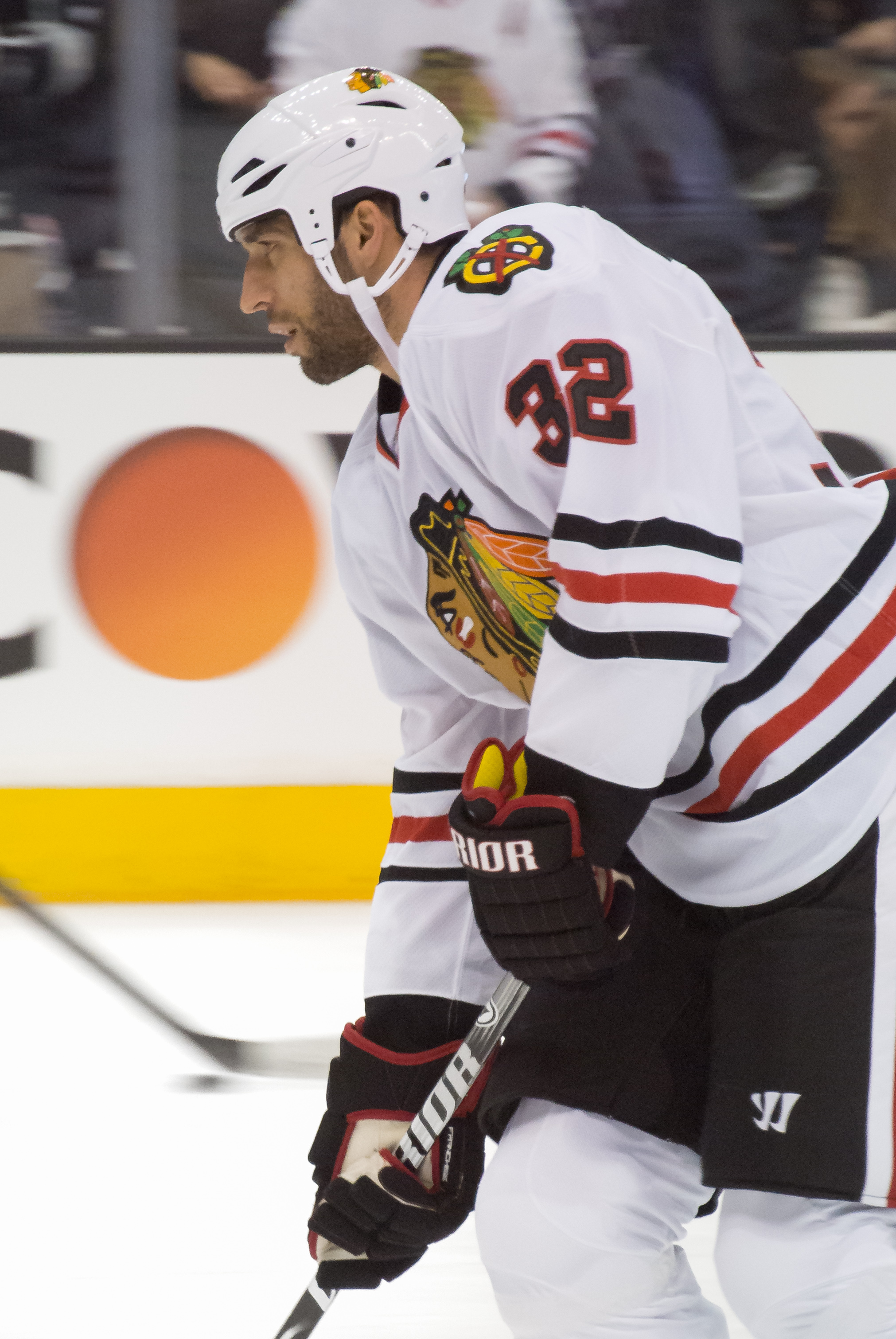
- Rozsíval with the Chicago Blackhawks in January 2013
- Born: 3 September 1978 (age 48) Vlašim, Czechoslovakia
- Height: 6 ft 1 in (185 cm)
- Weight: 210 lb (95 kg; 15 st 0 lb)
- Position: Defence
- Shot: Right
- Played for: Pittsburgh Penguins; Oceláři Třinec; Pardubice; New York Rangers; Phoenix Coyotes; Chicago Blackhawks
- National team: Czech Republic
- NHL draft: 105th overall, 1996; Pittsburgh Penguins
- Playing career: 1995–2017

Michal Rozsíval (Czech pronunciation: [ˈmɪxal ˈrossiːval]; born 3 September 1978) is a Czech former professional ice hockey defenceman. He last played for the Chicago Blackhawks of the National Hockey League (NHL). He joined the team in 2012, previously playing for the Pittsburgh Penguins from 1999 until 2004, the New York Rangers from 2005 to 2011, and the Phoenix Coyotes in 2011–12. He is a two time Stanley Cup winner with the Blackhawks in 2013 and 2015.

== Playing career ==
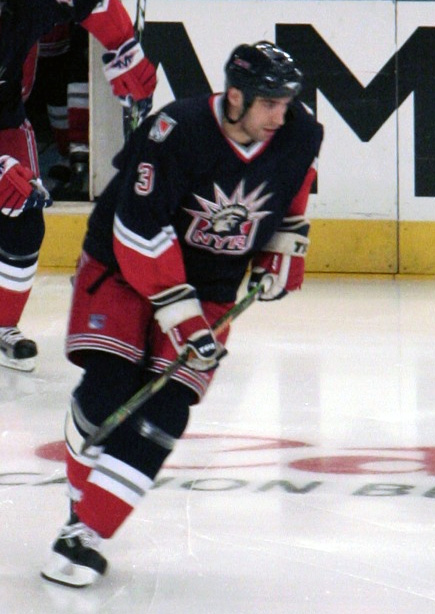
Rozsíval with the New York Rangers in April 2006

=== Pittsburgh Penguins ===
Rozsíval was drafted in the fourth round, 105th overall, by the Pittsburgh Penguins in the 1996 NHL entry draft. To adjust to North American play, he moved to Canada to play junior hockey with the Swift Current Broncos of the Western Hockey League (WHL). Before making his debut with the Penguins, he played for the Syracuse Crunch in the American Hockey League (AHL). He made his NHL debut in the 1999–2000 season.

=== New York Rangers ===
Rozsíval joined the New York Rangers after the 2004–05 NHL lockout as a free agent. On 29 April 2007, Rozsíval ended the Rangers' longest home playoff game since 1971 by scoring on Buffalo Sabres goaltender Ryan Miller at 16:43 of the second overtime period. In the 2007–08 season, Rozsíval led all defensemen in shorthanded goals, with two.

On 1 July 2008, Rozsíval signed a four-year contract extension with the Rangers worth a total of $20 million. On 22 February 2009, Rozsíval switched his jersey number to 33 when former Rangers' player Harry Howell had his number 3 retired.

=== Phoenix Coyotes ===
On 10 January 2011, Rozsíval was traded to the Phoenix Coyotes for Wojtek Wolski. He did not record any points during the Coyotes' run to the 2012 Western Conference Final against the Los Angeles Kings. He was injured on a play just seconds before Dustin Penner's overtime series winner after a hit from Dustin Brown, and had to be assisted off the ice.

=== Chicago Blackhawks ===
On 11 September 2012, Rozsíval was signed as a free agent by the Chicago Blackhawks on a one-year contract. The Blackhawks would win both the Presidents' Trophy and Stanley Cup during the lockout-shortened 2012–13 season, defeating the Boston Bruins 3–2 in six games during the finals. In game one of that series, Rozsíval shot a puck that deflected off Dave Bolland and Andrew Shaw into the net for the game-winning triple-overtime goal. Rozsíval was credited with an assist.

On 5 July 2013, Rozsíval signed a two-year contract extension to remain with the Blackhawks.

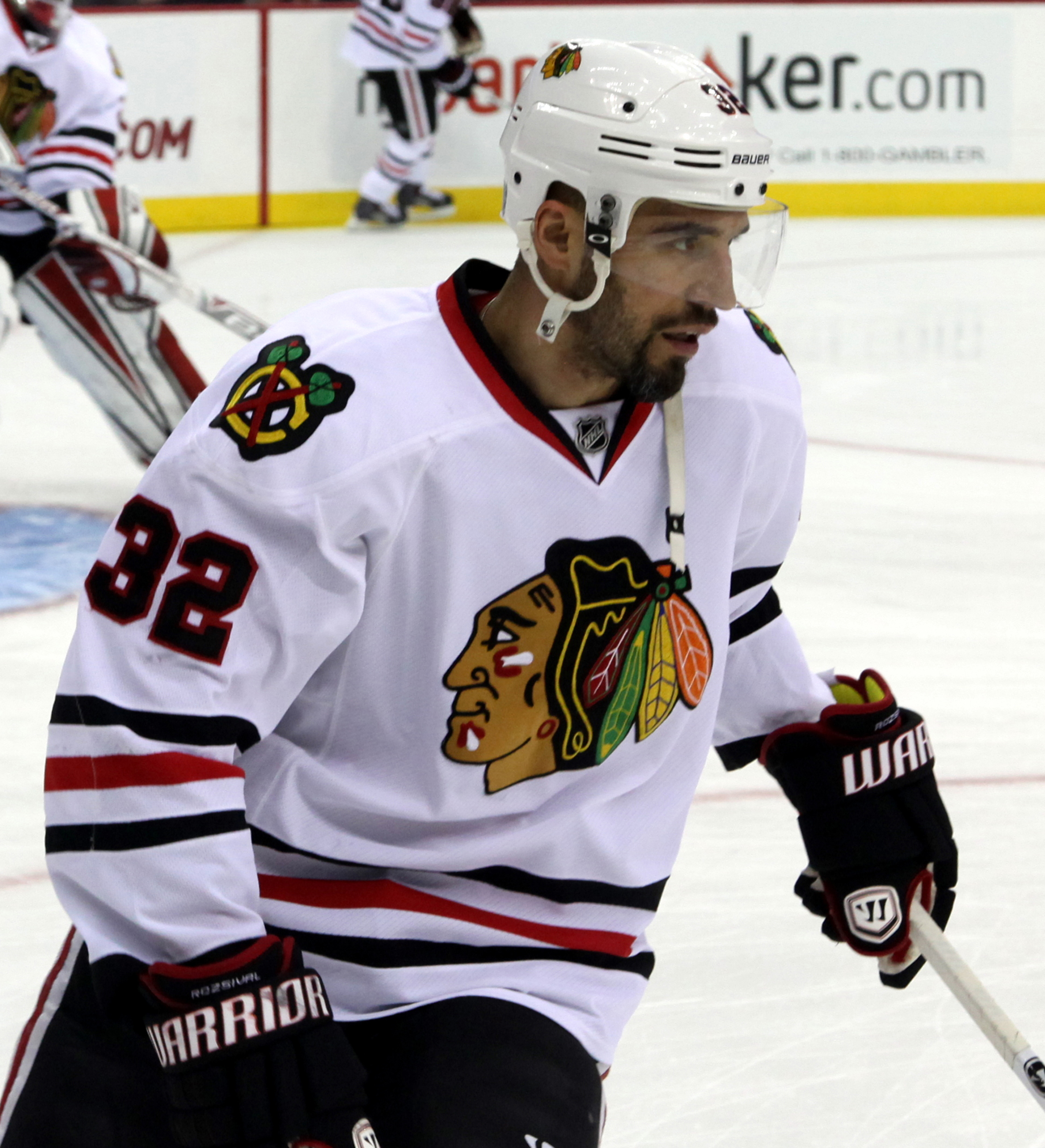
Rozsíval as a member of the Chicago Blackhawks in December 2014

Rozsíval recorded one goal and twelve assists over 65 games during the 2014–15 season. He appeared in ten games during the 2015 Stanley Cup Playoffs, but sustained a critical ankle injury during game four of the Blackhawks’ second round series against the Minnesota Wild. The injury required surgery and between 12 and 16 weeks of rehabilitation. The Blackhawks won the Stanley Cup that year and Rozsíval's name was engraved on the cup for a second time.

On 22 September 2015, Rozsíval signed a one-year contract extension with the Blackhawks. He made his 2015–16 debut for the Blackhawks on 14 November against the St. Louis Blues. In March 2016, the Professional Hockey Writers Association nominated Rozsival for the NHL's Masterton Trophy, which is awarded annually to the player who 'best exemplifies the qualities of perseverance, sportsmanship and dedication to ice hockey.'

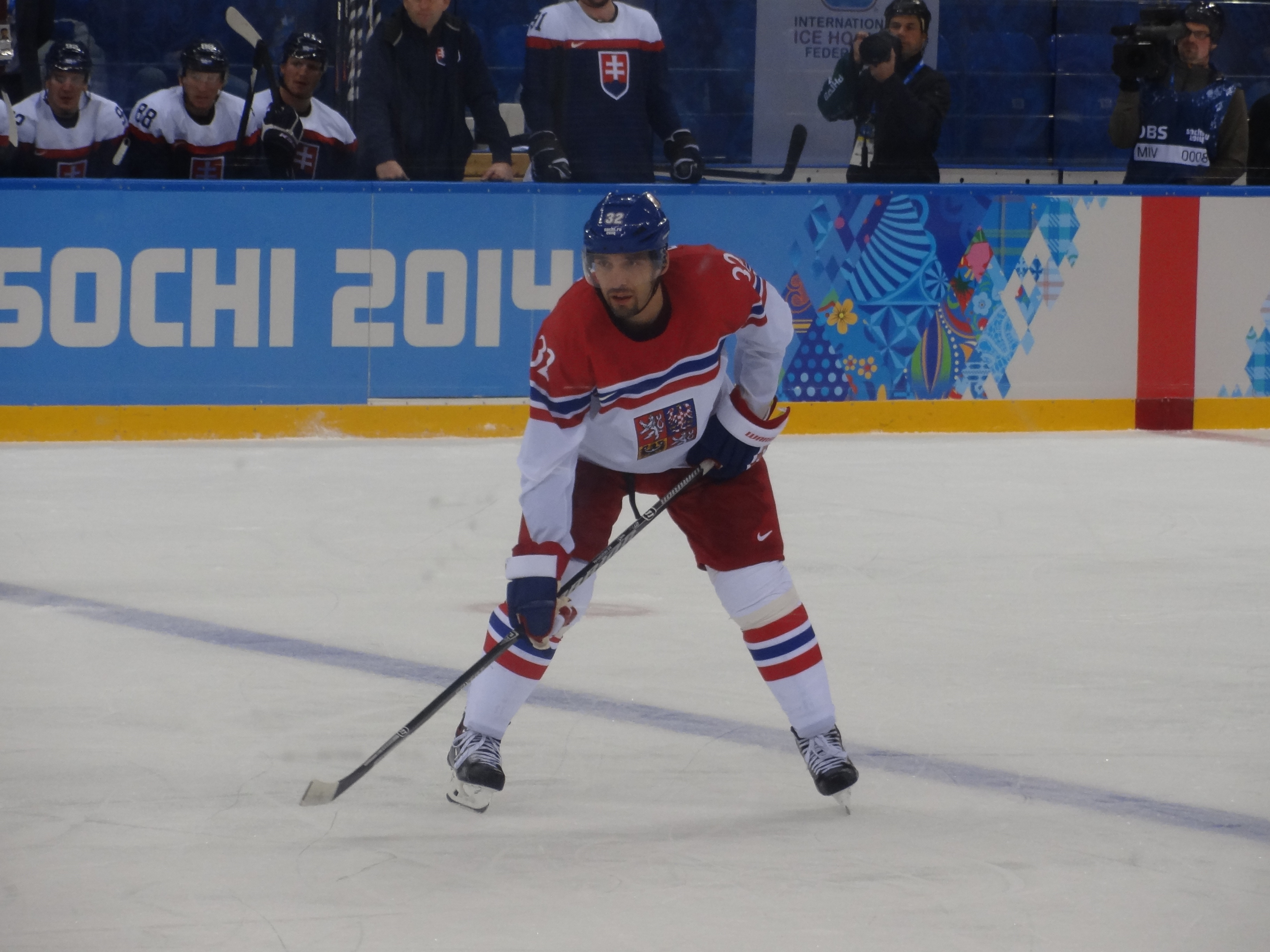

Medal record

Representing Czech Republic

World Championships
Gold medal – first place	2010 Cologne	

At the end of the 2015–16 season, Rozsival signed another one-year contract extension with the Blackhawks. On 28 February 2017, Chicago agreed to extend Rozsival's contract through the 2017–18 season. In the Blackhawks’ penultimate 2016–17 regular season game, Nick Ritchie of the Anaheim Ducks punched Rozsíval in the face as retaliation for a cross-check he delivered to Ducks winger Corey Perry. Rozsíval suffered a facial fracture that required surgical repairs. The NHL suspended Ritchie for two games (one regular season and one playoff game) on the basis that Ritchie's punch was unexpected and Rozsíval was not prepared to fight or defend himself. Rozsíval missed the Blackhawks 2016–17 finale and the entire 2017 playoffs due to the injury. He was later diagnosed with post-concussion symptoms and was placed on the Blackhawks long-term disabled list before the 2017–18 NHL season. He never played an NHL game again.

== Career statistics ==
=== Regular season and playoffs ===
			Regular season					Playoffs
Season	Team	League	GP	G	A	Pts	PIM	GP	G	A	Pts	PIM
1994–95	HC Dukla Jihlava	CZE U20	31	8	13	21	—	—	—	—	—	—
1995–96	HC Dukla Jihlava	CZE U20	36	3	4	7	—	—	—	—	—	—
1996–97	Swift Current Broncos	WHL	63	8	31	39	80	10	0	6	6	15
1997–98	Swift Current Broncos	WHL	71	14	55	69	122	12	0	5	5	33
1998–99	Syracuse Crunch	AHL	49	3	22	25	72	—	—	—	—	—
1999–2000	Pittsburgh Penguins	NHL	75	4	17	21	48	2	0	0	0	4
2000–01	Pittsburgh Penguins	NHL	30	1	4	5	26	—	—	—	—	—
2000–01	Wilkes–Barre/Scranton Penguins	AHL	29	8	8	16	32	—	—	—	—	—
2001–02	Pittsburgh Penguins	NHL	79	9	20	29	47	—	—	—	—	—
2002–03	Pittsburgh Penguins	NHL	53	4	6	10	40	—	—	—	—	—
2003–04	Wilkes–Barre/Scranton Penguins	AHL	1	0	0	0	2	—	—	—	—	—
2004–05	HC Oceláři Třinec	ELH	35	1	10	11	40	—	—	—	—	—
2004–05	HC Moeller Pardubice	ELH	16	1	3	4	30	16	1	2	3	34
2005–06	New York Rangers	NHL	82	5	25	30	90	4	0	1	1	8
2006–07	New York Rangers	NHL	80	10	30	40	52	10	3	4	7	10
2007–08	New York Rangers	NHL	80	13	25	38	80	10	1	5	6	10
2008–09	New York Rangers	NHL	76	8	22	30	52	7	0	0	0	4
2009–10	New York Rangers	NHL	82	3	20	23	78	—	—	—	—	—
2010–11	New York Rangers	NHL	32	3	12	15	22	—	—	—	—	—
2010–11	Phoenix Coyotes	NHL	33	3	3	6	20	4	0	0	0	2
2011–12	Phoenix Coyotes	NHL	54	1	12	13	34	15	0	0	0	2
2012–13	Chicago Blackhawks	NHL	27	0	12	12	14	23	0	4	4	16
2013–14	Chicago Blackhawks	NHL	42	1	7	8	32	17	1	5	6	8
2014–15	Chicago Blackhawks	NHL	65	1	12	13	22	10	0	1	1	6
2015–16	Chicago Blackhawks	NHL	51	1	12	13	33	4	0	0	0	2
2016–17	Chicago Blackhawks	NHL	22	1	2	3	14	—	—	—	—	—
NHL totals			963	68	241	309	704	106	5	20	25	72

=== International ===
Year	Team	Event	Result	GP	G	A	Pts	PIM
1996	Czech Republic	EJC18	5th	5	0	1	1	10
2008	Czech Republic	WC	5th	4	0	0	0	0
2010	Czech Republic	WC	1st place, gold medalist(s)	9	0	2	2	4
2014	Czech Republic	OG	6th	5	0	0	0	0
Junior totals				5	0	1	1	10
Senior totals				18	0	2	2	4

== Awards and honours ==
Award	Year
WHL
East First All-Star Team	1998
Bill Hunter Trophy	1998
CHL Second All-Star Team	1998
NHL
NHL Plus/Minus Award (joint winner)	2006
Stanley Cup (Chicago Blackhawks)	2013, 2015

== Personal life ==
Rozsival and his wife Jana have two sons: Daniel, currently playing for the Yellowjackets of University of Wisconsin–Superior and Dominik.

Awards and achievements
Preceded by Martin St. Louis & Marek Malík	Co-winner of the NHL Plus/Minus Award (with Wade Redden); 2006	Succeeded by Thomas Vanek
