= 2013 Stanley Cup Final =

2013 ice hockey championship series

	1	2	3	4	5	6	Total
Chicago Blackhawks	4***	1*	0	6*	3	3	4
Boston Bruins	3***	2*	2	5*	1	2	2
- * – Denotes overtime period(s)
- Location(s): Chicago: United Center (1, 2, 5); Boston: TD Garden (3, 4, 6)
- Coaches: Chicago: Joel Quenneville; Boston: Claude Julien
- Captains: Chicago: Jonathan Toews; Boston: Zdeno Chara
- National anthems: Chicago: Jim Cornelison; Boston: Rene Rancourt
- Referees: Brad Watson (1, 3, 5); Chris Rooney (1, 3, 5); Dan O'Halloran (2, 4, 6); Wes McCauley (2, 4, 6)
- Dates: June 12–24, 2013
- MVP: Patrick Kane (Blackhawks)
- Series-winning goal: Dave Bolland (19:01, third)
- Hall of Famers: Blackhawks: Marian Hossa (2020); Duncan Keith (2025); Bruins: Patrice Bergeron (2026); Zdeno Chara (2025)
- Networks: Canada: (English): CBC (French): RDS; United States: (English): NBC (1, 4–6), NBCSN (2–3)
- Announcers: (CBC) Jim Hughson, Craig Simpson, and Glenn Healy (RDS) Pierre Houde and Marc Denis (NBC/NBCSN) Mike Emrick, Eddie Olczyk, and Pierre McGuire (NHL International) Dave Strader and Joe Micheletti

The 2013 Stanley Cup Final was the championship series of the National Hockey League's (NHL) 2012–13 season, and the conclusion of the 2013 Stanley Cup playoffs. The Western Conference playoff champion Chicago Blackhawks defeated the Eastern Conference playoff champion Boston Bruins in six games to win their fifth Stanley Cup in team history. The Blackhawks also became just the eighth team to win both the Cup and the Presidents' Trophy (as the team with the best regular season record) in the same season. To date, they are the last team to win these two trophies in the same season. Chicago's Patrick Kane was awarded the Conn Smythe Trophy as the Most Valuable Player of the playoffs.

Due to a lockout that both shortened and delayed the start of the regular season, the 2013 Cup Finals began on June 12, and lasted until June 24–tying the lockout impacted 1995 and 2024 for the latest in June that the Stanley Cup was awarded. This was the first Stanley Cup Final series between two Original Six teams since 1979, and the seventh since its first expansion in 1967. It also marked the first time these two teams have met in the Stanley Cup Final.

In Game 6, while trailing the Bruins 2–1 with 76 seconds left in the third period, Chicago's Bryan Bickell and Dave Bolland scored two goals in 17 seconds to win the Cup for the Blackhawks. The win was the Blackhawks' second in four years, after also claiming the title in 2010. It was the first Finals series since 2004 to be tied after two games. It was also the first Stanley Cup Final since 1993 to feature three overtime games, including the fifth longest game in Finals history. This series is the last time to date that a Presidents' Trophy winner has won the Stanley Cup.

== Paths to the Finals ==
This was the first meeting between teams from Boston and Chicago for a major professional sports championship since Super Bowl XX in 1986, which featured the Chicago Bears and New England Patriots.

=== Boston Bruins ===
This was the Boston Bruins's nineteenth appearance in the Stanley Cup Final, a couple years removed from 2011, when they also faced the Presidents' Trophy winners, the Vancouver Canucks whom they defeated to win their sixth Cup championship.

The Bruins entered the season without the services of goalie Tim Thomas, the Conn Smythe Trophy winner during Boston's 2011 championship. It was announced on June 3, 2012, that he planned on taking a year off from hockey. Thomas was eventually traded to the New York Islanders on February 7, 2013. Tuukka Rask succeeded Thomas as the Bruins' starting goalie. Another of the Bruins' major trades was sending Benoit Pouliot to the Tampa Bay Lightning. Then on April 2, 2013, with about a month left in the lockout-shortened regular season, Boston acquired veteran Jaromir Jagr from the Dallas Stars.

Boston finished the lockout-shortened regular season with 62 points, finishing in second place in the Northeast Division, and the fourth seed in the Eastern Conference. Throughout the regular season, the Bruins and the Montreal Canadiens were neck-and-neck in the division, but the Bruins lost their last game to the Ottawa Senators, a contest that was postponed until the end of the regular season due to the Boston Marathon bombing. In the first round of the playoffs, Boston rallied from a 4–1 third period deficit in Game 7 to defeat the Toronto Maple Leafs in overtime. The Bruins then eliminated the New York Rangers in five games, and then swept the top seeded Pittsburgh Penguins in the Eastern Conference Final.

=== Chicago Blackhawks ===
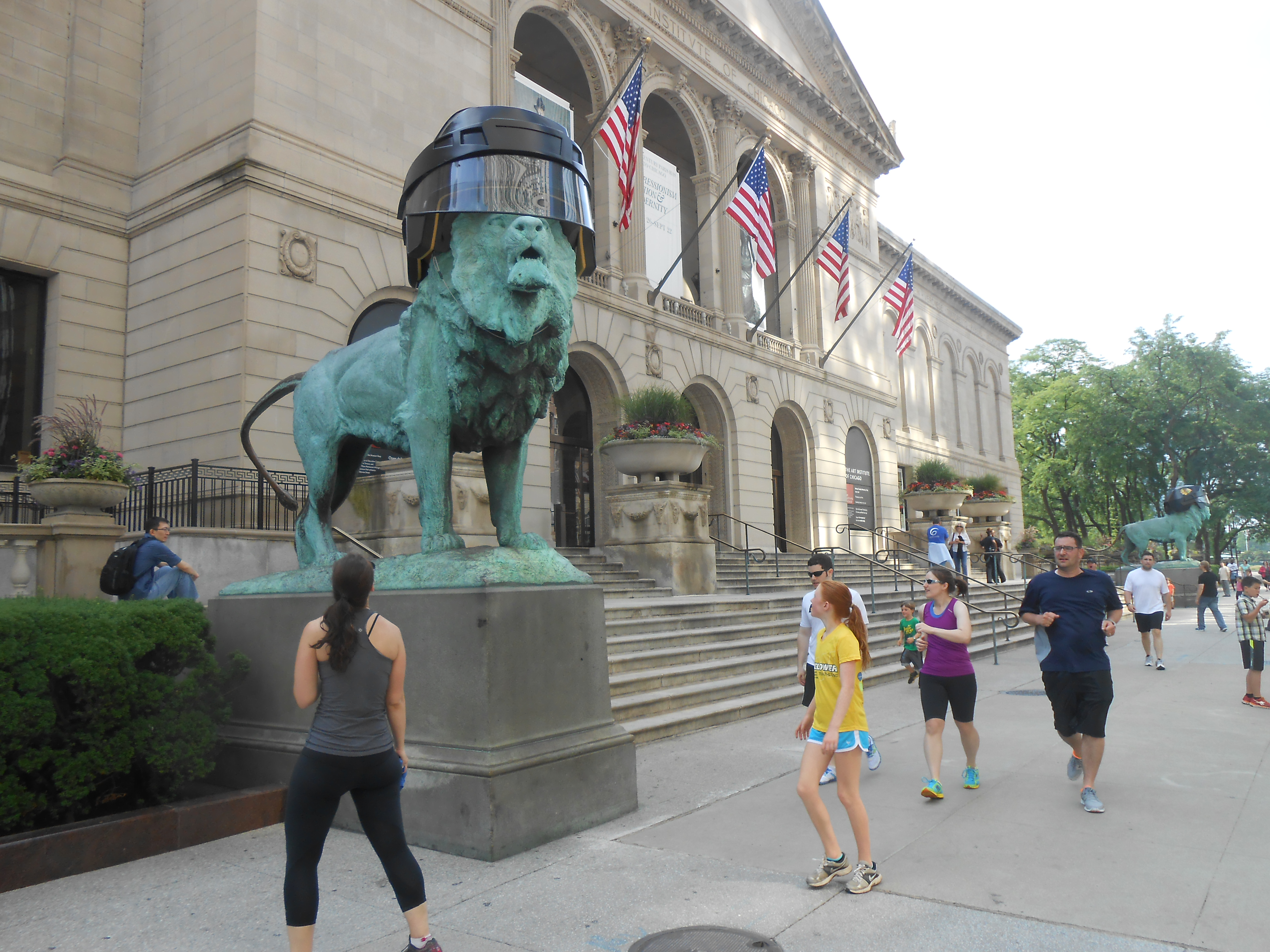
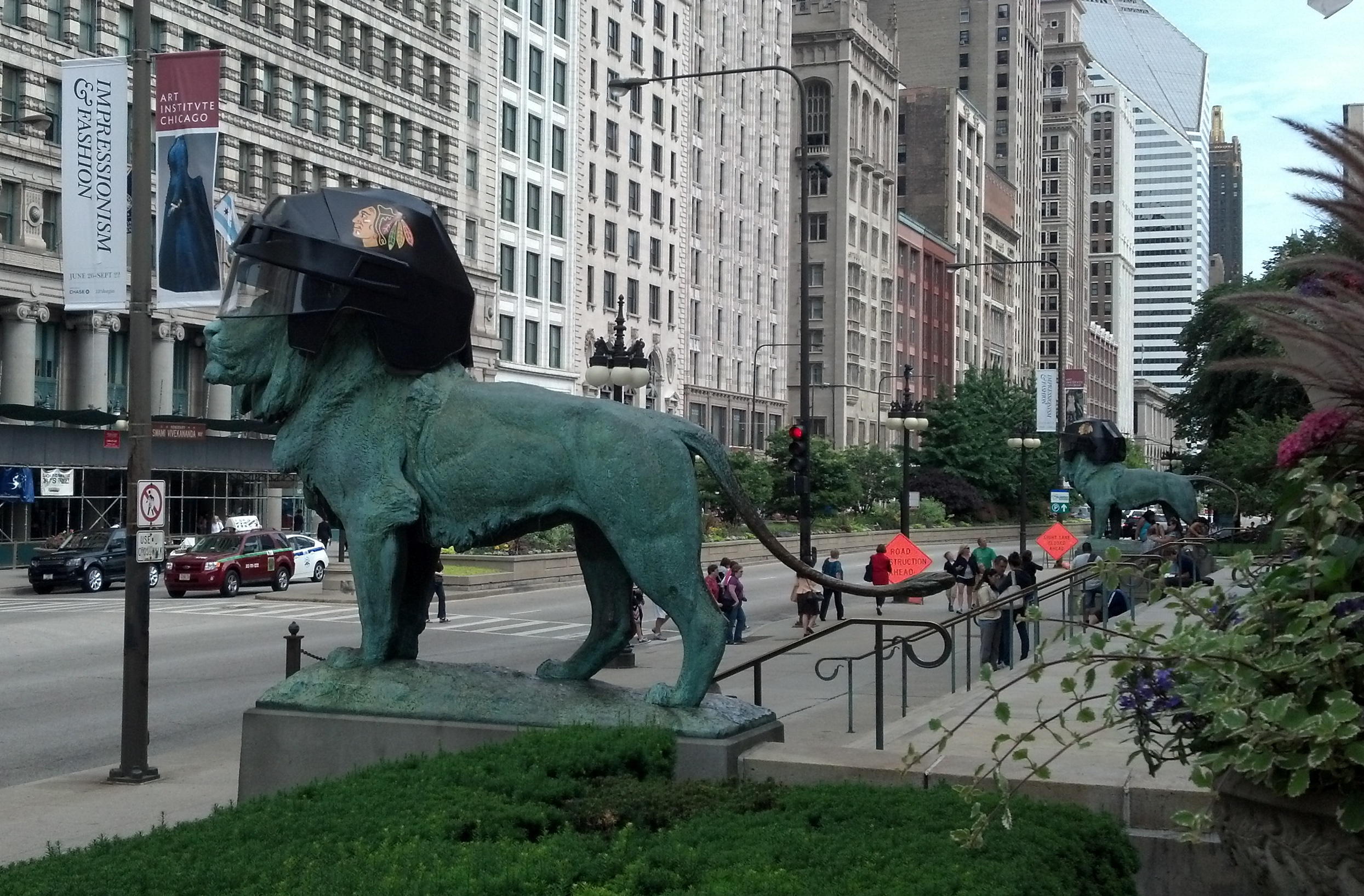
The lion sculptures outside of the Art Institute of Chicago decorated to celebrate the Chicago Blackhawks' postseason

This was the Chicago Blackhawks' twelfth appearance in the Stanley Cup Final. The Blackhawks sought their fifth Cup championship overall and their first since 2010. In both 2011 and 2012, the Blackhawks were eliminated in the first round of the playoffs by the Presidents' Trophy-winning Canucks and Phoenix Coyotes, respectively.

The Blackhawks began the lockout-shortened regular season by setting the NHL record for most games to start a season without a regulation loss (24), recording their first regulation loss in their 25th game of the season: a 6–2 defeat to the Colorado Avalanche. The Blackhawks finished the regular season with an NHL-best 77 points, winning their second Presidents' Trophy in team history. In the first round of the playoffs, the Blackhawks defeated the Minnesota Wild in five games. In the next round, Chicago came back from a 3–1 series deficit to defeat the Detroit Red Wings in overtime of Game 7. In the Western Conference Final, the Blackhawks defeated the defending Stanley Cup champion Los Angeles Kings in five games.

== Game summaries ==
Number in parentheses represents the player's total in goals or assists to that point of the entire four rounds of the playoffs

=== Game one ===
June 12	Boston Bruins	3–4	3OT	Chicago Blackhawks	United Center	Recap

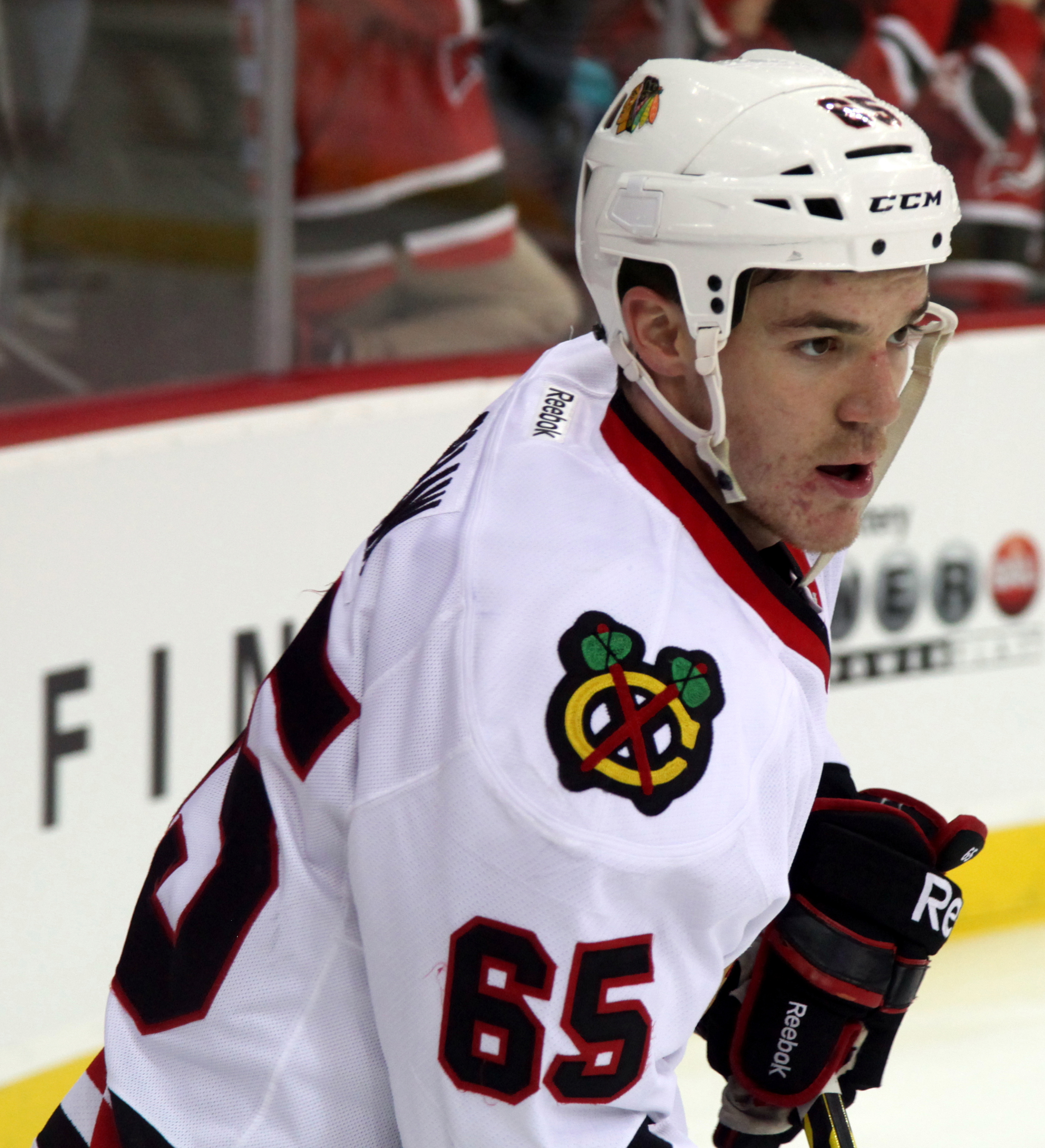
Andrew Shaw scored two points, including the game-winning goal in triple-overtime of Game 1.

The Blackhawks rallied from a 3–1 third period deficit in game one to defeat the Bruins in triple-overtime, 4–3. This was the 24th longest NHL overtime game, and the fifth longest in the history of the Stanley Cup Final. Milan Lucic scored at 13:11 of the first period and 51 seconds into the second period to give the Bruins a 2–0 lead. At 3:08 of the second period, Chicago rookie Brandon Saad scored his first career playoff goal, ending Boston goalie Tuukka Rask's shutout streak of 149:36, and cutting Boston's lead to 2–1. Chicago then had a 5-on-3 for 1:17 midway through the second period, but could not get a shot on goal. The Bruins then increased their lead to 3–1 when Patrice Bergeron scored a power-play goal at 06:09 of the third period. But Dave Bolland and Johnny Oduya scored in 4:14 apart to tie the game. In the overtime periods, the Blackhawks were penalized twice for too many men on the ice, but Boston was unable to score on those two ensuing power-plays. The game finally ended at 12:08 of the third overtime period when Michal Rozsival's shot from the point deflected off of Bolland, then Andrew Shaw, and past Rask into the Boston net.

Scoring summary
Period	Team	Goal	Assist(s)	Time	Score
1st	BOS	Milan Lucic (4)	Nathan Horton (11) and David Krejci (13)	13:11	1–0 BOS
2nd	BOS	Milan Lucic (5)	David Krejci (14)	00:51	2–0 BOS
2nd	CHI	Brandon Saad (1)	Marian Hossa (8)	03:08	2–1 BOS
3rd	BOS	Patrice Bergeron (6) – pp	Tyler Seguin (4) and Milan Lucic (11)	06:09	3–1 BOS
3rd	CHI	Dave Bolland (1)	Andrew Shaw (4)	08:00	3–2 BOS
3rd	CHI	Johnny Oduya (3)	Marcus Kruger (2) and Michael Frolik (4)	12:14	3–3
OT	None				
2OT	None				
3OT	CHI	Andrew Shaw (5)	Dave Bolland (2) and Michal Rozsival (2)	12:08	4–3 CHI
Penalty summary
Period	Team	Player	Penalty	Time	PIM
1st	None				
2nd
2nd	BOS	Nathan Horton	Interference	07:37	2:00
2nd	BOS	Bench (served by Shawn Thornton)	Too many men on the ice	08:20	2:00
2nd	BOS	Zdeno Chara	High-sticking	12:53	2:00
3rd
3rd	CHI	Michael Frolik	Tripping	05:51	2:00
OT
OT	CHI	Bench (served by Patrick Sharp)	Too many men on the ice	12:08	2:00
2OT
2OT	CHI	Bench (served by Andrew Shaw)	Too many men on the ice	19:07	2:00
3OT	None				

Shots by period
Team	1	2	3	OT	2OT	3OT	Total
Boston	11	6	8	12	10	7	54
Chicago	8	16	15	8	10	6	63

=== Game two ===
June 15	Boston Bruins	2–1	OT	Chicago Blackhawks	United Center	Recap

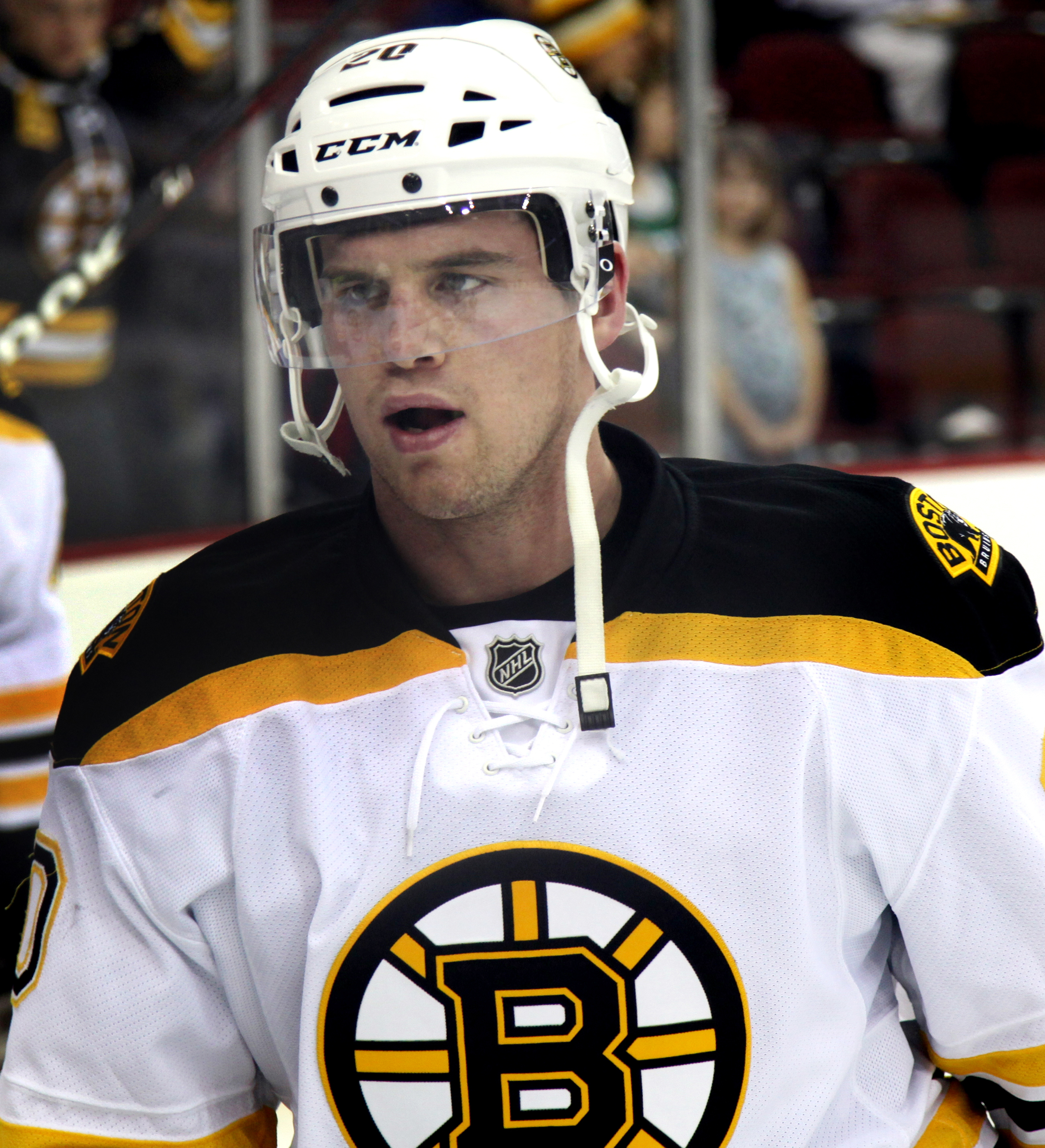
Daniel Paille scored two points, including the game-winning goal in overtime of Game 2.

The Bruins tied the series with a 2–1 overtime victory in game two. This was the third consecutive overtime game for the Blackhawks (dating back to the conference finals), and the second consecutive Cup Finals in which the first two games went into overtime. In the first period, Chicago had 19 shots on goal compared to Boston's 4, but only scored on Patrick Sharp's goal at 11:22. Seventy seconds later, a goal by the Blackhawks' Marian Hossa was disallowed after officials blew the play dead prior to the puck crossing the Bruins' goal line. Boston's Chris Kelly then scored his first goal of the playoffs at 14:58 of the second period to tie the game. After a scoreless third period, Daniel Paille won the game for the Bruins at 13:48 of overtime; the Blackhawks' Brent Seabrook sent the puck around the end boards in the Chicago zone, but Brandon Bollig could not push it out to centre ice, allowing Adam McQuaid to steal the loose puck and feed it to Tyler Seguin, who then passed it to Paille.

Scoring summary
Period	Team	Goal	Assist(s)	Time	Score
1st	CHI	Patrick Sharp (9)	Patrick Kane (9) and Michal Handzus (8)	11:22	1–0 CHI
2nd	BOS	Chris Kelly (1)	Daniel Paille (4)	14:58	1–1
3rd	None				
OT	BOS	Daniel Paille (3)	Tyler Seguin (5) and Adam McQuaid (2)	13:48	2–1 BOS
Penalty summary
Period	Team	Player	Penalty	Time	PIM
1st
1st	BOS	Andrew Ference	Tripping	06:51	2:00
2nd
2nd	CHI	Dave Bolland	Tripping	01:19	2:00
2nd	BOS	Johnny Boychuk	Holding	08:15	2:00
2nd	BOS	Dennis Seidenberg	Tripping	17:11	2:00
2nd	CHI	Johnny Oduya	Tripping	19:14	2:00
3rd	None				
OT	None				

Shots by period
Team	1	2	3	OT	Total
Boston	4	8	8	8	28
Chicago	19	4	5	6	34

=== Game three ===
June 17	Chicago Blackhawks	0–2	Boston Bruins	TD Garden	Recap

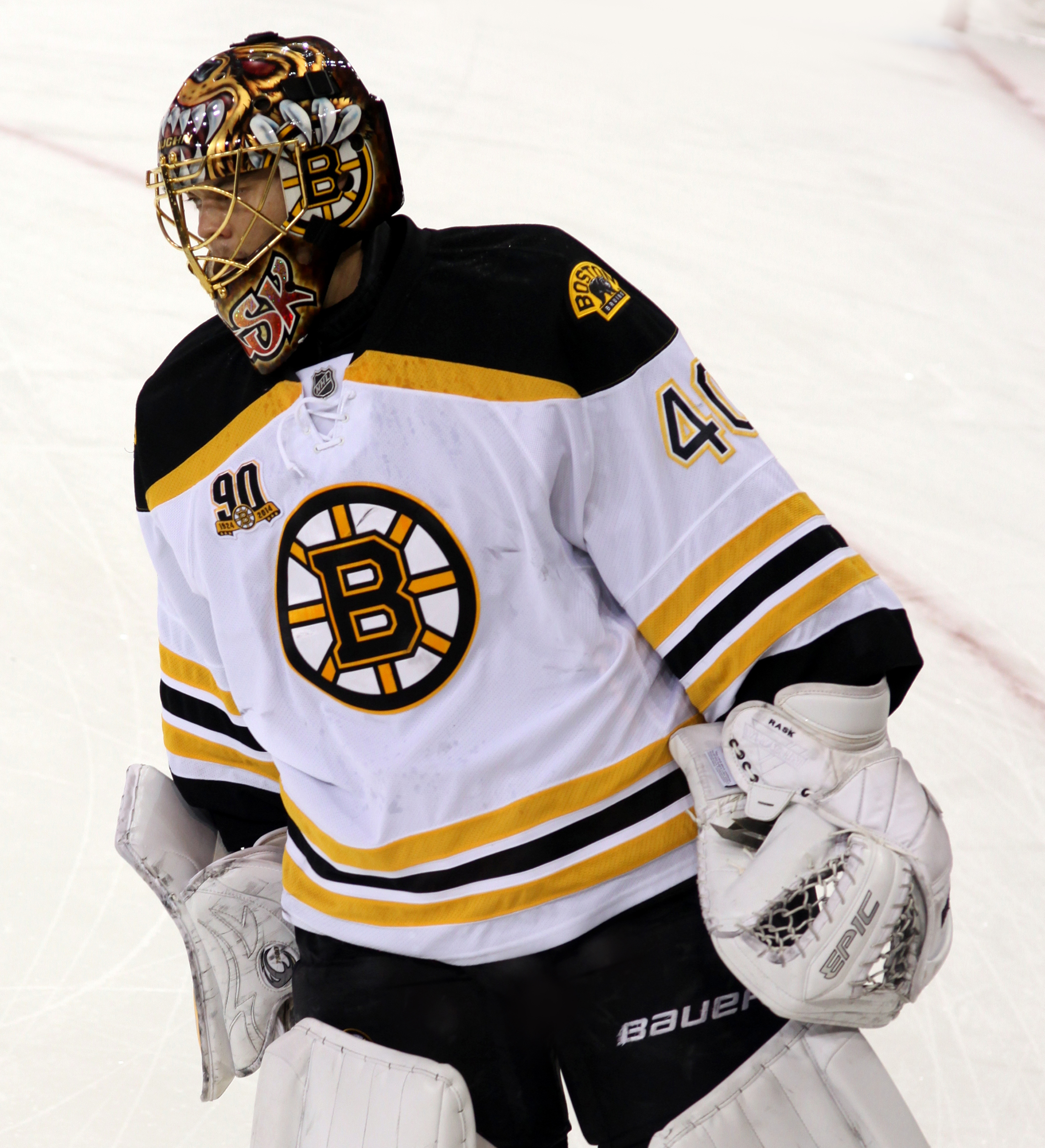
Tuukka Rask recorded a 28-save shutout in Game 3.

Boston goalie Tuukka Rask stopped all 28 Chicago shots in the Bruins' 2–0 victory in game three. Daniel Paille scored Boston's first goal at 02:13 of the second period. Patrice Bergeron then scored a power play goal at 14:05 of the second period, just seconds after the Bruins' 5-on-3 advantage expired. The Blackhawks' Marian Hossa was scratched from the game; Chicago head coach Joel Quenneville later said after the game that Hossa did not play due to an upper-body injury.

Scoring summary
Period	Team	Goal	Assist(s)	Time	Score
1st	None				
2nd	BOS	Daniel Paille (4)	Chris Kelly (1) and Tyler Seguin (6)	02:13	1–0 BOS
2nd	BOS	Patrice Bergeron (7) – pp	Jaromir Jagr (8) and Zdeno Chara (10)	14:05	2–0 BOS
3rd	None				
Penalty summary
Period	Team	Player	Penalty	Time	PIM
1st
1st	BOS	Kaspars Daugavins	Roughing	09:57	2:00
1st	BOS	Shawn Thornton	Roughing	14:15	2:00
2nd
2nd	CHI	Dave Bolland	Cross-checking	12:00	2:00
2nd	CHI	Niklas Hjalmarsson	Tripping	13:50	2:00
2nd	CHI	Dave Bolland	Tripping	19:00	2:00
3rd
3rd	BOS	Adam McQuaid	Tripping	07:56	2:00
3rd	CHI	Dave Bolland	Tripping	13:55	2:00
3rd	BOS	David Krejci	Hooking	15:55	2:00
3rd	CHI	Bryan Bickell	Roughing	19:48	2:00
3rd	BOS	Zdeno Chara	Roughing – double minor	19:48	4:00
3rd	BOS	Brad Marchand	Fighting – major	19:48	5:00
3rd	CHI	Andrew Shaw	Fighting – major	19:48	5:00

Shots by period
Team	1	2	3	Total
Chicago	10	8	10	28
Boston	11	15	9	35

=== Game four ===
June 19	Chicago Blackhawks	6–5	OT	Boston Bruins	TD Garden	Recap

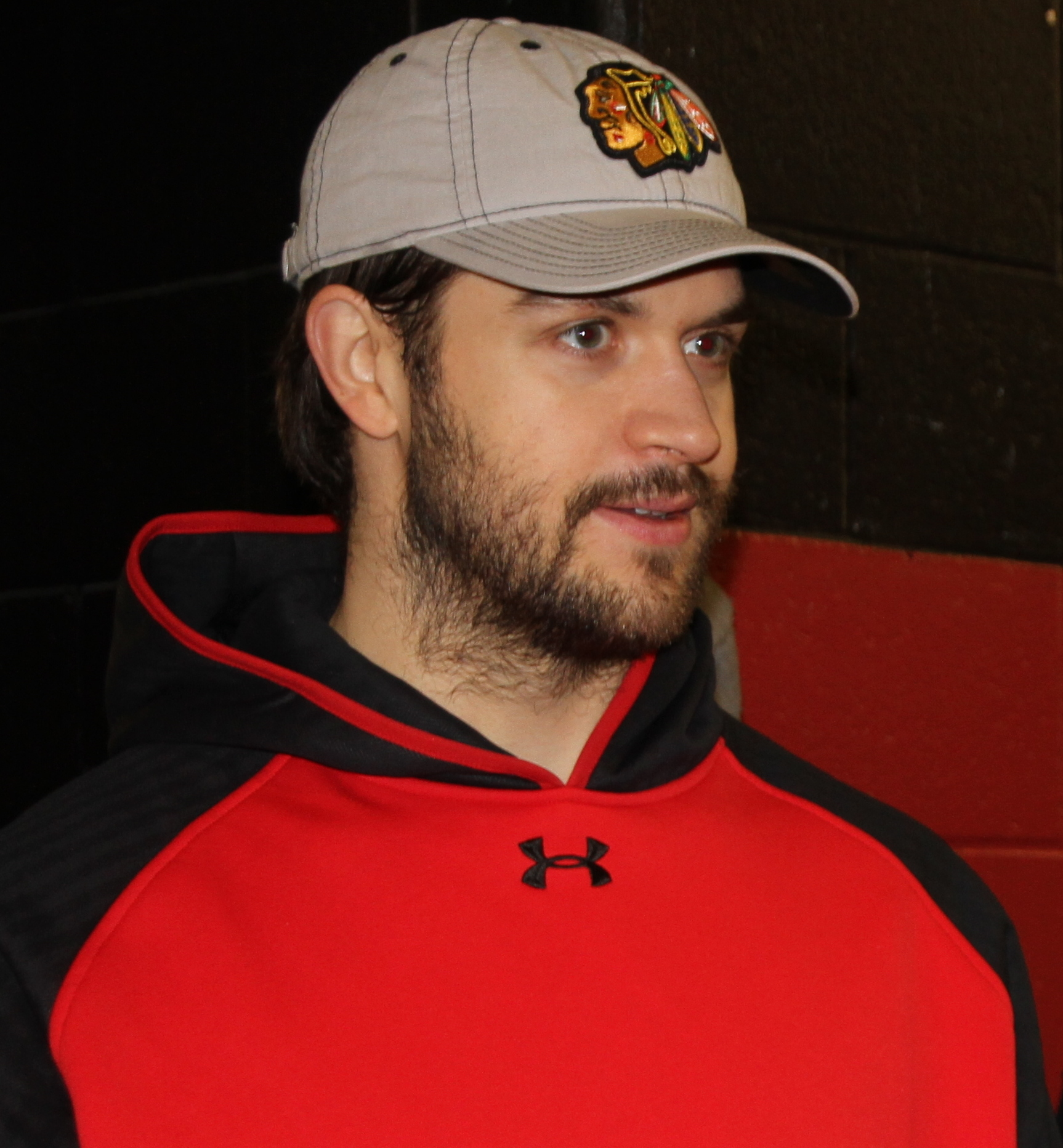
Brent Seabrook scored the game-winning goal in overtime of Game 4.

After only 12 total goals were scored in the first three games, game four featured a series high 11 total goals. In the first period, Chicago's Michal Handzus scored a short-handed goal at 06:48 before Boston's Rich Peverley tied the game on a power play goal at 14:43. Five total goals were then scored in the second period. Jonathan Toews deflected Michal Rozsival's shot into the Boston net at 6:48 to give the Blackhawks a 2–1 lead. Chicago then scored again at 8:41: Bryan Bickell's shot was stopped by Tuukka Rask, but Patrick Kane grabbed the rebound from the other side and shot it into the net before the Boston goalie could recover. Milan Lucic cut the lead, 3–2, at 14:43 after shooting a rebound past Chicago goalie Corey Crawford, but Chicago scored right back at 15:32 with Marcus Kruger's goal on a 2-on-1 breakaway. At 17:22, the Bruins scored their second power play goal after Zdeno Chara's shot deflected over the net, hit the glass, then eventually bounced into the crease where Patrice Bergeron tapped it into the net before Crawford could find the puck. In the third period, Bergeron tied the game, 4–4, at 2:05. The Blackhawks then scored their first power play goal of the series with Patrick Sharp's score at 11:19, but Boston answered 55 seconds later with Johnny Boychuk's equalizer. At 09:51 of overtime, Brent Seabrook scored from the point through traffic to give the Blackhawks a 6–5 victory in game four to even the series at 2. All five Bruins goals were shot to the glove side of Crawford, but the Blackhawks never once trailed in this game.

Scoring summary
Period	Team	Goal	Assist(s)	Time	Score
1st	CHI	Michal Handzus (3) – sh	Brandon Saad (5)	06:48	1–0 CHI
1st	BOS	Rich Peverley (2) – pp	Andrew Ference (2)	14:43	1–1
2nd	CHI	Jonathan Toews (2)	Michal Rozsival (3)	06:33	2–1 CHI
2nd	CHI	Patrick Kane (7)	Bryan Bickell (6) and Michal Rozsival (4)	08:41	3–1 CHI
2nd	BOS	Milan Lucic (6)	Zdeno Chara (11)	14:43	3–2 CHI
2nd	CHI	Marcus Kruger (3)	Michael Frolik (5) and Dave Bolland (3)	15:32	4–2 CHI
2nd	BOS	Patrice Bergeron (8) – pp	Zdeno Chara (12) and Jaromir Jagr (9)	17:22	4–3 CHI
3rd	BOS	Patrice Bergeron (9)	Jaromir Jagr (10)	02:05	4–4
3rd	CHI	Patrick Sharp (10) – pp	Marian Hossa (9) and Duncan Keith (10)	11:19	5–4 CHI
3rd	BOS	Johnny Boychuk (6)	Nathan Horton (12) and David Krejci (15)	12:14	5–5 TIE
OT	CHI	Brent Seabrook (3)	Bryan Bickell (7) and Patrick Kane (10)	09:51	6–5 CHI
Penalty summary
Period	Team	Player	Penalty	Time	PIM
1st
1st	CHI	Johnny Oduya	Interference	05:18	2:00
1st	CHI	Duncan Keith	Hooking	12:45	2:00
1st	CHI	Andrew Shaw	Roughing	12:45	2:00
1st	BOS	Chris Kelly	Roughing	12:45	2:00
1st	BOS	Nathan Horton	Slashing	18:16	2:00
1st	CHI	Duncan Keith	Tripping	18:58	2:00
2nd
2nd	BOS	Bench (served by Shawn Thornton)	Too many men on the ice	09:58	2:00
2nd	CHI	Patrick Kane	Hooking	16:24	2:00
3rd
3rd	CHI	Jonathan Toews	High-sticking	08:51	2:00
3rd	BOS	Jaromir Jagr	High-sticking	09:13	2:00
3rd	BOS	David Krejci	Hooking	10:20	2:00
OT	None				

Shots by period
Team	1	2	3	OT	Total
Chicago	12	13	16	6	47
Boston	9	11	8	5	33

=== Game five ===
June 22	Boston Bruins	1–3	Chicago Blackhawks	United Center	Recap

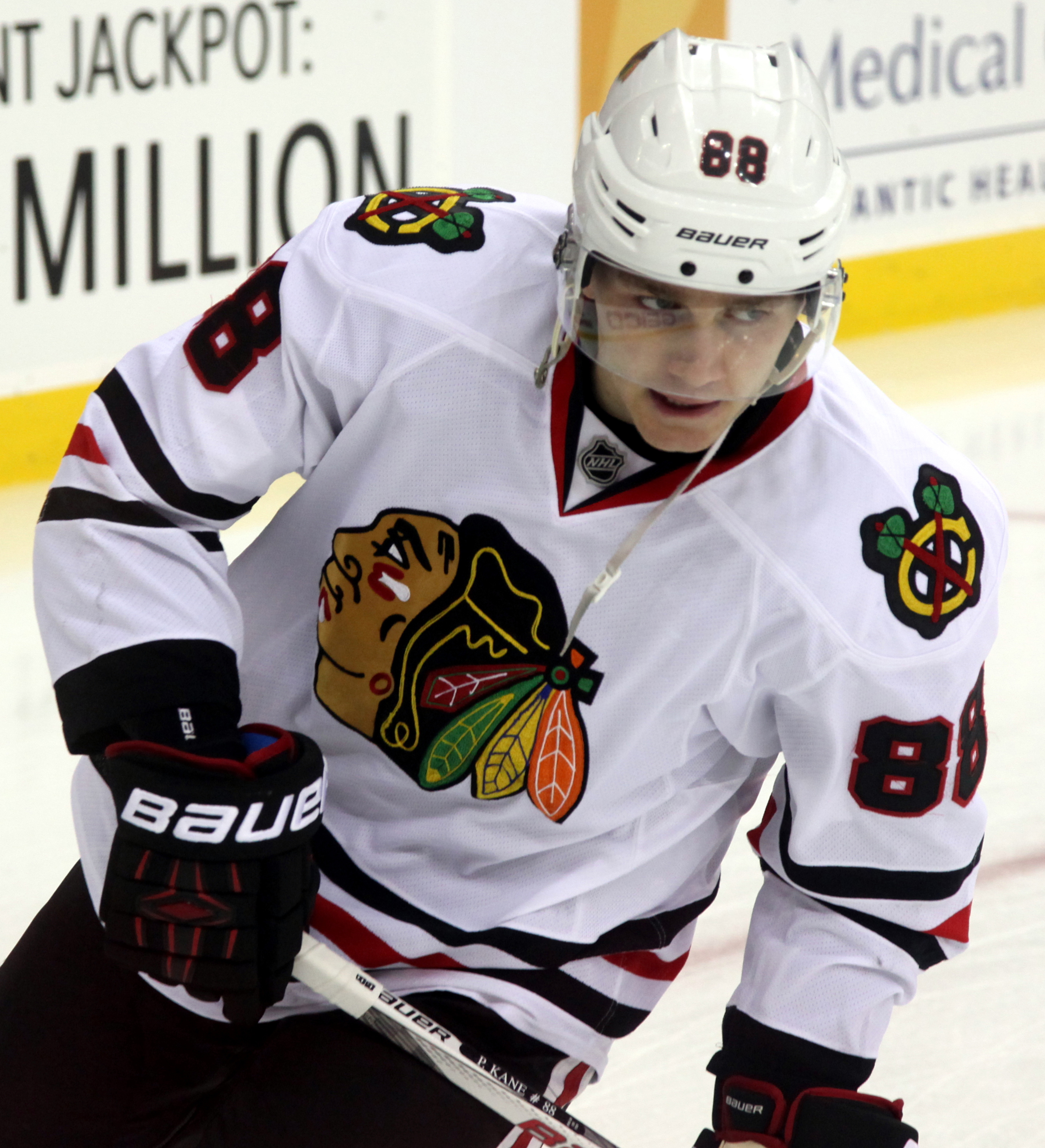
Patrick Kane scored twice, including the game-winning goal, in Game 5.

Patrick Kane scored two goals in the Blackhawks' 3–1 victory in game five. Chicago built a 2–0 lead with Kane's goals at 17:27 of the first period and 05:13 of the second. Boston's Zdeno Chara cut the score to 2–1 at 03:40 of the third period, but Chicago goalie Corey Crawford stopped 24 of 25 Bruins shots, and Dave Bolland added an empty net goal in the waning seconds of the game. Boston's Patrice Bergeron left the game in the second period and was later taken to the hospital for observation, while Chicago's Jonathan Toews suffered an upper body injury and did not play in the third period.

Scoring summary
Period	Team	Goal	Assist(s)	Time	Score
1st	CHI	Patrick Kane (8)	Johnny Oduya (4) and Jonathan Toews (9)	17:27	1–0 CHI
2nd	CHI	Patrick Kane (9)	Bryan Bickell (8) and Jonathan Toews (10)	05:13	2–0 CHI
3rd	BOS	Zdeno Chara (3)	David Krejci (16) and Milan Lucic (12)	03:40	2–1 CHI
3rd	CHI	Dave Bolland (2) – en	Michael Frolik (6)	19:46	3–1 CHI
Penalty summary
Period	Team	Player	Penalty	Time	PIM
1st
1st	CHI	Patrick Sharp	Roughing	17:56	2:00
1st	BOS	Johnny Boychuk	Roughing	17:56	2:00
2nd
2nd	BOS	Nathan Horton	Hooking	00:49	2:00
2nd	CHI	Michal Handzus	Embellishment	00:49	2:00
2nd	BOS	Dennis Seidenberg	Boarding	05:59	2:00
2nd	BOS	Adam McQuaid	Roughing	15:20	2:00
3rd	None				

Shots by period
Team	1	2	3	Total
Boston	11	5	9	25
Chicago	8	11	13	32

=== Game six ===
June 24	Chicago Blackhawks	3–2	Boston Bruins	TD Garden	Recap

External videos
- Game 6 Full replay (NHL International's feed) on the NHL's official YouTube channel

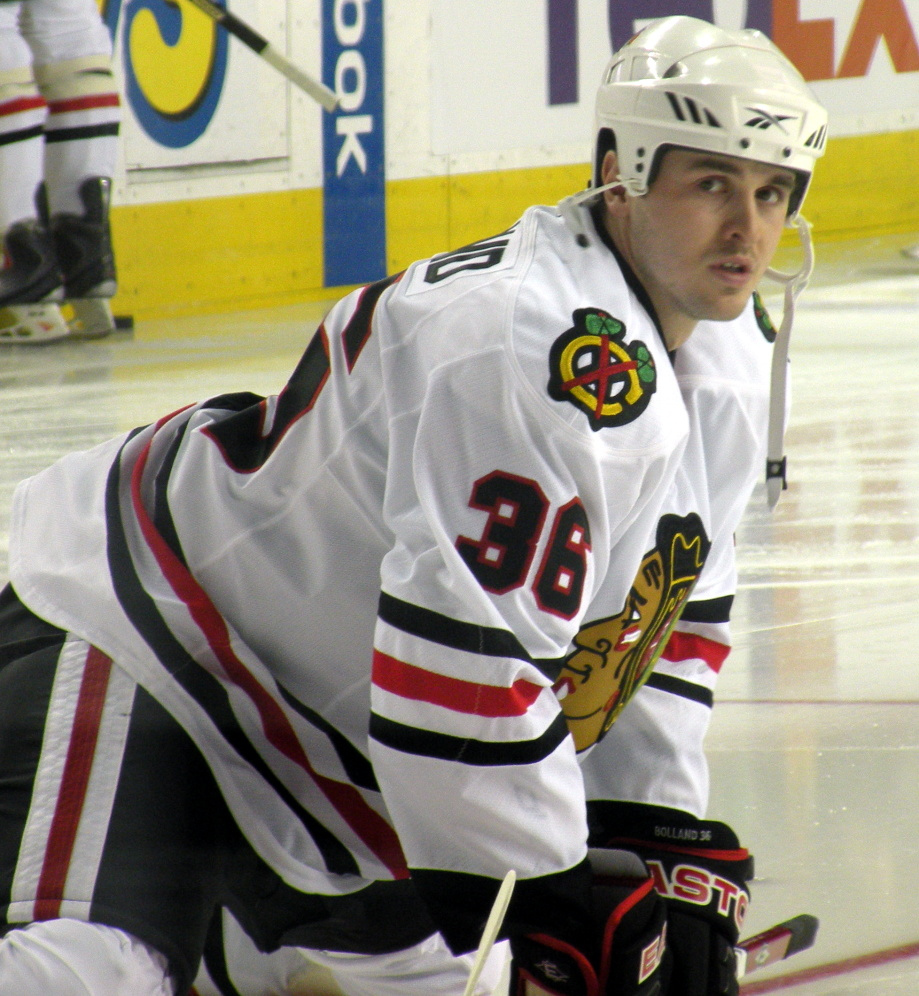
Dave Bolland scored the Stanley Cup-clinching goal in the final minute of Game 6.

With Chicago holding a 3–2 series lead heading into game six, the desperate Bruins outshot the Blackhawks 12–6 in the first period, with the Bruins ending the period up 1–0 due to Chris Kelly's goal. However, Chicago would fight back in the second period, as Blackhawks captain Jonathan Toews scored on a breakaway while shorthanded to tie the game (Toews' goal would be recorded as an even strength goal, as it entered the net just after Andrew Shaw's penalty expired). The teams entered the third period with the game tied 1–1. However, Milan Lucic would score at 12:11 of the third period to put the Bruins in front again. With the Bruins clinging onto a 2–1 lead late in the third period, the Blackhawks pulled goalie Corey Crawford for the extra attacker. This resulted in Bryan Bickell scoring the game-tying goal with 76 seconds remaining in the game on a feed from Jonathan Toews. Thus, with the score tied 2–2, it appeared the Finals would go to overtime for the fourth time. However, only 17 seconds after Bickell's goal, Dave Bolland scored what proved to be the series-winning goal, as the Bruins were unable to get an equalizer in the final minute with goalie Tuukka Rask on the bench. Bolland's goal at 19:01 of the third period broke the record for the latest Stanley Cup game-winner scored in regulation.

Scoring summary
Period	Team	Goal	Assist(s)	Time	Score
1st	BOS	Chris Kelly (2)	Tyler Seguin (7) and Daniel Paille (5)	07:19	1–0 BOS
2nd	CHI	Jonathan Toews (3)	Unassisted	04:24	1–1 TIE
3rd	BOS	Milan Lucic (7)	David Krejci (17)	12:11	2–1 BOS
3rd	CHI	Bryan Bickell (9)	Jonathan Toews (11) and Duncan Keith (11)	18:44	2–2 TIE
3rd	CHI	Dave Bolland (3)	Michael Frolik (7) and Johnny Oduya (5)	19:01	3–2 CHI
Penalty summary
Period	Team	Player	Penalty	Time	PIM
1st
1st	CHI	Johnny Oduya	Hooking	10:40	2:00
1st	CHI	Michal Rozsival	High-sticking	18:25	2:00
2nd
2nd	CHI	Andrew Shaw	Roughing	02:24	2:00
2nd	CHI	Brent Seabrook	Tripping	05:12	2:00
2nd	BOS	Tyler Seguin	Hooking	13:57	2:00
3rd
3rd	BOS	Chris Kelly	High-sticking	14:21	2:00

Shots by period
Team	1	2	3	Total
Chicago	6	9	16	31
Boston	12	6	7	25

== Officials ==
Referees: Wes McCauley (Canada), Dan O'Halloran (Canada), Chris Rooney (United States), Brad Watson (Canada)

Linesmen: Shane Heyer (Canada), Brian Murphy (United States), Pierre Racicot (Canada), Jay Sharrers (Canada)

== Television ==
In Canada, the series was televised in English on CBC and in French on the cable network RDS. The NBC Sports Group's coverage in the United States was different from previous seasons: the NBC broadcast network televised game one and then the final four games, while the NBC Sports Network broadcast games two and three.

U.S. Ratings
Game	NBC/NBCSN viewership (in millions)
1	6.358
2	3.964
3	4.001
4	6.459
5	5.632
6	8.160

== Team rosters ==
Years indicated in boldface under the "Finals appearance" column signify that the player won the Stanley Cup in the given year.

=== Boston Bruins ===
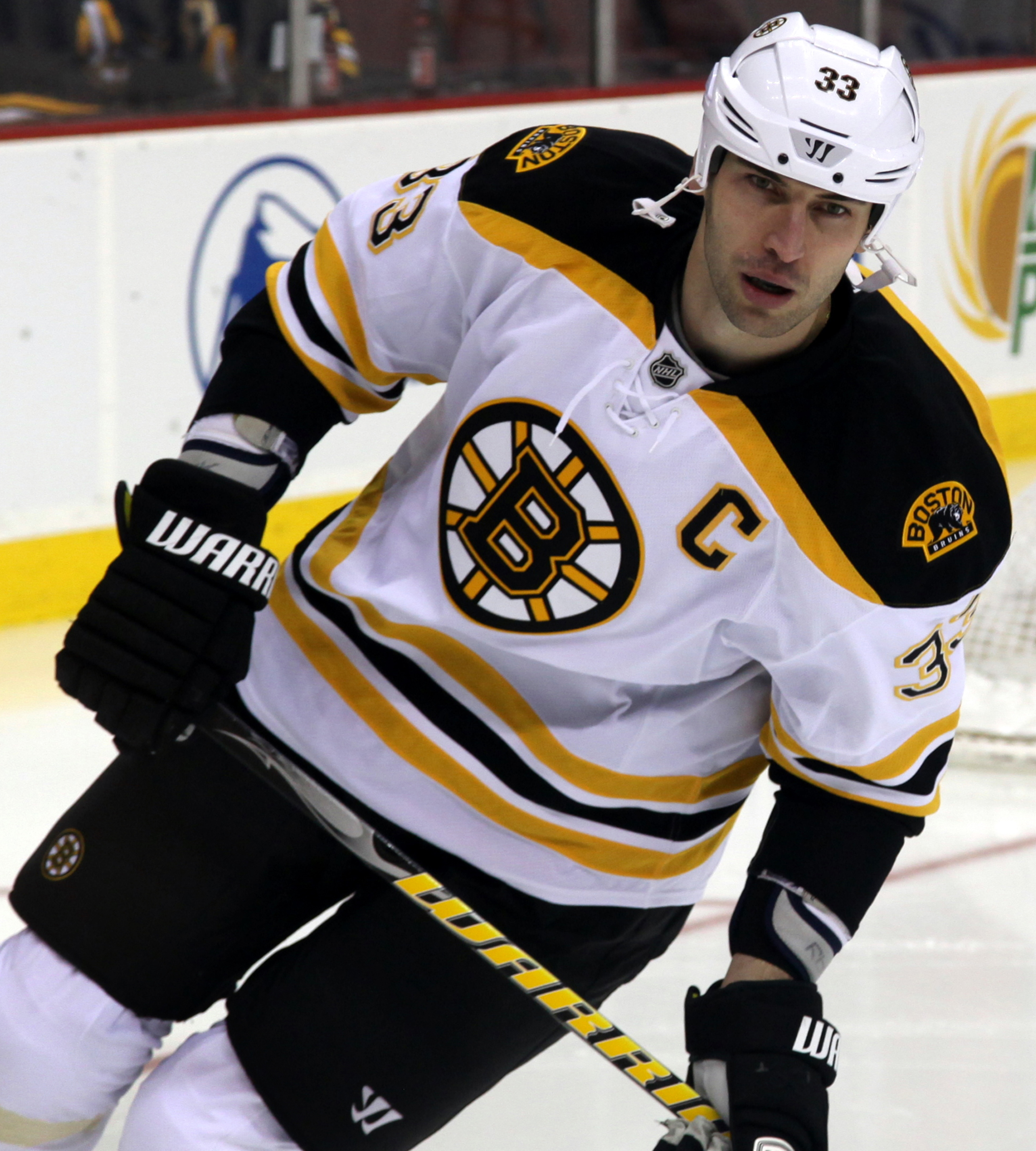
Zdeno Chara captained the Bruins to their second Stanley Cup Final appearance in three years.

#	Nat	Player	Position	Hand	Age	Acquired	Place of birth	Finals appearance
37	(Canada)	Patrice Bergeron – **A**	C	R	27	2003	L'Ancienne-Lorette, Quebec	second (**2011**)
55	(Canada)	Johnny Boychuk	D	R	29	2008	Edmonton, Alberta	second (**2011**)
11	(Canada)	Gregory Campbell	C	L	29	2010	London, Ontario	second (**2011**)
33	(Slovakia)	Zdeno Chara – **C**	D	L	36	2006	Trenčín, Czechoslovakia	second (**2011**)
16	(Latvia)	Kaspars Daugavins	LW	L	25	2013	Riga, Soviet Union	first
21	(Canada)	Andrew Ference	D	L	34	2007	Edmonton, Alberta	third (2004, **2011**)
18	(Canada)	Nathan Horton	RW	R	28	2010	Welland, Ontario	second (**2011**)
68	(Czech Republic)	Jaromir Jagr	RW	L	41	2013	Kladno, Czechoslovakia	third (**1991**, **1992**)
23	(Canada)	Chris Kelly	C	L	32	2011	Toronto, Ontario	third (2007, **2011**)
35	(Russia)	Anton Khudobin	G	L	27	2011	Ust-Kamenogorsk, Soviet Union	first
46	(Czech Republic)	David Krejci – **A**	C	R	27	2004	Šternberk, Czechoslovakia	second (**2011**)
47	(United States)	Torey Krug	D	L	22	2012	Livonia, Michigan	first
17	(Canada)	Milan Lucic	LW	L	25	2006	Vancouver, British Columbia	second (**2011**)
63	(Canada)	Brad Marchand	LW	L	25	2006	Halifax, Nova Scotia	second (**2011**)
54	(Canada)	Adam McQuaid	D	R	26	2007	Charlottetown, Prince Edward Island	second (**2011**)
20	(Canada)	Daniel Paille	LW	L	29	2009	Welland, Ontario	second (**2011**)
49	(Canada)	Rich Peverley	C	R	30	2011	Guelph, Ontario	second (**2011**)
40	(Finland)	Tuukka Rask	G	L	26	2006	Savonlinna, Finland	second (**2011**)
19	(Canada)	Tyler Seguin	C	R	21	2010	Brampton, Ontario	second (**2011**)
44	(Germany)	Dennis Seidenberg	D	L	31	2010	Villingen-Schwenningen, West Germany	second (**2011**)
34	(Sweden)	Carl Soderberg	C	L	27	2013	Malmö, Sweden	first
22	(Canada)	Shawn Thornton	RW	R	35	2007	Oshawa, Ontario	third (**2007**, **2011**)

=== Chicago Blackhawks ===
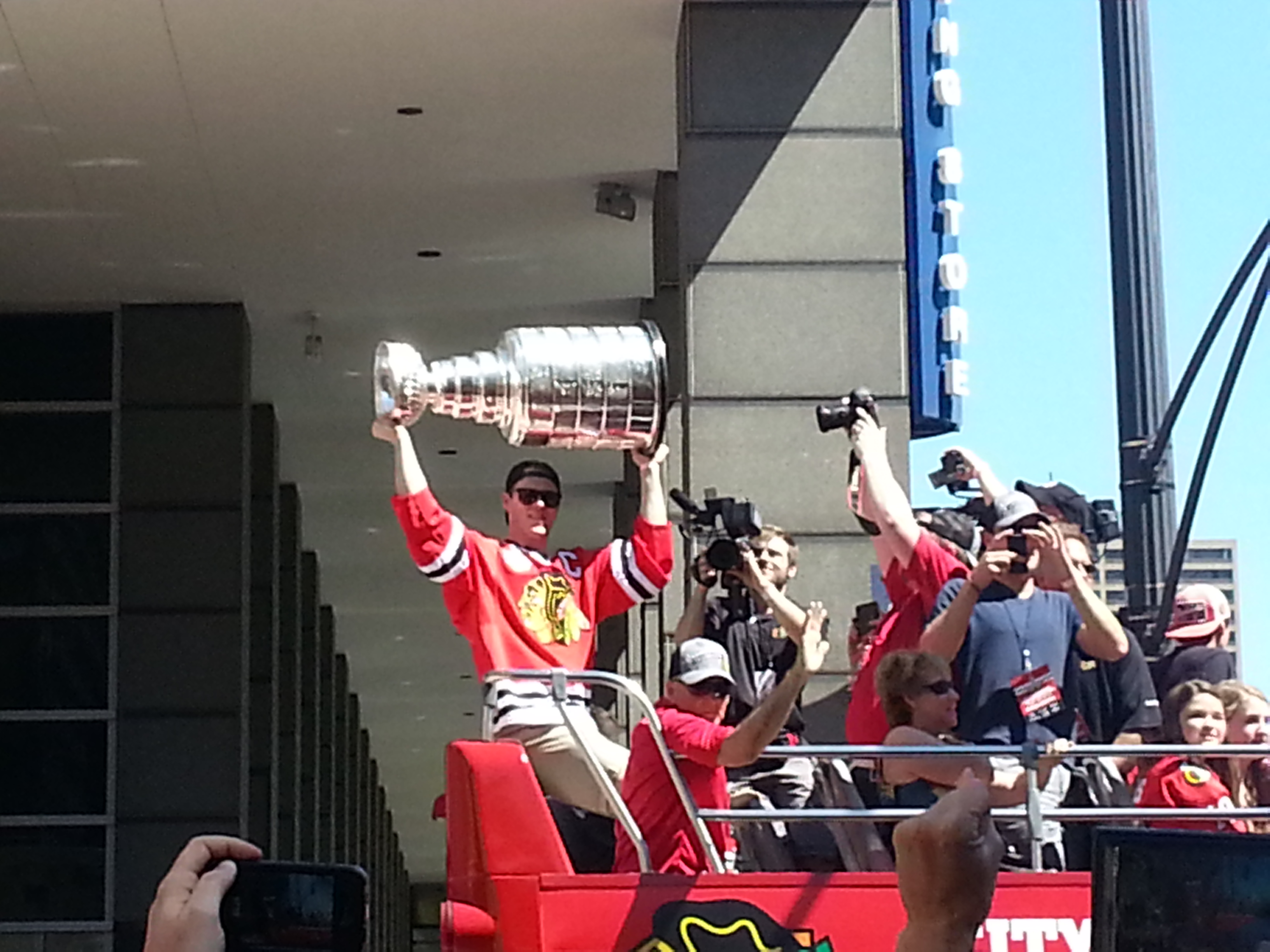
Jonathan Toews captained the Blackhawks to their second Stanley Cup championship in four seasons

#	Nat	Player	Position	Hand	Age	Acquired	Place of birth	Finals appearance
29	(Canada)	Bryan Bickell	LW	L	27	2004	Bowmanville, Ontario	second (**2010**)
36	(Canada)	Dave Bolland	C	R	27	2004	Etobicoke, Ontario	second (**2010**)
52	(United States)	Brandon Bollig	LW	L	26	2010	St. Charles, Missouri	first
17	(Canada)	Sheldon Brookbank	D	R	32	2012	Lanigan, Saskatchewan	first
13	(Canada)	Daniel Carcillo	LW	L	28	2011	King City, Ontario	second (2010)
50	(Canada)	Corey Crawford	G	L	28	2003	Montreal, Quebec	first
30	(Canada)	Ray Emery	G	L	30	2011	Hamilton, Ontario	third (2007, 2010)
67	(Czech Republic)	Michael Frolik	RW	L	25	2011	Kladno, Czechoslovakia	first
26	(Slovakia)	Michal Handzus	C	L	36	2013	Banská Bystrica, Czechoslovakia	first
4	(Sweden)	Niklas Hjalmarsson	D	L	26	2005	Eksjö, Sweden	second (**2010**)
81	(Slovakia)	Marian Hossa	RW	L	34	2009	Stará Ľubovňa, Czechoslovakia	fourth (2008, 2009, **2010**)
88	(United States)	Patrick Kane	RW	L	24	2007	Buffalo, New York	second (**2010**)
2	(Canada)	Duncan Keith – **A**	D	L	29	2002	Winnipeg, Manitoba	second (**2010**)
16	(Sweden)	Marcus Kruger	C	L	23	2009	Stockholm, Sweden	first
8	(United States)	Nick Leddy	D	L	22	2010	Eden Prairie, Minnesota	first
22	(Canada)	Jamal Mayers	RW	R	38	2011	Toronto, Ontario	first (did not play)
27	(Sweden)	Johnny Oduya	D	L	31	2012	Stockholm, Sweden	first
32	(Czech Republic)	Michal Rozsival	D	R	34	2012	Vlašim, Czechoslovakia	first
20	(United States)	Brandon Saad	LW	L	20	2011	Pittsburgh, Pennsylvania	first
7	(Canada)	Brent Seabrook	D	R	28	2003	Richmond, British Columbia	second (**2010**)
10	(Canada)	Patrick Sharp – **A**	RW/C	R	31	2005	Winnipeg, Manitoba	second (**2010**)
65	(Canada)	Andrew Shaw	C	R	21	2011	Belleville, Ontario	first
28	(United States)	Ben Smith	RW	R	24	2008	Winston-Salem, North Carolina	first
25	(Sweden)	Viktor Stalberg	RW	L	27	2010	Gothenburg, Sweden	first
19	(Canada)	Jonathan Toews – **C**	C	L	25	2006	Winnipeg, Manitoba	second (**2010**)

== Stanley Cup engraving ==
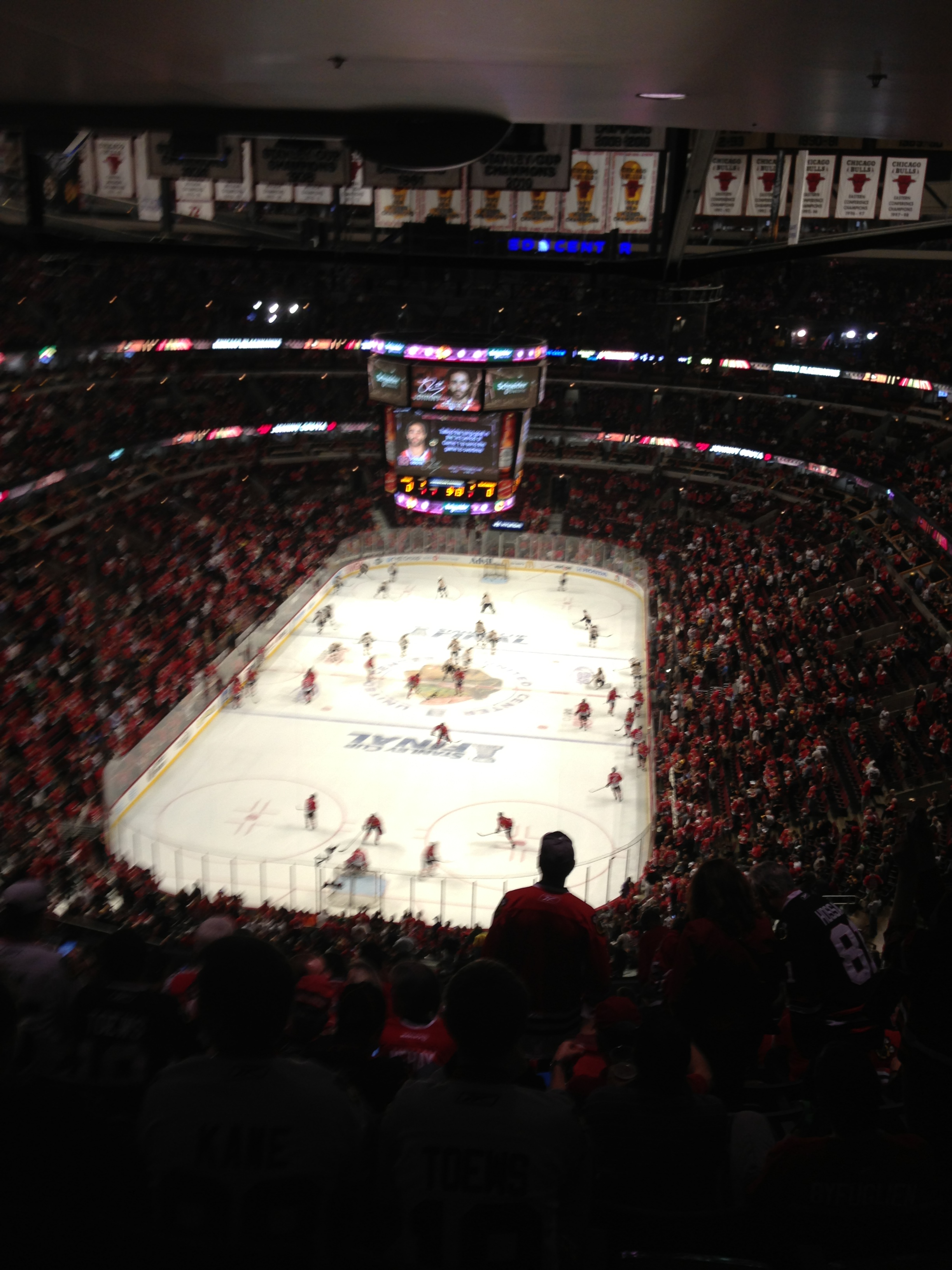
Just before game two of the 2013 Stanley Cup Final at the United Center.

The 2013 Stanley Cup was presented to Blackhawks captain Jonathan Toews by NHL Commissioner Gary Bettman, following the Blackhawks' 3–2 win over the Bruins in the sixth game of the finals.

The following Blackhawks players and staff had their names engraved on the Stanley Cup

2012–13 Chicago Blackhawks

=== Players ===
Centres

- 16 Marcus Kruger*
- 19 Jonathan Toews (Captain)
- 26 Michal Handzus
- 36 Dave Bolland
- 65 Andrew Shaw*

Wingers

- 10 Patrick Sharp* (A)
- 13 Daniel Carcillo †
- 20 Brandon Saad
- 22 Jamal Mayers ‡
- 25 Viktor Stalberg
- 28 Ben Smith
- 29 Bryan Bickell
- 52 Brandon Bollig
- 67 Michael Frolik
- 81 Marian Hossa
- 88 Patrick Kane

Defencemen

- 2 Duncan Keith (A)
- 4 Niklas Hjalmarsson
- 7 Brent Seabrook
- 8 Nick Leddy
- 17 Sheldon Brookbank †
- 27 Johnny Oduya
- 32 Michal Rozsival

Goaltenders

- 30 Ray Emery
- 50 Corey Crawford
- * Played both centre and wing.
- † Did not play in the Final.
- ‡ Exemption granted to engrave the name of a player who did not automatically qualify. (Note: Automatic qualification for a player's name to be engraved on the Stanley Cup: Playing in (for a goaltender, dressing for) at least one Stanley Cup Final game or at least half of regular season games for the Stanley Cup winning team.)

=== Coaching and administrative staff ===
- Rocky Wirtz (Owner/Chairman/Governor), John McDonough (President/Chief Executive Officer/Alt. Governor), Jay Blunk (Executive Vice President)
- Stan Bowman (general manager), Al MacIsaac (Vice President Hockey Operations/Asst. to President), Norm Maciver (assistant general manager), William Scotty Bowman (Senior Adviser, Hockey Operations)
- Joel Quenneville (head coach), Mike Kitchen (assistant coach), Jamie Kompon (assistant coach)
- Stephane Waite (goaltending coach), Mike Gapskie (athletic trainer), Troy Parchman (equipment manager), Jeff Thomas (Asst. Athletic Trainer)
- Clint Reif (Asst. Equipment Manager), Pawel Prylinski (Message Therapist), Jim Heintzelman (Equipment Asst.)
- Paul Goodman (strength & conditioning coach), Tim Campbell (Video Coach), Pierre Gauthier (Director, Player Personnel)
- Mark Kelley (Director, Amateur Scouting), Barry Smith (Director, Player Development), Ryan Stewart (Director, Pro Scouting), Ron Anderson (Director, Player Recruitment)
- Tony Ommen (Senior Director, Team Services), Mark Bernard (General Manager, Minor League Affiliation), Dr. Michael Terry (head team physician)

=== Engraving notes ===
- Two players who did not play in the Finals automatically qualified to have their names engraved along with another who didn’t meet the 23-regular season game requirement but did play one in the Finals. For the shortened 2012–13 season, the NHL's 41-game regular-season games played requirement for automatic inclusion on the Stanley Cup was pro-rated to 23 regular-season games or one game played in the finals (or dressed as the backup goaltender).
  - #13 Daniel Carcillo (LW) – 23 regular season games and four playoff games (two in the first round and two in the second round). Qualified for meeting the 23-regular season game requirement.
  - #17 Sheldon Brookbank (D) – 26 regular season games and one playoff game (in the Western Conference Finals). Qualified for meeting the 23-regular season game requirement.
- #22 Jamal Mayers – played in 19 regular season games and none in the playoffs but was on the main roster all season (as a healthy reserve). His name was engraved due to a successful petition by the Blackhawks.
- #28 Ben Smith – one regular season game and one game in the Stanley Cup Finals (spending the rest of the regular season in the minors with the Rockford IceHogs of the AHL as a black ace for the Blackhawks both before and after the lockout ended). Qualified for playing at least one game in the Stanley Cup Finals.
- Jamie Kompon became the first assistant coach in NHL history to win back to back championships with different teams: 2012 with Los Angeles, and 2013 with Chicago. He would eventually go on to win a third championship in 2024 and a fourth in 2025 as an assistant coach with the Florida Panthers.
- Scotty Bowman moved into second place with his 13th Stanley Cup championship. He became the first person to win multiple Stanley Cups with four teams. Montreal 1973 and 1976–1979, Pittsburgh 1992, Detroit 1997, 1998, 2002 and 2008, Chicago 2010 and 2013. He also lost in the Finals four times: St. Louis in 1968-69-70 (general manager/coach) Detroit 1995 (head coach/director of player personnel).

=== Left off the Stanley Cup ===
- Chicago did not request an exemption to engrave the names of these eleven players on the roster who did not qualify (23 regular season games or 1 Finals game for the pro-rated requirements of the shortened season). None of them played in the playoffs. Only Henrik Karlsson dressed in any playoff games.

Included in team picture

- #55 Ryan Stanton (D) – 1 regular-season game. Stanton played 73 games in minors for Rockford IceHogs and served as a black ace for the Blackhawks.

Not in team picture

- #39 Jimmy Hayes (RW) – 10 regular season games. He was recalled as a black ace for the playoffs.
- #11 Jeremy Morin (LW) – 3 regular season games. He was recalled as a black ace for the playoffs.
- #33 Carter Hutton (G) – 1 regular season game. He was recalled for the playoffs as a black ace.
- #37 Brandon Pirri (C) – 1 regular season game. He was recalled as a black ace for the playoffs.
- #42 Shawn Lalonde (D) – 1 regular season game. He was recalled as a black ace for the playoffs.
- #38 Henrik Karlsson (G) – dressed for the 5 games in the first round of the playoffs, due to Ray Emery being injured.
- #5 Steve Montador (D) – 0 regular season games. He was recalled for the playoffs as a black ace.
- #34 Dylan Olsen (D) – 0 regular season games. He was recalled for the playoffs as a black ace.
- #44 Klas Dahlbeck (D) – 0 regular season games. He was recalled for the playoffs as a black ace.
- #49 Adam Clendening (D) – 0 regular season games. He was recalled for the playoffs as a black ace.

== Notes ==
Preceded by Los Angeles Kings; 2012	Chicago Blackhawks; Stanley Cup champions 2013	Succeeded by Los Angeles Kings; 2014
