= Stéphane Waite =

Canadian ice hockey coach

- Born: December 4, 1965 (age 60); Sherbrooke, Quebec, Canada
- Occupation: Goaltender coach for the Montreal Canadiens

Stéphane Waite (born December 4, 1965) was the goaltending coach for the Montreal Canadiens of the National Hockey League from 2013 until March 2, 2021. He was previously the goaltending coach for the Chicago Blackhawks, where he won the Stanley Cup in 2010 and 2013. He spent ten years as a goalie coach in Chicago. He has owned a goalie school operating in Sherbrooke, Terrebonne and Brossard since 1988.

== Personal life ==
Waite married his wife on June 30, 2001. They have one son.
