= Sheldon Brookbank =

Canadian ice hockey player (born 1980)

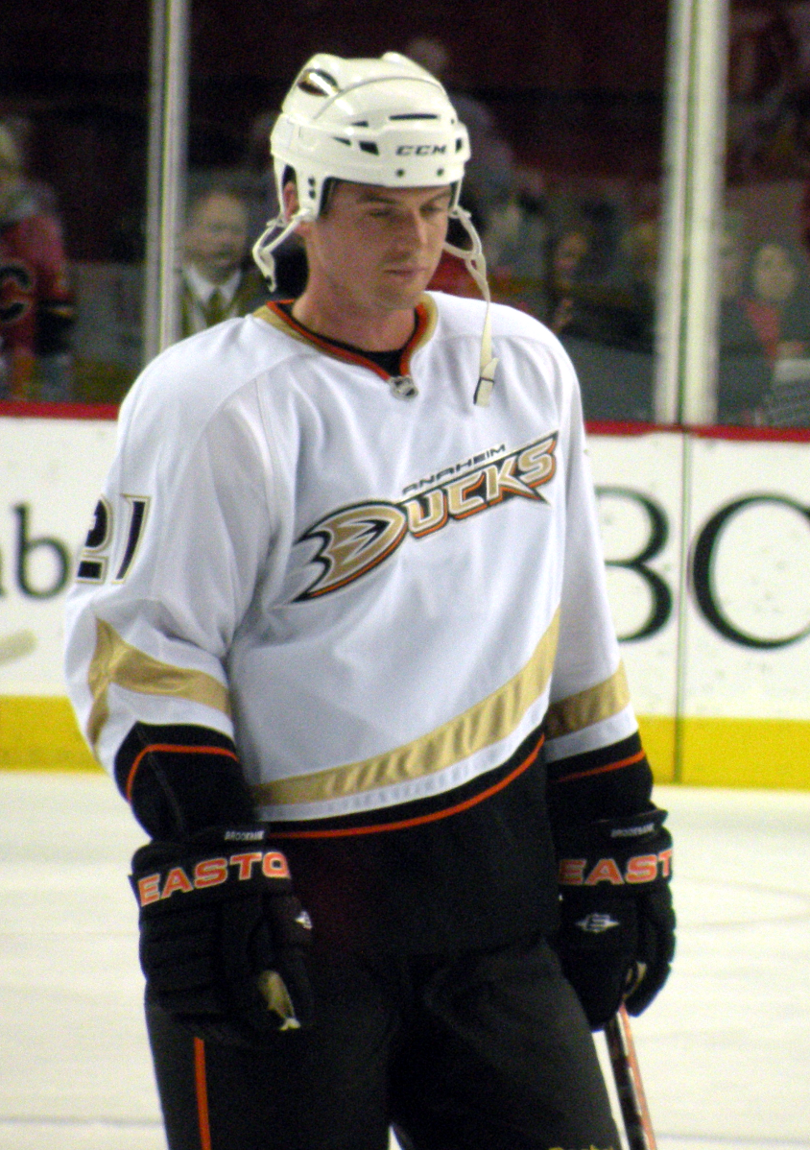
- Born: October 3, 1980 (age 45) Lanigan, Saskatchewan, Canada
- Height: 6 ft 1 in (185 cm)
- Weight: 202 lb (92 kg; 14 st 6 lb)
- Position: Defence
- Shot: Right
- Played for: Nashville Predators; New Jersey Devils; Anaheim Ducks; Chicago Blackhawks; Ak Bars Kazan; Lukko
- NHL draft: Undrafted
- Playing career: 2001–2016

Sheldon W. Brookbank (born October 3, 1980) is a Canadian former professional ice hockey defenceman who played in the National Hockey League (NHL). He was the assistant coach of the Chicago Blackhawks of the National Hockey League (NHL) under Jeremy Colliton.

== Playing career ==
Brookbank played three seasons with the Humboldt Broncos of the Saskatchewan Junior Hockey League, before turning pro. He played one season with the Mississippi Sea Wolves of the ECHL, and then played two seasons with the Grand Rapids Griffins of the AHL.

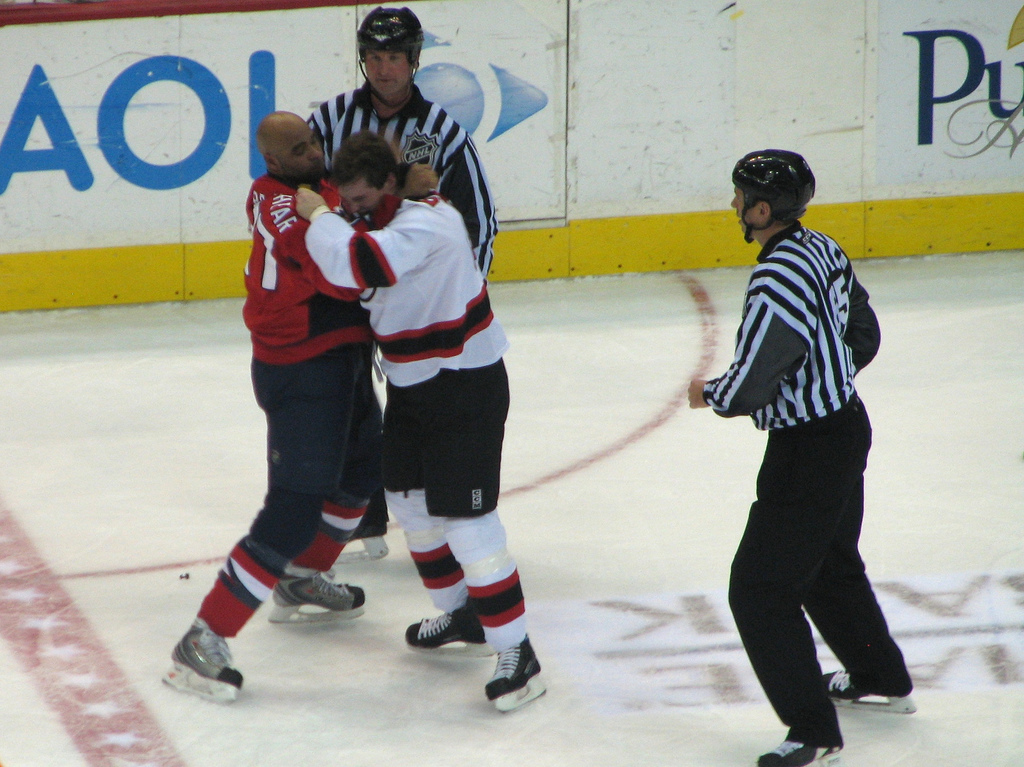
Brookbank (right) fights Donald Brashear

Brookbank was then signed by the Mighty Ducks of Anaheim, and played two seasons with their AHL affiliate, the Cincinnati Mighty Ducks. He was not re-signed, and in August 2005, he signed a contract with the Predators.

In the 2005–06 season with the Predators' affiliate, the Milwaukee Admirals, Brookbank had 9 goals, 35 points, and 232 penalty minutes.

The 2006–07 season saw Brookbank named as captain of the Admirals as well as his first call-up to the NHL. He appeared in 3 games with the Predators, and had 1 assist and 12 penalty minutes. He won the Eddie Shore Award as the American Hockey League's Outstanding Defenceman and was an AHL First Team All-Star. While in the AHL that season, he led all defencemen in points at 53 points.

On July 2, 2007, Brookbank was signed by the Blue Jackets. He joined the Devils on October 2, 2007, after being waived by the Blue Jackets. He played in 44 games with the Devils in the 2007–08 season, and had 8 assists.

On February 3, 2009, Brookbank was traded to the Anaheim Ducks in exchange for the rights to David McIntyre. He finished the season with one goal and three assists.

The 2009–10 season saw Brookbank play 66 NHL games which included the Ducks' final 56 consecutive games. At season's end, he led all Ducks defensemen in plus/minus (+10) to place 2nd overall on the team. On June 2, 2010, Brookbank re-signed to a two-year contract to remain with the Ducks.

Brookbank played a career-high 80 games during the 2011–12 season, and scored a career-best 3 goals and 11 assists. On July 1, 2012, Brookbank signed a two-year, $2.5 million free agent deal with the Chicago Blackhawks and went on to win the Stanley Cup with the team during the 2013 season.

Brookbank was not re-signed by the Blackhawks at the completion of his contract and became a free agent. Without a contract offer, Brookbank agreed to a training camp try-out with the Calgary Flames, but was released by the team on October 1, 2014. Brookbank turned to Russia, and signed a one-year contract with Ak Bars Kazan of the Kontinental Hockey League on October 31, 2014.

The following season, Brookbank remained abroad, moving to the Finnish Liiga, belatedly signing for Lukko Rauma on November 6, 2015. In 38 games with Lukko, Brookbank added 4 points.

A free agent the following summer, Brookbank returned to North America, signing a professional try-out with defending Calder Cup champions Cleveland Monsters on October 13, 2016. In the 2016–17 season, adding depth cover to the Monsters' blueline, Brookbank registered one assist in six games before he was released at the conclusion of his trial period on December 12, 2016.

== Coaching career ==
On June 14, 2017, it was announced that Brookbank had been hired as the assistant coach of the Rockford Ice Hogs, the minor league affiliate of the Chicago Blackhawks. On January 4, 2019, he was added as an assistant coach to the Blackhawks' coaching staff. Brookbank was fired by the Blackhawks on November 6, 2021, along with head coach Jeremy Colliton and fellow assistant coach Tomas Mitell. He is currently an assistant coach for the Wilkes-Barre/Scranton Penguins.

== Personal ==
He is the younger brother of Wade Brookbank who last played for the Rockford IceHogs, and is also the cousin of former NHL player Geoff Sanderson.

== Career statistics ==
| | | | Regular season | | | | | Playoffs |
| Season | Team | League | GP | G | A | Pts | PIM | GP | G | A | Pts | PIM |
|---|---|---|---|---|---|---|---|---|---|---|---|---|
| 1997–98 | Saskatoon Contacts AAA | SMHL | 42 | 4 | 19 | 23 | 45 | — | — | — | — | — |
| 1998–99 | Humboldt Broncos | SJHL | 61 | 3 | 18 | 21 | 205 | 14 | 1 | 8 | 9 | 31 |
| 1999–2000 | Humboldt Broncos | SJHL | 59 | 13 | 29 | 42 | 240 | 15 | 4 | 7 | 11 | 49 |
| 2000–01 | Humboldt Broncos | SJHL | 59 | 14 | 35 | 49 | 281 | 5 | 2 | 6 | 8 | 10 |
| 2001–02 | Mississippi Sea Wolves | ECHL | 62 | 8 | 21 | 29 | 137 | 10 | 1 | 4 | 5 | 27 |
| 2001–02 | Grand Rapids Griffins | AHL | 6 | 0 | 1 | 1 | 24 | — | — | — | — | — |
| 2002–03 | Grand Rapids Griffins | AHL | 69 | 2 | 11 | 13 | 136 | 15 | 1 | 3 | 4 | 28 |
| 2003–04 | Cincinnati Mighty Ducks | AHL | 74 | 2 | 9 | 11 | 216 | 9 | 0 | 2 | 2 | 20 |
| 2004–05 | Cincinnati Mighty Ducks | AHL | 60 | 1 | 11 | 12 | 181 | 11 | 0 | 0 | 0 | 40 |
| 2005–06 | Milwaukee Admirals | AHL | 73 | 9 | 26 | 35 | 232 | 21 | 1 | 8 | 9 | 49 |
| 2006–07 | Milwaukee Admirals | AHL | 78 | 15 | 38 | 53 | 176 | 4 | 0 | 0 | 0 | 6 |
| 2006–07 | Nashville Predators | NHL | 3 | 0 | 1 | 1 | 12 | — | — | — | — | — |
| 2007–08 | New Jersey Devils | NHL | 44 | 0 | 8 | 8 | 63 | — | — | — | — | — |
| 2007–08 | Lowell Devils | AHL | 1 | 0 | 0 | 0 | 5 | — | — | — | — | — |
| 2008–09 | New Jersey Devils | NHL | 15 | 0 | 0 | 0 | 25 | — | — | — | — | — |
| 2008–09 | Anaheim Ducks | NHL | 29 | 1 | 3 | 4 | 51 | 13 | 0 | 0 | 0 | 18 |
| 2009–10 | Anaheim Ducks | NHL | 66 | 0 | 9 | 9 | 114 | — | — | — | — | — |
| 2010–11 | Anaheim Ducks | NHL | 40 | 0 | 0 | 0 | 63 | 4 | 0 | 0 | 0 | 14 |
| 2011–12 | Anaheim Ducks | NHL | 80 | 3 | 11 | 14 | 72 | — | — | — | — | — |
| 2012–13 | Chicago Blackhawks | NHL | 26 | 1 | 0 | 1 | 21 | 1 | 0 | 0 | 0 | 0 |
| 2013–14 | Chicago Blackhawks | NHL | 48 | 2 | 5 | 7 | 52 | 7 | 0 | 2 | 2 | 0 |
| 2014–15 | Ak Bars Kazan | KHL | 35 | 3 | 4 | 7 | 37 | 9 | 1 | 0 | 1 | 4 |
| 2015–16 | Lukko | Liiga | 38 | 1 | 3 | 4 | 65 | 4 | 0 | 0 | 0 | 4 |
| 2016–17 | Cleveland Monsters | AHL | 6 | 0 | 1 | 1 | 2 | — | — | — | — | — |
| AHL totals | | | 367 | 29 | 97 | 126 | 972 | 60 | 2 | 13 | 15 | 143 |
| NHL totals | | | 351 | 7 | 37 | 44 | 473 | 25 | 0 | 2 | 2 | 32 |

== Awards and honours ==
| Award | Year |
|---|---|
SJHL
| Best Defenseman | 2001 |
AHL
| All-Star Game | 2007 |
| First All-Star Team | 2007 |
| Eddie Shore Award | 2007 |
NHL
| Stanley Cup champion | 2013 |
