= Brandon Bollig =

American ice hockey player (born 1987)

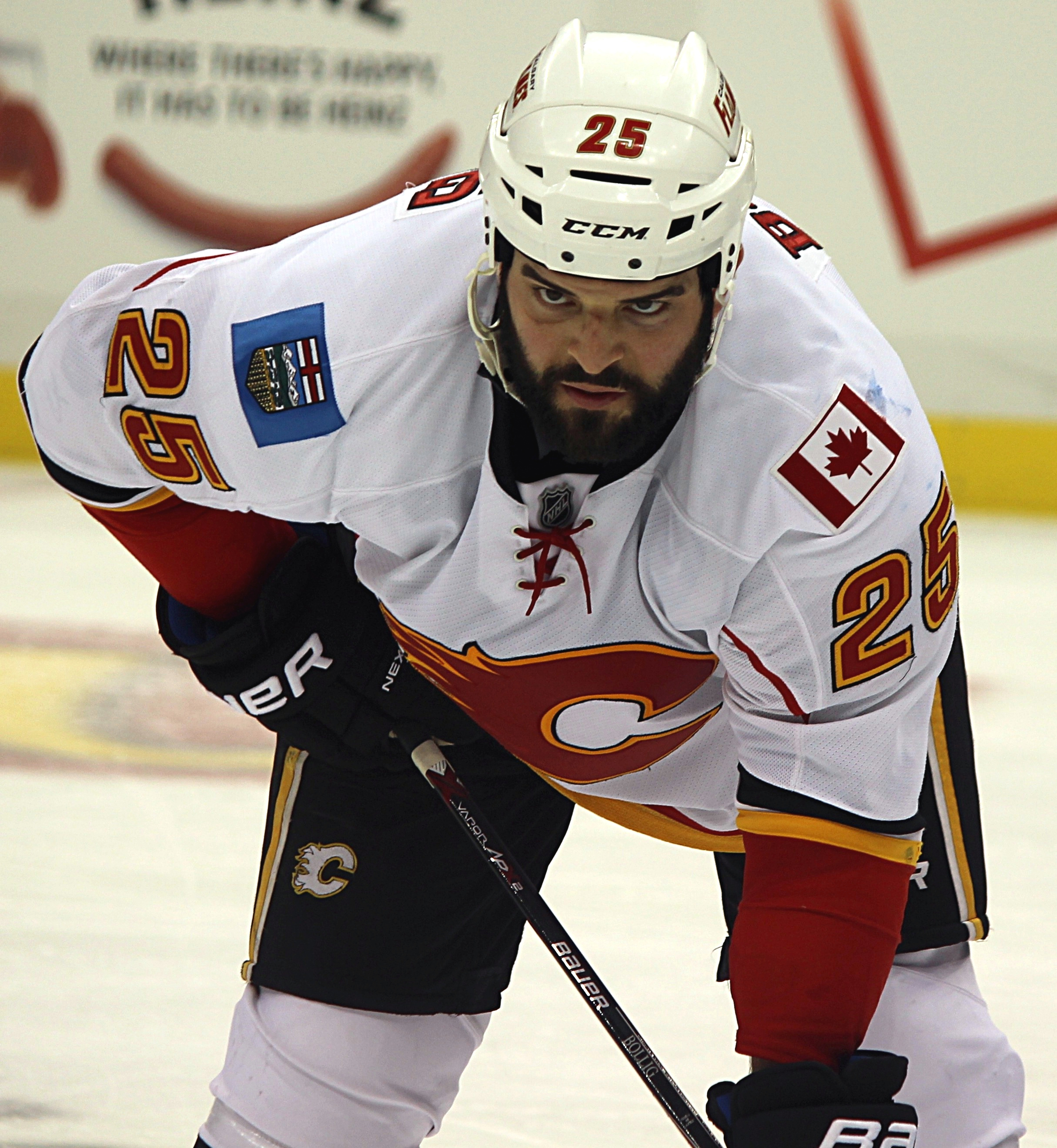
- Bollig with the Calgary Flames in December 2014
- Born: January 31, 1987 (age 39) St. Charles, Missouri, U.S.
- Height: 6 ft 2 in (188 cm)
- Weight: 223 lb (101 kg; 15 st 13 lb)
- Position: Left wing
- Shot: Left
- Played for: Chicago Blackhawks; Calgary Flames
- NHL draft: Undrafted
- Playing career: 2010–2018

Brandon D. Bollig (born January 31, 1987) is an American former professional ice hockey player. An undrafted player, Bollig signed with the Chicago Blackhawks organization in 2010 after playing college hockey for St. Lawrence University. He made his NHL debut in 2012 and was a member of Chicago's Stanley Cup championship team in 2013. The Calgary Flames acquired Bollig in a draft-day trade on June 28, 2014.

== Playing career ==
As a youth, Bollig played in the 2001 Quebec International Pee-Wee Hockey Tournament with the St. Louis Blues minor ice hockey team.

Bollig played high school hockey for Francis Howell North High School in St. Charles, Missouri, where he graduated in 2005 with a 3.4 grade point average. During his junior year of high school, he also tried out for the St. Louis Jr. Blues Tier III Junior B team, but was cut. Bollig tried out again the following year and made the team for the 2004–05 season. After spending one season with the Jr. Blues and graduating from high school, Bollig moved up to the United States Hockey League (USHL) to join the Lincoln Stars.

Bollig played three seasons of tier I junior ice hockey with the Lincoln Stars of the USHL between 2005 and 2008. He appeared in 173 games for the Stars and recorded 37 goals and 36 assists in that time, as well as 593 penalty minutes (PIM). He finished second in the USHL in penalties in both 2006–07 and 2007–08 with 207 and 211 PIM respectively. He then attended St. Lawrence University where he played two seasons of NCAA Division I college hockey with the Saints. After recording 13 points as a freshman in 2008–09, Bollig finished fourth in team scoring with 25 points and led the team with 83 PIM.

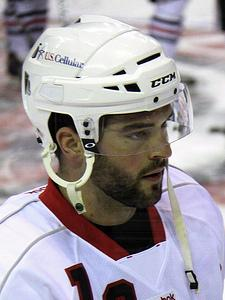
Bollig with the Rockford IceHogs in October 2011.

The Chicago Blackhawks lured Bollig out of university following his sophomore season and signed him to a professional contract in April 2010. The Blackhawks assigned him to their American Hockey League (AHL) affiliate, the Rockford IceHogs to complete the 2009–10 season; Bollig made his professional debut on April 6, 2010, and scored his first professional goal four nights later against the San Antonio Rampage. He played the entire 2010–11 season with the IceHogs, and remained in Rockford for the majority of the following campaign.

Chicago recalled Bollig late in the 2011–12 season to serve as a replacement for enforcer John Scott, who was traded to the New York Rangers. Bollig made his NHL debut on February 29, 2012, against the Toronto Maple Leafs; he also recorded his first fight, against Leafs' defenseman Luke Schenn. He appeared in the final 18 regular season games with the Blackhawks and was held pointless but recorded 58 PIM. In the 2012 playoffs, Bollig appeared in four of the six games in the team's first round match-up against the Phoenix Coyotes and scored his first NHL goal on April 14, a game-tying marker against goaltender Mike Smith in the second game of the series. The Blackhawks would eventually lose the first round series in six games to the Coyotes.

Bollig returned to Rockford to begin the 2012–13 season due to the NHL lockout. He appeared in 35 games and recorded nine points (five goals, four assists) for the IceHogs before returning to Chicago once the lockout ended in January 2013, and his 157 PIM was second in the AHL at that time. In the shortened 2012–13 season with the Blackhawks, his first full NHL season, he played 25 games with Chicago, again held pointless, and led the team with 51 PIM. After helping the Blackhawks win the Presidents' Trophy (as the team with the best regular season record), Bollig appeared in five playoff games out of the 23 total in the 2013 playoffs (three games in round one, none in rounds two or three and two games in the Final), while playing on the fourth line with Michael Frolík and Marcus Krüger as the team went on to defeat the Boston Bruins in the Final in six games to claim the Stanley Cup. He was the first native of the St. Louis region to win the Cup as a player.

The first regular season goal of Bollig's career came in Chicago's opening game of the 2013–14 season, October 1, 2013, against Braden Holtby of the Washington Capitals. Bollig appeared in all 82 games for Chicago, scored seven goals and added seven assists for 14 points and led the team in penalty minutes again with 92 PIMS. The season was a transitional one for Bollig as he expanded on his a role as a pure enforcer and placed added focus on becoming a defensive forward on Chicago's fourth line with Ben Smith and Marcus Krüger. Chicago signed Bollig to a three-year contract extension worth $1.25 million per year On March 1, 2014, taking him until the 2016–17 season. In the second round of the 2014 playoffs against the Minnesota Wild, Bollig received a two-game suspension for boarding Wild' defenseman Keith Ballard in game four. After the Blackhawks defeated the Wild in games five and six to take the series in six games, Bollig returned to the lineup for the defending Stanley Cup champion Blackhawks in time for the Western Conference Finals against the Los Angeles Kings for the second straight season, where the Blackhawks would be defeated by the eventual Stanley Cup champion Kings in seven games. Bollig finished the playoffs with an assist and point in 15 games.

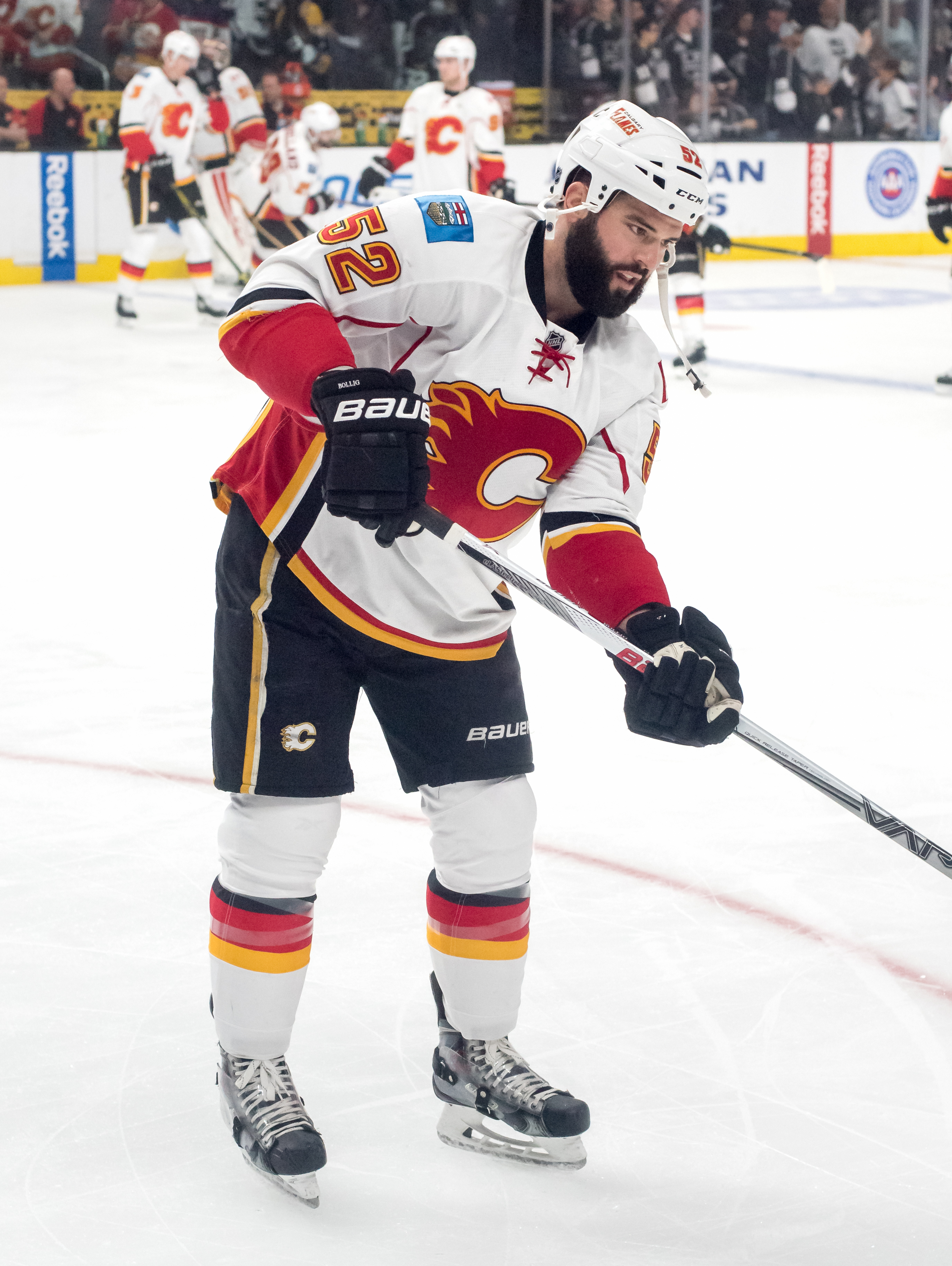
Bollig with the Calgary Flames in March 2016

On June 28, 2014, Chicago traded Bollig to the Calgary Flames in exchange for a third round selection at the 2014 NHL entry draft to remain salary cap compliant. Bollig played in 62 games for the Flames the 2014–15 season with one goal, four assists and five points and led the Flames in penalty minutes with 88 PIMS as the Flames qualified for the playoffs for the first time since 2009. In the 2015 playoffs, Bollig appeared in all 11 games with two goals, no assists and two points as the Flames defeated the Vancouver Canucks in six games in the opening round before falling in five games in the second round to the top-seeded Anaheim Ducks.

In the 2015–16 season, Bollig played 54 games for the Flames with two goals, two assists and four points and led the Flames in penalty minutes with 103 PIMS as the Flames failed to qualify for the 2016 playoffs, marking the first time in his career where Bollig missed the playoffs.

On July 4, 2017, Bollig signed as a free agent to a one-year, two-way contract worth $650,000 with the San Jose Sharks. He was assigned to play with AHL affiliate, the San Jose Barracuda to begin the 2017–18 season. After appearing in 45 games with the Barracuda, on February 25, 2018, Bollig was traded by the Sharks alongside Troy Grosenick to the Nashville Predators in exchange for a sixth round draft pick in 2018.

As a free agent over the 2018 off-season and going unsigned into the mid-point of the 2018–19 season, Bollig announced his retirement from his 8-year professional career on January 16, 2019.

== Personal ==
Bollig married Dannah Lakin on August 4, 2018, in Chicago.

Bollig was cast as Will Cross, age 12, in the 2002 film Defiance, which also including former St. Louis Blues enforcer Tony Twist in the cast.

== Career statistics ==
| | | | Regular season | | | | | Playoffs |
| Season | Team | League | GP | G | A | Pts | PIM | GP | G | A | Pts | PIM |
|---|---|---|---|---|---|---|---|---|---|---|---|---|
| 2005–06 | Lincoln Stars | USHL | 58 | 8 | 8 | 16 | 175 | 9 | 1 | 2 | 3 | 12 |
| 2006–07 | Lincoln Stars | USHL | 57 | 14 | 12 | 26 | 207 | 9 | 1 | 2 | 3 | 12 |
| 2007–08 | Lincoln Stars | USHL | 58 | 15 | 16 | 31 | 211 | 8 | 2 | 4 | 6 | 40 |
| 2008–09 | St. Lawrence University | ECAC | 36 | 6 | 7 | 13 | 51 | — | — | — | — | — |
| 2009–10 | St. Lawrence University | ECAC | 42 | 7 | 18 | 25 | 83 | — | — | — | — | — |
| 2009–10 | Rockford IceHogs | AHL | 3 | 1 | 1 | 2 | 7 | — | — | — | — | — |
| 2010–11 | Rockford IceHogs | AHL | 55 | 4 | 0 | 4 | 115 | — | — | — | — | — |
| 2011–12 | Rockford IceHogs | AHL | 53 | 3 | 6 | 9 | 163 | — | — | — | — | — |
| 2011–12 | Chicago Blackhawks | NHL | 18 | 0 | 0 | 0 | 58 | 4 | 1 | 0 | 1 | 19 |
| 2012–13 | Rockford IceHogs | AHL | 35 | 5 | 4 | 9 | 157 | — | — | — | — | — |
| 2012–13 | Chicago Blackhawks | NHL | 25 | 0 | 0 | 0 | 51 | 5 | 0 | 0 | 0 | 2 |
| 2013–14 | Chicago Blackhawks | NHL | 82 | 7 | 7 | 14 | 92 | 15 | 0 | 1 | 1 | 16 |
| 2014–15 | Calgary Flames | NHL | 62 | 1 | 4 | 5 | 88 | 11 | 2 | 0 | 2 | 38 |
| 2015–16 | Calgary Flames | NHL | 54 | 2 | 2 | 4 | 103 | — | — | — | — | — |
| 2016–17 | Stockton Heat | AHL | 60 | 11 | 11 | 22 | 136 | 5 | 1 | 0 | 1 | 2 |
| 2017–18 | San Jose Barracuda | AHL | 45 | 8 | 2 | 10 | 68 | — | — | — | — | — |
| 2017–18 | Milwaukee Admirals | AHL | 21 | 3 | 1 | 4 | 30 | — | — | — | — | — |
| NHL totals | | | 241 | 10 | 13 | 23 | 392 | 35 | 3 | 1 | 4 | 75 |
