= Dave Bolland =

Canadian ice hockey player (born 1986)

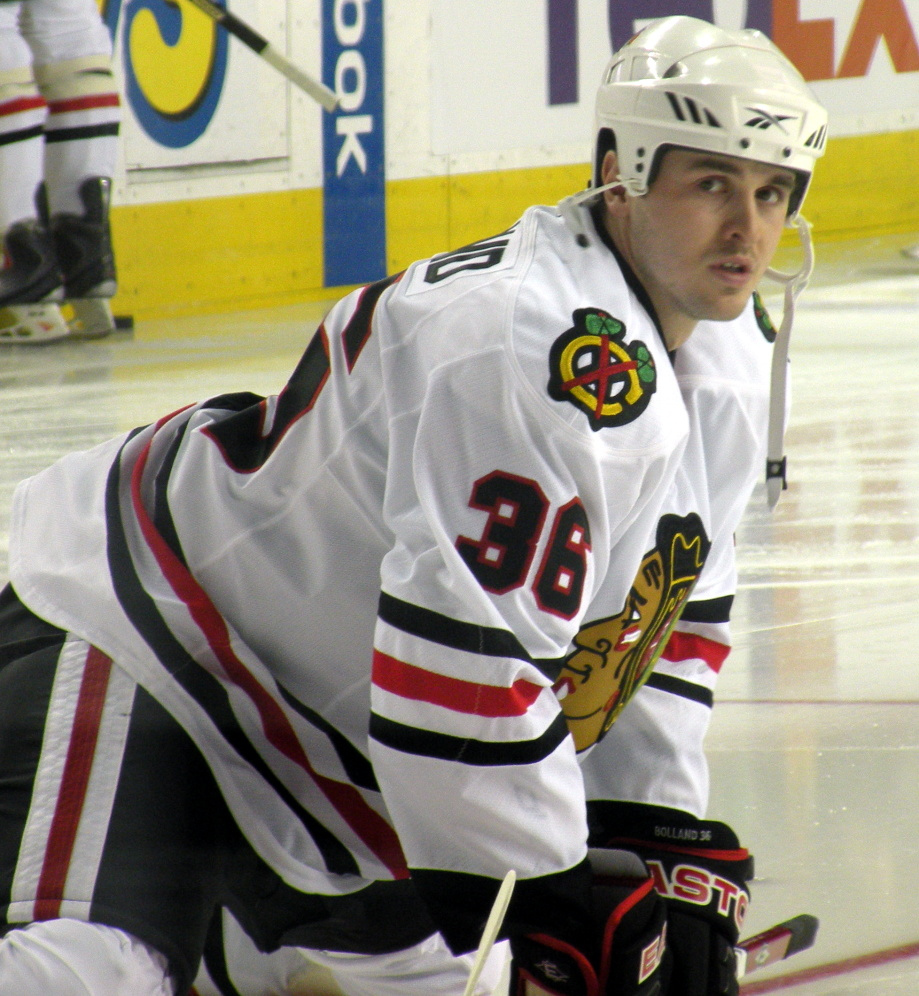
- Bolland with the Chicago Blackhawks in April 2009
- Born: June 5, 1986 (age 40) Etobicoke, Ontario, Canada
- Height: 6 ft 0 in (183 cm)
- Weight: 181 lb (82 kg; 12 st 13 lb)
- Position: Centre
- Shot: Right
- Played for: Chicago Blackhawks; Toronto Maple Leafs; Florida Panthers
- NHL draft: 32nd overall, 2004; Chicago Blackhawks
- Playing career: 2006–2016

David D. Bolland (born June 5, 1986) is a Canadian former professional ice hockey player.

Bolland was drafted by the Chicago Blackhawks in the second round (32nd overall) of the 2004 NHL entry draft. While playing junior hockey in the Ontario Hockey League (OHL), Bolland helped the London Knights capture the 2005 Memorial Cup. He also competed at the 2006 World Junior Championships, where he helped Canada capture the gold medal. Bolland also skated in the American Hockey League (AHL) for the Norfolk Admirals and Rockford IceHogs.

He spent most of his playing career with the Blackhawks and won the Stanley Cup with them in both 2010 and 2013, and scored the Stanley Cup-winning goal in 2013 with less than a minute remaining in regulation. Bolland also played brief stints with Toronto Maple Leafs and Florida Panthers.

== Playing career ==
Bolland was born June 5, 1986, in Etobicoke, now a part of Toronto, Ontario, and lived in the Mimico neighbourhood. He started playing hockey at the local arena, Mimico Arena, where he played for the Queensway Canadiens. He then played minor hockey for the Toronto Red Wings in the Greater Toronto Hockey League (GTHL) from 2000 until 2002. The Red Wings would go on to win the OHL All Ontario Bantam Championship, with Bolland recording four points in the championship game. He played in the 2000 Quebec International Pee-Wee Hockey Tournament with the Toronto Red Wings. Bolland was a member of the Bantam All-Ontario champions Toronto Red Wings with future Chicago Blackhawk teammate Bryan Bickell.

=== Junior ===
While playing for the Toronto Red Wings, Bolland was selected in the first round, eighth overall, of the 2002 Ontario Hockey League Priority Selection by the London Knights. He made his OHL debut with the Knights during the 2002–03 season, where he recorded 17 points in 63 games. During his sophomore OHL season, Bolland increased his offensive contributions to the Knights with 37 goals and 30 assists for 67 points. He was also named the club's Most Improved Player. Bolland represented the Western Conference at the 2004 OHL All-Star Game and was also chosen to participate in the 2004 CHL Top Prospects Game. Heading into the 2004 NHL entry draft, Bolland was the eighth ranked North American skater by the NHL's Central Scouting Bureau. Bolland was selected by the Chicago Blackhawks in the second round, 32nd overall, of the 2004 NHL Entry Draft.

=== Professional (2006–2016) ===
==== Chicago Blackhawks (2006–2013) ====
Bolland made his NHL debut against the Vancouver Canucks on October 25, 2006, where the Blackhawks would lose 5–0. This would be his only game for the Blackhawks during the 2006–07 season, spending the rest of the season with the Norfolk Admirals of the American Hockey League, recording 17 goals and 32 assists for 49 points in 65 games along with being held goalless and four assists and points in six playoff games.

Bolland started the 2007–08 season with the Rockford IceHogs of the American Hockey League, though spent the majority of his second professional season with the Blackhawks. He recorded his first NHL point on October 31, 2007, with an assist on a goal by James Wisniewski in a 5–4 win against the Dallas Stars and scored his first NHL goal on December 16 against the Florida Panthers. On December 23, Bolland suffered a broken finger as a result form blocking a shot in a 3–2 win over the Edmonton Oilers, causing him to miss the next 15 games. He ended the season with four goals and 13 assists for 17 points in 39 games for the Blackhawks.

Bolland scored a game-winning overtime goal against the Toronto Maple Leafs on November 22, 2008. The 2008–09 season turned out to be a breakout year for Bolland as he finished with 19 goals and 28 assists for 47 points in 81 games to help the Blackhawks finish as the fourth seed in the West and qualify for the playoffs for the first time since 2002. Bolland made his Stanley Cup playoff debut in the first game in the first round of the 2009 playoffs on April 16, 2009, against the Calgary Flames, recording an assist on a Martin Havlát goal in the 3–2 win. The Blackhawks would eventually defeat the fifth-seeded Flames in six games for the teams first playoff series win since 1996. On April 30, in the first game of the second round against the Vancouver Canucks where the Blackhawks lost 5–3, Bolland recorded his first career playoff goal on Canucks' goaltender Roberto Luongo. Bolland and the Blackhawks would go on to defeat the third-seeded Canucks in six games to advance to the Western Conference Finals. On May 22, 2009, Bolland had two assists for the Blackhawks in the first 10 minutes of the third game of the third round series against the defending Stanley Cup champion Detroit Red Wings. The Blackhawks would eventually get defeated by the second-seeded and defending Stanley Cup champion Red Wings in five games. Bolland finished his first playoff with four goals and eight assists for 12 points in all 17 games.

On June 29, 2009, Bolland signed a five-year extension worth $3.3 million annually. On November 10, Bolland underwent surgery to repair a herniated disk in his back, taking him out of the Blackhawks line-up for the next 41 games. He would finish with six goals and 10 assists for 16 points in 39 contests for the 2009–10 season as the Blackhawks as a team finished second in the West. On June 9, 2010, Bolland became a Stanley Cup champion when the Blackhawks defeated the Philadelphia Flyers in game six of the 2010 Stanley Cup Final and won the Stanley Cup, ending their 49-year drought. Bolland finished the 2010 playoffs with eight goals and assists for 16 points in all 22 games.

On October 29, 2010, Bolland suffered a rib injury in a 7–4 loss to the Edmonton Oilers, resulting in him missing the next four games. On March 9, 2011, in a 4–3 shootout loss against the Tampa Bay Lightning, Bolland was on the receiving end of an elbow to the back of the head from Lightning' forward Pavel Kubina, resulting in a season-ending concussion for Bolland and a three-game suspension for Kubina. After missing the last 14 games of the 2010–11 season and the first three games of the opening round of the 2011 playoffs due to this injury, Bolland would return for game four of the series on April 19 against the Presidents' Trophy-winning Vancouver Canucks, where he would record a goal and three assists on goals Duncan Keith, Bryan Bickell and Michael Frolík, respectively, for his first career four-point game as the Blackhawks would defeat the Canucks 7–2 to prevent the Blackhawks from getting swept out of the playoffs. Two days later, the Blackhawks would also overwhelm the Canucks in game five by recording a 5–0 shutout win to extend the series to a sixth game. In the sixth game of the series three days later, Bolland would record a two-point night with a goal and an assist on a Bryan Bickell goal as the Blackhawks would defeat the Canucks in overtime 4–3 to force a seventh game. The defending Stanley Cup champion and eighth-seeded Blackhawks would become the seventh team in league history to force a game seven after initially having a 3–0 series deficit. In the deciding seventh game two days later, the Blackhawks quest to defend their title would end as they would be defeated by the Canucks in overtime with Canucks' forward Alexandre Burrows scoring the game and series winner. Bolland ended the playoffs and the series with two goals and four assists for six points in the final four games.

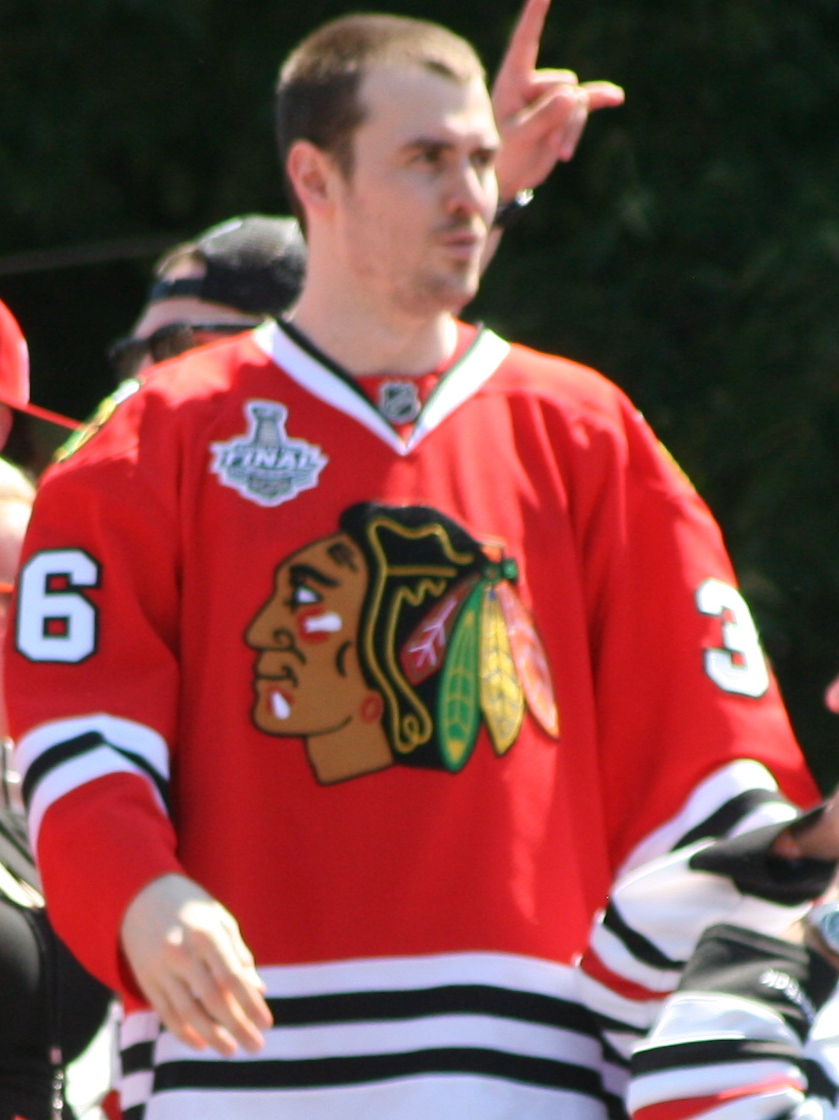
Bolland attending the Blackhawks 2013 Stanley Cup parade.

Bolland recorded 19 goals and 18 assists for 37 points in 76 contests for the Blackhawks in 2011–12 as the Blackhawks finished sixth in the West and would follow up by being goalless with three assists for three points in all six games in the Blackhawks' first round exit in the 2012 playoffs by the third-seeded Phoenix Coyotes.

Bolland would record seven goals and assists for 14 points in 35 games in the lockout-shortened 2012–13 season as the Blackhawks won the Presidents' Trophy. On April 1, 2013, Bolland suffered a foot injury in a 3–2 SO win over the Nashville Predators as a result from blocking a shot from Predators’ defenseman captain Shea Weber. He played one more game before missing the next four games. On April 22, Bolland suffered a groin injury in a 3–1 loss to the Vancouver Canucks, causing him to miss the last three games of the season and the entire first round series of the 2013 playoffs against the Minnesota Wild, which saw the Blackhawks defeat the Wild in five games. After missing all five games in the opening round against the eighth-seeded Wild, he returned to the Blackhawks line-up for the first game in the second round against the Detroit Red Wings. After initially trailing 3–1 in the series, the Blackhawks would recover by winning the next three games to defeat the seventh-seeded Red Wings in seven games with Game seven being a 2–1 victory in overtime with Bolland recording an assist on the game and the series-winning goal by Brent Seabrook. The Blackhawks would go on to defeat the defending Stanley Cup champion and fifth-seeded Los Angeles Kings in five games in the third round to clinch a spot in the 2013 Stanley Cup Final. On June 24, Bolland scored the game-winning goal in the final minute of Game six of the 2013 Stanley Cup Final over the Boston Bruins, leading the Blackhawks to their second Stanley Cup title in four years. Bolland finished the playoffs with three goals and assists for six points in 18 games.

==== Toronto Maple Leafs (2013–2014) ====
On June 30, 2013, during the 2013 NHL entry draft, the Blackhawks traded Bolland to the Toronto Maple Leafs in exchange for a second-round and fourth-round pick in 2013 and a fourth in 2014. On November 2, Bolland suffered a severed achillies tendon in a 4–0 loss to the Vancouver Canucks after being on the receiving end of a check by Canucks forward Zack Kassian, causing him to miss the next 56 games. He would finish the 2013–14 season with eight goals and four assists for 12 points in only 23 contests played.

==== Florida Panthers (2014–2016) ====
Although the Maple Leafs made attempts to resign Bolland, the team was unable to meet his reportedly high contract demands in excess of $5+ million a season, and Bolland subsequently became an unrestricted free agent.

On July 1, 2014, the opening day of free agency, the Florida Panthers signed Bolland to a five-year, $27.5 million contract ($5.5 million annually). Over the next two seasons, Bolland appeared in just 78 of a possible 164 games (53 in 2014–15 and 25 in 2015–16) due to injuries.

On August 25, 2016, looking to remove Bolland's contract constraints, the Panthers traded Bolland and recent 11th-overall pick Lawson Crouse to the Arizona Coyotes in exchange for a 2017 conditional third-round pick and a 2018 conditional second-round pick. However, the injured Bolland he never played a game for the club. Bolland's last official NHL game was December 12, 2015 (while he was still with the Panthers), and in October 2016 his agent acknowledged that he would likely never play again due to a back injury.

== Career statistics ==
=== Regular season and playoffs ===
			Regular season					Playoffs
Season	Team	League	GP	G	A	Pts	PIM	GP	G	A	Pts	PIM
2000–01	Toronto Red Wings AAA	GTHL U14	95	79	67	146	82	—	—	—	—	—
2001–02	Toronto Red Wings AAA	GTHL U15	36	35	35	70	40	—	—	—	—	—
2002–03	London Knights	OHL	64	7	10	17	21	14	2	1	3	2
2003–04	London Knights	OHL	65	37	30	67	58	15	3	10	13	18
2004–05	London Knights	OHL	66	34	51	85	97	18	11	14	25	30
2005–06	London Knights	OHL	59	57	73	130	104	15	15	9	24	41
2006–07	Norfolk Admirals	AHL	65	17	32	49	53	6	0	4	4	17
2006–07	Chicago Blackhawks	NHL	1	0	0	0	0	—	—	—	—	—
2007–08	Rockford IceHogs	AHL	16	6	4	10	22	7	0	0	0	8
2007–08	Chicago Blackhawks	NHL	39	4	13	17	28	—	—	—	—	—
2008–09	Chicago Blackhawks	NHL	81	19	28	47	52	17	4	8	12	24
2009–10	Chicago Blackhawks	NHL	39	6	10	16	28	22	8	8	16	30
2010–11	Chicago Blackhawks	NHL	61	15	22	37	34	4	2	4	6	4
2011–12	Chicago Blackhawks	NHL	76	19	18	37	47	6	0	3	3	2
2012–13	Chicago Blackhawks	NHL	35	7	7	14	22	18	3	3	6	24
2013–14	Toronto Maple Leafs	NHL	23	8	4	12	24	—	—	—	—	—
2014–15	Florida Panthers	NHL	53	6	17	23	48	—	—	—	—	—
2015–16	Florida Panthers	NHL	25	1	4	5	16	—	—	—	—	—
2015–16	Portland Pirates	AHL	2	0	1	1	0	—	—	—	—	—
NHL totals			433	85	123	208	299	67	17	26	43	84

=== International ===
Medal record

Representing Canada

World Junior Championships
Gold medal – first place	2006 Vancouver	

Year	Team	Event	Result	GP	G	A	Pts	PIM
2006	Canada	WJC	1st place, gold medalist(s)	6	3	2	5	14
Junior totals				6	3	2	5	14

== Awards and achievements ==
- 2003–04 OHL Third All-Star Team
- Played in the 2004 CHL Top Prospects Game.
- 2005 Memorial Cup Champion with London Knights
- 2004–05 OHL All-Star
- 2005–06 OHL First All-Star Team
- 2005–06 OHL Jim Mahon Memorial Trophy winner
- Captain of Team OHL in Canada/Russia Series, November 2005.
- Stanley Cup Champion (2010, 2013)
- Stanley Cup-winning goal scorer, 2013
