= 2012–13 Edmonton Oilers season =

NHL team season

2012–13 Edmonton Oilers
- Division: 3rd Northwest
- Conference: 12th Western
- 2012–13 record: 19–22–7
- Home record: 9–11–4
- Road record: 10–11–3
- Goals for: 125
- Goals against: 134

Team information
- General manager: Steve Tambellini (Oct.–Apr.); Craig MacTavish (Apr.)
- Coach: Ralph Krueger
- Captain: Shawn Horcoff
- Alternate captains: Jordan Eberle (Jan.–Apr.); Taylor Hall (Jan.–Apr.); Ales Hemsky (Oct.–Jan.); Nick Schultz (Jan.–Apr.); Ryan Whitney (Oct.–Jan.); Ryan Smyth
- Arena: Rexall Place
- Average attendance: 16,839 (100%)
- Minor league affiliates: Oklahoma City Barons (AHL); Stockton Thunder (ECHL)

Team leaders
- Goals: Nail Yakupov (17)
- Assists: Taylor Hall (34)
- Points: Taylor Hall (50)
- Penalty minutes: Ladislav Smid (55)
- Plus/minus: Shawn Horcoff; Corey Potter (+8)
- Wins: Devan Dubnyk (14)
- Goals against average: Nikolai Khabibulin (2.54)

The 2012–13 Edmonton Oilers season was the 34th season for the National Hockey League (NHL) franchise that was established on June 22, 1979, and 41st season including their play in the World Hockey Association. The regular season was reduced from its usual 82 games to 48 due to the 2012–13 NHL lockout.

The Oilers finished the season with a sub-.500 record and failed to qualify for the Stanley Cup playoffs for the seventh year in a row for the first time in franchise history.

== Off-season ==
On June 27, the Oilers named Ralph Krueger as their new head coach.

=== Arena Controversy ===
The Edmonton Oilers have been embroiled in a controversy with the city of Edmonton over a new arena. Oilers owner Daryl Katz has threatened to move the team to Seattle if a new arena is not built, which was panned by fans and politicians.

In October 2012, Elections Alberta released campaign finance statements which showed Katz, his family and business partners donated substantial amounts of money to the Progressive Conservatives in the closing days of the 2012 Alberta general election. Katz says it was to prevent the Wildrose Party from taking power and did not have to do with the arena. Contributions from him totalled almost 20% of the total donations during the election campaign for the Progressive Conservatives. Opposition parties in Alberta have asked Elections Alberta to investigate the donations, alleging they were made to ensure the province would kick in 100 million dollars towards a new arena.

== Regular season ==
=== Standings ===
Northwest Division
Pos	Team	GP	W	L	OTL	ROW	GF	GA	GD	Pts
1	y – Vancouver Canucks	48	26	15	7	21	127	121	+6	59
2	x – Minnesota Wild	48	26	19	3	22	122	127	−5	55
3	Edmonton Oilers	48	19	22	7	17	125	134	−9	45
4	Calgary Flames	48	19	25	4	19	128	160	−32	42
5	Colorado Avalanche	48	16	25	7	14	116	152	−36	39

Source: National Hockey League
x – Clinched playoff spot; y – Clinched division

Western Conference
Pos	Div	Team	GP	W	L	OTL	ROW	GF	GA	GD	Pts
1	CE	p – Chicago Blackhawks	48	36	7	5	30	155	102	+53	77
2	PA	y – Anaheim Ducks	48	30	12	6	24	140	118	+22	66
3	NW	y – Vancouver Canucks	48	26	15	7	21	127	121	+6	59
4	CE	x – St. Louis Blues	48	29	17	2	24	129	115	+14	60
5	PA	x – Los Angeles Kings	48	27	16	5	25	133	118	+15	59
6	PA	x – San Jose Sharks	48	25	16	7	17	124	116	+8	57
7	CE	x – Detroit Red Wings	48	24	16	8	22	124	115	+9	56
8	NW	x – Minnesota Wild	48	26	19	3	22	122	127	−5	55
9	CE	Columbus Blue Jackets	48	24	17	7	19	120	119	+1	55
10	PA	Phoenix Coyotes	48	21	18	9	17	125	131	−6	51
11	PA	Dallas Stars	48	22	22	4	20	130	142	−12	48
12	NW	Edmonton Oilers	48	19	22	7	17	125	134	−9	45
13	NW	Calgary Flames	48	19	25	4	19	128	160	−32	42
14	CE	Nashville Predators	48	16	23	9	14	111	139	−28	41
15	NW	Colorado Avalanche	48	16	25	7	14	116	152	−36	39

Source: National Hockey League
p – Clinched Presidents' Trophy; x – Clinched playoff spot; y – Clinched division

== Playoffs ==
For the seventh consecutive season, the Edmonton Oilers failed to qualify for the NHL Playoffs.

== Schedule and results ==
=== Regular season ===
2013 Game Log

January: 4–2–1 (Home: 2–1–0; Road: 2–1–1)
#	Date	Visitor	Score	Home	OT	Decision	Attendance	Record	Pts	Recap
1	January 20	Edmonton Oilers	3–2	Vancouver Canucks	SO	Dubnyk	18,910	1–0–0	2
2	January 22	San Jose Sharks	6–3	Edmonton Oilers		Dubnyk	16,839	1–1–0	2
3	January 24	Los Angeles Kings	1–2	Edmonton Oilers	OT	Dubnyk	16,839	2–1–0	4
4	January 26	Edmonton Oilers	3–4	Calgary Flames		Dubnyk	19,289	2–2–0	4
5	January 28	Colorado Avalanche	1–4	Edmonton Oilers		Dubnyk	16,839	3–2–0	6
6	January 30	Edmonton Oilers	2–1	Phoenix Coyotes	OT	Dubnyk	12,955	4–2–0	8
7	January 31	Edmonton Oilers	2–3	San Jose Sharks	SO	Dubnyk	17,562	4–2–1	9

February: 4–5–3 (Home: 2–3–2; Road: 2–2–1)
#	Date	Visitor	Score	Home	OT	Decision	Attendance	Record	Pts	Recap
8	February 2	Edmonton Oilers	1–3	Colorado Avalanche		Dubnyk	16,119	4–3–1	9
9	February 4	Vancouver Canucks	3–2	Edmonton Oilers	OT	Dubnyk	16,839	4–3–2	10
10	February 6	Dallas Stars	3–2	Edmonton Oilers	OT	Dubnyk	16,839	4–3–3	11
11	February 9	Edmonton Oilers	1–2	Detroit Red Wings		Khabibulin	20,066	4–4–3	11
12	February 10	Edmonton Oilers	3–1	Columbus Blue Jackets		Dubnyk	14,364	5–4–3	13
13	February 12	Dallas Stars	4–1	Edmonton Oilers		Dubnyk	16,839	5–5–3	13
14	February 16	Colorado Avalanche	4–6	Edmonton Oilers		Khabibulin	16,839	6–5–3	15
15	February 19	Los Angeles Kings	3–1	Edmonton Oilers		Khabibulin	16,839	6–6–3	15
16	February 21	Minnesota Wild	3–1	Edmonton Oilers		Dubnyk	16,839	6–7–3	15
17	February 23	Phoenix Coyotes	2–3	Edmonton Oilers	SO	Khabibulin	16,839	7–7–3	17
18	February 25	Edmonton Oilers	2–3	Chicago Blackhawks	OT	Khabibulin	21,127	7–7–4	18
19	February 28	Edmonton Oilers	5–1	Dallas Stars		Dubnyk	17,004	8–7–4	20

March: 6–6–3 (Home: 3–1–2; Road: 3–5–1)
#	Date	Visitor	Score	Home	OT	Decision	Attendance	Record	Pts	Recap
20	March 1	Edmonton Oilers	2–4	St. Louis Blues		Dubnyk	19,476	8–8–4	20
21	March 3	Edmonton Oilers	2–4	Minnesota Wild		Dubnyk	18,675	8–9–4	20
22	March 5	Edmonton Oilers	3–4	Columbus Blue Jackets	SO	Dubnyk	14,952	8–9–5	21
23	March 7	Edmonton Oilers	0–3	Detroit Red Wings		Dubnyk	20,066	8–10–5	21
24	March 8	Edmonton Oilers	0–6	Nashville Predators		Dubnyk	17,277	8–11–5	21
25	March 10	Edmonton Oilers	6–5	Chicago Blackhawks		Danis	22,020	9–11–5	23
26	March 12	Edmonton Oilers	4–0	Colorado Avalanche		Dubnyk	14,360	10–11–5	25
27	March 15	Detroit Red Wings	3–2	Edmonton Oilers	OT	Dubnyk	16,839	10–11–6	26
28	March 17	Nashville Predators	2–3	Edmonton Oilers		Dubnyk	16,839	11–11–6	28
29	March 20	San Jose Sharks	4–3	Edmonton Oilers	SO	Dubnyk	16,839	11–11–7	29
30	March 23	St. Louis Blues	3–0	Edmonton Oilers		Khabibulin	16,839	11–12–7	29
31	March 25	Edmonton Oilers	2–3	Nashville Predators		Dubnyk	17,113	11–13–7	29
32	March 26	Edmonton Oilers	3–0	St. Louis Blues		Khabibulin	17,260	12–13–7	31
33	March 28	Columbus Blue Jackets	4–6	Edmonton Oilers		Dubnyk	16,839	13–13–7	33
34	March 30	Vancouver Canucks	0–4	Edmonton Oilers		Dubnyk	16,839	14–13–7	35

April: 5–9–0 (Home: 2–6–0; Road: 3–3–0)
#	Date	Visitor	Score	Home	OT	Decision	Attendance	Record	Pts	Recap
35	April 1	Calgary Flames	1–4	Edmonton Oilers		Dubnyk	16,839	15–13–7	37
36	April 3	Edmonton Oilers	8–2	Calgary Flames		Dubnyk	19,289	16–13–7	39
37	April 4	Edmonton Oilers	0–4	Vancouver Canucks		Khabibulin	18,910	16–14–7	39
38	April 6	Edmonton Oilers	1–4	Los Angeles Kings		Dubnyk	18,118	16–15–7	39
39	April 8	Edmonton Oilers	1–2	Anaheim Ducks		Dubnyk	15,148	16–16–7	39
40	April 10	Phoenix Coyotes	3–1	Edmonton Oilers		Dubnyk	16,839	16–17–7	39
41	April 13	Calgary Flames	4–1	Edmonton Oilers		Khabibulin	16,839	16–18–7	39
42	April 16	Minnesota Wild	5–3	Edmonton Oilers		Dubnyk	16,839	16–19–7	39
43	April 19	Edmonton Oilers	4–1	Colorado Avalanche		Dubnyk	15,890	17–19–7	41
44	April 21	Anaheim Ducks	3–1	Edmonton Oilers		Dubnyk	16,839	17–20–7	41
45	April 22	Anaheim Ducks	3–0	Edmonton Oilers		Khabibulin	16,839	17–21–7	41
46	April 24	Chicago Blackhawks	4–1	Edmonton Oilers		Dubnyk	16,839	17–22–7	41
47	April 26	Edmonton Oilers	6–1	Minnesota Wild		Khabibulin	19,090	18–22–7	43
48	April 27	Vancouver Canucks	2–7	Edmonton Oilers		Dubnyk	16,839	19–22–7	45

Legend: Win (2 points) Loss (0 points) Overtime/shootout loss (1 point)

== Player statistics ==
Final stats

Skaters

Regular season
Player	GP	G	A	Pts	+/-	PIM
Taylor Hall	45	16	34	50	5	33
Sam Gagner	48	14	24	38	−6	23
Jordan Eberle	48	16	21	37	−4	16
Nail Yakupov	48	17	14	31	−4	24
Justin Schultz	48	8	19	27	−17	8
Ryan Nugent-Hopkins	40	4	20	24	3	8
Ales Hemsky	38	9	11	20	−6	16
Magnus Paajarvi	42	9	7	16	−1	14
Ryan Smyth	47	2	11	13	−5	40
Ryan Whitney	34	4	9	13	−7	23
Shawn Horcoff	31	7	5	12	8	24
Jeff Petry	48	3	9	12	1	29
Nick Schultz	48	1	8	9	−13	24
Lennart Petrell	35	3	6	9	−4	4
Ryan Jones	27	2	5	7	0	17
Mark Fistric	25	0	6	6	6	32
Corey Potter	33	3	1	4	8	6
Ladislav Smid	48	1	3	4	−1	55
Eric Belanger	26	0	3	3	−1	10
Teemu Hartikainen	23	1	2	3	−8	6
Ben Eager	14	1	1	2	−4	25
Jerred Smithson^{†}	10	1	0	1	0	2
Mike Brown	27	1	0	1	−8	53
Anton Lander	11	0	1	1	−4	2
Darcy Hordichuk	4	0	0	0	−1	2
Chris VandeVelde	11	0	0	0	−3	4
Theo Peckham	4	0	0	0	−1	6
Mark Arcobello	1	0	0	0	0	0

Goaltenders

Regular season
Player	GP	GS	TOI	W	L	OT	GA	GAA	SA	SV%	SO	G	A	PIM
Devan Dubnyk	38	37	2100:57	14	16	6	90	2.57	1132	.920	2	0	0	0
Nikolai Khabibulin	12	11	683:37	4	6	1	29	2.54	376	.923	1	0	0	0
Yann Danis	3	0	110:15	1	0	0	7	3.82	59	.881	0	0	0	0

^{†}Denotes player spent time with another team before joining the Oilers. Stats reflect time with the Oilers only.
^{‡}Traded mid-season
Bold/italics denotes franchise record

== Awards and records ==
=== Awards ===
Regular season
Player	Award	Reached
Taylor Hall	NHL 3rd Star of the Week	April 1, 2013
Nail Yakupov	NHL Rookie of the Month	April 2013

Taylor Hall was also third in the voting among left-wingers for All-Star voting. Alexander Ovechkin finished second, despite the fact that Ovechkin played only four games on the left wing, with the remainder being played at right wing, where he was voted to the First All-Star Team. This prompted Professional Hockey Writers' Association President Kevin Allen to state, "We are troubled by the All-Star voting results, and plan to take a closer look at the events that led to Ovechkin winning All-Star acclaim at two positions... We know we got this wrong, and our objective is to make sure it never happens again."

=== Records ===
- 23: Tied Oilers record for most shots on goal in the period (1st period) on February 16, 2013.
- 56: New Oilers record for most shots on goal in the game on February 16, 2013.
- 2:43: New Oilers record for fastest three goals from start of a game by Taylor Hall at 0:16, Ladislav Smid at 2:05, and Taylor Hall at 2:43 on March 30, 2013.
- 3:35: New Oilers record for fastest five goals by Justin Schultz at 13:17, Nail Yakupov at 14:16, Jordan Eberle at 14:37, Nail Yakupov at 15:47, and Jerred Smithson at 16:52 in the 3rd period on April 27, 2013.
- 7:53: New Oilers record for fastest hat-trick from start of a game by Taylor Hall on March 30, 2013.

=== Milestones ===
Regular season
Player	Milestone	Reached
Justin Schultz	1st NHL Game	January 20, 2013
Nail Yakupov	1st NHL Game	January 20, 2013
Nail Yakupov	1st NHL Goal; 1st NHL Point	January 22, 2013
Justin Schultz	1st NHL Goal; 1st NHL Point	January 22, 2013
Justin Schultz	1st NHL Assist	January 24, 2013
Taylor Hall	100th NHL Point	January 26, 2013
Eric Belanger	800th NHL Game	January 30, 2013
Nail Yakupov	1st NHL Assist	January 31, 2013
Mark Arcobello	1st NHL Game	February 6, 2013
Ryan Smyth	900th NHL PIM	February 6, 2013
Ben Eager	400th NHL Game	March 8, 2013
Shawn Horcoff	500th NHL PIM	March 25, 2013
Sam Gagner	400th NHL Game	March 30, 2013
Taylor Hall	3rd NHL Hat-trick	March 30, 2013
Ryan Whitney	1st NHL Gordie Howe hat trick	April 3, 2013
Nick Schultz	800th NHL Game	April 4, 2013
Ryan Nugent-Hopkins	100th NHL Game	April 13, 2013
Sam Gagner	200th NHL PIM	April 16, 2013
Corey Potter	100th NHL Game	April 21, 2013
Nail Yakupov	1st NHL Hat-trick	April 27, 2013

== Transactions ==
The Oilers have been involved in the following transactions during the 2012–13 season.

=== Trades ===
Date	Details
January 14, 2013	To Dallas Stars 3rd-round pick in 2013	To Edmonton Oilers Mark Fistric
March 4, 2013	To Toronto Maple Leafs 4th-round pick in 2014	To Edmonton Oilers Mike Brown
March 29, 2013	To Phoenix Coyotes Tobias Rieder	To Edmonton Oilers Kale Kessy
April 2, 2013	To Washington Capitals Dane Byers	To Edmonton Oilers Garrett Stafford
April 3, 2013	To Florida Panthers 4th-round pick in 2013	To Edmonton Oilers Jerred Smithson

=== Free agents signed ===
Date	Player	Former team	Contract terms
July 1, 2012	Justin Schultz	University of Wisconsin	2 years, $1.85 million entry-level contract
July 5, 2012	Dane Byers	Columbus Blue Jackets	1 year, $560,000
April 17, 2013	Andrew Miller	Yale University	1 year, $842,500 entry-level contract
May 30, 2013	Anton Belov	Avangard Omsk	1 year, $925,000 entry-level contract

=== Free agents lost ===
Date	Player	New team	Contract terms
July 1, 2012	Taylor Chorney	St. Louis Blues	1 year, $575,000
July 5, 2012	Hunter Tremblay	St. John's IceCaps	undisclosed
July 12, 2012	Ryan Keller	Geneve-Servette HC	undisclosed
July 20, 2012	Josh Green	Oklahoma City Barons	
August 29, 2012	Linus Omark	EV Zug	1 year
January 13, 2013	Cam Barker	Vancouver Canucks	1 year, $700,000
May 4, 2013	Niko Hovinen	Metallurg Novokuznetsk	

=== Claimed via waivers ===
Player	Former team	Date claimed off waivers
Niko Hovinen	Philadelphia Flyers	January 25, 2013

=== Lost via waivers ===
Player	New team	Date claimed off waivers

=== Player signings ===
Player	Date	Contract terms
Lennart Petrell	June 19, 2012	1 year, $825,000 contract extension
David Musil	June 30, 2012	3 years, $2.775 million entry-level contract
Yann Danis	July 1, 2012	1 year, $775,000
Ryan Smyth	July 1, 2012	2 years, $4.5 million
Darcy Hordichuk	July 1, 2012	1 year, $850,000
Devan Dubnyk	July 5, 2012	2 years, $7 million
Jeff Petry	July 5, 2012	2 years, $3.5 million
Theo Peckham	July 16, 2012	1 year, $1.075 million
Sam Gagner	July 20, 2012	1 year, $3.2 million
Nail Yakupov	July 23, 2012	3 years, $2.775 million entry-level contract
Alex Plante	July 26, 2012	1 year, $625,000
Chris VandeVelde	July 26, 2012	1 year, $714,000
Taylor Hall	August 22, 2012	7 years, $42 million contract extension
Jordan Eberle	August 30, 2012	6 years, $36 million contract extension
Travis Ewanyk	March 22, 2013	3 years, $2.14 million entry-level contract
Ladislav Smid	April 1, 2013	4 years, $14 million contract extension
Kale Kessy	April 6, 2013	3 years, $1.895 million entry-level contract
Martin Gernat	April 20, 2013	3 years, $2.2375 million entry-level contract
Frans Tuohimaa	April 25, 2013	2 years, $1.195 million entry-level contract
Mark Arcobello	May 14, 2013	1 year, $600,000 contract extension

== Draft picks ==
Edmonton's picks at the 2012 NHL entry draft in Pittsburgh, Pennsylvania. The Oilers possessed the first overall pick for the third-straight season.

Round	#	Player	Position	Nationality	College/Junior/Club team (League)
1	1	Nail Yakupov	(RW)	Russia	Sarnia Sting (OHL)
2	32	Mitchell Moroz	(LW)	Canada	Edmonton Oil Kings (WHL)
3	63	Jujhar Khaira	(LW)	Canada	Prince George Spruce Kings (BCHL)
3	91 (from Los Angeles)	Daniil Zharkov	(LW)	Russia	Belleville Bulls (OHL)
4	93	Erik Gustafsson	(D)	Sweden	Djurgardens IF (Elitserien)
5	123	Joey LaLeggia	(D)	Canada	University of Denver (WCHA)
6	153	John McCarron	(RW)	United States	Cornell University (ECAC)

- The Oilers' seventh-round pick went to the Los Angeles Kings as the result of a June 26, 2011, trade that sent Ryan Smyth to the Oilers in exchange for Colin Fraser and this pick.

== See also ==
- 2012–13 NHL season
