= 2012–13 Nashville Predators season =

Professional ice hockey team season

2012–13 Nashville Predators
- Division: 5th Central
- Conference: 14th Western
- 2012–13 record: 16–23–9
- Home record: 11–9–4
- Road record: 5–14–5
- Goals for: 111
- Goals against: 139

Team information
- General manager: David Poile
- Coach: Barry Trotz
- Captain: Shea Weber
- Alternate captains: Martin Erat (Oct.–Apr.); Mike Fisher; David Legwand (Apr.)
- Arena: Bridgestone Arena
- Average attendance: 17,113 (100%) (2 games)

Team leaders
- Goals: David Legwand (12)
- Assists: Shea Weber (19)
- Points: Shea Weber (28)
- Penalty minutes: Rich Clune (113)
- Plus/minus: Mike Fisher (+6)
- Wins: Pekka Rinne (15)
- Goals against average: Pekka Rinne (2.43)

The 2012–13 Nashville Predators season was the team's 15th season in the National Hockey League (NHL). The regular season was reduced from its usual 82 games to 48 due to the 2012–13 NHL lockout.

== Off-season ==
After already losing one half of their All-Star defensive core to free agency when Ryan Suter signed with the Minnesota Wild, on July 19, 2012, Shea Weber signed an offer sheet from the Philadelphia Flyers. The Predators had seven days to decide whether to match the offer, opting to do so on July 24 to keep Weber in a Predators uniform.

== Regular season ==
The Predators scored 109 goals (excluding three shootout-winning goals) over the lockout-shortened season of 48 games, tied for 30th overall with the Florida Panthers. The Predators were also shut out a league-high nine times, tied with the Phoenix Coyotes.

=== Standings ===
Central Division
| Pos | Team | GP | W | L | OTL | ROW | GF | GA | GD | Pts |
|---|---|---|---|---|---|---|---|---|---|---|
| 1 | p – Chicago Blackhawks | 48 | 36 | 7 | 5 | 30 | 155 | 102 | +53 | 77 |
| 2 | x – St. Louis Blues | 48 | 29 | 17 | 2 | 24 | 129 | 115 | +14 | 60 |
| 3 | x – Detroit Red Wings | 48 | 24 | 16 | 8 | 22 | 124 | 115 | +9 | 56 |
| 4 | Columbus Blue Jackets | 48 | 24 | 17 | 7 | 19 | 120 | 119 | +1 | 55 |
| 5 | Nashville Predators | 48 | 16 | 23 | 9 | 14 | 111 | 139 | −28 | 41 |

Source: National Hockey League
p – Clinched Presidents' Trophy; x – Clinched playoff spot

Western Conference
| Pos | Div | Team | GP | W | L | OTL | ROW | GF | GA | GD | Pts |
|---|---|---|---|---|---|---|---|---|---|---|---|
| 1 | CE | p – Chicago Blackhawks | 48 | 36 | 7 | 5 | 30 | 155 | 102 | +53 | 77 |
| 2 | PA | y – Anaheim Ducks | 48 | 30 | 12 | 6 | 24 | 140 | 118 | +22 | 66 |
| 3 | NW | y – Vancouver Canucks | 48 | 26 | 15 | 7 | 21 | 127 | 121 | +6 | 59 |
| 4 | CE | x – St. Louis Blues | 48 | 29 | 17 | 2 | 24 | 129 | 115 | +14 | 60 |
| 5 | PA | x – Los Angeles Kings | 48 | 27 | 16 | 5 | 25 | 133 | 118 | +15 | 59 |
| 6 | PA | x – San Jose Sharks | 48 | 25 | 16 | 7 | 17 | 124 | 116 | +8 | 57 |
| 7 | CE | x – Detroit Red Wings | 48 | 24 | 16 | 8 | 22 | 124 | 115 | +9 | 56 |
| 8 | NW | x – Minnesota Wild | 48 | 26 | 19 | 3 | 22 | 122 | 127 | −5 | 55 |
| 9 | CE | Columbus Blue Jackets | 48 | 24 | 17 | 7 | 19 | 120 | 119 | +1 | 55 |
| 10 | PA | Phoenix Coyotes | 48 | 21 | 18 | 9 | 17 | 125 | 131 | −6 | 51 |
| 11 | PA | Dallas Stars | 48 | 22 | 22 | 4 | 20 | 130 | 142 | −12 | 48 |
| 12 | NW | Edmonton Oilers | 48 | 19 | 22 | 7 | 17 | 125 | 134 | −9 | 45 |
| 13 | NW | Calgary Flames | 48 | 19 | 25 | 4 | 19 | 128 | 160 | −32 | 42 |
| 14 | CE | Nashville Predators | 48 | 16 | 23 | 9 | 14 | 111 | 139 | −28 | 41 |
| 15 | NW | Colorado Avalanche | 48 | 16 | 25 | 7 | 14 | 116 | 152 | −36 | 39 |

Source: National Hockey League
p – Clinched Presidents' Trophy; x – Clinched playoff spot; y – Clinched division

=== Game log ===
2012–13 game log

January: 2–2–3 (home: 0–0–2; road: 2–2–1)
| # | Date | Visitor | Score | Home | OT | Decision | Attendance | Record | Pts | Recap |
|---|---|---|---|---|---|---|---|---|---|---|
| 1 | January 19 | Columbus Blue Jackets | 3–2 | Nashville Predators | SO | Rinne | 17,113 | 0–0–1 | 1 | Recap |
| 2 | January 21 | St. Louis Blues | 4–3 | Nashville Predators | SO | Rinne | 17,113 | 0–0–2 | 2 | Recap |
| 3 | January 22 | Nashville Predators | 3–1 | Minnesota Wild | — | Mason | 17,540 | 1–0–2 | 4 | Recap |
| 4 | January 24 | Nashville Predators | 0–3 | St. Louis Blues | — | Rinne | 16,047 | 1–1–2 | 4 | Recap |
| 5 | January 26 | Nashville Predators | 2–3 | Anaheim Ducks | SO | Rinne | 17,174 | 1–1–3 | 5 | Recap |
| 6 | January 28 | Nashville Predators | 0–4 | Phoenix Coyotes | — | Rinne | 8,581 | 1–2–3 | 5 | Recap |
| 7 | January 31 | Nashville Predators | 2–1 | Los Angeles Kings | SO | Rinne | 18,118 | 2–2–3 | 7 | Recap |

February: 5–2–2 (home: 3–1–1; road: 2–1–1)
| # | Date | Visitor | Score | Home | OT | Decision | Attendance | Record | Pts | Recap |
|---|---|---|---|---|---|---|---|---|---|---|
| 8 | February 2 | Nashville Predators | 2–1 | San Jose Sharks | SO | Rinne | 17,562 | 3–2–3 | 9 | Recap |
| 9 | February 5 | Nashville Predators | 6–1 | St. Louis Blues | — | Rinne | 15,206 | 4–2–3 | 11 | Recap |
| 10 | February 7 | Los Angeles Kings | 0–3 | Nashville Predators | — | Rinne | 17,113 | 5–2–3 | 13 | Recap |
| 11 | February 9 | Nashville Predators | 1–2 | Minnesota Wild | OT | Mason | 18,806 | 5–2–4 | 14 | Recap |
| 12 | February 10 | Chicago Blackhawks | 3–0 | Nashville Predators | — | Rinne | 17,113 | 5–3–4 | 14 | Recap |
| 13 | February 12 | San Jose Sharks | 0–1 | Nashville Predators | OT | Rinne | 17,113 | 6–3–4 | 16 | Recap |
| 14 | February 14 | Phoenix Coyotes | 0–3 | Nashville Predators | — | Rinne | 17,113 | 7–3–4 | 18 | Recap |
| 15 | February 16 | Anaheim Ducks | 3–2 | Nashville Predators | SO | Rinne | 17,322 | 7–3–5 | 19 | Recap |
| 16 | February 18 | Nashville Predators | 5–6 | Colorado Avalanche | — | Mason | 15,099 | 7–4–5 | 19 | Recap |
| 17 | February 19 | Detroit Red Wings | 3–4 | Nashville Predators | OT | Rinne | 17,113 | 8–4–5 | 21 | Recap |
| 18 | February 22 | Vancouver Canucks | 1–0 | Nashville Predators | — | Rinne | 17,113 | 8–5–5 | 21 | Recap |
| 19 | February 23 | Nashville Predators | 0–4 | Detroit Red Wings | — | Rinne | 20,066 | 8–6–5 | 21 | Recap |
| 20 | February 25 | Dallas Stars | 4–5 | Nashville Predators | OT | Rinne | 17,113 | 9–6–5 | 23 | Recap |
| 21 | February 27 | Nashville Predators | 1–5 | Anaheim Ducks | — | Rinne | 13,630 | 9–7–5 | 23 | Recap |

March: 5–7–2 (home: 4–1–1; road: 1–6–1)
| # | Date | Visitor | Score | Home | OT | Decision | Attendance | Record | Pts | Recap |
|---|---|---|---|---|---|---|---|---|---|---|
| 22 | March 2 | Nashville Predators | 1–2 | San Jose Sharks | — | Rinne | 17,562 | 9–8–5 | 23 | Recap |
| 23 | March 4 | Nashville Predators | 1–5 | Los Angeles Kings | — | Rinne | 18,118 | 9–9–5 | 23 | Recap |
| 24 | March 8 | Edmonton Oilers | 0–6 | Nashville Predators | — | Rinne | 17,277 | 10–9–5 | 25 | Recap |
| 25 | March 9 | Minnesota Wild | 2–1 | Nashville Predators | SO | Rinne | 17,113 | 10–9–6 | 26 | Recap |
| 26 | March 12 | Nashville Predators | 4–0 | Dallas Stars | — | Rinne | 15,661 | 11–9–6 | 28 | Recap |
| 27 | March 14 | Nashville Predators | 4–7 | Vancouver Canucks | — | Mason | 18,910 | 11–10–6 | 28 | Recap |
| 28 | March 15 | Nashville Predators | 3–6 | Calgary Flames | — | Mason | 19,289 | 11–11–6 | 28 | Recap |
| 29 | March 17 | Nashville Predators | 2–3 | Edmonton Oilers | — | Rinne | 16,839 | 11–12–6 | 28 | Recap |
| 30 | March 19 | Nashville Predators | 3–4 | Columbus Blue Jackets | — | Rinne | 13,364 | 11–13–6 | 28 | Recap |
| 31 | March 21 | Calgary Flames | 3–5 | Nashville Predators | — | Rinne | 17,113 | 12–13–6 | 30 | Recap |
| 32 | March 23 | Columbus Blue Jackets | 2–5 | Nashville Predators | — | Rinne | 17,113 | 13–13–6 | 32 | Recap |
| 33 | March 25 | Edmonton Oilers | 2–3 | Nashville Predators | — | Rinne | 17,113 | 14–13–6 | 34 | Recap |
| 34 | March 28 | Phoenix Coyotes | 7–4 | Nashville Predators | — | Mason | 17,113 | 14–14–6 | 34 | Recap |
| 35 | March 30 | Nashville Predators | 0–1 | Colorado Avalanche | OT | Rinne | 15,324 | 14–14–7 | 35 | Recap |

April: 2–9–2 (home: 2–6–0; road: 0–3–2)
| # | Date | Visitor | Score | Home | OT | Decision | Attendance | Record | Pts | Recap |
|---|---|---|---|---|---|---|---|---|---|---|
| 36 | April 1 | Nashville Predators | 2–3 | Chicago Blackhawks | SO | Rinne | 21,306 | 14–14–8 | 36 | Recap |
| 37 | April 2 | Colorado Avalanche | 1–3 | Nashville Predators | — | Rinne | 16,211 | 15–14–8 | 38 | Recap |
| 38 | April 4 | Columbus Blue Jackets | 3–1 | Nashville Predators | — | Rinne | 17,113 | 15–15–8 | 38 | Recap |
| 39 | April 6 | Chicago Blackhawks | 1–0 | Nashville Predators | — | Rinne | 17,256 | 15–16–8 | 38 | Recap |
| 40 | April 7 | Nashville Predators | 3–5 | Chicago Blackhawks | — | Rinne | 22,044 | 15–17–8 | 38 | Recap |
| 41 | April 9 | St. Louis Blues | 1–0 | Nashville Predators | — | Rinne | 15,063 | 15–18–8 | 38 | Recap |
| 42 | April 12 | Dallas Stars | 5–2 | Nashville Predators | — | Mason | 16,818 | 15–19–8 | 38 | Recap |
| 43 | April 14 | Detroit Red Wings | 3–0 | Nashville Predators | — | Rinne | 17,113 | 15–20–8 | 38 | Recap |
| 44 | April 15 | Vancouver Canucks | 5–2 | Nashville Predators | — | Rinne | 16,518 | 15–21–8 | 38 | Recap |
| 45 | April 19 | Nashville Predators | 4–5 | Chicago Blackhawks | OT | Rinne | 22,014 | 15–21–9 | 39 | Recap |
| 46 | April 23 | Calgary Flames | 3–4 | Nashville Predators | — | Rinne | 17,113 | 16–21–9 | 41 | Recap |
| 47 | April 25 | Nashville Predators | 2–5 | Detroit Red Wings | — | Mason | 20,066 | 16–22–9 | 41 | Recap |
| 48 | April 27 | Nashville Predators | 1–3 | Columbus Blue Jackets | — | Mason | 19,002 | 16–23–9 | 41 | Recap |

Legend: = Win = Loss = OT/SO Loss

== Playoffs ==
For the first time since the 2008-09 season, the Predators missed the playoffs.

== Player stats ==
Final stats

=== Skaters ===
Regular season
| Player | GP | G | A | Pts | +/- | PIM |
|---|---|---|---|---|---|---|
| Shea Weber | 48 | 9 | 19 | 28 | −2 | 48 |
| David Legwand | 48 | 12 | 13 | 25 | −6 | 20 |
| Mike Fisher | 38 | 10 | 11 | 21 | 6 | 27 |
| Martin Erat^{‡} | 36 | 4 | 17 | 21 | −7 | 26 |
| Colin Wilson | 25 | 7 | 12 | 19 | 1 | 4 |
| Roman Josi | 48 | 5 | 13 | 18 | −7 | 8 |
| Gabriel Bourque | 34 | 11 | 5 | 16 | 6 | 4 |
| Sergei Kostitsyn | 46 | 3 | 12 | 15 | −5 | 11 |
| Kevin Klein | 47 | 3 | 11 | 14 | −1 | 9 |
| Patric Hornqvist | 24 | 4 | 10 | 14 | −1 | 14 |
| Nick Spaling | 47 | 9 | 4 | 13 | −10 | 18 |
| Craig Smith | 44 | 4 | 8 | 12 | −11 | 20 |
| Matthew Halischuk | 36 | 5 | 6 | 11 | 1 | 10 |
| Rich Clune | 47 | 4 | 5 | 9 | 3 | 113 |
| Bobby Butler^{†} | 20 | 3 | 6 | 9 | −2 | 4 |
| Brandon Yip | 34 | 3 | 5 | 8 | −3 | 26 |
| Victor Bartley | 24 | 0 | 7 | 7 | 2 | 6 |
| Jonathon Blum | 35 | 1 | 6 | 7 | −1 | 6 |
| Taylor Beck | 16 | 3 | 4 | 7 | 0 | 2 |
| Ryan Ellis | 32 | 2 | 4 | 6 | −2 | 15 |
| Paul Gaustad | 23 | 2 | 3 | 5 | −1 | 20 |
| Chris Mueller | 18 | 2 | 3 | 5 | −4 | 6 |
| Daniel Bang | 8 | 0 | 2 | 2 | −2 | 0 |
| Zach Boychuk^{†‡} | 5 | 1 | 1 | 2 | 1 | 4 |
| Kevin Henderson | 4 | 1 | 0 | 1 | −1 | 0 |
| Austin Watson | 6 | 1 | 0 | 1 | −2 | 0 |
| Joonas Rask | 2 | 0 | 1 | 1 | −1 | 0 |
| Filip Forsberg | 5 | 0 | 1 | 1 | −5 | 0 |
| Scott Hannan^{‡} | 29 | 0 | 1 | 1 | −11 | 20 |
| Hal Gill | 32 | 0 | 0 | 0 | −3 | 12 |
| Mattias Ekholm | 1 | 0 | 0 | 0 | −1 | 0 |
| Brian McGrattan^{‡} | 2 | 0 | 0 | 0 | 0 | 0 |
| Totals | 8 | 12 | 17 | 29 | −11 | 95 |

=== Goaltenders ===
Regular season
| Player | GP | GS | TOI | W | L | OT | GA | GAA | SA | SV% | SO | G | A | PIM |
|---|---|---|---|---|---|---|---|---|---|---|---|---|---|---|
| Pekka Rinne | 43 | 42 | 2443:46 | 15 | 16 | 8 | 99 | 2.43 | 1101 | .910 | 5 | 0 | 1 | 8 |
| Chris Mason | 11 | 6 | 466:44 | 1 | 7 | 1 | 29 | 3.73 | 229 | .873 | 0 | 0 | 0 | 0 |
| Totals | | 48 | 2910:30 | 16 | 23 | 9 | 128 | 2.64 | 1330 | .904 | 5 | 0 | 1 | 8 |

^{†}Denotes player spent time with another team before joining the Predators. Stats reflect time with the Predators only.
^{‡}Traded mid-season
Bold/italics denotes franchise record

== Transactions ==
The Predators have been involved in the following transactions during the 2012–13 season.

=== Trades ===
| Date | Details |
| June 15, 2012 | To Tampa Bay Lightning Anders Lindback; Kyle Wilson; 7th-round pick in 2012 | To Nashville Predators Sebastien Caron; 2nd-round pick in 2012; 2nd-round pick in 2012; 3rd-round pick in 2013 |
| June 23, 2012 | To New York Rangers 3rd-round pick in 2013 | To Nashville Predators 3rd-round pick in 2012 |
| June 23, 2012 | To New York Rangers 5th-round pick in 2012 | To Nashville Predators 5th-round pick in 2013 |
| February 19, 2013 | To St. Louis Blues Jani Lajunen | To Nashville Predators Scott Ford |
| February 28, 2013 | To Calgary Flames Brian McGrattan | To Nashville Predators Joe Piskula |
| April 3, 2013 | To San Jose Sharks Scott Hannan | To Nashville Predators Conditional 7th-round pick in 2013 (Note: Condition satisfied.) |
| April 3, 2013 | To Washington Capitals Martin Erat; Michael Latta | To Nashville Predators Filip Forsberg |
| June 14, 2013 | To Florida Panthers Bobby Butler | To Nashville Predators T. J. Brennan |

=== Free agents signed ===
| Player | Former team | Contract terms |
| Kevin Henderson | Milwaukee Admirals | 1 year, $550,000 |
| Chris Mason | Winnipeg Jets | 1 year, $1.25 million |
| Mike Moore | Worcester Sharks | 1 year, $550,000 |
| Scott Hannan | Calgary Flames | 1 year, $1 million |
| Mark Van Guilder | Milwaukee Admirals | 2 years, $1.1 million |

=== Free agents lost ===
| Player | New team | Contract terms |
| Francis Bouillon | Montreal Canadiens | 1 year, $1.5 million |
| Jordin Tootoo | Detroit Red Wings | 3 years, $5.7 million |
| Alexander Radulov | CSKA Moscow | 4 years, $36.8 million |
| Jack Hillen | Washington Capitals | 1 year, $650,000 |
| Ryan Suter | Minnesota Wild | 13 years, $98 million |

=== Claimed via waivers ===
| Player | Former team | Date claimed off waivers |
|---|---|---|
| Richard Clune | Los Angeles Kings | January 15, 2013 |
| Bobby Butler | New Jersey Devils | March 4, 2013 |
| Zach Boychuk | Pittsburgh Penguins | March 5, 2013 |

=== Lost via waivers ===
| Player | New team | Date claimed off waivers |
|---|---|---|
| Zach Boychuk | Carolina Hurricanes | March 21, 2013 |

=== Player signings ===
| Player | Date | Contract terms |
| Magnus Hellberg | June 18, 2012 | 3 years, $2.3425 million entry-level contract |
| Chris Mueller | June 21, 2012 | 1 year, $550,000 |
| Brandon Yip | June 21, 2012 | 1 year, $750,000 |
| Hal Gill | June 28, 2012 | 2 years, $4 million |
| Paul Gaustad | July 1, 2012 | 4 years, $13 million |
| Brian McGrattan | July 1, 2012 | 1 year, $600,000 |
| Jeremy Smith | July 17, 2012 | 1 year, $660,000 |
| Jack MacLellan | July 23, 2012 | 1 year, $600,000 |
| Sergei Kostitsyn | July 23, 2012 | 2 years, $6 million |
| Colin Wilson | July 24, 2012 | 3 years, $6 million |
| Shea Weber | July 24, 2012 | 14 years, $110 million |
| Mike Fisher | August 20, 2012 | 2 years, $8.4 million contract extension |
| Colton Sissons | September 13, 2012 | 3 years, $1.97 million entry-level contract |
| Jonathon Blum | September 13, 2012 | 1 year, $650,000 |
| Gabriel Bourque | September 14, 2012 | 2 years, $1.55 million contract extension |
| Kevin Klein | September 15, 2012 | 5 years, $14.5 million contract extension |
| Craig Smith | September 15, 2012 | 2 years, $4 million contract extension |
| Zach Budish | April 3, 2013 | 2 years, $1.33 million entry-level contract |
| Miikka Salomaki | April 24, 2013 | 3 years, $2.3425 million entry-level contract |
| Patric Hornqvist | April 30, 2013 | 5 years, $21.25 million contract extension |
| Marek Mazanec | May 3, 2013 | 2 years, $1.22 million entry-level contract |
| Brendan Leipsic | May 23, 2013 | 3 years, $2.0525 million entry-level contract |
| Mikko Vainonen | May 24, 2013 | 3 years, $1.87 million entry-level contract |
| Roman Josi | June 10, 2013 | 7 years, $28 million |
| Joe Piskula | June 17, 2013 | 1 year, $550,000 |
| Kevin Henderson | June 18, 2013 | 2 years, $1.1 million |
| Victor Bartley | June 19, 2013 | 3 years, $2 million |

== Draft picks ==
Nashville's picks at the 2012 NHL entry draft in Pittsburgh, Pennsylvania.

| Round | Pick | Player | Position | Nationality | Previous Team |
|---|---|---|---|---|---|
| 2 | 37 (from Minnesota) | Pontus Aberg | LW | Sweden | Djurgardens IF J20 (J20 SuperElit) |
| 2 | 50 (from Philadelphia) | Colton Sissons | C | Canada | Kelowna Rockets (WHL) |
| 3 | 66 (from Toronto) | Jimmy Vesey | LW | United States | South Shore Kings (EJHL) |
| 3 | 89 (from NY Rangers) | Brendan Leipsic | LW | Canada | Portland Winterhawks (WHL) |
| 4 | 112 | Zach Stepan | C | United States | Shattuck-Saint Mary's (Midget AAA) |
| 4 | 118 (from Phoenix) | Mikko Vainonen | D | Finland | HIFK U20 (Jr. A SM-liiga) |
| 6 | 164 (from Dallas) | Simon Fernholm | D | Sweden | Huddinge IK J20 (J20 SuperElit) |
| 6 | 172 | Max Gortz | RW | Sweden | Farjestad BK J20 (J20 SuperElit) |
| 6 | 179 (from NY Rangers) | Marek Mazanec | G | Czech Republic | HC Plzen (Czech Extraliga) |

== See also ==
- 2012–13 NHL season
