= 2012–13 San Jose Sharks season =

National Hockey League team season

2012–13 San Jose Sharks
- Division: 3rd Pacific
- Conference: 6th Western
- 2012–13 record: 25–16–7
- Home record: 17–2–5
- Road record: 8–14–2
- Goals for: 124
- Goals against: 116

Team information
- General manager: Doug Wilson
- Coach: Todd McLellan
- Captain: Joe Thornton
- Alternate captains: Dan Boyle; Ryane Clowe (Oct.–Apr.); Patrick Marleau
- Arena: HP Pavilion at San Jose
- Average attendance: 17,562

Team leaders
- Goals: Logan Couture (21)
- Assists: Joe Thornton (33)
- Points: Joe Thornton (40)
- Penalty minutes: Ryane Clowe (79)
- Plus/minus: Logan Couture; Martin Havlat (+7)
- Wins: Antti Niemi (24)
- Goals against average: Antti Niemi (2.14)

The 2012–13 San Jose Sharks season was the club's 22nd season in the National Hockey League (NHL). The regular season was reduced from its usual 82 games to 48 due to the 2012–13 NHL lockout.

== Standings ==
Pacific Division
Pos	Team	GP	W	L	OTL	ROW	GF	GA	GD	Pts
1	y – Anaheim Ducks	48	30	12	6	24	140	118	+22	66
2	x – Los Angeles Kings	48	27	16	5	25	133	118	+15	59
3	x – San Jose Sharks	48	25	16	7	17	124	116	+8	57
4	Phoenix Coyotes	48	21	18	9	17	125	131	−6	51
5	Dallas Stars	48	22	22	4	20	130	142	−12	48

Source: National Hockey League
x – Clinched playoff spot; y – Clinched division

Western Conference
Pos	Div	Team	GP	W	L	OTL	ROW	GF	GA	GD	Pts
1	CE	p – Chicago Blackhawks	48	36	7	5	30	155	102	+53	77
2	PA	y – Anaheim Ducks	48	30	12	6	24	140	118	+22	66
3	NW	y – Vancouver Canucks	48	26	15	7	21	127	121	+6	59
4	CE	x – St. Louis Blues	48	29	17	2	24	129	115	+14	60
5	PA	x – Los Angeles Kings	48	27	16	5	25	133	118	+15	59
6	PA	x – San Jose Sharks	48	25	16	7	17	124	116	+8	57
7	CE	x – Detroit Red Wings	48	24	16	8	22	124	115	+9	56
8	NW	x – Minnesota Wild	48	26	19	3	22	122	127	−5	55
9	CE	Columbus Blue Jackets	48	24	17	7	19	120	119	+1	55
10	PA	Phoenix Coyotes	48	21	18	9	17	125	131	−6	51
11	PA	Dallas Stars	48	22	22	4	20	130	142	−12	48
12	NW	Edmonton Oilers	48	19	22	7	17	125	134	−9	45
13	NW	Calgary Flames	48	19	25	4	19	128	160	−32	42
14	CE	Nashville Predators	48	16	23	9	14	111	139	−28	41
15	NW	Colorado Avalanche	48	16	25	7	14	116	152	−36	39

Source: National Hockey League
p – Clinched Presidents' Trophy; x – Clinched playoff spot; y – Clinched division

== Regular season ==
=== January ===
The Sharks started the 2012–13 season with a perfect record; getting 14 out of 14 possible points in their seven January games. Patrick Marleau scored the Sharks first goal of the season, in the second period of the regular season opener against the Calgary Flames.

=== February ===
February would however be troublesome – in 12 games the Sharks would only get two wins and a total of eight points.

=== March ===
The Sharks were successful at home in March, with five wins and a loss in overtime. On the road, they had less success – registering three wins, five losses and an overtime loss. After eight seasons with the Sharks, Douglas Murray was traded to the Pittsburgh Penguins on March 25.

=== April ===
The Sharks were active around the trade deadline; Ryane Clowe, who also played with the Sharks for eight seasons, was traded to the New York Rangers, Michal Handzus was traded to the Chicago Blackhawks, Raffi Torres was acquired from the Phoenix Coyotes and Scott Hannan was acquired from the Nashville Predators. This is Hannan's second stint with San Jose.

On April 23, 2013, in the final home game of the regular season, the Sharks defeated the Stars 3–2 to clinch a playoff berth. The Sharks finished with a home record of 17–2–5 and qualified for the playoffs for the ninth consecutive season.

== Schedule and results ==
2012–13 Game Log: 25–16–7 (Home: 17–2–5; Road: 8–14–2)

January: 7–0–0 (Home: 5–0–0; Road: 2–0–0)
#	Date	Visitor	Score	Home	OT/SO	Decision	Attendance	Record	Pts	Recap
1	January 20	San Jose Sharks	4–1	Calgary Flames		Niemi	19,289	1–0–0	2	Recap
2	January 22	San Jose Sharks	6–3	Edmonton Oilers		Niemi	16,839	2–0–0	4	Recap
3	January 24	Phoenix Coyotes	3–5	San Jose Sharks		Niemi	17,562	3–0–0	6	Recap
4	January 26	Colorado Avalanche	0–4	San Jose Sharks		Greiss	17,562	4–0–0	8	Recap
5	January 27	Vancouver Canucks	1–4	San Jose Sharks		Niemi	17,562	5–0–0	10	Recap
6	January 29	Anaheim Ducks	2–3	San Jose Sharks	SO	Niemi	17,562	6–0–0	12	Recap
7	January 31	Edmonton Oilers	2–3	San Jose Sharks	SO	Niemi	17,562	7–0–0	14	Recap

February: 2–6–4 (Home: 1–1–3; Road: 1–5–1)
#	Date	Visitor	Score	Home	OT/SO	Decision	Attendance	Record	Pts	Recap
8	February 2	Nashville Predators	2–1	San Jose Sharks	SO	Niemi	17,562	7–0–1	15	Recap
9	February 4	San Jose Sharks	1–2	Anaheim Ducks		Greiss	14,324	7–1–1	15	Recap
10	February 5	Chicago Blackhawks	5–3	San Jose Sharks		Niemi	17,562	7–2–1	15	Recap
11	February 9	Phoenix Coyotes	1–0	San Jose Sharks	SO	Niemi	17,562	7–2–2	16	Recap
12	February 11	San Jose Sharks	2–6	Columbus Blue Jackets		Greiss	10,837	7–3–2	16	Recap
13	February 12	San Jose Sharks	0–1	Nashville Predators	OT	Niemi	17,113	7–3–3	17	Recap
14	February 15	San Jose Sharks	1–4	Chicago Blackhawks		Niemi	21,824	7–4–3	17	Recap
15	February 19	San Jose Sharks	2–1	St. Louis Blues		Niemi	16,100	8–4–3	19	Recap
16	February 22	San Jose Sharks	1–2	Chicago Blackhawks		Niemi	21,670	8–5–3	19	Recap
17	February 23	San Jose Sharks	1–3	Dallas Stars		Niemi	18,584	8–6–3	19	Recap
18	February 26	Colorado Avalanche	2–3	San Jose Sharks	SO	Niemi	17,562	9–6–3	21	Recap
19	February 28	Detroit Red Wings	2–1	San Jose Sharks	SO	Niemi	17,562	9–6–4	22	Recap

March: 8–5–2 (Home: 5–0–1; Road: 3–5–1)
#	Date	Visitor	Score	Home	OT/SO	Decision	Attendance	Record	Pts	Recap
20	March 2	Nashville Predators	1–2	San Jose Sharks		Niemi	17,546	10–6–4	24	Recap
21	March 5	San Jose Sharks	3–2	Vancouver Canucks	SO	Niemi	18,910	11–6–4	26	Recap
22	March 6	San Jose Sharks	1–4	Calgary Flames		Greiss	19,289	11–7–4	26	Recap
23	March 9	St. Louis Blues	4–3	San Jose Sharks	OT	Niemi	17,562	11–7–5	27	Recap
24	March 10	San Jose Sharks	2–3	Colorado Avalanche	OT	Niemi	16,040	11–7–6	28	Recap
25	March 12	San Jose Sharks	2–4	St. Louis Blues		Niemi	16,583	11–8–6	28	Recap
26	March 14	Los Angeles Kings	3–4	San Jose Sharks		Niemi	17,562	12–8–6	30	Recap
27	March 16	San Jose Sharks	2–5	Los Angeles Kings		Niemi	18,118	12–9–6	30	Recap
28	March 18	San Jose Sharks	3–5	Anaheim Ducks		Niemi	14,441	12–10–6	30	Recap
29	March 20	San Jose Sharks	4–3	Edmonton Oilers	SO	Niemi	16,839	13–10–6	32	Recap
30	March 23	San Jose Sharks	0–2	Minnesota Wild		Niemi	19,358	13–11–6	32	Recap
31	March 25	San Jose Sharks	5–3	Anaheim Ducks		Niemi	16,083	14–11–6	34	Recap
32	March 27	Anaheim Ducks	0–2	San Jose Sharks		Niemi	17,562	15–11–6	36	Recap
33	March 28	Detroit Red Wings	0–2	San Jose Sharks		Niemi	17,562	16–11–6	38	Recap
34	March 30	Phoenix Coyotes	2–3	San Jose Sharks	SO	Niemi	17,562	17–11–6	40	Recap

April: 8–5–1 (Home: 6–1–1; Road: 2–4–0)
#	Date	Visitor	Score	Home	OT/SO	Decision	Attendance	Record	Pts	Recap
35	April 1	Vancouver Canucks	2–3	San Jose Sharks		Niemi	17,562	18–11–6	42	Recap
36	April 3	Minnesota Wild	2–4	San Jose Sharks		Niemi	17,562	19–11–6	44	Recap
37	April 5	Calgary Flames	1–2	San Jose Sharks		Niemi	17,562	20–11–6	46	Recap
38	April 7	Dallas Stars	5–4	San Jose Sharks	SO	Niemi	17,562	20–11–7	47	Recap
39	April 9	San Jose Sharks	0–4	Columbus Blue Jackets		Niemi	17,771	20–12–7	47	Recap
40	April 11	San Jose Sharks	3–2	Detroit Red Wings	SO	Niemi	20,066	21–12–7	49	Recap
41	April 13	San Jose Sharks	1–2	Dallas Stars		Niemi	18,007	21–13–7	49	Recap
42	April 15	San Jose Sharks	4–0	Phoenix Coyotes		Niemi	13,094	22–13–7	51	Recap
43	April 16	Los Angeles Kings	2–3	San Jose Sharks	SO	Niemi	17,562	23–13–7	53	Recap
44	April 18	Minnesota Wild	1–6	San Jose Sharks		Niemi	17,562	24–13–7	55	Recap
45	April 21	Columbus Blue Jackets	4–3	San Jose Sharks		Niemi	17,562	24–14–7	55	Recap
46	April 23	Dallas Stars	2–3	San Jose Sharks		Niemi	17,562	25–14–7	57	Recap
47	April 24	San Jose Sharks	1–2	Phoenix Coyotes		Greiss	12,588	25–15–7	57	Recap
48	April 27	San Jose Sharks	2–3	Los Angeles Kings		Niemi	18,443	25–16–7	57	Recap

Legend: Win (2 points) Loss (0 points) Overtime/shootout loss (1 point)

== Playoffs ==
The San Jose Sharks enters the playoffs as the Western Conference's sixth seed. They swept the Vancouver Canucks in the first round, but were knocked out of the playoffs in a 4–3 series loss to the Los Angeles Kings in the second round.

2013 Stanley Cup playoffs

Western Conference Quarterfinal vs. (3) Vancouver Canucks: San Jose won series 4–0
#	Date	Visitor	Score	Home	OT	Decision	Attendance	Series	Recap
1	May 1	San Jose	3–1	Vancouver		Niemi	18,910	1–0	Recap
2	May 3	San Jose	3–2	Vancouver	OT	Niemi	18,910	2–0	Recap
3	May 5	Vancouver	2–5	San Jose		Niemi	17,562	3–0	Recap
4	May 7	Vancouver	3–4	San Jose	OT	Niemi	17,562	4–0	Recap

Western Conference Semifinal vs. (5) Los Angeles Kings: Los Angeles won series 4–3
#	Date	Visitor	Score	Home	OT	Decision	Attendance	Series	Recap
1	May 14	San Jose	0–2	Los Angeles		Niemi	18,118	0–1	Recap
2	May 16	San Jose	3–4	Los Angeles		Niemi	18,527	0–2	Recap
3	May 18	Los Angeles	1–2	San Jose	OT	Niemi	17,562	1–2	Recap
4	May 21	Los Angeles	1–2	San Jose		Niemi	17,562	2–2	Recap
5	May 23	San Jose	0–3	Los Angeles		Niemi	18,584	2–3	Recap
6	May 26	Los Angeles	1–2	San Jose		Niemi	17,562	3–3	Recap
7	May 28	San Jose	1–2	Los Angeles		Niemi	18,593	3–4	Recap

Legend: Win Loss

== Player statistics ==
Final stats

Skaters

Regular season
Player	GP	G	A	Pts	+/−	PIM
Joe Thornton	48	7	33	40	+6	26
Logan Couture	48	21	16	37	+7	4
Patrick Marleau	48	17	14	31	−2	24
Joe Pavelski	48	16	15	31	+2	10
Brent Burns	30	9	11	20	0	20
Dan Boyle	46	7	13	20	+3	27
Martin Havlat	40	8	10	18	+7	30
Scott Gomez	39	2	13	15	−10	22
TJ Galiardi	36	5	9	14	+1	14
Tommy Wingels	42	5	8	13	−9	26
Matt Irwin	38	6	6	12	−1	10
Ryane Clowe^{‡}	28	0	11	11	−4	79
Marc-Edouard Vlasic	48	3	4	7	+5	29
Justin Braun	41	0	7	7	−5	6
Raffi Torres^{†}	11	2	4	6	+1	4
Brad Stuart	48	0	6	6	+4	25
James Sheppard	32	1	3	4	−9	12
Andrew Desjardins	42	2	1	3	−6	61
Adam Burish	46	1	2	3	−7	25
Jason Demers	22	1	2	3	−4	10
Douglas Murray^{‡}	29	0	3	3	−8	26
Tim Kennedy	13	2	0	2	−3	2
Michal Handzus^{‡}	28	1	1	2	−9	12
Matt Tennyson	4	0	2	2	+2	2
Scott Hannan^{†}	4	0	0	0	−3	2
Matt Pelech	2	0	0	0	0	7
Bracken Kearns	1	0	0	0	0	0
Nick Petrecki	1	0	0	0	0	0

Playoffs
Player	GP	G	A	Pts	+/−	PIM
Joe Pavelski	11	4	8	12	0	0
Logan Couture	11	5	6	11	−6	0
Joe Thornton	11	2	8	10	+5	2
Patrick Marleau	11	5	3	8	0	2
Dan Boyle	11	3	5	8	−3	2
Brent Burns	11	2	2	4	−1	8
Scott Hannan	11	0	4	4	+1	4
Brad Stuart	11	1	2	3	+3	2
Marc-Edouard Vlasic	11	1	1	2	+2	6
TJ Galiardi	11	1	1	2	+1	6
Tommy Wingels	11	0	2	2	+1	6
Scott Gomez	9	0	2	2	0	6
Raffi Torres	5	1	0	1	−1	2
Justin Braun	11	0	1	1	−1	0
Matt Irwin	11	0	1	1	−4	4
Andrew Desjardins	11	0	0	0	+1	6
James Sheppard	11	0	0	0	−1	4
Adam Burish	6	0	0	0	0	4
Bracken Kearns	7	0	0	0	−1	2
Tim Kennedy	3	0	0	0	0	2
Martin Havlat	2	0	0	0	0	0
Jason Demers	1	0	0	0	0	2

Goaltenders

Regular season
Player	GP	GS	TOI	W	L	OT	GA	GAA	SA	SV%	SO	G	A	PIM
Antti Niemi	43	43	2580:46	24	12	6	93	2.16	1220	.924	4	0	1	2
Thomas Greiss	6	5	308:12	1	4	0	13	2.53	153	.915	1	0	0	0
Alex Stalock	2	0	41:49	0	0	1	2	2.86	13	.846	0	0	0	0

Playoffs
Player	GP	GS	TOI	W	L	GA	GAA	SA	SV%	SO	G	A	PIM
Antti Niemi	11	11	673:07	7	4	21	1.87	298	.930	0	0	1	0

^{†}Denotes player spent time with another team before joining the Sharks. Stats reflect time with the Sharks only.
^{‡}Traded mid-season
Bold/italics denotes franchise record

== Transactions ==
The Sharks have been involved in the following transactions during the 2012–13 season.

=== Trades ===
Date	Details
June 23, 2012	To Chicago Blackhawks 7th-round pick in 2012; 4th-round pick in 2013	To San Jose Sharks 4th-round pick in 2012
January 16, 2013	To New York Rangers Brandon Mashinter	To San Jose Sharks Tommy Grant; Conditional 7th-round pick in 2014 (Note: Condition satisfied)
March 25, 2013	To Pittsburgh Penguins Douglas Murray	To San Jose Sharks 2nd-round pick in 2013; Conditional 2nd-round pick in 2014 (Note: Condition satisfied)
April 1, 2013	To Chicago Blackhawks Michal Handzus	To San Jose Sharks 4th-round pick in 2013
April 2, 2013	To New York Rangers Ryane Clowe	To San Jose Sharks 2nd-round pick in 2013; 3rd-round pick in 2013; Conditional 5th-round pick in 2014 (Note: Condition satisfied)
April 3, 2013	To Nashville Predators Conditional 6th- or 7th-round pick in 2013 (Note: Pick became 6th-round pick after condition satisfied.)	To San Jose Sharks Scott Hannan
April 3, 2013	To Phoenix Coyotes 3rd-round pick in 2013	To San Jose Sharks Raffi Torres

=== Free agents signed ===
Player	Former team	Contract terms
Adam Burish	Dallas Stars	4 years, $7.2 million
Bracken Kearns	Florida Panthers	1 year, $550,000
Danny Groulx	HC Yugra	1 year, $525,000
Jon Matsumoto	Florida Panthers	1 year, $600,000
Scott Gomez	Montreal Canadiens	1 year, $700,000
Daniil Tarasov	Worcester Sharks	2 years, $1.36 million entry-level contract
Eriah Hayes	Minnesota State University	2 years, $1.31 million entry-level contract
Rylan Schwartz	Colorado College	2 years, $1.3 million entry-level contract
Troy Grosenick	Union College	1 year, $925,000 million entry-level contract
Petter Emanuelsson	Skelleftea AIK	2 years, $1.5675 million entry-level contract

=== Free agents lost ===
Player	New team	Contract terms
Torrey Mitchell	Minnesota Wild	3 years, $5.7 million
Benn Ferriero	Pittsburgh Penguins	1 year, $700,000
Daniel Winnik	Anaheim Ducks	2 years, $3.6 million
Jim Vandermeer	Vancouver Canucks	1 year, $600,000

=== Claimed via waivers ===
Player	Former team	Date claimed off waivers

=== Lost via waivers ===
Player	New team	Date claimed off waivers
Frazer McLaren	Toronto Maple Leafs	January 31, 2013

=== Lost via retirement ===
Player

=== Players' signings ===
Player	Date	Contract terms
Justin Braun	June 26, 2012	3 years, $3.75 million
Andrew Desjardins	June 26, 2012	1 year, $640,000
Brad Stuart	June 26, 2012	3 years, $10.8 million
Tommy Wingels	June 26, 2012	2 years, $1.55 million
Matt Irwin	July 2, 2012	1 year, $650,000
Alex Stalock	July 2, 2012	1 year, $687,500
Marc-Edouard Vlasic	July 11, 2012	5 years, $21 million contract extension
TJ Galiardi	July 12, 2012	1 year, $950,000
Frazer McLaren	July 12, 2012	1 year, $632,500
John McCarthy	July 12, 2012	2 years, $1.225 million
Matt Pelech	July 16, 2012	1 year, $577,500
Nick Petrecki	January 18, 2013	1 year, $650,000
James Sheppard	January 18, 2013	1 year, $825,000
Tim Kennedy	January 23, 2013	1 year, $675,000
Chris Tierney	April 2, 2013	3 years, $2.2275 million entry-level contract
Christopher Crane	April 2, 2013	2 years, $1.2 million entry-level contract
Matt Nieto	April 2, 2013	3 years, $2.0775 million entry-level contract
Matt Irwin	April 3, 2013	2 years, $2 million contract extension
Tomas Hertl	June 3, 2013	3 years, $2.775 million entry-level contract
Raffi Torres	June 20, 2013	3 years, $6 million
Andrew Desjardins	June 26, 2013	2 years, $1.5 million
James Sheppard	June 26, 2013	1 year, $830,000
Jason Demers	June 27, 2013	1 year, $1.5 million
Brodie Reid	June 27, 2013	1 year

== Draft picks ==
San Jose's picks at the 2012 NHL entry draft in Pittsburgh, Pennsylvania.

Round	#	Player	Position	Nationality	College/Junior/Club team (League)
1	17	Tomas Hertl	Center	Czech Republic	Slavia Prague (Czech Extraliga)
2	55^{[a]}	Chris Tierney	Center	Canada	London Knights (OHL)
4	109^{[b]}	Christophe Lalancette	Right wing	Canada	Acadie–Bathurst Titan (QMJHL)
5	138	Daniel O'Regan	Center	Germany	Saint Sebastian's School (USHS-MA)
6	168	Clifford Watson	Defence	United States	Sioux City Musketeers (USHL)
7	198	Joakim Ryan	Defence	United States	Cornell University (ECAC)

Draft notes

- The San Jose Sharks' second-round pick went to the Carolina Hurricanes as the result of a February 18, 2011, trade that sent Ian White to the Sharks in exchange for this pick.
- ^{a} San Jose Sharks awarded 25th pick in second-round on August 16, 2011, as compensation for not signing 2007 first-round pick Patrick White.
- The San Jose Sharks' third-round pick went to the Florida Panthers as the result of a June 25, 2011, trade that sent a 2011 second-round pick to the Sharks in exchange for a 2011 second-round pick and this pick.
- The San Jose Sharks' fourth-round pick went to the Anaheim Ducks as the result of a March 4, 2009, trade that sent Travis Moen and Kent Huskins to the Sharks in exchange for Nick Bonino, Timo Pielmeier and this pick.
- ^{b} The Chicago Blackhawks' fourth-round pick went to the San Jose Sharks as a result of a June 23, 2012, trade that sent a 2012 seventh-round pick and a 2013 fourth-round pick to the Blackhawks in exchange for this pick.

== See also ==
- 2012–13 NHL season
