= 2012–13 Anaheim Ducks season =

NHL team season

2012–13 Anaheim Ducks
- Pacific Division champions
- Division: 1st Pacific
- Conference: 2nd Western
- 2012–13 record: 30–12–6
- Home record: 16–7–1
- Road record: 14–5–5
- Goals for: 140
- Goals against: 118

Team information
- General manager: Bob Murray
- Coach: Bruce Boudreau
- Captain: Ryan Getzlaf
- Alternate captains: Saku Koivu; Teemu Selanne
- Arena: Honda Center
- Average attendance: 15,888 (92.5%); Total: 381,308

Team leaders
- Goals: Ryan Getzlaf and Corey Perry (15)
- Assists: Ryan Getzlaf (34)
- Points: Ryan Getzlaf (49)
- Penalty minutes: Corey Perry (72)
- Plus/minus: Francois Beauchemin and Sheldon Souray (+19)
- Wins: Viktor Fasth and Jonas Hiller (15)
- Goals against average: Viktor Fasth (2.18)

The 2012–13 Anaheim Ducks season was the 20th season for the National Hockey League (NHL) franchise. The season was partially cancelled due to the 2012–13 NHL lockout, which ended on January 6, 2013. The 2012–13 campaign for the Ducks commenced as a shortened, 48-game season, beginning January 19 away against the Vancouver Canucks. The shortened season featured only intra-conference games. The Ducks compensated for a disappointing season in 2011–12 in which they struggled in the first half of the season and dug a hole that was too deep to climb out of despite a second-half resurgence. The previous season marked the second time in their last three seasons that the Ducks missed the Stanley Cup playoffs.

Despite amassing a 30–12–6 regular season record, finishing second place in the Western Conference, and winning the Pacific Division for the second time in franchise history, the Ducks disappointed in the playoffs, falling to the Detroit Red Wings 4–3. The Ducks held a 3–2 series lead in the after Game 5, but lost Game 6 in overtime to Detroit before falling apart offensively in the decisive Game 7.

== Regular season ==
See the game log below for detailed game-by-game regular season information.

Prior to the lockout, the original 2012–13 Anaheim Ducks regular season schedule was released in June 2012. Their home and season opener was scheduled to take place on Friday, October 12 against San Jose, and the Ducks were to have enjoyed a four-game homestand to start the season.

On Thursday, October 4, the NHL cancelled all games scheduled through Wednesday, October 24, causing the Ducks to lose their first six games of the season. On October 19, 2012, games through November 1 were cancelled, causing the Ducks to lose three more games. Only one week later, on October 26, all November games were cancelled, and a tentative start date of December 1 was set. On November 23, 2012, all games through December 14 were axed, impacting six games on the Ducks' schedule. On December 11, 2012, all games through December 30 were eliminated. Nine days later, on December 20, 2012, further lack of negotiations during the lockout led to the cancellation of all games through January 14.

On January 6, 2013, the lockout ended after a 16-hour negotiation session in an effort to save the season. A condensed season, of a length of 48 intra-conference games, will now be played.

Under the new, lockout-shortened 48-game schedule, the Ducks opened the season by sweeping a two-game Canadian road trip, with a decisive 7–3 victory against the Vancouver Canucks on Saturday, January 19, at 7 p.m. PST, followed by a 5–4 decision against the Calgary Flames on Monday, January 21. Their home opener will now take place at Honda Center on Friday, January 25, also against the Canucks. The distinction of the Ducks' longest homestand will be split between two five-game stretches from March 18 – 25 and from April 3 to 10. Anaheim's lengthiest road trip was a six-game haul from February 6 – 16. Also, due to the shortened nature of the schedule and the objective of condensing travel, all games will be against the Ducks' own Western Conference opponents, and no games will be played against Eastern Conference teams. This condensed schedule structure also leads to the development of anomalies absent from a normal 82-game schedule, such as playing back-to-back games against the same team in the same location. For example, the Ducks host the Dallas Stars at Honda Center on both April 3 and 5, and later play games on two consecutive nights at the Edmonton Oilers on April 21 and 22. The Ducks will end the regular season on Saturday, April 27, at home against the Phoenix Coyotes.

=== Notable games ===
==== January ====
- January 19: The Ducks open the season on the road with a 7–3 triumph over hosting Vancouver. The Ducks break a six-season streak of losing the first game of the regular season; this is the first time they have done so since 2006–07.
- January 25: The Ducks hold their home opener against Vancouver, in a rematch of the season opener six days earlier; however, in a reversal of fortunes, this time the Ducks lose by a score of 5–0.

==== February ====
- February 9: Rookie goaltender Viktor Fasth improves to a perfect 5–0–0 record (making him the netminder for more than half of Anaheim's eight victories) as the Ducks defeat the faltering Blues 6–5 in a shootout thriller in St. Louis. The Ducks rally from a 3–1 deficit at the end of the first period, scoring three goals in 1 minute, 41 seconds late in the second period.
- February 12: Fasth improves to 6–0–0 and the Ducks improve to 9–2–1 and to 3–1–0 on a road swing by way of defeating the first place Chicago Blackhawks 3–2 in a shootout. Andrew Cogliano scores a game-tying goal late in the third period to help the Ducks recover from a 2–1 deficit, and Anaheim kills off two Chicago power plays in overtime, paving the way for the eventual shootout triumph.
- February 15: Anaheim defeats the Detroit Red Wings 5–2 as the Ducks grab their first regular season victory in Joe Louis Arena in five years and five days, their last regular season triumph in the Motor City being a 3–2 win on Feb 10, 2008. Viktor Fasth remains undefeated between the pipes at a record of 7–0–0.

==== March ====
- March 18: The Ducks set a franchise record with their 12th consecutive victory at home, a 5–3 triumph over San Jose. Midway through the second period, Anaheim scores twice in 34 seconds and thrice in 2 minutes 46 seconds as Long Beach native Emerson Etem scores his first NHL goal.
- March 20: In a matchup of the two top teams in the Western Conference and of two of the top teams in the NHL, the Ducks down the formidable Chicago Blackhawks 4–2 in front of the largest crowd ever for a Ducks home game at Honda Center, with a mark of 17,610. (This breaks the old record of 17,601, also set during a Ducks–Blackhawks game, on February 26, 2012.) The Ducks score three unanswered goals in the third period and twice in 64 seconds to roar back from a 2–1 deficit for the 4–2 win. The triumph hands the Blackhawks only their third regulation loss of the season and follows a 3–2 overtime road win against Chicago on Feb. 12. Anaheim also extends their home winning streak to its 13th game.
- March 29: Having fallen into a four-game losing streak since the March 20 game, the Ducks face the Blackhawks again—this time in Chicago—and end their losing streak and sweep the season series with a 2–1 triumph. Defenseman Sheldon Souray uses his trademark slapshot to score the game-winning goal with 2:08 left in the third period; the Los Angeles Times had run an article on Souray's benefits to the team that very morning.

==== April ====
- April 12: While Anaheim was idle, the Ducks clinched a berth to the 2013 Stanley Cup playoffs by virtue of a Detroit loss. This is Anaheim's ninth berth to the Stanley Cup playoffs and fifth in the past seven seasons since the 2004–05 lockout.
- April 21: The Ducks snapped a four-game losing streak in Edmonton at Rexall Place. This was Anaheim's tenth straight victory in Edmonton and the victory also mathematically eliminated the Oilers from playoff contention. The win also clinched home ice in the first round.
- April 22: With a 3–0 win over Edmonton at Rexall Place, the Ducks clinched their second ever Pacific Division title and the second seed in the Western Conference for the 2013 Stanley Cup playoffs. The win also extended Anaheim's winning streak in Edmonton to 11 games.

== Schedule and results ==
=== Regular season ===
Below is the new, truncated 2012–13 schedule for the Ducks.

2012–13 Game Log: 30–12–6
January: 3–1–1 (Home: 1–1–0; Road: 2–0–1)

#	Date	Opponent	Score	OT	Win	Loss	Attendance	Record	Arena	Box	Points
1	January 19	@ Canucks	7–3		Hiller (1–0–0)	Schneider (0–1–0)	18,910	1–0–0	Rogers Arena	W1	2
2	January 21	@ Flames	5–4		Hiller (2–0–0)	Kiprusoff (0–2–0)	19,289	2–0–0	Scotiabank Saddledome	W2	4
3	January 25	Canucks	5–0		Schneider (2–1–0)	Hiller (2–1–0)	17,529	2–1–0	Honda Center	L1	4
4	January 26	Predators	3–2	SO	Fasth (1–0–0)	Rinne (0–1–3)	17,174	3–1–0	Honda Center	W1	6
5	January 29	@ Sharks	3–2	SO	Niemi (5–0–0)	Hiller (2–1–1)	17,562	3–1–1	HP Pavilion	O1	7

February: 11–2–0 (Home: 6–0–0; Road: 5–2–0)

#	Date	Opponent	Score	OT	Win	Loss	Attendance	Record	Arena	Box	Points
6	February 1	Wild	3–1		Fasth (2–0–0)	Backstrom (3–2–1)	13,007	4–1–1	Honda Center	W1	9
7	February 2	Kings	7–4		Hiller (3–1–1)	Bernier (0–1–0)	17,436	5–1–1	Honda Center	W2	11
8	February 4	Sharks	2–1		Fasth (3–0–0)	Greiss (1–1–0)	14,324	6–1–1	Honda Center	W3	13
9	February 6	@ Avalanche	3–0		Fasth (4–0–0)	Varlamov (3–6–0)	13,776	7–1–1	Pepsi Center	W4	15
10	February 8	@ Stars	3–1		Lehtonen (6–2–1)	Hiller (3–2–1)	18,112	7–2–1	American Airlines Center	L1	15
11	February 9	@ Blues	6–5	SO	Fasth (5–0–0)	Elliott (3–4–1)	18,835	8–2–1	Scottrade Center	W1	17
12	February 12	@ Blackhawks	3–2	SO	Fasth (6–0–0)	Crawford (7–0–3)	21,188	9–2–1	United Center	W2	19
13	February 15	@ Red Wings	5–2		Fasth (7–0–0)	Howard (6–5–2)	20,066	10–2–1	Joe Louis Arena	W3	21
14	February 16	@ Predators	3–2	SO	Fasth (8–0–0)	Rinne (6–3–4)	17,322	11–2–1	Bridgestone Arena	W4	23
15	February 18	Blue Jackets	3–2		Hiller (4–2–1)	Bobrovsky (2–5–2)	14,713	12–2–1	Honda Center	W5	25
16	February 24	Avalanche	4–3	OT	Hiller (5–2–1)	Giguere (2–0–1)	17,174	13–2–1	Honda Center	W6	27
17	February 25	@ Kings	5–2		Quick (6–5–2)	Fasth (8–1–0)	18,118	13–3–1	Staples Center	L1	27
18	February 27	Predators	5–1		Fasth (9–1–0)	Rinne (8–6–4)	13,630	14–3–1	Honda Center	W1	29

March: 9–4–4 (Home: 6–3–0; Road: 3–1–4)

#	Date	Opponent	Score	OT	Win	Loss	Attendance	Record	Arena	Box	Points
19	March 1	Wild	3–2		Hiller (6–2–1)	Kuemper (1–2–0)	15,264	15–3–1	Honda Center	W2	31
20	March 2	@ Coyotes	5–4	SO	Smith (8–6–2)	Fasth (9–1–1)	15,227	15–3–2	Jobing.com Arena	O1	32
21	March 4	@ Coyotes	5–4	SO	Smith (9–6–2)	Hiller (6–2–2)	11,024	15–3–3	Jobing.com Arena	O2	33
22	March 6	Coyotes	2–0		Hiller (7–2–2)	LaBarbera (1–3–0)	13,456	16–3–3	Honda Center	W1	35
23	March 8	Flames	4–0		Fasth (10–1–1)	Kiprusoff (3–4–2)	15,839	17–3–3	Honda Center	W2	37
24	March 10	Blues	4–2		Hiller (8–2–2)	Halák (5–3–1)	17,174	18–3–3	Honda Center	W3	39
25	March 12	@ Wild	2–1		Hiller (9–2–2)	Backstrom (11–7–2)	18,808	19–3–3	Xcel Energy Center	W4	41
26	March 14	@ Stars	2–1	SO	Hiller (10–2–2)	Lehtonen (9–5–2)	15,775	20–3–3	American Airlines Center	W5	43
27	March 16	@ Blues	2–1	OT	Allen (8–1–0)	Hiller (10–2–3)	19,593	20–3–4	Scottrade Center	O1	44
28	March 18	Sharks	5–3		Fasth (11–1–1)	Niemi (11–7–5)	14,441	21–3–4	Honda Center	W1	46
29	March 20	Blackhawks	4–2		Hiller (11–2–3)	Crawford (13–3–3)	17,610	22–3–4	Honda Center	W2	48
30	March 22	Red Wings	5–1		Howard (13–8–4)	Fasth (11–2–1)	17,174	22–4–4	Honda Center	L1	48
31	March 24	Red Wings	2–1		Howard (14–8–4)	Hiller (11–3–3)	17,427	22–5–4	Honda Center	L2	48
32	March 25	Sharks	5–3		Niemi (13–8–5)	Fasth (11–3–1)	16,083	22–6–4	Honda Center	L3	48
33	March 27	@ Sharks	4–0		Niemi (14–8–5)	Hiller (11–4–3)	17,562	22–7–4	HP Pavilion	L4	48
34	March 29	@ Blackhawks	2–1		Hiller (12–4–3)	Emery (16–12–1)	22,105	23–7–4	United Center	W1	50
35	March 31	@ Blue Jackets	2–1	OT	Bobrovsky (12–8–6)	Hiller (12–4–4)	13,185	23–7–5	Nationwide Arena	O1	51

April: 7–5–1 (Home: 3–3–1; Road: 4–2–0)

#	Date	Opponent	Score	OT	Win	Loss	Attendance	Record	Arena	Box	Points
36	April 1	@ Stars	4–0		Fasth (12–3–1)	Lehtonen (12–10–2)	13,748	24–7–5	American Airlines Center	W2	53
37	April 3	Stars	5–2		Fasth (13–3–1)	Lehtonen (12–11–2)	15,165	25–7–5	Honda Center	W3	55
38	April 5	Stars	3–1		Lehtonen (13–11–2)	Fasth (13–4–1)	16,884	25–8–5	Honda Center	L1	55
39	April 7	Kings	4–3	SO	Fasth (14–4–1)	Bernier (9–2–1)	17,494	26–8–5	Honda Center	W1	57
40	April 8	Oilers	2–1		Hiller (13–4–4)	Dubnyk (12–12–6)	15,148	27–8–5	Honda Center	W2	59
41	April 10	Avalanche	4–1		Giguere (3–4–2)	Hiller (13–5–4)	14,646	27–9–5	Honda Center	L1	59
42	April 13*	@ Kings	2–1		Quick (15–12–3)	Fasth (14–5–1)	18,473	27–10–5	Staples Center	L2	59
43	April 17	Blue Jackets	3–2	OT	Bobrovsky (17–10–6)	Fasth (14–5–2)	15,074	27–10–6	Honda Center	O1	60
44	April 19	@ Flames	3–1		Kiprusoff (8–13–2)	Hiller (13–6–4)	19,289	27–11–6	Scotiabank Saddledome	L1	60
45	April 21	@ Oilers	3–1		Hiller (14–6–4)	Dubnyk (13–15–6)	16,839	28–11–6	Rexall Place	W1	62
46	April 22	@ Oilers	3–0		Fasth (15–5–2)	Khabibulin (3–6–1)	16,839	29–11–6	Rexall Place	W2	64
47	April 25	@ Canucks	3–1		Hiller (15–6–4)	Luongo (9–5–3)	18,910	30–11–6	Rogers Arena	W3	66
48	April 27	Coyotes	5–3		LaBarbera (4–6–2)	Fasth (15–6–2)	17,442	30–12–6	Honda Center	L1	66
* Anaheim clinched a playoff berth on April 12, 2013, by virtue of a Detroit loss.

Final games legend
Ducks Win (2 pts.)	Ducks Loss (0 pts.)	OT Loss (1 pt.)	Clinched Playoffs	Clinched Division

"Points" legend
1st (Pacific Division)	Not in Playoff Position	In Playoff Position

=== Post-season ===
2013 Postseason Game Log
Western Conference Quarterfinals vs. (7) Detroit Red Wings: Detroit won series 4–3

#	Date	Opponent	Score	OT	Win	Loss	Attendance	Series	Arena	Box
1	April 30	Red Wings	3–1		Hiller (1–0)	Howard (0–1)	17,200	1–0	Honda Center	W1
2	May 2	Red Wings	5–4	OT	Howard (1–1)	Hiller (1–1)	17,182	1–1	Honda Center	L1
3	May 4	@ Red Wings	4–0		Hiller (2–1)	Howard (1–2)	20,066	2–1	Joe Louis Arena	W1
4	May 6	@ Red Wings	3–2	OT	Howard (2–2)	Hiller (2–2)	20,066	2–2	Joe Louis Arena	L1
5	May 8	Red Wings	3–2	OT	Hiller (3–2)	Howard (2–3)	17,395	3–2	Honda Center	W1
6	May 10	@ Red Wings	4–3	OT	Howard (3–3)	Hiller (3–3)	20,066	3–3	Joe Louis Arena	L1
7	May 12	Red Wings	3–2		Howard (4–3)	Hiller (3–4)	17,412	3–4	Honda Center	L2

Legend
Ducks Win	Ducks Loss

Future Games Legend
Home Game	Away Game

== Standings ==
Pacific Division
Pos	Team	GP	W	L	OTL	ROW	GF	GA	GD	Pts
1	y – Anaheim Ducks	48	30	12	6	24	140	118	+22	66
2	x – Los Angeles Kings	48	27	16	5	25	133	118	+15	59
3	x – San Jose Sharks	48	25	16	7	17	124	116	+8	57
4	Phoenix Coyotes	48	21	18	9	17	125	131	−6	51
5	Dallas Stars	48	22	22	4	20	130	142	−12	48

Source: National Hockey League
x – Clinched playoff spot; y – Clinched division

Western Conference
Pos	Div	Team	GP	W	L	OTL	ROW	GF	GA	GD	Pts
1	CE	p – Chicago Blackhawks	48	36	7	5	30	155	102	+53	77
2	PA	y – Anaheim Ducks	48	30	12	6	24	140	118	+22	66
3	NW	y – Vancouver Canucks	48	26	15	7	21	127	121	+6	59
4	CE	x – St. Louis Blues	48	29	17	2	24	129	115	+14	60
5	PA	x – Los Angeles Kings	48	27	16	5	25	133	118	+15	59
6	PA	x – San Jose Sharks	48	25	16	7	17	124	116	+8	57
7	CE	x – Detroit Red Wings	48	24	16	8	22	124	115	+9	56
8	NW	x – Minnesota Wild	48	26	19	3	22	122	127	−5	55
9	CE	Columbus Blue Jackets	48	24	17	7	19	120	119	+1	55
10	PA	Phoenix Coyotes	48	21	18	9	17	125	131	−6	51
11	PA	Dallas Stars	48	22	22	4	20	130	142	−12	48
12	NW	Edmonton Oilers	48	19	22	7	17	125	134	−9	45
13	NW	Calgary Flames	48	19	25	4	19	128	160	−32	42
14	CE	Nashville Predators	48	16	23	9	14	111	139	−28	41
15	NW	Colorado Avalanche	48	16	25	7	14	116	152	−36	39

Source: National Hockey League
p – Clinched Presidents' Trophy; x – Clinched playoff spot; y – Clinched division

== Player statistics ==
=== Skaters ===
Note: GP = Games played; G = Goals; A = Assists; Pts = Points; +/− = Plus/minus; PIM = Penalty minutes

Regular season

Player	GP	G	A	Pts	+/−	PIM
Ryan Getzlaf	44	15	34	49	14	41
Corey Perry	44	15	21	36	10	72
Bobby Ryan	46	11	19	30	3	17
Saku Koivu	47	8	19	27	4	18
Teemu Selanne	46	12	12	24	−10	28
Francois Beauchemin	48	6	18	24	19	22
Andrew Cogliano	48	13	10	23	14	6
Kyle Palmieri	42	10	11	21	2	9
Daniel Winnik	48	6	13	19	13	16
Sheldon Souray	44	7	10	17	19	52
Matt Beleskey	42	8	5	13	2	56
Nick Bonino	27	5	8	13	−3	8
Cam Fowler	37	1	10	11	−4	4
Ben Lovejoy^{†}	32	0	10	10	6	29
Emerson Etem	38	3	7	10	7	9
Luca Sbisa	41	1	7	8	0	23
Toni Lydman	35	0	6	6	−1	12
Bryan Allen	41	0	6	6	1	34
Dave Steckel^{†}	21	1	5	6	2	4
Peter Holland	21	3	2	5	4	4
Radek Dvorak	9	4	0	4	2	2
Patrick Maroon	13	2	1	3	−1	10
Brad Staubitz	15	1	1	2	0	41
Sami Vatanen	8	2	0	2	3	0
Matthew Lombardi^{†}	7	0	0	0	−2	4
Jordan Hendry	2	0	0	0	0	0
Devante Smith-Pelly	7	0	0	0	−4	0
Rickard Rakell	4	0	0	0	−2	0

Playoffs

Player	GP	G	A	Pts	+/−	PIM
Francois Beauchemin	7	2	4	6	−2	4
Ryan Getzlaf	7	3	3	6	2	6
Kyle Palmieri	7	3	2	5	5	4
Emerson Etem	7	3	2	5	4	2
Bobby Ryan	7	2	2	4	1	0
Nick Bonino	7	3	1	4	2	4
Teemu Selanne	7	1	2	3	1	6
Saku Koivu	7	1	2	3	−4	6
Matt Beleskey	7	2	1	3	1	2
Cam Fowler	7	0	3	3	3	0
Dave Steckel	7	1	1	2	1	0
Corey Perry	7	0	2	2	0	4
Ben Lovejoy	7	0	2	2	4	0
Sheldon Souray	6	0	1	1	−2	4
Bryan Allen	7	0	1	1	1	2
Daniel Winnik	7	0	1	1	−4	7
Andrew Cogliano	7	0	1	1	−3	4
Toni Lydman	3	0	0	0	1	0
Luca Sbisa	5	0	0	0	−2	4

=== Goaltenders ===
Note: GP = Games played; GS = Games Started; TOI = Time on ice (minutes); W = Wins; L = Losses; OT = Overtime losses; GA = Goals against; GAA= Goals against average; SA= Shots against; SV= Saves; Sv% = Save percentage; SO= Shutouts

Regular season

Player	GP	GS	TOI	W	L	OT	GA	GAA	SA	Sv%	SO	G	A	PIM
Jonas Hiller	26	25	1498:19	15	6	4	59	2.36	675	.913	1	0	1	2
Viktor Fasth	25	23	1428:18	15	6	2	52	2.18	661	.921	4	0	0	0

Playoffs

Player	GP	GS	TOI	W	L	GA	GAA	SA	Sv%	SO	G	A	PIM
Jonas Hiller	7	7	438:40	3	4	18	2.46	218	.917	1	0	1	0

^{†}Denotes player spent time with another team before joining Ducks. Stats reflect time with Ducks only.
^{‡}Traded mid-season.
Bold/italics denotes franchise record

== Transactions ==
The Ducks have been involved in the following transactions during the 2012–13 season.

=== Trades ===
Date	Details
June 22, 2012	To New York Islanders Lubomir Visnovsky	To Anaheim Ducks 2nd-round pick in 2013
February 6, 2013	To Pittsburgh Penguins 5th-round pick in 2014	To Anaheim Ducks Ben Lovejoy
March 11, 2013	To Tampa Bay Lightning Dan Sexton	To Anaheim Ducks Kyle Wilson
March 15, 2013	To Toronto Maple Leafs Ryan Lasch; 7th-round pick in 2014	To Anaheim Ducks Dave Steckel
April 1, 2013	To Philadelphia Flyers Jay Rosehill	To Anaheim Ducks Harry Zolnierczyk
April 3, 2013	To Minnesota Wild Jeff Deslauriers	To Anaheim Ducks Future considerations
April 3, 2013	To Phoenix Coyotes Brandon McMillan	To Anaheim Ducks Matthew Lombardi
June 24, 2013	To Pittsburgh Penguins Harry Zolnierczyk	To Anaheim Ducks Alex Grant

=== Free agents signed ===
Player	Former team	Contract terms
Sheldon Souray	Dallas Stars	3 years, $11 million
Jordan Hendry	HC Lugano	1 year, $600,000
Brad Staubitz	Montreal Canadiens	2 years, $1.275 million
Bryan Allen	Carolina Hurricanes	3 years, $10.5 million
Corey Elkins	HC Pardubice	1 year, $700,000
Daniel Winnik	San Jose Sharks	2 years, $3.6 million
Pierre-Luc Letourneau-Leblond	Calgary Flames	1 year, $550,000
Ryan Parent	Chicago Wolves	1 year, $600,000
Jay Rosehill	Toronto Maple Leafs	1 year, $550,000
Charlie Sarault	Sarnia Sting	3 years, $2.42 million entry-level contract
Kevin Gagne	Saint John Sea Dogs	3 years, $2.3025 million entry-level contract
Radek Dvorak	Dallas Stars	1 year, $675,000
Steven Whitney	Boston College	2 years, $1.435 million entry-level contract
John Kurtz	Norfolk Admirals	1 year, $570,000
Antoine Laganiere	Yale University	2 years, $1.775 million entry-level contract

=== Free agents lost ===
Player	New team	Contract terms
George Parros	Florida Panthers	2 years, $1.85 million
Sheldon Brookbank	Chicago Blackhawks	2 years, $2.5 million
Jean-Francois Jacques	Florida Panthers	1 year, $750,000
Dan Ellis	Carolina Hurricanes	1 year, $650,000

=== Claimed via waivers ===
Player	Former team	Date claimed off waivers

=== Lost via waivers ===
Player	New team	Date claimed off waivers

=== Players signings ===
Player	Date	Contract terms
Max Friberg	June 15, 2012	3 years, $2.33 million entry-level contract
Rickard Rakell	July 2, 2012	3 years, $2.775 million entry-level contract
Matt Smaby	July 2, 2012	1 year, $650,000
Frederik Andersen	July 11, 2012	2 years, $1.85 million entry-level contract
Teemu Selanne	July 12, 2012	1 year, $4.5 million
Nick Bonino	July 13, 2012	2 years, $1.4 million
Hampus Lindholm	July 13, 2012	3 years, $2.775 million entry-level contract
Marco Cousineau	July 16, 2012	1 year, $660,000
Cam Fowler	September 17, 2012	5 years, $20 million contract extension
Troy Bodie	January 17, 2013	1 year, $550,000
Viktor Fasth	February 20, 2013	2 years, $5.8 million contract extension
Joseph Cramarossa	March 2, 2013	3 years, $2.2575 million entry-level contract
Ryan Getzlaf	March 8, 2013	8 years, $66 million contract extension
Corey Perry	March 18, 2013	8 years, $69 million contract extension
Patrick Maroon	March 21, 2013	2 years, $1.15 million contract extension
Andrew O'Brien	April 5, 2013	3 years, $1.855 million entry-level contract
William Karlsson	May 20, 2013	3 years, $2.4925 million entry-level contract
Ben Lovejoy	June 27, 2013	3 years, $3.3 million contract extension

== Draft picks ==
Anaheim Ducks' picks at the 2012 NHL entry draft, held in Pittsburgh, Pennsylvania on June 22 and 23, 2012.

Round	#	Player	Pos	Nationality	College/Junior/Club team (League)
1	6	Hampus Lindholm	D	Sweden	Rogle BK (Allsvenskan)
2	36	Nic Kerdiles	LW	USA	U.S. National Team Development Program (USHL)
3	87^{[a]}	Frederik Andersen	G	Denmark	Frolunda HC (Elitserien)
4	97	Kevin Roy	C	Canada	Lincoln Stars (USHL)
4	108	Andrew O'Brien	D	Canada	Chicoutimi Sagueneens (QMJHL)
5	127^{[b]}	Brian Cooper	D	USA	Fargo Force (USHL)
7	187	Kenton Helgesen	D	Canada	Calgary Hitmen (WHL)
7	210^{[c]}	Jaycob Megna	D	USA	University of Nebraska Omaha (WCHA)

Draft notes

- The Ducks' third-round pick went to the St. Louis Blues as the result of a February 28, 2011, trade that sent Brad Winchester to the Ducks in exchange for this pick.
- ^{a} The Vancouver Canucks' third-round pick went to the Anaheim Ducks as a result of a February 28, 2011, trade that sent Maxim Lapierre and MacGregor Sharp to the Canucks in exchange for Joel Perrault and this pick.
- ^{b} The Ducks' fifth-round pick went to the Montreal Canadiens as the result of a December 31, 2010 trade that sent Maxim Lapierre to the Ducks in exchange for Brett Festerling and this pick. The Montreal Canadiens' fifth-round pick went to the Anaheim Ducks as a result of a February 17, 2011, trade that sent Paul Mara to the Canadiens in exchange for this pick.
- The Ducks' sixth-round pick went to the Toronto Maple Leafs as the result of a June 25, 2011, trade that sent 2011 sixth-round pick to the Ducks in exchange for this pick.
- ^{c} The New Jersey Devils' seventh-round pick went to the Anaheim Ducks as a result of a December 12, 2011, trade that sent Kurtis Foster and Timo Pielmeier to the Devils in exchange for Rod Pelley, Mark Fraser and this pick.

== See also ==
- Anaheim Ducks
- Honda Center
- 2012–13 NHL season

=== Other Anaheim–based teams in 2012–13 ===
- Los Angeles Angels of Anaheim (Angel Stadium of Anaheim)
  - 2012 Los Angeles Angels of Anaheim season
  - 2013 Los Angeles Angels of Anaheim season
