= 2012–13 Phoenix Coyotes season =

NHL hockey team season

2012–13 Phoenix Coyotes
- Division: 4th Pacific
- Conference: 10th Western
- 2012–13 record: 21–18–9
- Home record: 14–8–2
- Road record: 7–10–7
- Goals for: 125
- Goals against: 131

Team information
- General manager: Don Maloney
- Coach: Dave Tippett
- Captain: Shane Doan
- Alternate captains: Martin Hanzal; Keith Yandle
- Arena: Jobing.com Arena
- Average attendance: 13,923 (81%) (24 games)

Team leaders
- Goals: Shane Doan (13); Antoine Vermette
- Assists: Oliver Ekman-Larsson (21)
- Points: Keith Yandle (30)
- Penalty minutes: Kyle Chipchura (43)
- Plus/minus: David Schlemko (+8)
- Wins: Mike Smith (15)
- Goals against average: Mike Smith (2.58)

The 2012–13 Phoenix Coyotes season was the franchise's 34th season in the National Hockey League (NHL), the 17th in Arizona, and 41st overall, including its play in the World Hockey Association. The regular season was reduced from its usual 82 games to 48 due to the 2012–13 NHL lockout.

== Regular season ==
The Coyotes concluded the regular season having been shut-out nine times, tied with the Nashville Predators for the most in the NHL.

=== Standings ===
Pacific Division
Pos	Team	GP	W	L	OTL	ROW	GF	GA	GD	Pts
1	y – Anaheim Ducks	48	30	12	6	24	140	118	+22	66
2	x – Los Angeles Kings	48	27	16	5	25	133	118	+15	59
3	x – San Jose Sharks	48	25	16	7	17	124	116	+8	57
4	Phoenix Coyotes	48	21	18	9	17	125	131	−6	51
5	Dallas Stars	48	22	22	4	20	130	142	−12	48

Source: National Hockey League
x – Clinched playoff spot; y – Clinched division

Western Conference
Pos	Div	Team	GP	W	L	OTL	ROW	GF	GA	GD	Pts
1	CE	p – Chicago Blackhawks	48	36	7	5	30	155	102	+53	77
2	PA	y – Anaheim Ducks	48	30	12	6	24	140	118	+22	66
3	NW	y – Vancouver Canucks	48	26	15	7	21	127	121	+6	59
4	CE	x – St. Louis Blues	48	29	17	2	24	129	115	+14	60
5	PA	x – Los Angeles Kings	48	27	16	5	25	133	118	+15	59
6	PA	x – San Jose Sharks	48	25	16	7	17	124	116	+8	57
7	CE	x – Detroit Red Wings	48	24	16	8	22	124	115	+9	56
8	NW	x – Minnesota Wild	48	26	19	3	22	122	127	−5	55
9	CE	Columbus Blue Jackets	48	24	17	7	19	120	119	+1	55
10	PA	Phoenix Coyotes	48	21	18	9	17	125	131	−6	51
11	PA	Dallas Stars	48	22	22	4	20	130	142	−12	48
12	NW	Edmonton Oilers	48	19	22	7	17	125	134	−9	45
13	NW	Calgary Flames	48	19	25	4	19	128	160	−32	42
14	CE	Nashville Predators	48	16	23	9	14	111	139	−28	41
15	NW	Colorado Avalanche	48	16	25	7	14	116	152	−36	39

Source: National Hockey League
p – Clinched Presidents' Trophy; x – Clinched playoff spot; y – Clinched division

== Schedule and results ==
2012–13 Game Log

January: 2–4–1 (Home: 2–2–1; Road: 0–2–0)
#	Date	Visitor	Score	Home	OT	Decision	Attendance	Record	Pts	Recap
1	January 19	Phoenix Coyotes	3–4	Dallas Stars	–	Smith	18,532	0–1–0	0	Recap
2	January 20	Chicago Blackhawks	6–4	Phoenix Coyotes	–	Smith	17,363	0–2–0	0	Recap
3	January 23	Columbus Blue Jackets	1–5	Phoenix Coyotes	–	LaBarbera	8,355	1–2–0	2	Recap
4	January 24	Phoenix Coyotes	3–5	San Jose Sharks	–	LaBarbera	17,562	1–3–0	2	Recap
5	January 26	Los Angeles Kings	4–2	Phoenix Coyotes	–	LaBarbera	14,780	1–4–0	2	Recap
6	January 28	Nashville Predators	0–4	Phoenix Coyotes	–	Johnson	8,581	2–4–0	4	Recap
7	January 30	Edmonton Oilers	2–1	Phoenix Coyotes	OT	Johnson	12,955	2–4–1	5	Recap

February: 7–4–2 (Home: 4–2–0; Road: 3–2–2)
#	Date	Visitor	Score	Home	OT	Decision	Attendance	Record	Pts	Recap
8	February 1	Phoenix Coyotes	3–4	Dallas Stars	SO	Smith	18,101	2–4–2	6	Recap
9	February 2	Dallas Stars	0–2	Phoenix Coyotes	–	Smith	12,151	3–4–2	8	Recap
10	February 4	Minnesota Wild	1–2	Phoenix Coyotes	–	Smith	9,508	4–4–2	10	Recap
11	February 7	Chicago Blackhawks	6–2	Phoenix Coyotes	–	Smith	15,096	4–5–2	10	Recap
12	February 9	Phoenix Coyotes	1–0	San Jose Sharks	SO	Smith	17,562	5–5–2	12	Recap
13	February 11	Phoenix Coyotes	3–2	Colorado Avalanche	OT	Smith	14,063	6–5–2	14	Recap
14	February 14	Phoenix Coyotes	0–3	Nashville Predators	–	Smith	17,113	6–6–2	14	Recap
15	February 16	Columbus Blue Jackets	3–5	Phoenix Coyotes	–	Smith	15,425	7–6–2	16	Recap
16	February 18	Calgary Flames	0–4	Phoenix Coyotes	–	Smith	17,208	8–6–2	18	Recap
17	February 23	Phoenix Coyotes	2–3	Edmonton Oilers	SO	Smith	16,839	8–6–3	19	Recap
18	February 24	Phoenix Coyotes	4–5	Calgary Flames	–	Smith	19,289	8–7–3	19	Recap
19	February 26	Phoenix Coyotes	4–2	Vancouver Canucks	–	Smith	18,910	9–7–3	21	Recap
20	February 28	Minnesota Wild	4–3	Phoenix Coyotes	–	Smith	11,547	9–8–3	21	Recap

March: 5–7–3 (Home: 4–3–0; Road: 1–4–3)
#	Date	Visitor	Score	Home	OT	Decision	Attendance	Record	Pts	Recap
21	March 2	Anaheim Ducks	4–5	Phoenix Coyotes	SO	Smith	15,227	10–8–3	23	Recap
22	March 4	Anaheim Ducks	4–5	Phoenix Coyotes	SO	Smith	11,024	11–8–3	25	Recap
23	March 6	Phoenix Coyotes	0–2	Anaheim Ducks	–	LaBarbera	13,456	11–9–3	25	Recap
24	March 7	St. Louis Blues	6–3	Phoenix Coyotes	–	Smith	11,482	11–10–3	25	Recap
25	March 9	Dallas Stars	1–2	Phoenix Coyotes	–	Smith	15,842	12–10–3	27	Recap
26	March 12	Los Angeles Kings	2–5	Phoenix Coyotes	–	Smith	15,075	13–10–3	29	Recap
27	March 14	Phoenix Coyotes	0–3	St. Louis Blues	–	Smith	17,852	13–11–3	29	Recap
28	March 16	Phoenix Coyotes	0–1	Columbus Blue Jackets	SO	Smith	14,231	13–11–4	30	Recap
29	March 18	Phoenix Coyotes	0–4	Los Angeles Kings	–	Smith	18,118	13–12–4	30	Recap
30	March 19	Phoenix Coyotes	2–3	Los Angeles Kings	–	Smith	18,118	13–13–4	30	Recap
31	March 21	Vancouver Canucks	2–1	Phoenix Coyotes	–	LaBarbera	17,220	13–14–4	30	Recap
32	March 25	Detroit Red Wings	3–2	Phoenix Coyotes	–	LaBarbera	17,428	13–15–4	30	Recap
33	March 27	Phoenix Coyotes	3–4	Minnesota Wild	OT	LaBarbera	19,076	13–15–5	31	Recap
34	March 28	Phoenix Coyotes	7–4	Nashville Predators	–	LaBarbera	17,113	14–15–5	33	Recap
35	March 30	Phoenix Coyotes	2–3	San Jose Sharks	SO	LaBarbera	17,562	14–15–6	34	Recap

April: 7–3–3 (Home: 4–1–1; Road: 3–2–2)
#	Date	Visitor	Score	Home	OT	Decision	Attendance	Record	Pts	Recap
36	April 2	Los Angeles Kings	1–3	Phoenix Coyotes	–	LaBarbera	12,934	15–15–6	36	Recap
37	April 4	Detroit Red Wings	2–4	Phoenix Coyotes	–	Johnson	16,623	16–15–6	38	Recap
38	April 6	Colorado Avalanche	0–4	Phoenix Coyotes	–	Smith	16,648	17–15–6	40	Recap
39	April 8	Phoenix Coyotes	0–2	Vancouver Canucks	–	Smith	18,910	17–16–6	40	Recap
40	April 10	Phoenix Coyotes	3–1	Edmonton Oilers	–	Smith	16,839	18–16–6	42	Recap
41	April 12	Phoenix Coyotes	2–3	Calgary Flames	OT	Smith	19,289	18–16–7	43	Recap
42	April 15	San Jose Sharks	4–0	Phoenix Coyotes	–	LaBarbera	13,094	18–17–7	43	Recap
43	April 18	Phoenix Coyotes	1–2	St. Louis Blues	SO	Johnson	17,205	18–17–8	44	Recap
44	April 20	Phoenix Coyotes	3–2	Chicago Blackhawks	SO	Smith	22,272	19–17–8	46	Recap
45	April 22	Phoenix Coyotes	0–4	Detroit Red Wings	–	Smith	20,066	19–18–8	46	Recap
46	April 24	San Jose Sharks	1–2	Phoenix Coyotes	–	Smith	12,588	20–18–8	48	Recap
47	April 26	Colorado Avalanche	5–4	Phoenix Coyotes	SO	Smith	16,011	20–18–9	49	Recap
48	April 27	Phoenix Coyotes	5–3	Anaheim Ducks	–	LaBarbera	17,442	21–18–9	51	Recap

Legend: = Win = Loss = OT/SO Loss

== Playoffs ==
For the first time since the 2008–09 season, the Coyotes failed to make the playoffs.

== Player statistics ==
Final stats

Skaters

Regular season
Player	GP	G	A	Pts	+/-	PIM
Keith Yandle	48	10	20	30	4	54
Radim Vrbata	34	12	16	28	6	14
Shane Doan	48	13	14	27	6	37
Mikkel Boedker	48	7	19	26	0	12
Oliver Ekman-Larsson	48	3	21	24	5	26
Martin Hanzal	39	11	12	23	2	24
Antoine Vermette	48	13	8	21	−3	36
David Moss	45	5	15	20	3	21
Boyd Gordon	48	4	10	14	0	8
Kyle Chipchura	46	5	9	14	1	50
Steve Sullivan^{‡}	33	5	7	12	−8	20
Raffi Torres^{‡}	28	5	7	12	−1	13
Derek Morris	39	0	11	11	−6	36
Lauri Korpikoski	36	6	5	11	−3	12
Rob Klinkhammer	22	5	6	11	7	10
Michael Stone	40	5	4	9	2	16
Rostislav Klesla	38	2	6	8	0	22
Matthew Lombardi^{‡}	21	4	4	8	0	4
Paul Bissonnette	28	0	6	6	2	36
Nick Johnson	17	4	2	6	3	0
David Schlemko	30	1	5	6	8	12
Zbynek Michalek	34	0	2	2	4	14
Chris Conner	12	1	1	2	3	2
David Rundblad	8	0	1	1	−5	0
Alexandre Bolduc	14	0	0	0	−4	2
Chris Summers	6	0	0	0	−3	9
Chris Brown	5	0	0	0	0	2
Andy Miele	1	0	0	0	1	0
Total		121	211	332	24	492

Goaltenders

Regular season
Player	GP	GS	TOI	W	L	OT	GA	GAA	SA	SV%	SO	G	A	PIM
Mike Smith	34	34	1955:33	15	12	5	84	2.58	938	0.910	5	0	0	0
Jason LaBarbera	15	10	725:55	4	6	2	32	2.64	418	0.923	0	0	0	0
Chad Johnson	4	4	246:37	2	0	2	5	1.21	108	0.954	1	0	0	0
Totals		48	2928:05	21	18	9	121	2.48	1464	0.917	6	0	0	0

^{†}Denotes player spent time with another team before joining the Coyotes. Stats reflect time with the Coyotes only.
^{‡}Traded mid-season
Bold/italics denotes franchise record

== Transactions ==
The Coyotes have been involved in the following transactions during the 2012–13 season.

=== Trades ===
June 22, 2012	To Pittsburgh Penguins Harrison Ruopp; Marc Cheverie; 3rd-round pick in 2012	To Phoenix Coyotes Zbynek Michalek
January 16, 2013	To Toronto Maple Leafs Conditional 4th-round pick in 2014 (Note: Condition satisfied)	To Phoenix Coyotes Matthew Lombardi
March 29, 2013	To Edmonton Oilers Kale Kessy	To Phoenix Coyotes Tobias Rieder
April 2, 2013	To Washington Capitals Joel Rechlicz	To Phoenix Coyotes Matt Clackson
April 3, 2013	To New Jersey Devils Steve Sullivan	To Phoenix Coyotes 7th-round pick in 2014
April 3, 2013	To San Jose Sharks Raffi Torres	To Phoenix Coyotes 3rd-round pick in 2013
April 3, 2013	To Anaheim Ducks Matthew Lombardi	To Phoenix Coyotes Brandon McMillan

=== Free agents acquired ===
Player	Former team	Contract terms
David Moss	Calgary Flames	2 years, $4.2 million
Chad Johnson	Connecticut Whale	1 year, $600,000
Chris Conner	Detroit Red Wings	1 year, $650,000
Rob Klinkhammer	Ottawa Senators	1 year, $650,000
Steve Sullivan	Pittsburgh Penguins	1 year, $1.85 million
Joel Rechlicz	Washington Capitals	1 year, $550,000
Nick Johnson	Minnesota Wild	1 year, $725,000
Mathieu Brisebois	Rouyn-Noranda Huskies	3 years, $1.965 million entry-level contract

=== Free agents lost ===
Player	New team	Contract terms
Adrian Aucoin	Columbus Blue Jackets	1 year, $2 million
Ray Whitney	Dallas Stars	2 years, $9 million
Taylor Pyatt	New York Rangers	2 years, $3.1 million
Matt Watkins	New York Islanders	1 year, $700,000
Michal Rozsival	Chicago Blackhawks	1 year, $2 million

=== Player signings ===
Player	Date	Contract terms
Andy Miele	June 29, 2012	1 year, $850,500
Alexandre Bolduc	July 2, 2012	1 year, $650,000
Kyle Chipchura	July 5, 2012	1 year, $675,000
Chris Summers	July 18, 2012	1 year, $803,250
Jordan Martinook	September 3, 2012	3 years, $1.95 million entry-level contract
Lucas Lessio	September 4, 2012	3 years, $2.585 million entry-level contract
Shane Doan	September 14, 2012	4 years, $21.2 million
David Schlemko	February 25, 2013	2 years, $2.375 million contract extension
Darian Dziurzynski	March 11, 2013	2 years, $1.28 million entry-level contract
Henrik Samuelsson	March 11, 2013	3 years, $2.775 million entry-level contract
Oliver Ekman-Larsson	March 15, 2013	6 years, $33 million contract extension
Tobias Rieder	April 15, 2013	3 years, $2.56 million entry-level contract
Rob Klinkhammer	May 16, 2013	2 years, $1.25 million contract extension
James Melindy	May 29, 2013	3 years, $1.925 million entry-level contract

== Draft picks ==
Phoenix Coyotes' picks at the 2012 NHL entry draft, held in Pittsburgh, Pennsylvania on June 22 & 23, 2012.

Round	#	Player	Pos	Nationality	College/Junior/Club team (League)
1	27	Henrik Samuelsson	C	United States	Edmonton Oil Kings (WHL)
2	58	Jordan Martinook	LW	Canada	Vancouver Giants (WHL)
3	88	James Melindy	D	Canada	Moncton Wildcats (QMJHL)
4	102^{[a]}	Rhett Holland	D	Canada	Okotoks Oilers (AJHL)
5	148	Niklas Tikkinen	D	Finland	Blues U20 (Jr. A SM-liiga)
6	178	Samuel Fejes	LW	United States	Shattuck-Saint Mary's (Midget AAA)
7	184^{[b]}	Marek Langhamer	G	Czech Republic	HC Pardubice (Noen ELJ)
7	208	Justin Hache	D	Canada	Shawinigan Cataractes (QMJHL)

Draft notes

- ^{a} The Colorado Avalanche's fourth-round pick went to the Phoenix Coyotes as a result of a June 28, 2010, trade that sent Daniel Winnik to the Avalanche in exchange for this pick.
- The Phoenix Coyotes' fourth-round pick went to the Nashville Predators as the result of an October 28, 2011, trade that sent Cal O'Reilly to the Coyotes in exchange for this pick.
- ^{b} The Montreal Canadiens' seventh-round pick went to the Phoenix Coyotes as a result of an October 23, 2011, trade that sent Petteri Nokelainen and Garrett Stafford to the Canadiens in exchange for Brock Trotter and this pick.

== See also ==
- 2012–13 NHL season
