= 2012–13 Minnesota Wild season =

National Hockey League team season

2012–13 Minnesota Wild
- Division: 2nd Northwest
- Conference: 8th Western
- 2012–13 record: 26–19–3
- Home record: 14–8–2
- Road record: 12–11–1

Team information
- General manager: Chuck Fletcher
- Coach: Mike Yeo
- Captain: Mikko Koivu
- Alternate captains: Zach Parise; Ryan Suter
- Arena: Xcel Energy Center
- Average attendance: 18,794 (104.7%) (24 games)

Team leaders
- Goals: Zach Parise (18)
- Assists: Ryan Suter (28)
- Points: Zach Parise (38)
- Penalty minutes: Zenon Konopka (117)
- Plus/minus: Matt Cullen (+9)
- Wins: Nicklas Backstrom (24)
- Goals against average: Darcy Kuemper (2.08)

The 2012–13 Minnesota Wild season was the 13th season for the National Hockey League (NHL) franchise that was established on June 25, 1997. The regular season was reduced from its usual 82 games to 48 due to the 2012–13 NHL lockout.

The Wild made the Stanley Cup playoffs for the first time since the 2007–08 season, where they fell to the Chicago Blackhawks in the first round.

== Off-season ==
The Wild made a splash in the free-agent pool by signing top free agents Zach Parise and Ryan Suter on July 4, 2012. Both were signed to 13-year-long contracts.

== Regular season ==
On February 26, 2013, Zach Parise scored just 27 seconds into the overtime period to give the Wild a 2–1 home win over the Calgary Flames. Parise tied Marian Gaborik's mark, set on January 23, 2013, when he scored 27 seconds into the overtime period to give the Rangers a 4–3 home win over the Boston Bruins. Both goals would prove to be the fastest overtime goals scored during the lockout-shortened season.

The Wild were the most disciplined team during the regular season, with a league-low 135 power-play opportunities against. They also tied the New York Islanders for the fewest shorthanded goals allowed, with zero.

=== Standings ===
Northwest Division
Pos	Team	GP	W	L	OTL	ROW	GF	GA	GD	Pts
1	y – Vancouver Canucks	48	26	15	7	21	127	121	+6	59
2	x – Minnesota Wild	48	26	19	3	22	122	127	−5	55
3	Edmonton Oilers	48	19	22	7	17	125	134	−9	45
4	Calgary Flames	48	19	25	4	19	128	160	−32	42
5	Colorado Avalanche	48	16	25	7	14	116	152	−36	39

Source: National Hockey League
x – Clinched playoff spot; y – Clinched division

Western Conference
Pos	Div	Team	GP	W	L	OTL	ROW	GF	GA	GD	Pts
1	CE	p – Chicago Blackhawks	48	36	7	5	30	155	102	+53	77
2	PA	y – Anaheim Ducks	48	30	12	6	24	140	118	+22	66
3	NW	y – Vancouver Canucks	48	26	15	7	21	127	121	+6	59
4	CE	x – St. Louis Blues	48	29	17	2	24	129	115	+14	60
5	PA	x – Los Angeles Kings	48	27	16	5	25	133	118	+15	59
6	PA	x – San Jose Sharks	48	25	16	7	17	124	116	+8	57
7	CE	x – Detroit Red Wings	48	24	16	8	22	124	115	+9	56
8	NW	x – Minnesota Wild	48	26	19	3	22	122	127	−5	55
9	CE	Columbus Blue Jackets	48	24	17	7	19	120	119	+1	55
10	PA	Phoenix Coyotes	48	21	18	9	17	125	131	−6	51
11	PA	Dallas Stars	48	22	22	4	20	130	142	−12	48
12	NW	Edmonton Oilers	48	19	22	7	17	125	134	−9	45
13	NW	Calgary Flames	48	19	25	4	19	128	160	−32	42
14	CE	Nashville Predators	48	16	23	9	14	111	139	−28	41
15	NW	Colorado Avalanche	48	16	25	7	14	116	152	−36	39

Source: National Hockey League
p – Clinched Presidents' Trophy; x – Clinched playoff spot; y – Clinched division

== Schedule and results ==
2012–13 Game Log

January: 4–2–1 (Home: 4–1–0; Road: 0–1–1)
#	Date	Visitor	Score	Home	OT	Decision	Attendance	Record	Pts	Recap
1	January 19	Colorado Avalanche	2–4	Minnesota Wild		Backstrom	19,298	1–0–0	2
2	January 20	Dallas Stars	0–1	Minnesota Wild		Harding	18,296	2–0–0	4
3	January 22	Nashville Predators	3–1	Minnesota Wild		Backstrom	17,540	2–1–0	4
4	January 25	Minnesota Wild	3–5	Detroit Red Wings		Harding	20,066	2–2–0	4
5	January 27	Minnesota Wild	4–5	St. Louis Blues	OT	Backstrom	18,265	2–2–1	5
6	January 29	Columbus Blue Jackets	2–3	Minnesota Wild		Backstrom	17,584	3–2–1	7
7	January 30	Chicago Blackhawks	2–3	Minnesota Wild	SO	Backstrom	18,550	4–2–1	9

February: 6–5–1 (Home: 3–1–1; Road: 3–4–0)
#	Date	Visitor	Score	Home	OT	Decision	Attendance	Record	Pts	Recap
8	February 1	Minnesota Wild	1–3	Anaheim Ducks		Backstrom	13,007	4–3–1	9
9	February 4	Minnesota Wild	1–2	Phoenix Coyotes		Backstrom	9,508	4–4–1	9
10	February 7	Vancouver Canucks	4–1	Minnesota Wild		Backstrom	18,352	4–5–1	9
11	February 9	Nashville Predators	1–2	Minnesota Wild	OT	Backstrom	18,806	5–5–1	11
12	February 11	Minnesota Wild	2–1	Calgary Flames	SO	Backstrom	19,289	6–5–1	13
13	February 12	Minnesota Wild	1–2	Vancouver Canucks		Kuemper	18,910	6–6–1	13
14	February 14	Colorado Avalanche	4–3	Minnesota Wild	SO	Backstrom	18,822	6–6–2	14
15	February 17	Detroit Red Wings	2–3	Minnesota Wild		Kuemper	19,117	7–6–2	16
16	February 21	Minnesota Wild	3–1	Edmonton Oilers		Backstrom	16,839	8–6–2	18
17	February 23	Minnesota Wild	1–3	Calgary Flames		Backstrom	19,289	8–7–2	18
18	February 26	Calgary Flames	1–2	Minnesota Wild	OT	Backstrom	18,703	9–7–2	20
19	February 28	Minnesota Wild	4–3	Phoenix Coyotes		Backstrom	11,547	10–7–2	22

March: 11–4–0 (Home: 6–1–0; Road: 5–3–0)
#	Date	Visitor	Score	Home	OT	Decision	Attendance	Record	Pts	Recap
20	March 1	Minnesota Wild	2–3	Anaheim Ducks		Kuemper	15,264	10–8–2	22
21	March 3	Edmonton Oilers	2–4	Minnesota Wild		Backstrom	18,675	11–8–2	24
22	March 5	Minnesota Wild	3–5	Chicago Blackhawks		Backstrom	21,836	11–9–2	24
23	March 9	Minnesota Wild	2–1	Nashville Predators	SO	Backstrom	17,113	12–9–2	26
24	March 10	Vancouver Canucks	2–4	Minnesota Wild		Backstrom	18,846	13–9–2	28
25	March 12	Anaheim Ducks	2–1	Minnesota Wild		Backstrom	18,808	13–10–2	28
26	March 14	Colorado Avalanche	3–5	Minnesota Wild		Backstrom	18,989	14–10–2	30
27	March 16	Minnesota Wild	6–4	Colorado Avalanche		Backstrom	17,708	15–10–2	32
28	March 18	Minnesota Wild	3–1	Vancouver Canucks		Backstrom	18,910	16–10–2	34
29	March 20	Minnesota Wild	4–2	Detroit Red Wings		Backstrom	20,066	17–10–2	36
30	March 23	San Jose Sharks	0–2	Minnesota Wild		Backstrom	19,358	18–10–2	38
31	March 25	Minnesota Wild	7–4	Dallas Stars		Backstrom	16,167	19–10–2	40
32	March 27	Phoenix Coyotes	3–4	Minnesota Wild	OT	Backstrom	19,076	20–10–2	42
33	March 29	Minnesota Wild	3–5	Dallas Stars		Hackett	17,376	20–11–2	42
34	March 30	Los Angeles Kings	3–4	Minnesota Wild	SO	Backstrom	19,223	21–11–2	44

April: 5–8–1 (Home: 1–5–1; Road: 4–3–0)
#	Date	Visitor	Score	Home	OT	Decision	Attendance	Record	Pts	Recap
35	April 1	St. Louis Blues	4–1	Minnesota Wild		Backstrom	18,786	21–12–2	44
36	April 3	Minnesota Wild	2–4	San Jose Sharks		Backstrom	17,562	21–13–2	44
37	April 4	Minnesota Wild	0–3	Los Angeles Kings		Backstrom	18,118	21–14–2	44
38	April 7	Minnesota Wild	3–0	Columbus Blue Jackets		Backstrom	15,909	22–14–2	46
39	April 9	Chicago Blackhawks	1–0	Minnesota Wild		Backstrom	19,158	22–15–2	46
40	April 11	St. Louis Blues	2–0	Minnesota Wild		Backstrom	18,947	22–16–2	46
41	April 13	Columbus Blue Jackets	3–2	Minnesota Wild	SO	Backstrom	19,187	22–16–3	47
42	April 15	Minnesota Wild	4–3	Calgary Flames		Backstrom	19,289	23–16–3	49
43	April 16	Minnesota Wild	5–3	Edmonton Oilers		Backstrom	16,839	24–16–3	51
44	April 18	Minnesota Wild	1–6	San Jose Sharks		Backstrom	17,562	24–17–3	51
45	April 21	Calgary Flames	4–1	Minnesota Wild		Backstrom	19,039	24–18–3	51
46	April 23	Los Angeles Kings	1–2	Minnesota Wild		Backstrom	18,825	25–18–3	53
47	April 26	Edmonton Oilers	6–1	Minnesota Wild		Backstrom	19,090	25–19–3	53
48	April 27	Minnesota Wild	3–1	Colorado Avalanche		Backstrom	17,731	26–19–3	55

Legend: Win (2 points) Loss (0 points) Overtime/shootout loss (1 point)

== Playoffs ==
2013 Stanley Cup Playoffs

Western Conference quarterfinals – Blackhawks won series 4–1
#	Date	Visitor	Score	Home	OT	Decision	Attendance	Series	Recap
1	April 30	Minnesota Wild	1–2	Chicago Blackhawks	OT	Harding	21,428	Blackhawks lead 1–0
2	May 3	Minnesota Wild	2–5	Chicago Blackhawks		Harding	22,012	Blackhawks lead 2–0
3	May 5	Chicago Blackhawks	2–3	Minnesota Wild	OT	Harding	19,238	Blackhawks lead 2–1
4	May 7	Chicago Blackhawks	3–0	Minnesota Wild		Harding	19,378	Blackhawks lead 3–1
5	May 9	Minnesota Wild	1–5	Chicago Blackhawks		Harding	21,597	Blackhawks win 4–1

== Player statistics ==
Finals stats

Skaters

Regular season
Player	GP	G	A	Pts	+/-	PIM
Zach Parise	48	18	20	38	2	16
Mikko Koivu	48	11	26	37	2	26
Ryan Suter	48	4	28	32	2	24
Matt Cullen	42	7	20	27	9	10
Devin Setoguchi	48	13	14	27	5	20
Dany Heatley	36	11	10	21	−12	8
Pierre-Marc Bouchard	43	8	12	20	3	8
Jared Spurgeon	39	5	10	15	1	4
Charlie Coyle	37	8	6	14	3	28
Tom Gilbert	43	3	10	13	−11	18
Kyle Brodziak	48	8	4	12	−18	20
Jonas Brodin	45	2	9	11	3	10
Clayton Stoner	48	0	10	10	0	42
Cal Clutterbuck	42	4	6	10	−5	27
Jason Pominville^{†}	10	4	5	9	0	0
Torrey Mitchell	45	4	4	8	−8	21
Mikael Granlund	27	2	6	8	−4	6
Jason Zucker	20	4	1	5	4	8
Mike Rupp^{†}	32	1	3	4	1	67
Justin Falk	36	0	3	3	−9	40
Brett Clark	8	0	1	1	−9	0
Marco Scandella	6	1	0	1	−1	4
Zenon Konopka	37	0	0	0	−4	117
Jake Dowell	2	0	0	0	0	0
Nate Prosser	17	0	0	0	4	4
Johan Larsson^{‡}	1	0	0	0	0	0
Darroll Powe^{‡}	8	0	0	0	1	9

Playoffs
Player	GP	G	A	Pts	+/-	PIM
Matt Cullen	5	0	3	3	1	2
Pierre-Marc Bouchard	5	1	1	2	2	0
Kyle Brodziak	5	0	2	2	0	4
Cal Clutterbuck	5	1	1	2	0	4
Marco Scandella	5	1	1	2	−1	0
Jason Zucker	5	1	1	2	1	0
Charlie Coyle	5	0	2	2	−4	2
Zach Parise	5	1	0	1	−7	2
Clayton Stoner	1	0	1	1	1	0
Torrey Mitchell	5	1	0	1	−4	0
Devin Setoguchi	5	1	0	1	−2	0
Mike Rupp	4	0	0	0	−3	12
Mikko Koivu	5	0	0	0	−6	8
Jason Pominville	2	0	0	0	−1	0
Stephane Veilleux	2	0	0	0	0	0
Zenon Konopka	2	0	0	0	−2	0
Tom Gilbert	5	0	0	0	−2	2
Ryan Suter	5	0	0	0	−5	4
Justin Falk	4	0	0	0	−3	2
Jared Spurgeon	5	0	0	0	−3	2
Jonas Brodin	5	0	0	0	−3	0

Goaltenders

Regular season
Player	GP	GS	TOI	W	L	OT	GA	GAA	SA	SV%	SO	G	A	PIM
Niklas Backstrom	42	41	2368:08	24	15	3	98	2.48	1072	.909	2	0	0	2
Darcy Kuemper	6	3	288:18	1	2	0	10	2.08	119	.916	0	0	0	0
Josh Harding	5	3	185:05	1	1	0	10	3.24	73	.863	1	0	0	0
Matt Hackett^{‡}	1	1	59:12	0	1	0	5	5.08	33	.848	0	0	0	0

Goaltenders

Playoffs
Player	GP	GS	TOI	W	L	GA	GAA	SA	SV%	SO	G	A	PIM
Josh Harding	5	5	244:48	1	4	12	2.94	135	.911	0	0	0	0
Darcy Kuemper	2	0	73:27	0	0	4	3.29	33	.879	0	0	0	0

^{†}Denotes player spent time with another team before joining the Wild. Stats reflect time with the Wild only.
^{‡}Traded mid-season
Bold/italics denotes franchise record

== Awards and records ==
=== Awards ===
Regular Season
Player	Award	Awarded
Josh Harding	Bill Masterton Memorial Trophy	June 14, 2013

== Transactions ==
The Wild have been involved in the following transactions during the 2012–13 season.

=== Trades ===
Date	Details
February 4, 2013	To New York Rangers Darroll Powe; Nick Palmieri	To Minnesota Wild Mike Rupp
March 12, 2013	To Ottawa Senators Matt Kassian	To Minnesota Wild 6th-round pick in 2014
March 14, 2013	To Washington Capitals Chay Genoway	To Minnesota Wild Conditional 7th-round pick in 2014 (Note: Condition not satisfied.)
April 3, 2013	To Buffalo Sabres Matt Hackett; Johan Larsson; 1st-round pick in 2013; 2nd-round pick in 2014	To Minnesota Wild Jason Pominville; 4th-round pick in 2014
April 3, 2013	To Anaheim Ducks Future considerations	To Minnesota Wild Jeff Deslauriers

=== Free agents signed ===
Player	Former team	Contract terms
Torrey Mitchell	San Jose Sharks	3 years, $5.7 million
Zenon Konopka	Ottawa Senators	2 years, $1.85 million
Jake Dowell	Dallas Stars	2 years, $1.4 million
Zach Parise	New Jersey Devils	13 years, $98 million
Ryan Suter	Nashville Predators	13 years, $98 million
Brian Connelly	Abbotsford Heat	2 years, $1.225 million
Brett Clark	Oklahoma City Barons	1 year, $900,000

=== Free agents lost ===
Player	New team	Contract terms
Erik Christensen	Lev Prague	undisclosed
Warren Peters	Pittsburgh Penguins	1 year, $600,000
Guillaume Latendresse	Ottawa Senators	1 year, $2 million
Mike Lundin	Ottawa Senators	1 year, $1.15 million
Nick Johnson	Phoenix Coyotes	1 year, $725,000
Kurtis Foster	Philadelphia Flyers	1 year, $950,000

=== Claimed via waivers ===
Player	Former team	Date claimed off waivers

=== Lost via waivers ===
Player	New team	Date claimed off waivers

=== Player signings ===
Player	Date	Contract terms
Josh Harding	June 19, 2012	3 years, $5.7 million
Chad Rau	June 25, 2012	2 years, $1.125 million
Stephane Veilleux	June 25, 2012	1 year, $600,000
Matt Kassian	June 28, 2012	2 years, $1.15 million
Chay Genoway	June 29, 2012	2 years, $1.15 million
Justin Falk	July 5, 2012	1 year, $825,000
Mathew Dumba	July 19, 2012	3 years, $2.775 million entry-level contract
Nick Palmieri	January 15, 2013	1 year, $577,500
Tyler Graovac	April 2, 2013	3 years, $2.2425 million entry-level contract
Erik Haula	April 7, 2013	2 years, $1.8 million entry-level contract
Raphael Bussieres	May 9, 2013	3 years, $2.2775 million entry-level contract
Stephane Veilleux	June 12, 2013	2 years, $1.175 million
Marco Scandella	June 17, 2013	2 years, $2.05 million
Niklas Backstrom	June 24, 2013	3 years, $10.25 million
Steven Kampfer	June 28, 2013	1 year, $550,000

== Draft picks ==
Minnesota's picks at the 2012 NHL entry draft in Pittsburgh, Pennsylvania.

Round	#	Player	Pos	Nationality	College/Junior/Club team (League)
1	7	Mathew Dumba	D	Canada	Red Deer Rebels (WHL)
2	46^{[a]}	Raphael Bussieres	LW	Canada	Baie-Comeau Drakkar (QMJHL)
3	68	John Draeger	D	United States	Shattuck-Saint Mary's (Midget AAA)
4	98	Adam Gilmour	C	United States	Noble and Greenough School (USHS-MA)
5	128	Daniel Gunnarsson	D	Sweden	Lulea HF (Elitserien)
6	158	Christopher Bertschy	C	Switzerland	SC Bern (NLA)
7	188	Louis Nanne	LW	United States	Edina High School (USHS-MN)

Draft notes

- ^{a} The New Jersey Devils' second-round pick (from Washington Capitals) went to the Minnesota Wild as a result of a February 24, 2012, trade that sent Marek Zidlicky to the Devils in exchange for Kurtis Foster, Nick Palmieri, Stephane Veilleux and this pick.
- The Wild's second-round pick went to the San Jose Sharks as the result of a June 24, 2011, trade that sent Devin Setoguchi, Charlie Coyle and a 2011 first-round pick to the Wild in exchange for Brent Burns and this pick.

== See also ==
- 2012–13 NHL season
