= 2012–13 Detroit Red Wings season =

Sports season

2012–13 Detroit Red Wings
- Division: 3rd Central
- Conference: 7th Western
- 2012–13 record: 24–16–8
- Home record: 13–7–4
- Road record: 11–9–4
- Goals for: 124
- Goals against: 115

Team information
- General manager: Ken Holland
- Coach: Mike Babcock
- Captain: Henrik Zetterberg
- Alternate captains: Pavel Datsyuk; Niklas Kronwall
- Arena: Joe Louis Arena
- Average attendance: 20,066 (100%); Total: 481,584 (24 games)

Team leaders
- Goals: Pavel Datsyuk (15)
- Assists: Henrik Zetterberg (37)
- Points: Pavel Datsyuk (49)
- Penalty minutes: Jordin Tootoo (78)
- Plus/minus: Pavel Datsyuk (+21)
- Wins: Jimmy Howard (21)
- Goals against average: Jimmy Howard (2.13)

The 2012–13 Detroit Red Wings season was the 87th season for the National Hockey League (NHL) franchise that was established on September 25, 1926. The regular season was reduced from its usual 82 games to 48 due to a lockout. This was the first time since the 1990–91 season that the Red Wings did not have Nicklas Lidstrom on their roster although the Red Wings drafted Lidstrom in the 1989 NHL entry draft but Lidstrom didn't made his Red Wings debut until the 1991–92 season, Lidstrom retired during the 2012 offseason. Henrik Zetterberg was appointed as team captain.

As of 2026, this is the most recent season that the Red Wings won a playoff series.

== Off-season ==
On May 31, 2012, defenseman Nicklas Lidstrom announced his retirement from the NHL after 20 seasons. Lidstrom won four Stanley Cups and seven Norris Trophies during his Hall of Fame career, all with the Red Wings.

== Regular season ==
Central Division
Pos	Team	GP	W	L	OTL	ROW	GF	GA	GD	Pts
1	p – Chicago Blackhawks	48	36	7	5	30	155	102	+53	77
2	x – St. Louis Blues	48	29	17	2	24	129	115	+14	60
3	x – Detroit Red Wings	48	24	16	8	22	124	115	+9	56
4	Columbus Blue Jackets	48	24	17	7	19	120	119	+1	55
5	Nashville Predators	48	16	23	9	14	111	139	−28	41

Source: National Hockey League
p – Clinched Presidents' Trophy; x – Clinched playoff spot

Western Conference
Pos	Div	Team	GP	W	L	OTL	ROW	GF	GA	GD	Pts
1	CE	p – Chicago Blackhawks	48	36	7	5	30	155	102	+53	77
2	PA	y – Anaheim Ducks	48	30	12	6	24	140	118	+22	66
3	NW	y – Vancouver Canucks	48	26	15	7	21	127	121	+6	59
4	CE	x – St. Louis Blues	48	29	17	2	24	129	115	+14	60
5	PA	x – Los Angeles Kings	48	27	16	5	25	133	118	+15	59
6	PA	x – San Jose Sharks	48	25	16	7	17	124	116	+8	57
7	CE	x – Detroit Red Wings	48	24	16	8	22	124	115	+9	56
8	NW	x – Minnesota Wild	48	26	19	3	22	122	127	−5	55
9	CE	Columbus Blue Jackets	48	24	17	7	19	120	119	+1	55
10	PA	Phoenix Coyotes	48	21	18	9	17	125	131	−6	51
11	PA	Dallas Stars	48	22	22	4	20	130	142	−12	48
12	NW	Edmonton Oilers	48	19	22	7	17	125	134	−9	45
13	NW	Calgary Flames	48	19	25	4	19	128	160	−32	42
14	CE	Nashville Predators	48	16	23	9	14	111	139	−28	41
15	NW	Colorado Avalanche	48	16	25	7	14	116	152	−36	39

Source: National Hockey League
p – Clinched Presidents' Trophy; x – Clinched playoff spot; y – Clinched division

=== Schedule and results ===
2012–13 Game Log

January: 3–2–1 (Home: 2–1–0; Road: 1–1–1)
#	Date	Visitor	Score	Home	OT	Decision	Record	Pts	Recap
1	January 19	Detroit	L 0–6	St. Louis		Howard	0–1–0	0	Recap
2	January 21	Detroit	W 4–3	Columbus	SO	Howard	1–1–0	2	Recap
3	January 22	Dallas	L 1–2	Detroit		Howard	1–2–0	2	Recap
4	January 25	Minnesota	W 5–3	Detroit		Howard	2–2–0	4	Recap
5	January 27	Detroit	L 1–2	Chicago	OT	Howard	2–2–1	5	Recap
6	January 29	Dallas	W 1–4	Detroit		Howard	3–2–1	7	Recap

February: 7–6–2 (Home: 5–3–1; Road: 2–3–1)
#	Date	Visitor	Score	Home	OT	Decision	Record	Pts	Recap
7	February 1	St. Louis	W 3–5	Detroit		Howard	4–2–1	9	Recap
8	February 2	Detroit	L 2–4	Columbus		Howard	4–3–1	9	Recap
9	February 5	Calgary	L 4–1	Detroit		Howard	4–4–1	9	Recap
10	February 7	Detroit	W 5–1	St. Louis		Mrazek	5–4–1	11	Recap
11	February 9	Edmonton	W 1–2	Detroit		Howard	6–4–1	13	Recap
12	February 10	Los Angeles	W2–3	Detroit		Howard	7–4–1	15	Recap
13	February 13	St. Louis	L 4–3	Detroit	OT	Howard	7–4–2	16	Recap
14	February 15	Anaheim	L 5–2	Detroit		Howard	7–5–2	16	Recap
15	February 17	Detroit	L 2–3	Minnesota		Mrazek	7–6–2	16	Recap
16	February 19	Detroit	L 3–4	Nashville	OT	Howard	7–6–3	17	Recap
17	February 21	Columbus	L 3–2	Detroit		Howard	7–7–3	19	Recap
18	February 23	Nashville	W 0–4	Detroit		Howard	8–7–3	19	Recap
19	February 24	Vancouver	W 3–8	Detroit		Howard	9–7–3	21	Recap
20	February 27	Detroit	L 1–2	Los Angeles		Howard	9–8–3	21	Recap
21	February 28	Detroit	W 2–1	San Jose	OT	Gustavsson	10–8–3	23	Recap

March: 7–5–2 (Home: 2–2–2; Road: 5–3–0)
#	Date	Visitor	Score	Home	OT	Decision	Record	Pts	Recap
22	March 3	Chicago	L 2–1	Detroit	SO	Howard	10–8–4	24	Recap
23	March 5	Colorado	W 1–2	Detroit		Howard	11–8–4	26	Recap
24	March 7	Edmonton	W 0–3	Detroit		Howard	12–8–4	28	Recap
25	March 9	Detroit	L 0–3	Columbus		Gustavsson	12–9–4	28	Recap
26	March 10	Columbus	L 3–2	Detroit	SO	Howard	12–9–5	29	Recap
27	March 13	Detroit	L 2–5	Calgary		Gustavsson	12–10–5	29	Recap
28	March 15	Detroit	W 3–2	Edmonton	OT	Howard	13–10–5	31	Recap
29	March 16	Detroit	W 5–2	Vancouver		Howard	14–10–5	33	Recap
30	March 20	Minnesota	L 4–2	Detroit		Howard	14–11–5	33	Recap
31	March 22	Detroit	W 5–1	Anaheim		Howard	15–11–5	35	Recap
32	March 24	Detroit	W 2–1	Anaheim		Howard	16–11–5	37	Recap
33	March 25	Detroit	W 3–2	Phoenix		Gustavsson	17–11–5	39	Recap
34	March 28	Detroit	L 0–2	San Jose		Howard	17–12–5	39	Recap
35	March 31	Chicago	L 7–1	Detroit		Howard	17–13–5	39	Recap

April: 7–3–3 (Home: 4–1–1; Road: 3–2–2)
#	Date	Visitor	Score	Home	OT	Decision	Record	Pts	Recap
36	April 1	Colorado	W 2–3	Detroit		Howard	18–13–5	41	Recap
37	April 4	Detroit	L 2–4	Phoenix		Howard	18–14–5	41	Recap
38	April 5	Detroit	W 3–2	Colorado	OT	Howard	19–14–5	43	Recap
39	April 7	St. Louis	L 1–0	Detroit		Howard	19–15–5	43	Recap
40	April 11	San Jose	L 3–2	Detroit	SO	Howard	19–15–6	44	Recap
41	April 12	Detroit	L 2–3	Chicago	SO	Howard	19–15–7	45	Recap
42	April 14	Detroit	W 3–0	Nashville		Howard	20–15–7	47	Recap
43	April 17	Detroit	L 2–3	Calgary		Howard	20–16–7	47	Recap
44	April 20	Detroit	L 1–2	Vancouver	SO	Howard	20–16–8	48	Recap
45	April 22	Phoenix	W 0–4	Detroit		Howard	21–16–8	50	Recap
46	April 24	Los Angeles	W 1–3	Detroit		Howard	22–16–8	52	Recap
47	April 25	Nashville	W 2–5	Detroit		Howard	23–16–8	54	Recap
48	April 27	Detroit	W 3–0	Dallas		Howard	24–16–8	56	Recap
Legend: Win (2 points) Loss (0 points) Overtime/shootout loss (1 point)

== Playoffs ==
2013 Stanley Cup Playoffs

Western Conference Quarterfinals vs. (2) Anaheim Ducks – Detroit won series 4–3
#	Date	Visitor	Score	Home	OT	Decision	Series	Recap
1	April 30	Detroit	1–3	Anaheim		Howard	0–1	Recap
2	May 2	Detroit	5–4	Anaheim	OT	Howard	1–1	Recap
3	May 4	Anaheim	4–0	Detroit		Howard	1–2	Recap
4	May 6	Anaheim	2–3	Detroit	OT	Howard	2–2	Recap
5	May 8	Detroit	2–3	Anaheim	OT	Howard	2–3	Recap
6	May 10	Anaheim	3–4	Detroit	OT	Howard	3–3	Recap
7	May 12	Detroit	3–2	Anaheim		Howard	4–3	Recap

Western Conference Semifinals vs. (1) Chicago Blackhawks – Chicago won series 4–3
#	Date	Visitor	Score	Home	OT	Decision	Series	Recap
1	May 15	Detroit	1–4	Chicago		Howard	0–1	Recap
2	May 18	Detroit	4–1	Chicago		Howard	1–1	Recap
3	May 20	Chicago	1–3	Detroit		Howard	2–1	Recap
4	May 23	Chicago	0–2	Detroit		Howard	3–1	Recap
5	May 25	Detroit	1–4	Chicago		Howard	3–2	Recap
6	May 27	Chicago	4–3	Detroit		Howard	3–3	Recap
7	May 29	Detroit	1–2	Chicago	OT	Howard	3–4	Recap

== Player statistics ==
Skaters

Regular season
Player	GP	G	A	Pts	+/-	PIM
Pavel Datsyuk	47	15	34	49	21	14
Henrik Zetterberg	46	11	37	48	2	18
Johan Franzen	41	14	17	31	13	41
Niklas Kronwall	48	5	24	29	−5	44
Damien Brunner	44	12	14	26	−6	12
Valtteri Filppula	41	9	8	17	−4	6
Daniel Cleary	48	9	6	15	−6	40
Jonathan Ericsson	45	3	10	13	6	29
Jakub Kindl	41	4	9	13	15	28
Justin Abdelkader	48	10	3	13	6	34
Jordin Tootoo	42	3	5	8	0	78
Patrick Eaves	34	2	6	8	−1	4
Drew Miller	44	4	4	8	−8	2
Cory Emmerton	48	5	3	8	−1	4
Brendan Smith	34	0	8	8	1	36
Joakim Andersson	38	3	5	8	2	8
Tomas Tatar	18	4	3	7	2	4
Gustav Nyquist	22	3	3	6	0	6
Brian Lashoff	31	1	4	5	−10	15
Ian White	25	2	2	4	5	4
Todd Bertuzzi	7	2	1	3	3	2
Kyle Quincey	36	1	2	3	7	18
Mikael Samuelsson	4	0	1	1	−3	0
Carlo Colaiacovo	6	0	1	1	−4	2
Danny DeKeyser	11	0	1	1	4	2
Darren Helm	1	0	0	0	0	2
Jan Mursak	2	0	0	0	0	4
Riley Sheahan	1	0	0	0	0	0
Kent Huskins^{‡}	11	0	0	0	−3	4

Playoffs
Player	GP	G	A	Pts	+/-	PIM
Henrik Zetterberg	14	4	8	12	3	8
Daniel Cleary	14	4	6	10	−1	2
Pavel Datsyuk	14	3	6	9	2	4
Damien Brunner	14	5	4	9	2	4
Valtteri Filppula	14	2	4	6	−4	4
Johan Franzen	14	4	2	6	−7	8
Jakub Kindl	14	1	4	5	4	10
Brendan Smith	14	2	3	5	−3	10
Joakim Andersson	14	1	4	5	2	10
Gustav Nyquist	14	2	3	5	3	2
Jonathan Ericsson	14	0	3	3	2	2
Patrick Eaves	13	1	2	3	−1	4
Justin Abdelkader	12	2	1	3	4	33
Mikael Samuelsson	5	1	1	2	−1	2
Niklas Kronwall	14	0	2	2	−1	4
Kyle Quincey	14	0	2	2	−3	12
Drew Miller	6	1	1	2	1	2
Carlo Colaiacovo	9	0	1	1	3	2
Cory Emmerton	13	0	1	1	−2	4
Todd Bertuzzi	6	0	0	0	−2	2
Jordin Tootoo	1	0	0	0	0	2
Brian Lashoff	3	0	0	0	0	0
Danny DeKeyser	2	0	0	0	0	0

Goaltenders

Regular season
Player	GP	GS	TOI	W	L	OT	GA	GAA	SA	SV%	SO	G	A	PIM
Jimmy Howard	42	42	2445:44	21	13	7	87	2.13	1,129	.923	5	0	1	0
Jonas Gustavsson	7	4	349:15	2	2	1	17	2.92	140	.879	0	0	1	2
Petr Mrazek	2	2	119:09	1	1	0	4	2.02	51	.922	0	0	0	0

Goaltenders

Playoffs
Player	GP	GS	TOI	W	L	GA	GAA	SA	SV%	SO	G	A	PIM
Jimmy Howard	14	14	859:28	7	7	35	2.44	461	.924	1	0	0	2

^{†}Denotes player spent time with another team before joining the Red Wings. Stats reflect time with the Red Wings only.
^{‡}Traded mid-season
Bold/italics denotes franchise record

== Awards and records ==
=== Awards ===
Regular season
Player	Award	Awarded
Jimmy Howard	NHL First Star of the Week	April 29, 2013
Henrik Zetterberg	NHL Second Star of the Week	April 29, 2013

=== Records ===
24 consecutive home wins

=== Milestones ===
Regular season
Player	Milestone	Reached
Brian Lashoff	1st Career NHL Game; 1st Career NHL Goal	January 21, 2013
Damien Brunner	1st Career NHL Goal; 1st Career NHL Point	January 22, 2013
Kent Huskins	300th Career NHL Game	January 22, 2013
Damien Brunner	1st Career NHL Assist	January 27, 2013
Daniel Cleary	500th Career NHL Game	February 2, 2013
Jimmy Howard	200th Career NHL Game	February 2, 2013
Todd Bertuzzi	1,100th Career NHL Game	February 7, 2013
Petr Mrazek	1st Career NHL Game; 1st Career NHL Win	February 7, 2013
Tomas Tatar	1st Career NHL Assist	February 7, 2013
Niklas Kronwall	50th Career NHL Goal	February 9, 2013
Jordin Tootoo	500th Career NHL Game	February 15, 2013
Joakim Andersson	1st Career NHL Goal; 1st Career NHL Assist; 1st Career NHL Point	February 15, 2013
Brian Lashoff	1st Career NHL Assist	February 17, 2013
Drew Miller	300th Career NHL Game	February 27, 2013
Cory Emmerton	100th Career NHL Game	March 13, 2013
Patrick Eaves	400th career NHL Game	March 16, 2013
Pavel Datsyuk	250th Career NHL Goal; 500th Career NHL Assist	March 22, 2013
Henrik Zetterberg	700th Career NHL Game	March 24, 2013
Niklas Kronwall	500th Career NHL Game	March 25, 2013
Ian White	500th Career NHL Game	March 31, 2013
Johan Franzen	500th Career NHL Game	March 31, 2013
Henrik Zetterberg	400th Career NHL Assist	April 11, 2013
Danny DeKeyser	1st Career NHL Assist; 1st Career NHL Point	April 14, 2013
Johan Franzen	300th Career NHL Point	April 14, 2013
Valtteri Filppula	100th Career NHL Goal	April 25, 2013

Playoffs
Player	Milestone	Reached
Danny DeKeyser	1st Career NHL Playoff Game	April 30, 2013
Jakub Kindl	1st Career NHL Playoff Assist	April 30, 2013
Gustav Nyquist	1st Career NHL Playoff Goal	May 2, 2013
Damien Brunner	1st Career NHL Playoff Goal	May 2, 2013
Brian Lashoff	1st Career NHL Playoff Game	May 4, 2013
Mikael Samuelsson	100th Career NHL Playoff Game	May 4, 2013
Joakim Andersson	1st Career NHL Playoff Assist	May 6, 2013
Brendan Smith	1st Career NHL Playoff Goal; 1st Career NHL Playoff Assist	May 6, 2013
Gustav Nyquist	1st Career NHL Playoff Assist	May 6, 2013
Pavel Datsyuk	100th Career NHL Playoff Point	May 10, 2013
Valtteri Filppula	100th Career NHL Playoff Game	May 18, 2013
Cory Emmerton	1st Career NHL Playoff Assist	May 20, 2013
Jakub Kindl	1st Career NHL Playoff Goal	May 23, 2013
Johan Franzen	100th Career NHL Playoff Game	May 25, 2013
Joakim Andersson	1st Career NHL Playoff Goal	May 27, 2013

== Transactions ==
The Red Wings have been involved in the following transactions during the 2012–13 season.

=== Trades ===
Date	Details
June 10, 2012	To San Jose Sharks Brad Stuart (Note: Trade of negotiating rights to.)	To Detroit Red Wings Andrew Murray (Note: Trade of negotiating rights to.); Conditional 7th-round pick in 2014 (Note: Condition satisfied.)
March 30, 2013	To Philadelphia Flyers Kent Huskins	To Detroit Red Wings Conditional 7th-round pick in 2014 (Note: Condition not satisfied.)

=== Free agents signed ===
Player	Former team	Contract terms	Ref
Jonas Gustavsson	Winnipeg Jets	2 years, $3 million	
Damien Brunner	EV Zug	1 year, $925,000	
Mikael Samuelsson	Florida Panthers	2 years, $6 million	
Jordin Tootoo	Nashville Predators	3 years, $5.7 million	
Carlo Colaiacovo	St. Louis Blues	2 years, $5 million	
Kent Huskins	St. Louis Blues	1 year, $750,000	
Danny DeKeyser	Western Michigan University	2 years, $1.85 million entry-level contract	
Jared Coreau	Northern Michigan University	3 years, $2.3775 million entry-level contract	

=== Free agents lost ===
Player	New team	Contract terms	Ref
Jiri Hudler	Calgary Flames	4 years, $16 million	
Chris Conner	Phoenix Coyotes	1 year, $650,000	
Andrew Murray	St. Louis Blues	1 year, $600,000	

=== Lost via waivers ===
Player	New team	Date claimed off waivers	Ref
Joey MacDonald	Calgary Flames	February 11, 2013	

=== Lost via retirement ===
Player	Ref
Nicklas Lidstrom	
Tomas Holmstrom	

=== Player signings ===
Player	Date	Contract terms
Darren Helm	June 19, 2012	4 years, $8.5 million
Max Nicastro	July 3, 2012	2 years, $1.225 million entry-level contract
Marek Tvrdon	July 3, 2012	3 years, entry-level contract
Kyle Quincey	July 18, 2012	2 years, $7.55 million
Martin Frk	July 31, 2012	3 years, $2.1025 million entry-level contract
Tomas Jurco	August 7, 2012	3 years, $2.1275 million entry-level contract
Justin Abdelkader	September 14, 2012	4 years, $7.2 million
Nick Jensen	May 2, 2013	2 years, $1.53 million entry-level contract
Mattias Backman	May 21, 2013	3 years, $2.1525 million entry-level contract
Alexey Marchenko	May 30, 2013	3 years, $2 million entry-level contract
Pavel Datsyuk	June 18, 2013	3 years, $22.5 million contract extension
Jakub Kindl	June 29, 2013	4 years, $9.6 million contract extension
Drew Miller	June 29, 2013	3 years, $4.05 million contract extension

== Draft picks ==
The Detroit Red Wings' picks at the 2012 NHL entry draft, held in Pittsburgh, Pennsylvania on June 22 & 23, 2012.

Round	#	Player	Pos	Nationality	College/Junior/Club team (League)
2	49	Martin Frk	RW	Czech Republic	Halifax Mooseheads (QMJHL)
3	80	Jake Paterson	G	Canada	Saginaw Spirit (OHL)
4	110	Andreas Athanasiou	C/LW	Canada	London Knights (OHL)
5	140	Michael McKee	D	Canada	Lincoln Stars (USHL)
6	170	James De Haas	D	Canada	Toronto Lakeshore Patriots (OJHL)
7	200	Rasmus Bodin	LW	Sweden	Ostersunds IK (Division 1)

Draft notes

- The Red Wings' first-round pick went to the Tampa Bay Lightning as the result of a February 21, 2012, trade that sent Kyle Quincey to the Red Wings in exchange for Sebastien Piche and this pick.

== See also ==
- 2012–13 NHL season
