= 2012–13 Calgary Flames season =

NHL team season

2012–13 Calgary Flames
- Division: 4th Northwest
- Conference: 13th Western
- 2012–13 record: 19–25–4
- Home record: 13–9–2
- Road record: 6–16–2
- Goals for: 128
- Goals against: 160

Team information
- General manager: Jay Feaster
- Coach: Bob Hartley
- Captain: Jarome Iginla (Oct.–Mar.); Vacant (Mar.–Apr.)
- Alternate captains: Jay Bouwmeester (Oct.–Apr.); Michael Cammalleri; Mark Giordano; Curtis Glencross
- Arena: Scotiabank Saddledome
- Average attendance: 19,289 (100%)

Team leaders
- Goals: Curtis Glencross (15)
- Assists: Lee Stempniak (22)
- Points: Lee Stempniak; Michael Cammalleri (32)
- Penalty minutes: Tim Jackman (76)
- Plus/minus: Matt Stajan (+7)
- Wins: Joey MacDonald; Miikka Kiprusoff (8)
- Goals against average: Joey MacDonald (2.87)

The 2012–13 Calgary Flames season was the 33rd season in Calgary and the 41st of History the Flames franchise in the National Hockey League (NHL). The regular season was reduced from its usual 82 games to 48 due to the 2012–13 NHL lockout. Calgary recorded a 19–25–4 record under new head coach Bob Hartley that included a franchise record 13-game losing streak on the road. The Flames finished fourth in the Northwest Division, 13th in the Western Conference and failed to qualify for the 2013 Stanley Cup playoffs. It was the fourth consecutive season that team did not reach the playoffs.

It was a transitional season for the Flames. It marked the end of the Jarome Iginla era, after 17 years. Iginla is the franchise's all-time leader in games played, goals and points, and appearing once in the Stanley Cup Final (2004). Following the long-time Flames captain's trade to the Pittsburgh Penguins, it marked the start of a rebuilding phase as the team brought in younger players. Defensive leader Jay Bouwmeester was also traded, while it was widely speculated in the media that it would also be goaltender Miikka Kiprusoff's final season in the NHL. By virtue of the trades, the Flames ended the season with three first round selections in the 2013 NHL entry draft.

== Off-season ==
The Flames began the off-season searching for a new head coach after announcing they would not renew Brent Sutter's contract. As his replacement, the Flames hired Bob Hartley as the team's new head coach on May 31, 2012. Hartley had spent the 2011–12 season coaching the ZSC Lions to the Swiss National League A championship. At the time Hartley was hired, he had 658 career NHL games coached and led the Colorado Avalanche to the 2001 Stanley Cup championship. The hiring of Hartley brought additional changes to the team's coaching staff. Jacques Cloutier was brought in as an associate coach and Martin Gelinas was hired as an assistant coach. Assistant coach Craig Hartsburg was released by the organization.

== 2012–13 lockout ==
As the NHL Collective Bargaining Agreement (CBA) neared its expiry, a lockout appeared inevitable. The National Hockey League Players' Association (NHLPA) called a meeting for all players in New York for September 12 and 13, a date that coincided with the Flames' annual charity golf tournament, of which the players were featured participants. While fewer than half of the team's players were planning to attend the New York meeting, the players chose en masse to withdraw from the charity event. The decision resulted in widespread outrage by the team's fans, though Flames' management diplomatically expressed only regret that the players could not attend. The team offered to refund all participants' $2,500 entry fee as a result. Only one sponsor accepted, and was replaced by another. The backlash led the players to reverse their position within a day. Ten players, from the Flames active roster along with prospects, chose to attend the event.

The NHL locked out its players when the CBA expired at 10 pm Mountain Time on September 15. Flames captain Jarome Iginla expressed regret that negotiations failed to resolve the impasse, and suggested that he would have been willing to miss an entire season if that was what it would have taken for the union to receive a "fair deal". At the same time, several members of the Flames, along with their counterparts of the Edmonton Oilers, challenged the NHL's right to lock the players out, filing a complaint with the Alberta Labour Relations Board (ALRB). The board, however, rejected the players' application. The ALRB described the petition as an "unhelpful distraction" from the negotiating efforts of the league and its union.

While they waited for a resolution to the dispute, several Flames chose to play in Europe. Mikael Backlund returned to his hometown of Västerås, signing with VIK Västerås HK of the Swedish second division. He appeared in 23 games with the team and scored 30 points. Newcomer Roman Cervenka played first with Slavia Prague in the Czech Extraliga, and later Lev Prague of the Kontinental Hockey League (KHL), but left both teams due to injury. Two other players also went to the KHL: Anton Babchuk skated for HC Donbass while Jiri Hudler also played with Lev Prague.

The league and the players' union reached an agreement on January 7, 2013, that allowed for a shortened 48-game season. Both management and players expressed their regret to the fans for the length of the dispute. Team president Ken King and the team's union representative Matt Stajan apologized to the fans, while Iginla stated that "a simple apology doesn't cut it", and expressed his hope that the team could give the fans an exciting and entertaining product.

== Regular season ==
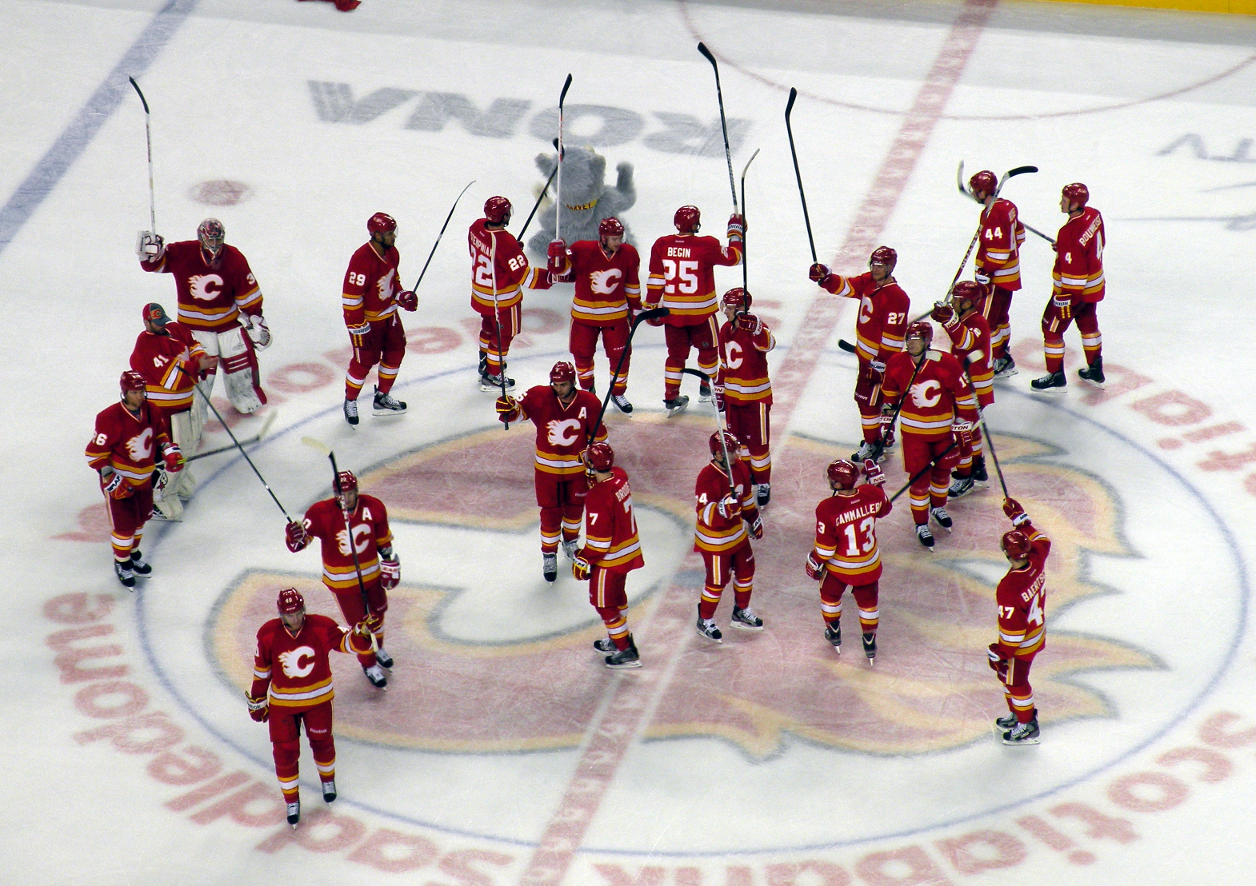
The Flames salute the crowd following a win over the Minnesota Wild.

The abbreviated season opened with five games in January and four of them on home ice. The Flames struggled during the month, posting only one victory against three losses in regulation and a shootout defeat that left the team in last place in the Western Conference entering February. The homestand ended with further frustration for the Flames as they lost to the Chicago Blackhawks, 3–2 in a shootout, despite outshooting their opponent 47–19. Chicago goaltender Ray Emery's performance was described as "criminal" by his head coach Joel Quenneville: "They've got to call the cops after that performance. (Emery) stole two points. He was spectacular." The Flames defeated the Detroit Red Wings on February 5 for their second win, but the victory came at a cost as starting goaltender Miikka Kiprusoff suffered an injury to his Medial collateral ligament. Injuries continued to impact the Flames' roster, as centre Mikael Backlund suffered a sprained knee in the following game, a 4–3 victory over the Columbus Blue Jackets, and was expected to miss at least four weeks. Both Backlund and Kiprusoff were placed on injured reserve, joining Sven Baertschi (hip pointer).

The Flames spent the majority of February trying to move their record above .500. They evened their number of wins and losses on four occasions but lost their next game the first three times before making a fourth attempt against the Minnesota Wild at the end of the month. As the Flames lost close games, Jarome Iginla's goal scoring struggles resulted in criticism directed at the Flames' captain, notably from former teammate-turned-radio host Rhett Warrener, who argued that Iginla had lost the ability to out-battle his opposition. Iginla brushed off the criticism while acknowledging he wasn't scoring as he had hoped with only one goal in the first month of the season. He had only two goals in 28 games dating back to the end of the 2011–12 season, but scored two to lead the Flames to a 5–4 come-from-behind victory over the Phoenix Coyotes on February 24 that evened Calgary's record at 7–7–3.

Having failed to complete a trade with the Colorado Avalanche for centre Ryan O'Reilly, a restricted free agent who was embroiled in a bitter contract dispute with Colorado, general manager Jay Feaster signed O'Reilly to an offer sheet worth $10 million over two years on February 28. The Avalanche immediately exercised their right to match the contract and retained the player. Colorado's decision to match turned out to be a blessing for the Flames, as it was revealed the next day that since O'Reilly had played in Europe after the NHL season began, the Flames would have been required to place him on waivers upon signing him. It would have allowed any team to claim him without compensation while the Flames would still have lost their 2013 first and third round draft picks to Colorado for signing him away. The Flames disagreed with the NHL's interpretation, arguing the language in the memorandum of understanding the League and Union were operating under would have allowed for the signing, but conceded the argument was moot since Colorado matched the offer.

Kiprusoff returned from his injury on March 6 to lead Calgary to a 4–1 victory over the San Jose Sharks that was his 300th career victory with the Flames. The win also moved the Flames' above .500 for the first time with a 9–8–4 record. However, the Flames lost their next three games, all on a California road trip, leaving the team in last place in the Western Conference. As the losses mounted, the media renewed speculation about Iginla's future in Calgary given his contract was set to expire at season's end and the NHL's April 3 trade deadline was rapidly approaching. A pair of home victories over the Detroit Red Wings and Nashville Predators – extending the team's home winning streak to six games – allowed the Flames to move back to an even record at 11–11–4.

=== Trade of Jarome Iginla ===
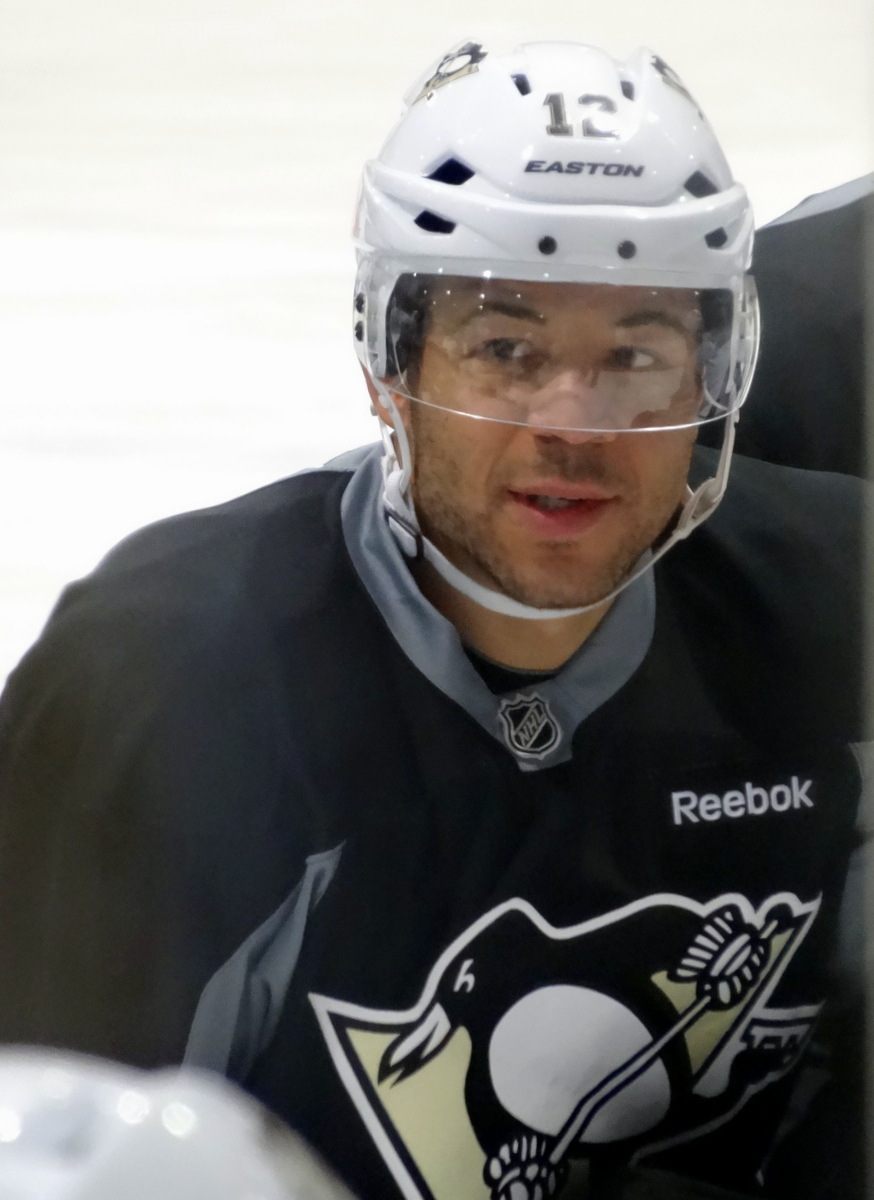
Iginla as a member of the Penguins

The Flames simultaneously had two extended streaks in the middle part of the season, as they won eight consecutive games at home, but suffered their ninth consecutive road loss in a 5–2 defeat at the hands of the Columbus Blue Jackets on March 22 and fell out of playoff contention. As the trade deadline approached, national media outlets reported that Iginla, who had a clause in his contract preventing the Flames from moving him to another team without his permission, had given the organization a list of four teams to which he would accept a trade: the Chicago Blackhawks, Los Angeles Kings, Boston Bruins or Pittsburgh Penguins. Amidst the trade rumours, Iginla scored the game-winning goal in what was ultimately his last home game as a Flame, a 3–2 victory over the St. Louis Blues on March 24.

The Flames held Iginla out of their March 27 game against the Colorado Avalanche as a trade appeared imminent. Aaron Ward, an analyst for The Sports Network (TSN) reported via "multiple-sources" that Iginla had been dealt to the Bruins, however the Flames revealed following the game that he had instead been dealt to the Penguins in exchange for Pittsburgh's first round selection at the 2013 NHL entry draft and college prospects Kenneth Agostino and Ben Hanowski. Boston general manager Peter Chiarelli was left disappointed as he believed he had completed a deal earlier in the day. However, Feaster later told Chiarelli that Iginla preferred Pittsburgh, and that the team honoured his wishes. Iginla stated that the opportunity to play alongside Sidney Crosby, with whom he teamed up to score the gold-medal winning goal at the 2010 Winter Olympics, was too important to pass up.

The deal marked the end of an era for the Flames. In his 17 years in Calgary, Iginla became the face of the franchise, and was considered the greatest player in the team's history. Iginla left Calgary as the franchise leader in games played (1,219), goals (525), points (1,095), multi-goal games (95) and game-winning goals (83).

=== Late season ===
Trade rumours followed Kiprusoff as well, despite his reluctance to leave Calgary following the birth of his second child. The Flames gave the Toronto Maple Leafs permission to speak with Kiprusoff's agent to see if the team could convince the goaltender to accept a trade. According to Feaster however, Kiprusoff told Toronto that "Miikka was clear that he didn't want to lead Toronto on, that he didn't want to go there if his heart wasn't 100 per cent set on it and committed to it", therefore the Flames agreed to honour Kiprusoff's request to remain in Calgary.

Without Iginla and top defenceman Jay Bouwmeester, who was dealt to the St. Louis Blues, the team continued to struggle, particularly on the road. The Flames set a franchise record for consecutive losses, enduring 13 consecutive defeats away from the Saddledome before ending the streak against the Colorado Avalanche with a 3–1 victory on April 8.

Following an embarrassing 8–2 loss on home ice to the Edmonton Oilers, the Flames' younger prospects asserted themselves in an April 13 game in Edmonton in which Sven Baertschi scored his first goal of the season and Max Reinhart the first of his NHL career to hand their provincial rivals a 4–1 defeat that practically eliminated the Oilers from playoff contention. Ben Hanowski, one of the players acquired in the Iginla trade, made his NHL debut late in the season following the conclusion of his college season, scoring a goal in his first game.

Kiprusoff's future was a late-season storyline, and while the goaltender himself refused to confirm or deny speculation it would be his last season in the NHL, his final home game of the season was viewed by the fans as a celebration of his career. The crowd chanted his name and gave him a long standing ovation following a 32-save performance in a 3–1 victory over the Anaheim Ducks.

A three-game road losing streak to end the season left the Flames with the sixth-worst record in the League. Finishing with a 19–25–4 record, the Flames placed fourth in the Northwest Division, 13th in the Western Conference and missed the playoffs for the fourth consecutive season.

Three Flames players joined the roster of their respective countries at the 2013 World Championship. Defenceman T. J. Brodie, who was praised by Head Coach Hartley as one of the team's top performers during the NHL season, joined Team Canada. Fellow defenceman Chris Butler played for Team USA, and forward Jiri Hudler played with the Czech Republic. Mikael Backlund, whose performance during the season was also praised, hoped to join the Swedish roster, but after playing the final games of the season despite a fractured foot, was not medically cleared to play in the World Championship.

=== Post-season ===
The Saddledome was flooded as part of the 2013 Alberta floods in mid June 2013, at the tail end of the Stanley Cup playoffs.

== Standings ==
Northwest Division
Pos	Team	GP	W	L	OTL	ROW	GF	GA	GD	Pts
1	y – Vancouver Canucks	48	26	15	7	21	127	121	+6	59
2	x – Minnesota Wild	48	26	19	3	22	122	127	−5	55
3	Edmonton Oilers	48	19	22	7	17	125	134	−9	45
4	Calgary Flames	48	19	25	4	19	128	160	−32	42
5	Colorado Avalanche	48	16	25	7	14	116	152	−36	39

Source: National Hockey League
x – Clinched playoff spot; y – Clinched division

Western Conference
Pos	Div	Team	GP	W	L	OTL	ROW	GF	GA	GD	Pts
1	CE	p – Chicago Blackhawks	48	36	7	5	30	155	102	+53	77
2	PA	y – Anaheim Ducks	48	30	12	6	24	140	118	+22	66
3	NW	y – Vancouver Canucks	48	26	15	7	21	127	121	+6	59
4	CE	x – St. Louis Blues	48	29	17	2	24	129	115	+14	60
5	PA	x – Los Angeles Kings	48	27	16	5	25	133	118	+15	59
6	PA	x – San Jose Sharks	48	25	16	7	17	124	116	+8	57
7	CE	x – Detroit Red Wings	48	24	16	8	22	124	115	+9	56
8	NW	x – Minnesota Wild	48	26	19	3	22	122	127	−5	55
9	CE	Columbus Blue Jackets	48	24	17	7	19	120	119	+1	55
10	PA	Phoenix Coyotes	48	21	18	9	17	125	131	−6	51
11	PA	Dallas Stars	48	22	22	4	20	130	142	−12	48
12	NW	Edmonton Oilers	48	19	22	7	17	125	134	−9	45
13	NW	Calgary Flames	48	19	25	4	19	128	160	−32	42
14	CE	Nashville Predators	48	16	23	9	14	111	139	−28	41
15	NW	Colorado Avalanche	48	16	25	7	14	116	152	−36	39

Source: National Hockey League
p – Clinched Presidents' Trophy; x – Clinched playoff spot; y – Clinched division

== Schedule and results ==
=== Regular season ===
2012–13 Game log

January: 1–3–1 (Home: 1–3–0; Road: 0–0–1)
#	Date	Visitor	Score	Home	OT	Decision	Attendance	Record	Pts
1	January 20	San Jose	4–1	Calgary		Kiprusoff	19,289	0–1–0	0
2	January 21	Anaheim	5–4	Calgary		Kiprusoff	19,289	0–2–0	0
3	January 23	Calgary	2–3	Vancouver	SO	Kiprusoff	19,810	0–2–1	1
4	January 26	Edmonton	3–4	Calgary		Kiprusoff	19,289	1–2–1	3
5	January 31	Colorado	6–3	Calgary		Kiprusoff	19,289	1–3–1	3

February: 6–5–3 (Home: 3–2–2; Road: 3–3–1)
#	Date	Visitor	Score	Home	OT	Decision	Attendance	Record	Pts
6	February 2	Chicago	3–2	Calgary	SO	Kiprusoff	19,289	1–3–2	4
7	February 5	Calgary	4–1	Detroit		Kiprusoff	20,066	2–3–2	6
8	February 7	Calgary	4–3	Columbus	OT	Irving	10,484	3–3–2	8
9	February 9	Calgary	1–5	Vancouver		Irving	18,910	3–4–2	8
10	February 11	Minnesota	2–1	Calgary	SO	Irving	19,289	3–4–3	9
11	February 13	Dallas	4–7	Calgary		Irving	19,289	4–4–3	11
12	February 15	St. Louis	5–2	Calgary		MacDonald	19,289	4–5–3	11
13	February 17	Calgary	4–3	Dallas		MacDonald	17,340	5–5–3	13
14	February 18	Calgary	0–4	Phoenix		Taylor	17,208	5–6–3	13
15	February 20	Los Angeles	3–1	Calgary		MacDonald	19,289	5–7–3	13
16	February 23	Minnesota	1–3	Calgary		MacDonald	19,289	6–7–3	15
17	February 24	Phoenix	4–5	Calgary		MacDonald	19,289	7–7–3	17
18	February 26	Calgary	1–2	Minnesota	OT	MacDonald	18,703	7–7–4	18
19	February 28	Calgary	4–5	Colorado		MacDonald	15,197	7–8–4	18

March: 6–8–0 (Home: 6–1–0; Road: 0–7–0)
#	Date	Visitor	Score	Home	OT	Decision	Attendance	Record	Pts
20	March 3	Vancouver	2–4	Calgary		Taylor	19,289	8–8–4	20
21	March 6	San Jose	1–4	Calgary		Kiprusoff	19,289	9–8–4	22
22	March 8	Calgary	0–4	Anaheim		Kiprusoff	15,839	9–9–4	22
23	March 9	Calgary	2–6	Los Angeles		Kiprusoff	18,248	9–10–4	22
24	March 11	Calgary	1–3	Los Angeles		MacDonald	18,118	9–11–4	22
25	March 13	Detroit	2–5	Calgary		Kiprusoff	19,289	10–11–4	24
26	March 15	Nashville	3–6	Calgary		Kiprusoff	19,289	11–11–4	26
27	March 18	Calgary	3–4	Dallas		MacDonald	16,057	11–12–4	26
28	March 21	Calgary	3–5	Nashville		Kiprusoff	17,113	11–13–4	26
29	March 22	Calgary	1–5	Columbus		Kiprusoff	13,853	11–14–4	26
30	March 24	St. Louis	2–3	Calgary		Kiprusoff	19,289	12–14–4	28
31	March 26	Calgary	0–2	Chicago		Kiprusoff	21,790	12–15–4	28
32	March 27	Colorado	3–4	Calgary		MacDonald	19,289	13–15–4	30
33	March 29	Columbus	6–4	Calgary		Kiprusoff	19,289	13–16–4	30

April: 7–8–0 (Home: 4–2–0; Road: 3–6–0)
#	Date	Visitor	Score	Home	OT	Decision	Attendance	Record	Pts
34	April 1	Calgary	1–4	Edmonton		Kiprusoff	16,839	13–17–4	30
35	April 3	Edmonton	8–2	Calgary		MacDonald	19,289	13–18–4	30
36	April 5	Calgary	1–2	San Jose		Kiprusoff	17,562	13–19–4	30
37	April 6	Calgary	2–5	Vancouver		Kiprusoff	18,910	13–20–4	30
38	April 8	Calgary	3–1	Colorado		MacDonald	13,444	14–20–4	32
39	April 10	Vancouver	4–1	Calgary		Kiprusoff	19,289	14–21–4	32
40	April 12	Phoenix	2–3	Calgary	OT	MacDonald	19,289	15–21–4	34
41	April 13	Calgary	4–1	Edmonton		MacDonald	16,839	16–21–4	36
42	April 15	Minnesota	4–3	Calgary		MacDonald	19,289	16–22–4	36
43	April 17	Detroit	2–3	Calgary		Kiprusoff	19,289	17–22–4	38
44	April 19	Anaheim	1–3	Calgary		Kiprusoff	19,289	18–22–4	40
45	April 21	Calgary	4–1	Minnesota		MacDonald	19,039	19–22–4	42
46	April 23	Calgary	3–4	Nashville		Kiprusoff	17,113	19–23–4	42
47	April 25	Calgary	1–4	St. Louis		MacDonald	15,302	19–24–4	42
48	April 26	Calgary	1–3	Chicago		MacDonald	22,048	19–25–4	42

Legend: Win (2 points) Loss (0 points) Overtime/shootout loss (1 point)

== Player statistics ==
- Final stats *

=== Skaters ===
Note: GP = Games played; G = Goals; A = Assists; Pts = Points; +/− = Plus/minus; PIM = Penalty minutes

Regular season

Player	GP	G	A	Pts	+/−	PIM
Michael Cammalleri	44	13	19	32	−15	25
Lee Stempniak	47	9	23	32	+2	12
Alex Tanguay	40	11	16	27	−13	22
Jiri Hudler	42	10	17	27	−13	22
Curtis Glencross	40	15	11	26	−8	18
Matt Stajan	43	5	18	23	+7	26
Dennis Wideman	46	6	16	22	−9	12
Jarome Iginla^{‡}	31	9	13	22	−7	22
Roman Cervenka	39	9	8	17	−13	14
Mikael Backlund	32	8	8	16	−6	29
Mark Giordano	47	4	11	15	−7	40
Jay Bouwmeester^{‡}	33	6	9	15	−11	16
T. J. Brodie	47	2	12	14	−9	8
Sven Baertschi	20	3	7	10	0	6
Steve Begin	36	4	4	8	−2	22
Chris Butler	44	1	7	8	−10	19
Roman Horak	20	2	5	7	−5	2
Blake Comeau^{‡}	33	4	3	7	−9	14
Tim Jackman	42	1	4	5	−9	76
Brian McGrattan^{†}	19	3	0	3	−4	49
Mark Cundari	4	1	2	3	−2	2
Max Reinhart	11	1	2	3	−3	4
Cory Sarich	28	0	2	2	−8	16
Ben Hanowski	5	1	0	1	0	0
Paul Byron	4	0	1	1	−2	2
Ben Street	6	0	1	1	−1	0
Anton Babchuk	7	0	1	1	−1	0
Brett Carson	10	0	1	1	−1	0
Blair Jones	15	0	1	1	−6	10
Derek Smith	22	0	1	1	−5	10
Carter Bancks	2	0	0	0	0	0
Akim Aliu	5	0	0	0	−2	14

=== Goaltenders ===
Note: GP = Games played; TOI = Time on ice (minutes); W = Wins; L = Losses; OT = Overtime losses; GA = Goals against; GAA= Goals against average; SA= Shots against; SV= Saves; Sv% = Save percentage; SO= Shutouts

Regular season

Player	GP	TOI	W	L	OT	GA	GAA	SA	Sv%	SO	G	A	PIM
Miikka Kiprusoff	24	1344:05	8	14	2	77	3.44	650	.882	0	0	1	0
Joey MacDonald	21	1148:28	8	9	1	55	2.87	507	.902	0	0	0	0
Leland Irving	6	270:04	2	1	1	15	3.33	128	.883	0	0	1	0
Daniel Taylor	2	120:00	1	1	0	6	3.00	68	.912	0	0	0	0

^{†}Denotes player spent time with another organization before joining Flames. Stats reflect time with the Flames only.
^{‡}Traded mid-season

== Awards and honours ==
=== Awards ===
Player	Award
Team awards
Matt Stajan	Ralph T. Scurfield Humanitarian Award
Lee Stempniak	J. R. "Bud" McCaig Award

=== Milestones ===
Player	Milestone	Reached
Miikka Kiprusoff	600th NHL game	January 20, 2013
Roman Cervenka	1st NHL game	January 26, 2013
Roman Cervenka	1st NHL point (assist)	January 31, 2013
Alex Tanguay	500th NHL assist	February 2, 2013
Roman Cervenka	1st NHL goal	February 7, 2013
Leland Irving	1st NHL point (assist)	February 7, 2013
Ben Street	1st NHL game	February 9, 2013
Mark Giordano	100th NHL assist	February 13, 2013
Michael Cammalleri	200th NHL goal	February 13, 2013
Jarome Iginla	1,200th NHL game	February 15, 2013
Curtis Glencross	100th NHL goal	February 15, 2013
Steve Begin	500th NHL game	February 24, 2013
Curtis Glencross	100th NHL assist 200th NHL point	February 24, 2013
Danny Taylor	1st NHL win	March 3, 2013
Max Reinhart	1st NHL game	April 6, 2013
Max Reinhart	1st NHL point (assist)	April 10, 2013
Max Reinhart	1st NHL goal	April 13, 2013
Ben Hanowski	1st NHL game 1st NHL goal	April 15, 2013
Mark Cundari	1st NHL game 1st NHL goal	April 21, 2013
Ben Street	1st NHL point (assist)	April 25, 2013

== Transactions ==
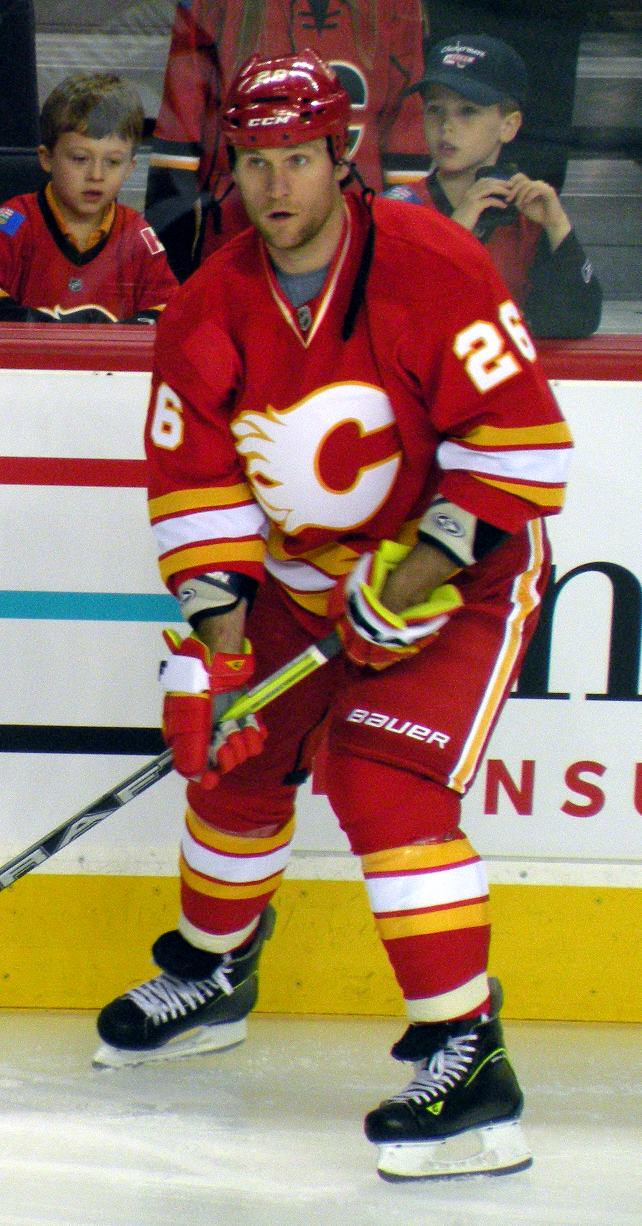
The Flames acquired Dennis Wideman in a trade with the Washington Capitals.

=== Player re-signings ===
Player	Date	Contract terms (in US dollars)
Blake Comeau	June 27, 2012	One year, $1.25 million
Blair Jones	June 29, 2012	Two year, $1.3 million
Lee Stempniak	June 29, 2012	Two year, $5 million
Cory Sarich	June 29, 2012	Two year, $4 million
Akim Aliu	July 4, 2012	One year, $695,000 (two-way)
Paul Byron	July 4, 2012	One year, $585,000 (two-way)
Mikael Backlund	July 5, 2012	One year, $725,000
Leland Irving	July 27, 2012	One year, $687,500 (two-way)

=== Trades ===
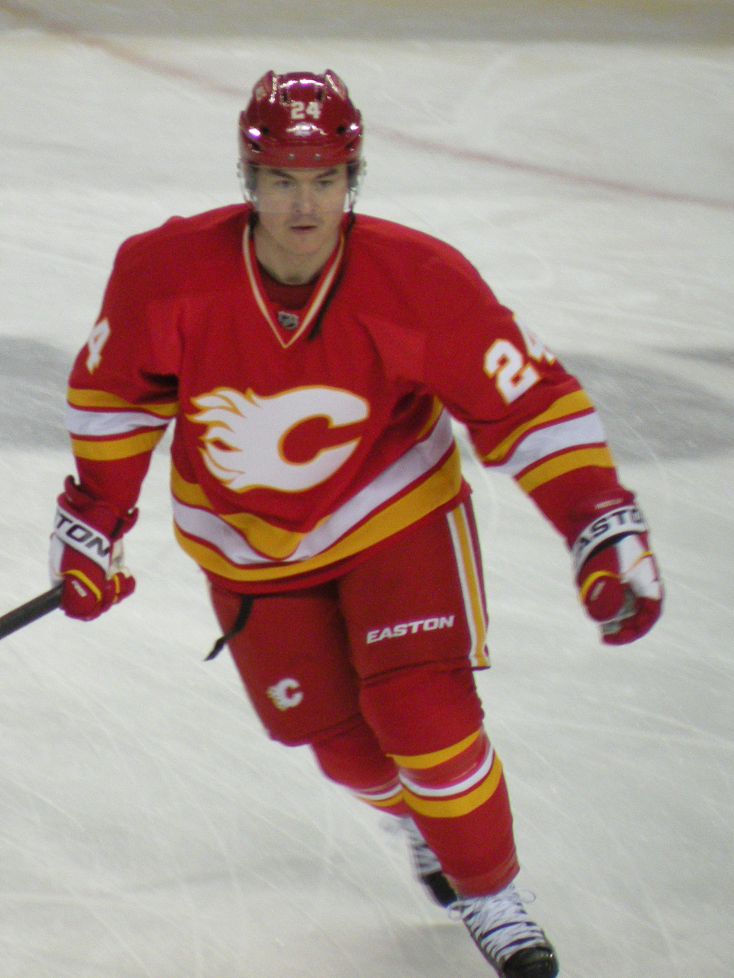
Jiri Hudler was signed as a free agent from Detroit

June 22, 2012	To Calgary Flames 1st-round pick (21st overall) in 2012; 2nd-round pick (42nd overall) in 2012	To Buffalo Sabres 1st-round pick (14th overall) in 2012
June 27, 2012	To Calgary Flames Dennis Wideman	To Washington Capitals Jordan Henry; 5th-round pick in 2013
January 21, 2013	To Calgary Flames 7th-round pick in 2013	To Chicago Blackhawks Henrik Karlsson
February 25, 2013	To Calgary Flames Mike Testwuide	To Philadelphia Flyers Mitch Wahl
February 28, 2013	To Calgary Flames Brian McGrattan	To Nashville Predators Joe Piskula
March 27, 2013	To Calgary Flames Kenny Agostino; Ben Hanowski; 1st-round pick in 2013	To Pittsburgh Penguins Jarome Iginla
April 1, 2013	To Calgary Flames Mark Cundari; Reto Berra; 1st-round pick in 2013	To St. Louis Blues Jay Bouwmeester
April 3, 2013	To Calgary Flames 5th-round pick in 2013	To Columbus Blue Jackets Blake Comeau

=== Additions and subtractions ===
Additions
Player	Former team	Via
Roman Cervenka	Avangard Omsk (KHL)	Free agency
Jiri Hudler	Detroit Red Wings	Free agency
Danny Taylor	Abbotsford Heat	Free agency
Joey MacDonald	Detroit Red Wings	Waivers

Subtractions
Player	New team	Via
Raitis Ivanans	Dinamo Riga (KHL)	Free agency
David Moss	Phoenix Coyotes	Free agency
Olli Jokinen	Winnipeg Jets	Free agency
Guillaume Desbiens	Vancouver Canucks	Free agency
Clay Wilson	HC Donbass (KHL)	Contract terminated
Scott Hannan	Nashville Predators	Free agency

== Draft picks ==
The Flames entered the 2012 NHL entry draft with the 14th overall pick. They did not use it, instead trading the pick to the Buffalo Sabres for their first round selection, 21st overall, and a second round selection, 42nd overall. With the 21st overall pick, the Flames chose centre Mark Jankowski from Stanstead College, in Quebec's high school program. The pick was considered "off the board", as Calgary selected Jankowski much higher than scouts predicted. Jankowksi's rating by scouting services had been rising however, and the Flames were convinced that he would not be available to them when they made their second round selection. Assistant general manager John Weisbrod, who made the pick, said Jankowski was the most physically talented player available in the draft, while general manager Jay Feaster predicted that he could become the best player taken in the draft.

Rnd	Pick	Player	Nat	Pos	Team (league)	NHL statistics				
Rnd	Pick	Player	Nat	Pos	Team (league)	GP	G	A	Pts	PIM
1	21^{[a]}	Mark Jankowski	Canada	C	Stanstead College (Canada HS-QC)					
2	42^{[b]}	Patrick Sieloff	United States	D	U.S. National Team Development Program (USHL)					
3	75	Jon Gillies	United States	G	Indiana Ice (USHL)					
4	105	Brett Kulak^{†}	Canada	D	Vancouver Giants (WHL)	1	0	0	0	2
5	124^{[c]}	Ryan Culkin	Canada	D	Quebec Remparts (QMJHL)					
6	165	Coda Gordon	Canada	LW	Swift Current Broncos (WHL)					
7	186^{[d]}	Matthew Deblouw	United States	C	Muskegon Lumberjacks (USHL)					

Statistics are updated to the end of the 2014–15 NHL season. ^{†} denotes player was on an NHL roster in 2014–15.

== Abbotsford Heat ==
The Flames' top minor league affiliate, the Abbotsford Heat of the American Hockey League (AHL) finished the 2012–13 season with a 34–32–4–6 record and failed to qualify for the Calder Cup playoffs. Goaltender Barry Brust set an AHL record by playing 268 minutes, 17 seconds without allowing a goal, breaking the previous mark of 249:51 set in 1957 by Johnny Bower.

The future of the franchise in Abbotsford was the subject of speculation during the season as the Heat lost $1.9 million during the season and finished 28th of 30 teams in attendance. The losses by the team reached nearly $5.5 million in the four years of the Heat's existence. Efforts, driven by the Vancouver Canucks, were made to see the Canucks purchase an AHL affiliate and move it into Abbotsford, while the Flames' affiliate would relocate to Utica, New York. The City of Abbotsford, however, was unable to complete a deal with the Canucks that would allow for the switch in time for the 2013–14 AHL season. As a consequence, the Flames' affiliation was left unchanged.
