= 2012–13 St. Louis Blues season =

National Hockey League team season

2012–13 St. Louis Blues
- Division: 2nd Central
- Conference: 4th Western
- 2012–13 record: 29–17–2
- Home record: 15–8–1
- Road record: 14–9–1
- Goals for: 129
- Goals against: 115

Team information
- General manager: Doug Armstrong
- Coach: Ken Hitchcock
- Captain: David Backes
- Alternate captains: Barret Jackman; Jamie Langenbrunner (Oct.–Feb.); Andy McDonald; Alex Pietrangelo (Feb.–May.); Alexander Steen
- Arena: Scottrade Center
- Average attendance: 414,328 avg. 17,263 (90.1%); 24 games

Team leaders
- Goals: Chris Stewart (18)
- Assists: David Backes (22)
- Points: Chris Stewart (36)
- Penalty minutes: Ryan Reaves (79)
- Plus/minus: Barret Jackman (+6)
- Wins: Brian Elliott (14)
- Goals against average: Jaroslav Halak (2.14)

The 2012–13 St. Louis Blues season was the 46th season for the National Hockey League (NHL) franchise that was established on June 5, 1967. The regular season was reduced from its usual 82 games to 48 due to the 2012–13 NHL lockout.

== Off-season ==
On January 6, 2013, after a 113-day lockout, the NHL Owners and Players reached a new Collective Bargaining Agreement (CBA), ratified on both sides by January 12, 119-days after the lockout. The old CBA expired on September 15, 2012, precipitating the lockout of the players by the owners. The new CBA has to be ratified by both the owners and players before the season can begin. On the same day, team owner Tom Stillman released a statement apologizing to the fans for the more-than-three-month lockout.

The Blues and the NHL released the new playing schedules for 2013, covering 48 games instead of the usual 82. The Blues open the season at home on January 19 against the Detroit Red Wings.

Fox Sports Midwest will broadcast 41 of the 48 games. NBC/NBC Sports will broadcast the remaining seven.

On the eve of the start of the abbreviated 2012–13 season on January 19, the Blues trimmed their roster to 23 by the January 18 deadline.

== Regular season ==
=== January ===
The first game of the 48-game season scored a first for the Blues: the first shutout in the first game of the season in their 46-year history. A 6–0 shutout of Detroit at home by Jaroslav Halak (14th with the Blues; facing only 14 shots) featured a two-goal game on his first two NHL shots by acclaimed Russian rookie Vladimir Tarasenko, two goals by Chris Stewart and a short-handed goal by T. J. Oshie, with four of the six goals on the power-play, to a standing-room-only crowd of 20,035 in attendance.

The opening game was the highest-rated Blues season or home opener on FOX Sports Midwest. It averaged a 6.0 household rating, making it the highest-rated program in prime time in St. Louis on Saturday.

The second game of the season, on Monday January 21 against the Nashville Predators, was the highest-rated regular season Blues telecast ever on FOX Sports Midwest. The Blues' 4–3 shootout win at Nashville generated a 7.4 household rating in the St. Louis DMA, according to Nielsen Media Research. That easily tops the previous regular season high of 6.3 set March 13, 2012 at Chicago. The Monday telecast peaked at a 9.1 rating (113,000 households) during the shootout. The Blues Live postgame show followed with an impressive 4.7 rating.

On January 27, the Blues honored the late St. Louis Cardinals' baseball Hall of Famer Stan Musial, who died in Ladue, Missouri, on January 19 at the age of 92. The Blues wore number 6 (Musial's number) on their warmup jerseys that were autographed and then auctioned to benefit Cardinals Care and the St. Louis Blues 14 fund.

=== February ===
On February 4, Blues' forward Vladimir Tarasenko was named by the NHL as January's Rookie of the Month, as he led all rookie forwards with nine points (five goals and four assists) in seven games in the month.

On February 13, goaltender Jake Allen made his first start in goal, against the Detroit Red Wings at Joe Louis Arena, where his team beat Detroit 4–3 in overtime, stopping 15 of 18 shots.

Vladimir Tarasenko was the early favorite to win the Calder Memorial Trophy as Rookie of the Year after the one-quarter mark (12 games) of the season, scoring six goals and five assists (11 points) in 13 games, playing only 14:27 average per game. On February 22, he was placed on the injured reserve list after getting hit on the head in the February 20 game in Colorado. His five points in his first two games tied him with Wayne Babych for the best start by a rookie in Blues' history.

On February 23 at home, Barret Jackman became the all-time Blues' leader in games played by a defenseman with his 616th game played since his debut on April 14, 2002. He has 22 goals and 121 assists for 143 points in his career and a plus-minus rating of +37. This season, he passed Bob Plager (615), Barclay Plager (614), Al MacInnis (613), Larry Patey (603) and Chris Pronger (598). Only forwards Bernie Federko (927), Brian Sutter (779), Brett Hull (744) and Garry Unger (662) have played in more games than Jackman.

After starting out with a 6–1 record in January, the Blues skidded to a 4–7–1 record in February, with a 1–5–1 record at home; in that span, they scored only 11 goals while giving up 26.

=== March ===
Rookie goaltender Jake Allen earned his first NHL shutout at home against the Phoenix Coyotes, stopping all 28 shots on March 14. It boosted his record to 7–1 in his first eight games.

Goaltender Jaroslav Halak tied Glenn Hall for the Blues' franchise record of 16 career shutouts when Halak shut-out the Edmonton Oilers on March 23, stopping all 19 shots on net. It was his 25th career shutout in the NHL. Roman Turek is third on the franchise list with 13 shutouts.

A freefall at the end of March, losing four of five games, dropped the Blues to eighth place in the Conference, just barely hanging on to a playoff spot.

A few days before the NHL trade deadline (April 3), the Blues, on March 30, picked up a left-shooting defenseman Jordan Leopold in a trade with the Buffalo Sabres to bolster its defense.

=== April ===
In his second trade in two days, on April 1, general manager Doug Armstrong, after pushing for 10 months, finally acquired left-shooting defenseman Jay Bouwmeester from the Calgary Flames. In his final trade, his third in four days, just before the deadline on April 3, Armstrong traded defenseman Wade Redden to the Boston Bruins for a conditional seventh-round draft pick in 2014.

April 16 saw head coach Ken Hitchcock earn his 600th NHL win with the 2–1 shootout victory over the Vancouver Canucks. He became the 11th NHL coach to reach that milestone. Of the 11, only two have higher career point percentages: Scotty Bowman (.657) and Joel Quenneville (.612), with Hitchcock at .595. Ironically, Bowman and Quenneville were both former Blues' coaches.

The Blues clinched a playoff spot in the top eight teams in the Western Conference after their 3–1 home win against the Colorado Avalanche on April 23, giving them a 27–17–2 (56 points) record. Final seeding will depend on the result of their final two games of the season at home against the Calgary Flames and Chicago Blackhawks, with a chance for fourth place giving them home advantage in the first round. They reached the playoffs for 25 consecutive years from 1979 to 2004, and their third in the last eight seasons.

The team was 17–14–2 (36 points), sitting at ninth place in the Western Conference at the end of March, and were in danger of not making the playoffs. A 12–3 run in April, however, pushed them to fourth place and home ice in the first round of the playoffs against the Los Angeles Kings.

Goaltender Brian Elliott was named the NHL's Second Star of the Month for April, with his franchise-record (including post-season) 11 wins in the month. He had an 11–2–0 record, 1.28 goals against average and .948 save percentage, with three shutouts in 13 games, to push the Blues into fourth place.

The Blues tied the Vancouver Canucks for most shutouts for in the NHL, with seven.

=== May ===
After the Blues' first-round loss, their third playoff loss in four seasons, sportswriter Bernie Miklasz asked why the Blues are so easily satisfied. He previously wrote that the team was good, but just not good enough.

== Standings ==
Central Division
Pos	Team	GP	W	L	OTL	ROW	GF	GA	GD	Pts
1	p – Chicago Blackhawks	48	36	7	5	30	155	102	+53	77
2	x – St. Louis Blues	48	29	17	2	24	129	115	+14	60
3	x – Detroit Red Wings	48	24	16	8	22	124	115	+9	56
4	Columbus Blue Jackets	48	24	17	7	19	120	119	+1	55
5	Nashville Predators	48	16	23	9	14	111	139	−28	41

Source: National Hockey League
p – Clinched Presidents' Trophy; x – Clinched playoff spot

Western Conference
Pos	Div	Team	GP	W	L	OTL	ROW	GF	GA	GD	Pts
1	CE	p – Chicago Blackhawks	48	36	7	5	30	155	102	+53	77
2	PA	y – Anaheim Ducks	48	30	12	6	24	140	118	+22	66
3	NW	y – Vancouver Canucks	48	26	15	7	21	127	121	+6	59
4	CE	x – St. Louis Blues	48	29	17	2	24	129	115	+14	60
5	PA	x – Los Angeles Kings	48	27	16	5	25	133	118	+15	59
6	PA	x – San Jose Sharks	48	25	16	7	17	124	116	+8	57
7	CE	x – Detroit Red Wings	48	24	16	8	22	124	115	+9	56
8	NW	x – Minnesota Wild	48	26	19	3	22	122	127	−5	55
9	CE	Columbus Blue Jackets	48	24	17	7	19	120	119	+1	55
10	PA	Phoenix Coyotes	48	21	18	9	17	125	131	−6	51
11	PA	Dallas Stars	48	22	22	4	20	130	142	−12	48
12	NW	Edmonton Oilers	48	19	22	7	17	125	134	−9	45
13	NW	Calgary Flames	48	19	25	4	19	128	160	−32	42
14	CE	Nashville Predators	48	16	23	9	14	111	139	−28	41
15	NW	Colorado Avalanche	48	16	25	7	14	116	152	−36	39

Source: National Hockey League
p – Clinched Presidents' Trophy; x – Clinched playoff spot; y – Clinched division

== Schedule and results ==
(all games on Fox Sports Midwest, except those on NBC/NBC Sports marked with a * )

- Blues' Schedule
- NBC/NBC Sports schedule

2012–13 Game Log

Legend:

Win (2 points) Loss (0 points) Overtime/shootout loss (1 point)

January: 6–1–0 (Home: 3–0–0; Road: 3–1–0)
#	Date	Visitor	Score	Home	OT	Decision	Attendance	Record	Pts	Recap
1	January 19	Detroit	0–6	St. Louis		Halak	20,035	1–0–0	2	StL 6, Det 0
2	January 21	St. Louis	4–3	Nashville	SO	Elliott	17,113	2–0–0	4	StL 4, Nsh 3 SO
3	January 22	St. Louis	2–3	Chicago		Elliott	21,455	2–1–0	4	Chi 3, StL 2
4	January 24	Nashville	0–3	St. Louis		Halak	16,047	3–1–0	6	StL 3, Nsh 0
5	January 26	St. Louis	4–3	Dallas		Halak	17,131	4–1–0	8	StL 4, Dal 3
6	January 27 *	Minnesota	4–5	St. Louis	OT	Elliott	18,265	5–1–0	10	StL 5, Min 4 OT
7	January 31	St. Louis	4–1	Columbus		Elliott	11,155	6–1–0	12	StL 4, CBJ 1

February: 4–7–1 (Home: 1–5–1; Road: 3–2–0)
#	Date	Visitor	Score	Home	OT	Decision	Attendance	Record	Pts	Recap
8	February 1	St. Louis	3–5	Detroit		Elliott	20,066	6–2–0	12	Det 5, StL 3
9	February 5	Nashville	6–1	St. Louis		Elliott	15,206	6–3–0	12	Nsh 6, StL 1
10	February 7	Detroit	5–1	St. Louis		Elliott	17,699	6–4–0	12	Det 5, StL 1
11	February 9	Anaheim	6–5	St. Louis	SO	Elliott	18,835	6–4–1	13	Ana 6, StL 5 SO
12	February 11	Los Angeles	4–1	St. Louis		Elliott	14,498	6–5–1	13	LAK 4, StL 1
13	February 13 *	St. Louis	4–3	Detroit	OT	Allen	20,066	7–5–1	15	StL 4, Det 3 OT
14	February 15	St. Louis	5–2	Calgary		Allen	19,289	8–5–1	17	StL 5, Cgy 2
15	February 17	St. Louis	4–3	Vancouver	SO	Allen	18,910	9–5–1	19	StL 4, Van 3 SO
16	February 19 *	San Jose	2–1	St. Louis		Allen	16,100	9–6–1	19	SJS 2, StL 1
17	February 20 *	St. Louis	0–1	Colorado	OT	Halak	14,651	9–6–2	20	Col 1, StL 0 OT
18	February 23	Columbus	1–2	St. Louis		Halak	19,457	10–6–2	22	StL 2, CBJ 1
19	February 28	Chicago	3–0	St. Louis		Halak	19,533	10–7–2	22	Chi 3, StL 0

March: 7–7–0 (Home: 4–2–0; Road: 3–5–0)
#	Date	Visitor	Score	Home	OT	Decision	Attendance	Record	Pts	Recap
20	March 1	Edmonton	2–4	St. Louis		Halak	19,476	11–7–2	24	StL 4, Edm 2
21	March 3	St. Louis	1–4	Dallas		Elliott	16,663	11–8–2	24	Dal 4, StL 1
22	March 5	St. Louis	4–6	Los Angeles		Halak	18,118	11–9–2	24	LAK 6, StL 4
23	March 7	St. Louis	6–3	Phoenix		Allen	11,482	12–9–2	26	StL 6, Phx 3
24	March 9	St. Louis	4–3	San Jose	OT	Allen	17,562	13–9–2	28	StL 4, SJD 3 OT
25	March 10	St. Louis	2–4	Anaheim		Halak	17,174	13–10–2	28	Ana 4, StL 2
26	March 12	San Jose	2–4	St. Louis		Allen	16,583	14–10–2	30	StL 4, SJS 2
27	March 14	Phoenix	0–3	St. Louis		Allen	17,852	15–10–2	32	StL 3, Phx 0
28	March 16	Anaheim	1–2	St. Louis	OT	Allen	19,593	16–10–2	34	StL 2, Ana 1 OT
29	March 19	St. Louis	2–3	Vancouver		Allen	18,910	16–11–2	34	Van 3, StL 2
30	March 23	St. Louis	3–0	Edmonton		Halak	16,839	17–11–2	36	StL 3, Edm 0
31	March 24	St. Louis	2–3	Calgary		Halak	19,289	17–12–2	36	Cgy 3, StL 2
32	March 26	Edmonton	3–0	St. Louis		Allen	17,260	17–13–2	36	Edm 3, StL 0
33	March 28	Los Angeles	4–2	St. Louis		Halak	19,770	17–14–2	36	LAK 4, StL 2

April: 12–3–0 (Home: 7–1–0; Road: 5–2–0)
#	Date	Visitor	Score	Home	OT	Decision	Attendance	Record	Pts	Recap
34	April 1	St. Louis	4–1	Minnesota		Elliott	18,786	18–14–2	38	StL 4, Min 1
35	April 4	St. Louis	4–3	Chicago	SO	Elliott	22,081	19–14–2	40	StL 4, Chi 3 SO
36	April 5	Columbus	1–3	St. Louis		Allen	19,224	20–14–2	42	StL 3, CBJ 1
37	April 7 *	St. Louis	1–0	Detroit		Elliott	20,066	21–14–2	44	StL 1, Det 0
38	April 9	St. Louis	1–0	Nashville		Elliott	15,063	22–14–2	46	StL 1, Nsh 0
39	April 11	St. Louis	2–0	Minnesota		Elliott	18,947	23–14–2	48	StL 2, Min 0
40	April 12	St. Louis	1–4	Columbus		Allen	17,007	23–15–2	48	CBJ 4, StL 1
41	April 14 *	Chicago	2–0	St. Louis		Elliott	19,385	23–16–2	48	Chi 2, StL 0
42	April 16	Vancouver	1–2	St. Louis	SO	Elliott	17,709	24–16–2	50	StL 2, Van 1 SO
43	April 18	Phoenix	1–2	St. Louis	SO	Elliott	17,205	25–16–2	52	StL 2, Phx 1 SO
44	April 19	Dallas	1–2	St. Louis		Elliott	19,328	26–16–2	54	StL 2, Dal 1
45	April 21 *	St. Louis	3–5	Colorado		Elliott	14,606	26–17–2	54	Col 5, StL 3
46	April 23	Colorado	1–3	St. Louis		Elliott	15,427	27–17–2	56	StL 3, Col 1
47	April 25	Calgary	1–4	St. Louis		Elliott	15,302	28–17–2	58	StL 4, Cgy 1
48	April 27	Chicago	1–3	St. Louis		Elliott	19,841	29–17–2	60	StL 3, Chi 1

Legend: Win (2 points) Loss (0 points) Overtime/shootout loss (1 point)

=== Playoffs ===
Key: Win Loss

2013 Stanley Cup Playoffs

Western Conference Quarterfinals: vs. (5) Los Angeles Kings – Los Angeles won series 4–2
#	Date	Visitor	Score	Home	OT	Decision	Attendance	Series (STL–LAK)	Recap
1	April 30	Los Angeles	1–2	St. Louis	13:26	Elliott	17,612	1–0	StL 2, LAK 1 OT
2	May 2	Los Angeles	1–2	St. Louis		Elliott	18,681	2–0	StL 2, LAK 1
3	May 4	St. Louis	0–1	Los Angeles		Elliott	18,118	2–1	LAK 1, StL 0
4	May 6	St. Louis	3–4	Los Angeles		Elliott	18,334	2–2	LAK 4, StL 3
5	May 8	Los Angeles	3–2	St. Louis	8:00	Elliott	18,269	2–3	LAK 3, StL 2 OT
6	May 10	St. Louis	1–2	Los Angeles		Elliott	18,346	2–4	LAK 2, StL 1

== Player statistics ==
Final stats

Skaters

Regular season **FINAL**
Player	GP	G	A	Pts	+/-	PIM
Chris Stewart	48	**18**	18	**36**	0	40
David Backes	48	6	**22**	28	5	62
Alexander Steen	40	8	19	27	5	14
Patrik Berglund	48	17	8	25	−2	12
David Perron	48	10	15	25	0	44
Alex Pietrangelo	47	5	19	24	0	10
Kevin Shattenkirk	48	5	18	23	2	20
Andy McDonald	37	7	14	21	−2	16
T. J. Oshie	30	7	13	20	−5	15
Vladimir Sobotka	48	8	11	19	−4	35
Vladimir Tarasenko	38	8	11	19	1	10
Jaden Schwartz	45	7	6	13	−4	4
Barret Jackman	46	3	9	12	**6**	39
Chris Porter	29	2	6	8	5	0
Jay Bouwmeester^{†}	14	1	6	7	5	6
Kris Russell	33	1	6	7	**6**	9
Wade Redden ‡ (1/24-4/3)	23	2	3	5	−2	11
Roman Polak	48	1	5	6	−2	48
Adam Cracknell	20	2	4	6	3	4
Ryan Reaves	43	4	2	6	3	**79**
Jordan Leopold^{†}	15	0	2	2	−2	0
Matt D'Agostini ‡ ( -3/22)	16	1	1	2	−4	2
Jamie Langenbrunner + * (active 1/19-2/5)	4	0	1	1	1	0
Scott Nichol	30	1	0	1	−2	25
Ian Cole	15	0	1	1	−4	10
Andrew Murray	1	0	0	0	0	0
Dmitrij Jaskin	2	0	0	0	−1	0
Totals	48	124	210	334	4	531

2012–13 NHL season – Skater – Summary – Wins

* indicates not currently on the active roster.
^{+} indicates on Injured Reserve.
^{‡}Traded away mid-season, date of last game in ( ). Stats reflect time with Blues only.
^{†}Denotes player spent time with another team before joining Blues, date of first game in ( ). Stats reflect time with Blues only.
**Bold** = leading team in category.

Playoffs **FINAL**
Player	GP	G	A	Pts	+/-	PIM
Alexander Steen	6	3	0	3	2	6
David Backes	6	1	2	3	0	0
Vladimir Sobotka	6	0	3	3	4	0
Barret Jackman	6	1	1	2	−1	10
T. J. Oshie	6	2	0	2	−4	2
Patrik Berglund	6	1	1	2	−3	2
Kevin Shattenkirk	6	0	2	2	−1	6
David Perron	6	0	2	2	−3	6
Alex Pietrangelo	6	1	1	2	2	2
Jay Bouwmeester	6	0	1	1	0	0
Chris Porter	6	1	0	1	0	0
Roman Polak	6	0	1	1	−2	2
Chris Stewart	6	0	1	1	0	0
Jaden Schwartz	6	0	1	1	1	2
Jordan Leopold	6	0	0	0	−2	0
Andy McDonald	6	0	0	0	0	0
Adam Cracknell	5	0	0	0	−1	0
Ryan Reaves	6	0	0	0	−1	2
Vladimir Tarasenko	1	0	0	0	0	0
Totals	6	10	16	26	−9	40

== Goaltenders ==
(through game on April 27, 2013) FINAL

Regular season
Player	GP	GS	TOI	W	L	OT	GA	GAA	SA	SV%	SO	G	A	PIM
Brian Elliott	24	20	1,291:56	14	8	1	49	2.28	526	.907	3	0	0	0
Jaroslav Halak	16	15	812:35	6	5	1	29	2.14	286	.899	3	0	1	0
Jake Allen	15	13	803:53	9	4	0	33	2.46	346	.905	1	0	0	0
Totals		48	2,908:24	29	17	2	111	2.29	1,158	.904	7	0	1	0

(through game on May 10, 2013) FINAL

Playoffs
Player	GP	GS	TOI	W	L	OT	GA	GAA	SA	SV%	SO	G	A	PIM
Brian Elliott	6	6	378:29	2	4	1	12	1.90	149	.919	0	0	0	0

^{†}Denotes player spent time with another team before joining the Blues. Stats reflect time with the Blues only.
^{‡}Traded mid-season
Bold/italics denotes franchise record

== Awards and milestones ==
=== Awards ===
Regular Season
Player	Award	Awarded
Chris Stewart	NHL First Star of the Week	March 17, 2013
Jake Allen and Chris Stewart	NHL Hot List	March 17, 2013
Brian Elliott	NHL Second Star of the Week	April 7, 2013
Brian Elliott	NHL Second Star for April	April 29, 2013

=== Milestones ===
Regular Season
Player	Milestone	Reached
Jake Allen	1st Career NHL Shutout	March 14, 2013
David Backes	300th NHL Point	April 27, 2013

== Transactions ==
The Blues have been involved in the following transactions during the 2012–13 season

=== Trades ===
Date	Details
July 10, 2012	To Tampa Bay Lightning B. J. Crombeen; 5th-round pick in 2014	To St. Louis Blues 4th-round pick in 2013; 4th-round pick in 2014
February 19, 2013	To Nashville Predators Scott Ford	To St. Louis Blues Jani Lajunen
March 22, 2013	To New Jersey Devils Matt D'Agostini; Conditional 7th-round pick in 2015	To St. Louis Blues Conditional 4th or 5th-round pick in 2015 (Note: Condition satisfied to render pick 5th-round pick.)
March 30, 2013	To Buffalo Sabres 2nd-round pick in 2013; Conditional 5th-round pick in 2013 (Note: Condition satisfied.)	To St. Louis Blues Jordan Leopold
April 1, 2013	To Calgary Flames Mark Cundari; Reto Berra; Conditional 1st-round pick in 2013 (Note: Condition satisfied.)	To St. Louis Blues Jay Bouwmeester
April 3, 2013	To Boston Bruins Wade Redden	To St. Louis Blues Conditional 6th-round pick in 2014 (Note: Condition satisfied.)

=== Free agents signed ===
Player	Former team	Contract terms
Mike McKenna	Binghamton Senators	1 year, $525,000
Scott Ford	Milwaukee Admirals	1 year, $575,000
Taylor Chorney	Edmonton Oilers	1 year, $575,000
Jeff Woywitka	New York Rangers	1 year, $700,000
Andrew Murray	Detroit Red Wings	1 year, $600,000
Wade Redden	New York Rangers	1 year, $800,000 *

- $468,293 (pro-rated over 48 games)

=== Free agents lost ===
Player	New team	Contract terms
Carlo Colaiacovo	Detroit Red Wings	2 years, $5 million
Kent Huskins	Detroit Red Wings	1 year, $750,000

=== Claimed via waivers ===
Player	Former team	Date claimed off waivers

=== Lost via waivers ===
Player	New team	Date claimed off waivers
Anthony Peluso	Winnipeg Jets	January 16, 2013

=== Lost via retirement ===
Player	Date
Scott Nichol	June 5, 2013
Andy McDonald	June 6, 2013

=== Player signings ===
Player	Date	Contract terms
Chris Stewart	June 14, 2012	1 year, $3 million
Barret Jackman	June 18, 2012	3 years, $9.5 million
Scott Nichol	June 28, 2012	1 year, $650,000
David Perron	July 5, 2012	4 years, $15.25 million
Jamie Langenbrunner	July 10, 2012	1 year, $1.5 million
Anthony Peluso	July 16, 2012	1 year, $605,000
Chris Porter	July 16, 2012	1 year, $650,000
Brett Sonne	July 16, 2012	1 year, $660,000
T. J. Oshie	July 20, 2012	5 years, $20.875 million
Joel Edmundson	March 6, 2013	3 years, $2.2275 million entry-level contract
Yannick Veilleux	March 6, 2013	3 years, $2.025 million entry-level contract
Ryan Tesink	March 13, 2013	3 years, $1.87 million entry-level contract
Sergey Andronov	March 24, 2013	1 year, $627,500 entry-level contract
Dmitrij Jaskin	April 3, 2013	3 years, $2.41 million entry-level contract
Chris Porter	April 4, 2013	2 years, $1.35 million contract extension
Niklas Lundstrom	May 21, 2013	3 years, $1.9675 million entry-level contract
Adam Cracknell	May 25, 2013	1 year, $600,000
Ian Cole	May 28, 2013	2 years, $1.65 million
Taylor Chorney	June 18, 2013	1 year, $600,000
Patrik Berglund	June 25, 2013	1 year, $3.25 million
Kevin Shattenkirk	June 26, 2013	4 years, $17 million

== Draft picks ==
St. Louis' picks at the 2012 NHL entry draft in Pittsburgh, Pennsylvania, at the Consol Energy Center from June 22–23, 2012.

Round	Pick	Player	Position	Nationality	Team (League)
1	25	Jordan Schmaltz	D	United States	Green Bay Gamblers (USHL)
2	56	Samuel Kurker	RW	United States	St. John's Preparatory School (USHS-MA)
3	67 (from Anaheim)	Mackenzie MacEachern	LW	United States	Brother Rice High School (USHS-MI)
3	86	Colton Parayko	D	Canada	Fort McMurray Oil Barons (AJHL)
4	116	Nicholas Walters	D	Canada	Everett Silvertips (WHL)
5	146	Francois Tremblay	G	Canada	Val d'Or Foreurs (QMJHL)
6	176	Petteri Lindbohm	D	Finland	Jokerit U20 (Jr. A SM-liiga)
7	206	Tyrel Seaman	C	Canada	Brandon Wheat Kings (WHL)

== Farm teams ==
=== Peoria Rivermen ===
The Peoria (Illinois) Rivermen are the Blues American Hockey League affiliate in 2012–13.
On April 1, 2013, the Blues announced that the Vancouver Canucks on March 29 agreed to buy the Rivermen from the Blues, pending approval from the NHL. Details not available. It is expected the Blues will affiliate with the AHL's Chicago Wolves for the 2013–14 season. The Blues officially announced their affiliation with the Wolves on April 23, for at least three seasons. They play in the Allstate Arena in the Chicago suburb of Rosemont. The team was formerly affiliated with the Vancouver Canucks from 2011–2013, and the Atlanta Thrashers from 2001–2011. The swap was hard to take for the fans of the team, but the team's attendance was light, and the sponsorship not very strong. The team is one of the premier franchises in the AHL. The team's owner is Don Levin, coached by Scott Arniel, and their GM is Wendell Young.

=== Evansville IceMen ===
The Evansville IceMen are the Blues affiliate in the ECHL.

== See also ==
- 2012–13 NHL season
- St. Louis Blues seasons
- St. Louis (sports)
