= 2012–13 Chicago Blackhawks season =

National Hockey League team season

2012–13 Chicago Blackhawks
- Stanley Cup champions
- Presidents' Trophy winners
- Western Conference champions
- Central Division champions
- Division: 1st Central
- Conference: 1st Western
- 2012–13 record: 36–7–5
- Home record: 18–3–3
- Road record: 18–4–2
- Goals for: 155
- Goals against: 102

Team information
- General manager: Stan Bowman
- Coach: Joel Quenneville
- Captain: Jonathan Toews
- Alternate captains: Duncan Keith; Patrick Sharp
- Arena: United Center
- Average attendance: 21,775 (110.4%); Total: 522,619

Team leaders
- Goals: Patrick Kane; Jonathan Toews (23)
- Assists: Patrick Kane (32)
- Points: Patrick Kane (55)
- Penalty minutes: Brandon Bollig (51)
- Plus/minus: Jonathan Toews (+28)
- Wins: Corey Crawford (19)
- Goals against average: Corey Crawford; Ray Emery (1.94)

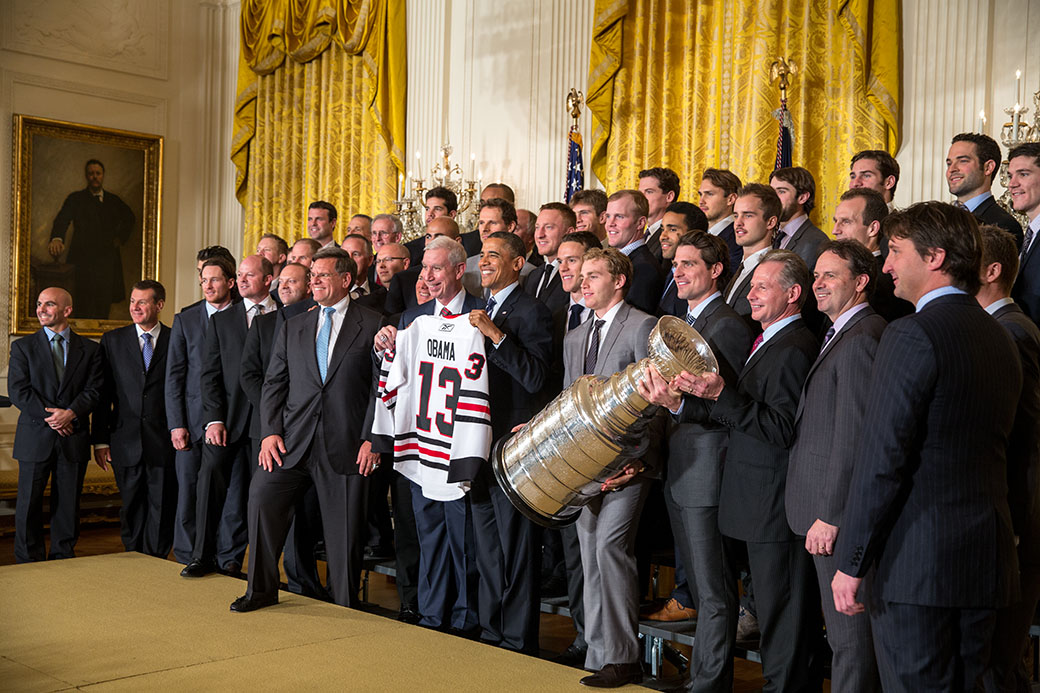
The 2013 Stanley Cup champion Blackhawks meet U.S. President Barack Obama.

The 2012–13 Chicago Blackhawks season was the 87th season for the National Hockey League (NHL) franchise that was established on September 25, 1926. The regular season was reduced from its usual 82 games to 48 due to a lockout. The Blackhawks captured the Western Conference championship and went on to defeat the Eastern Conference playoff champion Boston Bruins in six games to capture their fifth Stanley Cup in team history.

The Blackhawks became just the eighth team to win both the Cup and the Presidents' Trophy (as the team with the best regular season record) in the same season. As of 2026, they are the most recent Presidents' Trophy winner to even reach the Finals, let alone win the Stanley Cup. Chicago also became the first team to win multiple championships during the NHL's salary cap era. Chicago's Patrick Kane was awarded the Conn Smythe Trophy as the Most Valuable Player of the playoffs.

== Off-season ==
Sheldon Brookbank, and Michal Rozsival re-signed with the Chicago Blackhawks during the off-season. Sean O'Donnell, and Andrew Brunette retired. Rostislav Olesz, and Steve Montador both had a Compliance buyout. Blackhawks made a trade with the San Jose Sharks, as the Blackhawks got a 4th round 2012 draft pick, and a 7th round 2013 draft pick; in exchange the Sharks got a 4th round 2012 pick.

== Pre-season ==
Due to the 2012–13 NHL lockout, the NHL pre-season was cancelled.

== Regular season ==
The 48-game, shortened season was limited to conference and divisional games only. The Blackhawks did not play any teams from the Eastern Conference until they advanced to the 2013 Stanley Cup Finals against the Boston Bruins. The Blackhawks played three games each against non-divisional teams. Against their own division, the Blackhawks played four games against the Columbus Blue Jackets and Detroit Red Wings and five games against the Nashville Predators and St. Louis Blues.

On January 26 against the Columbus Blue Jackets, the Blackhawks tied a franchise record by starting the season 5–0–0 for the first time since the 1971–72 season. On the very next night, against the Detroit Red Wings, the Blackhawks set a new franchise record by starting the season 6–0–0. On February 19, against the Vancouver Canucks, the Blackhawks tied the NHL record set by the Anaheim Ducks in 2006–07 with a 16-game unbeaten streak to start the season, and beat the Ducks' record (28 points) by one point. On February 22 against the San Jose Sharks, the Blackhawks set a new NHL record with a 17-game unbeaten streak to start a season. On March 5 against the Minnesota Wild, the Blackhawks set a franchise record with a 10th consecutive win. The Blackhawks went on to extend both records for first consecutive games without a regulation loss (win or tie) to start a season and franchise record for most consecutive wins to 24 games (21–0–3) and 11 wins, respectively. On March 8 against the Colorado Avalanche, the Blackhawks' streak was snapped by a 6–2 loss.

On February 10 against the Nashville Predators, the Blackhawks recorded their first shutout since March 23, 2011, ending its shutout drought after 690 days. The Blackhawks proceeded to record seven shutouts during the season, tied for first in the league with the St. Louis Blues and Vancouver Canucks. On March 6 against the Colorado Avalanche, Ray Emery became the first goaltender in NHL history to start a season with 10 straight wins. Emery was also the first goaltender in franchise history to record 10 consecutive wins at any point in a season, overriding Glenn Hall's streak of nine straight from 1966–67. Emery extended both the NHL- and franchise-record to 12 wins (12–0–0) to start the season. The goaltending duo of Corey Crawford and Emery went on to capture the William M. Jennings Trophy for allowing an NHL-low 102 goals during the season. This was the franchise's fourth Jennings Trophy, with the previous three all captured by goaltending tandems featuring Ed Belfour.

As a result of the streak, the Blackhawks hold the second longest NHL record for most consecutive games earning a point at 30 games (24–0–6), a streak spanning two seasons, starting from March 27, 2012, of the 2011–12 season. The record stands behind the 1979–80 Philadelphia Flyers, which recorded a 35 consecutive game point streak of 25–0–10, all in a single season. The Blackhawks' streak also ranks third for most consecutive games point in a single season at 24 games (21–0–3), behind the 1977–78 Montreal Canadiens at 28 games (23–0–5).

On March 26 against the Calgary Flames, Head Coach Joel Quenneville received his 649th regular season coaching win, surpassing the previous record held by Ron Wilson. Quenneville finished the season with 660 regular season coaching wins, and is ranked sixth among coaches with the most regular season coaching wins, first among active coaches.

On April 7, with a 5–3 win against the Nashville Predators, the Blackhawks became the first team to clinch a playoff berth in the 2013 Stanley Cup playoffs, guaranteeing a seventh seed finish in the Western Conference. On April 12, with a 3–2 shootout win against the Detroit Red Wings, the Blackhawks won the Central Division and reserved a third seed finish in the Western Conference. On April 17, the Blackhawks clinched the number one seed of the Western Conference after the Anaheim Ducks lost to the Columbus Blue Jackets in overtime. On April 24, the Blackhawks clinched the franchise's second Presidents' Trophy in a 4–1 win over the Edmonton Oilers. The win guaranteed the Blackhawks home-ice advantage throughout the playoffs.

The United Center also recorded its 200th consecutive combined regular season and playoff Blackhawks sell-out streak on March 1 against the Columbus Blue Jackets, which began during the 2007–08 season with the game on March 30, 2008, also against the Blue Jackets.

Legend: Win (2 points) Loss (0 points) Overtime/shootout loss (1 point)

2012–13 Season

January: 6–0–1 (Home: 2–0–0; Road: 4–0–1) Pts. 13
#	Date	Opponent	Score	OT	Decision	Arena	Attendance	Record	Pts	Recap
1	January 19	@ Los Angeles Kings	5–2		Crawford	Staples Center	18,545	1–0–0	2	W1
2	January 20	@ Phoenix Coyotes	6–4		Emery	Jobing.com Arena	17,363	2–0–0	4	W2
3	January 22	St. Louis Blues	3–2		Crawford	United Center	21,455	3–0–0	6	W3
4	January 24	@ Dallas Stars	3–2	OT	Crawford	American Airlines Center	17,868	4–0–0	8	W4
5	January 26	@ Columbus Blue Jackets	3–2		Crawford	Nationwide Arena	18,381	5–0–0	10	W5
6	January 27	Detroit Red Wings	2–1	OT	Crawford	United Center	21,607	6–0–0	12	W6
7	January 30	@ Minnesota Wild	2–3	SO	Crawford	Xcel Energy Center	18,550	6–0–1	13	SOL1

February: 11–0–2 (Home: 6–0–1; Road: 5–0–1) Pts. 24
#	Date	Opponent	Score	OT	Decision	Arena	Attendance	Record	Pts	Recap
8	February 1	@ Vancouver Canucks	1–2	SO	Crawford	Rogers Arena	18,910	6–0–2	14	SOL2
9	February 2	@ Calgary Flames	3–2	SO	Emery	Scotiabank Saddledome	19,289	7–0–2	16	W1
10	February 5	@ San Jose Sharks	5–3		Crawford	HP Pavilion at San Jose	17,562	8–0–2	18	W2
11	February 7	@ Phoenix Coyotes	6–2		Emery	Jobing.com Arena	15,096	9–0–2	20	W3
12	February 10	@ Nashville Predators	3–0		Crawford	Bridgestone Arena	17,113	10–0–2	22	W4
13	February 12	Anaheim Ducks	2–3	SO	Crawford	United Center	21,188	10–0–3	23	SOL1
14	February 15	San Jose Sharks	4–1		Emery	United Center	21,824	11–0–3	25	W1
15	February 17	Los Angeles Kings	3–2		Emery	United Center	21,843	12–0–3	27	W2
16	February 19	Vancouver Canucks	4–3	SO	Emery	United Center	21,423	13–0–3	29	W3
17	February 22	San Jose Sharks	2–1		Emery	United Center	21,670	14–0–3	31	W4
18	February 24	Columbus Blue Jackets	1–0		Crawford	United Center	21,580	15–0–3	33	W5
19	February 25	Edmonton Oilers	3–2	OT	Emery	United Center	21,127	16–0–3	35	W6
20	February 28	@ St. Louis Blues	3–0		Crawford	Scottrade Center	19,533	17–0–3	37	W7

March: 9–5–0 (Home: 4–3–0; Road: 5–2–0) Pts. 18
#	Date	Opponent	Score	OT	Decision	Arena	Attendance	Record	Pts	Recap
21	March 1	Columbus Blue Jackets	4–3	OT	Emery	United Center	21,828	18–0–3	39	W8
22	March 3	@ Detroit Red Wings	2–1	SO	Crawford	Joe Louis Arena	20,066	19–0–3	41	W9
23	March 5	Minnesota Wild	5–3		Crawford	United Center	21,836	20–0–3	43	W10
24	March 6	Colorado Avalanche	3–2		Emery	United Center	21,531	21–0–3	45	W11
25	March 8	@ Colorado Avalanche	2–6		Crawford	Pepsi Center	18,007	21–1–3	45	L1
26	March 10	Edmonton Oilers	5–6		Crawford	United Center	22,020	21–2–3	45	L2
27	March 14	@ Columbus Blue Jackets	2–1	SO	Crawford	Nationwide Arena	15,009	22–2–3	47	W1
28	March 16	@ Dallas Stars	8–1		Crawford	American Airlines Center	18,584	23–2–3	49	W2
29	March 18	@ Colorado Avalanche	5–2		Emery	Pepsi Center	16,952	24–2–3	51	W3
30	March 20	@ Anaheim Ducks	2–4		Crawford	Honda Center	17,610	24–3–3	51	L1
31	March 25	Los Angeles Kings	4–5		Crawford	United Center	21,850	24–4–3	51	L2
32	March 26	Calgary Flames	2–0		Emery	United Center	21,790	25–4–3	53	W1
33	March 29	Anaheim Ducks	1–2		Emery	United Center	22,105	25–5–3	53	L1
34	March 31	@ Detroit Red Wings	7–1		Crawford	Joe Louis Arena	20,066	26–5–3	55	W1

April: 10–2–2 (Home: 6–0–2; Road: 4–2–0) Pts. 22
#	Date	Opponent	Score	OT	Decision	Arena	Attendance	Record	Pts	Recap
35	April 1	Nashville Predators	3–2	SO	Crawford	United Center	21,306	27–5–3	57	W2
36	April 4	St. Louis Blues	3–4	SO	Crawford	United Center	22,081	27–5–4	58	SOL1
37	April 6	@ Nashville Predators	1–0		Emery	Bridgestone Arena	17,256	28–5–4	60	W1
38	April 7	Nashville Predators	5–3		Emery	United Center	22,044	29–5–4	62	W2
39	April 9	@ Minnesota Wild	1–0		Emery	Xcel Energy Center	19,158	30–5–4	64	W3
40	April 12	Detroit Red Wings	3–2	SO	Crawford	United Center	22,191	31–5–4	66	W4
41	April 14	@ St. Louis Blues	2–0		Crawford	Scottrade Center	19,385	32–5–4	68	W5
42	April 15	Dallas Stars	5–2		Emery	United Center	21,986	33–5–4	70	W6
43	April 19	Nashville Predators	5–4	OT	Crawford	United Center	22,014	34–5–4	72	W7
44	April 20	Phoenix Coyotes	2–3	SO	Crawford	United Center	22,272	34–5–5	73	SOL1
45	April 22	@ Vancouver Canucks	1–3		Crawford	Rogers Arena	18,910	34–6–5	73	L1
46	April 24	@ Edmonton Oilers	4–1		Emery	Rexall Place	16,839	35–6–5	75	W1
47	April 26	Calgary Flames	3–1		Crawford	United Center	22,048	36–6–5	77	W2
48	April 27	@ St. Louis Blues	1–3		Hutton	Scottrade Center	19,841	36–7–5	77	L1

=== Standings ===
Central Division
Pos	Team	GP	W	L	OTL	ROW	GF	GA	GD	Pts
1	p – Chicago Blackhawks	48	36	7	5	30	155	102	+53	77
2	x – St. Louis Blues	48	29	17	2	24	129	115	+14	60
3	x – Detroit Red Wings	48	24	16	8	22	124	115	+9	56
4	Columbus Blue Jackets	48	24	17	7	19	120	119	+1	55
5	Nashville Predators	48	16	23	9	14	111	139	−28	41

Source: National Hockey League
p – Clinched Presidents' Trophy; x – Clinched playoff spot

Western Conference
Pos	Div	Team	GP	W	L	OTL	ROW	GF	GA	GD	Pts
1	CE	p – Chicago Blackhawks	48	36	7	5	30	155	102	+53	77
2	PA	y – Anaheim Ducks	48	30	12	6	24	140	118	+22	66
3	NW	y – Vancouver Canucks	48	26	15	7	21	127	121	+6	59
4	CE	x – St. Louis Blues	48	29	17	2	24	129	115	+14	60
5	PA	x – Los Angeles Kings	48	27	16	5	25	133	118	+15	59
6	PA	x – San Jose Sharks	48	25	16	7	17	124	116	+8	57
7	CE	x – Detroit Red Wings	48	24	16	8	22	124	115	+9	56
8	NW	x – Minnesota Wild	48	26	19	3	22	122	127	−5	55
9	CE	Columbus Blue Jackets	48	24	17	7	19	120	119	+1	55
10	PA	Phoenix Coyotes	48	21	18	9	17	125	131	−6	51
11	PA	Dallas Stars	48	22	22	4	20	130	142	−12	48
12	NW	Edmonton Oilers	48	19	22	7	17	125	134	−9	45
13	NW	Calgary Flames	48	19	25	4	19	128	160	−32	42
14	CE	Nashville Predators	48	16	23	9	14	111	139	−28	41
15	NW	Colorado Avalanche	48	16	25	7	14	116	152	−36	39

Source: National Hockey League
p – Clinched Presidents' Trophy; x – Clinched playoff spot; y – Clinched division

=== Detailed records ===
Western Conference
Opponent	Home	Away	Total	Pts.	Goals scored	Goals allowed
Central Division
Chicago Blackhawks	–	–	–	–	–	–
Columbus Blue Jackets	2–0–0	2–0–0	4–0–0	8	10	6
Detroit Red Wings	2–0–0	2–0–0	4–0–0	8	14	5
Nashville Predators	3–0–0	2–0–0	5–0–0	10	16	9
St. Louis Blues	1–0–1	2–1–0	3–1–1	7	12	9
	8–0–1	8–1–0	16–1–1	33	53	29
Northwest Division
Calgary Flames	2–0–0	1–0–0	3–0–0	6	8	3
Colorado Avalanche	1–0–0	1–1–0	2–1–0	4	10	10
Edmonton Oilers	1–1–0	1–0–0	2–1–0	4	12	9
Minnesota Wild	1–0–0	1–0–1	2–0–1	5	8	6
Vancouver Canucks	1–0–0	0–1–1	1–1–1	3	6	8
	6–1–0	4–2–2	10–3–2	22	44	36
Pacific Division
Anaheim Ducks	0–1–1	0–1–0	0–2–1	1	5	9
Dallas Stars	1–0–0	2–0–0	3–0–0	6	16	5
Los Angeles Kings	1–1–0	1–0–0	2–1–0	4	12	9
Phoenix Coyotes	0–0–1	2–0–0	2–0–1	5	14	9
San Jose Sharks	2–0–0	1–0–0	3–0–0	6	11	5
	4–2–2	6–1–0	10–3–2	22	58	37

== Playoffs ==
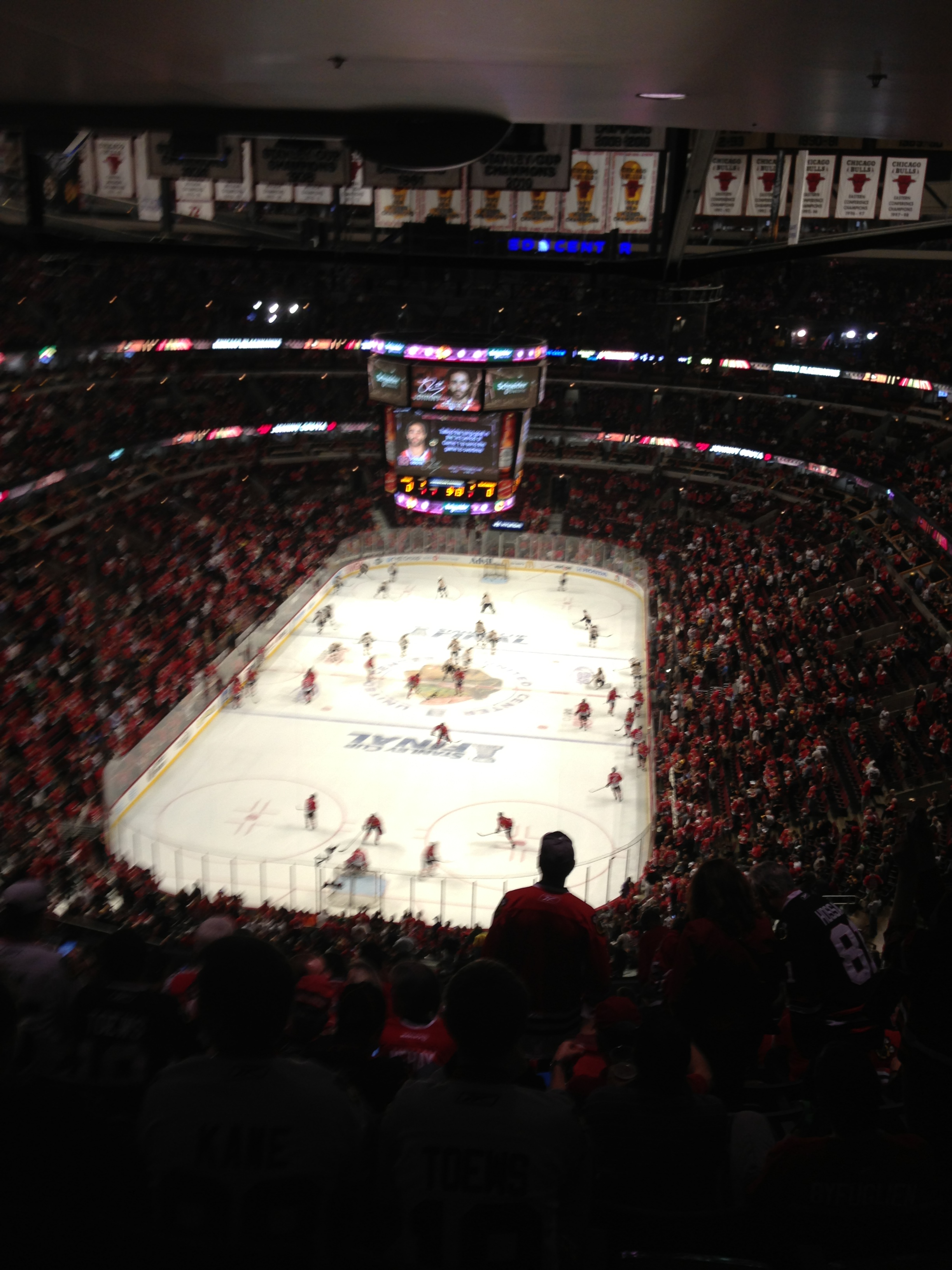
Just before Game 2 of the 2013 Stanley Cup Finals at United Center.

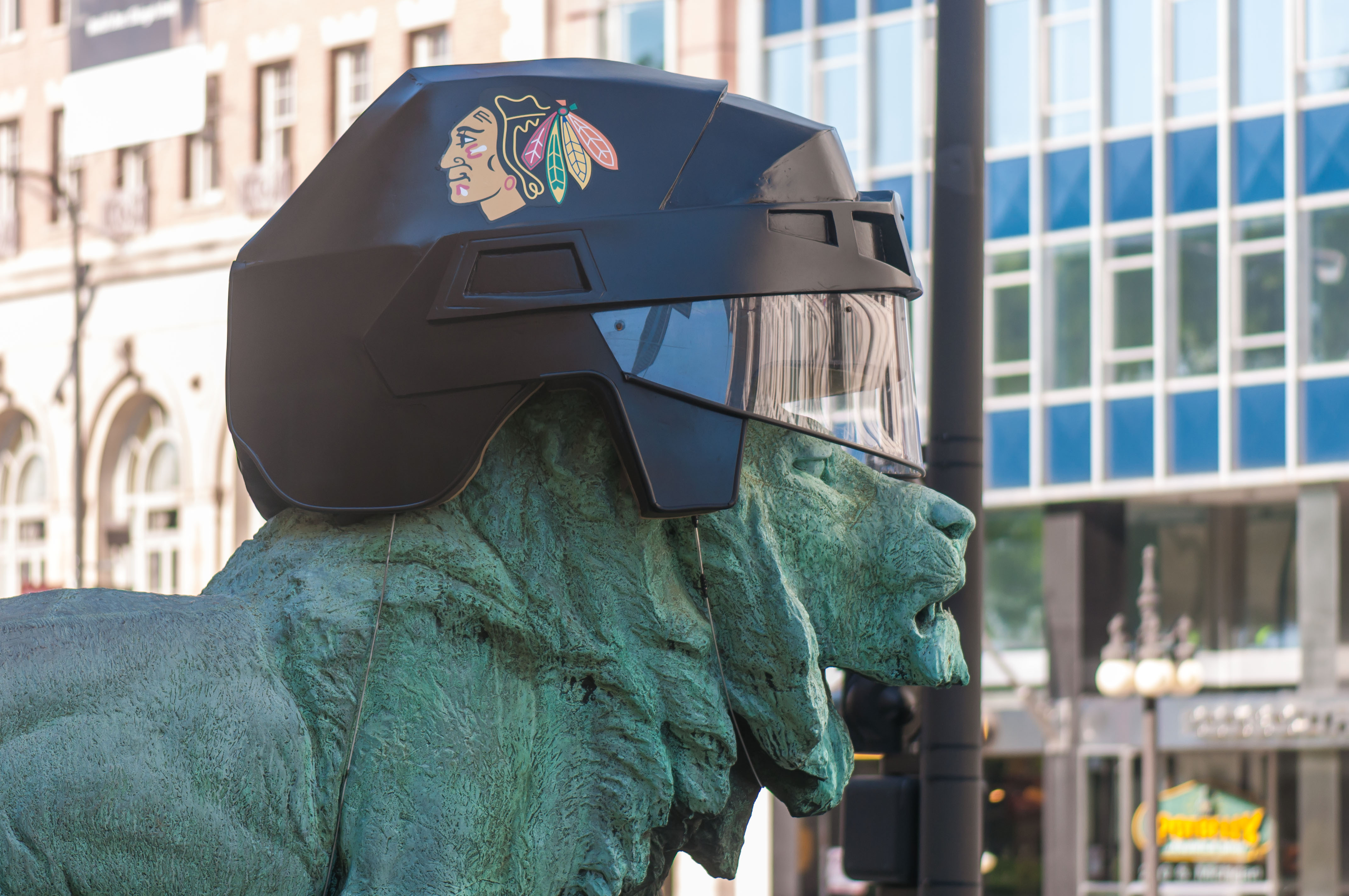
One of the two lion sculptures outside of the Art Institute of Chicago decorated for the team's Stanley Cup run

The Blackhawks qualified for the playoff for the fifth consecutive season. As the Presidents' Trophy winner, the Blackhawks had home-ice advantage. They faced the eighth-seeded Minnesota Wild in the Western Conference Quarterfinals, beating the Wild 4–1 in the best-of-seven series matchup.

The Blackhawks advanced to the Western Conference Semifinals to meet the seventh-seeded Detroit Red Wings. This was the last time these two Original Six would face each other as Western Conference and Central Division opponents as the Red Wings would move to the Atlantic Division and the Eastern Conference starting in the 2013–14 season. The Blackhawks won the series opener, but dropped three straight games. In Game 6, Blackhawks forward Michael Frolik was awarded a penalty shot by the officials. Frolik successfully converted against Red Wings goaltender Jimmy Howard, becoming the first player in NHL playoff history to score twice on a penalty shot. Frolik's last successful attempt on penalty shot was against the Vancouver Canucks during the first round of the 2010–11 playoffs.

The Blackhawks won Game 7 in overtime.

The Blackhawks advanced to the Western Conference Finals, making their third appearance in five seasons, where they faced the fifth seed and defending Stanley Cup champion, the Los Angeles Kings. The Blackhawks won the first two games of the series on home ice at the United Center. The Kings won Game 3, however, improving their playoff home win streak to 15–0 at the Staples Center. The Blackhawks rebounded in Game 4, snapping the Kings' playoff home win streak before returning to the United Center for Game 5.

The Blackhawks eliminated the reigning Stanley Cup Champions in Game 5 in double-overtime. The game ended at 11:40 of the second overtime period with a goal by Blackhawks forward Patrick Kane. The game-winning goal was Kane's third of the game, his second NHL career playoff hat-trick.

The Blackhawks clinched their second Stanley Cup Finals berth in four seasons and faced the 2011 Stanley Cup champions, the Boston Bruins. This marked the first faceoff of the season between the two teams due to the lockout-induced shortened season and the resulting intra-Conference-only match-ups. This also marked the first time since 1979 (Montreal Canadiens and New York Rangers) that two Original Six teams met in the Stanley Cup Finals.

The Blackhawks won Game 1 at 12:08 of the third overtime period, which nearly equated to two regulation NHL games. Game 1 went in the history books as the longest NHL game ever played at the United Center as well as the fifth-longest game in Stanley Cup Finals history.

The Blackhawks lost the next two games, Game 2 in overtime, giving the Bruins the lead in the series.

The Blackhawks rebounded in Game 4, winning 6–5 in overtime, equalizing the series. Blackhawks defensemen Brent Seabrook scored the game-winning overtime goal in Game 4, his second in the playoff since Game 7 of the Western Conference Quarterfinals against the Red Wings.

The Blackhawks returned to the United Center for Game 5, winning 3–1 in regulation providing the Blackhawks a 3–2 lead in the series.

The Blackhawks returned to TD Garden for Game 6. Down 0–1 after 7:19 of play, Blackhawks captain Jonathan Toews equalized the game at 4:24 of the second period. Both teams were tied going into the third period, but a goal by Bruins forward Milan Lucic at 12:11 gave the Bruins the lead again. Desperate for the equalizing goal, the Blackhawks pulled goaltender Corey Crawford to add an extra attacker. Forward Bryan Bickell equalized the game with 1:16 remaining. Overtime seemed inevitable, again, but Blackhawks forward Dave Bolland scored the game-winning goal 17 seconds later to help the Blackhawks earn a 3–2 win in regulation, eliminate the Bruins and capture the Stanley Cup.

The win gave the Blackhawks their second Stanley Cup in four years, a first for any team since the salary cap era, and made them the first team since the 2008 Red Wings to clinch both the Presidents' Trophy and the Stanley Cup in the same year.

Patrick Kane was awarded the Conn Smythe Trophy as the playoff Most Valuable Player, becoming the first American-born forward and fourth American-born player to receive this award. Kane also became the third consecutive American-born player to receive the Conn Smythe after Tim Thomas and Jonathan Quick, both goaltenders, from the previous two years. The win also made Blackhawks' Head Coach Joel Quenneville the only active NHL coach with two Stanley Cups, while also adding a second consecutive Stanley Cup to Assistant Coach Jamie Kompon's resume after he clinched it the previous season with the Kings. This was also Blackhawks forward Marian Hossa's second Cup in four Stanley Cup Finals appearances, as well as Blackhawks' Senior Advisor of Hockey Operations Scotty Bowman's 13th appearance on the Stanley Cup.

2013 Stanley Cup playoffs

Western Conference Quarterfinals vs. (8) Minnesota Wild – Chicago won series 4–1
Game	Date	Opponent	Score	OT	Decision	Arena	Attendance	Series	Recap
1	April 30	Minnesota Wild	2–1	16:35 OT	Crawford	United Center	21,428	1–0	W1
2	May 3	Minnesota Wild	5–2		Crawford	United Center	22,012	2–0	W2
3	May 5	@ Minnesota Wild	2–3	2:15 OT	Crawford	Xcel Energy Center	19,238	2–1	L1
4	May 7	@ Minnesota Wild	3–0		Crawford	Xcel Energy Center	19,378	3–1	W1
5	May 9	Minnesota Wild	5–1		Crawford	United Center	21,597	4–1	W2

Western Conference Semifinals vs. (7) Detroit Red Wings – Chicago won series 4–3
Game	Date	Opponent	Score	OT	Decision	Arena	Attendance	Series	Recap
1	May 15	Detroit Red Wings	4–1		Crawford	United Center	21,494	1–0	W3
2	May 18	Detroit Red Wings	1–4		Crawford	United Center	21,822	1–1	L1
3	May 20	@ Detroit Red Wings	1–3		Crawford	Joe Louis Arena	20,066	1–2	L2
4	May 23	@ Detroit Red Wings	0–2		Crawford	Joe Louis Arena	20,066	1–3	L3
5	May 25	Detroit Red Wings	4–1		Crawford	United Center	22,014	2–3	W1
6	May 27	@ Detroit Red Wings	4–3		Crawford	Joe Louis Arena	20,066	3–3	W2
7	May 29	Detroit Red Wings	2–1	3:35 OT	Crawford	United Center	22,103	4–3	W3

Western Conference Finals vs. (5) Los Angeles Kings – Chicago won series 4–1
Game	Date	Opponent	Score	OT	Decision	Arena	Attendance	Series	Recap
1	June 1	Los Angeles Kings	2–1		Crawford	United Center	21,535	1–0	W4
2	June 2	Los Angeles Kings	4–2		Crawford	United Center	21,824	2–0	W5
3	June 4	@ Los Angeles Kings	1–3		Crawford	Staples Center	18,477	2–1	L1
4	June 6	@ Los Angeles Kings	3–2		Crawford	Staples Center	18,621	3–1	W1
5	June 8	Los Angeles Kings	4–3	11:40 2OT	Crawford	United Center	22,237	4–1	W2

Stanley Cup Finals vs. (E4) Boston Bruins – Chicago won series 4–2
Game	Date	Opponent	Score	OT	Decision	Arena	Attendance	Series	Recap
1	June 12	Boston Bruins	4–3	12:08 3OT	Crawford	United Center	22,110	1–0	W3
2	June 15	Boston Bruins	1–2	13:48 OT	Crawford	United Center	22,154	1–1	L1
3	June 17	@ Boston Bruins	0–2		Crawford	TD Garden	17,565	1–2	L2
4	June 19	@ Boston Bruins	6–5	9:51 OT	Crawford	TD Garden	17,565	2–2	W1
5	June 22	Boston Bruins	3–1		Crawford	United Center	22,274	3–2	W2
6	June 24	@ Boston Bruins	3–2		Crawford	TD Garden	17,565	4–2	W3

Legend: Win Loss

== Player statistics ==
Updated as of June 25, 2013

=== Skaters ===
Note: Pos = Position; GP = Games played; G = Goals; A = Assists; Pts = Points; PIM = Penalty minutes; +/- = Plus/minus; PPG = Power-play goals; SHG = Short-handed goals; GWG = Game-winning goals

Regular season
Player	GP	G	A	Pts	+/-	PIM
Patrick Kane	47	23	32	55	11	8
Jonathan Toews	47	23	25	48	28	27
Marian Hossa	40	17	14	31	20	16
Brandon Saad	46	10	17	27	17	12
Duncan Keith	47	3	24	27	16	31
Viktor Stalberg	47	9	14	23	16	25
Bryan Bickell	48	9	14	23	12	25
Brent Seabrook	47	8	12	20	12	23
Patrick Sharp	28	6	14	20	8	14
Nick Leddy	48	6	12	18	15	10
Andrew Shaw	48	9	6	15	6	38
Dave Bolland	35	7	7	14	−7	22
Marcus Kruger	47	4	9	13	3	24
Johnny Oduya	48	3	9	12	12	10
Michal Rozsival	27	0	12	12	18	14
Michael Frolik	45	3	7	10	5	8
Niklas Hjalmarsson	46	2	8	10	15	22
Michal Handzus	11	1	5	6	7	4
Jimmy Hayes	10	1	3	4	0	0
Daniel Carcillo	23	2	1	3	1	11
Jeremy Morin	3	1	1	2	1	0
Jamal Mayers	19	0	2	2	2	16
Ben Smith	1	1	0	1	1	0
Sheldon Brookbank	26	1	0	1	−2	21
Brandon Bollig	25	0	0	0	−1	51
Drew LeBlanc	2	0	0	0	−3	0
Ryan Stanton	1	0	0	0	1	2
Brandon Pirri	1	0	0	0	0	0
Shawn Lalonde	1	0	0	0	1	0

Playoffs
Player	GP	G	A	Pts	+/-	PIM
Patrick Kane	23	9	10	19	7	8
Bryan Bickell	23	9	8	17	11	14
Patrick Sharp	23	10	6	16	1	8
Marian Hossa	22	7	9	16	8	2
Jonathan Toews	23	3	11	14	9	18
Duncan Keith	22	2	11	13	10	18
Michal Handzus	23	3	8	11	7	6
Michael Frolik	23	3	7	10	1	6
Andrew Shaw	23	5	4	9	2	35
Johnny Oduya	23	3	5	8	12	16
Dave Bolland	18	3	3	6	−2	24
Brandon Saad	23	1	5	6	−1	4
Marcus Kruger	23	3	2	5	−2	2
Niklas Hjalmarsson	23	0	5	5	10	4
Brent Seabrook	23	3	1	4	−1	4
Michal Rozsival	23	0	4	4	9	16
Viktor Stalberg	19	0	3	3	−1	6
Nick Leddy	23	0	2	2	−8	4
Daniel Carcillo	4	0	1	1	2	6
Brandon Bollig	5	0	0	0	−1	2
Ben Smith	1	0	0	0	−1	0
Sheldon Brookbank	1	0	0	0	−2	0

=== Goaltenders ===
Regular season
Player	GP	GS	TOI	W	L	OT	GA	GAA	SA	SV%	SO	G	A	PIM
Corey Crawford	30	28	1,760:31	19	5	5	57	1.94	769	.926	3	0	0	4
Ray Emery	21	19	1,116:00	17	1	0	36	1.94	460	.922	3	0	0	0
Carter Hutton	1	1	58:44	0	1	0	3	3.05	28	.893	0	0	0	0

Playoffs
Player	GP	GS	TOI	W	L	OT	GA	GAA	SA	SV%	SO	G	A	PIM
Corey Crawford	23	23	1,503:42	16	7	2	46	1.84	674	.932	1	0	0	0

^{†}Denotes player spent time with another team before joining the Blackhawks. Stats reflect time with the Blackhawks only.
^{‡}Traded mid-season
Bold/italics denotes franchise record

== Awards and milestones ==
=== Awards ===
Regular season
Player	Award	Reached
Corey Crawford	NHL 2nd Star of the Week	January 27, 2013
Patrick Kane	NHL 1st Star of the Week	February 11, 2013
Ray Emery	NHL 3rd Star of the Month	March 2, 2013
Corey Crawford & Ray Emery	William M. Jennings Trophy	April 27, 2013
Jonathan Toews	Frank J. Selke Trophy	June 14, 2013

Playoffs
Player	Award	Reached
Patrick Kane	Conn Smythe Trophy	June 24, 2013

=== Milestones ===
Regular season
Player	Milestone	Reached
Patrick Kane	400th Career NHL Game	January 19, 2013
Dave Bolland	300th Career NHL Game	January 22, 2013
Viktor Stalberg	200th Career NHL Game	January 24, 2013
Jamal Mayers	900th Career NHL Game	February 2, 2013
Brandon Saad	1st Career NHL Goal; 1st Career NHL Point	February 5, 2013
Jonathan Toews	150th Career NHL Goal	February 10, 2013
Nick Leddy	50th Career NHL Point	February 12, 2013
Niklas Hjalmarsson	50th Career NHL Point	February 15, 2013
Brent Seabrook	50th Career NHL Goal	February 17, 2013
Patrick Sharp	400th Career NHL Point	February 25, 2013
Marian Hossa	1,000th Career NHL Game	March 3, 2013
Marcus Kruger	100th Career NHL Game	March 3, 2013
Patrick Kane	400th Career NHL Point	March 14, 2013
Viktor Stalberg	100th Career NHL Point	April 7, 2013
Jonathan Toews	400th Career NHL Game	April 9, 2013
Viktor Stalberg	50th Career NHL Goal	April 12, 2013
Duncan Keith	600th Career NHL Game	April 12, 2013
Niklas Hjarlmarsson	300th Career NHL Game	April 12, 2013
Johnny Oduya	100th Career NHL Assist	April 12, 2013
Drew LeBlanc	1st Career NHL Game	April 24, 2013
Marian Hossa	500th Career NHL Assist	April 24, 2013
Carter Hutton	1st Career NHL Game	April 27, 2013
Shawn Lalonde	1st Career NHL Game	April 27, 2013
Ryan Stanton	1st Career NHL Game	April 27, 2013

Playoffs
Player	Milestone	Reached
Marcus Kruger	1st Career NHL Playoff Goal	May 9, 2013
Andrew Shaw	1st Career NHL Playoff Goal	May 9, 2013
Brandon Saad	1st Career NHL Playoff Goal	June 12, 2013

== Transactions ==
The Blackhawks have been involved in the following transactions during the 2012–13 season.

=== Trades ===
Date	Details
June 23, 2012	To San Jose Sharks 4th-round pick in 2012	To Chicago Blackhawks 7th-round pick in 2012; 4th-round pick in 2013
January 21, 2013	To Calgary Flames 7th-round pick in 2013	To Chicago Blackhawks Henrik Karlsson
January 31, 2013	To Washington Capitals Peter LeBlanc	To Chicago Blackhawks Mathieu Beaudoin
April 1, 2013	To San Jose Sharks 4th-round pick in 2013	To Chicago Blackhawks Michal Handzus
April 2, 2013	To Tampa Bay Lightning Philippe Paradis	To Chicago Blackhawks Kirill Gotovets
April 3, 2013	To Boston Bruins Rob Flick	To Chicago Blackhawks Maxime Sauve

=== Free agents acquired ===
Player	Former team	Contract terms
Sheldon Brookbank	Anaheim Ducks	2 years, $2.5 million
Michal Rozsival	Phoenix Coyotes	1 year, $2 million
Drew LeBlanc	St. Cloud State University	1 year, $925,000 entry-level contract
Antti Raanta	Ässät	1 year, $925,000 entry-level contract

=== Free agents lost ===
Player	New team	Contract terms
Sami Lepisto	Lokomotiv Yaroslavl	undisclosed

=== Claimed via waivers ===
Player	New team	Date claimed off waivers

=== Lost via waivers ===
Player	New team	Date claimed off waivers

=== Player signings ===
Player	Date	Contract terms
Brandon Bollig	June 18, 2012	2 years, $1.09 million
Carter Hutton	June 18, 2012	1 year, $525,000
Ben Smith	June 18, 2012	2 years, $1.185 million
Garret Ross	April 9, 2013	3 years, $1.91 million entry-level contract
Alex Broadhurst	May 31, 2013	3 years, $1.93 million entry-level contract

== Draft picks ==
Chicago's picks at the 2012 NHL entry draft in Pittsburgh, Pennsylvania.

Round	#	Player	Pos	Nationality	College/Junior/Club team (League)
1	18	Teuvo Teravainen	RW	Finland	Jokerit (SM-liiga)
2	48	Dillon Fournier	D	Canada	Rouyn-Noranda Huskies (QMJHL)
3	79	Chris Calnan	RW	United States	Noble and Greenough School (USHS-MA)
5	139	Garret Ross	LW	United States	Saginaw Spirit (OHL)
5	149^{[a]}	Travis Brown	D	Canada	Moose Jaw Warriors (WHL)
6	169	Vinnie Hinostroza	C	United States	Waterloo Black Hawks (USHL)
7	191	Brandon Whitney	G	Canada	Victoriaville Tigres (QMJHL)
7	199	Matt Tomkins	G	Canada	Sherwood Park (AJHL)

Draft notes

- ^{a} The New York Rangers' fifth-round pick went to the Chicago Blackhawks as a result of a February 27, 2012, trade that sent John Scott to the Rangers in exchange for this pick.

== See also ==
- 2012–13 NHL season
