= 2012–13 Los Angeles Kings season =

National Hockey League team season

2012–13 Los Angeles Kings
- Division: 2nd Pacific
- Conference: 5th Western
- 2012–13 record: 27–16–5
- Home record: 19–4–1
- Road record: 8–12–4
- Goals for: 131
- Goals against: 114

Team information
- General manager: Dean Lombardi
- Coach: Darryl Sutter
- Captain: Dustin Brown
- Alternate captains: Matt Greene; Anze Kopitar; Mike Richards (Jan.–Jun.)
- Arena: Staples Center
- Average attendance: 18,183 (100.4%) (13 games)

Team leaders
- Goals: Jeff Carter (26)
- Assists: Anze Kopitar (32)
- Points: Anze Kopitar (42)
- Penalty minutes: Kyle Clifford (51)
- Plus/minus: Jake Muzzin (+16)
- Wins: Jonathan Quick (18)
- Goals against average: Jonathan Bernier (1.87)

The 2012–13 Los Angeles Kings season was the 46th season (45th season of play) for the National Hockey League (NHL) franchise. The regular season was reduced from its usual 82 games to 48 due to the 2012–13 NHL lockout.

The team's attempt to defend their first Stanley Cup championship in franchise history was ended by the Chicago Blackhawks in the Western Conference finals.

== Regular season ==
=== January ===
The King started their season with three losses, their worst season opener since losing five of their first six games in 2007–08. They lost 5–2 in their season opener against the Chicago Blackhawks on January 19, surrendering more goals than in any of the 20 games during their 2012 playoff run. Chicago scored three goals in the first 15 minutes, and the Kings did not score their first until they were trailing 4–0. Matt Greene was placed on the injured reserve list after suffering a back injury in the game that was expected to take him out the rest of the season, a major blow to a Kings' defense already suffering from the loss of Willie Mitchell due to knee surgery. The Kings then began a challenging schedule with 11 of their next 15 games away, starting with a 1–3 loss against the Colorado Avalanche on January 22. Despite a poor start for Colorado, they defeated Los Angeles after a three-goal rally in the third period. Kopitar, who missed the first game due to a knee injury, failed to make a shot in 24 shifts against Colorado, and the Kings failed to score on any of their six power plays. After the loss, Dustin Penner was a healthy scratch for the next four games.

The Kings lost 1–3 to the Edmonton Oilers on January 24, making them one of only three teams in the league without a victory at that point. Los Angeles led 1–0 until the third period, when the Oilers appeared to tie it with 1:05 left after Ryan Nugent-Hopkins scored, but it was overturned after Jonathan Quick successfully argued Edmonton forward Sam Gagner interfered with him in the crease. But Oilers rookie Nail Yakupov forced overtime after scoring with 4.6 seconds left, which led to an Edmonton overtime victory. The Kings won their first game of the season on January 26, beating the Phoenix Coyotes 4–2. Kopitar scored two goals, his first regular season multi-goal game since October 8, 2011 against the Buffalo Sabres. Los Angeles continued to struggle with the power play, failing to capitalize on a 5-on-3 with their first unit on the ice the first 81 seconds.

The Kings won a second victory on January 28, beating the Vancouver Canucks 2–3. Los Angeles had a 2–0 deficit in the second period until Jeff Carter scored seven seconds into a power play advantage. The goal ended a 0-for-25 power play slump for the Kings, but they continued to hold the worst power play record in the league. Slava Voynov scored the game-tying goal with 44 seconds left in the third period to force overtime, where Carter made a third-round shootout goal to win the game. Los Angeles lost their next game on January 31, falling 2–1 in overtime to the Nashville Predators. Dustin Brown scored his first goal of the season, and although the Kings' offense struggled, their defense allowed only 11 shots in regulation and three more in overtime. Nashville goaltender Pekka Rinne stopped five of the Kings' eight shootout attempts before Nashville left wing Sergei Kostitsyn scored in the eighth round for the win.

=== February ===
Los Angeles opened the month with a 4–7 loss to the Anaheim Ducks on February 2, marking the second time in the season they allowed five goals in regulation. Quick was pulled from the goal after allowing Anaheim's Nick Bonino to score two goals in six minutes. Brown scored two power play goals for the Kings, who tied the game three times but never led. The Kings followed that loss with a 4–2 victory against the Columbus Blue Jackets, against whom they held without a shot on goal for more than 18 minutes and 28 seconds between the second and third periods. But Los Angeles suffered their first shutout of the season with a 0–3 loss to the Nashville Predators on February 7. The Kings made 32 shots on goal, but managed only four during the third period. Penner was again a healthy scratch. The Kings lost again on February 10 to the Detroit Red Wings despite a season-high 47 shots. Alec Martinez tied the game 2–2 for the Kings with 53 seconds left in the game, but Detroit's Jonathan Ericsson scored the game-winning goal with five seconds left.

Despite the loss, Red Wings coach Mike Babcock felt Los Angeles was the superior team in the third quarter, and Kopitar and Brown both believed it was the team's best game of the season so far. The Detroit game was later described as a turning point for the Kings, who went on to win five of their next six games. (Note: Los Angeles Times writer Lisa Dillman described the game as a "turning point", writing "Such a distinctive moment doesn't surface often, but that's what transpired when the Kings lost a game in the final five seconds two weeks ago at Detroit." Elliott Teaford of the Los Angeles Daily News wrote, "The Kings' hot streak actually began with a 3–2 loss in the closing seconds to the Detroit Red Wings on Feb. 10." In describing a Kings winning streak on February 25, Dustin Penner said, "We're on a steady climb to where we want to be. It started in Detroit and that steady climb continues.") They beat the St. Louis Blues 4–1 on February 11, with backup goaltender Jonathan Bernier making 21 saves in his first start with the Kings. Los Angeles matched their season best for goals, and Carter scored twice for the first time since game six of the 2012 Stanley Cup Final. Martinez, however, suffered an upper body injury in the first period and was placed on injured reserve, joining fellow defencemen Greene and Mitchell. Bernier started again the next game on February 15, when the Kings beat Columbus 2–1 in their first home game after five away. Kyle Clifford scored late in the second period, marking the first Kings lead in four home games, and Richards scored a goal with a two-man advantage in the third to capture his 400th NHL point.

The Kings lost 3–2 to the first-place Blackhawks on February 17. Trailing 3–0 in the third period, Richards scored two power play goals, but Los Angeles failed to tie the game on a six-on-four after pulling Quick from the ice. More than a quarter into the shortened season, the Kings were ranked 29th in the league for goals scored, and several players had no goals including Penner, Doughty, Simon Gagné, Trevor Lewis and Dwight King. The Kings won their next two away games, besting the Oilers 3–1 on February 19 and the Calgary Flames 3–1 on February 20. Colin Fraser, returning to the line-up after being scratched for four games, opened the scoring against Edmonton with his first goal of the season, and Carter broke a 1–1 tie with 49.4 seconds left in the game. Bernier had his third start and win of the season against Calgary, during which Los Angeles took six shots in the first five minutes before Brown scored on the seventh. Calgary scored their sole goal later in the first period, but Lewis regained the lead with a goal 29 seconds later, marking his first point in 13 games.

Finished their schedule of 11 of 15 away games finished, the Kings next began a more favorable schedule with 13 of their next 16 games at home, and 20 of the season's final 33 at home. The Kings beat Colorado 4–1 during their first home game on February 23, with Brown scoring the first goal 58 seconds into the game. Shortly after Colorado scored their only goal, Lewis regained the lead by making the Kings' first short-handed goal of the season. Los Angeles also defeated Anaheim 5–2 on February 26, where Penner tied the game 2–2 in the second period with first goal of the season, which the team followed with three unanswered goals in the third to win. Kopitar had a season-high three assists, and Carter scored an empty netter for his team-leading 10th goal of the season.

== Standings ==
=== Divisional standings ===
Pacific Division
Pos	Team	GP	W	L	OTL	ROW	GF	GA	GD	Pts
1	y – Anaheim Ducks	48	30	12	6	24	140	118	+22	66
2	x – Los Angeles Kings	48	27	16	5	25	133	118	+15	59
3	x – San Jose Sharks	48	25	16	7	17	124	116	+8	57
4	Phoenix Coyotes	48	21	18	9	17	125	131	−6	51
5	Dallas Stars	48	22	22	4	20	130	142	−12	48

Source: National Hockey League
x – Clinched playoff spot; y – Clinched division

=== Conference standings ===
Western Conference
Pos	Div	Team	GP	W	L	OTL	ROW	GF	GA	GD	Pts
1	CE	p – Chicago Blackhawks	48	36	7	5	30	155	102	+53	77
2	PA	y – Anaheim Ducks	48	30	12	6	24	140	118	+22	66
3	NW	y – Vancouver Canucks	48	26	15	7	21	127	121	+6	59
4	CE	x – St. Louis Blues	48	29	17	2	24	129	115	+14	60
5	PA	x – Los Angeles Kings	48	27	16	5	25	133	118	+15	59
6	PA	x – San Jose Sharks	48	25	16	7	17	124	116	+8	57
7	CE	x – Detroit Red Wings	48	24	16	8	22	124	115	+9	56
8	NW	x – Minnesota Wild	48	26	19	3	22	122	127	−5	55
9	CE	Columbus Blue Jackets	48	24	17	7	19	120	119	+1	55
10	PA	Phoenix Coyotes	48	21	18	9	17	125	131	−6	51
11	PA	Dallas Stars	48	22	22	4	20	130	142	−12	48
12	NW	Edmonton Oilers	48	19	22	7	17	125	134	−9	45
13	NW	Calgary Flames	48	19	25	4	19	128	160	−32	42
14	CE	Nashville Predators	48	16	23	9	14	111	139	−28	41
15	NW	Colorado Avalanche	48	16	25	7	14	116	152	−36	39

Source: National Hockey League
p – Clinched Presidents' Trophy; x – Clinched playoff spot; y – Clinched division

== Schedule and results ==
2012–13 Game Log

January: 2–2–2 (Home: 1–1–1; Road: 1–1–1)
#	Date	Visitor	Score	Home	OT	Decision	Attendance	Record	Pts	Recap
1	January 19	Chicago	5–2	Los Angeles		Quick	18,545	0–1–0	0	Recap
2	January 22	Los Angeles	1–3	Colorado		Quick	18,007	0–2–0	0	Recap
3	January 24	Los Angeles	1–2	Edmonton	OT	Quick	16.839	0–2–1	1	Recap
4	January 26	Los Angeles	4–2	Phoenix		Quick	14,780	1–2–1	3	Recap
5	January 28	Vancouver	2–3	Los Angeles	SO	Quick	18,344	2–2–1	5	Recap
6	January 31	Nashville	2–1	Los Angeles	SO	Quick	18,118	2–2–2	6	Recap

February: 8–4–0 (Home: 4–0–0; Road: 4–4–0)
#	Date	Visitor	Score	Home	OT	Decision	Attendance	Record	Pts	Recap
7	February 2	Los Angeles	4–7	Anaheim		Bernier	17,436	2–3–2	6	Recap
8	February 5	Los Angeles	4–2	Columbus		Quick	11,019	3–3–2	8	Recap
9	February 7	Los Angeles	0–3	Nashville		Quick	17,113	3–4–2	8	Recap
10	February 10	Los Angeles	2–3	Detroit		Quick	20,066	3–5–2	8	Recap
11	February 11	Los Angeles	4–1	St. Louis		Bernier	14,498	4–5–2	10	Recap
12	February 15	Columbus	1–2	Los Angeles		Bernier	18,118	5–5–2	12	Recap
13	February 17	Los Angeles	2–3	Chicago		Quick	21,843	5–6–2	12	Recap
14	February 19	Los Angeles	3–1	Edmonton		Quick	16,839	6–6–2	14	Recap
15	February 20	Los Angeles	3–1	Calgary		Bernier	19,289	7–6–2	16	Recap
16	February 23	Colorado	1–4	Los Angeles		Quick	18,118	8–6–2	18	Recap
17	February 25	Anaheim	2–5	Los Angeles		Quick	18,118	9–6–2	20	Recap
18	February 27	Detroit	1–2	Los Angeles		Bernier	18,118	10–6–2	22	Recap

March: 9–7–1 (Home: 7–3–0; Road: 2–4–1)
#	Date	Visitor	Score	Home	OT	Decision	Attendance	Record	Pts	Recap
19	March 2	Los Angeles	2–5	Vancouver		Quick	18,910	10–7–2	22	Recap
20	March 4	Nashville	1–5	Los Angeles		Bernier	18,118	11–7–2	24	Recap
21	March 5	St. Louis	4–6	Los Angeles		Quick	18,118	12–7–2	26	Recap
22	March 7	Dallas	5–2	Los Angeles		Quick	18,118	12–8–2	26
23	March 9	Calgary	2–6	Los Angeles		Quick	18,248	13–8–2	28
24	March 11	Calgary	1–3	Los Angeles		Quick	18,118	14–8–2	30
25	March 12	Los Angeles	2–5	Phoenix		Quick	15,075	14–9–2	30
26	March 14	Los Angeles	3–4	San Jose		Bernier	17,562	14–10–2	30
27	March 16	San Jose	5–2	Los Angeles		Bernier	18,118	15–10–2	32
28	March 18	Phoenix	0–4	Los Angeles		Quick	18,118	16–10–2	34
29	March 19	Phoenix	2–3	Los Angeles		Bernier	18,118	17–10–2	36
30	March 21	Dallas	2–0	Los Angeles		Quick	18,118	17–11–2	36
31	March 23	Vancouver	1–0	Los Angeles		Quick	18,118	17–12–2	36
32	March 25	Los Angeles	5–4	Chicago		Quick	21,850	18–12–2	38
33	March 28	Los Angeles	4–2	St. Louis		Quick	19,770	19–12–2	40
34	March 30	Los Angeles	3–4	Minnesota	SO	Quick	19,223	19–12–3	41
35	March 31	Los Angeles	3–2	Dallas		Bernier	15,719	20–12–3	43

April: 7–4–2 (Home: 7–0–0; Road: 0–4–2)
#	Date	Visitor	Score	Home	OT	Decision	Attendance	Record	Pts	Recap
36	April 2	Los Angeles	1–3	Phoenix		Quick	12,934	20–13–3	43
37	April 4	Minnesota	0–3	Los Angeles		Bernier	18,118	21–13–3	45
38	April 6	Edmonton	1–4	Los Angeles		Quick	18,118	22–13–3	47
39	April 7	Los Angeles	3–4	Anaheim	SO	Bernier	17,494	22–13–4	48
40	April 9	Los Angeles	1–5	Dallas		Quick	16,367	22–14–4	48
41	April 11	Colorado	2–3	Los Angeles	SO	Quick	18,118	23–14–4	50
42	April 13	Anaheim	1–2	Los Angeles		Quick	18,473	24–14–4	52
43	April 16	Los Angeles	2–3	San Jose	SO	Quick	17,562	24–14–5	53
44	April 18	Columbus	1–2	Los Angeles		Quick	18,118	25–14–5	55
45	April 21	Dallas	3–4	Los Angeles	OT	Quick	18,118	26–14–5	57
46	April 23	Los Angeles	1–2	Minnesota		Bernier	18,825	26–15–5	57
47	April 24	Los Angeles	1–3	Detroit		Quick	20,066	26–16–5	57
48	April 27	San Jose	2–3	Los Angeles		Quick	18,443	27–16–5	59

Legend: Win (2 points) Loss (0 points) Overtime/shootout loss (1 point)

== Playoffs ==
The Kings entered the playoffs as the Western Conference's fifth seed. Their quest for back to back Cups was ended by the Chicago Blackhawks in the Western Conference finals.

2013 Stanley Cup playoffs

Western Conference quarterfinals vs. (4) St. Louis Blues: Los Angeles won series 4–2
#	Date	Visitor	Score	Home	OT	Decision	Attendance	Series	Recap
1	April 30	Los Angeles	1–2	St. Louis	OT	Quick	17,612	0–1	Recap
2	May 2	Los Angeles	1–2	St. Louis		Quick	18,681	0–2	Recap
3	May 4	St. Louis	0–1	Los Angeles		Quick	18,118	1–2	Recap
4	May 6	St. Louis	3–4	Los Angeles		Quick	18,334	2–2	Recap
5	May 8	Los Angeles	3–2	St. Louis	OT	Quick	18,269	3–2	Recap
6	May 10	St. Louis	1–2	Los Angeles		Quick	18,346	4–2	Recap

Western Conference semifinals vs. (6) San Jose Sharks: Los Angeles won series 4–3
#	Date	Visitor	Score	Home	OT	Decision	Attendance	Series	Recap
1	May 14	San Jose	0–2	Los Angeles		Quick	18,118	1–0	Recap
2	May 16	San Jose	3–4	Los Angeles		Quick	18,527	2–0	Recap
3	May 18	Los Angeles	1–2	San Jose	OT	Quick	17,562	2–1	Recap
4	May 21	Los Angeles	1–2	San Jose		Quick	17,562	2–2	Recap
5	May 23	San Jose	0–3	Los Angeles		Quick	18,584	3–2	Recap
6	May 26	Los Angeles	1–2	San Jose		Quick	17,562	3–3	Recap
7	May 28	San Jose	1–2	Los Angeles		Quick	18,593	4–3	Recap

Western Conference finals vs. (1) Chicago Blackhawks: Chicago won series 4–1
#	Date	Visitor	Score	Home	OT	Decision	Attendance	Series	Recap
1	June 1	Los Angeles	1–2	Chicago		Quick	21,535	0–1	Recap
2	June 2	Los Angeles	2–4	Chicago		Quick	21,824	0–2	Recap
3	June 4	Chicago	1–3	Los Angeles		Quick	18,477	1–2	Recap
4	June 6	Chicago	3–2	Los Angeles		Quick	18,621	1–3	Recap
5	June 8	Los Angeles	3–4	Chicago	OT	Quick	22,237	1–4	Recap

Legend: = Win = Loss

== Player statistics ==
=== Skaters ===
Note: GP = Games played; G = Goals; A = Assists; Pts = Points; +/− = Plus/minus; PIM = Penalty minutes
Final stats

Regular season
Player	GP	G	A	Pts	+/-	PIM
Anze Kopitar	47	10	32	42	14	16
Justin Williams	48	11	22	33	15	22
Jeff Carter	48	26	7	33	0	16
Mike Richards	48	12	20	32	−8	42
Dustin Brown	46	18	11	29	6	22
Slava Voynov	48	6	19	25	5	14
Drew Doughty	48	6	16	22	4	36
Jarret Stoll	48	7	11	18	1	28
Jake Muzzin	45	7	9	16	16	35
Dustin Penner	33	2	12	14	−2	18
Trevor Lewis	48	5	9	14	5	19
Kyle Clifford	48	7	7	14	1	51
Rob Scuderi	48	1	11	12	−6	4
Dwight King	47	4	6	10	−3	11
Colin Fraser	34	2	5	7	−4	25
Brad Richardson	16	1	5	6	2	10
Jordan Nolan	44	2	4	6	−5	46
Alec Martinez	27	1	4	5	−2	10
Tyler Toffoli	10	2	3	5	3	2
Simon Gagne^{‡}	11	0	5	5	2	2
Davis Drewiske^{‡}	20	1	3	4	3	14
Keaton Ellerby^{†}	35	0	3	3	5	16
Robyn Regehr^{†}	12	0	2	2	0	2
Matt Greene	5	0	1	1	−1	8

Playoffs
Player	GP	G	A	Pts	+/-	PIM
Jeff Carter	18	6	7	13	6	14
Slava Voynov	18	6	7	13	9	0
Mike Richards	15	3	9	12	5	8
Justin Williams	18	6	3	9	0	8
Anze Kopitar	18	3	6	9	−2	12
Tyler Toffoli	12	2	4	6	5	0
Dustin Penner	18	3	2	5	4	8
Dwight King	18	2	3	5	−4	2
Drew Doughty	18	2	3	5	−7	8
Dustin Brown	18	3	1	4	2	8
Rob Scuderi	18	0	3	3	9	0
Trevor Lewis	18	1	2	3	−3	2
Jake Muzzin	17	0	3	3	−2	6
Matt Greene	9	0	2	2	3	6
Colin Fraser	16	0	2	2	−2	10
Alec Martinez	7	0	2	2	−4	8
Kyle Clifford	14	0	2	2	−1	8
Robyn Regehr	18	0	1	1	−8	6
Jarret Stoll	12	0	1	1	−2	4
Brad Richardson	11	0	1	1	−3	0
Keaton Ellerby	5	0	0	0	0	0
Jordan Nolan	7	0	0	0	0	4
Tanner Pearson	1	0	0	0	0	0

^{†}Denotes player spent time with another team before joining the Kings. Stats reflect time with the Kings only.
^{‡}Traded mid-season
Bold/italics denotes franchise record

=== Goaltenders ===
Note: GP = Games played; GS = Games started; TOI = Time on ice; W = Wins; L = Losses; OT = Overtime losses; GA = Goals against; GAA = Goals against average; SV = Saves; SA = Shots against; SV% = Save percentage; SO = Shutouts; G = Goals; A = Assists; PIM = Penalty minutes
Final stats

Regular season
Player	GP	GS	TOI	W	L	OT	GA	GAA	SA	SV%	SO	G	A	PIM
Jonathan Quick	37	36	2133:42	18	13	4	87	2.45	889	.902	1	0	0	2
Jonathan Bernier	14	12	768:21	9	3	1	24	1.88	306	.922	1	0	1	0
Totals		48	2,902:03	27	16	5	111	2.29	1195	.907	2	0	1	2

Playoffs
Player	GP	GS	TOI	W	L	GA	GAA	SA	SV%	SO	G	A	PIM
Jonathan Quick	18	18	1099:00	9	9	34	1.86	518	.934	3	0	1	14
Jonathan Bernier	1	0	29:55	0	0	0	0.00	9	1.000	0	0	0	0

== Milestones ==
Player	Milestone	Reached
Jake Muzzin	1st Career NHL Goal	January 26, 2013
Dustin Brown	600th Career NHL Game	January 28, 2013
Colin Fraser	300th Career NHL Game	February 7, 2013
Mike Richards	400th Career NHL Point	February 15, 2013
Jarret Stoll	200th Career NHL Assist	February 25, 2013
Dustin Brown	200th Career NHL Assist	February 25, 2013
Dustin Penner	500th Career NHL Game	February 27, 2013

== Transactions ==
The Kings have been involved in the following transactions during the 2012–13 season:

=== Trades ===
Date	Details
June 23, 2012	To Dallas Stars 7th-round pick in 2012	To Los Angeles Kings 7th-round pick in 2013
January 13, 2013	To Carolina Hurricanes Kevin Westgarth	To Los Angeles Kings Anthony Stewart; 4th-round pick in 2013; 6th-round pick in 2014
February 6, 2013	To New Jersey Devils Andrei Loktionov	To Los Angeles Kings 5th-round pick in 2013
February 8, 2013	To Florida Panthers 5th-round pick in 2013	To Los Angeles Kings Keaton Ellerby
February 26, 2013	To Philadelphia Flyers Simon Gagne	To Los Angeles Kings Conditional 3rd- or 4th-round pick in 2013 (Note: Pick became 4th-round pick after condition satisfied.)
April 1, 2013	To Buffalo Sabres 2nd-round pick in 2014; 2nd-round pick in 2015	To Los Angeles Kings Robyn Regehr
April 2, 2013	To Montreal Canadiens Davis Drewiske	To Los Angeles Kings 5th-round pick in 2013
June 23, 2013	To Toronto Maple Leafs Jonathan Bernier	To Los Angeles Kings Matt Frattin; Ben Scrivens; 2nd-round pick in 2014 or 2015 (Note: Toronto elected to trade its 2nd-round pick in 2015)

=== Free agents signed ===
Player	Former team	Contract terms
Andrew Bodnarchuk	Boston Bruins	1 year, $600,000
Kurtis MacDermid	Owen Sound Attack	3 years, $1.67 million entry-level

=== Free agents lost ===
Player	New team	Contract terms
Justin Azevedo	Lukko (Finland)	
Jeff Zatkoff	Pittsburgh Penguins	2 years, $525,000
Patrick Mullen	Vancouver Canucks	1 year, $600,000

=== Claimed via waivers ===
Player	Former team	Date claimed off waivers

=== Lost via waivers ===
Player	New team	Date claimed off waivers
Thomas Hickey	New York Islanders	January 15, 2013
Richard Clune	Nashville Predators	January 15, 2013

=== Lost via retirement ===
Player
Ethan Moreau

=== Player signings ===
Player	Date	Contract terms
Marc-Andre Cliche	June 15, 2012	2 years, $1.855 million
Richard Clune	June 15, 2012	2 years, $1.6375 million
Colin Fraser	June 23, 2012	2 years, $1.65 million
Jarret Stoll	June 23, 2012	3 years, $9.75 million
Jonathan Quick	July 1, 2012	10 years, $58 million contract extension
Dustin Penner	July 1, 2012	1 year, $3.25 million
Andrew Campbell	July 3, 2012	2 years, $1.075 million
Dwight King	July 16, 2012	2 years, $1.5 million
Thomas Hickey	July 17, 2012	1 year, $700,000
Stefan Legein	July 17, 2012	1 year, $715,000
David Meckler	July 17, 2012	1 year, $635,250
Jake Muzzin	July 17, 2012	1 year, $577,500
Tanner Pearson	August 3, 2012	3 years, $2.2075 million entry-level contract
Derek Forbort	April 5, 2013	3 years, $2.59 million entry-level contract
Nick Shore	April 13, 2013	3 years, $2.775 million entry-level contract
Robyn Regehr	May 30, 2013	2 years, $6 million contract extension
Slava Voynov	June 18, 2013	6 years, $25 million
Brandon Kozun	June 19, 2013	1 year, $550,000

== Draft picks ==
Los Angeles' selections at the 2012 NHL entry draft in Pittsburgh, Pennsylvania.

Round	#	Player	Pos	Nationality	College/Junior/Club team (League)
1	30	Tanner Pearson	LW	Canada	Barrie Colts (OHL)
4	121	Nikolai Prokhorkin		Russia	CSKA Moscow Jr. (MHL)
5	151	Colin Miller	D	Canada	Sault Ste. Marie Greyhounds (OHL)
6	171^{[a]}	Tomas Hyka	RW	Czech	Gatineau Olympiques (QMJHL)
6	181	Paul LaDue	D	US	Lincoln Stars (USHL)
7	211	Nick Ebert	D	US	Windsor Spitfires (OHL)

Draft notes

- The Kings' second-round pick went to the Philadelphia Flyers as the result of a June 23, 2011, trade that sent Mike Richards and Rob Bordson to the Kings in exchange for Wayne Simmonds, Brayden Schenn this pick.
- The Kings' third-round pick went to the Edmonton Oilers as the result of a February 28, 2011, trade that sent Dustin Penner to the Kings in exchange for Colten Teubert, 2011 first-round pick and this conditional pick (second round if Kings win 2011 Stanley Cup, else third round).
- ^{a} The Philadelphia Flyers' sixth-round pick went to the Los Angeles Kings as a result of an October 12, 2011, trade that sent future considerations to the Flyers in exchange for Stefan Legein and this pick.
- The Edmonton Oilers' seventh-round pick went to the Dallas Stars (via Los Angeles) as the result of a trade on June 23, 2012, that sent a seventh-round pick in 2013 to Los Angeles in exchange for this pick. Los Angeles had previously acquired this pick as a result of a June 26, 2011 trade that sent Ryan Smyth to the Oilers in exchange for Colin Fraser and this pick.

== See also ==
- 2012–13 NHL season
