= Mark Cundari =

Canadian ice hockey player

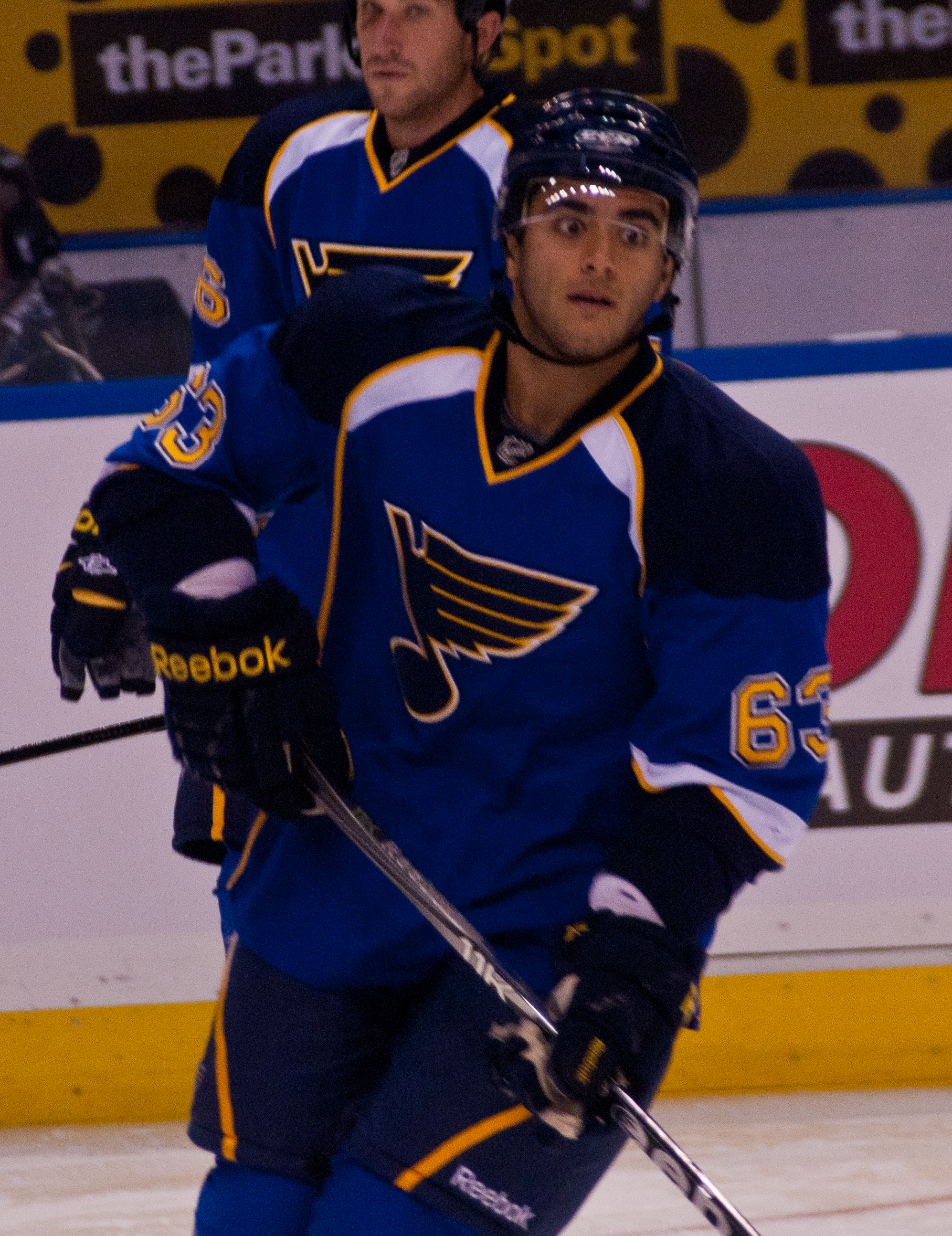
- Cundari with the St. Louis Blues in 2011
- Born: April 23, 1990 (age 36) Woodbridge, Ontario, Canada
- Height: 5 ft 9 in (175 cm)
- Weight: 203 lb (92 kg; 14 st 7 lb)
- Position: Defence
- Shot: Left
- Played for: Calgary Flames; Augsburger Panther; Eisbären Berlin; Krefeld Pinguine; EC VSV
- NHL draft: Undrafted
- Playing career: 2010–2020

Mark Anthony Cundari (born April 23, 1990) is a Canadian former professional ice hockey defenceman. As a junior, Cundari was a member of two Memorial Cup championship teams with the Windsor Spitfires before turning professional in 2010. An undrafted player, he spent the majority of three seasons in the St. Louis Blues organization before being traded to the Calgary Flames in 2013.

== Playing career ==
Cundari played four seasons of major junior hockey with the Windsor Spitfires of the Ontario Hockey League (OHL) between 2006 and 2010. He appeared in 248 games in that time and scored 30 goals, 133 points, and had 553 penalty minutes. A defenceman, Cundari was eligible for the 2008 NHL entry draft but went unselected due to his small stature. The St. Louis Blues invited him to their development camp over the summer and after he participated in their training camp prior to the 2008–09 season, signed Cundari to a contract before returning him to the Spitfires. Cundari and the Spitfires won consecutive OHL championships in 2008–09 and 2009–10 and in both years won the Memorial Cup as Canadian Hockey League champions.

Following his graduation from junior hockey, Cundari turned professional within the Blues organization as he joined the team's American Hockey League (AHL) affiliate, the Peoria Rivermen. He scored 30 points in 69 games in the 2010–11 AHL season, then 15 in 49 games in 2011–12. In his third season with Peoria, Cundari was named to play in the AHL All-Star game, where he recorded an assist and, with a tripping call, became the first player in eight years to be penalized during the contest. Cundari was traded to the Calgary Flames in an April 1, 2013, deal by the Blues, along with goaltender Reto Berra and a first round draft pick (which the Flames later used to draft Emile Poirier of the Gatineau Olympiques) in exchange for defenceman Jay Bouwmeester. Cundari, who was recovering from a wrist injury at the time, was assigned to the Abbotsford Heat, Calgary's AHL affiliate.

The Flames recalled Cundari late in the 2012–13 season. He made his NHL debut on April 21, 2013, and scored his first goal against Minnesota Wild goaltender Niklas Bäckström. He appeared in four games with Calgary and added two assists to go along with 28 points in the AHL combined between Peoria and Abbotsford. Cundari failed to impress the Flames coaching staff during training camp before the 2013–14 season and was demoted to Abbotsford to begin the season. He fell further out of favour by midseason and was subsequently loaned to the Chicago Wolves, AHL affiliate of the Blues. However, after recording 13 points in his first 22 games with the Wolves while playing in all defensive situations, Cundari was recalled by Calgary for the final games of the NHL season.

On July 2, 2015, Cundari left the Flames organization as a free agent to sign a one-year, two-way contract with the San Jose Sharks. In the 2015–16 season, Cundari was unable to build upon his previous season in his first season within the Sharks organization. He contributed with 8 points in 34 games with the San Jose Barracuda before he was loaned by the Sharks to the Lake Erie Monsters, an affiliate to the Columbus Blue Jackets, for the remainder of the year on March 7, 2016. Cundari appeared in 7 regular season games with the Monsters, before suffering an injury that ruled him out for the remainder of the season.

As an impending free agent, Cundari left the NHL to sign his first contract abroad in agreeing to a one-year deal with the German DEL club, Augsburger Panther on June 9, 2016. After two seasons with the Panthers, Cundari left after his contract opting to continue with the DEL on a one-year pact with Eisbären Berlin on June 13, 2018.

Cundari's single season in Berlin during the 2018–19 campaign was cut short through injury, limited to just 14 games for 7 points. As a free agent in the off-season, Cundari continued his tenure in the DEL, securing a one-year contract with Krefeld Pinguine on May 21, 2019.

Medal record

Ice hockey

Representing Canada

Spengler Cup
Gold medal – first place	2015 Davos	

== Career statistics ==
			Regular season					Playoffs
Season	Team	League	GP	G	A	Pts	PIM	GP	G	A	Pts	PIM
2005–06	Vaughan Vipers	OPJHL	2	0	0	0	0	—	—	—	—	—
2006–07	Windsor Spitfires	OHL	62	6	16	22	130	—	—	—	—	—
2007–08	Windsor Spitfires	OHL	63	6	17	23	141	3	0	0	0	10
2008–09	Windsor Spitfires	OHL	60	10	22	32	143	20	1	8	9	38
2009–10	Windsor Spitfires	OHL	63	8	46	54	139	19	3	15	18	42
2010–11	Peoria Rivermen	AHL	69	10	20	30	106	3	0	1	1	4
2011–12	Peoria Rivermen	AHL	48	3	12	15	62	—	—	—	—	—
2012–13	Peoria Rivermen	AHL	56	7	18	25	80	—	—	—	—	—
2012–13	Abbotsford Heat	AHL	2	0	3	3	13	—	—	—	—	—
2012–13	Calgary Flames	NHL	4	1	2	3	2	—	—	—	—	—
2013–14	Abbotsford Heat	AHL	32	4	6	10	45	—	—	—	—	—
2013–14	Chicago Wolves	AHL	24	5	8	13	28	9	1	2	3	10
2013–14	Calgary Flames	NHL	4	0	0	0	0	—	—	—	—	—
2014–15	Adirondack Flames	AHL	50	7	22	29	64	—	—	—	—	—
2015–16	San Jose Barracuda	AHL	34	3	5	8	29	—	—	—	—	—
2015–16	Lake Erie Monsters	AHL	7	3	3	6	8	—	—	—	—	—
2016–17	Augsburger Panther	DEL	48	10	21	31	60	5	0	2	2	4
2017–18	Augsburger Panther	DEL	50	10	22	32	58	—	—	—	—	—
2018–19	Eisbären Berlin	DEL	14	3	4	7	10	—	—	—	—	—
2019–20	Krefeld Pinguine	DEL	23	1	7	8	45	—	—	—	—	—
2019–20	EC VSV	EBEL	15	3	3	6	11	3	0	0	0	31
NHL totals			8	1	2	3	2	—	—	—	—	—

== Awards and honours ==
Awards	Year
CHL
Memorial Cup Champion	2009, 2010
