= 2011–12 Colorado Avalanche season =

National Hockey League team season

2011–12 Colorado Avalanche
- Division: 3rd Northwest
- Conference: 11th Western
- 2011–12 record: 41–35–6
- Home record: 22–17–2
- Road record: 19–18–4
- Goals for: 208
- Goals against: 220

Team information
- General manager: Greg Sherman
- Coach: Joe Sacco
- Captain: Vacant (Oct.–Nov.); Milan Hejduk (Nov.–Apr.)
- Alternate captains: Milan Hejduk (Oct.–Nov.); Paul Stastny; Rotating
- Arena: Pepsi Center
- Average attendance: 15,431 (85.7%)

Team leaders
- Goals: Gabriel Landeskog (22)
- Assists: Ryan O'Reilly (37)
- Points: Ryan O'Reilly (55)
- Penalty minutes: Cody McLeod (164)
- Plus/minus: Gabriel Landeskog (+20)
- Wins: Semyon Varlamov (26)
- Goals against average: Jean-Sebastien Gigure (2.27)

The 2011–12 Colorado Avalanche season was the 40th overall season for the franchise, the 33rd since joining the National Hockey League (NHL), and 17th since relocating to Colorado.

The Avalanche failed to qualify for the 2012 Stanley Cup playoffs, finishing seven points behind the eighth-placed Los Angeles Kings in the Western Conference.

== Off-Season ==
On June 16, 2011, the Avalanche promoted former player Adam Deadmarsh to assistant coach. Deadmarsh will take Steve Konowalchuk's place behind the bench, as Konowalchuk has accepted the head coaching position for the Western Hockey League's Seattle Thunderbirds.

Captain Adam Foote retired.

== Regular season ==
The Avalanche retired Peter Forsberg's number 21 jersey on opening night, October 8.

On November 14, the Avalanche named Milan Hejduk as the third captain in Avalanche history.

The Avalanche had the fewest power-play opportunities of all 30 teams, with just 223.

== Standings ==
Northwest Division
Pos	Team	GP	W	L	OTL	ROW	GF	GA	GD	Pts
1	p – Vancouver Canucks	82	51	22	9	43	249	198	+51	111
2	Calgary Flames	82	37	29	16	34	202	226	−24	90
3	Colorado Avalanche	82	41	35	6	32	208	220	−12	88
4	Minnesota Wild	82	35	36	11	24	177	226	−49	81
5	Edmonton Oilers	82	32	40	10	27	212	239	−27	74

Source: National Hockey League
p – Clinched Presidents' Trophy

Western Conference
Pos	Div	Team	GP	W	L	OTL	ROW	GF	GA	GD	Pts
1	NW	p – Vancouver Canucks	82	51	22	9	43	249	198	+51	111
2	CE	y – St. Louis Blues	82	49	22	11	45	210	165	+45	109
3	PA	y – Phoenix Coyotes	82	42	27	13	36	216	204	+12	97
4	CE	x – Nashville Predators	82	48	26	8	43	237	210	+27	104
5	CE	x – Detroit Red Wings	82	48	28	6	39	248	203	+45	102
6	CE	x – Chicago Blackhawks	82	45	26	11	38	248	238	+10	101
7	PA	x – San Jose Sharks	82	43	29	10	34	228	210	+18	96
8	PA	x – Los Angeles Kings	82	40	27	15	34	194	179	+15	95
9	NW	Calgary Flames	82	37	29	16	34	202	226	−24	90
10	PA	Dallas Stars	82	42	35	5	35	211	222	−11	89
11	NW	Colorado Avalanche	82	41	35	6	32	208	220	−12	88
12	NW	Minnesota Wild	82	35	36	11	24	177	226	−49	81
13	PA	Anaheim Ducks	82	34	36	12	31	204	231	−27	80
14	NW	Edmonton Oilers	82	32	40	10	27	212	239	−27	74
15	CE	Columbus Blue Jackets	82	29	46	7	25	202	262	−60	65

Source: National Hockey League
p – Clinched Presidents' Trophy; x – Clinched playoff spot; y – Clinched division

== Schedule and results ==
Win (2 points) Loss (0 points) Overtime/shootout loss (1 point)

=== Pre-season ===
2011 Pre-season Game log: 2–4–0 (Home: 1–2–0; Road: 1–2–0)

#	Date	Visitor	Score	Home	OT	Decision	Record	Recap
1	September 22	Colorado Avalanche	2–5	Dallas Stars		Cann	0–1–0	
2	September 23	St. Louis Blues	3–2	Colorado Avalanche		Varlamov	0–2–0	
3	September 25	Dallas Stars	0–3	Colorado Avalanche		Giguere	1–2–0	
4	September 28	Los Angeles Kings	6–0	Colorado Avalanche		Varlamov	1–3–0	
5	September 29	Colorado Avalanche	1–3	St. Louis Blues		Giguere	1–4–0	
6	October 1 (in Las Vegas, Nevada)	Colorado Avalanche	4–1	Los Angeles Kings		Varlamov	2–4–0	

=== Regular season ===
2011–12 Game log
October: 7–4–0 (Home: 1–3–0; Road: 6–1–0)

#	Date	Visitor	Score	Home	OT	Decision	Attendance	Record	Pts	Recap
1	October 8	Detroit Red Wings	3–0	Colorado Avalanche		Varlamov	18,007	0–1–0	0	
2	October 10	Colorado Avalanche	1–0	Boston Bruins		Varlamov	17,565	1–1–0	2	
3	October 12	Colorado Avalanche	3–2	Columbus Blue Jackets	SO	Varlamov	8,986	2–1–0	4	
4	October 13	Colorado Avalanche	7–1	Ottawa Senators		Giguere	19,239	3–1–0	6	
5	October 15	Colorado Avalanche	6–5	Montreal Canadiens	SO	Varlamov	21,273	4–1–0	8	
6	October 17	Colorado Avalanche	3–2	Toronto Maple Leafs	OT	Giguere	19,359	5–1–0	10	
7	October 20	Chicago Blackhawks	3–1	Colorado Avalanche		Varlamov	17,523	5–2–0	10	
8	October 22	Colorado Avalanche	5–4	Chicago Blackhawks	SO	Varlamov	21,328	6–2–0	12	
9	October 26	Colorado Avalanche	2–4	Calgary Flames		Giguere	19,289	6–3–0	12	
10	October 28	Edmonton Oilers	3–1	Colorado Avalanche		Varlamov	15,057	6–4–0	12	
11	October 30	Los Angeles Kings	2–3	Colorado Avalanche		Varlamov	12,355	7–4–0	14	

November: 4–9–1 (Home: 4–6–0; Road: 0–3–1)

#	Date	Visitor	Score	Home	OT	Decision	Attendance	Record	Pts	Recap
12	November 2	Phoenix Coyotes	4–1	Colorado Avalanche		Varlamov	12,141	7–5–0	14	
13	November 4	Colorado Avalanche	6–7	Dallas Stars	OT	Varlamov	11,981	7–5–1	15	
14	November 6	Calgary Flames	2–1	Colorado Avalanche		Varlamov	15,356	7–6–1	15	
15	November 8	Colorado Avalanche	2–5	Detroit Red Wings		Varlamov	20,066	7–7–1	15	
16	November 10	New York Islanders	3–4	Colorado Avalanche	OT	Giguere	13,221	8–7–1	17	
17	November 12	Calgary Flames	4–3	Colorado Avalanche		Varlamov	14,919	8–8–1	17	
18	November 15	Colorado Avalanche	3–6	Pittsburgh Penguins		Varlamov	18,483	8–9–1	17	
19	November 17	Colorado Avalanche	0–1	Minnesota Wild		Giguere	16,779	8–10–1	17	
20	November 18	Dallas Stars	0–3	Colorado Avalanche		Giguere	16,091	9–10–1	19	
21	November 20	San Jose Sharks	4–1	Colorado Avalanche		Giguere	15,013	9–11–1	19	
22	November 23	Vancouver Canucks	3–0	Colorado Avalanche		Varlamov	15,538	9–12–1	19	
23	November 26	Edmonton Oilers	2–5	Colorado Avalanche		Varlamov	17,684	10–12–1	21	
24	November 28	Dallas Stars	3–1	Colorado Avalanche		Varlamov	12,015	10–13–1	21	
25	November 30	New Jersey Devils	1–6	Colorado Avalanche		Varlamov	14,251	11–13–1	23	

December: 6–4–0 (Home: 6–0–0; Road: 0–4–0)

#	Date	Visitor	Score	Home	OT	Decision	Attendance	Record	Pts	Recap
26	December 2	St. Louis Blues	2–3	Colorado Avalanche	SO	Varlamov	15,966	12–13–1	25	
27	December 4	Detroit Red Wings	2–4	Colorado Avalanche		Varlamov	17,014	13–13–1	27	
28	December 6	Colorado Avalanche	0–6	Vancouver Canucks		Varlamov	18,890	13–14–1	27	
29	December 8	Colorado Avalanche	2–3	Calgary Flames		Giguere	19,289	13–15–1	27	
30	December 9	Colorado Avalanche	1–4	Edmonton Oilers		Varlamov	16,839	13–16–1	27	
31	December 13	San Jose Sharks	3–4	Colorado Avalanche	SO	Varlamov	14,374	14–16–1	29	
32	December 15	Colorado Avalanche	4–5	San Jose Sharks		Varlamov	17,562	14–17–1	29	
33	December 17	Washington Capitals	1–2	Colorado Avalanche		Giguere	16,011	15–17–1	31	
34	December 19	Philadelphia Flyers	2–3	Colorado Avalanche	SO	Giguere	14,889	16–17–1	33	
35	December 21	St. Louis Blues	2–3	Colorado Avalanche		Giguere	15,421	17–17–1	35	
36	December 23	Tampa Bay Lightning	1–2	Colorado Avalanche	OT	Giguere	16,165	18–17–1	37	
37	December 26	Colorado Avalanche	4–2	Minnesota Wild		Varlamov	19,290	19–17–1	39	
38	December 27	Winnipeg Jets	4–1	Colorado Avalanche		Giguere	18,007	19–18–1	39	
39	December 29	Phoenix Coyotes	2–3	Colorado Avalanche		Varlamov	17,839	20–18–1	41	
40	December 31	Colorado Avalanche	4–2	Anaheim Ducks		Giguere	15,119	21–18–1	43	

January: 5–6–1 (Home: 1–2–0; Road: 4–4–1)

#	Date	Visitor	Score	Home	OT	Decision	Attendance	Record	Pts	Recap
41	January 2	Colorado Avalanche	2–1	Los Angeles Kings	SO	Giguere	18,118	22–18–1	45	
42	January 6	Colorado Avalanche	4–0	Chicago Blackhawks		Varlamov	21,807	23–18–1	47	
43	January 7	Colorado Avalanche	0–4	St. Louis Blues		Giguere	19,150	23–19–1	47	
44	January 10	Nashville Predators	4–1	Colorado Avalanche		Varlamov	14,417	23–20–1	47	
45	January 12	Colorado Avalanche	2–3	Nashville Predators	OT	Giguere	16,905	23–20–2	48	
46	January 14	Colorado Avalanche	2–1	Dallas Stars		Giguere	15,838	24–20–2	50	
47	January 16	Colorado Avalanche	1–6	Phoenix Coyotes		Varlamov	12,757	24–21–2	50	
48	January 18	Florida Panthers	3–4	Colorado Avalanche	OT	Giguere	13,465	25–21–2	52	
49	January 21	Colorado Avalanche	3–1	Los Angeles Kings		Giguere	18,118	26–21–2	54	
50	January 22	Colorado Avalanche	2–3	Anaheim Ducks		Giguere	14,004	26–22–2	54	
51	January 24	Minnesota Wild	3–2	Colorado Avalanche		Giguere	16,291	26–23–2	54	
52	January 31	Colorado Avalanche	2–3	Edmonton Oilers		Varlamov	16,839	26–24–2	54	

February: 7–3–2 (Home: 4–1–1; Road: 3–2–1)

#	Date	Visitor	Score	Home	OT	Decision	Attendance	Record	Pts	Recap
53	February 2	Minnesota Wild	1–0	Colorado Avalanche		Giguere	14,186	26–25–2	54	
54	February 4	Vancouver Canucks	3–2	Colorado Avalanche	SO	Giguere	17,024	26–25–3	55	
55	February 7	Chicago Blackhawks	2–5	Colorado Avalanche		Giguere	16,553	27–25–3	57	
56	February 10	Carolina Hurricanes	3–4	Colorado Avalanche	OT	Giguere	16,854	28–25–3	59	
57	February 11	Colorado Avalanche	2–3	St. Louis Blues	OT	Varlamov	19,150	28–25–4	60	
58	February 15	Colorado Avalanche	1–3	Vancouver Canucks		Varlamov	18,890	28–26–4	60	
59	February 17	Colorado Avalanche	3–1	Edmonton Oilers		Varlamov	16,839	29–26–4	62	
60	February 19	Colorado Avalanche	1–5	Winnipeg Jets		Varlamov	15,004	29–27–4	62	
61	February 22	Los Angeles Kings	1–4	Colorado Avalanche		Varlamov	15,907	30–27–4	64	
62	February 24	Colorado Avalanche	5–0	Columbus Blue Jackets		Varlamov	16,925	31–27–4	66	
63	February 25	Colorado Avalanche	4–3	Detroit Red Wings		Giguere	20,066	32–27–4	68	
64	February 27	Anaheim Ducks	1–4	Colorado Avalanche		Varlamov	15,133	33–27–4	70	

March: 8–6–2 (Home: 4–2–1; Road: 4–4–1)

#	Date	Visitor	Score	Home	OT	Decision	Attendance	Record	Pts	Recap
65	March 1	Columbus Blue Jackets	2–0	Colorado Avalanche		Varlamov	13,236	33–28–4	70	
66	March 3	Pittsburgh Penguins	5–1	Colorado Avalanche		Giguere	18,007	33–29–4	70	
67	March 4	Colorado Avalanche	2–0	Minnesota Wild		Varlamov	17,354	34–29–4	72	
68	March 6	Minnesota Wild	1–7	Colorado Avalanche		Varlamov	13,385	35–29–4	74	
69	March 8	Colorado Avalanche	2–4	Nashville Predators		Varlamov	17,113	35–30–4	74	
70	March 10	Edmonton Oilers	2–3	Colorado Avalanche	SO	Varlamov	15,683	36–30–4	76	
71	March 12	Anaheim Ducks	2–3	Colorado Avalanche	OT	Varlamov	15,045	37–30–4	78	
72	March 14	Colorado Avalanche	5–4	Buffalo Sabres	SO	Varlamov	18,690	38–30–4	80	
73	March 15	Colorado Avalanche	0–1	New Jersey Devils	SO	Giguere	16,055	38–30–5	81	
74	March 17	Colorado Avalanche	3–1	New York Rangers		Varlamov	18,200	39–30–5	83	
75	March 20	Calgary Flames	1–2	Colorado Avalanche	OT	Varlmaov	14,223	40–30–5	85	
76	March 22	Colorado Avalanche	2–3	Phoenix Coyotes		Varlamov	14,938	40-31-5	85	
77	March 24	Vancouver Canucks	3–2	Colorado Avalanche	OT	Varlamov	18,007	40-31-6	86	
78	March 26	Colorado Avalanche	1–5	San Jose Sharks		Varlamov	17,562	40-32-6	86	
79	March 28	Colorado Avalanche	0–1	Vancouver Canucks		Varlamov	18,890	40-33-6	86	
80	March 30	Colorado Avalanche	4–1	Calgary Flames		Varlamov	19,289	41-33-6	88	

April: 0–2–0 (Home: 0–2–0; Road: 0–0–0)

#	Date	Visitor	Score	Home	OT	Decision	Attendance	Record	Pts	Recap
81	April 5	Columbus Blue Jackets	5–2	Colorado Avalanche		Varlamov	15,610	41-34-6	88	
82	April 7	Nashville Predators	6–1	Colorado Avalanche		Giguere	18,007	41-35-6	88	

== Playoffs ==
The Colorado Avalanche failed to qualify for the 2012 Stanley Cup playoffs.

== Player statistics ==
=== Skaters ===
Note: GP = Games played; G = Goals; A = Assists; Pts = Points; +/− = Plus/minus; PIM = Penalty minutes

Regular season

Player	GP	G	A	Pts	+/−	PIM
Ryan O'Reilly	81	18	37	55	-1	12
Paul Stastny	79	21	32	53	−8	34
Gabriel Landeskog	82	22	30	52	20	51
Milan Hejduk	81	14	23	37	−12	14
David Jones	72	20	17	37	−8	32
Matt Duchene	58	14	14	28	−11	8
Erik Johnson	73	4	22	26	−7	26
Kyle Quincey^{‡}	54	5	18	23	−1	60
Ryan Wilson	59	1	20	21	11	33
Shane O'Brien	76	3	17	20	2	105
Jan Hejda	81	5	14	19	−17	24
Daniel Winnik^{‡}	63	5	13	18	−11	42
Jay McClement	80	10	7	17	−8	31
Peter Mueller	32	7	9	16	-3	8
Chuck Kobasew	58	7	7	14	−10	51
TJ Galiardi^{‡}	55	8	6	14	−6	47
Stefan Elliott	39	4	9	13	2	8
Steve Downie^{†}	20	2	11	13	9	16
Jamie McGinn^{†}	17	8	5	13	-4	11
Cody McLeod	75	6	5	11	0	164
Ryan O'Byrne	74	1	6	7	-5	57
Kevin Porter	35	4	3	7	−2	17
Mark Olver	24	4	3	7	0	15
David Van der Gulik	25	1	5	6	3	2
Matt Hunwick	33	3	3	6	-3	8
Joakim Lindstrom	16	2	3	5	−9	0
Brad Malone	9	0	2	2	1	0
Evan Brophey	3	0	0	0	0	0
Tyson Barrie	10	0	0	0	−2	0
Mike Connolly	2	0	0	0	0	2
Brandon Yip^{‡}	10	0	0	0	1	8

=== Goaltenders ===
Note: GP = Games played; TOI = Time on ice (minutes); W = Wins; L = Losses; OT = Overtime losses; GA = Goals against; GAA= Goals against average; SA= Shots against; Sv% = Save percentage; SO= Shutouts; G= Goals; A= Assists; PIM= Penalties in minutes

Regular season

Player	GP	TOI	W	L	OT	GA	GAA	SA	Sv%	SO	G	A	PIM
Semyon Varlamov	53	3151	26	24	3	136	2.59	1564	.913	4	0	1	2
Jean-Sebastien Giguere	32	1820	15	11	3	69	2.27	850	.919	2	0	0	2

^{†}Denotes player spent time with another team before joining Avalanche. Stats reflect time with the Avalanche only.
^{‡}Traded mid-season

== Awards and records ==
=== Awards ===
Regular Season
Player	Award	Awarded
Ryan O'Reilly	NHL Second Star of the Week	December 5, 2011
Jean-Sebastien Giguere	NHL Third Star of the Week	December 26, 2011
Gabriel Landeskog	NHL Rookie of the Month	February 2012

=== Records ===
Regular Season
Player	Record

=== Milestones ===
Regular Season
Player	Milestone	Reached
Gabriel Landeskog	1st Career NHL Game	October 8, 2011
Gabriel Landeskog	1st Career NHL Goal; 1st Career NHL Point	October 12, 2011
Gabriel Landeskog	1st Career NHL Assist	October 13, 2011
Ryan O'Byrne	200th Career NHL Game	October 22, 2011
Kyle Quincey	200th Career NHL Game	November 8, 2011
Daniel Winnik	300th Career NHL Game	November 15, 2011
Shane O'Brien	400th Career NHL Game	November 20, 2011
Stefan Elliott	1st Career NHL Game; 1st Career NHL Goal; 1st Career NHL Point	November 26, 2011
Stefan Elliott	1st Career NHL Assist	November 28, 2011
Chuck Kobasew	500th Career NHL Game	December 8, 2011
Jay McClement	500th Career NHL Game	December 8, 2011
Brad Malone	1st Career NHL Game	December 8, 2011
Brad Malone	1st Career NHL Assist; 1st Career NHL Point	December 19, 2011
Cody McLeod	300th Career NHL Game	December 19, 2011
Matt Duchene	200th Career NHL Game	December 29, 2011
Chuck Kobasew	100th Career NHL Goal	December 31, 2011
David Jones	200th Career NHL Game	January 2, 2012
Ryan O'Reilly	200th Career NHL Game	January 12, 2012
Tyson Barrie	1st Career NHL Game	February 7, 2012
David Jones	100th Career NHL Point	February 7, 2012
Paul Stastny	400th Career NHL Game	February 7, 2012
Jan Hejda	400th Career NHL Game	February 19, 2012
Ryan O'Reilly	100th Career NHL Point	February 25, 2012
Mike Connolly	1st Career NHL Game	March 4, 2012
Semyon Varlamov	100th Career NHL Game	March 6, 2012
Erik Johnson	100th Career NHL Assist	March 30, 2012

== Transactions ==
The Avalanche have been involved in the following transactions during the 2011–12 season:

=== Trades ===
Date	Details
June 24, 2011	To Toronto Maple Leafs John-Michael Liles	To Colorado Avalanche 2nd-round pick in 2012
July 1, 2011	To Washington Capitals 1st-round pick in 2012; Conditional 2nd-round pick in 2012 (Note: Condition satisfied.)	To Colorado Avalanche Semyon Varlamov
October 8, 2011	To Anaheim Ducks Kyle Cumiskey	To Colorado Avalanche Jake Newton; Conditional 7th-round pick in 2013 (Note: Condition satisfied.)
February 2, 2012	To Washington Capitals Mike Carman	To Colorado Avalanche Danny Richmond
February 21, 2012	To Tampa Bay Lightning Kyle Quincey	To Colorado Avalanche Steve Downie
February 27, 2012	To San Jose Sharks TJ Galiardi; Daniel Winnik; 7th-round pick in 2013	To Colorado Avalanche Jamie McGinn; Mike Connolly; Michael Sgarbossa

=== Free agents acquired ===
Player	Former team	Contract terms
Joakim Lindstrom	Skelleftea AIK	1 year, $600,000
Patrick Bordeleau	Lake Erie Monsters	1 year, $525,000
Jan Hejda	Columbus Blue Jackets	4 years, $13 million
Jean-Sebastien Giguere	Toronto Maple Leafs	2 years, $2.5 million
Chuck Kobasew	Minnesota Wild	2 years, $2.5 million
Cedrick Desjardins	Tampa Bay Lightning	1 year, $650,000
Evan Brophey	Chicago Blackhawks	1 year, $525,000
Patrick Rissmiller	Florida Panthers	1 year, $525,000
Shane O'Brien	Nashville Predators	1 year, $1.1 million

=== Free agents lost ===
Player	New team	Contract terms
Peter Budaj	Montreal Canadiens	2 years, $2.3 million
Tomas Fleischmann	Florida Panthers	4 years, $18 million
Brian Elliott	St. Louis Blues	1 year, $600,000
Ben Walter	Calgary Flames	2 years, $1.07 million
Philippe Dupuis	Toronto Maple Leafs	1 year, $650,000
Jason Bacashihua	Philadelphia Flyers	1 year, $525,000

=== Claimed via waivers ===
Player	Former team	Date claimed off waivers

=== Lost via waivers ===
Player	New team	Date claimed off waivers
Brandon Yip	Nashville Predators	January 19, 2012

=== Lost via retirement ===
Player
Adam Foote

=== Player signings ===
Player	Date	Contract terms
Milan Hejduk	May 11, 2011	1 year, $2.6 million
David Jones	June 29, 2011	1 year, $2.5 million
Ryan O'Byrne	June 30, 2011	2 years, $3.6 million
Matt Hunwick	June 30, 2011	1 year, $1.55 million
Semyon Varlamov	July 2, 2011	3 years, $8.5 million
David Liffiton	July 8, 2011	1 year, $525,000
Greg Mauldin	July 8, 2011	1 year, $525,000
Justin Mercier	July 8, 2011	1 year, $525,000
Ryan Stoa	July 8, 2011	1 year, $803,250
David Van der Gulik	July 8, 2011	1 year, $525,000
Kevin Porter	July 9, 2011	1 year, $850,000
Ryan Wilson	July 9, 2011	1 year, $1.275 million
TJ Galiardi	July 12, 2011	1 year, $700,000
Semyon Varlamov	July 2, 2011	3 years, $8.5 million
Gabriel Landeskog	July 28, 2011	3 years, $2.775 million entry-level contract
Duncan Siemens	July 28, 2011	3 years, $2.775 million entry-level contract
Kyle Cumiskey	September 9, 2011	1 year, $708,750
Paul Carey	April 11, 2012	2 years, $1.35 million entry-level contract
Sami Aittokallio	May 11, 2012	3 years, $2.05 million entry-level contract
Kieran Millan	May 11, 2012	2 years, $1.255 million entry-level contract
Kent Patterson	May 11, 2012	2 years, $1.255 million entry-level contract
Milan Hejduk	May 18, 2012	1 year, $2 million contract extension
Cody McLeod	June 4, 2012	3 years, $3.5 million contract extension
David Jones	June 6, 2012	4 years, $16 million
Matt Hunwick	June 6, 2012	2 years, $3.2 million

== Draft picks ==
Colorado's picks at the 2011 NHL entry draft in St. Paul, Minnesota.

Round	#	Player	Position	Nationality	College/Junior/Club team (League)
1	2	Gabriel Landeskog	LW	Sweden	Kitchener Rangers (OHL)
1	11 (from St. Louis)	Duncan Siemens	D	Canada	Saskatoon Blades (WHL)
4	93	Joachim Nermark	C	Sweden	Linkopings HC (Elitserien)
5	123	Garrett Meurs	C	Canada	Plymouth Whalers (OHL)
6	153	Gabriel Beaupre	D	Canada	Val-d'Or Foreurs (QMJHL)
7	183	Dillon Donnelly	D	United States	Shawinigan Cataractes (QMJHL)

== See also ==
- 2011–12 NHL season
