= 2011–12 San Jose Sharks season =

National Hockey League team season

2011–12 San Jose Sharks
- Division: 2nd Pacific
- Conference: 7th Western
- 2011–12 record: 43–29–10
- Home record: 26–12–3
- Road record: 17–17–7
- Goals for: 228
- Goals against: 210

Team information
- General manager: Doug Wilson
- Coach: Todd McLellan
- Captain: Joe Thornton
- Alternate captains: Dan Boyle; Ryane Clowe; Patrick Marleau
- Arena: HP Pavilion at San Jose
- Average attendance: 17,562

Team leaders
- Goals: Logan Couture; Joe Pavelski (31)
- Assists: Joe Thornton (59)
- Points: Joe Thornton (77)
- Penalty minutes: Ryane Clowe (97)
- Plus/minus: Joe Pavelski (+18)
- Wins: Antti Niemi (34)
- Goals against average: Thomas Greiss (2.30)

The 2011–12 San Jose Sharks season was the team's 21st season in the National Hockey League (NHL).

== Offseason ==
The Sharks, disappointed in their playoff results, traded away two major players of their team to the Minnesota Wild. Devin Setoguchi was traded for Brent Burns, and Dany Heatley was traded for Martin Havlat. Burns was targeted to fill a hole on the Sharks as a shut-down defensive presence. Heatley was traded after posting disappointing playoff results.

== Season recap ==
=== Regular season ===
The preseason was successful, ending in a 5–1–0 record with the only loss came to Phoenix.

The Sharks started the season rather slowly; they gained a win at their opener at home against Phoenix but then lost three straight. Afterwards, the Sharks won the first five games on their six-game road trip. The win against the Devils came on a shootout, with Joe Thornton participating in his 1000th NHL career game, and the win against the Islanders by a sudden-death goal from Brent Burns, so the Sharks won both games that went into overtime. They ended this road trip with a loss against the Rangers before heading back home for a six-game stand. The first one was a win after shootout against the Penguins before losing the first game after overtime to the Predators before the next two games were won. The home stand ended with five wins and only one loss, coming against the Coyotes. The Sharks took over the first position in the Pacific Division in November and had 13 wins in the books after 20 games. After that, the Sharks lost four out of five with the only win vs. the Canadiens by a shootout. The Sharks just won one of the next five games, before they went on a four-game winning streak to take the top spot in the Pacific Division over Christmas. December was finished with two losses to the Ducks and Canucks.

The new year started with two wins on the road, another one at home and the number 1 spot in the division. After an away overtime loss vs. the Wild the Sharks captured their second shutout victory in a 2–0 win over the Jets. January was ended with two shutouts by Antti Niemi and at top of their division. February included an unsuccessful nine-game road trip.

The Sharks clinched a playoff spot on the fifth of April, their 81st game of the regular season.

The Sharks were the most disciplined team during the regular season, with only 225 power-play opportunities against.

=== Playoffs ===
In the playoffs, the Sharks faced the St. Louis Blues, a number 2 seed, in the first round, the conference quarterfinals in a best-of-seven series. The Sharks won Game 1 by a score of 3–2 after double overtime by a goal from Martin Havlat who scored twice, with Andrew Desjardins sent this game into overtime with his goal five minutes before the end of regulation. Game 2 was won by the Blues, who scored once every period, 3–0. The Blues continued their dominance by posting a 4–3 victory in Game 3, with two of the three goals by the Sharks coming in the waning minutes of the third period. The Blues then won a second straight game in San Jose, in Game 4, by a score of 2–1. The Blues led the series 3–1. With coming back over to St. Louis, the Sharks went into the third period with a lead, courtesy of a goal from Joe Thornton. The Blues, however, answered with two quick goals in the middle of the last period and scored another goal late in the game to capture the series in five games.

== Standings ==
Pacific Division
Pos	Team	GP	W	L	OTL	ROW	GF	GA	GD	Pts
1	y – Phoenix Coyotes	82	42	27	13	36	216	204	+12	97
2	x – San Jose Sharks	82	43	29	10	34	228	210	+18	96
3	x – Los Angeles Kings	82	40	27	15	34	194	179	+15	95
4	Dallas Stars	82	42	35	5	35	211	222	−11	89
5	Anaheim Ducks	82	34	36	12	31	204	231	−27	80

Source: National Hockey League
x – Clinched playoff spot; y – Clinched division

Western Conference
Pos	Div	Team	GP	W	L	OTL	ROW	GF	GA	GD	Pts
1	NW	p – Vancouver Canucks	82	51	22	9	43	249	198	+51	111
2	CE	y – St. Louis Blues	82	49	22	11	45	210	165	+45	109
3	PA	y – Phoenix Coyotes	82	42	27	13	36	216	204	+12	97
4	CE	x – Nashville Predators	82	48	26	8	43	237	210	+27	104
5	CE	x – Detroit Red Wings	82	48	28	6	39	248	203	+45	102
6	CE	x – Chicago Blackhawks	82	45	26	11	38	248	238	+10	101
7	PA	x – San Jose Sharks	82	43	29	10	34	228	210	+18	96
8	PA	x – Los Angeles Kings	82	40	27	15	34	194	179	+15	95
9	NW	Calgary Flames	82	37	29	16	34	202	226	−24	90
10	PA	Dallas Stars	82	42	35	5	35	211	222	−11	89
11	NW	Colorado Avalanche	82	41	35	6	32	208	220	−12	88
12	NW	Minnesota Wild	82	35	36	11	24	177	226	−49	81
13	PA	Anaheim Ducks	82	34	36	12	31	204	231	−27	80
14	NW	Edmonton Oilers	82	32	40	10	27	212	239	−27	74
15	CE	Columbus Blue Jackets	82	29	46	7	25	202	262	−60	65

Source: National Hockey League
p – Clinched Presidents' Trophy; x – Clinched playoff spot; y – Clinched division

== Schedule and results ==
=== Pre-season ===
2011 Pre-season Game Log
#	Date	Visitor	Score	Home	OT	Decision	Record	Recap
1	September 21	San Jose Sharks	6–1	Anaheim Ducks		Greiss	1–0–0	Recap
2	September 23	Anaheim Ducks	1–5	San Jose Sharks		Greiss	2–0–0	Recap
3	September 24	Phoenix Coyotes	0–1	San Jose Sharks		Sateri	3–0–0	Recap
4	September 25	San Jose Sharks	4–3	Vancouver Canucks		Greiss	4–0–0	Recap
5	September 29	Vancouver Canucks	0–3	San Jose Sharks		Greiss	5–0–0	Recap
6	October 1	San Jose Sharks	1–3	Phoenix Coyotes		Greiss	5–1–0	Recap

=== Regular season ===
- Green background indicates win (2 points).
- Red background indicates regulation loss (0 points).
- White background indicates overtime/shootout loss (1 point).

2011–12 Game Log: 43–29–10 (Home: 26–12–3; Road: 17–17–7)

October: 6–4–0 (Home: 1–2–0; Road: 5–2–0)
#	Date	Visitor	Score	Home	OT/SO	Decision	Attendance	Record	Pts	Recap
1	October 8	Phoenix Coyotes	3–6	San Jose Sharks		Greiss	17,562	1–0–0	2	Recap
2	October 14	San Jose Sharks	0–1	Anaheim Ducks		Greiss	17,243	1–1–0	2	Recap
3	October 15	St. Louis Blues	4–2	San Jose Sharks		Greiss	17,562	1–2–0	2	Recap
4	October 17	Anaheim Ducks	3–2	San Jose Sharks		Niemi	17,562	1–3–0	2	Recap
5	October 21	San Jose Sharks	4–3	New Jersey Devils	SO	Niemi	14,319	2–3–0	4	Recap
6	October 22	San Jose Sharks	4–2	Boston Bruins		Niemi	17,545	3–3–0	6	Recap
7	October 25	San Jose Sharks	3–1	Nashville Predators		Niemi	15,121	4–3–0	8	Recap
8	October 28	San Jose Sharks	4–2	Detroit Red Wings		Niemi	20,066	5–3–0	10	Recap
9	October 29	San Jose Sharks	3–2	New York Islanders	OT	Greiss	11,742	6–3–0	12	Recap
10	October 31	San Jose Sharks	2–5	New York Rangers		Niemi	17,852	6–4–0	12	Recap

November: 7–3–1 (Home: 5–2–1; Road: 2–1–0)
#	Date	Visitor	Score	Home	OT/SO	Decision	Attendance	Record	Pts	Recap
11	November 3	Pittsburgh Penguins	3–4	San Jose Sharks	SO	Greiss	17,562	7–4–0	14	Recap
12	November 5	Nashville Predators	4–3	San Jose Sharks	OT	Niemi	17,562	7–4–1	15	Recap
13	November 7	Los Angeles Kings	2–4	San Jose Sharks		Niemi	17,562	8–4–1	17	Recap
14	November 10	Minnesota Wild	1–3	San Jose Sharks		Niemi	17,562	9–4–1	19	Recap
15	November 12	Phoenix Coyotes	3–0	San Jose Sharks		Greiss	17,562	9–5–1	19	Recap
16	November 17	Detroit Red Wings	2–5	San Jose Sharks		Niemi	17,562	10–5–1	21	Recap
17	November 19	San Jose Sharks	4–1	Dallas Stars		Niemi	13,711	11–5–1	23	Recap
18	November 20	San Jose Sharks	4–1	Colorado Avalanche		Greiss	15,013	12–5–1	25	Recap
19	November 23	Chicago Blackhawks	0–1	San Jose Sharks		Niemi	17,562	13–5–1	27	Recap
20	November 26	Vancouver Canucks	3–2	San Jose Sharks		Niemi	17,562	13–6–1	27	Recap
21	November 28	San Jose Sharks	0–2	Los Angeles Kings		Niemi	18,118	13–7–1	27	Recap

December: 6–4–3 (Home: 6–3–1; Road: 0–1–2)
#	Date	Visitor	Score	Home	OT/SO	Decision	Attendance	Record	Pts	Recap
22	December 1	Montreal Canadiens	3–4	San Jose Sharks	SO	Niemi	17,562	14–7–1	29	Recap
23	December 3	Florida Panthers	5–3	San Jose Sharks		Greiss	17,562	14–8–1	29	Recap
24	December 6	Minnesota Wild	2–1	San Jose Sharks		Niemi	17,562	14–9–1	29	Recap
25	December 8	Dallas Stars	2–5	San Jose Sharks		Niemi	17,562	15–9–1	31	Recap
26	December 10	San Jose Sharks	0–1	St. Louis Blues		Niemi	19,150	15–10–1	31	Recap
27	December 11	San Jose Sharks	2–3	Chicago Blackhawks	OT	Niemi	21,456	15–10–2	32	Recap
28	December 13	San Jose Sharks	3–4	Colorado Avalanche	SO	Niemi	14,374	15–10–3	33	Recap
29	December 15	Colorado Avalanche	4–5	San Jose Sharks		Niemi	17,562	16–10–3	35	Recap
30	December 17	Edmonton Oilers	2–3	San Jose Sharks		Niemi	17,562	17–10–3	37	Recap
31	December 21	Tampa Bay Lightning	2–7	San Jose Sharks		Niemi	17,562	18–10–3	39	Recap
32	December 23	Los Angeles Kings	1–2	San Jose Sharks	OT	Niemi	17,562	19–10–3	41	Recap
33	December 26	Anaheim Ducks	3–2	San Jose Sharks		Niemi	17,562	19–11–3	41	Recap
34	December 28	Vancouver Canucks	3–2	San Jose Sharks	OT	Niemi	17,562	19–11–4	42	Recap

January: 9–3–2 (Home: 4–1–0; Road: 5–2–2)
#	Date	Visitor	Score	Home	OT/SO	Decision	Attendance	Record	Pts	Recap
35	January 2	San Jose Sharks	3–2	Vancouver Canucks	OT	Niemi	18,890	20–11–4	44	Recap
36	January 4	San Jose Sharks	3–1	Anaheim Ducks		Niemi	14,596	21–11–4	46	Recap
37	January 5	Columbus Blue Jackets	1–2	San Jose Sharks		Greiss	17,562	22–11–4	48	Recap
38	January 7	Washington Capitals	2–5	San Jose Sharks		Niemi	17,562	23–11–4	50	Recap
39	January 10	San Jose Sharks	4–5	Minnesota Wild	OT	Niemi	18,986	23–11–5	51	Recap
40	January 12	San Jose Sharks	2–0	Winnipeg Jets		Niemi	15,004	24–11–5	53	Recap
41	January 14	San Jose Sharks	2–1	Columbus Blue Jackets		Greiss	16,582	25–11–5	55	Recap
42	January 15	San Jose Sharks	3–4	Chicago Blackhawks		Niemi	21,645	25–12–5	55	Recap
43	January 17	Calgary Flames	1–2	San Jose Sharks	OT	Niemi	17,562	26–12–5	57	Recap
44	January 19	Ottawa Senators	4–1	San Jose Sharks		Niemi	17,562	26–13–5	57	Recap
45	January 21	San Jose Sharks	3–4	Vancouver Canucks		Niemi	18,890	26–14–5	57	Recap
46	January 23	San Jose Sharks	1–2	Edmonton Oilers	SO	Greiss	16,839	26–14–6	58	Recap
47	January 24	San Jose Sharks	1–0	Calgary Flames		Niemi	19,289	27–14–6	60	Recap
48	January 31	Columbus Blue Jackets	0–6	San Jose Sharks		Niemi	17,562	28–14–6	62	Recap

February: 5–8–1 (Home: 3–1–0; Road: 2–7–1)
#	Date	Visitor	Score	Home	OT/SO	Decision	Attendance	Record	Pts	Recap
49	February 2	Dallas Stars	2–5	San Jose Sharks		Greiss	12,979	29–14–6	64	Recap
50	February 4	San Jose Sharks	3–5	Phoenix Coyotes		Niemi	17,562	29–15–6	64	Recap
51	February 8	Calgary Flames	4–3	San Jose Sharks		Niemi	17,562	29–16–6	64	Recap
52	February 10	Chicago Blackhawks	3–5	San Jose Sharks		Niemi	17,562	30–16–6	66	Recap
53	February 12	San Jose Sharks	0–3	St. Louis Blues		Niemi	18,447	30–17–6	66	Recap
54	February 13	San Jose Sharks	5–3	Washington Capitals		Greiss	18,506	31–17–6	68	Recap
55	February 16	San Jose Sharks	5–6	Tampa Bay Lightning	OT	Niemi	16,819	31–17–7	69	Recap
56	February 17	San Jose Sharks	2–3	Carolina Hurricanes		Greiss	18,680	31–18–7	69	Recap
57	February 19	San Jose Sharks	2–3	Detroit Red Wings		Niemi	20,066	31–19–7	69	Recap
58	February 21	San Jose Sharks	3–6	Columbus Blue Jackets		Greiss	14,625	31–20–7	69	Recap
59	February 23	San Jose Sharks	2–1	Toronto Maple Leafs		Niemi	19,493	32–20–7	71	Recap
60	February 25	San Jose Sharks	2–6	Nashville Predators		Niemi	17,113	32–21–7	71	Recap
61	February 26	San Jose Sharks	3–4	Minnesota Wild		Greiss	17,401	32–22–7	71	Recap
62	February 28	Philadelphia Flyers	0–1	San Jose Sharks		Niemi	17,562	33–22–7	73	Recap

March: 7–7–3 (Home: 6–3–1; Road: 1–4–2)
#	Date	Visitor	Score	Home	OT/SO	Decision	Attendance	Record	Pts	Recap
63	March 1	Buffalo Sabres	1–0	San Jose Sharks		Niemi	17,562	33–23–7	73	Recap
64	March 3	St. Louis Blues	3–1	San Jose Sharks		Niemi	17,562	33–24–7	73	Recap
65	March 6	Edmonton Oilers	3–2	San Jose Sharks	SO	Niemi	17,562	33–24–8	74	Recap
66	March 8	San Jose Sharks	3–4	Dallas Stars	SO	Niemi	16,812	33–24–9	75	Recap
67	March 10	San Jose Sharks	0–3	Phoenix Coyotes		Niemi	14,994	33–25–9	75	Recap
68	March 12	San Jose Sharks	3–2	Edmonton Oilers		Niemi	16,839	34–25–9	77	Recap
69	March 13	San Jose Sharks	2–3	Calgary Flames	OT	Niemi	19,289	34–25–10	78	Recap
70	March 15	Nashville Predators	1–2	San Jose Sharks	SO	Niemi	17,562	35–25–10	80	Recap
71	March 17	Detroit Red Wings	2–3	San Jose Sharks	OT	Niemi	17,562	36–25–10	82	Recap
72	March 19	Anaheim Ducks	5–3	San Jose Sharks		Niemi	17,562	36–26–10	82	Recap
73	March 20	San Jose Sharks	2–5	Los Angeles Kings		Niemi	18,118	36–27–10	82	Recap
74	March 22	Boston Bruins	1–2	San Jose Sharks		Niemi	17,562	37–27–10	84	Recap
75	March 24	Phoenix Coyotes	3–4	San Jose Sharks	SO	Niemi	17,562	38–27–10	86	Recap
76	March 26	Colorado Avalanche	1–5	San Jose Sharks		Niemi	17,562	39–27–10	88	Recap
77	March 28	San Jose Sharks	1–3	Anaheim Ducks		Niemi	14,780	39–28–10	88	Recap
78	March 29	San Jose Sharks	0–2	Phoenix Coyotes		Niemi	14,446	39–29–10	88	Recap
79	March 31	Dallas Stars	0–3	San Jose Sharks		Niemi	17,562	40–29–10	90	Recap

April: 3–0–0 (Home: 1–0–0; Road: 2–0–0)
#	Date	Visitor	Score	Home	OT/SO	Decision	Attendance	Record	Pts	Recap
80	April 3	San Jose Sharks	5–2	Dallas Stars		Niemi	18,584	41–29–10	92	Recap
81	April 5	San Jose Sharks	6–5	Los Angeles Kings	SO	Niemi	18,330	42–29–10	94	Recap
82	April 7	Los Angeles Kings	2–3	San Jose Sharks	OT	Greiss	17,562	43–29–10	96	Recap

=== Playoffs ===
The Sharks clinched a playoff spot and made their eighth consecutive appearance in the playoffs.

2012 Stanley Cup Playoffs

Western Conference Quarterfinals: vs. (2) St. Louis Blues - St. Louis wins series 4–1
#	Date	Visitor	Score	Home	OT	Decision	Attendance	Series	Recap
1	April 12	San Jose	3–2	St. Louis	OT	Niemi	19,333	0–1	Recap
2	April 14	San Jose	0–3	St. Louis		Niemi	19,500	1–1	Recap
3	April 16	St. Louis	4–3	San Jose		Niemi	17,562	2–1	Recap
4	April 19	St. Louis	2–1	San Jose		Niemi	17,562	3–1	Recap
5	April 21	San Jose	1–3	St. Louis		Niemi	19,490	4–1	Recap

== Player statistics ==
=== Skaters ===
Note: GP = Games played; G = Goals; A = Assists; Pts = Points; +/− = Plus/minus; PIM = Penalty minutes

Updated April 21, 2012.

Regular season

Player	GP	G	A	Pts	+/−	PIM
Joe Thornton	82	18	59	77	+17	31
Logan Couture	80	31	34	65	+2	16
Patrick Marleau	82	30	34	64	+10	26
Joe Pavelski	82	31	30	61	+18	31
Dan Boyle	81	9	39	48	+10	57
Ryane Clowe	76	17	28	45	−5	97
Brent Burns	81	11	26	37	+8	34
Martin Havlat	39	7	20	27	+10	22
Jamie McGinn^{‡}	61	12	12	24	+1	26
Michal Handzus	67	7	17	24	−6	18
Marc-Edouard Vlasic	82	4	19	23	+11	40
Torrey Mitchell	76	9	10	19	−6	29
Andrew Desjardins	76	4	13	17	+4	47
Jason Demers	57	4	9	13	−8	22
Justin Braun	66	2	9	11	−2	23
Brad Winchester	67	6	4	10	−5	88
Tommy Wingels	33	3	6	9	−1	18
Benn Ferriero	35	7	1	8	0	8
Dominic Moore^{†}	23	0	6	6	−8	6
Daniel Winnik^{†}	21	3	2	5	0	10
Colin White	54	1	3	4	−5	21
Douglas Murray	60	0	4	4	+3	31
Jim Vandermeer	25	1	3	4	+3	33
Andrew Murray	39	1	3	4	+3	4
TJ Galiardi^{†}	14	1	0	1	−2	6
John McCarthy	10	0	0	0	−2	10
Frazer McLaren	7	0	0	0	0	9

Playoffs

Player	GP	G	A	Pts	+/−	PIM
Joe Thornton	5	2	3	5	+2	2
Logan Couture	5	1	3	4	−1	0
Martin Havlat	5	2	1	3	−1	8
Ryane Clowe	5	0	3	3	−3	0
Dan Boyle	5	0	2	2	0	4
Brent Burns	5	1	1	2	+2	4
Colin White	3	1	0	1	0	0
Torrey Mitchell	5	0	1	1	0	6
Daniel Winnik	5	0	1	1	+1	6
Andrew Desjardins	5	1	0	1	+1	2
Tommy Wingels	5	0	1	1	+1	7
Michal Handzus	2	0	0	0	0	0
Patrick Marleau	5	0	0	0	−1	4
Douglas Murray	5	0	0	0	−1	19
Brad Winchester	1	0	0	0	0	0
Dominic Moore	3	0	0	0	−1	5
Joe Pavelski	5	0	0	0	−3	5
Marc-Edouard Vlasic	5	0	0	0	−2	2
TJ Galiardi	3	0	0	0	−1	6
Justin Braun	5	0	0	0	−2	15
Jason Demers	3	0	0	0	−1	2

=== Goaltenders ===
GP = Games played; MIN = Time On Ice in minutes; W = Wins; L = Losses; OT = Overtime losses; GA = Goals against; GAA = Goals against average; SA = Shots against; SV = Saves; SV% = Save percentage; SO = Shutouts; G = Goals; A = Assists; PEN = Penalty Time in minutes

Regular season

Player	GP	MIN	W	L	OT	GA	GAA	SA	SV%	SO	G	A	PIM
Antti Niemi	68	3936	34	22	9	159	2.42	1865	.915	6	0	0	2
Thomas Greiss	19	1043	9	7	1	40	2.30	472	.915	0	0	0	2

Playoffs

Player	GP	Min	W	L	GA	GAA	SA	Sv%	SO	G	A	PIM
Antti Niemi	5	318	1	4	13	2.45	151	.914	0	0	0	0

^{†}Denotes player spent time with another team before joining Sharks. Stats reflect time with the Sharks only.
^{‡}Traded mid-season
Bold/italics denotes franchise record

== Awards, records, milestones ==
=== Awards ===
Regular Season
Player	Award	Awarded
Marc-Edouard Vlasic	NHL Second Star of the Week	November 21, 2011

=== Milestones ===
Regular Season
Player	Milestone	Reached
Tommy Wingels	1st Career NHL Assist; 1st Career NHL Point	October 8, 2011
Joe Thornton	1,000th Career NHL Game	October 21, 2011
Joe Thornton	700th Career NHL Assist	October 25, 2011
Marc-Edouard Vlasic	400th Career NHL Game	November 3, 2011
Marc-Edouard Vlasic	100th Career NHL Assist	November 20, 2011
Andrew Murray	200th Career NHL Game	November 23, 2011
Patrick Marleau	800th Career NHL Point	January 10, 2012
Tommy Wingels	1st Career NHL Goal	January 15, 2012
Brent Burns	200th Career NHL Point	January 17, 2012
Logan Couture	100th Career NHL Point	January 23, 2012
Dan Boyle	800th Career NHL Game	January 31, 2012
Brent Burns	500th Career NHL Game	January 31, 2012
Douglas Murray	400th Career NHL Game	January 31, 2012
Joe Pavelski	400th Career NHL Game	February 8, 2012
Michal Handzus	900th Career NHL Game	February 21, 2012
Patrick Marleau	1,100th Career NHL Game	March 8, 2012
Dan Boyle	500th Career NHL Point	March 26, 2012
Joe Pavelski	300th Career NHL Point	March 26, 2012
Ryan Clowe	100th Career NHL Goal	April 3, 2012
Daniel Winnik	100th Career NHL Point	April 3, 2012

== Transactions ==
The Sharks have been involved in the following transactions during the 2011–12 season.

=== Trades ===
Date	Details
June 24, 2011	To Minnesota Wild Charlie Coyle; Devin Setoguchi; 1st-round pick in 2011	To San Jose Sharks Brent Burns; 2nd-round pick in 2012
June 25, 2011	To Florida Panthers 2nd-round pick (59th overall) in 2011; 3rd-round pick in 2012	To San Jose Sharks 2nd-round pick (47th overall) in 2011
June 25, 2011	To Winnipeg Jets 4th-round pick in 2011	To San Jose Sharks 5th-round pick in 2011; 7th-round pick in 2011
July 3, 2011	To Minnesota Wild Dany Heatley	To San Jose Sharks Martin Havlat
August 7, 2011	To Minnesota Wild 3rd-round pick in 2013	To San Jose Sharks James Sheppard
January 26, 2012	To Florida Panthers Sean Sullivan	To San Jose Sharks Tim Kennedy
February 16, 2012	To Tampa Bay Lightning 2nd-round pick in 2012	To San Jose Sharks Dominic Moore; 7th-round pick in 2012
February 27, 2012	To Colorado Avalanche Jamie McGinn; Mike Connolly; Michael Sgarbossa	To San Jose Sharks TJ Galiardi; Daniel Winnik; 7th-round pick in 2013
June 10, 2012	To Detroit Red Wings Andrew Murray (Note: Trade of negotiating rights to.); Conditional 7th-round pick in 2014 (Note: Condition satisfied.)	To San Jose Sharks Brad Stuart (Note: Trade of negotiating rights to.)

=== Free agents signed ===
Player	Former team	Contract terms
Michal Handzus	Los Angeles Kings	2 years, $5 million
Jim Vandermeer	Edmonton Oilers	1 year, $1 million
Matt Pelech	Abbotsford Heat	1 year, $525,000
Ben Guite	Springfield Falcons	1 year, $525,000
Andrew Murray	Columbus Blue Jackets	1 year, $575,000
Colin White	New Jersey Devils	1 year, $1 million
Brad Winchester	Anaheim Ducks	1 year, $725,000
Sebastian Stalberg	University of Vermont	2 years, $1.51 million entry-level contract
Matt Tennyson	Western Michigan University	2 years, $1.85 million entry-level contract
Travis Oleksuk	University of Minnesota Duluth	2 years, $1.385 million entry-level contract

=== Free agents lost ===
Player	New team	Contract terms
Niclas Wallin	Lulea HF	1 year
Ben Eager	Edmonton Oilers	3 years, $3.3 million
Jamal Mayers	Chicago Blackhawks	1 year, $550,000
Ian White	Detroit Red Wings	2 years, $5.75 million
Kent Huskins	St. Louis Blues	1 year, $1 million
Scott Nichol	St. Louis Blues	1 year, $700,000
Kyle Wellwood	Winnipeg Jets	1 year, $700,000

=== Claimed via waivers ===
Player	Former team	Date claimed off waivers

=== Lost via waivers ===
Player	New team	Date claimed off waivers

=== Lost via retirement ===
Player

=== Player signings ===
Player	Date	Contract terms
Freddie Hamilton	May 27, 2011	3 years, $1.945 million entry-level contract
Devin Setoguchi	June 23, 2011	3 years, $9 million
Andrew Desjardins	June 27, 2011	1 year, $540,000
Alex Stalock	June 27, 2011	1 year, $625,000
Jamie McGinn	June 30, 2011	1 year, $680,000
Frazer McLaren	June 30, 2011	1 year, $575,000
Thomas Greiss	July 6, 2011	2 years, $1.175 million
Sean Sullivan	July 6, 2011	1 year, $525,000
Benn Ferriero	July 8, 2011	1 year, $605,000
Brent Burns	August 1, 2011	5 years, $28.8 million contract extension
Logan Couture	August 26, 2011	2 years, $5.75 million contract extension
Konrad Abeltshauser	April 13, 2012	3 years, $1.9 million entry-level contract
Dylan DeMelo	April 20, 2012	3 years, $1.975 million entry-level contract

== Draft picks ==
San Jose's picks at the 2011 NHL entry draft in St. Paul, Minnesota.

Round	#	Player	Position	Nationality	College/Junior/Club team (League)
2	47 (from Montreal)	Matt Nieto	LW	United States	Boston University (Hockey East)
3	89	Justin Sefton	D	Canada	Sudbury Wolves (OHL)
5	133 (from Carolina)	Sean Kuraly	C	United States	Indiana Ice (USHL)
6	166 (from NY Rangers)	Daniil Sobchenko	C	Russia	Lokomotiv Yaroslavl (KHL)
6	179	Dylan DeMelo	D	Canada	Mississauga St. Michael's Majors (OHL)
7	194 (from Calgary)	Colin Blackwell	C	United States	St. John's Preparatory School (USHS-MA)

== See also ==
- 2011–12 NHL season
