= 2011–12 Dallas Stars season =

National Hockey League team season

2011–12 Dallas Stars
- Division: 4th Pacific
- Conference: 10th Western
- 2011–12 record: 42–35–5
- Home record: 22–16–3
- Road record: 20–19–2
- Goals for: 211
- Goals against: 222

Team information
- General manager: Joe Nieuwendyk
- Coach: Glen Gulutzan
- Captain: Brenden Morrow
- Alternate captains: Loui Eriksson; Steve Ott; Stephane Robidas
- Arena: American Airlines Center
- Average attendance: 14,055 (75.8%)

Team leaders
- Goals: Michael Ryder (35)
- Assists: Loui Eriksson (42); Mike Ribeiro (42)
- Points: Loui Eriksson (68)
- Penalty minutes: Steve Ott (142)
- Plus/minus: Michael Ryder (17)
- Wins: Kari Lehtonen (31)
- Goals against average: Kari Lehtonen (2.23)

The 2011–12 Dallas Stars season was the 45th season (44th of play) for the National Hockey League (NHL) franchise that was established on June 5, 1967, and 19th season (18th of play) since the franchise relocated to Dallas to start the 1993–94 season.

The team failed to qualify for the Stanley Cup playoffs for the fourth year in a row. This was the second consecutive season that the Stars finished with a winning record of 42–35–5 but did not qualify for the playoffs, ending the season with 89 points in the standings and missing by six points and finishing 10th in the Western Conference.

== Off-Season ==
On June 17, 2011, the Stars officially announced the hiring of Glen Gulutzan to be their new head coach. Gulutzan had been the head coach of the Stars' American Hockey League affiliate, the Texas Stars.

== Regular season ==
The Stars' power play struggled during the regular season, as they finished 30th overall in power-play goals scored (33) and in power-play percentage (13.52%).

== Playoffs ==
The Stars failed to qualify for the 2012 Stanley Cup playoffs.

== Standings ==
Pacific Division
Pos	Team	GP	W	L	OTL	ROW	GF	GA	GD	Pts
1	y – Phoenix Coyotes	82	42	27	13	36	216	204	+12	97
2	x – San Jose Sharks	82	43	29	10	34	228	210	+18	96
3	x – Los Angeles Kings	82	40	27	15	34	194	179	+15	95
4	Dallas Stars	82	42	35	5	35	211	222	−11	89
5	Anaheim Ducks	82	34	36	12	31	204	231	−27	80

Source: National Hockey League
x – Clinched playoff spot; y – Clinched division

Western Conference
Pos	Div	Team	GP	W	L	OTL	ROW	GF	GA	GD	Pts
1	NW	p – Vancouver Canucks	82	51	22	9	43	249	198	+51	111
2	CE	y – St. Louis Blues	82	49	22	11	45	210	165	+45	109
3	PA	y – Phoenix Coyotes	82	42	27	13	36	216	204	+12	97
4	CE	x – Nashville Predators	82	48	26	8	43	237	210	+27	104
5	CE	x – Detroit Red Wings	82	48	28	6	39	248	203	+45	102
6	CE	x – Chicago Blackhawks	82	45	26	11	38	248	238	+10	101
7	PA	x – San Jose Sharks	82	43	29	10	34	228	210	+18	96
8	PA	x – Los Angeles Kings	82	40	27	15	34	194	179	+15	95
9	NW	Calgary Flames	82	37	29	16	34	202	226	−24	90
10	PA	Dallas Stars	82	42	35	5	35	211	222	−11	89
11	NW	Colorado Avalanche	82	41	35	6	32	208	220	−12	88
12	NW	Minnesota Wild	82	35	36	11	24	177	226	−49	81
13	PA	Anaheim Ducks	82	34	36	12	31	204	231	−27	80
14	NW	Edmonton Oilers	82	32	40	10	27	212	239	−27	74
15	CE	Columbus Blue Jackets	82	29	46	7	25	202	262	−60	65

Source: National Hockey League
p – Clinched Presidents' Trophy; x – Clinched playoff spot; y – Clinched division

== Schedule and results ==
=== Pre-season ===
2011 Pre-season game log
#	Date	Visitor	Score	Home	OT	Record	Recap
1	September 20	Dallas Stars	6–3	Montreal Canadiens		1–0	Recap
2	September 22	Colorado Avalanche	2–5	Dallas Stars		2–0	Recap
3	September 24	St. Louis Blues	2–3	Dallas Stars		3–0	Recap
4	September 25	Dallas Stars	0–3	Colorado Avalanche		3–1	Recap
5	September 27	Dallas Stars	4–3	Florida Panthers	OT	4–1	Recap
6	September 29	Florida Panthers	1–7	Dallas Stars		5–1	Recap
7	October 1	Dallas Stars	4–0	St. Louis Blues		6–1	Recap

=== Regular season ===
2011–12 Game Log

October: 8–3–0 (Home: 5–1–0; Road: 3–2–0)
#	Date	Visitor	Score	Home	OT	Decision	Attendance	Record	Pts	Recap
1	October 7	Chicago Blackhawks	1–2	Dallas Stars		Lehtonen 1–0–0	15,285	1–0–0	2	Recap
2	October 8	Dallas Stars	2–5	Chicago Blackhawks		Raycroft 0–1–0	21,674	1–1–0	2	Recap
3	October 10	Phoenix Coyotes	1–2	Dallas Stars	SO	Lehtonen 2–0–0	6,306	2–1–0	4	Recap
4	October 13	St. Louis Blues	2–3	Dallas Stars		Lehtonen 3–0–0	7,949	3–1–0	6	Recap
5	October 15	Columbus Blue Jackets	2–4	Dallas Stars		Lehtonen 4–0–0	8,305	4–1–0	8	Recap
6	October 18	Dallas Stars	3–2	Columbus Blue Jackets		Lehtonen 5–0–0	9,158	5–1–0	10	Recap
7	October 21	Dallas Stars	3–1	Anaheim Ducks		Lehtonen 6–0–0	12,919	6–1–0	12	Recap
8	October 22	Dallas Stars	0–1	Los Angeles Kings		Raycroft 0–2–0	18,118	6–2–0	12	Recap
9	October 25	Dallas Stars	3–2	Phoenix Coyotes	SO	Lehtonen 7–0–0	6,948	7–2–0	14	Recap
10	October 27	Los Angeles Kings	5–3	Dallas Stars		Lehtonen 7–1–0	8,443	7–3–0	14	Recap
11	October 29	New Jersey Devils	1 -3	Dallas Stars		Lehtonen 8–1–0	11,740	8–3–0	16	Recap

November: 6–6–1 (Home: 3–2–1; Road: 3–4–0)
#	Date	Visitor	Score	Home	OT	Decision	Attendance	Record	Pts	Recap
12	November 4	Colorado Avalanche	6–7	Dallas Stars		Lehtonen 9–1–0	11,981	9–3–0	18	Recap
13	November 6	Dallas Stars	5–2	Carolina Hurricanes		Lehtonen 10–1–0	14,815	10–3–0	20	Recap
14	November 8	Dallas Stars	5–2	Washington Capitals		Lehtonen 11–1–0	18,506	11–3–0	22	Recap
15	November 11	Dallas Stars	1–3	Pittsburgh Penguins		Lehtonen 11–2–0	18,585	11–4–0	22	Recap
16	November 12	Dallas Stars	2–5	Detroit Red Wings		Raycroft 0–3–0	20,066	11–5–0	22	Recap
17	November 15	Florida Panthers	6–0	Dallas Stars		Lehtonen 11–3–0	10,175	11–6–0	22	Recap
18	November 18	Dallas Stars	0–3	Colorado Avalanche		Lehtonen 11–4–0	16,091	11–7–0	22	Recap
19	November 19	San Jose Sharks	4–1	Dallas Stars		Raycroft 0–4–0	13,711	11–8–0	22	Recap
20	November 21	Edmonton Oilers	1–4	Dallas Stars		Lehtonen 12–4–0	11,458	12–8–0	24	Recap
21	November 23	Los Angeles Kings	2–3	Dallas Stars	OT	Lehtonen 13–4–0	11,779	13–8–0	26	Recap
22	November 25	Toronto Maple Leafs	4–3	Dallas Stars	SO	Lehtonen 13–4–1	18,532	13–8–1	27	Recap
23	November 26	Dallas Stars	0–3	Phoenix Coyotes		Raycroft 0–5–0	10,036	13–9–1	27	Recap
24	November 28	Dallas Stars	3–1	Colorado Avalanche		Raycroft 1–5–0	12,015	14–9–1	29	Recap

December: 7–6–0 (Home: 4–3–0; Road: 3–3–0)
#	Date	Visitor	Score	Home	OT	Decision	Attendance	Record	Pts	Recap
25	December 1	Ottawa Senators	2–3	Dallas Stars		Raycroft 2–5–0	10,490	15–9–1	31	Recap
26	December 3	New York Islanders	5–4	Dallas Stars		Raycroft 2–6–0	14,423	15–10–1	31	Recap
27	December 8	Dallas Stars	2–5	San Jose Sharks		Raycroft 2–7–0	17,562	15–11–1	31	Recap
28	December 10	Dallas Stars	2–1	Los Angeles Kings		Bachman 1–0–0	18,118	16–11–1	33	Recap
29	December 13	Dallas Stars	1–0	New York Rangers		Bachman 2–0–0	18,200	17–11–1	35	Recap
30	December 15	Dallas Stars	3–2	New York Islanders		Bachman 3–0–0	9,288	18–11–1	37	Recap
31	December 16	Dallas Stars	3–6	New Jersey Devils		Bachman 3–1–0	17,625	18–12–1	37	Recap
32	December 19	Anaheim Ducks	3–5	Dallas Stars		Bachman 4–1–0	13,720	19–12–1	39	Recap
33	December 21	Philadelphia Flyers	4–1	Dallas Stars		Bachman 4–2–0	15,061	19–13–1	39	Recap
34	December 23	Nashville Predators	3–6	Dallas Stars		Bachman 5–2–0	15,245	20–13–1	41
35	December 26	Dallas Stars	3–5	St. Louis Blues		Raycroft 2–8–0	18,842	20–14–1	41	Recap
36	December 29	Columbus Blue Jackets	4–1	Dallas Stars		Lehtonen 13–5–1	16,555	20–15–1	41	Recap
37	December 31	Boston Bruins	2–4	Dallas Stars		Lehtonen 14–5–1	18,532	21–15–1	43	Recap

January: 4–6–1 (Home: 2–3–1; Road: 2–3–0)
#	Date	Visitor	Score	Home	OT	Decision	Attendance	Record	Pts	Recap
38	January 3	Detroit Red Wings	5–4	Dallas Stars		Lehtonen 14–6–1	15,182	21–16–1	43	Recap
39	January 5	Dallas Stars	4–1	Nashville Predators		Lehtonen 15–6–1	17,113	22–16–1	45	Recap
40	January 7	Edmonton Oilers	1–4	Dallas Stars		Bachman 6-2-0	16,122	23-16-1	47	Recap
41	January 10	Dallas Stars	2–5	Anaheim Ducks		Lehtonen 15-7-1	12,152	23-17-1	47	Recap
42	January 12	Dallas Stars	5–4	Los Angeles Kings	SO	Lehtonen 16-7-1	18,118	24-17-1	49	Recap
43	January 14	Colorado Avalanche	2–1	Dallas Stars		Lehtonen 16-8-1	15,838	24-18-1	49	Recap
44	January 16	Dallas Stars	0–1	St. Louis Blues		Lehtonen 16-9-1	18,036	24-19-1	49	Recap
45	January 17	Detroit Red Wings	3–2	Dallas Stars	SO	Bachman 6-2-1	15,148	24-19-2	50	Recap
46	January 20	Tampa Bay Lightning	2–1	Dallas Stars		Lehtonen 16-10-1	14,836	24-20-2	50	Recap
47	January 21	Dallas Stars	2–5	Minnesota Wild		Lehtonen 16-11-1	19,213	24-21-2	50	Recap
48	January 24	Anaheim Ducks	0–1	Dallas Stars		Lehtonen 17-11-1	12,141	25-21-2	52	Recap

February: 8–5–3 (Home: 4–3–1; Road: 4–2–2)
#	Date	Visitor	Score	Home	OT	Decision	Attendance	Record	Pts	Recap
49	February 1	Dallas Stars	6–2	Anaheim Ducks		Lehtonen 18-11-1	12,701	26-21-2	54	Recap
50	February 2	Dallas Stars	2–5	San Jose Sharks		Bachman 6-3-1	17,562	26-22-2	54	Recap
51	February 4	Minnesota Wild	1–2	Dallas Stars	SO	Lehtonen 19-11-1	18,532	27-22-2	56	Recap
52	February 7	Phoenix Coyotes	4–1	Dallas Stars		Lehtonen 19-12-1	11,162	27-23-2	56	Recap
53	February 9	Dallas Stars	4–2	Columbus Blue Jackets		Lehtonen 20-12-1	15,943	28-23-2	58	Recap
54	February 10	Dallas Stars	2–3	Buffalo Sabres	SO	Lehtonen 20-12-2	18,690	28-23-3	59	Recap
55	February 12	Los Angeles Kings	4–2	Dallas Stars		Lehtonen 20-13-2	12-191	28-24-3	59	Recap
56	February 14	Dallas Stars	1–3	Detroit Red Wings		Lehtonen 20-14-2	20,066	28-25-3	59	Recap
57	February 16	Calgary Flames	2–3	Dallas Stars	OT	Lehtonen 21-14-2	11,839	29-25-3	61	Recap
58	February 18	Dallas Stars	1–2	Phoenix Coyotes	OT	Lehtonen 21-14-3	16,604	29-25-4	62	Recap
59	February 19	Nashville Predators	3–2	Dallas Stars		Lehtonen 21-15-3	11,865	29-26-4	62	Recap
60	February 21	Dallas Stars	3–0	Montreal Canadiens		Lehtonen 22-15-3	21,273	30-26-4	64	Recap
61	February 23	Dallas Stars	3–1	Chicago Blackhawks		Bachman 7-3-1	21,659	31-26-4	66	Recap
62	February 24	Minnesota Wild	1–4	Dallas Stars		Lehtonen 23-15-3	13,144	32-26-4	68	Recap
63	February 26	Vancouver Canucks	2–3	Dallas Stars	OT	Lehtonen 24-15-3	18,010	33-26-4	70	Recap
64	February 29	Pittsburgh Penguins	4–3	Dallas Stars	SO	Lehtonen 24-15-4	17,455	33-26-5	71	Recap

March: 9–6–0 (Home: 4–2–0; Road: 5–4–0)
#	Date	Visitor	Score	Home	OT	Decision	Attendance	Record	Pts	Recap
65	March 2	Dallas Stars	3–1	Edmonton Oilers		Lehtonen 25-15-4	16,839	34-26-5	73	Recap
66	March 4	Dallas Stars	3–2	Calgary Flames	SO	Lehtonen 26-15-4	19,289	35-26-5	75	Recap
67	March 6	Dallas Stars	5–2	Vancouver Canucks		Bachman 8-3-1	18,890	36-26-5	77	Recap
68	March 8	San Jose Sharks	3–4	Dallas Stars	SO	Lehtonen 27-15-4	16,812	37-26-5	79	Recap
69	March 10	Anaheim Ducks	0–2	Dallas Stars		Lehtonen 28-15-4	18,228	38-26-5	81	Recap
70	March 13	Dallas Stars	1–0	Minnesota Wild		Lehtonen 29-15-4	17,326	39-26-5	83	Recap
71	March 14	Dallas Stars	2–5	Winnipeg Jets		Bachman 8-4-1	15,004	39-27-5	83	Recap
72	March 16	Chicago Blackhawks	4–1	Dallas Stars		Lehtonen 29-16-4	19,099	39-28-5	83	Recap
73	March 20	Phoenix Coyotes	3–4	Dallas Stars	SO	Lehtonen 30-16-4	17,012	40-28-5	85	Recap
74	March 22	Vancouver Canucks	2–1	Dallas Stars		Lehtonen 30-17-4	16,618	40-29-5	85	Recap
75	March 24	Calgary Flames	1–4	Dallas Stars		Lehtonen 31-17-4	17,238	41-29-5	87	Recap
76	March 26	Dallas Stars	4–5	Calgary Flames		Lehtonen 31-18-4	19,289	41-30-5	87	Recap
77	March 28	Dallas Stars	3–1	Edmonton Oilers		Lehtonen 32-18-4	16,839	42-30-5	89	Recap
78	March 30	Dallas Stars	2–5	Vancouver Canucks		Lehtonen 32-19-4	18,890	42-31-5	89	Recap
79	March 31	Dallas Stars	0–3	San Jose Sharks		Lehtonen 32-20-4	17,562	42-32-5	89	Recap

April: 0–3–0 (Home: 0–2–0; Road: 0–1–0)
#	Date	Visitor	Score	Home	OT	Decision	Attendance	Record	Pts	Recap
80	April 3	San Jose Sharks	5–2	Dallas Stars		Lehtonen 32-21-4	18,584	42-33-5	89	Recap
81	April 5	Dallas Stars	0–3	Nashville Predators		Lehtonen 32-22-4	17,113	42-34-5	89	Recap
82	April 7	St. Louis Blues	3–2	Dallas Stars		Bachman 8-5-1	16,560	42-35-5	89	Recap

Legend: Win (2 points) Loss (0 points) Overtime/shootout loss (1 point)

== Player statistics ==
=== Skaters ===
Note: GP = Games played; G = Goals; A = Assists; Pts = Points; +/− = Plus/minus; PIM = Penalty minutes

Regular season

Player	GP	G	A	Pts	+/−	PIM
Loui Eriksson	82	26	45	71	18	12
Mike Ribeiro	74	18	45	63	5	66
Jamie Benn	71	26	37	63	15	55
Michael Ryder	82	35	27	62	17	46
Steve Ott	74	11	28	39	5	156
Alex Goligoski	71	9	21	30	0	16
Brenden Morrow	57	11	15	26	1	97
Trevor Daley	79	4	21	25	3	42
Stephane Robidas	75	5	17	22	-5	48
Sheldon Souray	64	6	15	21	11	73
Radek Dvorak	73	4	17	21	−16	12
Vernon Fiddler	82	8	13	21	−13	60
Eric Nystrom	74	16	5	21	−10	24
Adam Burish	65	6	13	19	6	76
Tom Wandell	72	6	9	15	−5	16
Philip Larsen	55	3	8	11	11	16
Tomas Vincour	47	4	6	10	−2	2
Jake Dowell	52	2	5	7	−3	53
Toby Petersen	39	2	3	5	−7	6
Adam Pardy	36	0	3	3	−5	16
Ryan Garbutt	20	2	1	3	-1	22
Mark Fistric	60	0	2	2	−3	41
Jordie Benn	3	0	2	2	1	0
Francis Wathier	1	0	0	0	0	0
Scott Glennie	1	0	0	0	0	2
Reilly Smith	3	0	0	0	-3	2
Brenden Dillon	1	0	0	0	0	0
Matt Fraser	1	0	0	0	0	0

=== Goaltenders ===
Note: GP = Games played; TOI = Time on ice (minutes); W = Wins; L = Losses; OT = Overtime losses; GA = Goals against; GAA= Goals against average; SA= Shots against; SV= Saves; Sv% = Save percentage; SO= Shutouts

Regular season

Player	GP	TOI	W	L	OT	GA	GAA	SA	Sv%	SO	G	A	PIM
Kari Lehtonen	59	3497	32	22	4	136	2.33	1739	.922	4	0	3	0
Richard Bachman	18	933	8	5	1	43	2.77	477	.910	1	0	1	0
Andrew Raycroft	10	529	2	8	0	31	3.52	303	.898	0	0	0	0

^{†}Denotes player spent time with another team before joining Stars. Stats reflect time spent with the Stars only.
^{‡}Traded mid-season
Bold/italics denotes franchise record

== Awards and records ==
=== Awards ===
Regular Season
Player	Award	Awarded
Kari Lehtonen	NHL Third Star of the Week	October 17, 2011
Kari Lehtonen	NHL Second Star of the Month	October 2011
Loui Eriksson	NHL Second Star of the Week	November 7, 2011
Kari Lehtonen	NHL Third Star of the Week	February 27, 2012

=== Milestones ===
Regular Season
Player	Milestone	Reached
Trevor Daley	500th Career NHL Game	October 8, 2011
Mark Fistric	200th Career NHL Game	October 10, 2011
Jamie Benn	100th Career NHL Point	October 15, 2011
Mike Ribeiro	500th Career NHL Point	October 15, 2011
Steve Ott	500th Career NHL Game	October 22, 2011
Sheldon Souray	100th Career NHL Goal	November 4, 2011
Trevor Daley	100th Career NHL Assist	November 12, 2011
Kari Lehtonen	300th Career NHL Game	November 18, 2011
Eric Nystrom	300th Career NHL Game	November 19, 2011
Brenden Morrow	500th Career NHL Point	November 21, 2011
Nicklas Grossmann	300th Career NHL Game	November 25, 2011
Richard Bachman	1st Career NHL Win	December 10, 2011
Richard Bachman	1st Career NHL Shutout	December 13, 2011
Loui Eriksson	400th Career NHL Game	December 13, 2011
Mike Ribeiro	700th Career NHL Game	December 31, 2011
Jordie Benn	1st Career NHL Game; 1st Career NHL Assist; 1st Career NHL Point	January 3, 2012
Steve Ott	200th Career NHL Point	January 10, 2012
Loui Eriksson	300th Career NHL Point	January 21, 2012
Philip Larsen	1st Career NHL Goal	January 21, 2012
Vernon Fiddler	500th Career NHL Game	January 24, 2012
Matt Fraser	1st Career NHL Game	January 24, 2012
Michael Ryder	600th Career NHL Game	February 4, 2012
Jamie Benn	200th Career NHL Game	February 10, 2012
Ryan Garbutt	1st Career NHL Game	February 18, 2012
Ryan Garbutt	1st Career NHL Goal; 1st Career NHL Point	February 21, 2012
Sheldon Souray	700th Career NHL Game	February 26, 2012
Tom Wandell	200th Career NHL Game	March 4, 2012
Ryan Garbutt	1st Career NHL Assist	March 8, 2012
Brenden Morrow	800th Career NHL Game	March 26, 2012
Reilly Smith	1st Career NHL Game	March 28, 2012
Brenden Dillon	1st Career NHL Game	April 7, 2012
Scott Glennie	1st Career NHL Game	April 7, 2012

== Transactions ==
The Stars have been involved in the following transactions during the 2011–12 season:

=== Trades ===
Date	Details
October 12, 2011	To Minnesota Wild Future considerations	To Dallas Stars Eric Nystrom
December 7, 2011	To Florida Panthers Krys Barch; 6th-round pick in 2012	To Dallas Stars Jake Hauswirth; 5th-round pick in 2012
January 13, 2012	To Florida Panthers Ondrej Roman	To Dallas Stars Angelo Esposito
February 16, 2012	To Philadelphia Flyers Nicklas Grossmann	To Dallas Stars 2nd-round pick in 2012; 3rd-round pick in 2013

=== Free agents signed ===
Player	Former team	Contract terms
Dan Spang	Texas Stars	1 year, $525,000
Michael Ryder	Boston Bruins	2 years, $7 million
Radek Dvorak	Atlanta Thrashers	1 year, $1.5 million
Vernon Fiddler	Phoenix Coyotes	3 years, $5.4 million
Adam Pardy	Calgary Flames	2 years, $4 million
Sheldon Souray	Edmonton Oilers	1 year, $1.65 million
Jake Dowell	Chicago Blackhawks	1 year, $800,000
Jordie Benn	Texas Stars	1 year, $550,000 entry-level contract
Ryan Garbutt	Chicago Wolves	1 year, $590,000
Eric Godard	Pittsburgh Penguins	2 years, $1.45 million
Mike Modano	Detroit Red Wings	1 day, $999,999
Cristopher Nihlstorp	Farjestad BK	1 year, $1 million

=== Free agents lost ===
Player	New team	Contract terms
Brad Richards	New York Rangers	9 years, $58.5 million
Aaron Gagnon	Winnipeg Jets	2 years, $1.125 million
Jamie Langenbrunner	St. Louis Blues	1 year, $2.8 million
Jason Williams	Pittsburgh Penguins	1 year, $600,000
Sean Backman	New York Islanders	1 year, $525,000
Jeff Woywitka	Montreal Canadiens	1 year, $650,000
Brandon Segal	Chicago Blackhawks	1 year, $525,000

=== Claimed via waivers ===
Player	Former team	Date claimed off waivers

=== Lost via waivers ===
Player	New team	Date claimed off waivers

=== Lost via retirement ===
Player
Mike Modano

=== Player signings ===
Player	Date	Contract terms
John Klingberg	May 16, 2011	3 years, $2.23 million entry-level contract
Travis Morin	June 9, 2011	2 years, $1.05 million
Colton Sceviour	June 9, 2011	1 year, $525,000
Richard Bachman	June 16, 2011	1 year, $550,000
Brad Lukowich	June 28, 2011	1 year, $1 million
Raymond Sawada	July 19, 2011	1 year, $600,000
Jamie Oleksiak	October 6, 2011	3 years, $2.775 million entry-level contract
Alex Goligoski	January 23, 2012	4 years, $18.4 million contract extension
Austin Smith	March 21, 2012	2 years, $1.75 million entry-level contract
Reilly Smith	March 25, 2012	3 years, $2.7 million entry-level contract
Alex Chiasson	March 26, 2012	3 years, $2.6 million entry-level contract
Matej Stransky	April 2, 2012	3 years, $1.875 million entry-level contract
Francis Wathier	June 13, 2012	2 years, $1.15 million
Jyrki Jokipakka	June 14, 2012	3 years, $2 million entry-level contract
Emil Molin	June 15, 2012	3 years, $2.07 million entry-level contract

== Draft picks ==
The Stars' picks at the 2011 NHL entry draft in St. Paul, Minnesota.

Round	#	Player	Position	Nationality	College/Junior/Club team (League)
1	14	Jamie Oleksiak	D	Canada	Northeastern University (Hockey East)
2	44	Brett Ritchie	RW	Canada	Sarnia Sting (OHL)
4	105	Emil Molin	C	Sweden	Brynas IF Jr. (J20 SuperElit)
5	135	Troy Vance	D	United States	Victoriaville Tigres (QMJHL)
6	165	Matej Stransky	RW	Czech Republic	Saskatoon Blades (WHL)
7	195	Jyrki Jokipakka	D	Finland	Ilves (SM-liiga)

== See also ==
- 2011–12 NHL season
