= 2011–12 Anaheim Ducks season =

Professional ice hockey team season

2011–12 Anaheim Ducks
- Division: 5th Pacific
- Conference: 13th Western
- 2011–12 record: 34–36–12
- Home record: 21–18–2
- Road record: 13–18–10
- Goals for: 206
- Goals against: 236

Team information
- General manager: Bob Murray
- Coach: Randy Carlyle (Oct.–Nov.); Bruce Boudreau (Nov.–Apr.)
- Captain: Ryan Getzlaf
- Alternate captains: Saku Koivu; Teemu Selanne
- Arena: Honda Center
- Average attendance: 14,760 (86.4%)

Team leaders
- Goals: Corey Perry (37)
- Assists: Ryan Getzlaf (46)
- Points: Teemu Selanne (66)
- Penalty minutes: Corey Perry (127)
- Plus/minus: Sheldon Brookbank (+11)
- Wins: Jonas Hiller (29)
- Goals against average: Jonas Hiller (2.57)

The 2011–12 Anaheim Ducks season was the 19th season of operation (18th season of play) for the National Hockey League (NHL) franchise. Their first game of the season was held on October 7, 2011, against the Buffalo Sabres in Helsinki, Finland. The Ducks had a disappointing season compared to 2010–11, struggling in the first half of the season and digging a hole that was too deep to climb out of despite a second-half resurgence. 2011–12 marked the second playoff miss for the Ducks in three seasons. The Ducks ultimately finished the season in 13th place in the Western Conference with a 34–36–12 record.

== Off-season ==
While the Anaheim Ducks entered the 2011 off-season with no major free agent challenges, the franchise did indeed have some question marks heading into the 2011–12 season. The biggest question on the ice was whether superstar Teemu Selanne would retire. The 40-year-old was incredibly successful in the 2010–11 season, averaging over a point per game, however, his age and length of his career (18 NHL seasons) was a factor. The Ducks' off-season started with the NHL entry draft, where Anaheim took Rickard Rakell in the first round (30th overall), John Gibson in the second round (39th overall) and traded for Andrew Cogliano from the Edmonton Oilers, subsequently signing him to a three-year contract. Head coach Randy Carlyle also signed a contract extension of three years after guiding the Ducks to their first Stanley Cup championship in 2007 and into the playoffs every season since he took the helm, save for the 2009–10 season. On the retirement front, the Ducks lost long-time, third-line center Todd Marchant to retirement on June 29, 2011, and on the same day, former Ducks captain Paul Kariya announced his retirement, quelling any rumors that he may return to the franchise he helped build. Other than a few transactions, the summer for Anaheim was relatively quiet, with most of the talk concerning the health of goaltender Jonas Hiller and whether Teemu Selanne will return for another season. Hiller was reported to be symptom-free as of August 19, and was expected to arrive at the Ducks' training camp on time in September. Selanne announced his return on September 15 after undergoing successful knee surgery early in the summer.

Early in September, the 2011 Lokomotiv Yaroslavl plane crash rocked the hockey world when a plane carrying the Lokomotiv Yaroslavl team of the Kontinental Hockey League (KHL) crashed. The team featured multiple NHL prospects and former NHL stars, including former Mighty Duck Ruslan Salei. Salei had been a mainstay in the Anaheim organization for many years and a small memorial was erected in front of Honda Center by Ducks fans to remember him immediately after news of his passing became public.

=== Business and arena ===
On the business side, the Sacramento Kings of the National Basketball Association (NBA) expressed interest in moving to Honda Center, the Ducks' home arena. The team had until May 2, 2011, to file for relocation to play in Anaheim for the 2011–12 season. Ducks owners Henry and Susan Samueli have been trying to lure an NBA team to Honda Center since they purchased the team, mainly due to the prospective positive impact the team would have on the Ducks' finances and the finances of the Samueli family-owned Anaheim Arena Management. It was announced on May 2, however, that the Kings would remain in the city of Sacramento for at least one more season. Even though the Ducks remained the sole tenants of Honda Center at least through to the 2011–12 season, the Anaheim Ducks and Anaheim Arena Management announced that they would be doing a major upgrade to the arena in mid-June 2011. The upgrade is set to include the construction of a new restaurant, an expanded club area, a grand terrace, a new east entrance and a larger team merchandise store, with the cost of the project reportedly in the tens of millions of dollars. The Ducks also announced ticket prices for individual games would be reduced in order to take advantage of an "all-in" pricing mechanism.

== Regular season ==
See the game log below for detailed game-by-game regular season information.

The 2011–12 Anaheim Ducks regular season schedule was released on June 23, 2011, and, as expected, the Ducks started their season as part of the NHL Premiere in Helsinki, Finland, on October 7. Their first home game was on October 14 against their in-state rivals, the San Jose Sharks. Anaheim's first actual road game was on October 17 against the Sharks at HP Pavilion. Their longest homestand was from December 29 to January 10 (six home games), and their longest road trip was from February 10 to 23 (eight road games). Their final game of the regular season was on April 7 at the Calgary Flames.

The Ducks struggled in the first half of the season, posting 18 points and a record of 6–20–6 over 32 games from October 21 to January 4, including a poor three-point, 1–8–1 stretch from November 5 to 27 that ultimately led to a coaching change. Beginning on January 6, the team embarked on a turnaround, accumulating 38 points over a 24-game span and having one of the NHL's best records for games played from January through mid-February. However, beginning on February 27, Anaheim proceeded to fall into another frustrating 5–8–1 ditch that ultimately would eliminate them from the playoff hunt. The Ducks were mathematically eliminated from playoff contention on March 28, at which point the Ducks only had 10 points up for grabs through the remainder of the season, and 11 points separated them from the last playoff spot. Anaheim's season ended on April 7 with a 5–2 loss to Calgary. Starting goaltender Jonas Hiller finished 2011–12 with a 29–30–12 record and with a 2.57 goals against average (GAA).

=== October ===
- October 7: The Ducks opened the season as part of the NHL Premiere in Ducks star Teemu Selanne's native Finland, losing 4–1 to Buffalo.
- October 8: Second game of the premiere in Stockholm, Sweden, a 2–1 victory over the New York Rangers.
- October 14: The Ducks home opener against rival San Jose; a 1–0 triumph. The Ducks previously opened against the Sharks during the 2009–10 season.
- October 29: The Ducks faced the team that eliminated them in the 2011 Stanley Cup playoffs (Nashville) for the first time of the season at Bridgestone Arena and lost 3–0

=== November ===
- November 16: The first game of the Freeway Face-Off series began against arch-rival Los Angeles at Staples Center; Anaheim lost 2–1.
- November 25: For the fourth year in a row, the Ducks faced the Chicago Blackhawks at home on the day after Thanksgiving, losing 6–5.
- November 30: After snapping their seven-game winless streak against the Montreal Canadiens, the Ducks organization relieved Head Coach Randy Carlyle of his duties and hired former Washington Capitals Head Coach Bruce Boudreau to replace him.

=== December ===
- December 17: The Ducks visited the newly reincarnated Winnipeg Jets for the first time, losing 5–3. It was also current Ducks star and former Winnipeg Jets star Teemu Selanne's first regular season game in Winnipeg since he was traded to the Ducks in 1996.
- December 29: The Ducks' longest homestand (six games) began. The Ducks went 3–3–0 during this homestand.
- December 31: Jean-Sebastien Giguere made his first visit to Honda Center since being traded from the Ducks as a member of the Colorado Avalanche, defeating his former team 4–2.

=== January ===
- January 29: The 2012 All-Star Game took place in Ottawa, Ontario. (Team Chara defeated Team Alfredsson 12–9).

=== February ===
- February 10: The Ducks' longest road trip (eight games) began. The team went 5–1–2 over this trip.

=== March ===
- March 25: The Ducks hosted the defending Stanley Cup champion Boston Bruins at Honda Center. The only meeting between the two teams during the 2011–12 season, goaltender Marty Turco led Boston to a 3–2 defeat of Anaheim.

=== April ===
- April 7: The final game of the regular season took place against the Calgary Flames at the Scotiabank Saddledome, with the Ducks closing out the season with a 5–2 defeat.

== Playoffs ==
The Ducks failed to qualify for the 2012 Stanley Cup playoffs.

== Schedule and results ==
=== Pre-season ===
The 2011 Anaheim Ducks participated in seven pre-season games and one exhibition game against Jokerit before the 2011–12 regular season.

2011 Preseason Game Log
September: 3–4–0 (Home: 1–3–0; Road: 2–1–0)

#	Date	Opponent	Score	OT	Win	Loss	Attendance	Record	Arena	Box
1	September 20	Coyotes	7–4		Visentin (1–0–0)	Gibson (0–1–0)	12,544	0–1–0	Honda Center	L1
2	September 21	Sharks	6–1		Greiss (1–0–0)	Deslauriers (0–1–0)	13,494	0–2–0	Honda Center	L2
3	September 23	@ Sharks	5–1		Greiss (2–0–0)	Ellis (0–1–0)	16,541	0–3–0	HP Pavilion at San Jose	L3
4	September 24	@ Canucks	4–1		Hiller (1–0–0)	Schneider (0–1–0)	18,860	1–3–0	Rogers Arena	W1
5	September 25	@ Kings	3–1		Deslauriers (1–1–0)	Quick (0–1–0)	14,103	2–3–0	Staples Center	W2
6	September 28	Canucks	3–2		Hiller (2–0–0)	Luongo (0–1–0)	13,542	3–3–0	Honda Center	W3
7	September 30	Kings	3–1		Bernier (2–0–1)	Ellis (0–2–0)	16,927	3–4–0	Honda Center	L1

October: 1–0–0 (Home: 0–0–0; Road: 1–0–0)

#	Date	Opponent	Score	OT	Win	Loss	Attendance	Record	Arena	Box
8	October 4	@ Jokerit	4–3	OT	Hiller (3–0–0)	Tuohimaa (0–1–0)	13,349	4–4–0	Hartwall Areena (in Helsinki, FIN)	W1

Final Games Legend
Ducks win	Ducks loss	OT loss

=== Regular season ===
2011–12 Game Log
October: 5–5–1 (Home: 2–2–0; Road: 2–2–1; Neutral: 1–1–0)

#	Date	Opponent	Score	OT	Win	Loss	Attendance	Record	Arena	Box	Points
1	October 7*	vs. Sabres	4–1		Miller (1–0–0)	Hiller (0–1–0)	13,349	0–1–0	Hartwall Areena (in Helsinki)	L1	0
2	October 8*	vs. Rangers	2–1	SO	Hiller (1–1–0)	Lundqvist (0–0–2)	13,800	1–1–0	Ericsson Globe (in Stockholm)	W1	2
3	October 14	Sharks	1–0		Hiller (2–1–0)	Greiss (1–1–0)	17,243	2–1–0	Honda Center	W2	4
4	October 16	Blues	4–2		Hiller (3–1–0)	Halak (1–3–0)	14,555	3–1–0	Honda Center	W3	6
5	October 17	@ Sharks	3–2		Ellis (1–0–0)	Niemi (0–1–0)	17,562	4–1–0	HP Pavilion at San Jose	W4	8
6	October 21	Stars	3–1		Lehtonen (6–0–0)	Hiller (3–2–0)	12,919	4–2–0	Honda Center	L1	8
7	October 23	Coyotes	5–4		Smith (2–2–1)	Hiller (3–3–0)	13,240	4–3–0	Honda Center	L2	8
8	October 25	@ Blackhawks	3–2	SO	Crawford (4–1–2)	Hiller (3–3–1)	21,247	4–3–1	United Center	O1	9
9	October 27	@ Wild	3–2		Hiller (4–3–1)	Backstrom (3–3–2)	15,723	5–3–1	Xcel Energy Center	W1	11
10	October 29	@ Predators	3–0		Rinne (5–4–1)	Hiller (4–4–1)	16,395	5–4–1	Bridgestone Arena	L1	11
11	October 30	@ Blue Jackets	3–1		Mason (2–8–1)	Ellis (1–1–0)	16,022	5–5–1	Nationwide Arena	L2	11
*The Sabres were designated the home team on October 7 in Helsinki and the Ducks were designated the home team on October 8 in Stockholm.

November: 2–8–3 (Home: 2–5–0; Road: 0–1–3)

#	Date	Opponent	Score	OT	Win	Loss	Attendance	Record	Arena	Box	Points
12	November 1	@ Capitals	5–4	OT	Vokoun (7–1–0)	Hiller (4–4–2)	18,506	5–5–2	Verizon Center	O1	12
13	November 3	@ Rangers	2–1	SO	Lundqvist (3–3–3)	Hiller (4–4–3)	18,200	5–5–3	Madison Square Garden	O2	13
14	November 5	@ Red Wings	5–0		Howard (5–3–1)	Hiller (4–5–3)	20,066	5–6–3	Joe Louis Arena	L1	13
15	November 9	Predators	4–2		Rinne (8–4–2)	Hiller (4–6–3)	13,529	5–7–3	Honda Center	L2	13
16	November 11	Canucks	4–3		Hiller (5–6–3)	Luongo (6–5–1)	17,339	6–7–3	Honda Center	W1	15
17	November 13	Wild	3–2		Backstrom (5–4–2)	Hiller (5–7–3)	13,803	6–8–3	Honda Center	L1	15
18	November 16	@ Kings	2–1	SO	Quick (8–4–3)	Hiller (5–7–4)	18,118	6–8–4	Staples Center	O1	16
19	November 17	Kings	5–3		Quick (9–4–3)	Ellis (1–2–0)	15,412	6–9–4	Honda Center	L1	16
20	November 20	Red Wings	4–2		Howard (10–5–1)	Hiller (5–8–4)	17,229	6–10–4	Honda Center	L2	16
21	November 23	@ Coyotes	4–2		Smith (10–3–3)	Hiller (5–9–4)	9,124	6–11–4	Jobing.com Arena	L3	16
22	November 25	Blackhawks	6–5		Crawford (10–6–2)	Ellis (1–3–0)	17,174	6–12–4	Honda Center	L4	16
23	November 27	Maple Leafs	5–2		Gustavsson (8–4–0)	Hiller (5–10–4)	13,685	6–13–4	Honda Center	L5	16
24	November 30	Canadiens	4–1		Hiller (6–10–4)	Budaj (1–3–0)	13,237	7–13–4	Honda Center	W1	18

December: 3–7–2 (Home: 2–2–1; Road: 1–5–1)

#	Date	Opponent	Score	OT	Win	Loss	Attendance	Record	Arena	Box	Points
25	December 2	Flyers	4–3	OT	Bryzgalov (9–5–2)	Hiller (6–10–5)	15,975	7–13–5	Honda Center	O1	19
26	December 4	Wild	5–3		Harding (7–2–1)	Hiller (6–11–5)	14,002	7–14–5	Honda Center	L1	19
27	December 6	Kings	3–2		Hiller (7–11–5)	Quick (11–7–4)	14,419	8–14–5	Honda Center	W1	21
28	December 8	@ Blues	4–2		Halak (5–7–3)	Hiller (7–12–5)	18,596	8–15–5	Scottrade Center	L1	21
29	December 10	@ Predators	3–2		Rinne (12–9–4)	Ellis (1–4–0)	17,113	8–16–5	Bridgestone Arena	L2	21
30	December 14	Coyotes	4–1		Hiller (8–12–5)	Smith (13–9–3)	13,428	9–16–5	Honda Center	W1	23
31	December 16	@ Blackhawks	4–1		Emery (8–1–2)	Hiller (8–13–5)	21,528	9–17–5	United Center	L1	23
32	December 17	@ Jets	5–3		Mason (4–2–0)	Ellis (1–5–0)	15,004	9–18–5	MTS Centre	L2	23
33	December 19	@ Stars	5–3		Bachman (4–1–0)	Hiller (8–14–5)	13,720	9–19–5	American Airlines Center	L3	23
34	December 22	@ Kings	3–2	SO	Quick (14–10–4)	Hiller (8–14–6)	18,118	9–19–6	Staples Center	O1	24
35	December 26	@ Sharks	3–2		Hiller (9–14–6)	Niemi (15–7–3)	17,562	10–19–6	HP Pavilion	W1	26
36	December 29	Canucks	5–2		Schneider (8–5–0)	Hiller (9–15–6)	17,544	10–20–6	Honda Center	L1	26
37	December 31	Avalanche	4–2		Giguere (9–5–0)	Hiller (9–16–6)	15,119	10–21–6	Honda Center	L2	26

January: 9–2–1 (Home: 6–1–0; Road: 3–1–1)

#	Date	Opponent	Score	OT	Win	Loss	Attendance	Record	Arena	Box	Points
38	January 4	Sharks	3–1		Niemi (17–7–4)	Hiller (9–17–6)	14,596	10–22–6	Honda Center	L3	26
39	January 6	Islanders	4–2		Hiller (10–17–6)	Nabokov (5–9–0)	13,892	11–22–6	Honda Center	W1	28
40	January 8	Blue Jackets	7–4		Tarkki (1–0–0)	Sanford (6–8–3)	13,053	12–22–6	Honda Center	W2	30
41	January 10	Stars	5–2		Deslauriers (1–0–0)	Lehtonen (15–7–1)	12,152	13–22–6	Honda Center	W3	32
42	January 12	@ Flames	1–0	OT	Kiprusoff (20–14–2)	Hiller (10–17–7)	19,289	13–22–7	Scotiabank Saddledome	O1	33
43	January 13	@ Oilers	5–0		Hiller (11–17–7)	Khabibulin (11–13–4)	16,839	14–22–7	Rexall Place	W1	35
44	January 15	@ Canucks	4–2		Hiller (12–17–7)	Luongo (18–10–3)	18,890	15–22–7	Rogers Arena	W2	37
45	January 18	Coyotes	6–2		Hiller (13–17–7)	Smith (17–12–6)	12,281	16–22–7	Honda Center	W3	39
46	January 21	Senators	2–1		Hiller (14–17–7)	Anderson (25–13–4)	15,500	17–22–7	Honda Center	W4	41
47	January 22	Avalanche	3–2		Hiller (15–17–7)	Giguere (12–7–0)	14,004	18–22–7	Honda Center	W5	43
48	January 24	@ Stars	1–0		Lehtonen (17–11–1)	Hiller (15–18–7)	12,141	18–23–7	American Airlines Center	L1	43
Jan. 29: All-Star Game (Chara wins—box)			12–9		Thomas (BOS)	Elliott (STL)	20,510		Scotiabank Place	Ottawa, ON	
49	January 31	@ Coyotes	4–1		Hiller (16–18–7)	Smith (18–14–7)	10,579	19–23–7	Jobing.com Arena	W1	45

February: 8–4–3 (Home: 3–2–1; Road: 5–2–2)

#	Date	Opponent	Score	OT	Win	Loss	Attendance	Record	Arena	Box	Points
50	February 1	Stars	6–2		Lehtonen (18–11–1)	Hiller (16–19–7)	12,701	19–24–7	Honda Center	L1	45
51	February 3	Blue Jackets	3–2	OT	Sanford (9–12–4)	Hiller (16–19–8)	13,358	19–24–8	Honda Center	O1	46
52	February 6	Flames	3–2	SO	Hiller (17–19–8)	Kiprusoff (23–17–4)	12,096	20–24–8	Honda Center	W1	48
53	February 8	Hurricanes	3–2	OT	Hiller (18–19–8)	Ward (20–18–9)	12,675	21–24–8	Honda Center	W2	50
54	February 10	@ Red Wings	2–1	SO	MacDonald (2–1–1)	Hiller (18–19–9)	20,066	21–24–9	Joe Louis Arena	O1	51
55	February 12	@ Blue Jackets	5–3		Hiller (19–19–9)	Mason (6–20–2)	14,033	22–24–9	Nationwide Arena	W1	53
56	February 14	@ Wild	2–1		Hiller (20–19–9)	Harding (9–8–3)	17,552	23–24–9	Xcel Energy Center	W2	55
57	February 15	@ Penguins	2–1		Hiller (21–19–9)	Fleury (29–14–3)	18,482	24–24–9	Consol Energy Center	W3	57
58	February 17	@ Devils	3–2	SO	Brodeur (20–13–2)	Hiller (21–19–10)	15,312	24–24–10	Prudential Center	O1	58
59	February 19	@ Panthers	2–0		Hiller (22–19–10)	Theodore (15–11–5)	15,945	25–24–10	BankAtlantic Center	W1	60
60	February 21	@ Lightning	3–2		Garon (19–15–4)	Hiller (22–20–10)	18,309	25–25–10	Tampa Bay Times Forum	L1	60
61	February 23	@ Hurricanes	3–2	SO	Hiller (23–20–10)	Peters (2–3–1)	16,564	26–25–10	RBC Center	W1	62
62	February 26	Blackhawks	3–1		Hiller (24–20–10)	Emery (11–8–2)	17,601	27–25–10	Honda Center	W2	64
63	February 27	@Avalanche	4–1		Varlamov (18–18–2)	Hiller (24–21–10)	15,133	27–26–10	Pepsi Center	L1	64
64	February 29	Sabres	2–0		Miller (20–17–5)	Hiller (24–22–10)	14,972	27–27–10	Honda Center	L2	64

March: 6–7–1 (Home: 5–3–0; Road: 1–4–1)

#	Date	Opponent	Score	OT	Win	Loss	Attendance	Record	Arena	Box	Points
65	March 2	Flames	3–2		Hiller (25–22–10)	Irving (1–2–3)	16,431	28–27–10	Honda Center	W1	66
66	March 3	@Kings	4–2		Quick (26–18–11)	Hiller (25–23–10)	18,301	28–28–10	Staples Center	L1	66
67	March 5	Oilers	4–2		Hiller (26–23–10)	Khabibulin (12–18–5)	13,596	29–28–10	Honda Center	W1	68
68	March 8	@Blues	3–1		Halak (23–10–5)	Hiller (26–24–10)	19,150	29–29–10	Scottrade Center	L1	68
69	March 10	@Stars	2–0		Lehtonen (28–15–4)	Hiller (26–25–10)	18,228	29–30–10	American Airlines Center	L2	68
70	March 12	@Avalanche	3–2	OT	Varlamov (22–20–2)	Hiller (26–25–11)	15,045	29–30–11	Pepsi Center	O1	69
71	March 14	Red Wings	4–0		Hiller (27–25–11)	MacDonald (8–5–1)	16,331	30–30–11	Honda Center	W1	71
72	March 16	Kings	4–2		Quick (30–19–11)	Hiller (27–26–11)	17,367	30–31–11	Honda Center	L1	71
73	March 18	Predators	3–1		Lindback (3–7–0)	Hiller (27–27–11)	14,978	30–32–11	Honda Center	L2	71
74	March 19	@Sharks	5–3		Deslauriers (2–0–0)	Niemi (28–19–9)	17,562	31–32–11	HP Pavilion	W1	73
75	March 21	Blues	4–3		Hiller (28–27–11)	Halak (25–11–6)	14,494	32–32–11	Honda Center	W2	75
76	March 25	Bruins	3–2		Turco (1–1–0)	Hiller (28–28–11)	17,395	32–33–11	Honda Center	L1	75
77	March 28*	Sharks	3–1		Hiller (29–28–11)	Niemi (31–21–9)	14,780	33–33–11	Honda Center	W1	77
78	March 31	@Coyotes	4–0		Smith (35–18–10)	Deslauriers (2–1–0)	15,856	33–34–11	Jobing.com Arena	L1	77
* Despite the fact that Anaheim defeated San Jose in a 3–1 decision, the Ducks were mathematically eliminated from playoff contention on March 28 due to Dallas and Los Angeles wins earlier in the evening.

April: 1–2–1 (Home: 0–1–0; Road: 1–1–1)

#	Date	Opponent	Score	OT	Win	Loss	Attendance	Record	Arena	Box	Points
79	April 1	Oilers	2–1		Dubnyk (20–18–2)	Hiller (29–29–11)	17,266	33–35–11	Honda Center	L1	77
80	April 3	@Canucks	5–4	SO	Schneider (20–7–1)	Hiller (29–29–12)	18,890	33–35–12	Rogers Arena	O1	78
81	April 5	@Oilers	3–2	OT	Deslauriers (3–1–0)	Dubnyk (20–19–3)	16,839	34–35–12	Rexall Place	W1	80
82	April 7	@Flames	5–2		Karlsson (1–4–2)	Hiller (29–30–12)	19,289	34–36–12	Scotiabank Saddledome	L1	80

Final Games Legend
Ducks Win (2 pts.)	Ducks Loss (0 pts.)	OT Loss (1 pt.)	All-Star Game	Eliminated

Future Games Legend
Home Game	Away Game

"Points" Legend
1st (Pacific Division)	Not in Playoff Position	In Playoff Position

== Standings ==
Pacific Division
Pos	Team	GP	W	L	OTL	ROW	GF	GA	GD	Pts
1	y – Phoenix Coyotes	82	42	27	13	36	216	204	+12	97
2	x – San Jose Sharks	82	43	29	10	34	228	210	+18	96
3	x – Los Angeles Kings	82	40	27	15	34	194	179	+15	95
4	Dallas Stars	82	42	35	5	35	211	222	−11	89
5	Anaheim Ducks	82	34	36	12	31	204	231	−27	80

Source: National Hockey League
x – Clinched playoff spot; y – Clinched division

Western Conference
Pos	Div	Team	GP	W	L	OTL	ROW	GF	GA	GD	Pts
1	NW	p – Vancouver Canucks	82	51	22	9	43	249	198	+51	111
2	CE	y – St. Louis Blues	82	49	22	11	45	210	165	+45	109
3	PA	y – Phoenix Coyotes	82	42	27	13	36	216	204	+12	97
4	CE	x – Nashville Predators	82	48	26	8	43	237	210	+27	104
5	CE	x – Detroit Red Wings	82	48	28	6	39	248	203	+45	102
6	CE	x – Chicago Blackhawks	82	45	26	11	38	248	238	+10	101
7	PA	x – San Jose Sharks	82	43	29	10	34	228	210	+18	96
8	PA	x – Los Angeles Kings	82	40	27	15	34	194	179	+15	95
9	NW	Calgary Flames	82	37	29	16	34	202	226	−24	90
10	PA	Dallas Stars	82	42	35	5	35	211	222	−11	89
11	NW	Colorado Avalanche	82	41	35	6	32	208	220	−12	88
12	NW	Minnesota Wild	82	35	36	11	24	177	226	−49	81
13	PA	Anaheim Ducks	82	34	36	12	31	204	231	−27	80
14	NW	Edmonton Oilers	82	32	40	10	27	212	239	−27	74
15	CE	Columbus Blue Jackets	82	29	46	7	25	202	262	−60	65

Source: National Hockey League
p – Clinched Presidents' Trophy; x – Clinched playoff spot; y – Clinched division

== Player statistics ==
=== Skaters ===
Note: GP = Games played; G = Goals; A = Assists; Pts = Points; +/− = Plus/minus; PIM = Penalty minutes

Regular season

Player	GP	G	A	Pts	+/−	PIM
Teemu Selanne	82	26	40	66	-1	50
Corey Perry	80	37	23	60	−7	127
Ryan Getzlaf	82	11	46	57	−11	75
Bobby Ryan	82	31	26	57	1	53
Saku Koivu	74	11	27	38	7	50
Cam Fowler	82	5	24	29	−28	18
Lubomir Visnovsky	68	6	21	27	7	47
Andrew Cogliano	82	13	13	26	-4	15
Luca Sbisa	80	5	19	24	-5	66
Francois Beauchemin	82	8	14	22	-14	48
Niklas Hagman^{†}	63	8	11	19	−10	12
Nick Bonino	50	5	13	18	1	8
Matt Beleskey	70	4	11	15	-2	72
Sheldon Brookbank	80	3	11	14	11	72
Toni Lydman	74	0	13	13	0	46
Devante Smith-Pelly	49	7	6	13	−7	16
Jason Blake	45	7	5	12	-4	6
Kyle Palmieri	18	4	3	7	3	6
Andrew Gordon^{‡}	37	2	3	5	−10	6
George Parros	46	1	3	4	1	85
Brandon McMillan	25	0	4	4	−10	20
Maxime Macenauer^{‡}	29	1	3	4	−4	18
Rod Pelley^{†}	45	2	1	3	−3	9
Nate Guenin	15	2	0	2	6	6
Kurtis Foster^{‡}	9	1	1	2	-5	8
Peter Holland	4	1	0	1	0	2
Ben Maxwell^{‡}	6	0	1	1	1	2
Mark Bell	5	0	0	0	0	5
Jean-Francois Jacques	6	0	0	0	2	12
Ryan O'Marra^{†}	2	0	0	0	−1	0
Patrick Maroon	2	0	0	0	0	2
Mat Clark	2	0	0	0	-2	0

=== Goaltenders ===
Note: GP = Games played; GS = Games started; TOI = Time on ice (minutes); W = Wins; L = Losses; OT = Overtime losses; GA = Goals against; GAA= Goals against average; SA= Shots against; SV= Saves; Sv% = Save percentage; SO= Shutouts

Regular season

Player	GP	GS	TOI	W	L	OT	GA	GAA	SA	Sv%	SO	G	A	PIM
Jonas Hiller	73	73	4253	29	30	12	182	2.57	2021	.910	4	0	1	0
Dan Ellis	10	5	419	1	5	0	19	2.72	214	.911	0	0	1	0
Jeff Deslauriers	4	4	241	3	1	0	11	2.74	113	.903	0	0	0	0
Iiro Tarkki	1	0	41	1	0	0	3	4.39	10	.700	0	0	0	0

^{†}Denotes player spent time with another team before joining Ducks. Stats reflect time with Ducks only.
^{‡}Traded mid-season.
Bold/italics denotes franchise record

== Awards and records ==
=== Awards ===
Regular Season
Player	Award	Awarded
Jonas Hiller	NHL First Star of the Week	February 20, 2012

=== Milestones ===
Regular Season
Player	Milestone	Reached
Nate Guenin	1st Career NHL Goal	October 7, 2011
Maxime Macenauer	1st Career NHL Game; 1st Career NHL Assist; 1st Career NHL Point	October 7, 2011
Devante Smith-Pelly	1st Career NHL Game	October 7, 2011
Devante Smith-Pelly	1st Career NHL Assist; 1st Career NHL Point	October 8, 2011
Maxime Macenauer	1st Career NHL Goal	October 14, 2011
Sheldon Brookbank	200th Career NHL Game	October 14, 2011
Matt Beleskey	100th Career NHL Game	October 21, 2011
Patrick Maroon	1st Career NHL Game	October 25, 2011
Peter Holland	1st Career NHL Game	November 5, 2011
Devante Smith-Pelly	1st Career NHL Goal	November 9, 2011
Peter Holland	1st Career NHL Goal; 1st Career NHL Point	November 11, 2011
Bobby Ryan	100th Career NHL Assist	November 11, 2011
Ryan Getzlaf	300th Career NHL Assist	November 25, 2011
Cam Fowler	100th Career NHL Game	November 30, 2011
Jonas Hiller	200th Career NHL Game	December 4, 2011
Kyle Palmieri	1st Career NHL Assist	December 16, 2011
Corey Perry	400th Career NHL Point	January 8, 2012
Iiro Tarkki	1st Career NHL Game; 1st Career NHL Win	January 8, 2012
Teemu Selanne	1,300th Career NHL Game	January 12, 2012
Jonas Hiller	100th Career NHL Win	January 15, 2012
Corey Perry	500th Career NHL Game	February 1, 2012
Bobby Ryan	300th Career NHL Game	February 1, 2012
George Parros	400th Career NHL Game	February 12, 2012
Andrew Cogliano	100th Career NHL Assist	February 17, 2012
Toni Lydman	800th Career NHL Game	March 2, 2012
Toni Lydman	200th Career NHL Assist	March 3, 2012
Corey Perry	200th Career NHL Goal	March 5, 2012
Ryan Getzlaf	500th Career NHL Game	March 12, 2012
Saku Koivu	1,000th Career NHL Game	March 12, 2012
Teemu Selanne	1,400th Career NHL Point	March 14, 2012
Andrew Cogliano	400th Career NHL Game	March 16, 2012
Mat Clark	1st Career NHL Game	April 1, 2012
Niklas Hagman	300th Career NHL Point	April 1, 2012

== Transactions ==
The Ducks have been involved in the following transactions during the 2011–12 season.

=== Trades ===
Date	Details
June 24, 2011	To Toronto Maple Leafs 1st-round pick (22nd overall) in 2011	To Anaheim Ducks 1st-round pick (30th overall) in 2011; 2nd-round pick in 2011
June 25, 2011	To Toronto Maple Leafs 6th-round pick in 2012	To Anaheim Ducks 6th-round pick in 2011
July 1, 2011	To Edmonton Oilers Andy Sutton	To Anaheim Ducks Kurtis Foster
July 12, 2011	To Edmonton Oilers 2nd-round pick in 2013	To Anaheim Ducks Andrew Cogliano
July 15, 2011	To Montreal Canadiens Mark Mitera	To Anaheim Ducks Mathieu Carle
October 8, 2011	To Colorado Avalanche Jake Newton; Conditional 7th-round pick in 2013 (Note: Condition satisfied.)	To Anaheim Ducks Kyle Cumiskey
December 12, 2011	To New Jersey Devils Kurtis Foster; Timo Pielmeier	To Anaheim Ducks Mark Fraser; Rod Pelley; 7th-round pick in 2012
January 3, 2012	To Toronto Maple Leafs Nicolas Deschamps	To Anaheim Ducks Luca Caputi
February 13, 2012	To Winnipeg Jets Maxime Macenauer	To Anaheim Ducks Riley Holzapfel
February 16, 2012	To Edmonton Oilers Bryan Rodney	To Anaheim Ducks Ryan O'Marra
February 27, 2012	To Vancouver Canucks Andrew Gordon	To Anaheim Ducks Sebastian Erixon
February 27, 2012	To Toronto Maple Leafs Mark Fraser	To Anaheim Ducks Dale Mitchell

|}

=== Free agents signed ===
Player	Former team	Contract terms
Iiro Tarkki	Espoo Blues	1 year, $900,000 entry-level contract
Andrew Gordon	Washington Capitals	2 years, $1.075 million
Bryan Rodney	Carolina Hurricanes	1 year, $525,000
Jean-Francois Jacques	Edmonton Oilers	1 year, $650,000
Jeff Deslauriers	Edmonton Oilers	2 years, $1.225 million
Matt Smaby	Tampa Bay Lightning	1 year, $600,000
Mark Bell	Kloten Flyers	1 year, $575,000
Troy Bodie	Carolina Hurricanes	1 year, $550,000
John Mitchell	Syracuse Crunch	2 years, $1.06 million entry-level contract
Viktor Fasth	AIK IF	1 year, $1 million
Ryan Lasch	Pelicans	2 years, $1.25 million

=== Free agents lost ===
Player	New team	Contract terms
Andreas Lilja	Philadelphia Flyers	2 years, $1.475 million
Josh Green	Edmonton Oilers	1 year, $575,000
Jason Jaffray	Winnipeg Jets	1 year, $675,000
Kyle Chipchura	Phoenix Coyotes	1 year, $550,000
Ray Emery	Chicago Blackhawks	1 year, $600,000
Brad Winchester	San Jose Sharks	1 year, $725,000

=== Claimed via waivers ===
Player	Former team	Date claimed off waivers
Ben Maxwell	Winnipeg Jets	November 10, 2011
Niklas Hagman	Calgary Flames	November 14, 2011

=== Lost via waivers ===
Player	New team	Date claimed off waivers
Brian McGrattan	Nashville Predators	October 11, 2011
Ben Maxwell	Winnipeg Jets	December 6, 2011

=== Lost via retirement ===
Player
Todd Marchant

=== Players signings ===
Player	Date	Contract terms
Emerson Etem	May 19, 2011	3 years, $2.7 million entry-level contract
Sami Vatanen	May 31, 2011	3 years, $2.355 million entry-level contract
Sean Zimmerman	June 16, 2011	1 year, $525,000
Nate Guenin	June 17, 2011	2 years, $1.05 million
Brian McGrattan	July 7, 2011	1 year, $600,000
Dan Sexton	July 11, 2011	2 years, $1.1 million
Nick Bonino	July 15, 2011	1 year, $693,000
Patrick Maroon	July 16, 2011	1 year, $550,000
Mathieu Carle	July 18, 2011	1 year, $726,000
Andrew Cogliano	July 19, 2011	3 years, $7.17 million
Teemu Selanne	September 15, 2011	1 year, $4 million
Francois Beauchemin	September 15, 2011	3 years, $10.5 million contract extension
John Gibson	March 16, 2012	3 years, $2.2575 million entry-level contract
Chris Wagner	April 3, 2012	3 years, $2.7 million entry-level contract
Saku Koivu	May 9, 2012	1 year, $3 million contract extension
Tim Heed	May 30, 2012	3 years, $1.915 million entry-level contract
Patrick Maroon	June 7, 2012	1 year, $550,000 contract extension

== Draft picks ==
The Ducks' picks at the 2011 NHL entry draft in St. Paul, Minnesota:

Round	#	Player	Position	Nationality	College/Junior/Club team (League)
1	30 (from Boston via Toronto)	Rickard Rakell	RW	Sweden	Plymouth Whalers (OHL)
2	39 (from Toronto)	John Gibson	G	United States	U.S. National Team Development Program (USHL)
2	53	William Karlsson	C	Sweden	VIK Vasteras HK (Allsvenskan)
3	65 (from NY Islanders)	Joseph Cramarossa	C	Canada	Mississauga St. Michael's Majors (OHL)
3	83	Andy Welinski	D	United States	Green Bay Gamblers (USHL)
5	143	Max Friberg	LW	Sweden	Skovde (Swe-3)
6	160 (from Toronto)	Josh Manson	D	Canada	Salmon Arm Silverbacks (BCHL)

== See also ==
- Anaheim Ducks
- Honda Center
- 2011–12 NHL season

=== Other Anaheim–based teams in 2011–12 ===
- Los Angeles Angels of Anaheim (Angel Stadium of Anaheim)
  - 2011 Los Angeles Angels of Anaheim season
  - 2012 Los Angeles Angels of Anaheim season
