= Cody McLeod =

Canadian ice hockey player (born 1984)

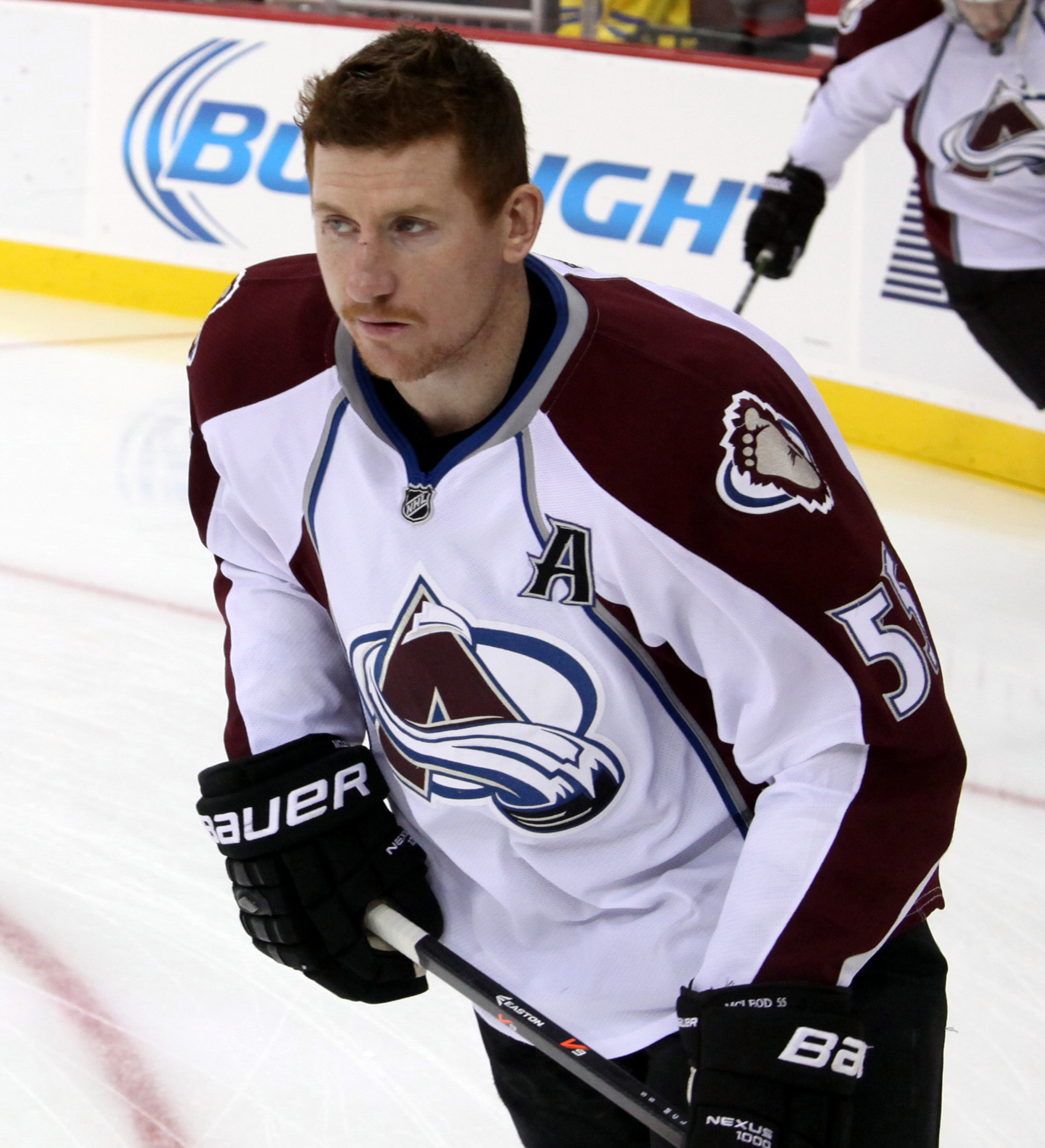
- McLeod with the Colorado Avalanche in 2014
- Born: June 26, 1984 (age 42) Binscarth, Manitoba, Canada
- Height: 6 ft 2 in (188 cm)
- Weight: 210 lb (95 kg; 15 st 0 lb)
- Position: Left wing
- Shot: Left
- Played for: Colorado Avalanche; Nashville Predators; New York Rangers
- NHL draft: Undrafted
- Playing career: 2005–2022

Wesley Cody McLeod (born June 26, 1984) is a Canadian former professional ice hockey winger who is the assistant director of player development coach for the Minnesota Wild of the National Hockey League (NHL). As an undrafted player, McLeod played for the Colorado Avalanche, Nashville Predators, and New York Rangers. He was best known for his role similar to that of an enforcer.

== Playing career ==
McLeod was a fourth-round WHL Bantam Draft pick for the Portland Winterhawks in 1999. In the 2004–05 season, his fourth and final year with the Winterhawks, he scored 31 goals and 60 points.

Undrafted and looking to turn pro, McLeod attended the Boston Bruins training camp in the summer of 2005. McLeod was then reassigned to affiliate, the Providence Bruins training camp on September 17, 2005, before ultimately leaving without a contract. McLeod was signed by the Lowell Lock Monsters of the AHL for the 2005–06. He spent his first full professional season with the Monsters and their ECHL affiliate, the San Diego Gulls.

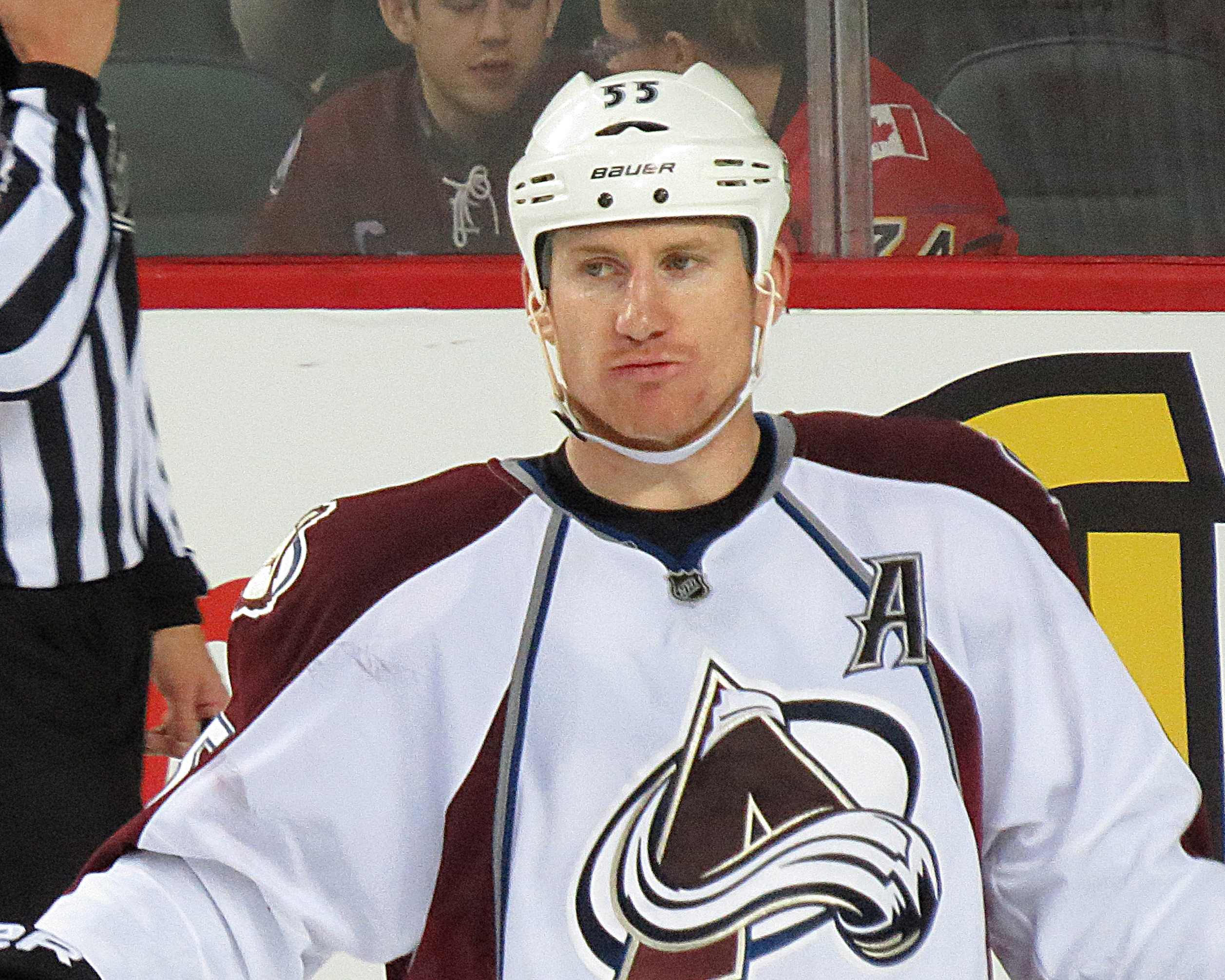
McLeod with the Colorado Avalanche in December 2013

The Colorado Avalanche, as the parent club of the Monsters, signed McLeod to his first NHL contract with the Avalanche on July 6, 2006. After the Avalanche training camp for the 2006–07 season, Mcleod was assigned to new affiliate the Albany River Rats on September 19, 2006.

In the 2007–08 season, McLeod received his first NHL recall on December 16, 2007. He made his NHL debut with the Avalanche on December 19, 2007, in a 2–1 loss against the Anaheim Ducks. A week later, on December 27, he scored his first NHL goal against Dominik Hašek of the Detroit Red Wings in a 4–2 loss. McLeod dressed and played for every remaining Avalanche game after he was called up from the Lake Erie Monsters. McLeod became the first Avalanche rookie in history to record over 100 penalty minutes.

McLeod gained notoriety on April 27, 2008, the second game of the second round of the 2008 Stanley Cup Playoffs against the Detroit Red Wings by picking up the traditional octopus thrown onto the ice in the Joe Louis Arena and throwing it into the stands. McLeod scored his first playoff goal also against the Red Wings in game three on April 29, 2008. With an impressive debut season with Colorado, McLeod was re-signed by the Avalanche to a one-year deal on July 14, 2008.

In the 2008–09 season, McLeod sustained a shoulder injury in a 3–2 home loss against Detroit on March 4, 2009, causing him to miss three straight games. He ended the season third in goals on the Avs with 15, behind only Ryan Smyth and Milan Hejduk. McLeod's 162 penalty minutes were just one minute shy of team-leading Ian Laperrière. McLeod was re-signed by the Avalanche to a 3-year deal on June 19, 2009.

The 2011–12 season saw McLeod set a franchise record becoming the only player in Quebec/Colorado history to register at least 100 PIMs in five consecutive seasons. Behind only Paul Stastny and Milan Hejduk in terms of tenure currently with the club, the Avs signed the pending unrestricted free agent to another three-year contract on June 4, 2012. He was suspended five games in 2013–14 for a hit-from-behind on Detroit Red Wings defenceman Niklas Kronwall in which Kronwall received a concussion.

With Paul Stastny signing with the Blues prior to the 2014–15 season, McLeod became the longest-tenured member of the Avalanche also serving as the club's alternate captain between 2013 and 2016. On September 30, 2014, McLeod agreed to a three-year contract extension to remain with Colorado.

In the 2016–17 season, his 10th with the Avalanche, McLeod saw limited playing time and was reduced to a depth role amongst the forwards. With the Avalanche suffering as the league's worst team through the midpoint of the season, McLeod's tenure with the club ended as he was traded to the Nashville Predators in exchange for Félix Girard on January 13, 2017. He left having played in 659 games, leading the Avalanche franchise with 1359 penalty minutes. McLeod remained in Denver, making his Predators debut the following day against his previous club. He scored his first goal with the Predators and fought against former teammate Jarome Iginla, sparking a 3–2 victory over the Avalanche on January 14, 2017.

In the 2017–18 season, McLeod was used in rotation on the fourth line by the Predators. He posted 1 goal and 1 assist in 23 games before he was placed and later claimed off waivers by the New York Rangers on January 25, 2018. He made his debut with the Rangers against the Toronto Maple Leafs, recording a game and Rangers season-high 8 hits on February 1, 2018. Adding his physicality and veteran presence to the rebuilding Rangers, he played out the season contributing with 2 assists in 25 games.

As a free agent in the off-season, McLeod agreed to remain with the Rangers, securing a one-year, $650,000 contract on July 12, 2018.

During the 2018–19 season, McLeod suffered a fractured hand in a fight against New York Islanders enforcer Ross Johnston on November 21, 2018. After 31 games with the Rangers, on February 6, he was traded back to the Nashville Predators for a 7th-round pick in 2020.

On August 26, 2019, the Minnesota Wild's AHL affiliate Iowa Wild signed McLeod to a standard AHL player contract. Entering his 16th professional year, McLeod appeared in 21 games for Iowa in the 2019–20 season collecting seven points and 41 PIM. Adding a positive veteran presence, McLeod signed a one-year extension with Iowa on July 13, 2020.

Following his third season with the Iowa Wild, captaining the club in the 2021–22 campaign, McLeod announced his retirement to end his 17-year professional career on July 11, 2022. He accepted a role within the Minnesota Wild coaching staff as a player development coach.

== Career statistics ==
=== Regular season and playoffs ===
			Regular season					Playoffs
Season	Team	League	GP	G	A	Pts	PIM	GP	G	A	Pts	PIM
2001–02	Portland Winter Hawks	WHL	47	10	3	13	86	5	0	0	0	0
2002–03	Portland Winter Hawks	WHL	71	15	18	33	153	7	1	1	2	13
2003–04	Waywayseecappo Wolverines	MJHL	1	0	0	0	0	—	—	—	—	—
2003–04	Portland Winter Hawks	WHL	69	13	18	31	227	5	2	2	4	6
2004–05	Portland Winter Hawks	WHL	70	31	29	60	195	7	0	3	3	8
2004–05	Adirondack Frostbite	UHL	1	0	0	0	0	5	0	0	0	11
2005–06	Lowell Lock Monsters	AHL	33	4	5	9	87	—	—	—	—	—
2005–06	San Diego Gulls	ECHL	16	4	5	9	48	2	2	1	3	14
2006–07	Albany River Rats	AHL	73	11	8	19	180	5	0	0	0	4
2007–08	Lake Erie Monsters	AHL	27	6	7	13	101	—	—	—	—	—
2007–08	Colorado Avalanche	NHL	49	4	5	9	120	10	1	1	2	26
2008–09	Colorado Avalanche	NHL	79	15	5	20	162	—	—	—	—	—
2009–10	Colorado Avalanche	NHL	74	7	11	18	138	6	0	0	0	5
2010–11	Colorado Avalanche	NHL	71	5	3	8	189	—	—	—	—	—
2011–12	Colorado Avalanche	NHL	75	6	5	11	164	—	—	—	—	—
2012–13	Colorado Avalanche	NHL	48	8	4	12	83	—	—	—	—	—
2013–14	Colorado Avalanche	NHL	71	5	8	13	122	7	1	0	1	22
2014–15	Colorado Avalanche	NHL	82	7	5	12	191	—	—	—	—	—
2015–16	Colorado Avalanche	NHL	82	8	5	13	138	—	—	—	—	—
2016–17	Colorado Avalanche	NHL	28	1	0	1	52	—	—	—	—	—
2016–17	Nashville Predators	NHL	31	4	1	5	93	15	1	0	1	27
2017–18	Nashville Predators	NHL	23	1	1	2	72	—	—	—	—	—
2017–18	New York Rangers	NHL	25	0	2	2	39	—	—	—	—	—
2018–19	New York Rangers	NHL	31	1	0	1	60	—	—	—	—	—
2018–19	Nashville Predators	NHL	7	0	0	0	7	—	—	—	—	—
2019–20	Iowa Wild	AHL	21	4	3	7	41	—	—	—	—	—
2020–21	Iowa Wild	AHL	30	2	2	4	93	—	—	—	—	—
2021–22	Iowa Wild	AHL	59	4	4	8	141	—	—	—	—	—
NHL totals			776	72	55	127	1,630	38	3	1	4	80
