= Daniel Winnik =

Canadian ice hockey player (born 1985)

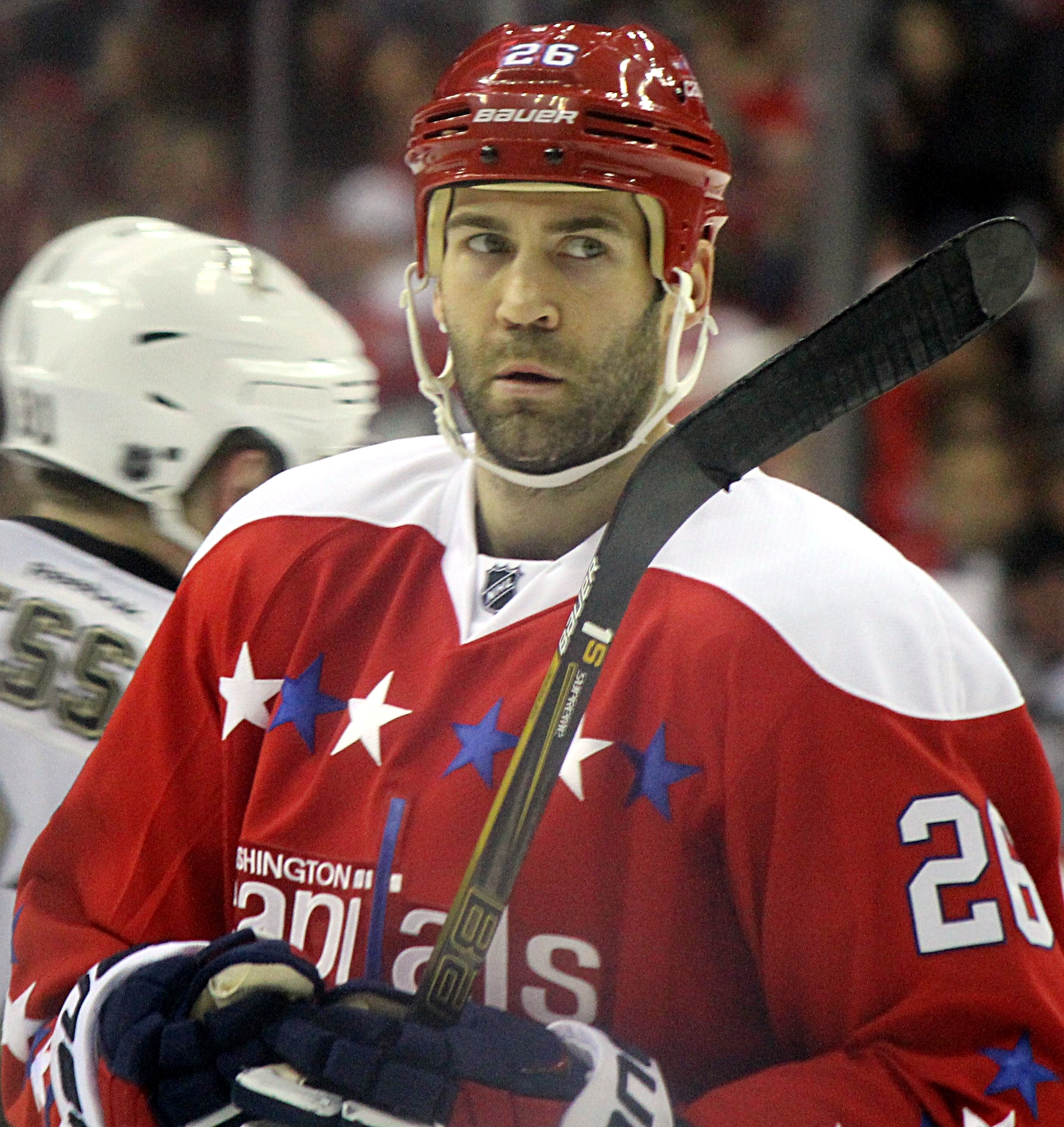
- Winnik with the Washington Capitals in 2016
- Born: March 6, 1985 (age 41) Toronto, Ontario, Canada
- Height: 6 ft 2 in (188 cm)
- Weight: 202 lb (92 kg; 14 st 6 lb)
- Position: Left wing
- Shot: Left
- Played for: Phoenix Coyotes; Colorado Avalanche; San Jose Sharks; Anaheim Ducks; Toronto Maple Leafs; Pittsburgh Penguins; Washington Capitals; Minnesota Wild; Genève-Servette HC
- National team: Canada
- NHL draft: 265th overall, 2004; Phoenix Coyotes
- Playing career: 2006–2024

Daniel Spencer Winnik (born March 6, 1985) is a Canadian former professional ice hockey winger. He played 11 seasons in the National Hockey League (NHL) and played his final six seasons in Switzerland for Genève-Servette HC.

== Playing career ==
After two seasons in the Ontario Provincial Junior A Hockey League (OPJHL) with the Wexford Raiders, Winnik joined the college hockey ranks with the University of New Hampshire of Hockey East. Following his freshman year, Winnik was drafted 265th overall in the 2004 NHL entry draft by the Phoenix Coyotes. He found his scoring touch with the Wildcats in his sophomore year, scoring 18 goals for 40 points and was one of UNH's best in being named to the NCAA Northeast Regional All-Tournament team. In his junior year, Daniel consolidated his break-out year by leading the Wildcats with 26 assists and finishing fifth in the Hockey East in scoring with 41 points. He was named as Hockey East player of the month for November and was selected to the Hockey East Second All-Star Team. After completing a three-year career with New Hampshire he signed a three-year entry-level contract with the Coyotes on March 31, 2006. He immediately made his professional debut with American Hockey League (AHL) affiliate, the San Antonio Rampage, to finish the 2005–06 season.

In his first full professional year in 2006–07, Winnik played in a checking role with the Rampage scoring 21 points in 66 games while also spending a stint in the ECHL with secondary affiliate, the Phoenix RoadRunners. In 2007–08, Winnik made the Coyotes line-up out of training camp and scored his first NHL goal in his debut on October 4, 2007, in a 3–2 win against the St. Louis Blues. At the end of his first NHL year Winnik had established himself as a regular in the Coyotes team and was looked upon, by coach Wayne Gretzky, as the team's top penalty killer.

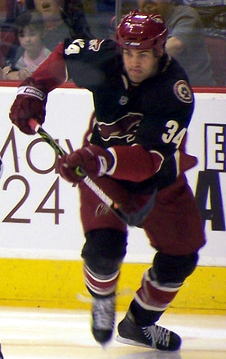
Winnik with the Phoenix Coyotes in 2009.

After a promising start to his NHL career, Dan suffered a sophomore slump in 2008–09, scoring just 7 points in 49 games. Seldom used as a reserve forward, he was assigned to San Antonio on a 5-game conditioning stint on January 1, 2009. He was then re-signed to an arbitrated one-year contract on July 24, 2009. Winnik quickly rebounded in the following 2009–10 season, regaining a checking line role and finding his scoring touch, tying his career high with 15 assists. As part of a resurgent Coyotes team he made his playoff debut appearing scoreless in 7 games against the Detroit Red Wings.

On June 28, 2010, Winnik was traded by the Coyotes to the Colorado Avalanche for a fourth-round pick in the 2012 NHL entry draft. He was then signed to a two-year contract with the Avalanche on July 2, 2010.

In the 2011–12 season, at the trade deadline on February 27, 2012, Winnik was traded by the Avalanche, along with TJ Galiardi and a seventh-round pick, to the San Jose Sharks in exchange for Jamie McGinn and prospects Mike Connolly and Michael Sgarbossa. Unable to agree to terms with the Sharks on a new contract, Winnik was signed as a free agent to a two-year deal with division rivals, the Anaheim Ducks on July 20, 2012.

On July 28, 2014, Winnik signed as a free agent to a one-year contract with his hometown team, the Toronto Maple Leafs, worth $1.3 million. In the 2014–15 season, Winnik proved a versatile asset for the Maple Leafs with his penalty killing abilities and scoring touch, notching 25 points in 58 appearances, and having spent time on all four lines. On February 25, 2015, with the Maple Leafs out of playoff contention, he was traded to the Pittsburgh Penguins in exchange for Zach Sill, a 2015 fourth-round pick and a 2016 second-round pick. In 21 games with the Penguins, Winnik collected 2 goals and 9 points but was unable to help the Penguins to a deep playoff run.

On July 1, 2015, Winnik, by this time a fan favourite in Toronto, returned to the Maple Leafs, signing as a free agent on a two-year deal. Winnik's offensive production declined from his previous season with the Maple Leafs, though he remained a concrete part of the penalty kill. On February 28, 2016, the eve of the trade deadline, Winnik was traded to the Washington Capitals, along with a 5th-round selection (Beck Malenstyn) in the 2016 draft, in exchange for forward Brooks Laich, prospect defenceman Connor Carrick and a 2nd round draft pick in 2016 (Carl Grundström).

After collecting a career-best 12 goals and contributing with 25 points in 72 games for the Presidents' Trophy-winning Capitals in the 2016–17 season, Winnik became a free agent at the conclusion of his contract. Going un-signed over the summer, Winnik accepted an invitation to attend the Minnesota Wild's 2017 training camp on a professional try-out contract (PTO). On the opening day of the 2017–18 season, Winnik secured a one-year deal with the Wild on October 4, 2017.

Prior to the 2018–19 season, Winnik signed a PTO with the Boston Bruins. After attending training camp and remaining on the roster through the pre-season, Winnik was belatedly released from his PTO contract and signed abroad with Genève-Servette HC of the Swiss National League on October 1, 2018. On February 7, 2019, Winnik agreed to an early two-year contract extension worth CHF 1.4 million with Geneva, through the 2020–21 season. On April 6, 2021, Winnik agreed to an early one-year contract extension with Servette through the 2021–22 season. The contract also includes an option for the 2022–23 season. On February 8, 2022, Winnik agreed to an early two-year contract extension with Servette through the 2023–24 season.

On June 27, 2024, Winnik announced his retirement via tweet following 19 professional seasons.

== International play ==
In January 2022, Winnik was selected to play for Team Canada at the 2022 Winter Olympics.

== Career statistics ==
=== Regular season and playoffs ===
			Regular season					Playoffs
Season	Team	League	GP	G	A	Pts	PIM	GP	G	A	Pts	PIM
2001–02	Wexford Raiders	OPJHL	47	18	25	43	32	—	—	—	—	—
2002–03	Wexford Raiders	OPJHL	47	20	33	53	70	18	11	11	22	24
2003–04	University of New Hampshire	HE	37	4	10	14	12	—	—	—	—	—
2004–05	University of New Hampshire	HE	42	18	22	40	26	—	—	—	—	—
2005–06	University of New Hampshire	HE	39	15	26	41	44	—	—	—	—	—
2005–06	San Antonio Rampage	AHL	7	1	1	2	8	—	—	—	—	—
2006–07	San Antonio Rampage	AHL	66	9	12	21	34	—	—	—	—	—
2006–07	Phoenix RoadRunners	ECHL	5	0	6	6	9	—	—	—	—	—
2007–08	Phoenix Coyotes	NHL	79	11	15	26	25	—	—	—	—	—
2008–09	Phoenix Coyotes	NHL	79	3	4	7	63	—	—	—	—	—
2008–09	San Antonio Rampage	AHL	5	0	0	0	4	—	—	—	—	—
2009–10	Phoenix Coyotes	NHL	74	4	15	19	12	7	0	0	0	0
2010–11	Colorado Avalanche	NHL	80	11	15	26	35	—	—	—	—	—
2011–12	Colorado Avalanche	NHL	63	5	13	18	42	—	—	—	—	—
2011–12	San Jose Sharks	NHL	21	3	2	5	10	5	0	1	1	6
2012–13	Anaheim Ducks	NHL	48	6	13	19	16	7	0	1	1	7
2013–14	Anaheim Ducks	NHL	76	6	24	30	23	9	0	1	1	2
2014–15	Toronto Maple Leafs	NHL	58	7	18	25	19	—	—	—	—	—
2014–15	Pittsburgh Penguins	NHL	21	2	7	9	8	5	0	0	0	2
2015–16	Toronto Maple Leafs	NHL	56	4	10	14	16	—	—	—	—	—
2015–16	Washington Capitals	NHL	20	2	3	5	22	12	0	0	0	4
2016–17	Washington Capitals	NHL	72	12	13	25	49	13	0	0	0	0
2017–18	Minnesota Wild	NHL	81	6	17	23	27	5	0	1	1	5
2018–19	Genève–Servette HC	NL	41	6	25	31	42	5	1	2	3	4
2019–20	Genève–Servette HC	NL	49	22	22	44	48	—	—	—	—	—
2020–21	Genève–Servette HC	NL	49	15	31	46	46	11	4	5	9	8
2021–22	Genève–Servette HC	NL	48	25	29	54	86	2	0	1	1	0
2022–23	Genève–Servette HC	NL	47	18	28	46	32	18	4	6	10	18
2023–24	Genève–Servette HC	NL	36	5	8	13	36	2	0	2	2	4
NHL totals			798	82	169	251	367	63	0	4	4	26
NL totals			270	91	143	234	290	38	9	16	25	34

=== International ===
Year	Team	Event	Result	GP	G	A	Pts	PIM
2022	Canada	OG	6th	5	1	1	2	6
Senior totals				5	1	1	2	6

== Awards and honours ==
Award	Year
College
Hockey East All-Tournament Team	2005
All-Hockey East Second team	2005–06
