= 2012–13 Colorado Avalanche season =

National Hockey League team season

2012–13 Colorado Avalanche
- Division: 5th Northwest
- Conference: 15th Western
- 2012–13 record: 16–25–7
- Home record: 12–9–3
- Road record: 4–16–4
- Goals for: 116
- Goals against: 152

Team information
- General manager: Greg Sherman
- Coach: Joe Sacco
- Captain: Gabriel Landeskog
- Alternate captains: Milan Hejduk; Paul Stastny
- Arena: Pepsi Center
- Average attendance: 15,257 (84.7%) (12 games)

Team leaders
- Goals: P. A. Parenteau (18)
- Assists: Matt Duchene (26)
- Points: Matt Duchene; P. A. Parenteau (43)
- Penalty minutes: Cody McLeod (83)
- Plus/minus: Chuck Kobasew (+6)
- Wins: Semyon Varlamov (11)
- Goals against average: Jean-Sebastien Giguere (2.84)

The 2012–13 Colorado Avalanche season was the 41st overall season for the franchise, 34th season in the National Hockey League (NHL), since June 22, 1979, and 18th season since the franchise relocated to Colorado to start the 1995–96 NHL season. The regular season was reduced from its usual 82 games to 48 due to the 2012–13 NHL lockout.

== Off-season ==
On September 4, 2012, the Avalanche named Gabriel Landeskog as the fourth team captain in Avalanche history, after Milan Hejduk resigned from the role. Landeskog became the youngest captain in NHL history, being 11 days younger than Sidney Crosby was when Crosby was named captain of the Pittsburgh Penguins in 2007.

== Regular season ==
The Avalanche finished the season with the worst record in the Western Conference and second-worst record in the league. As a result, head coach Joe Sacco was fired the day after Colorado's regular season ended. Former Avalanche goaltender Patrick Roy was hired as the new head coach on May 23, 2013.

== Standings ==
Northwest Division
Pos	Team	GP	W	L	OTL	ROW	GF	GA	GD	Pts
1	y – Vancouver Canucks	48	26	15	7	21	127	121	+6	59
2	x – Minnesota Wild	48	26	19	3	22	122	127	−5	55
3	Edmonton Oilers	48	19	22	7	17	125	134	−9	45
4	Calgary Flames	48	19	25	4	19	128	160	−32	42
5	Colorado Avalanche	48	16	25	7	14	116	152	−36	39

Source: National Hockey League
x – Clinched playoff spot; y – Clinched division

Western Conference
Pos	Div	Team	GP	W	L	OTL	ROW	GF	GA	GD	Pts
1	CE	p – Chicago Blackhawks	48	36	7	5	30	155	102	+53	77
2	PA	y – Anaheim Ducks	48	30	12	6	24	140	118	+22	66
3	NW	y – Vancouver Canucks	48	26	15	7	21	127	121	+6	59
4	CE	x – St. Louis Blues	48	29	17	2	24	129	115	+14	60
5	PA	x – Los Angeles Kings	48	27	16	5	25	133	118	+15	59
6	PA	x – San Jose Sharks	48	25	16	7	17	124	116	+8	57
7	CE	x – Detroit Red Wings	48	24	16	8	22	124	115	+9	56
8	NW	x – Minnesota Wild	48	26	19	3	22	122	127	−5	55
9	CE	Columbus Blue Jackets	48	24	17	7	19	120	119	+1	55
10	PA	Phoenix Coyotes	48	21	18	9	17	125	131	−6	51
11	PA	Dallas Stars	48	22	22	4	20	130	142	−12	48
12	NW	Edmonton Oilers	48	19	22	7	17	125	134	−9	45
13	NW	Calgary Flames	48	19	25	4	19	128	160	−32	42
14	CE	Nashville Predators	48	16	23	9	14	111	139	−28	41
15	NW	Colorado Avalanche	48	16	25	7	14	116	152	−36	39

Source: National Hockey League
p – Clinched Presidents' Trophy; x – Clinched playoff spot; y – Clinched division

== Schedule and results ==
=== Regular season ===
Win (2 points) Loss (0 points) Overtime/shootout loss (1 point)

2012–13 Game log
January: 3–4–0 (Home: 2–0–0; Road: 1–4–0)

#	Date	Visitor	Score	Home	OT	Decision	Record	Pts	Recap
1	January 19	Colorado Avalanche	2–4	Minnesota Wild		Varlamov	0–1–0	0	Recap
2	January 22	Los Angeles Kings	1–3	Colorado Avalanche		Varlamov	1–1–0	2	Recap
3	January 24	Columbus Blue Jackets	0–4	Colorado Avalanche		Varlamov	2–1–0	4	Recap
4	January 26	Colorado Avalanche	0–4	San Jose Sharks		Varlamov	2–2–0	4	Recap
5	January 28	Colorado Avalanche	1–4	Edmonton Oilers		Varlamov	2–3–0	4	Recap
6	January 30	Colorado Avalanche	0–3	Vancouver Canucks		Varlamov	2–4–0	4	Recap
7	January 31	Colorado Avalanche	6–3	Calgary Flames		Giguere	3–4–0	6	Recap

February: 5–4–3 (Home: 4–2–1; Road: 1–2–2)

#	Date	Visitor	Score	Home	OT	Decision	Record	Pts	Recap
8	February 2	Edmonton Oilers	1–3	Colorado Avalanche		Varlamov	4–4–0	8	Recap
9	February 4	Dallas Stars	3–2	Colorado Avalanche		Varlamov	4–5–0	8	Recap
10	February 6	Anaheim Ducks	3–0	Colorado Avalanche		Varlamov	4–6–0	8	Recap
11	February 11	Phoenix Coyotes	3–2	Colorado Avalanche	OT	Varlamov	4–6–1	9	Recap
12	February 14	Colorado Avalanche	4–3	Minnesota Wild	SO	Giguere	5–6–1	11	Recap
13	February 16	Colorado Avalanche	4–6	Edmonton Oilers		Varlamov	5–7–1	11	Recap
14	February 18	Nashville Predators	5–6	Colorado Avalanche		Varlamov	6–7–1	13	Recap
15	February 20	St. Louis Blues	0–1	Colorado Avalanche	OT	Varlamov	7–7–1	15	Recap
16	February 23	Colorado Avalanche	1–4	Los Angeles Kings		Varlamov	7–8–1	15	Recap
17	February 24	Colorado Avalanche	3–4	Anaheim Ducks	OT	Giguere	7–8–2	16	Recap
18	February 26	Colorado Avalanche	2–3	San Jose Sharks	SO	Varlamov	7–8–3	17	Recap
19	February 28	Calgary Flames	4–5	Colorado Avalanche		Varlamov	8–8–3	19	Recap

March: 4–10–1 (Home: 4–4–0; Road: 0–6–1)

#	Date	Visitor	Score	Home	OT	Decision	Record	Pts	Recap
20	March 3	Colorado Avalanche	1–2	Columbus Blue Jackets	OT	Varlamov	8–8–4	20	Recap
21	March 5	Colorado Avalanche	1–2	Detroit Red Wings		Giguere	8–9–4	20	Recap
22	March 6	Colorado Avalanche	2–3	Chicago Blackhawks		Varlamov	8–10–4	20	Recap
23	March 8	Chicago Blackhawks	2–6	Colorado Avalanche		Varlamov	9–10–4	22	Recap
24	March 10	San Jose Sharks	2–3	Colorado Avalanche	OT	Varlamov	10–10–4	24	Recap
25	March 12	Edmonton Oilers	4–0	Colorado Avalanche		Varlamov	10–11–4	24	Recap
26	March 14	Colorado Avalanche	3–5	Minnesota Wild		Varlamov	10–12–4	24	Recap
27	March 16	Minnesota Wild	6–4	Colorado Avalanche		Varlamov	10–13–4	24	Recap
28	March 18	Chicago Blackhawks	5–2	Colorado Avalanche		Varlamov	10–14–4	24	Recap
29	March 20	Dallas Stars	3–4	Colorado Avalanche		Varlamov	11–14–4	26	Recap
30	March 23	Colorado Avalanche	2–5	Dallas Stars		Varlamov	11–15–4	26	Recap
31	March 24	Vancouver Canucks	3–2	Colorado Avalanche		Giguere	11–16–4	26	Recap
32	March 27	Colorado Avalanche	3–4	Calgary Flames		Varlamov	11–17–4	26	Recap
33	March 28	Colorado Avalanche	1–4	Vancouver Canucks		Varlamov	11–18–4	26	Recap
34	March 30	Nashville Predators	0–1	Colorado Avalanche	OT	Varlamov	12–18–4	28	Recap

April: 4–8–2 (Home: 2–3–2; Road: 2–5–0)

#	Date	Visitor	Score	Home	OT	Decision	Record	Pts	Recap
35	April 1	Colorado Avalanche	2–3	Detroit Red Wings		Varlamov	12–19–4	28	Recap
36	April 2	Colorado Avalanche	1–3	Nashville Predators		Giguere	12–20–4	28	Recap
37	April 5	Detroit Red Wings	3–2	Colorado Avalanche	OT	Giguere	12–20–5	29	Recap
38	April 6	Colorado Avalanche	0–4	Phoenix Coyotes		Varlamov	12–21–5	29	Recap
39	April 8	Calgary Flames	3–1	Colorado Avalanche		Giguere	12–22–5	29	Recap
40	April 10	Colorado Avalanche	4–1	Anaheim Ducks		Giguere	13–22–5	31	Recap
41	April 11	Colorado Avalanche	2–3	Los Angeles Kings	SO	Giguere	13–22–6	32	Recap
42	April 13	Vancouver Canucks	3–4	Colorado Avalanche		Giguere	14–22–6	34	Recap
43	April 15	Columbus Blue Jackets	4–3	Colorado Avalanche	OT	Giguere	14–22–7	35	Recap
44	April 19	Edmonton Oilers	4–1	Colorado Avalanche		Varlamov	14–23–7	35	Recap
45	April 21	St. Louis Blues	3–5	Colorado Avalanche		Giguere	15–23–7	37	Recap
46	April 23	Colorado Avalanche	1–3	St. Louis Blues		Varlamov	15–24–7	37	Recap
47	April 26	Colorado Avalanche	5–4	Phoenix Coyotes	SO	Varlamov	16–24–7	39	Recap
48	April 27	Minnesota Wild	3–1	Colorado Avalanche		Varlamov	16–25–7	39	Recap

== Playoffs ==
The Colorado Avalanche failed to qualify for the 2013 Stanley Cup playoffs.

== Player statistics ==
Final stats

Skaters

Regular season
Player	GP	G	A	Pts	+/-	PIM
P. A. Parenteau	48	18	25	43	−11	38
Matt Duchene	47	17	26	43	−12	12
Paul Stastny	40	9	15	24	−7	14
Jamie McGinn	47	11	11	22	−13	26
John Mitchell	47	10	10	20	5	18
Ryan O'Reilly	29	6	14	20	−3	4
Gabriel Landeskog	36	9	8	17	−4	22
Tyson Barrie	32	2	11	13	−11	10
Cody McLeod	48	8	4	12	4	83
Milan Hejduk	29	4	7	11	−7	0
Jan Hejda	46	1	9	10	−3	28
Chuck Kobasew	37	5	4	9	6	21
David Jones	33	3	6	9	−11	6
Aaron Palushaj	25	2	7	9	−2	8
Greg Zanon	44	0	6	6	−16	28
Matt Hunwick	43	0	6	6	4	16
Mark Olver	32	4	2	6	−5	6
Patrick Bordeleau	46	2	3	5	−7	70
Shane O'Brien	28	0	4	4	0	60
Erik Johnson	31	0	4	4	−3	18
Stefan Elliott	18	1	3	4	−3	2
Ryan O'Byrne^{‡}	34	1	3	4	−8	54
Ryan Wilson	12	0	3	3	4	8
David Van der Gulik	9	0	2	2	2	6
Brad Malone	13	1	1	2	−7	16
Steve Downie	2	0	1	1	1	6
Tomas Vincour	2	0	1	1	−1	2
Michael Sgarbossa	6	0	0	0	−3	4
Totals	8	19	31	50	35	149

Goaltenders

Regular season
Player	GP	GS	TOI	W	L	OT	GA	GAA	SA	SV%	SO	G	A	PIM
Semyon Varlamov	35	33	1949:39	11	21	3	98	3.02	1007	.903	3	0	1	0
Jean-Sebastien Giguere	18	14	907:50	5	4	4	43	2.84	469	.908	0	0	0	2
Sami Aittokallio	1	1	49:20	0	0	0	2	2.45	25	.920	0	0	0	0
Totals		48	2906:49	16	25	7	143	2.95	1501	.905	3	0	1	0

^{†}Denotes player spent time with another team before joining the Avalanche. Stats reflect time with the Avalanche only.
^{‡}Traded mid-season
Bold/italics denotes franchise record

== Transactions ==
The Avalanche have been involved in the following transactions during the 2012–13 season.

=== Trades ===
Date	Details
April 2, 2013	To Dallas Stars Cameron Gaunce	To Colorado Avalanche Tomas Vincour
April 3, 2013	To Toronto Maple Leafs Ryan O'Byrne	To Colorado Avalanche 4th-round pick in 2014

=== Free agents acquired ===
Player	Former team	Contract terms
John Mitchell	New York Rangers	2 years, $2.2 million
P. A. Parenteau	New York Islanders	4 years, $16 million
Greg Zanon	Boston Bruins	2 years, $4.5 million
Bryan Lerg	Wilkes-Barre/Scranton Penguins	1 year, $525,000
Thomas Pock	Modo Hockey	1 year, $550,000
Sean Sullivan	San Antonio Rampage	1 year, $575,000
Bill Thomas	Florida Panthers	1 year, $550,000
Geoff Walker	Wilkes-Barre/Scranton Penguins	1 year, $550,000

=== Free agents lost ===
Player	New team	Contract terms
Jay McClement	Toronto Maple Leafs	2 years, $3 million
Kevin Porter	Buffalo Sabres	2 years, $1.075 million
Peter Mueller	Florida Panthers	1 year, $1.725 million

=== Claimed via waivers ===
Player	Former team	Date claimed off waivers
Aaron Palushaj	Montreal Canadiens	February 5, 2013

=== Lost via waivers ===
Player	New team	Date claimed off waivers

=== Lost via retirement ===
Player

=== Player signings ===
Player	Date	Contract terms
Matt Duchene	June 23, 2012	2 years, $7 million
Ryan Wilson	June 25, 2012	3 years, $6.75 million
Patrick Bordeleau	June 25, 2012	1 year, $525,000
David Van der Gulik	June 25, 2012	1 year, $575,000
Shane O'Brien	June 26, 2012	3 years, $6 million
Steve Downie	June 29, 2012	2 years, $5.3 million
Erik Johnson	July 3, 2012	4 years, $15 million
Jamie McGinn	July 13, 2012	2 years, $3.5 million
Mark Olver	July 13, 2012	2 years, $1.2 million
Jean-Sebastien Giguere	August 13, 2012	1 year, $1.5 million contract extension
Mitchell Heard	August 14, 2012	3 years, entry-level contract
Ryan O'Reilly	February 28, 2013	2 years, $10 million (offer sheet matched)
Patrick Bordeleau	June 5, 2013	3 years, $3 million contract extension

== Draft picks ==
Colorado's picks at the 2012 NHL entry draft in Pittsburgh, Pennsylvania.

Round	#	Player	Pos	Nationality	College/junior/club team (league)
2	41	Mitchell Heard	C	Canada	Plymouth Whalers (OHL)
3	72	Troy Bourke	LW	Canada	Prince George Cougars (WHL)
5	132	Michael Clarke	C	Canada	Windsor Spitfires (OHL)
6	162	Joseph Blandisi	C/RW	Canada	Owen Sound Attack (OHL)
7	192	Colin Smith	C	Canada	Kamloops Blazers (WHL)

Draft notes

- The Avalanche's first-round pick (#11) and second-round pick (#54) went to the Washington Capitals as the result of a July 1, 2011, trade that sent the rights for Semyon Varlamov to the Avalanche in exchange for these picks.
- The Avalanche's fourth-round pick went to the Phoenix Coyotes as the result of a June 28, 2010, trade that sent Daniel Winnik to the Avalanche in exchange for this pick.

== See also ==
- 2012–13 NHL season
