= 2012–13 Dallas Stars season =

National Hockey League team season

2012–13 Dallas Stars
- Division: 5th Pacific
- Conference: 11th Western
- 2012–13 record: 22–22–4
- Home record: 11–11–2
- Road record: 11–11–2
- Goals for: 130
- Goals against: 142

Team information
- General manager: Joe Nieuwendyk
- Coach: Glen Gulutzan
- Captain: Brenden Morrow (Oct.–Mar.); Vacant (Mar.–Apr.)
- Alternate captains: Jamie Benn (Mar.–Apr.); Loui Eriksson; Stephane Robidas; Ray Whitney
- Arena: American Airlines Center
- Average attendance: 17,063 (92.1%) (24 games)

Team leaders
- Goals: Jamie Benn (12)
- Assists: Alex Goligoski (24)
- Points: Jamie Benn (33)
- Penalty minutes: Antoine Roussel (85)
- Plus/minus: Alex Goligoski (+4)
- Wins: Kari Lehtonen (15)
- Goals against average: Kari Lehtonen (2.66)

The 2012–13 Dallas Stars season was the 46th season for the National Hockey League (NHL) franchise that was established on June 5, 1967, and 20th season since the franchise relocated to Dallas to start the 1993–94 season. The regular season was reduced from its usual 82 games to 48 due to the 2012–13 NHL lockout.

During the off-season, the Stars acquired veteran and Pittsburgh Penguins legend Jaromir Jagr after returning to the NHL and playing last season for the Philadelphia Flyers. Due to the lockout, Jagr played only four months as a Star and would be traded to the Boston Bruins, where he would appear in his first Stanley Cup Final trip since 1992.

The Stars failed to qualify for the Stanley Cup playoffs for the fifth-straight season.

== Regular season ==
=== Standings ===
Pacific Division
Pos	Team	GP	W	L	OTL	ROW	GF	GA	GD	Pts
1	y – Anaheim Ducks	48	30	12	6	24	140	118	+22	66
2	x – Los Angeles Kings	48	27	16	5	25	133	118	+15	59
3	x – San Jose Sharks	48	25	16	7	17	124	116	+8	57
4	Phoenix Coyotes	48	21	18	9	17	125	131	−6	51
5	Dallas Stars	48	22	22	4	20	130	142	−12	48

Source: National Hockey League
x – Clinched playoff spot; y – Clinched division

Western Conference
Pos	Div	Team	GP	W	L	OTL	ROW	GF	GA	GD	Pts
1	CE	p – Chicago Blackhawks	48	36	7	5	30	155	102	+53	77
2	PA	y – Anaheim Ducks	48	30	12	6	24	140	118	+22	66
3	NW	y – Vancouver Canucks	48	26	15	7	21	127	121	+6	59
4	CE	x – St. Louis Blues	48	29	17	2	24	129	115	+14	60
5	PA	x – Los Angeles Kings	48	27	16	5	25	133	118	+15	59
6	PA	x – San Jose Sharks	48	25	16	7	17	124	116	+8	57
7	CE	x – Detroit Red Wings	48	24	16	8	22	124	115	+9	56
8	NW	x – Minnesota Wild	48	26	19	3	22	122	127	−5	55
9	CE	Columbus Blue Jackets	48	24	17	7	19	120	119	+1	55
10	PA	Phoenix Coyotes	48	21	18	9	17	125	131	−6	51
11	PA	Dallas Stars	48	22	22	4	20	130	142	−12	48
12	NW	Edmonton Oilers	48	19	22	7	17	125	134	−9	45
13	NW	Calgary Flames	48	19	25	4	19	128	160	−32	42
14	CE	Nashville Predators	48	16	23	9	14	111	139	−28	41
15	NW	Colorado Avalanche	48	16	25	7	14	116	152	−36	39

Source: National Hockey League
p – Clinched Presidents' Trophy; x – Clinched playoff spot; y – Clinched division

=== Schedule and results ===
2012–13 Game Log

January: 2–4–1 (Home: 1–1–1; Road: 1–3–0)
#	Date	Visitor	Score	Home	OT	Decision	Attendance	Record	Pts	Recap
1	January 19	Phoenix Coyotes	3–4	Dallas Stars	—		18,532	1–0–0	2	Recap
2	January 20	Dallas Stars	0–1	Minnesota Wild	—		18,296	1–1–0	2	Recap
3	January 22	Dallas Stars	2–1	Detroit Red Wings	—		20,066	2–1–0	4	Recap
4	January 24	Chicago Blackhawks	3–2	Dallas Stars	OT		17,868	2–1–1	5	Recap
5	January 26	St. Louis Blues	4–3	Dallas Stars	—		17,131	2–2–1	5	Recap
6	January 28	Dallas Stars	1–2	Columbus Blue Jackets	—		10,475	2–3–1	5	Recap
7	January 29	Dallas Stars	1–4	Detroit Red Wings	—		20,066	2–4–1	5	Recap

February: 8–6–2 (Home: 3–3–0; Road: 5–3–1)
#	Date	Visitor	Score	Home	OT	Decision	Attendance	Record	Pts	Recap
8	February 1	Phoenix Coyotes	3–4	Dallas Stars	SO		18,101	3–4–1	7	Recap
9	February 2	Dallas Stars	0–2	Phoenix Coyotes	—		12,151	3–5–1	7	Recap
10	February 4	Dallas Stars	3–2	Colorado Avalanche	—		13,441	4–5–1	9	Recap
11	February 6	Dallas Stars	3–2	Edmonton Oilers	OT		16,839	5–5–1	11	Recap
12	February 8	Anaheim Ducks	1–3	Dallas Stars	—		18,112	6–5–1	13	Recap
13	February 12	Dallas Stars	4–1	Edmonton Oilers	—		16,839	7–5–1	15	Recap
14	February 13	Dallas Stars	4–7	Calgary Flames	—		19,289	7–6–1	15	Recap
15	February 15	Dallas Stars	4–3	Vancouver Canucks	—		18,910	8–6–1	17	Recap
16	February 17	Calgary Flames	4–3	Dallas Stars	—		17,340	8–7–1	17	Recap
17	February 21	Vancouver Canucks	4–3	Dallas Stars	—		17,393	8–8–1	17	Recap
18	February 23	San Jose Sharks	1–3	Dallas Stars	—		18,584	9–8–1	19	Recap
19	February 25	Dallas Stars	4–5	Nashville Predators	OT		17,113	9–8–2	20	Recap
20	February 26	Dallas Stars	5–4	Columbus Blue Jackets	OT		11,523	10–8–2	22	Recap
21	February 28	Edmonton Oilers	5–1	Dallas Stars	—		17,004	10–9–2	22	Recap

March: 6–6–1 (Home: 4–4–1; Road: 2–2–0)
#	Date	Visitor	Score	Home	OT	Decision	Attendance	Record	Pts	Recap
22	March 3	St. Louis Blues	1–4	Dallas Stars	—		16,663	11–9–2	24	Recap
23	March 7	Dallas Stars	5–2	Los Angeles Kings	—		18,118	12–9–2	26	Recap
24	March 9	Dallas Stars	1–2	Phoenix Coyotes	—		15,842	12–10–2	26	Recap
25	March 12	Nashville Predators	4–0	Dallas Stars	—		15,661	12–11–2	26	Recap
26	March 14	Anaheim Ducks	2–1	Dallas Stars	SO		15,775	12–11–3	27	Recap
27	March 16	Chicago Blackhawks	8–1	Dallas Stars	—		18,584	12–12–3	27	Recap
28	March 18	Calgary Flames	3–4	Dallas Stars	—		16,057	13–12–3	29	Recap
29	March 20	Dallas Stars	3–4	Colorado Avalanche	—		13,813	13–13–3	29	Recap
30	March 21	Dallas Stars	2–0	Los Angeles Kings	—		18,118	14–13–3	31	Recap
31	March 23	Colorado Avalanche	2–5	Dallas Stars	—		17,311	15–13–3	33	Recap
32	March 25	Minnesota Wild	7–4	Dallas Stars	—		16,167	15–14–3	33	Recap
33	March 29	Minnesota Wild	3–5	Dallas Stars	—		17,376	16–14–3	35	Recap
34	March 31	Los Angeles Kings	3–2	Dallas Stars	—		15,719	16–15–3	35	Recap

April: 6–7–1 (Home: 3–3–0; Road: 3–4–1)
#	Date	Visitor	Score	Home	OT	Decision	Attendance	Record	Pts	Recap
35	April 1	Anaheim Ducks	4–0	Dallas Stars	—		13,748	16–16–3	35	Recap
36	April 3	Dallas Stars	2–5	Anaheim Ducks	—		15,165	16–17–3	35	Recap
37	April 5	Dallas Stars	3–1	Anaheim Ducks	—		16,884	17–17–3	37	Recap
38	April 7	Dallas Stars	5–4	San Jose Sharks	SO		17,562	18–17–3	39	Recap
39	April 9	Los Angeles Kings	1–5	Dallas Stars	—		16,367	19–17–3	41	Recap
40	April 12	Dallas Stars	5–2	Nashville Predators	—		16,818	20–17–3	43	Recap
41	April 13	San Jose Sharks	1–2	Dallas Stars	—		18,007	21–17–3	45	Recap
42	April 15	Dallas Stars	2–5	Chicago Blackhawks	—		21,986	21–18–3	45	Recap
43	April 18	Vancouver Canucks	1–5	Dallas Stars	—		16,571	22–18–3	47	Recap
44	April 19	Dallas Stars	1–2	St. Louis Blues	—		19,328	22–19–3	47	Recap
45	April 21	Dallas Stars	3–4	Los Angeles Kings	OT		18,118	22–19–4	48	Recap
46	April 23	Dallas Stars	2–3	San Jose Sharks	—		17,562	22–20–4	48	Recap
47	April 25	Columbus Blue Jackets	3–1	Dallas Stars	—		16,918	22–21–4	48	Recap
48	April 27	Detroit Red Wings	3–0	Dallas Stars	—		18,532	22–22–4	48	Recap

Legend: = Win = Loss = OT/SO Loss

== Player statistics ==
Final

Skaters

Regular season
Player	GP	G	A	Pts	+/-	PIM
Jamie Benn	41	12	21	33	−12	40
Ray Whitney	32	11	18	29	1	4
Loui Eriksson	48	12	17	29	−9	8
Alex Goligoski	47	3	24	27	4	18
Jaromir Jagr^{‡}	34	14	12	26	−5	20
Cody Eakin	48	7	17	24	1	31
Derek Roy^{‡}	30	4	18	22	3	4
Vernon Fiddler	46	4	13	17	3	48
Antoine Roussel	39	7	7	14	3	85
Michael Ryder^{‡}	19	6	8	14	4	8
Stephane Robidas	48	1	12	13	2	56
Trevor Daley	44	4	9	13	1	14
Eric Nystrom	48	7	4	11	−3	61
Brenden Morrow^{‡}	29	6	5	11	−8	18
Ryan Garbutt	36	3	7	10	1	32
Reilly Smith	37	3	6	9	0	8
Brenden Dillon	48	3	5	8	1	65
Erik Cole^{†}	28	6	1	7	−7	10
Alex Chiasson	7	6	1	7	3	0
Jordie Benn	26	1	5	6	−4	10
Aaron Rome	27	0	5	5	−2	18
Philip Larsen	32	2	3	5	−10	18
Matt Fraser	12	1	2	3	0	0
Tomas Vincour^{‡}	15	2	1	3	0	2
Lane MacDermid	6	2	0	2	1	9
Jamie Oleksiak	16	0	2	2	−5	14
Tom Wandell	18	1	0	1	0	4
Colton Sceviour	1	0	1	1	−1	0
Toby Petersen	1	0	0	0	0	0
Francis Wathier	1	0	0	0	0	0
Total		128	224	352	−38	605

Goaltenders

Regular season
Player	GP	GS	TOI	W	L	OT	GA	GAA	SA	SV%	SO	G	A	PIM
Kari Lehtonen	36	35	1986:11	15	14	3	88	2.66	1050	0.916	1	0	2	0
Richard Bachman	13	8	608:50	6	5	0	33	3.25	288	0.885	0	0	0	0
Cristopher Nilstorp	5	5	291:18	1	3	1	15	3.09	146	0.897	0	0	0	0
Totals		48	2886:19	22	22	4	136	2.83	1484	0.908	1	0	2	0

^{†}Denotes player spent time with another team before joining the Stars. Stats reflect time with the Stars only.
^{‡}Traded mid-season
Bold/italics denotes franchise record

== Transactions ==
The Stars have been involved in the following transactions during the 2012–13 season:

=== Trades ===
June 22, 2012	To Washington Capitals Mike Ribeiro	To Dallas Stars Cody Eakin; 2nd-round pick in 2012
June 23, 2012	To Los Angeles Kings 7th-round pick in 2013	To Dallas Stars 7th-round pick in 2012
June 23, 2012	To Florida Panthers 7th-round pick in 2012	To Dallas Stars 7th-round pick in 2013
July 2, 2012	To Buffalo Sabres Steve Ott; Adam Pardy	To Dallas Stars Derek Roy
January 14, 2013	To Edmonton Oilers Mark Fistric	To Dallas Stars 3rd-round pick in 2013
January 24, 2013	To Pittsburgh Penguins Conditional 7th-round pick in 2013 (Note: Condition not satisfied.)	To Dallas Stars Carl Sneep
February 26, 2013	To Montreal Canadiens Michael Ryder; 3rd-round pick in 2013	To Dallas Stars Erik Cole
March 24, 2013	To Pittsburgh Penguins: Brenden Morrow; 3rd-round pick in 2013	To Dallas Stars: Joe Morrow; 5th-round pick in 2013
April 2, 2013	To Boston Bruins: Jaromir Jagr	To Dallas Stars: Lane MacDermid; Cody Payne; Conditional 2nd-round pick in 2013 (Note: Condition satisfied.)
April 2, 2013	To Vancouver Canucks: Derek Roy	To Dallas Stars: Kevin Connauton; 2nd-round pick in 2013
April 2, 2013	To Colorado Avalanche: Tomas Vincour	To Dallas Stars: Cameron Gaunce
June 8, 2013	To Ottawa Senators: Conditional 6th-round pick in 2013 (Note: Condition satisfied.)	To Dallas Stars: Sergei Gonchar (Note: Trade of negotiating rights to.)

=== Free agents signed ===
Player	Former team	Contract terms
Ray Whitney	Phoenix Coyotes	2 years, $9 million
Aaron Rome	Vancouver Canucks	3 years, $4.5 million
Antoine Roussel	Chicago Wolves	2 years, $1.225 million entry-level contract
Jaromir Jagr	Philadelphia Flyers	1 year, $4.55 million
Tyler Sloan	Milwaukee Admirals	1 year, $600,000
Maxime Lagace	P.E.I. Rocket	3 years, $1.705 million entry-level contract
Taylor Peters	Portland Winterhawks	3 years, $2.56 million entry-level contract
Curtis McKenzie	Miami University	2 years, $1.29 million entry-level contract

=== Free agents lost ===
Player	New team	Contract terms
Sheldon Souray	Anaheim Ducks	3 years, $11 million
Adam Burish	San Jose Sharks	4 years, $7.2 million
Andrew Raycroft	Hockey Milano Rossoblu	undisclosed
Jake Dowell	Minnesota Wild	2 years, $1.4 million
Radek Dvorak	Anaheim Ducks	1 year, $675,000

=== Player signings ===
Player	Date	Contract terms
Toby Petersen	July 2, 2012	2 years, $1.35 million
Radek Faksa	July 6, 2012	3 years, $2.775 million entry-level contract
Tom Wandell	July 6, 2012	1 year, $892,500
Brett Ritchie	July 11, 2012	3 years, $2.535 million entry-level contract
Troy Vance	July 11, 2012	3 years, $1.875 million entry-level contract
Richard Bachman	July 12, 2012	1 year, $625,000
Colton Sceviour	July 12, 2012	1 year, $525,000
Philip Larsen	July 13, 2012	2 years, $2.05 million
Maxime Fortunus	July 13, 2012	1 year, $650,000
Ludvig Bystrom	July 16, 2012	3 years, $2.51 million entry-level contract
Ryan Garbutt	July 16, 2012	2 years, $1.15 million
Luke Gazdic	July 16, 2012	1 year, $577,500
Mark Fistric	July 22, 2012	1 year, $1.475 million
Jordie Benn	July 25, 2012	1 year, $525,000
Kari Lehtonen	September 14, 2012	5 years, $29.5 million contract extension
Jamie Benn	January 24, 2013	5 years, $26.25 million
Sergei Gonchar	June 10, 2013	2 years, $10 million
Kevin Connauton	June 13, 2013	3 years, $2.05 million entry-level contract
Cristopher Nilstorp	June 17, 2013	1 year, $725,000
Travis Morin	June 20, 2013	2 years, $1.1 million
Colton Sceviour	June 20, 2013	1 year, $600,000
Matt Fraser	June 24, 2013	1 year, $625,000
Cameron Gaunce	June 24, 2013	1 year, $650,000

== Draft picks ==
Dallas Stars' picks at the 2012 NHL entry draft, held in Pittsburgh, Pennsylvania on June 22 & 23, 2012.

Round	#	Player	Pos	Nationality	College/Junior/Club team (League)
1	13	Radek Faksa	C	Czech Republic	Kitchener Rangers (OHL)
2	43	Ludvig Bystrom	D	Sweden	Modo Hockey J20 (J20 SuperElit)
2	54^{[a]}	Mike Winther	C	Canada	Prince Albert Raiders (WHL)
2	61^{[b]}	Devin Shore	C	Canada	Whitby Fury (OJHL)
3	74	Esa Lindell	D	Finland	Jokerit U20 (Jr. A SM-liiga)
4	104	Gemel Smith	C	Canada	Owen Sound Attack (OHL)
5	134	Branden Troock	RW	Canada	Seattle Thunderbirds (WHL)
5	144^{[c]}	Henri Kiviaho	G	Finland	KalPa U20 (Jr. A SM-liiga)
7	183^{[d]}	Dmitry Sinitsyn	D	Russia	University of Massachusetts Lowell (Hockey East)

Draft notes

- ^{a} The Washington Capitals' second-round pick (from Colorado via Toronto and Boston) went to the Dallas Stars as a result of a June 22, 2012, trade that sent Mike Ribeiro to the Capitals in exchange for Cody Eakin and this pick.
- ^{b} The Philadelphia Flyers' second-round pick (from Los Angeles) went to the Dallas Stars as a result of a February 16, 2012, trade that sent Nicklas Grossman to the Flyers in exchange for a 2013 third-round pick and this pick.
- ^{c} The Florida Panthers' fifth-round pick went to the Dallas Stars as a result of a December 6, 2011, trade that sent Krys Barch and a 2012 sixth-round pick to the Panthers in exchange for Jake Hauswirth and this pick.
- The Dallas Stars' sixth-round pick went to the Florida Panthers as the result of a December 6, 2011, trade that sent Jake Hauswirth and 2012 fifth-round pick to the Stars in exchange for Krys Barch and this pick.
- ^{d} The Los Angeles Kings' seventh-round pick (from Edmonton) went to the Dallas Stars as a result of a June 23, 2012, trade that sent a 2013 seventh-round pick to the Kings in exchange for this pick.
- The Dallas Stars' seventh-round pick went to the Florida Panthers as the result of a June 23, 2012, trade that sent a 2013 seventh-round pick to the Stars in exchange for this pick.

== See also ==
- 2012–13 NHL season
