= 2012–13 Vancouver Canucks season =

NHL hockey team season

2012–13 Vancouver Canucks
- Northwest Division champions
- Division: 1st Northwest
- Conference: 3rd Western
- 2012–13 record: 26–15–7
- Home record: 15–6–3
- Road record: 11–9–4
- Goals for: 127
- Goals against: 121

Team information
- General manager: Mike Gillis
- Coach: Alain Vigneault
- Captain: Henrik Sedin
- Alternate captains: Kevin Bieksa; Ryan Kesler; Manny Malhotra; Daniel Sedin
- Arena: Rogers Arena
- Average attendance: 18,947 (100.2%)
- Minor league affiliates: Chicago Wolves (AHL); Kalamazoo Wings (ECHL)

Team leaders
- Goals: Alex Burrows (13)
- Assists: Henrik Sedin (34)
- Points: Henrik Sedin (45)
- Penalty minutes: Alex Burrows (54)
- Plus/minus: Henrik Sedin (+19)
- Wins: Cory Schneider (17)
- Goals against average: Cory Schneider (2.11)

The 2012–13 Vancouver Canucks season was the team's 43rd season in the National Hockey League (NHL). The Canucks won their fifth-straight Northwest Division title and finished third in the Western Conference. In the 2013 Stanley Cup playoffs, Vancouver was swept by the San Jose Sharks in the first round. Shortly after the Canucks' playoff elimination, head coach Alain Vigneault was fired.

Prior to the beginning of the season the NHL Collective Bargaining Agreement (CBA) expired, resulting in a lockout. The season was threatened with cancellation before the lockout ended, ultimately the length of the labor dispute resulted in the reduction of games from the standard 82 to a shortened 48. Cory Schneider entered the season as the team's new starting goaltender, while the Canucks attempted to trade incumbent Roberto Luongo. The two goaltenders battled for playing time early in the season resulting in a goaltender controversy. After a six-game winning streak to start February, the Canucks dealt with multiple injuries and suspensions resulting in the team slumping. In late March Schneider captured the starters job starting seven consecutive games helping the team to a second six-game winning streak. Vancouver dueled the Minnesota Wild in the standings before pulling away in April and winning the division. Led by Henrik and Daniel Sedin, the Canucks' power play struggled dropping from 4th the previous season to 23rd, with the Sedin twins' point production declining. Derek Roy was brought in through a trade to help deal with injuries at centre in the team's only trade of the year. Schneider was injured late in the season and missed the first two games of the playoffs. Vancouver lost the fourth game of their playoff series on a controversial call on Daniel Sedin.

Three franchise records were set during the season. Henrik Sedin became the Canucks all-time leading scorer, surpassing Markus Naslund. Alex Burrows scored six seconds into a game making it the fastest goal to start a game for Vancouver. Alain Vigneault became the all-time leader in games coached. As a way of celebrating 100 years of hockey in British Columbia, the Canucks wore a special patch on their jerseys with the logo of the Vancouver Millionaires, the first professional team in the city. They also wore replica jerseys of the Millionaires for one game.

== Off-season ==
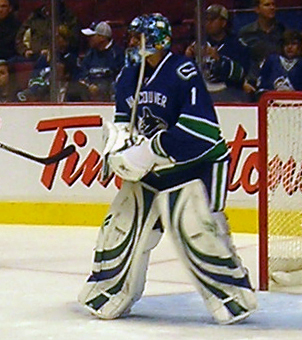
Trade rumors involving Roberto Luongo started in the off-season.

Following an early exit from the 2012 Stanley Cup playoffs, the off-season began with speculation that head coach Alain Vigneault might be fired. There were also rumors that general manager (GM) Mike Gillis could be removed from his position. After an end of the year meeting with team owner Francesco Aquilini, Gillis signed a new five-year contract. Fifteen days after his new contract, Gillis signed Vigneault to a new two-year contract.

The Canucks announced that they would be celebrating 100 years of hockey in British Columbia during the season. To that end, they would wear a special patch on their jerseys with the logo of the Vancouver Millionaires, the first professional team in the city. They also would wear replica jerseys of the Millionaires for their March 16 game against the Detroit Red Wings.

After being replaced as starter for the final three playoff games, Roberto Luongo said that he would be willing to waive his no-trade clause if asked. Following the re-signing of Cory Schneider to a three-year $12 million extension, trade rumors increased. It was later reported that Luongo wanted to be traded and that "it was time to move on". Though as training camp approached, Luongo had not been traded. He indicated that he would have no issues returning to the Canucks. Gillis further stated that although he had received several "strong" offers, the Canucks were not having a "fire sale" for Luongo. Doug MacLean on Sportsnet's Hockey Central reported that a trade was in place to send Luongo to the Toronto Maple Leafs. However, Luongo, believing the Florida Panthers, his preferred destination, were going to make a deal for him, refused to waive his no-trade clause. Luongo later said that he never turned down a trade.

=== 2012–13 lockout ===
Prior to the NHL Collective Bargaining Agreement (CBA) expiring in September, teams reassigned players on two-way or entry-level contracts to minor league affiliates. The Canucks assigned 27 players, including Christopher Tanev, Eddie Lack, Zack Kassian and 2012 second-round draft pick Alexandre Mallet to the Chicago Wolves, while first-round pick Brendan Gaunce was sent to his junior team, the Belleville Bulls. When the CBA expired on September 15, the NHL enforced a lockout until a new agreement could be reached. Canucks management posted a message from the team to the fans stating that they would continue with community initiatives throughout the lockout, which they hoped would be resolved as soon as possible, and thanked fans for their loyalty and patience. They also reduced their employees work week to four days and instituted a 20% pay reduction.

Four days into the lockout, the NHL cancelled all pre-season games before September 30, cutting the first four games from Vancouver's schedule. A week later, with no further talks between the two sides, the remainder of the preseason was canceled. With no movement on a new deal, the NHL cancelled its first set of regular season games on October 4. Games continued to be cancelled in blocks culminating in their cancellation through January 14. As the lockout dragged on, NHL Commissioner Gary Bettman gave a self-imposed a deadline of January 11 to agree to terms on a new CBA or the entire season would be cancelled. As the deadline approached, Bettman and the head of the National Hockey League Players' Association (NHLPA), Donald Fehr, engaged in a 16-hour negotiation session that produced a tentative agreement to end the lockout. Both sides ratified the deal and a memorandum of understanding was signed on January 12. This officially ended the lockout and allowed training camps to open the following day. Due to the length of the lockout, the NHL announced a new scheduled for a shortened 48-game season after it ended.

=== Training camp ===
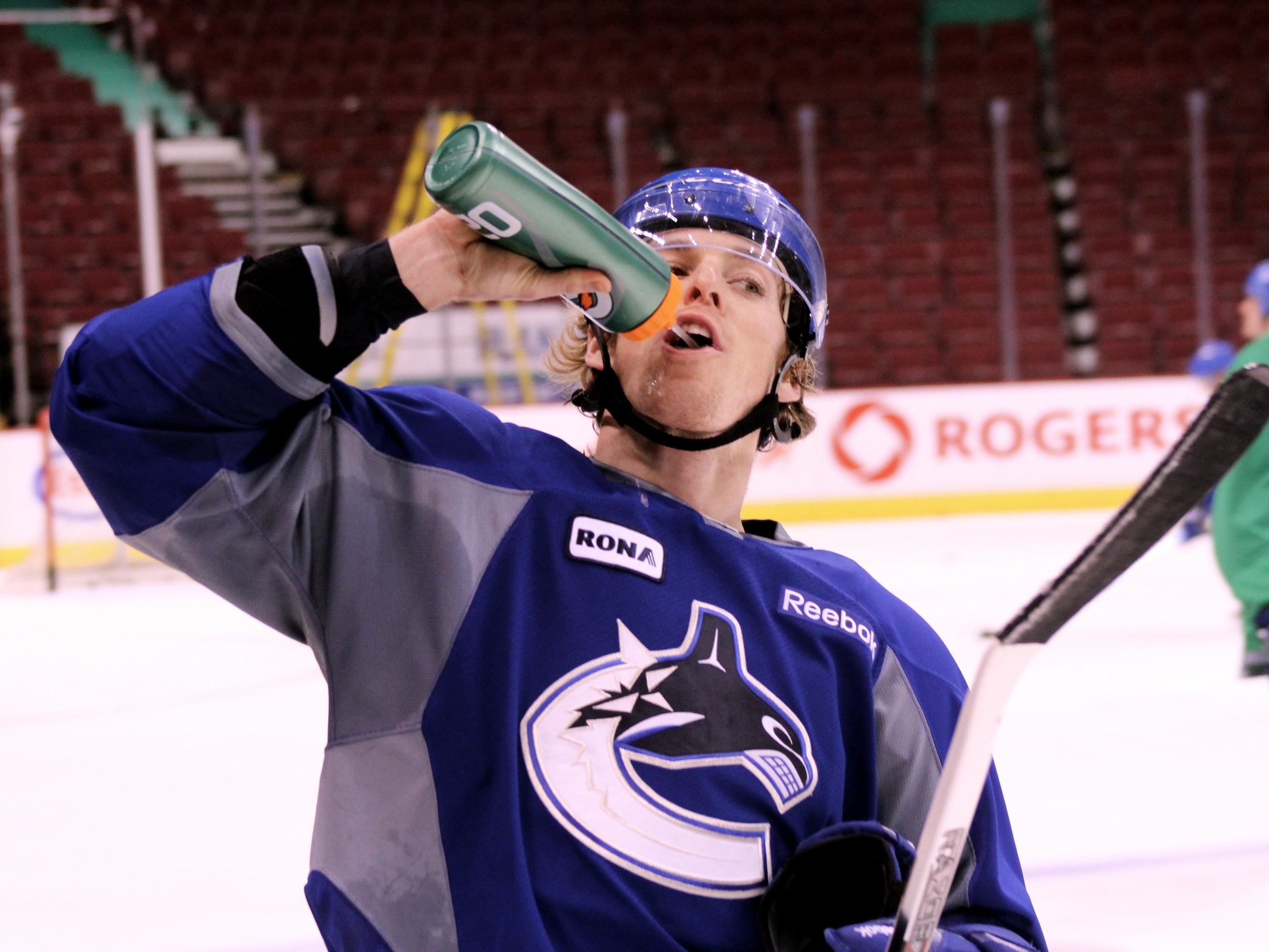
David Booth was injured in training camp.

Under the prior CBA, players could not be traded until after the lockout was resolved, meaning Roberto Luongo could not be moved. Once a new CBA was reached, the trade rumors returned, including one that alleged Maple Leafs GM Brian Burke was fired in order to help facilitate a trade. For his part, Luongo reiterated that he was willing to remain with the Canucks for the shortened season, but did not want to remain long-term.

With training camp starting on January 13, 2013, Vancouver recalled 12 players from the Wolves. They also bolstered their defence corp by signing NHL veterans Jim Vandermeer and Cam Barker to one-year contracts. At the forward position, the Canucks were dealing with injuries to their second line. Centre Ryan Kesler, who was recovering from off-season surgeries to his shoulder and wrist, would be unable to start the season; it was unknown how long he would be out rehabbing the injuries. Winger David Booth was injured during the team's physicals to start camp. After having an MRI done on his injury, it was announced that Booth would miss four to six weeks recovering. Alain Vigneault stated that he hoped to keep his third and fourth lines intact, leaving the possible replacements as, Andrew Ebbett, Jordan Schroeder and Zack Kassian. Schroeder was a first-round draft pick for Vancouver in 2009, but had never played in an NHL game. Ebbett a utility, journeyman forward played in 18 games for Vancouver in 2011–12. While the second-year Kassian produced only four goals in his rookie campaign. Vancouver elected to start the season with Ebbett and put Kassian on their second line. In order to keep defensive depth, the Canucks decided to keep nine defenceman. Schroeder was sent back to the minors in order to comply with the 23-man roster and because he would not need to clear waivers.

== Regular season ==
=== January ===
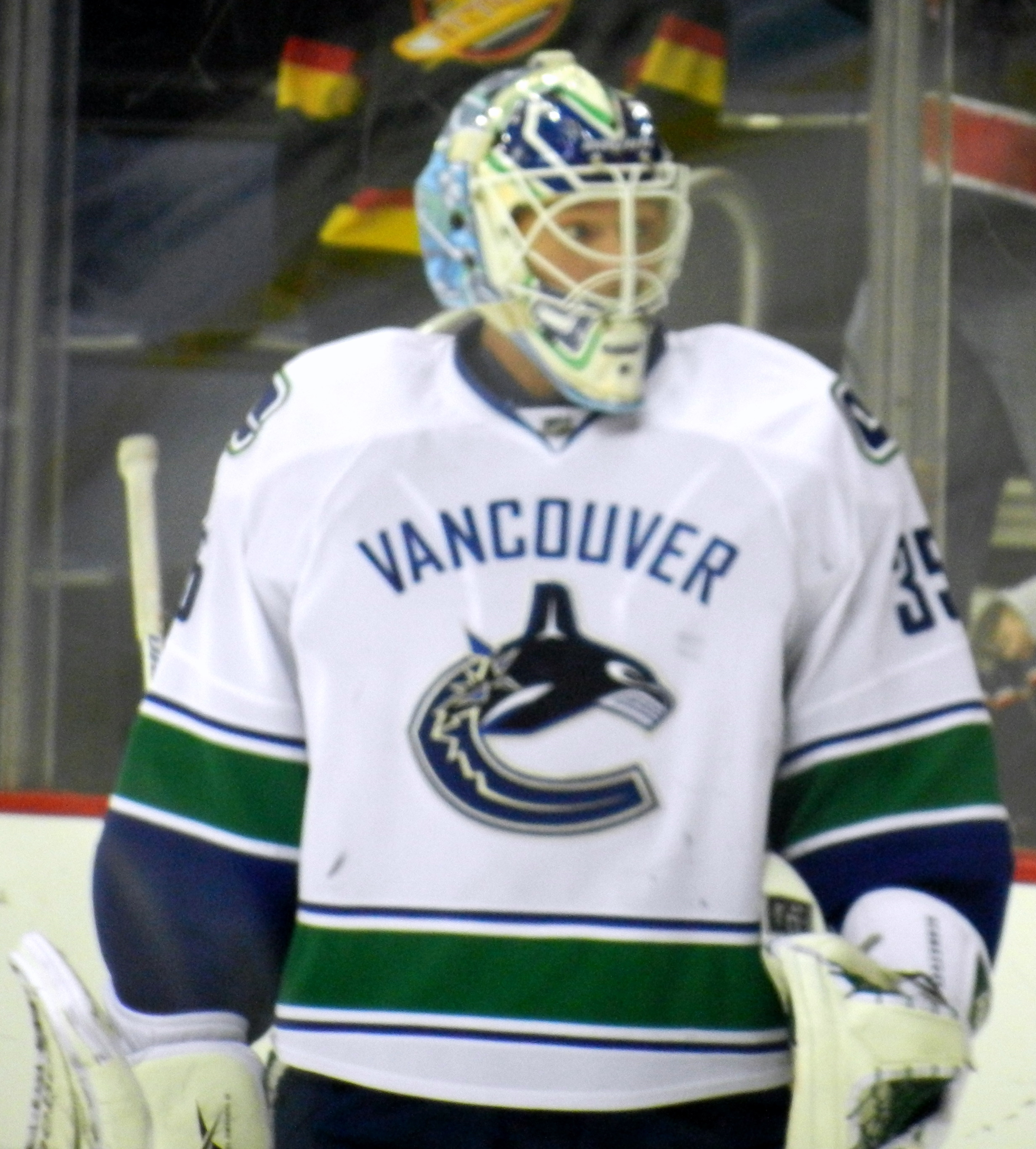
Cory Schneider was pulled from the game in his debut as Vancouver's starting goaltender.

After winning back-to-back Presidents' Trophies in prior two seasons the Canucks were projected as Stanley Cup contenders once more. The prediction was based on Vancouver's team depth, the offense provided by Daniel and Henrik Sedin, the two-way play of Kesler and Alexandre Burrows, plus the versatility of the Canuck's top four defenceman. The Hockey News predicted that the Canucks would win the Northwest Division and finish as the second place team in the Western Conference.

Schneider began the year as the team's starting goaltender. In his first game against the Anaheim Ducks on January 9, 2013, Schneider allowed five goals on 14 shots and was pulled midway through the second period. When Luongo entered the game he was given a standing ovation from the crowd. Luongo gave up another two goals as the Canucks lost 7–3. In the post-game interview, Schneider took the blame for the loss, saying, "It was unacceptable to play that way and to put my team in that situation and not even give them a chance to win." He also stated he would work hard to fix the mistakes, while Luongo said of his ovation that it was "a fun moment." The situation quickly led to a goalie controversy. Luongo made the start the following night against the Edmonton Oilers. According to Vigneault, he had already determined the starting assignments for the opening two games, and Schneider did not factor into Luongo's start. In the game, Luongo allowed two goals after Vancouver had taken a 2–0 lead. The Canucks lost the game 3–2 in a shootout. Luongo failed to stop either of the two shooters he faced, while Vancouver did not score. After losing their first two games, Vancouver added to their forward depth recalling Jordan Schroeder from the AHL and assigning Jim Vandermeer to the Wolves. Schroeder took over the second line duties after Andrew Ebbett went pointless in the first two contests.

Schneider started Vancouver's next game against the Calgary Flames. For the second-straight game, Vancouver lost a two-goal lead in a game which eventually went to a shootout. In contrast to his first start, Schneider had a strong game, making 34 saves by the end of overtime. In the shootout, he stopped four of the five shooters he faced, earning the Canucks their first win of the season. Two nights later, as they began their first road trip, the Canucks played a rematch with the Ducks in Anaheim. Schneider made the start and earned some redemption, stopping all 30 Anaheim shots, helping the Canucks to the 5–0 win and earning his fifth career shutout. Following the win, Schneider started the next game, a 4–1 loss to the San Jose Sharks. Luongo started the next four games, finishing off the month of January and beginning February. Vigneault joked that he was making his starting goaltender decisions based on coin tosses. He further noted that the two goaltenders were team guys and they would do what was asked of them and never complain. The coin became a running joke for Vigneault and the Canucks in general, as Ryan Kesler stated he flipped it before announcing his return from injury.

=== February ===
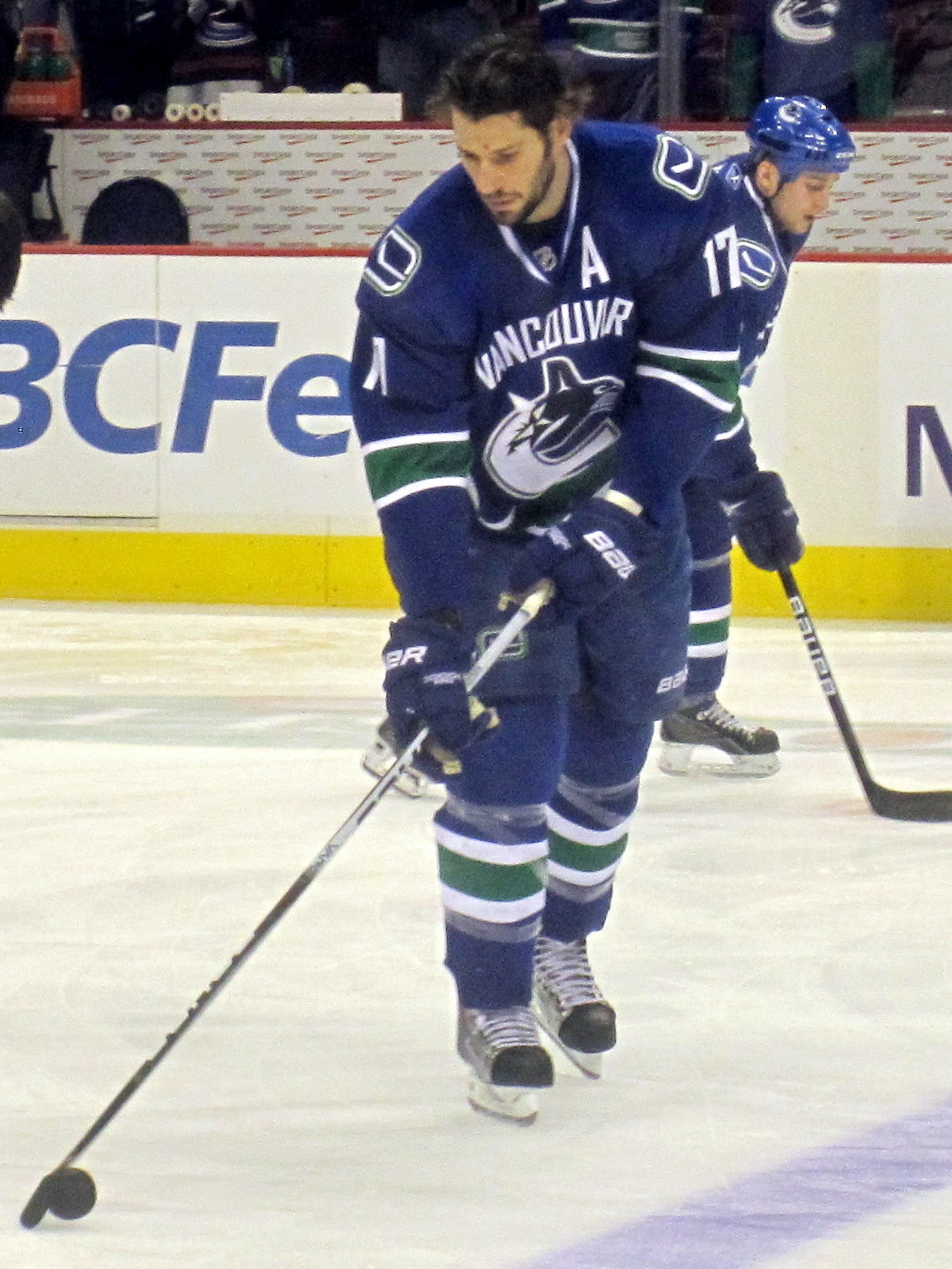
Ryan Kesler broke his foot in his first game of the season.

At forward, Kassian began the year on the top line with the Sedin twins. Kassian scored five goals in the first seven games of the season. Partway through the Canucks' second game of February, Kassian was replaced on the top line by Alexandre Burrows. Kassian was dropped to the third line. Despite Kassian surpassing his goal total from his rookie season, the Sedins started the year with their lowest output in nearly ten years, combining for 14 points in the first 10 games. Coinciding with the line changes, Vancouver went on a six-game winning streak between the end of January and their February 12 game. After the last game of their winning streak, the Canucks were expecting Kesler to return to the line-up.

As Kesler was returning from injury, Vancouver placed centre Manny Malhotra on injured reserve (IR) for the remainder of the season. In regards to the move, Gillis stated he felt Malhotra was vulnerable to serious injury because of an eye injury he suffered in 2011. The decision was made despite Malhotra playing in 78 games in the 2011–12 season and nine games in 2013. Gillis further noted that he had reservation about him playing in the previous season, but wanted to give Malhotra a chance to adapt. After watching him play, Gillis did not see the types of changes that would not put him at a higher risk of injury. Upon placing Malhotra on IR, Gillis called it the hardest thing he had done as a GM. NHL Deputy Commissioner Bill Daly released a statement on the situation, saying "the League is satisfied and has approved the team's and player's joint decision to discontinue the player's participation in NHL games at this time on the basis of the player's current medical condition and the risk of injury that such condition poses." The Canucks also announced that Malhotra would remain with the team in some capacity, but would not return to the ice including in the playoffs.

Kesler played his first game of the season on February 15 against the Dallas Stars. The game was also witness to a piece of Canucks history as Henrik Sedin recorded two assists to pass Markus Naslund as the franchise's all-time leading scorer, with 757 points. After recording the record setting point, Sedin was given a standing ovation that carried on as play continued. After three minutes the play stopped, and Sedin saluted the crowd. During a commercial break, the Canucks ran a tribute video for the accomplishment, featuring congratulations from Naslund and Trevor Linden, the third-leading scorer in team history. As for Kesler, he registered an assist and blocked three shots in over 17 minutes of ice time of the 4–3 loss. After experiencing some discomfort in his right foot, Kesler had X-rays taken. The X-rays were negative and he continued to play.

Four days after Kesler's return, Jannik Hansen was involved in a controversial hit on the Chicago Blackhawks' Marian Hossa. As both players went up for an airborne puck, Hansen struck Hossa in the back of the head with his forearm and elbow. Hossa then laid on the ice for a few minutes, during which time the training staff examined him before he was able to leave under his own power. Hansen was given a two-minute minor for roughing and Hossa did not return to the game. Opinions of the hit varied with former NHL referee Kerry Fraser, stating that he did not believe that there was any deliberate or malicious intent, and that he would be surprised if Hansen received a suspension for the play. Meanwhile, former Blackhawks analyst Ed Olczyk stated, "there's no doubt in my mind, once he didn't play the puck, he had one thing in his mind, and that was to put his forearm or elbow in the back of the head of Marian Hossa," and he would be surprised if Hansen was not suspended. Hossa returned to practice the following day. Hansen was suspended for one game due to what Brendan Shanahan called "the carelessness and force of which the blow was delivered."

With Kesler back in the lineup, the Canucks were inconstant posting a 2–3–2 record.^{[note 1]} Kesler registered five points in the seven games, but was playing with the discomfort steaming from a blocked shot in his first game back against Dallas. He was given a CT scan for his peace of mind. The results of the scan revealed a fracture in his foot. Though no time table for his return was given, the expectation was that he would be out of the line-up for four-to-six weeks. Late in the month, Kevin Bieksa suffered a groin injury in a game versus the Nashville Predators. He missed the next two games as Vancouver finished the month with back-to-back losses. After being reunited with Burrows, the Sedin twins registered a combined 18 points in the final six games of February, while Kassian tallied only three assists in the 11 games after his demotion.

=== March ===
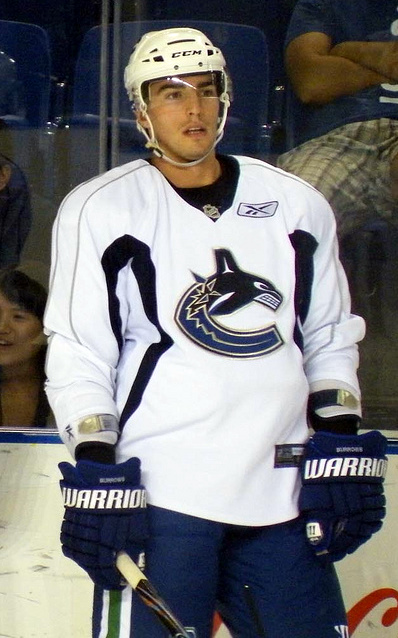
Alexandre Burrows set a Canucks franchise record for fastest goal to start a game in March.

Bieksa returned for the first game in the month of March, a 5–2 win over the Los Angeles Kings. During the game, he re-aggravated the injury and was listed as day-to-day. With Bieksa and Kesler out, Vancouver slumped dropping three straight games going 0–1–2. Entering their March 10 game against the Minnesota Wild, the lead for the Northwest Division was at stake. A regulation win for the Wild would give them the lead based on tie breakers. Vancouver lost the game 4–2 and dropped to sixth place in the Western Conference. The Canucks reclaimed the division lead two days later with a win over the Columbus Blue Jackets. In the March 16 game against Detroit, Alexandre Burrows set a franchise record when he scored six seconds into the game, making it the fastest goal to start a game in team history. Vancouver failed to capitalize on the early lead, losing the game 5–2 and falling back into a tie with the Wild. The Canucks re-matched the Wild two days later with a chance to take sole possession of the division lead. Vancouver took the lead in the second scoring on the power play. The goal marked the first power play tally in 11 games, ending a 0–36 slump, the worst in franchise history. Much like the Detroit game, the Canucks failed to take advantage of the early lead and lost the game 3–1 and fell to seventh in the Conference.

Schneider started Vancouver's next game and earned the win against the St. Louis Blues. The win marked the beginning of a six-game winning streak with Schneider as the starting goaltender each game. He allowed a total of six goals during the steak and posted two shutouts. The wins put the Canucks back into first in the Northwest. In the second game of their winning streak, defenceman Alexander Edler collided with Phoenix Coyotes' goaltender Mike Smith and was given a five-minute major for charging. The following day, Edler was given a two-game suspension for his actions. Also during the Canucks' winning streak, they began to have injury problems. Booth suffered a leg injury that required surgery which ended his season. In 12 games played, Booth scored only a single goal into an empty net. Winger Dale Weise injured a shoulder. Kassian suffered a back injury, and Steve Pinizzotto missed games due to an illness. With the forward corps depleted, defenceman Keith Ballard was moved to forward. He continued to play upfront until he suffered a broken foot.

In his seventh consecutive start, Schneider gave up two early goals to the Edmonton Oilers and was pulled in favor of Luongo. The goals were scored on Edmonton's first two shots. Goals continued to come in quick succession as Taylor Hall scored his second goal, Edmonton's third, 2:34 into the game, setting an Oilers franchise record for the fastest three goals to start a game. Hall set another Edmonton record minutes later when he completed the hat-trick at 7:58 in the first. It marked the fastest hat-trick to start a game, surpassing Wayne Gretzky's previous record. Vancouver did not allow another goal, but failed to score, losing 4–0. They were again passed by Minnesota for the division lead and finished March as the fourth-placed team in the Western Conference.

=== April ===
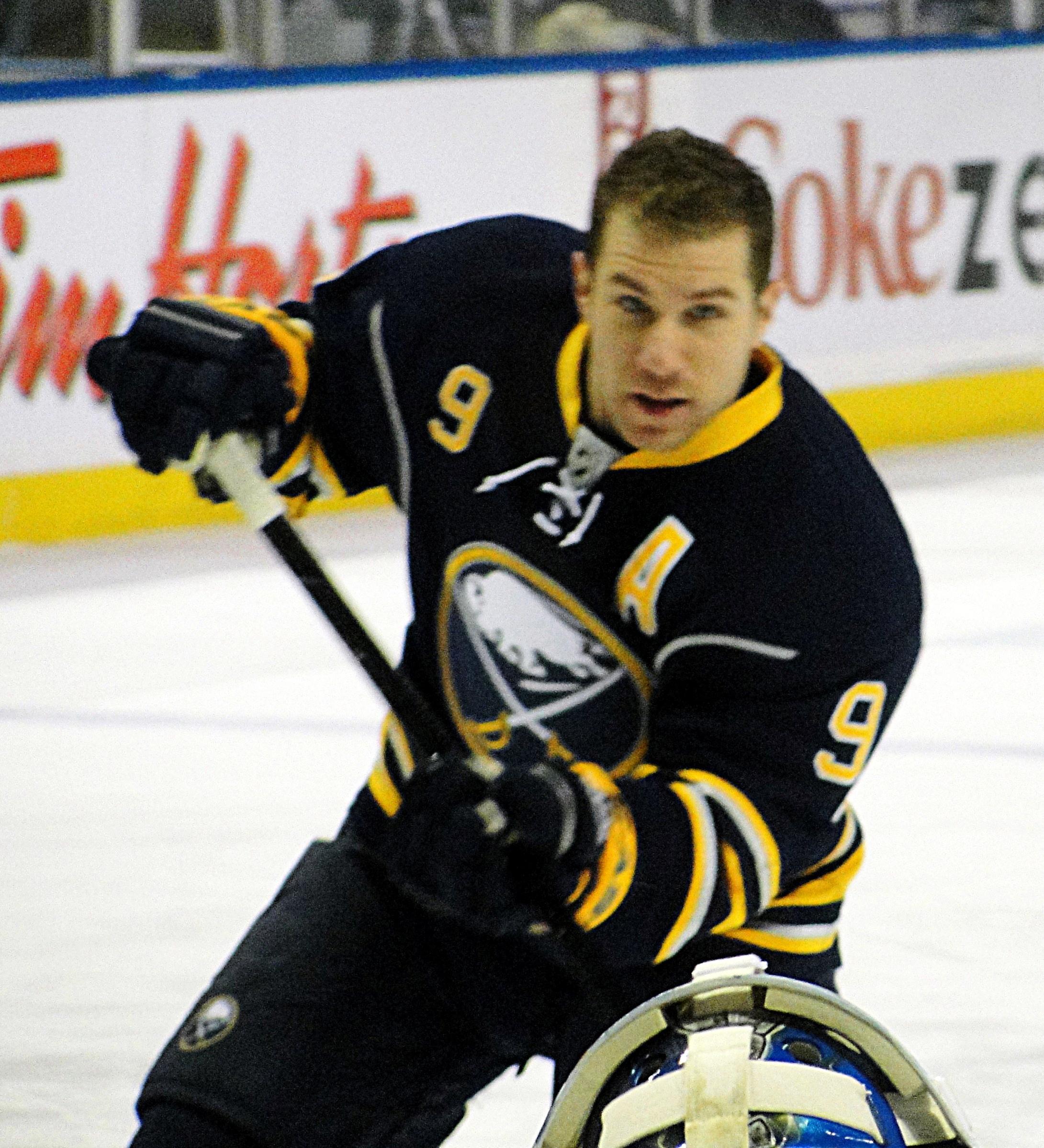
Derek Roy was acquired around the trade deadline to help add offense.

In their first game of April, Vancouver attempted to improve its offensive production by re-calling their 2011 first round draft choice, Nicklas Jensen, and forward Bill Sweatt. The recalls failed to produce, however, as the Canucks lost to the San Jose Sharks 3–2. The following day, the Canucks acquired centre Derek Roy from the Dallas Stars for Kevin Connauton and a second-round draft pick. The trade was believed to be an attempt to fill a hole at centre while Kesler was out with an injury. The expectation was that Roy would become the team's third line center once Kesler returned to the line-up, though the possibility of the two playing together was proposed. At the NHL trade deadline, Vancouver failed to trade Luongo. They were reportedly close to a deal with the Toronto Maple Leafs, which eventually fell through. In response to finding out that he would not be traded, Luongo stated, "My contract sucks – that's what's the problem," and would "scrap it if I could now." The Canucks felt they needed more size and grit in their line-up and attempted to add some through trades. However, they missed out on acquiring Ryane Clowe and Raffi Torres. Clowe chose to waive his no-trade clause to go to the New York Rangers so he could play in the Eastern Conference. The Coyotes traded Torres to the Sharks, as they considered San Jose's third-round pick more attractive than the Canucks' third-rounder.

In his first game as a Canuck, Roy tallied an assist helping Vancouver to a 4–0 win. The win moved the Canucks past Minnesota for the division lead. The shutout marked Schneider's fourth of the season, which doubled his career total. Two games later, Schneider registered his fifth shutout of the season in a 2–0 over the Coyotes, tying him for the League lead. The game also marked the return of Kesler, who scored the game-winning goal. Minnesota slumped towards the end of the season and the Canucks won their fifth-straight Northwest Division title with a 2–1 victory over the Blackhawks. In the game, Schneider suffered a groin injury and was unable to play the last two games of the season; he was listed by the Canucks as day-to-day with a "body" injury. With Schneider out, the Canucks lost their final two regular season games. In their final loss, Vigneault rested many of his regulars, though he received criticism for playing Henrik Sedin for only 22 seconds. Furthermore, Sedin left the bench after his one shift. The Los Angeles Times' Helene Elliott called it a cheap way of keeping Sedin's ironman streak intact. For his part, Henrik Sedin told Vigneault that "he would be okay with sitting out the game" and to him the streak is just "a number in the paper." Vigneault responded by telling Sedin that "he's not going to be the one that breaks the streak," and he gave him the choice to remain on the bench or return to the locker room. Sedin felt remaining on the bench would have been a further distraction and chose to leave. By season's end, the Sedin twins' point production dropped from the previous years. Henrik's point points-per-game average was the lowest it had been since 2007–08, while Daniel's was his worst since 2003–04. The Cauncks' power play also struggled throughout the year dropping from fourth in 2011–12 to 23rd in the League.

== Playoffs ==
Vancouver entered the playoffs as the Western Conference's third seed by virtue of winning the Northwest Division. As a result, they faced the sixth-seeded San Jose Sharks. The series was a rematch of the 2011 Western Conference Finals, in which Vancouver defeated the Sharks in five games to advance to the 2011 Stanley Cup Finals. However, the Sharks had won all three of the regular season games during the season.

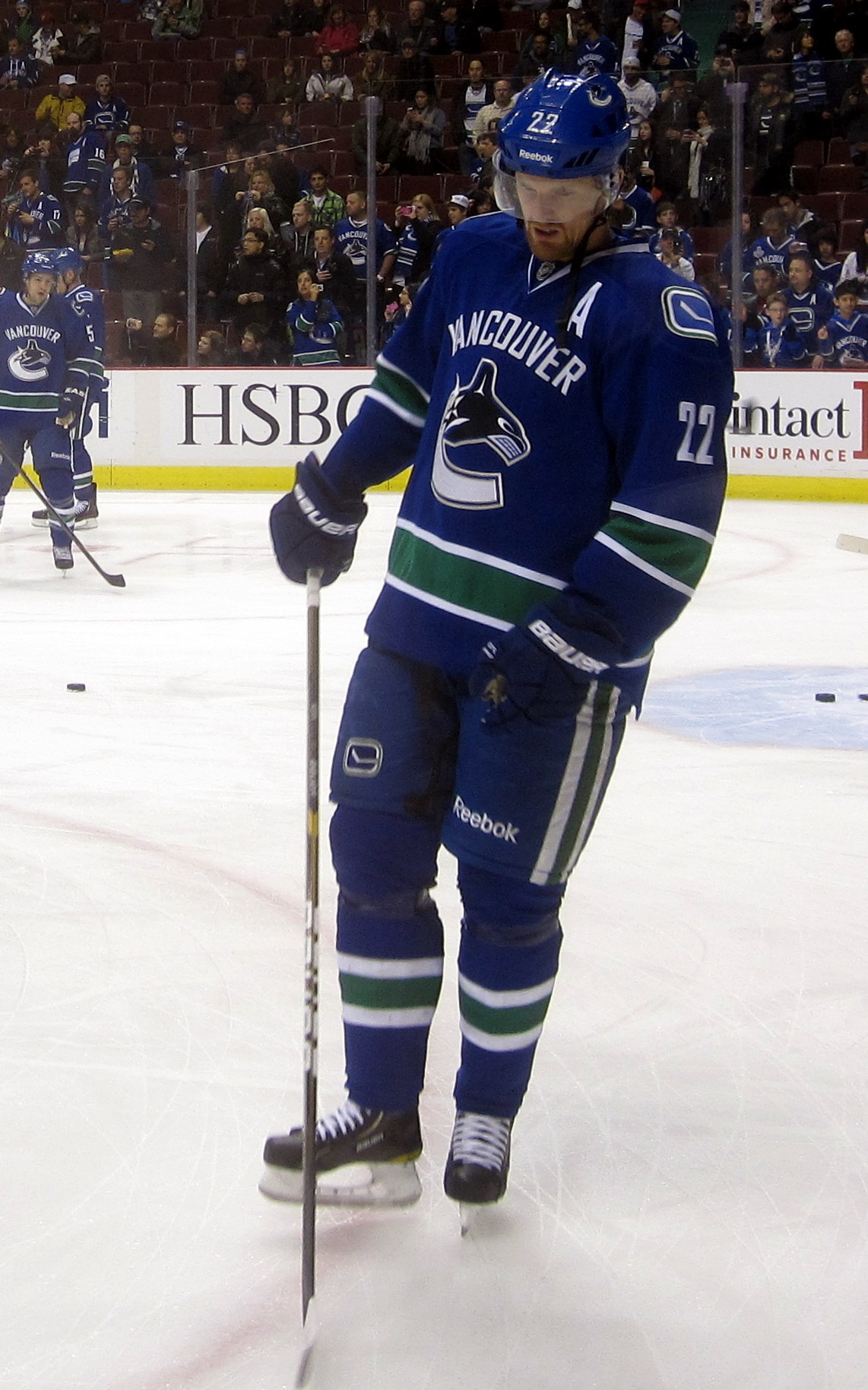
Daniel Sedin's penalty in overtime lead to a Game 4 loss.

With Schneider still injured, Luongo started the first game of the series. There was concern that Kesler would also be unable to play in Game 1. When asked about Kesler, Vigneault joked, "We've got him locked in a back room. We're feeding him raw meat. The beast will be ready tonight." Luongo started strong, holding the Sharks scoreless in the first period despite the Canucks being outshot 6–1 in the first 4:06 of the game. Vancouver took a 1–0 lead midway through the second, though San Jose tied the game shortly after and added two more goals in the third to win the game 3–1. Luongo finished with 25 saves, Kesler played over 21 minutes, registering only two shots and finishing as a –1. Leading up to Game 2, Kesler vowed to be better. It was also rumored he had the flu in Game 1. Schneider was still unable to play, and there were concerns he would not be traveling with the team to San Jose for Game 3. In Game 2, the Canucks trailed 1–0 after two periods of play. In the third period, Kesler scored a power play goal to tie the game and six minutes later, capitalized on a Sharks turnover to put Vancouver up 2–1. With Canucks leading late, San Jose pulled their goaltender for the extra attacker. With the net empty, Jannik Hansen had a chance to put the game away but missed the net. Shortly after with the play in Vancouver's end, Henrik Sedin attempted to make a pass to the middle of the ice which resulted in a turnover. On the ensuing play, a Dan Boyle shot deflected off Alexander Edler and through the pads of Luongo. The puck stopped short of the goal line, but Patrick Marleau tapped the puck in to tie the game. In overtime, a blocked shot led to an odd man rush for the Sharks, resulting in Raffi Torres scoring the game-winning goal. The loss put the Canucks down 2–0 in the series. Vancouver had never won a series after losing the first two games.

Schneider returned from injury to play in Game 3 after missing two weeks. After the first two periods, the Canucks trailed 2–1. The Sharks scored quickly in the third period and by the 4:07 mark had scored three goals to make it a 5–1 game. After the fifth goal, Schneider was pulled and replaced by Luongo. Vancouver eventually lost the game 5–2, with Schneider making 23 saves on 28 shots. Luongo stopped all 10 shots he faced. In the post-game press conference, Schneider stated he felt good, but did not do enough to help out his teammates. Later, questions were raised about who would be the starter for Game 4. Luongo stated he would be ready if asked to play, but also stated he would be supportive of Schneider if he was the starter. Sharks' centre Joe Thornton stated that San Jose felt Luongo had played great in the first two games, and they were lucky not to have to face him in Game 3. In Game 4, Schneider made the start and after two periods, the Canucks trailed 2–1. Midway through the third period, Vancouver had taken the lead, but late in the period, San Jose tied the game with a power play goal to force overtime. In the extra period, Daniel Sedin checked Tommy Wingels, which sent the Sharks winger's head into the boards. Sedin was given a controversial boarding penalty on the play. On the ensuing power play, San Jose scored to win the game and complete the series sweep. After the goal was scored, Daniel voiced his opinion of the call to the referees and was given a game misconduct penalty for abusive language. When asked about the call after the game, he replied, "It's the playoffs. It's shoulder to shoulder," and it was a bad call, though he further noted that the Canucks did not lose the series on the call. Brother Henrik noted that it was "a bullshit call" also pointing out that it was shoulder to shoulder. Referee Kelly Sutherland explained the call by stating he deemed it a violent shove into the boards where the player could not defend himself. For his part, Schneider made 43 saves on 47 shots in Game 4, he stated that he was 100% healthy and his groin injury was not a factor in his play.

== Post-season ==
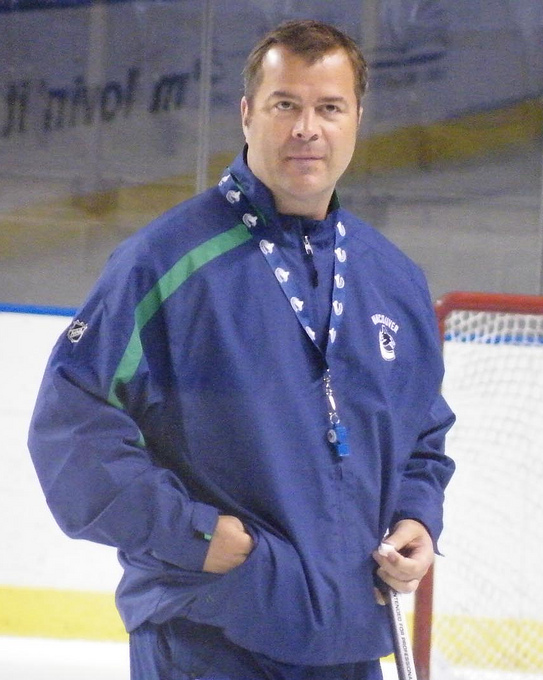
Alain Vigneault was fired following the Canucks playoff elimination.

At an end of the season press conference, GM Mike Gillis stated the Canucks would "hit the reset button on a number of different fronts." Days later Vigneault was fired, along with assistant coaches, Rick Bowness and Newell Brown. Vigneault left as the all-time winningest coach in Canucks history, while winning two Presidents' Trophies and six Northwest Division titles. A month later, John Tortorella was hired as the new head coach. Tortorella had been fired by the New York Rangers earlier in the off-season following a second round playoff loss to the Boston Bruins.

After the coaching situation had been settled, Gillis next turned his attention back to trading Luongo. The Canucks were hoping to make a deal at the 2013 NHL entry draft. As the draft approached, it was reported the Canucks were also shopping Schneider. Originally, it was believed the rumors were an attempt by Gillis to gain leverage for any potential Luongo deals. However, in a surprise move, Schneider was traded to the New Jersey Devils for the ninth overall pick in the draft, which Vancouver used to select Bo Horvat. Fans, as well as both Luongo and Schneider, were shocked by the news. Luongo stated, "I have to let this sink in and figure out what I'm going to do." While Schneider stated he was not sure what to say or think and he was speechless, adding, "it was nice to have resolution to the situation."

== Standings ==
=== Divisional standings ===
Northwest Division
Pos	Team	GP	W	L	OTL	ROW	GF	GA	GD	Pts
1	y – Vancouver Canucks	48	26	15	7	21	127	121	+6	59
2	x – Minnesota Wild	48	26	19	3	22	122	127	−5	55
3	Edmonton Oilers	48	19	22	7	17	125	134	−9	45
4	Calgary Flames	48	19	25	4	19	128	160	−32	42
5	Colorado Avalanche	48	16	25	7	14	116	152	−36	39

Source: National Hockey League
x – Clinched playoff spot; y – Clinched division

=== Conference standings ===
Western Conference
Pos	Div	Team	GP	W	L	OTL	ROW	GF	GA	GD	Pts
1	CE	p – Chicago Blackhawks	48	36	7	5	30	155	102	+53	77
2	PA	y – Anaheim Ducks	48	30	12	6	24	140	118	+22	66
3	NW	y – Vancouver Canucks	48	26	15	7	21	127	121	+6	59
4	CE	x – St. Louis Blues	48	29	17	2	24	129	115	+14	60
5	PA	x – Los Angeles Kings	48	27	16	5	25	133	118	+15	59
6	PA	x – San Jose Sharks	48	25	16	7	17	124	116	+8	57
7	CE	x – Detroit Red Wings	48	24	16	8	22	124	115	+9	56
8	NW	x – Minnesota Wild	48	26	19	3	22	122	127	−5	55
9	CE	Columbus Blue Jackets	48	24	17	7	19	120	119	+1	55
10	PA	Phoenix Coyotes	48	21	18	9	17	125	131	−6	51
11	PA	Dallas Stars	48	22	22	4	20	130	142	−12	48
12	NW	Edmonton Oilers	48	19	22	7	17	125	134	−9	45
13	NW	Calgary Flames	48	19	25	4	19	128	160	−32	42
14	CE	Nashville Predators	48	16	23	9	14	111	139	−28	41
15	NW	Colorado Avalanche	48	16	25	7	14	116	152	−36	39

Source: National Hockey League
p – Clinched Presidents' Trophy; x – Clinched playoff spot; y – Clinched division

== Schedule and results ==
=== Regular season ===
2012–13 game log

January: 3–2–2 (home: 2–1–1; road: 1–1–1)
#	Date	Visitor	Score	Home	OT	Decision	Attendance	Record	Pts	Recap
1	January 19	Anaheim	7–3	Vancouver		Schneider	18,910	0–1–0	0	Recap
2	January 20	Edmonton	3–2	Vancouver	SO	Luongo	18,910	0–1–1	1	Recap
3	January 23	Calgary	2–3	Vancouver	SO	Schneider	18,910	1–1–1	3	Recap
4	January 25	Vancouver	5–0	Anaheim		Schneider	17,529	2–1–1	5	Recap
5	January 27	Vancouver	1–4	San Jose		Schneider	17,562	2–2–1	5	Recap
6	January 28	Vancouver	2–3	Los Angeles	SO	Luongo	18,344	2–2–2	6	Recap
7	January 30	Colorado	0–3	Vancouver		Luongo	18,910	3–2–2	8	Recap

February: 7–3–2 (home: 3–2–1; road: 4–1–1)
#	Date	Visitor	Score	Home	OT	Decision	Attendance	Record	Pts	Recap
8	February 1	Chicago	1–2	Vancouver	SO	Luongo	18,910	4–2–2	10	Recap
9	February 4	Vancouver	3–2	Edmonton	OT	Luongo	16,839	5–2–2	12	Recap
10	February 7	Vancouver	4–1	Minnesota		Schneider	18,352	6–2–2	14	Recap
11	February 9	Calgary	1–5	Vancouver		Schneider	18,910	7–2–2	16	Recap
12	February 12	Minnesota	1–2	Vancouver		Luongo	18,910	8–2–2	18	Recap
13	February 15	Dallas	4–3	Vancouver		Schneider	18,910	8–3–2	18	Recap
14	February 17	St. Louis	4–3	Vancouver	SO	Luongo	18,910	8–3–3	19	Recap
15	February 19	Vancouver	3–4	Chicago	SO	Schneider	21,423	8–3–4	20	Recap
16	February 21	Vancouver	4–3	Dallas		Schneider	17,393	9–3–4	22	Recap
17	February 22	Vancouver	1–0	Nashville		Luongo	17,113	10–3–4	24	Recap
18	February 24	Vancouver	3–8	Detroit		Luongo	20,066	10–4–4	24	Recap
19	February 26	Phoenix	4–2	Vancouver		Schneider	18,910	10–5–4	24	Recap

March: 9–5–2 (home: 5–2–1; road: 4–3–1)
#	Date	Visitor	Score	Home	OT	Decision	Attendance	Record	Pts	Recap
20	March 2	Los Angeles	2–5	Vancouver		Schneider	18,910	11–5–4	26	Recap
21	March 3	Vancouver	2–4	Calgary		Luongo	19,289	11–6–4	26	Recap
22	March 5	San Jose	3–2	Vancouver	SO	Schneider	18,910	11–6–5	27	Recap
23	March 7	Vancouver	1–2	Columbus	OT	Schneider	13,632	11–6–6	28	Recap
24	March 10	Vancouver	2–4	Minnesota		Schneider	18,846	11–7–6	28	Recap
25	March 12	Vancouver	2–1	Columbus	SO	Luongo	14,852	12–7–6	30	Recap
26	March 14	Nashville	4–7	Vancouver		Luongo	18,910	13–7–6	32	Recap
27	March 16	Detroit	5–2	Vancouver		Luongo	18,910	13–8–6	32	Recap
28	March 18	Minnesota	3–1	Vancouver		Luongo	18,910	13–9–6	32	Recap
29	March 19	St. Louis	2–3	Vancouver		Schneider	18,910	14–9–6	34	Recap
30	March 21	Vancouver	2–1	Phoenix		Schneider	17,220	15–9–6	36	Recap
31	March 23	Vancouver	1–0	Los Angeles		Schneider	18,118	16–9–6	38	Recap
32	March 24	Vancouver	3–2	Colorado		Schneider	15,194	17–9–6	40	Recap
33	March 26	Columbus	0–1	Vancouver	SO	Schneider	18,910	18–9–6	42	Recap
34	March 28	Colorado	1–4	Vancouver		Schneider	18,910	19–9–6	44	Recap
35	March 30	Vancouver	0–4	Edmonton		Schneider	16,839	19–10–6	44	Recap

April: 7–5–1 (home: 5–1–0; road: 2–4–1)
#	Date	Visitor	Score	Home	OT	Decision	Attendance	Record	Pts	Recap
36	April 1	Vancouver	2–3	San Jose		Schneider	17,562	19–11–6	44	Recap
37	April 4	Edmonton	0–4	Vancouver		Schneider	18,910	20–11–6	46	Recap
38	April 6	Calgary	2–5	Vancouver		Schneider	18,910	21–11–6	48	Recap
39	April 8	Phoenix	0–2	Vancouver		Schneider	18,910	22–11–6	50	Recap
40	April 10	Vancouver	4–1	Calgary		Luongo	19,289	23–11–6	52	Recap
41	April 13	Vancouver	3–4	Colorado		Schneider	15,229	23–12–6	52	Recap
42	April 15	Vancouver	5–2	Nashville		Luongo	16,518	24–12–6	54	Recap
43	April 16	Vancouver	1–2	St. Louis	SO	Schneider	17,709	24–12–7	55	Recap
44	April 18	Vancouver	1–5	Dallas		Schneider	16,571	24–13–7	55	Recap
45	April 20	Detroit	1–2	Vancouver	SO	Schneider	18,910	25–13–7	57	Recap
46	April 22	Chicago	1–3	Vancouver		Schneider	18,910	26–13–7	59	Recap
47	April 25	Anaheim	3–1	Vancouver		Luongo	18,910	26–14–7	59	Recap
48	April 27	Vancouver	2–7	Edmonton		Luongo	16,839	26–15–7	59	Recap

**Legend**: Win (2 points) Loss (0 points) Overtime/shootout loss (1 point)

=== Playoffs ===
2013 Stanley Cup playoffs

Western Conference Quarterfinals vs. (6) San Jose Sharks: San Jose won series 4–0
#	Date	Visitor	Score	Home	OT	Canucks Goals	Sharks Goals	Decision	Attendance	Series	Recap
1	May 1	San Jose	3–1	Vancouver		Bieksa	Couture, **Boyle**, Marleau	Luongo	18,910	0–1	G1
2	May 3	San Jose	3–2	Vancouver	OT	Kesler (2)	Thornton, Marleau, **Torres**	Luongo	18,910	0–2	G2
3	May 5	Vancouver	2–5	San Jose		Burrows, Hamhuis	Pavelski (2), **Couture** (2), Marleau	Schneider	17,562	0–3	G3
4	May 7	Vancouver	3–4	San Jose	OT	Raymond, Burrows, Edler	Burns, Pavelski (2), **Marleau**	Schneider	17,562	0–4	G4

Legend: = Win = Loss Bold = Player scored game-winning goal

=== Detailed records ===
**Western Conference**
Opponent	Home	Away	Total	Pts.	Goals scored	Goals allowed
**Central Division**
Chicago Blackhawks	2–0–0	0–0–1	2–0–1	5	8	6
Columbus Blue Jackets	1–0–0	1–0–1	2–0–1	5	4	3
Detroit Red Wings	1–1–0	0–1–0	1–2–0	2	7	14
Nashville Predators	1–0–0	2–0–0	3–0–0	6	13	6
St. Louis Blues	1–0–1	0–0–1	1–0–2	4	7	8
	**6–1–1**	**3–1–3**	**9–2–4**	**22**	**39**	**37**
**Northwest Division**
Calgary Flames	3–0–0	1–1–0	4–1–0	8	19	10
Colorado Avalanche	2–0–0	1–1–0	3–1–0	6	13	7
Edmonton Oilers	1–0–1	1–2–0	2–2–1	5	11	16
Minnesota Wild	1–1–0	1–1–0	2–2–0	4	9	9
**Vancouver Canucks**	–	–	–	–	–	–
	**7–1–1**	**4–5–0**	**11–6–1**	**23**	**52**	**42**
**Pacific Division**
Anaheim Ducks	0–2–0	1–0–0	1–2–0	2	9	10
Dallas Stars	0–1–0	1–1–0	1–2–0	2	8	12
Los Angeles Kings	1–0–0	1–0–1	2–0–1	5	8	5
Phoenix Coyotes	1–1–0	1–0–0	2–1–0	4	6	5
San Jose Sharks	0–0–1	0–2–0	0–2–1	1	5	10
	**2–4–1**	**4–3–1**	**6–7–2**	**14**	**36**	**42**

== Player statistics ==
=== Skaters ===
Regular season

Player	GP	G	A	Pts	+/−	PIM
Henrik Sedin	48	11	34	45	+19	24
Daniel Sedin	47	12	28	40	+12	18
Jannik Hansen	47	10	17	27	+12	8
Alex Burrows	47	13	11	24	+15	54
Dan Hamhuis	47	4	20	24	+9	12
Mason Raymond	46	10	12	22	+2	16
Alexander Edler	45	8	14	22	−5	37
Jason Garrison	47	8	8	16	+18	28
Chris Higgins	41	10	5	15	−4	10
Ryan Kesler	17	4	9	13	−5	12
Kevin Bieksa	36	6	6	12	+6	48
Zack Kassian	39	7	4	11	−7	51
Maxim Lapierre	48	4	6	10	−6	45
Jordan Schroeder	31	3	6	9	0	4
Christopher Tanev	38	2	5	7	+4	10
Derek Roy^{†}	12	3	3	6	+1	2
Dale Weise	40	3	3	6	−7	43
Andrew Ebbett	28	1	5	6	−1	4
David Booth	12	1	2	3	−3	4
Cam Barker	14	0	2	2	−3	4
Keith Ballard	36	0	2	2	−2	29
Aaron Volpatti^{‡}	16	1	0	1	0	28
Tom Sestito^{†}	23	1	0	1	−3	53
Andrew Alberts	24	0	1	1	−7	32
Bill Sweatt	1	0	0	0	−1	0
Nicklas Jensen	2	0	0	0	−1	0
Derek Joslin	2	0	0	0	−2	0
Frank Corrado	3	0	0	0	−1	0
Andrew Gordon	6	0	0	0	−1	0
Manny Malhotra	9	0	0	0	−3	0
Steve Pinizzotto	12	0	0	0	−6	29
Totals	48	122	203	325	+30	605

Playoffs

Player	GP	G	A	Pts	+/−	PIM
Alex Burrows	4	2	1	3	+1	6
Henrik Sedin	4	0	3	3	0	4
Daniel Sedin	4	0	3	3	−2	14
Ryan Kesler	4	2	0	2	−2	0
Mason Raymond	4	1	1	2	+2	0
Dan Hamhuis	4	1	1	2	0	8
Alexander Edler	4	1	0	1	−1	2
Kevin Bieksa	4	1	0	1	−1	8
Derek Roy	4	0	1	1	−1	2
Steve Pinizzotto	1	0	0	0	0	0
Tom Sestito	1	0	0	0	0	2
Andrew Ebbett	2	0	0	0	0	0
Jason Garrison	4	0	0	0	+1	2
Maxim Lapierre	4	0	0	0	+1	6
Jannik Hansen	4	0	0	0	0	2
Frank Corrado	4	0	0	0	−1	0
Zack Kassian	4	0	0	0	−1	4
Chris Higgins	4	0	0	0	−2	0
Andrew Alberts	4	0	0	0	−2	2
Dale Weise	4	0	0	0	−2	4
Totals	4	8	10	18	−10	66

=== Goaltenders ===
Regular season
Player	GP	GS	TOI	W	L	OT	GA	GAA	SA	SV%	SO	G	A	PIM
Cory Schneider	30	30	1,733:19	17	9	4	61	2.11	835	.927	5	0	1	0
Roberto Luongo	20	18	1,196:55	9	6	3	51	2.56	551	.907	2	0	0	0
Totals		48	2,930:14	26	15	7	112	2.29	1,386	.919	7	0	1	0

Playoffs
Player	GP	GS	TOI	W	L	GA	GAA	SA	SV%	SO	G	A	PIM
Roberto Luongo	3	2	139:41	0	2	6	2.58	71	.915	0	0	0	0
Cory Schneider	2	2	117:25	0	2	9	4.60	75	.880	0	0	0	0
Totals		4	257:06	0	4	15	3.50	146	.897	0	0	0	0

^{†}Traded to Canucks mid-season. Stats reflect time with Canucks only.
^{‡}Traded to another team mid-season. Stats reflect time with Canucks only.
Bold/italics denotes franchise record

== Awards and honours ==
=== Awards ===
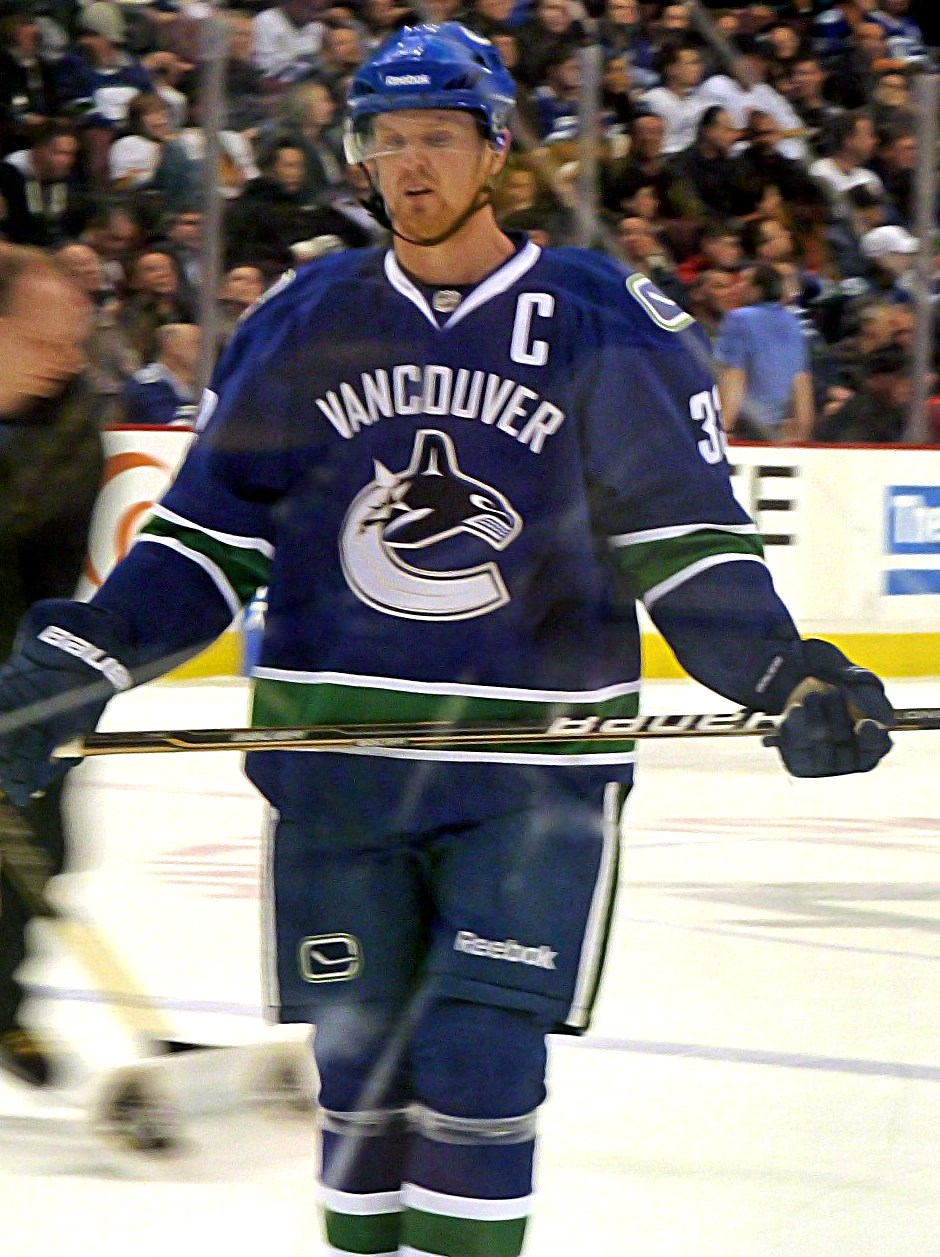
Henrik Sedin reached multiple milestones during the season including becoming the franchise's all-time leading scorer.

Player	Award
Team awards
Cory Schneider	Cyclone Taylor Trophy (Most Valuable Player)
Dan Hamhuis	Babe Pratt Trophy (Best Defenceman)
Jannik Hansen	Most Exciting Player Award
Jannik Hansen	Fred J. Hume Award (Unsung Hero)
Henrik Sedin	Cyrus H. McLean Trophy (Leading Scorer)

=== Milestones ===
Player	Milestone	Reached
Jordan Schroeder	1st NHL game	January 23, 2013
Jordan Schroeder	1st NHL point 1st NHL assist	January 25, 2013
Henrik Sedin	900th NHL game	February 1, 2013
Christopher Tanev	1st NHL goal	February 4, 2013
Jordan Schroeder	1st NHL goal	February 9, 2013
Alexander Edler	400th NHL game	February 17, 2013
Chris Higgins	500th NHL game	February 24, 2013
Henrik Sedin	600th consecutive NHL game	February 26, 2013
Dale Weise	100th NHL game	March 5, 2013
Steve Pinizzotto	1st NHL game	March 14, 2013
Nicklas Jensen	1st NHL game	April 1, 2013
Kevin Bieksa	200th NHL point	April 4, 2013
Henrik Sedin	600th NHL assist	April 6, 2013
Frank Corrado	1st NHL game	April 22, 2013

=== Records ===
Player	Record	Date
Henrik Sedin	Canucks All-Time Leading Scorer	February 15, 2013
Alex Burrows	Fastest Game-Opening Goal in Canucks History	March 16, 2013
Alain Vigneault	Most games coached in Canucks History	April 6, 2013

== Transactions ==
During the off-season, Vancouver signed defenceman Jason Garrison to a six-year contract worth $27.6 million. While the Canucks brought in Garrison, they lost longtime defenceman Sami Salo. The Canucks wanted to re-sign Salo, though they were unwilling to sign him to a two-year contract and offered only a one-year deal. Salo chose to leave and signed a two-year, $7.5 million contract with the Tampa Bay Lightning. It was believed that Garrison would step in and contribute to the power play and replace the departed Salo, who had performed a similar role. However, he struggled to adjust with his new team. He was taken off the power play unit and dropped to the third pairing within the first month. After the injuries to Bieksa, Garrison was moved from left defenceman to the right side pairing with Dan Hamhuis. The coaching staff came to consider this pairing to be the best and most trusted. Garrison finished the season with eight goals and eight assists, scoring three goals and three assists on the power play, and registering a +18 rating. His plus-minus was second on the team and led all defenceman.

=== Trades ===
Date	Details
April 2, 2013	To Dallas Stars: Kevin Connauton; 2nd-round pick in 2013	To Vancouver Canucks: Derek Roy

=== Free agents acquired ===
Player	Former team	Contract terms	Ref
Jason Garrison	Florida Panthers	6 years, $27.6 million	
Derek Joslin	Carolina Hurricanes	1 year, $700,000	
Patrick Mullen	Los Angeles Kings	1 year, $600,000	
Guillaume Desbiens	Calgary Flames	1 year, $600,000	
Cam Barker	Edmonton Oilers	1 year, $700,000	
Jim Vandermeer	San Jose Sharks	1 year, $600,000	
Kellan Lain	Lake Superior State University	3 years, entry-level	

=== Free agents lost ===
Player	New team	Contract terms	Ref
Samuel Pahlsson	Modo Hockey	3 years	
Sami Salo	Tampa Bay Lightning	2 years, $7.5 million	
Aaron Rome	Dallas Stars	3 years, $4.5 million	
Mark Mancari	Buffalo Sabres	1 year, $550,000	
Marc-Andre Gragnani	Carolina Hurricanes	1 year, $800,000	

=== Claimed via waivers ===
Player	Previous team	Date
Tom Sestito	Philadelphia Flyers	March 1, 2013

=== Lost via waivers ===
Player	New team	Date
Aaron Volpatti	Washington Capitals	February 28, 2013

=== Player signings ===
Player	Date	Contract terms	Ref
Aaron Volpatti	June 15, 2012	1 year, $600,000 contract extension	
Cory Schneider	June 29, 2012	3-year, $12 million contract extension	
Andrew Ebbett	July 2, 2012	1 year, $600,000 contract extension	
Steve Pinizzotto	July 2, 2012	1 year, $600,000 contract extension	
Mason Raymond	July 9, 2012	1 year, $2.275 million contract extension	
Dale Weise	July 25, 2012	1 year, $615,000 contract extension	
Alexandre Mallet	August 2, 2012	3-year $2.0525 million entry-level contract	
Brendan Gaunce	August 13, 2012	3-year, $3.0525 million entry-level contract	
Eddie Lack	August 27, 2012	2-year, $1.5 million contract extension	
Alex Burrows	September 14, 2012	4-year, $18 million contract extension	
Alexander Edler	January 18, 2013	6-year, $30 million contract extension	
Tom Sestito	May 29, 2013	2-year, $1.5 million contract extension	
Joacim Eriksson	June 17, 2013	2-year, $1.85 million entry-level contract	

== Draft picks ==
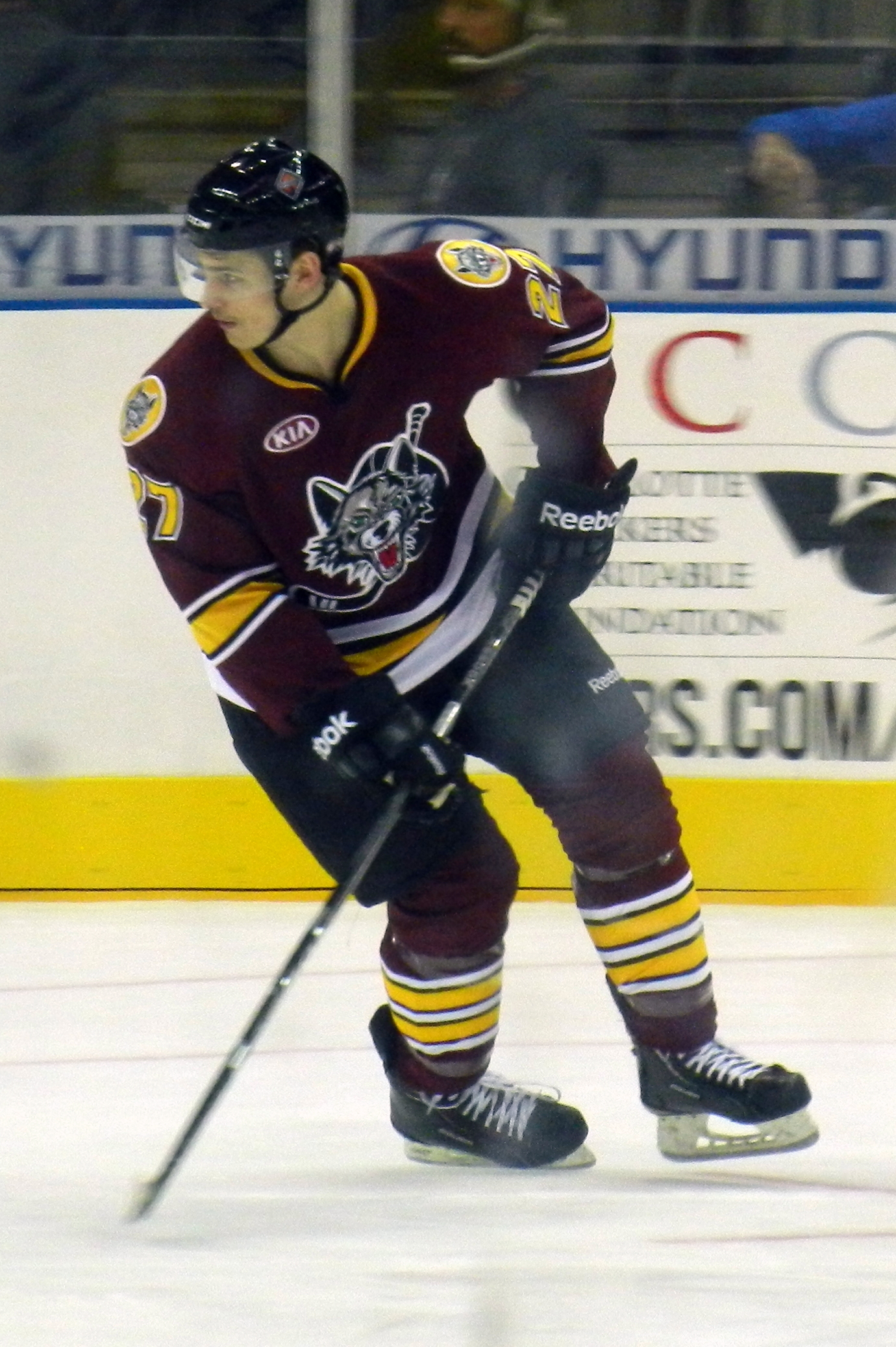
Alexandre Mallet was Vancouver's second round pick.

The 2012 NHL entry draft was held on June 22–23, 2012, at the Consol Energy Center in Pittsburgh, Pennsylvania. In the first round, the Canucks drafted Brendan Gaunce, a two-way centre with size. Leading up to the draft, Gaunce was ranked 13th among North American skaters by the NHL's scouting department, and was the top-ranked Canadian forward. Projected to be a mid-first-round pick, he dipped slightly to 26 where he was selected by the Canucks. general manager Mike Gillis stated that going into the draft, they had targeted Gaunce, and if he had not been available, Vancouver would have traded down to add extra picks.

With their second pick, the Canucks selected Alexandre Mallet, a gritty centreman who was passed over in his first year of draft eligibility. Mallet's section was the first in a series "late-bloomer" picks aimed at acquiring players who were either ready for the NHL or going to college. Fifth-round selection Ben Hutton was heading to the University of Maine. Sixth-round pick Wesley Myron, the first British Columbia native to be drafted by the Canucks in four years, was going to Boston University, while seventh-rounder Matthew Beattie would attend Yale University. In their yearly draft assessment, The Hockey News gave the Canucks a D grade for drafting Gaunce, whose stock was falling, as well as four players who had not been selected in prior drafts.

Round	#	Player	Pos	Nationality	College/junior/club team (league)
1	26	Brendan Gaunce	Centre	Canada	Belleville Bulls (OHL)
2	57	Alexandre Mallet	Left wing	Canada	Rimouski Oceanic (QMJHL)
5	147	Ben Hutton	Defenceman	Canada	Nepean Raiders (CCHL)
6	177	Wesley Myron	Left wing	Canada	Victoria Grizzlies (BCHL)
7	207	Matthew Beattie	Left wing	United States	Exeter High School (USHS-NH)

Draft notes

- Vancouver's third-round pick went to the Anaheim Ducks as the result of a February 28, 2011, trade that sent Maxim Lapierre and MacGregor Sharp to the Canucks in exchange for Joel Perrault and this pick.
- Vancouver's fourth-round pick went to the Columbus Blue Jackets as the result of a February 27, 2012, trade that sent Samuel Pahlsson to the Canucks in exchange for Taylor Ellington, a 2012 fourth-round pick (from the New York Islanders) and this pick.

== Farm team ==
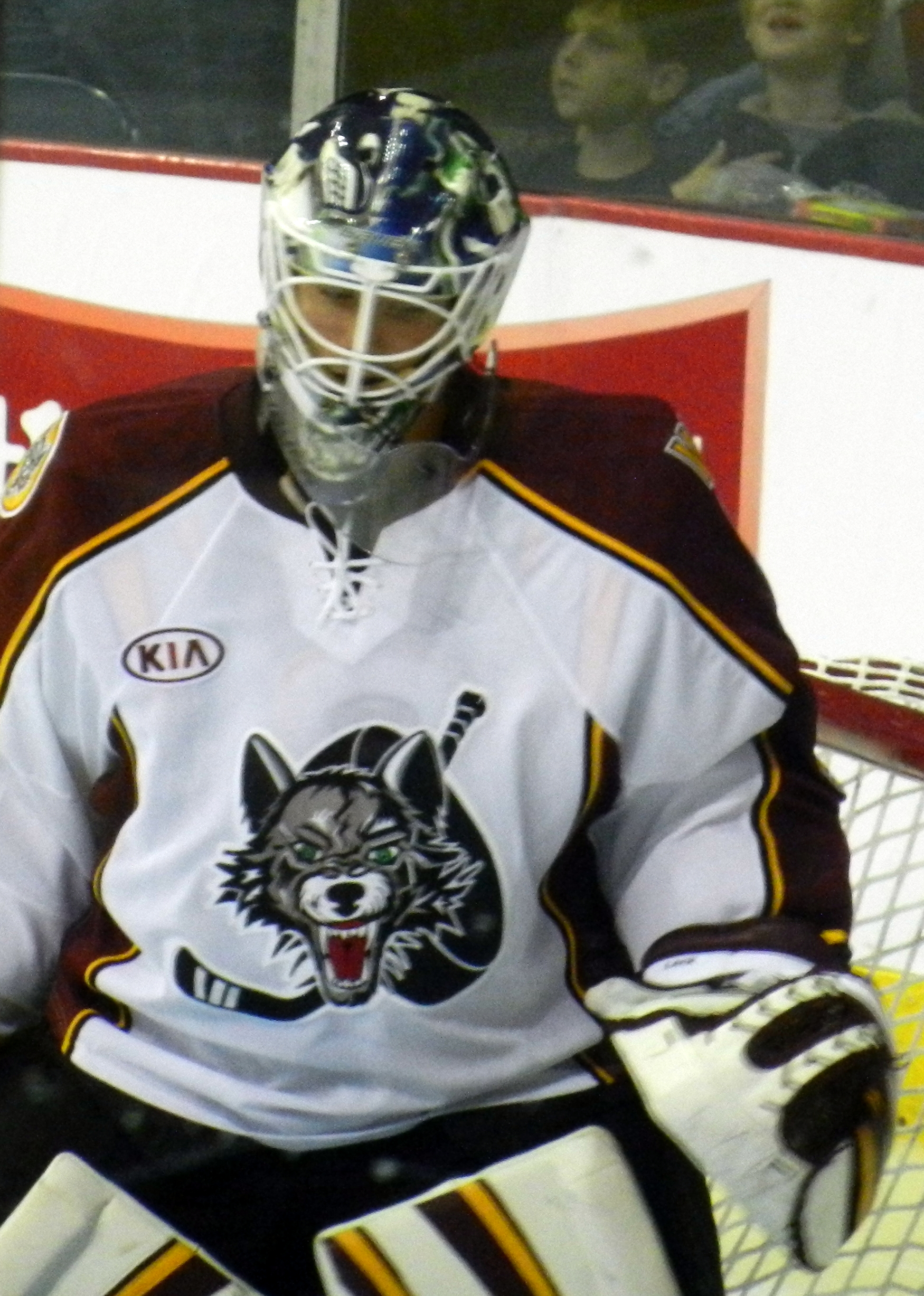
Eddie Lack suffered a season ending hip injury while playing for the Chicago Wolves.

The Canucks completed their second season with the Chicago Wolves as American Hockey League affiliate, the final one under the two teams' contract. The Wolves started the season by winning their first four games for the second time in franchise history. The following games were not as fruitful as they lost five of their next six games and their starting goaltender Eddie Lack suffered a hip injury. The injury required surgery, and Lack missed the remainder of the season. With Lack out the Wolves finished fifteenth in the league for fewest goals allowed. The previous season they allowed the fifth fewest goals in the league. Lack and back-up Matt Climie set a franchise record for lowest team goals against average. With the league's nineteenth best offense, the Wolves were unable to overcome the goals against them and finished fourth in their division. Thus missing the playoffs. It was the second time in three years that the Wolves missed the playoffs, but only the fourth time in franchise history. Despite missing the playoffs, Chicago finished second in league attendance.

Late in the season, reports began to surface that the Canucks would be purchasing their own AHL team and relocating it. Vancouver wanted to have more control over personnel decisions for their farm team and bought the Peoria Rivermen. The Canucks had originally hoped to move the franchise to nearby Abbotsford, British Columbia, which was home of the Calgary Flames AHL affiliate the Abbotsford Heat. Calgary indicated they would be willing to move their franchise, but a deal between the Canucks and the city of Abbotsford was unable to be reached. With the Abbotsford deal not working out, the Canucks set out to find a new home for their affiliate. They considered moving the team to Vancouver and sharing Rogers Arena, but the city was within the 50-mile territorial radius provided by the AHL. They next considered moving the team to Seattle, Washington, but were not allowed by the NHL. Seattle was a candidate to land the Phoenix Coyotes if a lease agreement could not be reached with the city of Glendale. Eventually, the Canucks decided to relocate their franchise to Utica, New York, creating the Comets.

== Notes ==
1: The NHL uses a point system for their standings that awards two points for a win and one point an overtime or shootout loss. The denotation of a team's record is wins-losses-overtime/shootout losses.
