= 2012–13 Columbus Blue Jackets season =

National Hockey League season

2012–13 Columbus Blue Jackets
- Division: 4th Central
- Conference: 9th Western
- 2012–13 record: 24–17–7
- Home record: 14–5–5
- Road record: 10–12–2
- Goals for: 120
- Goals against: 119

Team information
- General manager: Scott Howson (Oct.–Feb.); Jarmo Kekäläinen (Feb.–Apr.)
- Coach: Todd Richards
- Captain: Vacant
- Alternate captains: Adrian Aucoin; Brandon Dubinsky; Jack Johnson
- Arena: Nationwide Arena
- Average attendance: 14,564 (80.3%) (24 games)

Team leaders
- Goals: Mark Letestu (13)
- Assists: Vaclav Prospal (18)
- Points: Vaclav Prospal (30)
- Penalty minutes: Jared Boll (100)
- Plus/minus: Dalton Prout (+15)
- Wins: Sergei Bobrovsky (21)
- Goals against average: Sergei Bobrovsky (2.00)

The 2012–13 Columbus Blue Jackets season was the 13th season for the National Hockey League (NHL) franchise that was established on June 25, 1997. The regular season was reduced from its usual 82 games to 48 due to a lockout.

Despite a big improvement, the Blue Jackets failed to qualify for the Stanley Cup playoffs, missing the playoffs for the fourth year in a row for the first time since the 2003–04 season and the 2007–08 season by one point as a result of the tie-breaker disadvantage with the Minnesota Wild.

== Regular season ==
On February 12, 2013, the Blue Jackets fired general manager Scott Howson after years of disappointing hockey in Columbus. On February 13, Jarmo Kekäläinen was hired as his replacement. With his hiring, Kekäläinen became the first European general manager in NHL history. The team picked up steam after the change at general manager, going 20–10–5 to end the season just narrowly missing out on a playoff spot.

=== Standings ===
Central Division
Pos	Team	GP	W	L	OTL	ROW	GF	GA	GD	Pts
1	p – Chicago Blackhawks	48	36	7	5	30	155	102	+53	77
2	x – St. Louis Blues	48	29	17	2	24	129	115	+14	60
3	x – Detroit Red Wings	48	24	16	8	22	124	115	+9	56
4	Columbus Blue Jackets	48	24	17	7	19	120	119	+1	55
5	Nashville Predators	48	16	23	9	14	111	139	−28	41

Source: National Hockey League
p – Clinched Presidents' Trophy; x – Clinched playoff spot

Western Conference
Pos	Div	Team	GP	W	L	OTL	ROW	GF	GA	GD	Pts
1	CE	p – Chicago Blackhawks	48	36	7	5	30	155	102	+53	77
2	PA	y – Anaheim Ducks	48	30	12	6	24	140	118	+22	66
3	NW	y – Vancouver Canucks	48	26	15	7	21	127	121	+6	59
4	CE	x – St. Louis Blues	48	29	17	2	24	129	115	+14	60
5	PA	x – Los Angeles Kings	48	27	16	5	25	133	118	+15	59
6	PA	x – San Jose Sharks	48	25	16	7	17	124	116	+8	57
7	CE	x – Detroit Red Wings	48	24	16	8	22	124	115	+9	56
8	NW	x – Minnesota Wild	48	26	19	3	22	122	127	−5	55
9	CE	Columbus Blue Jackets	48	24	17	7	19	120	119	+1	55
10	PA	Phoenix Coyotes	48	21	18	9	17	125	131	−6	51
11	PA	Dallas Stars	48	22	22	4	20	130	142	−12	48
12	NW	Edmonton Oilers	48	19	22	7	17	125	134	−9	45
13	NW	Calgary Flames	48	19	25	4	19	128	160	−32	42
14	CE	Nashville Predators	48	16	23	9	14	111	139	−28	41
15	NW	Colorado Avalanche	48	16	25	7	14	116	152	−36	39

Source: National Hockey League
p – Clinched Presidents' Trophy; x – Clinched playoff spot; y – Clinched division

=== Schedule and results ===
2012–13 game log

January: 2–5–1 (home: 1–2–1; road: 1–3–0)
#	Date	Visitor	Score	Home	OT	Decision	Attendance	Record	Pts	Recap
1	January 19	Columbus Blue Jackets	3–2	Nashville Predators	SO	Bobrovsky	17,113	1–0–0	2	Recap
2	January 21	Detroit Red Wings	4–3	Columbus Blue Jackets	SO	Bobrovsky	19,206	1–0–1	3	Recap
3	January 23	Columbus Blue Jackets	1–5	Phoenix Coyotes	—	Mason	8,355	1–1–1	3	Recap
4	January 24	Columbus Blue Jackets	0–4	Colorado Avalanche	—	Bobrovsky	14,235	1–2–1	3	Recap
5	January 26	Chicago Blackhawks	4–2	Columbus Blue Jackets	—	Mason	18,381	1–3–1	3	Recap
6	January 28	Dallas Stars	1–2	Columbus Blue Jackets	—	Bobrovsky	10,475	2–3–1	5	Recap
7	January 29	Columbus Blue Jackets	2–3	Minnesota Wild	—	Mason	17,584	2–4–1	5	Recap
8	January 31	St. Louis Blues	4–1	Columbus Blue Jackets	—	Bobrovsky	11,155	2–5–1	5	Recap

February: 3–7–2 (home: 2–2–2; road: 1–5–0)
#	Date	Visitor	Score	Home	OT	Decision	Attendance	Record	Pts	Recap
9	February 2	Detroit Red Wings	2–4	Columbus Blue Jackets	—	Mason	17,612	3–5–1	7	Recap
10	February 5	Los Angeles Kings	4–2	Columbus Blue Jackets	—	Mason	11,019	3–6–1	7	Recap
11	February 7	Calgary Flames	4–3	Columbus Blue Jackets	OT	Bobrovsky	10,484	3–6–2	8	Recap
12	February 10	Edmonton Oilers	3–1	Columbus Blue Jackets	—	Bobrovsky	14,364	3–7–2	8	Recap
13	February 11	San Jose Sharks	2–6	Columbus Blue Jackets	—	Mason	10,837	4–7–2	10	Recap
14	February 15	Columbus Blue Jackets	1–2	Los Angeles Kings	—	Bobrovsky	18,118	4–8–2	10	Recap
15	February 16	Columbus Blue Jackets	3–5	Phoenix Coyotes	—	Mason	15,425	4–9–2	10	Recap
16	February 18	Columbus Blue Jackets	2–3	Anaheim Ducks	—	Bobrovsky	14,713	4–10–2	10	Recap
17	February 21	Columbus Blue Jackets	3–2	Detroit Red Wings	—	Bobrovsky	20,066	5–10–2	12	Recap
18	February 23	Columbus Blue Jackets	1–2	St. Louis Blues	—	Bobrovsky	19,457	5–11–2	12	Recap
19	February 24	Columbus Blue Jackets	0–1	Chicago Blackhawks	—	Mason	21,580	5–12–2	12	Recap
20	February 26	Dallas Stars	5–4	Columbus Blue Jackets	OT	Bobrovsky	11,523	5–12–3	13	Recap

March: 10–2–4 (home: 8–0–2; road: 2–2–2)
#	Date	Visitor	Score	Home	OT	Decision	Attendance	Record	Pts	Recap
21	March 1	Columbus Blue Jackets	3–4	Chicago Blackhawks	OT	Mason	21,828	5–12–4	14	Recap
22	March 3	Colorado Avalanche	1–2	Columbus Blue Jackets	OT	Bobrovsky	13,778	6–12–4	16	Recap
23	March 5	Edmonton Oilers	3–4	Columbus Blue Jackets	SO	Bobrovsky	14,952	7–12–4	18	Recap
24	March 7	Vancouver Canucks	1–2	Columbus Blue Jackets	OT	Bobrovsky	13,632	8–12–4	20	Recap
25	March 9	Detroit Red Wings	0–3	Columbus Blue Jackets	—	Bobrovsky	17,957	9–12–4	22	Recap
26	March 10	Columbus Blue Jackets	3–2	Detroit Red Wings	SO	Bobrovsky	20,066	10–12–4	24	Recap
27	March 12	Vancouver Canucks	2–1	Columbus Blue Jackets	SO	Bobrovsky	14,852	10–12–5	25	Recap
28	March 14	Chicago Blackhawks	2–1	Columbus Blue Jackets	SO	Bobrovsky	15,009	10–12–6	26	Recap
29	March 16	Phoenix Coyotes	0–1	Columbus Blue Jackets	SO	Bobrovsky	14,231	11–12–6	28	Recap
30	March 19	Nashville Predators	3–4	Columbus Blue Jackets	—	Bobrovsky	13,364	12–12–6	30	Recap
31	March 22	Calgary Flames	1–5	Columbus Blue Jackets	—	Bobrovsky	13,853	13–12–6	32	Recap
32	March 23	Columbus Blue Jackets	2–5	Nashville Predators	—	Bobrovsky	17,113	13–13–6	32	Recap
33	March 26	Columbus Blue Jackets	0–1	Vancouver Canucks	SO	Bobrovsky	18,910	13–13–7	33	Recap
34	March 28	Columbus Blue Jackets	4–6	Edmonton Oilers	—	Bobrovsky	16,839	13–14–7	33	Recap
35	March 29	Columbus Blue Jackets	6–4	Calgary Flames	—	Mason	19,289	14–14–7	35	Recap
36	March 31	Anaheim Ducks	1–2	Columbus Blue Jackets	OT	Bobrovsky	13,185	15–14–7	37	Recap

April: 9–3–0 (home: 3–1–0; road: 6–2–0)
#	Date	Visitor	Score	Home	OT	Decision	Attendance	Record	Pts	Recap
37	April 4	Columbus Blue Jackets	3–1	Nashville Predators	—	Bobrovsky	17,113	16–14–7	39	Recap
38	April 5	Columbus Blue Jackets	1–3	St. Louis Blues	—	Bobrovsky	19,224	16–15–7	39	Recap
39	April 7	Minnesota Wild	3–0	Columbus Blue Jackets	—	Bobrovsky	15,909	16–16–7	39	Recap
40	April 9	San Jose Sharks	0–4	Columbus Blue Jackets	—	Bobrovsky	17,771	17–16–7	41	Recap
41	April 12	St. Louis Blues	1–4	Columbus Blue Jackets	—	Bobrovsky	17,007	18–16–7	43	Recap
42	April 13	Columbus Blue Jackets	3–2	Minnesota Wild	SO	Bobrovsky	19,187	19–16–7	45	Recap
43	April 15	Columbus Blue Jackets	4–3	Colorado Avalanche	OT	Bobrovsky	13,694	20–16–7	47	Recap
44	April 17	Columbus Blue Jackets	3–2	Anaheim Ducks	OT	Bobrovsky	15,074	21–16–7	49	Recap
45	April 18	Columbus Blue Jackets	1–2	Los Angeles Kings	—	Bobrovsky	18,118	21–17–7	49	Recap
46	April 21	Columbus Blue Jackets	4–3	San Jose Sharks	—	Bobrovsky	17,562	22–17–7	51	Recap
47	April 25	Columbus Blue Jackets	3–1	Dallas Stars	—	Bobrovsky	16,918	23–17–7	53	Recap
48	April 27	Nashville Predators	1–3	Columbus Blue Jackets	—	Bobrovsky	19,002	24–17–7	55	Recap

Legend: = Win = Loss = OT/SO Loss

== Player statistics ==
Final stats

Skaters

Regular season
Player	GP	G	A	Pts	+/-	PIM
Vaclav Prospal	48	12	18	30	3	32
Mark Letestu	46	13	14	27	7	10
Fedor Tyutin	48	4	18	22	9	28
Brandon Dubinsky	29	2	18	20	2	76
Jack Johnson	44	5	14	19	−5	12
Nick Foligno	45	6	13	19	6	28
R. J. Umberger	48	8	10	18	3	16
Artem Anisimov	35	11	7	18	−6	12
Cam Atkinson	35	9	9	18	9	4
Derick Brassard^{‡}	34	7	11	18	−2	16
Matt Calvert	42	9	7	16	−9	32
James Wisniewski	30	5	9	14	−1	15
Ryan Johansen	40	5	7	12	−7	12
Nikita Nikitin	38	3	6	9	2	17
Derek Dorsett^{‡}	24	3	6	9	−11	53
Derek MacKenzie	43	3	5	8	1	36
Marian Gaborik^{†}	12	3	5	8	5	6
Dalton Prout	28	1	6	7	15	25
Jared Boll	43	2	4	6	1	100
Blake Comeau^{†}	9	2	3	5	5	6
Tim Erixon	31	0	5	5	4	14
Adrian Aucoin	36	0	4	4	−8	16
Colton Gillies	27	1	1	2	1	17
Cody Goloubef	11	1	0	1	−3	0
John Moore^{‡}	17	0	1	1	−5	2
Nick Drazenovic	8	0	0	0	−2	4
Nick Holden	2	0	0	0	1	0
Sean Collins	5	0	0	0	−2	6
David Savard	4	0	0	0	−3	0
Jonathan Audy-Marchessault	2	0	0	0	−1	0
Totals		115	201	316	9	595

Goaltenders

Regular season
Player	GP	GS	TOI	W	L	OT	GA	GAA	SA	SV%	SO	G	A	PIM
Sergei Bobrovsky	38	37	2218:57	21	11	6	74	2.00	1084	0.932	4	0	0	0
Steve Mason^{‡}	13	11	712:05	3	6	1	35	2.95	346	0.899	0	0	0	0
Totals		48	2931:02	24	17	7	109	2.23	1430	0.924	4	0	0	0

^{†}Denotes player spent time with another team before joining the Blue Jackets. Stats reflect time with the Blue Jackets only.
^{‡}Traded mid-season
Bold/italics denotes franchise record

== Awards and records ==
=== Awards ===
Regular season
Player	Award	Awarded
Sergei Bobrovsky	Vezina Trophy	June 15, 2013

== Transactions ==
The Blue Jackets have been involved in the following transactions during the 2012–13 season.

=== Trades ===
June 22, 2012	To Philadelphia Flyers 2nd-round pick in 2012; 4th-round pick in 2012; 4th-round pick in 2013	To Columbus Blue Jackets Sergei Bobrovsky
July 1, 2012	To Ottawa Senators Marc Methot	To Columbus Blue Jackets Nick Foligno
July 23, 2012	To New York Rangers Rick Nash; Steven Delisle; Conditional 3rd-round pick in 2013 (Note: Condition satisfied.)	To Columbus Blue Jackets Artem Anisimov; Brandon Dubinsky; Tim Erixon; 1st-round pick in 2013
March 10, 2013	To Winnipeg Jets Tomas Kubalik	To Columbus Blue Jackets Spencer Machacek
March 12, 2013	To Philadelphia Flyers Future considerations	To Columbus Blue Jackets Matthew Ford
April 3, 2013	To New York Rangers Derick Brassard; Derek Dorsett; John Moore; 6th-round pick in 2014	To Columbus Blue Jackets Marian Gaborik; Steven Delisle; Blake Parlett
April 3, 2013	To Philadelphia Flyers Steve Mason	To Columbus Blue Jackets Michael Leighton; 3rd-round pick in 2015
April 3, 2013	To Calgary Flames 5th-round pick in 2013	To Columbus Blue Jackets Blake Comeau
April 3, 2013	To Pittsburgh Penguins Future considerations	To Columbus Blue Jackets Patrick Killeen

=== Free agents signed ===
Player	Former team	Contract terms
Jonathan Audy-Marchessault	Connecticut Whale	3 years, $2.775 million entry-level contract
Adrian Aucoin	Phoenix Coyotes	1 year, $2 million
Ilari Melart	HIFK	1 year, $925,000 entry-level contract

=== Free agents lost ===
Player	New team	Contract terms
Alexandre Giroux	Dynamo Riga	2 years
Curtis Sanford	Lokomotiv Yaroslavl	undisclosed
Dane Byers	Edmonton Oilers	1 year, $560,000
Mark Dekanich	Winnipeg Jets	1 year, $600,000
Aaron Johnson	Boston Bruins	1 year, $650,000
Radek Martinek	New York Islanders	1 year, $750,000

=== Claimed via waivers ===
Player	Former team	Date claimed off waivers

=== Lost via waivers ===
Player	New team	Date claimed off waivers

=== Lost via retirement ===
Player

=== Player signings ===
Player	Date	Contract terms
Cody Bass	April 9, 2012	1 year, $700,000
Jake Hansen	April 12, 2012	Two-year, entry-level contract
Michael Chaput	April 28, 2012	Three-year, entry-level contract
Nikita Nikitin	June 28, 2012	2 years, $4.3 million
Jared Boll	June 30, 2012	2 years, $2.1 million
Nick Holden	June 30, 2012	1 year, $550,000
Curtis McElhinney	July 1, 2012	1 year, $750,000
Nick Foligno	July 5, 2012	3 years, $9.15 million
Ryan Murray	July 25, 2012	3 years, $2.775 million entry-level contract
Mark Letestu	April 2, 2013	2 years, $2.5 million contract extension
Lukas Sedlak	April 10, 2013	3 years, $1.84 million entry-level contract
Matt Calvert	April 23, 2013	2 years, $1.975 million contract extension
Cam Atkinson	April 26, 2013	2 years, $2.3 million contract extension
Curtis McElhinney	May 24, 2013	1 year, $600,000
Anton Forsberg	May 28, 2013	3 years, $1.965 million entry-level contract
Artem Anisimov	June 26, 2013	3 years, $9.85 million

== 2012 Draft picks ==
Columbus' picks at the 2012 NHL entry draft in Pittsburgh, Pennsylvania.

Round	#	Player	Pos	Nationality	College/Junior/Club team (League)
1	2	Ryan Murray	D	Canada	Everett Silvertips (WHL)
2	31	Oscar Dansk	G	Sweden	Brynas IF (Elitserien)
3	62	Joonas Korpisalo	G	Finland	Jokerit U20 (Jr. A SM-liiga)
4	95^{[b]}	Josh Anderson	RW	Canada	London Knights (OHL)
6	152	Daniel Zaar	RW	Sweden	Rogle BK Jr. (J20 SuperElit)
7	182	Gianluca Curcuruto	D	Canada	Sault Ste. Marie Greyhounds (OHL)

Draft notes

Pick 30 – Los Angeles will send its first-round pick in the 2012 or 2013 NHL Draft to Columbus, at Columbus' option.

- The Blue Jackets' fourth-round pick went to the Pittsburgh Penguins as the result of a November 8, 2011, trade that sent Mark Letestu to the Blue Jackets in exchange for this pick.
- ^{b} The Vancouver Canucks fourth-round pick went to the Columbus Blue Jackets as a result of a February 27, 2012, trade that sent Samuel Pahlsson to the Canucks in exchange for this pick.
- The Blue Jackets' fifth-round pick went to the Montreal Canadiens as the result of a June 29, 2011, trade that sent James Wisniewski to the Blue Jackets in exchange for this conditional pick (fifth round if Blue Jackets re-sign Wisniewski, else seventh round).

== See also ==
- 2012–13 NHL season
