= Tomáš Vincour =

Czech professional ice hockey player (born 1990)

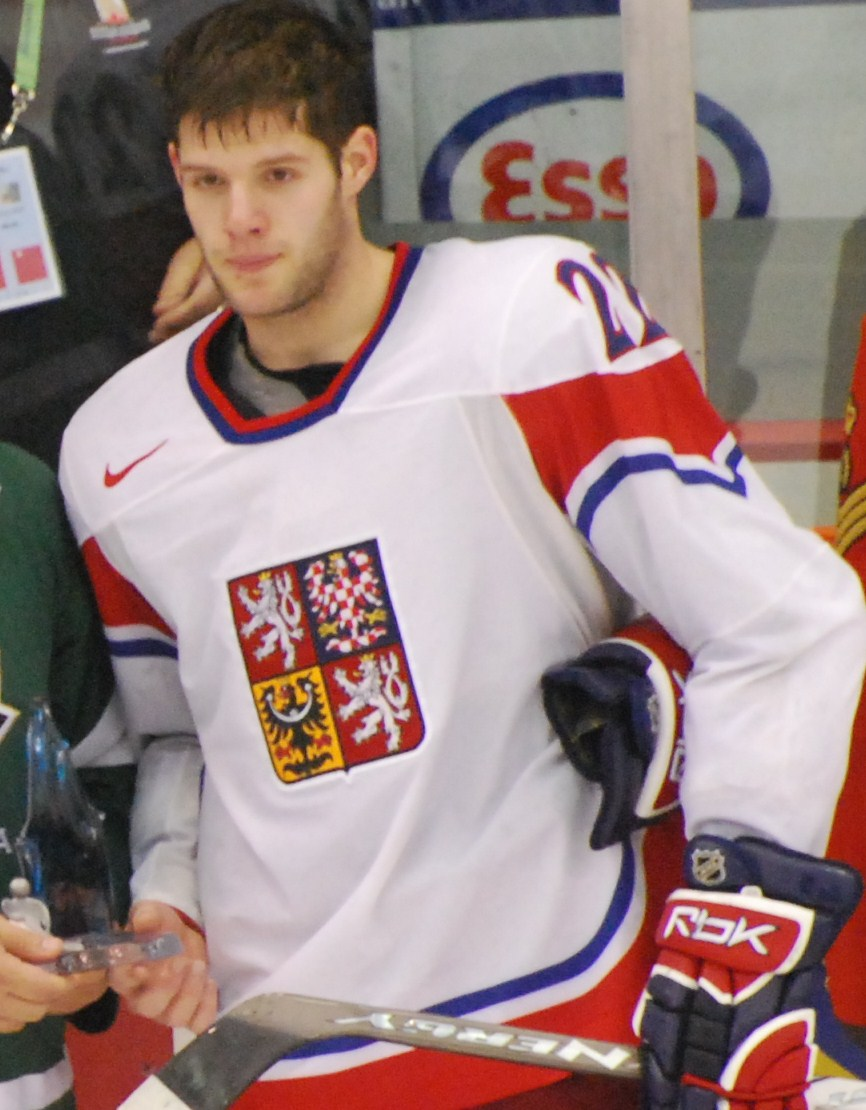
- Born: November 19, 1990 (age 35) Brno, Czechoslovakia
- Height: 6 ft 2 in (188 cm)
- Weight: 205 lb (93 kg; 14 st 9 lb)
- Position: Right wing
- Shot: Right
- Played for: HC Kometa Brno; Dallas Stars; Colorado Avalanche; Ak Bars Kazan; HC Sibir Novosibirsk; Mountfield HK
- NHL draft: 129th overall, 2009; Dallas Stars
- Playing career: 2006–2024

Tomáš Vincour (Czech pronunciation: [ˈtomaːʃ ˈvɪntsour]; born November 19, 1990) is a Czech former professional ice hockey player who played in the National Hockey League for the Dallas Stars, who selected him in the fifth round of the 2009 NHL entry draft, and the Colorado Avalanche.

== Playing career ==
He was selected by the Dallas Stars in the 5th round (129th overall) of the 2009 NHL entry draft and was the first ever Oil King to be drafted by an NHL team. Vincour graduated at Salisbury Composite High School in Sherwood Park, Alberta. Previously to starting his major junior career in North America, Vincour played four games with HC Kometa Brno as a youth in the 1. národní hokejová liga during the 2006–07 season.

Vincour made his NHL debut with the Dallas Stars during the 2010–11 season on February 9, 2011. He became the first alumnus of the modern incarnation Edmonton Oil Kings to play in the NHL. Vincour scored his first NHL goal on March 9, 2011, in a game against the Calgary Flames' Miikka Kiprusoff. He was assisted by Toby Petersen and Jeff Woywitka.

During the lockout shortened 2012–13 season, Vincour was traded by the Stars to the Colorado Avalanche in exchange for Cameron Gaunce on April 2, 2013. Reassigned to Avalanche affiliate, the Lake Erie Monsters, Vincour immediately made an offensive impact to lead all Monsters in scoring post trade with 11 points in 6 games. Upon the conclusion of Lake Erie's season, he was recalled to make his Avalanche debut in a defeat against the St. Louis Blues on April 23, 2013.

As a restricted free agent of the Avalanche at season's end, Vincour opted to sign a one-year contract in Russia with Ak Bars Kazan of the Kontinental Hockey League on June 18, 2013. In the 2013–14 season, Vincour secured a role in the third line for Kazan. He contributed with 6 goals in 11 points in 39 games before leaving Kazan at season's end to return to his original Czech club, after 7 seasons abroad, with HC Kometa Brno on August 14, 2014.

Vincour's tenure with the Comets was short lived, as on August 29, 2014, Vincour activated his NHL out-clause after he was unexpectedly contacted and offered a contract by the Avalanche to return to North America for the 2014–15 season. Vincour suffered an early injury and was reassigned to the Lake Erie Monsters to begin his 2014–15 season. He was recalled to the Avalanche and played in 7 games for 1 assist before he was returned to finish the year with the Monsters.

On August 18, 2015, as a free agent from the Avalanche, Vincour returned to the KHL, signing a one-year contract with HC Sibir Novosibirsk. In the 2015–16 season, Vincour set new KHL marks in recording 27 points in 45 games. As a free agent at the conclusion of the season, Vincour opted to return hometown club, HC Kometa Brno of the Czech ELH on August 5, 2016.

After two seasons with Brno, capturing the Czech Championship in each campaign, Vincour left the club as a free agent and signed a two-year contract to remain in the ELH with Mountfield HK on July 13, 2018.

In returning to Kometa Brno, Vincour played out the remainder of his professional career in the ELH, announcing his retirement following the 2023–24 season, on 8 April 2024. He would remain within Kometa Brno, transitioning into a scouting capacity of the hockey operations.

== International play ==
Vincour debuted for the Czech Republic in a game against Slovakia. This game took place in Bratislava (Slovakia) and the Czech Republic's team won after a penalty shoot out. Vincour assisted on Holík's equalizer.

== Career statistics ==
=== Regular season and playoffs ===
			Regular season					Playoffs
Season	Team	League	GP	G	A	Pts	PIM	GP	G	A	Pts	PIM
2005–06	HC Kometa Brno	CZE.1	1	0	0	0	0	—	—	—	—	—
2006–07	HC Kometa Brno	CZE.1	4	0	1	1	0	—	—	—	—	—
2007–08	Edmonton Oil Kings	WHL	65	16	23	39	36	—	—	—	—	—
2008–09	Edmonton Oil Kings	WHL	49	17	19	36	23	—	—	—	—	—
2009–10	Edmonton Oil Kings	WHL	33	17	9	26	31	—	—	—	—	—
2009–10	Vancouver Giants	WHL	24	12	10	22	17	15	7	6	13	8
2010–11	Texas Stars	AHL	44	5	7	12	10	6	0	1	1	4
2010–11	Dallas Stars	NHL	24	1	1	2	4	—	—	—	—	—
2011–12	Dallas Stars	NHL	47	4	6	10	2	—	—	—	—	—
2011–12	Texas Stars	AHL	22	12	4	16	8	—	—	—	—	—
2012–13	Texas Stars	AHL	47	13	15	28	20	—	—	—	—	—
2012–13	Dallas Stars	NHL	15	2	1	3	2	—	—	—	—	—
2012–13	Lake Erie Monsters	AHL	6	5	6	11	2	—	—	—	—	—
2012–13	Colorado Avalanche	NHL	2	0	1	1	2	—	—	—	—	—
2013–14	Ak Bars Kazan	KHL	39	6	5	11	12	3	0	2	2	0
2014–15	Lake Erie Monsters	AHL	38	10	13	23	10	—	—	—	—	—
2014–15	Colorado Avalanche	NHL	7	0	1	1	2	—	—	—	—	—
2015–16	HC Sibir Novosibirsk	KHL	45	10	17	27	46	10	1	3	4	6
2016–17	HC Kometa Brno	ELH	39	9	13	22	26	7	0	3	3	14
2017–18	HC Kometa Brno	ELH	39	10	10	20	22	12	4	2	6	2
2018–19	Mountfield HK	ELH	44	21	10	31	16	4	1	0	1	4
2019–20	Mountfield HK	ELH	20	3	2	5	6	—	—	—	—	—
2019–20	HC Kometa Brno	ELH	20	6	7	13	6	—	—	—	—	—
2020–21	HC Kometa Brno	ELH	39	6	6	12	4	8	0	1	1	2
2021–22	HC Kometa Brno	ELH	47	10	10	20	16	5	1	0	1	2
2022–23	HC Kometa Brno	ELH	33	3	7	10	2	7	0	2	2	0
2023–24	HC Kometa Brno	ELH	34	8	5	13	16	6	0	1	1	2
NHL totals			95	7	10	17	12	—	—	—	—	—
KHL totals			84	16	22	38	58	13	1	5	6	6
ELH totals			315	76	70	146	114	49	6	9	15	26

=== International ===
Year	Team	Event	Result	GP	G	A	Pts	PIM
2007	Czech Republic	U17	5th	9	1	5	6	12
2008	Czech Republic	U18-D1	1st place, gold medalist(s)	5	2	11	13	2
2009	Czech Republic	WJC	6th	6	0	3	3	2
2010	Czech Republic	WJC	7th	5	0	4	4	2
Junior totals				25	3	23	26	18
