= 2007–08 Boston College Eagles men's ice hockey season =

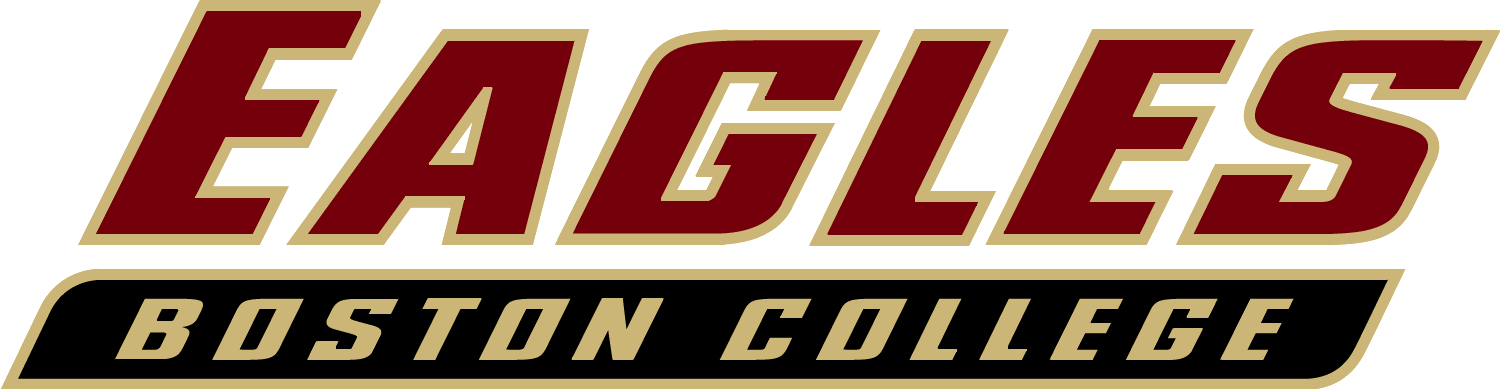

NCAA Division I National champion Beanpot, champion Hockey East Tournament, champion NCAA tournament, Champion
- Conference: 4th Hockey East
- Home ice: Conte Forum

Rankings
- USA Today: #1
- USCHO.com: #7

Record
- Overall: 25–11–8
- Conference: 11–9–7
- Home: 6–7–4
- Road: 8–3–4
- Neutral: 11–1–0

Coaches and captains
- Head coach: Jerry York
- Assistant coaches: Mike Cavanaugh; Greg Brown; Jim Logue
- Captain: Michael Brennan
- Alternate captain(s): Dan Betram, Matt Greene

The 2007–08 Boston College Eagles men's ice hockey season was the 86th season of play for the program and 24th in the Hockey East. They represented Boston College in the 2007–08 NCAA Division I men's ice hockey season. They were coached by Jerry York, in his 14th season and played their home games at the Conte Forum. The team won the 2008 NCAA Division I men's ice hockey tournament, the 3rd title in program history.

== Season ==
After losing the national championship in the final minutes a year before, Boston College entered the year with some uncertainty. 3-year starter, Cory Schneider forwent his senior season by signing a professional contract and BC would have to rely on three underclassmen to absorb the minutes. The Eagles saw the entire defensive corps return. However, up front the team lost their leading scorer from the year before, Brian Boyle, but they still returned most of the principle offense.

=== Injury and suspensions ===
With all the elements for a solid season, the Eagles were ranked high in the preseason polls. While they kicked off the year with an overtime loss to Michigan, much worse was to come in the aftermath. Brock Bradford, one of the team's leading point producers from last year, suffered a broken arm and would be out for months. Compounding their problems, Brett Motherwell and Brian O'Hanley, two of the leaders on defense, were given indefinite suspensions by head coach Jerry York. While the team was mum on the entire reason behind the suspensions, other than saying that the two had missed curfew, York indicated in November that neither would be back with the team 'any time soon'. As a result, both players ended up leaving the team and signing professional contracts during the year. The Eagles also lost a 4th player early in the year when freshman Ryan Hayes departed after just 6 games.

In the meantime, BC had to struggle through the early part of the season without three of its expected regulars. York had to shuffle his lineup and throw some of his newer players into the deep end of the pool. Surprisingly, it was the defense that held up best over the next several weeks. The biggest boon came from in goal where freshman John Muse took complete control of the starting role and kept the Eagles in contention for most games. Unfortunately, the offense was lacking without Bradford and by the Thanksgiving break, BC had both more losses and more ties than victories and had dropped out of both polls.

=== Resurgence and reinjury ===
A change to the lines just before the break appeared to work well and when the team returned in late November, the unit of Nathan Gerbe, Brian Gibbons and Ben Smith began to take over. The Eagles won their next five matches, averaging more than six goals per game over that stretch. After their winning streak was snapped by Clarkson, the Eagles welcomed Bradford back to the lineup on January 9. He replaced Smith on the top line and earned a point in each of his next four games. In the second period of the game at Boston University on January 19, Bradford broke his left humerus for a second time. While surgery was not required, he was ruled out for the remainder of the season.

Smith rejoined the top line and BC continued to plug along despite the pall cast over the club. BC had a tough fight on its hands when it met for the 56th edition of the Beanpot. The Eagles got behind 2–3 to BU but a pair of goals from Gerbe, the second coming in overtime, sent BC to the championship game. Boston College faced Harvard in front of a raucous crowd and held a 1-goal lead going into the third. The two combined for 5 goals in the final frame, and ended up tied at 5-all at the end of 60 minutes. BC completely dominated the overtime session, outshooting the Crimson 7–0. Freshman Nick Petrecki became an instant hero for BC by scoring twice, including the game-winner, and giving the program its first Beanpot victory in 4 years.

=== Slumping after the Beanpot ===
After the tournament victory, the offense for Boston College suddenly went silent. The Eagles went 1–5–1 over their next seven games and scored more than 2 goals in just one contest. The mounting losses put the Eagles in jeopardy of missing out on the postseason if they performed poorly in the Hockey East Tournament. As they began their postseason the Eagles were lumped in with teams with inferior records. Because both the CCHA and WCHA were considered to be stronger conferences, Boston College could not afford to flame out in their conference tournament.

=== Hockey East Tournament ===
Due in part to their late-season slump, Boston College opened the postseason against a ranked Providence team. BC got off to tremendous starts in both matches, scoring the first four goals in each contest and easily downing the Friars. While Gerbe scored twice in each contest, it was Muse's 68 saves that were the highlight for the series. The wins sent BC to the semifinal against league champion New Hampshire, who had swept BC in their season series. At the start it appeared that the Wildcats were going to go four for four when they jumped out to a 2–0 lead after one period. Ben Smith cut into the advantage but UNH followed that with two more goals, one on the penalty kill, to take a commanding 4–1 lead past the midway point of the game. BC redoubled its efforts and ended up firing 24 shots on the Wildcat goal in the second, managing to score twice more before the end of the frame to give them a fighting chance. A goal by Dan Bertram tied the score early in the third which is when both goaltenders took over. Both Muse and Kevin Regan stopped every shot for the next 55 minutes and pushed the game into a third overtime. 43 seconds into the 6th period, Benn Ferriero ended the match with his 16th goal of the season.

Despite the potential hangover from the extended game, BC romped over an upstart Vermont squad in the final. BC repeated as tournament champions and earned the conference's automatic bid to the NCAA tournament.

=== NCAA Tournament ===
Despite winning the conference championship, BC's record only earned them a 2nd seed for the Northeast Regional. Ben Smith kicked off the scoring for the Eagles in their first game in the opening period. After exchanging goals with Minnesota in the second, Boston College built a 4–1 lead in the third with scoring from their depth lines. The Gophers pulled their goaltender with 3:40 left after they got on the power play and cut into BC's lead. Muse held the fort afterwards and an empty-net goal from Gerbe salted the game away.

The biggest test for the Eagles was awaiting them in the regional final. #2 overall seed Miami, who had spent much of the year ranked #1, was a tournament favorite and lived up to their billing early in the game. The RedHawks opened the scoring just 90 seconds into the game but were held in check by BC's defense for the remainder of the period. Miami doubled their advantage midway through the second and appeared to be heading towards a victory. On a delayed penalty, BC pulled Muse and they were able to parlay the impromptu 6-on-5 into their first goal of the night. Just 14 seconds after the ensuing faceoff, Nathan Gerbe scored to tie the game. A minute and a half after that, Ben Smith gave BC their first lead of the game. The stunning turnaround put BC in the driver seat and kept the team's championship drive alive. While Miami tied the game in the third, neither team could get the winner before the buzzer sounded and BC headed to its 14th overtime game of the season. While BC may have been old hands at extra hockey, it was Miami who shelled the BC cage. Muse turned aside 10 shots in 12 minutes of game action and gave his team enough time to capitalize on their chances. A sprawled-out Joe Whitney swiped a rebound past Jeff Zatkoff to send BC to their third consecutive frozen four.

Compared to their quarterfinal game, BC's match against North Dakota was less than thrilling. The Eagles scored four times in the opening frame and added two more in the second to take an almost insurmountable lead over the Fighting Sioux. Gerbe recorded a hat-trick to raise his total on the season to 33 and take over as the national leader in both goals and points. After the rather pedestrian 6–1 win, BC only had Notre Dame remaining in their path.

In the final game of the season, Boston College got off to a slow start but the first period ended up with just 12 shots combined. Notre Dame was only able to get the puck on goal 5 times despite having three separate power plays. While the Irish couldn't capitalize on their opportunities, BC took full advantage in the second, scoring twice on the man-advantage and adding a third at even strength to build a 3–0 lead. Notre Dame managed to score one of their own but BC's defense held and stopped the Fighting Irish from doing any more scoring for the remainder of the game. Smith netted the only marker of the third and the Eagles skated to a fairly comfortable victory, earning the third NCAA championship in program history.

With his hat-trick in the semifinal and contributing on every goal in the championship, Nathan Gerbe was the obvious choice for Tournament MOP.

== Recruiting ==
Boston College added five freshmen for the 2007–2008 season, including one defenseman, two forwards, and two goalies.

Player	Position	Nationality	Notes
Brian Gibbons	Forward	United States	Braintree, Massachusetts; Earned All-Founder's League first-team honors as senior center at Salisbury in 2006–07.
Ryan Hayes	Forward	United States	Syracuse, New York; Returned to juniors after 6 games.
Andrew Margolin	Goalie	United States	Mahwah, NJ; Two-time Founder's League All-Star.
John Muse	Goalie	United States	East Falmouth, MA; Earned US Hockey Report Goaltender of the Year honors as a senior at Nobles.
Nick Petrecki	Defense	United States	Clifton Park, NY; Selected 28th overall by SJS in 2007 draft.
Joe Whitney	Forward	United States	Reading, MA; Gained All-NESPAC East honors as a junior at Lawrence Academy.

== 2007–2008 Roster ==
=== Departures from 2006–2007 Team ===
- Brian Boyle, F – Graduation
- Joe Rooney, F – Graduation
- Justin Greene, F – Graduation
- Corey Griffin, F – left team
- Joseph Ehiorobo, F – left team
- Brett Motherwell, D – dismissed midseason
- Brian O'Hanley, D – dismissed midseason
- Adam Reasoner, G – left team
- Cory Schneider, G – signed with VAN

=== 2007–2008 Eagles ===
Managers
#	State	Player (Draft)	Title	Year	Hometown	High School
-	(New Jersey)	Justin Murphy	Manager	Junior	Fair Haven, New Jersey	Choate
3	(Massachusetts)	Ken Ryan	Manager	Junior	South Boston, Massachusetts	BC High
-	(Massachusetts)	Mike Feeley	Manager	Sophomore	Dedham, Massachusetts	St. Sebastian's

Goaltenders
#	State	Player (Draft)	Catches	Year	Hometown	Previous team
1	(Massachusetts)	John Muse	L	Freshman	East Falmouth, Massachusetts	Nobles
29	(Connecticut)	Alex Kremer	L	Sophomore	Darien, Connecticut	Taft
30	(New Jersey)	Andrew Margolin	L	Freshman	Mahwah, New Jersey	Taft

Defensemen
#	State	Player (Draft)	Shoots	Year	Hometown	Previous team
2	(Massachusetts)	Anthony Aiello (MIN, 129th overall 2005)	L	Junior	Braintree, Massachusetts	Thayer Academy
4	(New York (state))	Michael Brennan – C	R	Senior	Smithtown, New York	Westminster School
5	(New York (state))	Tim Filangieri	L	Junior	Islip Terrace, New York	Waterloo (USHL)
6	(New York (state))	Tim Kunes (CAR, 145th overall 2005)	L	Junior	Huntington, New York	New England (EJHL)
7	(Minnesota)	Carl Sneep (PIT, 32nd overall 2006)	R	Sophomore	Nisswa, Minnesota	Brainerd
26	(New York (state))	Nick Petrecki (SJS, 28th overall 2007)	L	Freshman	Clifton Park, New York	Omaha (USHL)

Forwards
#	State	Player (Draft)	Shoots	Year	Hometown	Previous team
9	(Michigan)	Nathan Gerbe (BUF, 145th overall 2005)	L	Junior	Oxford, Michigan	US NTDP (USHL)
11	(Minnesota)	Joe Adams	L	Senior	Wayzata, Minnesota	New Hampshire (EJHL)
12	(Connecticut)	Ben Smith (CHI, 169th overall 2008)	R	Sophomore	Avon, Connecticut	Westminster School
13	(Massachusetts)	Pat Gannon	R	Senior	Arlington, Massachusetts	Boston (EJHL)
14	(Massachusetts)	Matt Greene – A	L	Senior	Plymouth, Massachusetts	Boston College High School
15	(Massachusetts)	Joe Whitney	L	Freshman	Reading, Massachusetts	Lawrence Academy
17	(Massachusetts)	Brian Gibbons	L	Freshman	Braintree, Massachusetts	Salisbury School
18	(Massachusetts)	Kyle Kucharski	L	Senior	Saugus, Massachusetts	Phillips Andover
19	(British Columbia)	Brock Bradford	R	Junior	Burnaby, British Columbia	Omaha (USHL)
21	(Massachusetts)	Benn Ferriero (PHX, 196th overall 2006)	R	Junior	Essex, Massachusetts	Governor's Academy
22	(Alberta)	Dan Bertram – A (CHI, 54th overall 2005)	R	Senior	Calgary, Alberta	Camrose (AJHL)
24	(Massachusetts)	Matt Lombardi	R	Sophomore	Milton, Massachusetts	Governor's Academy
25	(Ontario)	Matt Price	R	Sophomore	Milton, Ontario	Milton Icehawks (OPJHL)
27	(New York (state))	Andrew Orpik (BUF, 227th overall 2005)	R	Junior	East Amherst, New York	Thayer Academy

== Standings ==
2007–08 Hockey East standings
	Conference							Overall					
	GP	W	L	T	PTS	GF	GA	GP	W	L	T	GF	GA
#6 New Hampshire†	27	19	5	3	41	84	54	38	25	10	3	132	94
Boston University	27	15	9	3	33	97	72	40	19	17	4	135	117
Vermont	27	13	9	5	31	67	78	39	17	15	7	88	106
#1 Boston College*	27	11	9	7	29	82	67	44	25	11	8	160	101
Providence	27	11	11	5	27	66	66	36	14	17	5	91	99
Northeastern	27	12	13	2	26	73	80	37	16	18	3	92	105
Massachusetts–Lowell	27	10	13	4	24	70	76	37	16	17	4	100	96
Massachusetts	27	9	13	5	23	73	71	36	14	16	6	98	97
Maine	27	9	15	3	21	59	73	34	13	18	3	77	92
Merrimack	27	6	18	3	15	48	82	34	12	18	4	71	93
Championship: Boston College † indicates conference regular season champion * indicates conference tournament champion Final rankings: USA Today/USA Hockey Magazine Top 15 Poll

== Schedule and results ==
Date	Time	Opponent^{#}	Rank^{#}	Site	TV	Decision	Result	Attendance	Record
Ice Breaker
October 13	5:37 PM	vs. #10 Michigan*	#2	Xcel Energy Center • Saint Paul, Minnesota (Ice Breaker Semifinal)		Muse	L 3–4 ^{OT}	14,127	0–1–0
October 14	5:35 PM	vs. Rensselaer*	#2	Xcel Energy Center • Saint Paul, Minnesota (Ice Breaker Consolation Game)		Muse	W 4–1	14,868	1–1–0
Regular Season
October 19	8:05 PM	#1 North Dakota*	#4	Conte Forum • Chestnut Hill, Massachusetts		Muse	T 0–0 ^{^}	7,884	1–1–1
October 21	4:05 PM	at Vermont	#4	Gutterson Fieldhouse • Burlington, Vermont		Muse	T 3–3 ^{OT}	4,003	1–1–2 (0–0–1)
October 26	7:05 PM	Merrimack	#5	Conte Forum • Chestnut Hill, Massachusetts		Muse	W 7–1	4,308	2–1–2 (1–0–1)
October 28	1:00 PM	at Merrimack	#5	J. Thom Lawler Rink • North Andover, Massachusetts		Muse	W 4–2	2,200	3–1–2 (2–0–1)
November 2	7:05 PM	Maine	#5	Conte Forum • Chestnut Hill, Massachusetts		Muse	T 1–1 ^{OT}	6,017	3–1–3 (2–0–2)
November 9	8:05 PM	Merrimack	#7	Conte Forum • Chestnut Hill, Massachusetts		Muse	T 3–3 ^{OT}	4,419	3–1–4 (2–0–3)
November 10	7:00 PM	at New Hampshire	#7	Whittemore Center • Durham, New Hampshire		Muse	L 2–5	6,501	3–2–4 (2–1–3)
November 14	7:00 PM	at #14 Massachusetts	#11	Mullins Center • Amherst, Massachusetts		Muse	T 1–1 ^{OT}	7,319	3–2–5 (2–1–4)
November 17	7:05 PM	#14 Massachusetts	#11	Conte Forum • Chestnut Hill, Massachusetts		Muse	L 2–3	4,877	3–3–5 (2–2–4)
November 23	7:05 PM	#20 Northeastern	#14	Conte Forum • Chestnut Hill, Massachusetts		Muse	L 3–4 ^{OT}	7,289	3–4–5 (2–3–4)
November 30	7:00 PM	Boston University	#19	Conte Forum • Chestnut Hill, Massachusetts (Rivalry)		Muse	W 6–2	7,884	4–4–5 (3–3–4)
December 1	7:06 PM	at Boston University	#19	Agganis Arena • Boston, Massachusetts (Rivalry)		Muse	W 4–3	6,224	5–4–5 (4–3–4)
December 12	7:00 PM	at #14 Harvard*	#15	Bright-Landry Hockey Center • Boston, Massachusetts		Muse	W 7–2	2,469	6–4–5
Dodge Holiday Classic
December 29	5:07 PM	vs. Air Force*	#14	Mariucci Arena • Minneapolis, Minnesota (Dodge Holiday Classic Semifinal)		Muse	W 8–2	10,046	7–4–5
December 30	5:07 PM	vs. RIT*	#14	Mariucci Arena • Minneapolis, Minnesota (Dodge Holiday Classic Championship)		Muse	W 6–0	9,862	8–4–5
January 5	6:00 PM	at #12 Clarkson*	#11	Cheel Arena • Potsdam, New York		Muse	L 2–4	3,425	8–5–5
January 9	7:36 PM	Vermont	#12	Conte Forum • Chestnut Hill, Massachusetts		Muse	W 4–1	4,208	9–5–5 (5–3–4)
January 11	7:05 PM	Vermont	#12	Conte Forum • Chestnut Hill, Massachusetts		Muse	W 5–2	6,764	10–5–5 (6–3–4)
January 18	7:31 PM	at #15 Massachusetts–Lowell	#11	Tsongas Center • Lowell, Massachusetts		Muse	W 5–4	5,065	11–5–5 (7–3–4)
January 19	7:05 PM	at Boston University	#11	Conte Forum • Chestnut Hill, Massachusetts (Rivalry)		Muse	T 2–2 ^{OT}	7,884	11–5–6 (7–3–5)
January 25	7:00 PM	at Maine	#8	Alfond Arena • Orono, Maine		Muse	T 3–3 ^{OT}	5,365	11–5–7 (7–3–6)
January 26	7:07 PM	at Maine	#8	Alfond Arena • Orono, Maine		Muse	W 4–2	5,328	12–5–7 (8–3–6)
February 1	7:00 PM	#14 Providence	#9	Conte Forum • Chestnut Hill, Massachusetts		Muse	L 2–3	5,491	12–6–7 (8–4–6)
Beanpot
February 4	8:18 PM	vs. Boston University*	#9	TD Banknorth Garden • Boston, Massachusetts (Beanpot Semifinal; Rivalry)		Muse	W 4–3 ^{OT}	17,565	13–6–7
February 8	7:00 PM	at #18 Massachusetts	#9	Mullins Center • Amherst, Massachusetts		Muse	W 4–1	7,485	14–6–7 (9–4–6)
February 11	8:00 PM	vs. Harvard*	#7	TD Banknorth Garden • Boston, Massachusetts (Beanpot Championship)		Muse	W 6–5 ^{OT}	17,565	15–6–7
February 15	7:00 PM	#18 Massachusetts–Lowell	#7	Conte Forum • Chestnut Hill, Massachusetts		Muse	L 1–3	4,688	15–7–7 (9–5–6)
February 18	7:00 PM	at #18 Massachusetts–Lowell	#7	Tsongas Center • Lowell, Massachusetts		Muse	W 5–2	5,302	16–7–7 (10–5–6)
February 22	7:31 PM	#3 New Hampshire	#7	Conte Forum • Chestnut Hill, Massachusetts		Muse	L 0–2	5,281	16–8–7 (10–6–6)
February 23	7:00 PM	at #3 New Hampshire	#7	Whittemore Center • Durham, New Hampshire		Muse	L 1–5	6,501	16–9–7 (10–7–6)
February 29	7:05 PM	#19 Providence	#8	Conte Forum • Chestnut Hill, Massachusetts		Muse	L 2–3	6,208	16–10–7 (10–8–6)
March 1	7:00 PM	at #19 Providence	#8	Schneider Arena • Providence, Rhode Island		Muse	T 2–2 ^{OT}	2,712	16–10–8 (10–8–7)
March 7	7:00 PM	Northeastern	#10	Conte Forum • Chestnut Hill, Massachusetts		Muse	L 2–3 ^{OT}	6,588	16–11–8 (10–9–7)
March 8	7:05 PM	at Northeastern	#10	Matthews Arena • Boston, Massachusetts		Muse	W 4–1	3,842	17–11–8 (11–9–7)
Hockey East Tournament
March 14	7:05 PM	#20 Providence*	#10	Conte Forum • Chestnut Hill, Massachusetts (Hockey East Quarterfinals Game 1)		Muse	W 5–1	2,788	18–11–8
March 15	7:00 PM	#20 Providence*	#10	Conte Forum • Chestnut Hill, Massachusetts (Hockey East Quarterfinals Game 2)		Muse	W 5–1	2,493	19–11–8
March 21	5:05 PM	vs. #5 New Hampshire*	#8	TD Banknorth Garden • Boston, Massachusetts (Hockey East Semifinal)		Muse	W 5–4 ^{3OT}	12,522	20–11–8
March 22	7:05 PM	vs. #18 Vermont*	#8	TD Banknorth Garden • Boston, Massachusetts (Hockey East Championship)		Muse	W 4–0	11,766	21–11–8
NCAA Tournament
March 29	7:51 PM	vs. #10 Minnesota*	#7	DCU Center • Worcester, Massachusetts (Northeast Regional Semifinal)		Muse	W 5–2	7,357	22–11–8
March 30	4:30 PM	vs. #2 Miami*	#7	DCU Center • Worcester, Massachusetts (Northeast Regional Final)		Muse	W 4–3 ^{OT}	5,911	23–11–8
April 10	4:05 PM	vs. #3 North Dakota*	#7	Pepsi Center • Denver, Colorado (National Semifinal)		Muse	W 6–1	18,543	24–11–8
April 12	5:05 PM	vs. #12 Notre Dame*	#7	Pepsi Center • Denver, Colorado (National Championship)		Muse	W 4–1	18,632	25–11–8
*Non-conference game. ^{#}Rankings from USCHO.com Poll. All times are in Eastern Time. Source:

^ Game shortened to 2 periods due to poor ice conditions.

== 2008 national championship ==
April 12, 2008; 8:00 pm	(NE2) Boston College	4 – 1 (0–0, 3–1, 1–0)	(W4) Notre Dame	Pepsi Center – Denver, Colorado; Attendance: 18,632

Game reference
Referee: Todd Anderson; Linesmen: Tim Swiader; Butch Mousseaux

Scoring summary
Period	Team	Goal	Assist(s)	Time	Score
1st	None				
2nd	BC	Nathan Gerbe (34)	Gibbons and Smith	22:23	1–0 BC
2nd	BC	Nathan Gerbe (35) – GW PP	Smith and Bertram	25:37	2–0 BC
2nd	BC	Joe Whitney (11) – PP	Gerbe and Ferriero	28:11	3–0 BC
2nd	ND	Kevin Deeth (11)	Lawson and Cole	29:07	3–1 BC
3rd	BC	Ben Smith (25)	Gerbe and Gibbons	45:31	4–1 BC
Penalty summary
Period	Team	Player	Penalty	Time	PIM
1st	BC	Kyle Kucharski	Holding the Stick	08:41	2:00
1st	BC	Matt Greene	Cross-Checking	14:33	2:00
1st	ND	Brock Sheahan	Roughing	17:02	2:00
1st	BC	Anthony Aiello	Tripping	18:24	2:00
2nd	BC	Andrew Orpik	Slashing	22:51	2:00
2nd	ND	Ryan Thang	Interference	24:58	2:00
2nd	ND	Dan VeNard	Cross-Checking	26:29	2:00
2nd	ND	Dan Kissel	Hooking	27:27	2:00
2nd	BC	Kyle Kucharski	Holding	27:32	2:00
2nd	ND	Dan VeNard	High-Sticking	36:49	2:00
3rd	BC	Nick Petrecki	Elbowing	40:08	2:00
3rd	BC	Matt Price	Obstruction Tripping	48:05	2:00
3rd	BC	Matt Greene	Hooking	49:54	2:00

Shots by period
Team	1	2	3	T
Notre Dame	5	8	8	21
Boston College	7	11	5	23

Goaltenders
Team	Name	Saves	Goals against	Time on ice
ND	Jordan Pearce	19	4	58:31
BC	John Muse	20	1	60:00

== Scoring statistics ==
Name	Position	Games	Goals	Assists	Points	PIM
Nathan Gerbe	C/LW	43	35	33	68	65
Joe Whitney	LW/RW	44	11	40	51	50
Ben Smith	C/RW	44	25	25	50	12
Benn Ferriero	RW	44	17	25	42	71
Dan Bertram	RW	43	10	27	37	26
Brian Gibbons	C/W	43	13	22	35	32
Pat Gannon	F	44	6	17	23	18
Carl Sneep	D	44	3	12	15	15
Andrew Orpik	F	41	7	6	13	57
Anthony Aiello	D	43	3	10	13	57
Matt Greene	F	44	8	4	12	32
Nick Petrecki	D	42	5	7	12	102
Matt Price	F	44	3	8	11	20
Kyle Kucharski	F	42	3	6	9	45
Michael Brennan	D	44	3	5	8	52
Tim Kunes	D	43	1	7	8	6
Tim Filangieri	D	43	1	5	6	45
Brock Bradford	C	5	3	2	5	2
Matt Lombardi	RW	40	1	3	4	6
Ryan Hayes	RW	6	2	1	3	0
Brian O'Hanley	D	1	0	1	1	0
John Muse	G	44	0	1	1	2
Brett Motherwell	D	1	0	0	0	0
Joe Adams	LW	4	0	0	0	2
Bench	-	-	-	-	-	8
Total			160	267	427	708

== Goaltending statistics ==
Name	Games	Minutes	Wins	Losses	Ties	Goals Against	Saves	Shut Outs	SV %	GAA
John Muse	44	2725:06	25	11	8	100	1171	3	.921	2.20
Empty Net	-	8:34	-	-	-	1	-	-	-	-
Total	44	2733:40	25	11	8	101	1171	3	.921	2.22

== Rankings ==
Poll	Week																										
Poll	Pre	1	2	3	4	5	6	7	8	9	10	11	12	13	14	15	16	17	18	19	20	21	22	23	24	25	26 (Final)
USCHO.com	2 (3)	-	4	5	5	7	11	14	19	-	15	14	11	12	11	8	9	9	7	7	8	10	10	8	7	-	-
USA Today	3	2	4	5	5	6	9	13	NR	NR	15	14	-	12	11	8	9	9	7	7	8	9	9	7	7	3	1 (34)

Note: USCHO did not release a poll in weeks 1, 9, 25, or 26, USA Today did not release a poll in week 12.

== Awards and honors ==
Player	Award	Ref
Nathan Gerbe	USA Hockey National College Player of the Year	
Brian Gibbons	Beanpot Tournament MVP	
Nathan Gerbe	NCAA Tournament Most Outstanding Player	
Nathan Gerbe	AHCA East First Team All-American	
Matt Greene	Hockey East Best Defensive Forward	
Nathan Gerbe	William Flynn Tournament Most Valuable Player	
Nathan Gerbe	All-Hockey East First Team	
Joe Whitney	Hockey East All-Rookie Team	
Benn Ferriero	Hockey East All-Tournament Team	
Nathan Gerbe	Hockey East All-Tournament Team	
Michael Brennan	Hockey East All-Tournament Team	
Carl Sneep	Hockey East All-Tournament Team	
John Muse	Hockey East All-Tournament Team	
Nathan Gerbe	NCAA All-Tournament Team	
Ben Smith	NCAA All-Tournament Team	
Michael Brennan	NCAA All-Tournament Team	
John Muse	NCAA All-Tournament Team	

== Players drafted into the NHL ==
=== 2008 NHL entry draft ===
= NHL All-Star team	= NHL All-Star	= NHL All-Star and NHL All-Star team	= Did not play in the NHL

Round	Pick	Player	NHL team
2	60	Jimmy Hayes^{†}	Toronto Maple Leafs
6	157	Cam Atkinson^{†}	Columbus Blue Jackets
6	169	Ben Smith	Chicago Blackhawks

† incoming freshman
