= 2008 Hockey East men's ice hockey tournament =

2008 Hockey East Men's ice hockey tournament
- Dates: March 14–22, 2008
- Teams: 8
- Finals site: TD Banknorth Garden; Boston, Massachusetts
- Champions: Boston College (8th title)
- Winning coach: Jerry York (5th title)
- MVP: Nathan Gerbe (Boston College)
- Hockey East Men's Ice Hockey Tournaments

The 2008 Hockey East Men's Ice Hockey Tournament was the 24th tournament in the history of the conference. It was played between March 14 and March 22, 2008 at campus locations and at the TD Banknorth Garden in Boston, Massachusetts. By winning the tournament, Boston College was awarded the Lamoriello Trophy and an automatic bid to the 2008 NCAA Division I Men's Ice Hockey Tournament.

== Format ==
The tournament featured three rounds of play. The teams that finish below eighth in the conference are not eligible for tournament play. In the first round, the first and eighth seeds, the second and seventh seeds, the third seed and sixth seeds, and the fourth seed and fifth seeds played a best-of-three with the winner advancing to the semifinals. In the semifinals, the highest and lowest seeds and second highest and second lowest seeds play a single-elimination game, with the winner advancing to the championship game. The tournament champion receives an automatic bid to the 2008 NCAA Division I Men's Ice Hockey Tournament.

== Regular season standings ==
Note: GP = Games played; W = Wins; L = Losses; T = Ties; PTS = Points; GF = Goals For; GA = Goals Against

2007–08 Hockey East standings
	Conference							Overall					
	GP	W	L	T	PTS	GF	GA	GP	W	L	T	GF	GA
#6 New Hampshire†	27	19	5	3	41	84	54	38	25	10	3	132	94
Boston University	27	15	9	3	33	97	72	40	19	17	4	135	117
Vermont	27	13	9	5	31	67	78	39	17	15	7	88	106
#1 Boston College*	27	11	9	7	29	82	67	44	25	11	8	160	101
Providence	27	11	11	5	27	66	66	36	14	17	5	91	99
Northeastern	27	12	13	2	26	73	80	37	16	18	3	92	105
Massachusetts–Lowell	27	10	13	4	24	70	76	37	16	17	4	100	96
Massachusetts	27	9	13	5	23	73	71	36	14	16	6	98	97
Maine	27	9	15	3	21	59	73	34	13	18	3	77	92
Merrimack	27	6	18	3	15	48	82	34	12	18	4	71	93
Championship: Boston College † indicates conference regular season champion * indicates conference tournament champion Final rankings: USA Today/USA Hockey Magazine Top 15 Poll

== Bracket ==
Quarterfinals; March 14–16
1	New Hampshire	4	7	—
8	Massachusetts	1	2	—
2	Boston University	5	1	4
7	Massachusetts-Lowell	3	4	2
(Pairings are reseeded after the first round)
3	Vermont	1	1	4
6	Northeastern	0	2*	1
4	Boston College	5	5	—
5	Providence	1	1	—

Semifinals; March 21
1	New Hampshire	4
4	Boston College	5***
2	Boston University	1
3	Vermont	3

Championship; March 22
3	Vermont	0
4	Boston College	4

Note: * denotes overtime period(s)

=== Quarterfinals ===
==== (1) New Hampshire vs. (8) Massachusetts ====
March 14	New Hampshire	4 – 1	Massachusetts	Whittemore Center

March 15	New Hampshire	7 – 2	Massachusetts	Whittemore Center

New Hampshire won series 2–0

==== (2) Boston University vs. (7) Massachusetts-Lowell ====
March 14	Boston University	5 – 3	Massachusetts-Lowell	Agganis Arena

March 15	Boston University	1 – 4	Massachusetts-Lowell	Agganis Arena

March 16	Boston University	4 – 2	Massachusetts-Lowell	Agganis Arena

Boston University won series 2–1

==== (3) Vermont vs. (6) Northeastern ====
March 14	Vermont	1 – 0	Northeastern	Gutterson Fieldhouse

March 15	Vermont	1 – 2	OT	Northeastern	Gutterson Fieldhouse

March 16	Vermont	4 – 1	Northeastern	Gutterson Fieldhouse

Vermont won series 2–1

==== (4) Boston College vs. (5) Providence ====
March 14	Boston College	5 – 1	Providence	Kelley Rink

March 15	Boston College	5 – 1	Providence	Kelley Rink

Boston College won series 2–0

=== Semifinals ===
==== (1) New Hampshire vs. (4) Boston College ====
March 21	New Hampshire	4 – 5	3OT	Boston College	TD Banknorth Garden	Recap
Bobby Butler - pp - 05:17; Jamie Fritsch - 15:16		First period		No scoring
Bobby Butler - 09:27; Thomas Fortney - sh - 12:23		Second period		01:34 - pp - Ben Smith; 13:42 - pp - Joe Whitney; 16:37 - Brian Gibbons
No scoring		Third period		04:53 - Dan Bertram
No scoring		Third overtime period		00:43 - pp - Benn Ferriero
Kevin Regan ( 62 saves / 67 shots )		Goalie stats		John Muse ( 45 saves / 49 shots )

==== (2) Boston University vs. (3) Vermont ====
March 21	Boston University	1 – 3	Vermont	TD Banknorth Garden	Recap
Chris Higgins - 10:17		First period	No scoring
No scoring		Second period	13:48 - Peter Lenes; 14:17 - Colin Vock
No scoring		Third period	19:20 - en - Corey Carlson
Brett Bennett ( 13 saves / 15 shots )		Goalie stats	Joe Fallon ( 25 saves / 26 shots )

=== Championship ===
==== (3) Vermont vs. (4) Boston College ====
March 22	Vermont	0 – 4	Boston College	TD Banknorth Garden	Recap
No Scoring		First period	18:32 - Ben Smith
No scoring		Second period	05:01 - Tim Kunes; 19:40 - pp - Brian Gibbons
No scoring		Third period	18:55 - en - Nathan Gerbe
Joe Fallon ( 24 saves / 27 shots )		Goalie stats	John Muse ( 29 saves / 29 shots )

== Tournament awards ==
=== All-Tournament Team ===
- F Bobby Butler (New Hampshire)
- F Benn Ferriero (Boston College)
- F Nathan Gerbe* (Boston College)
- D Michael Brennan (Boston College)
- D Carl Sneep (Boston College)
- G John Muse (Boston College)

* Tournament MVP(s)
