= 2008 NCAA Division I men's ice hockey tournament =

- 2008 Frozen Four logo
- Teams: 16
- Finals site: Pepsi Center, Denver, Colorado
- Champions: Boston College Eagles (3rd title)
- Runner-up: Notre Dame Fighting Irish (1st title game)
- Semifinalists: Michigan Wolverines (23rd Frozen Four); North Dakota Fighting Sioux (18th Frozen Four)
- Winning coach: Jerry York (3rd title)
- MOP: Nathan Gerbe (Boston College)
- Attendance: 89,204

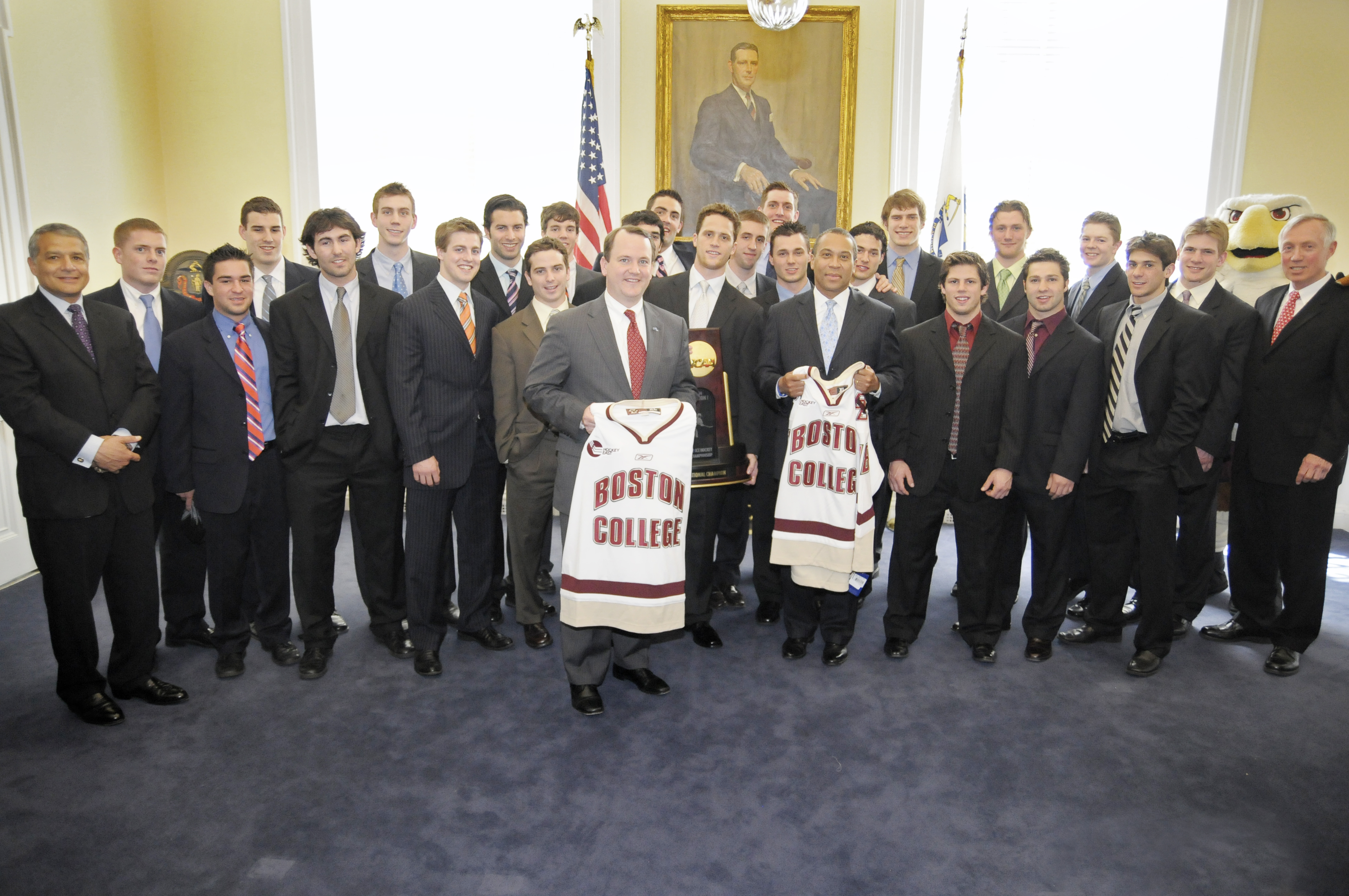
Boston College Eagles players and coaches celebrate their victory at the Massachusetts State House with Governor Deval Patrick and Lieutenant Governor Tim Murray

The 2008 NCAA Division I men's ice hockey tournament involved 16 schools playing in single-elimination play to determine the national champion of men's NCAA Division I college ice hockey. The tournament began on March 28, 2008, and ended with the championship game on April 12.

Boston College, coached by Jerry York, won its third national title after consecutive runner-up finishes with a 4–1 victory in the championship game over Notre Dame, coached by Jeff Jackson.

Nathan Gerbe, junior forward for Boston College, scored five goals in the final two games and was named the Frozen Four Most Outstanding Player.

This was the first tournament in 47 years to have two teams from the same conference play in the opening round. This occurred due to the glut of WCHA teams that received 2nd- and 3rd-seeds in the regional divisions.

Starting with this year's Frozen Four and ending with 2013, five of the next six tournaments featured at least one team making their first appearance in the Frozen Four, with 2011 being the only year to feature four teams with previous Frozen Four appearances.

== Tournament procedure ==
2008 Regionals (blue) and Frozen Four (red)

The NCAA Men's Division I Ice Hockey Championship is a single-elimination tournament featuring 16 teams representing all six Division I conferences in the nation. The Championship Committee seeds the entire field from 1 to 16 within four regionals of 4 teams. The winners of the six Division I conference championships receive automatic bids to participate in the NCAA Championship.

In setting up the tournament, the Championship Committee seeks to ensure "competitive equity, financial success and likelihood of playoff-type atmosphere at each regional site." A team serving as the host of a regional is placed within that regional. The top four teams are assigned overall seeds and placed within the bracket such that the national semifinals will feature the No. 1 seed versus the No. 4 seed and the No. 2 seed versus the No. 3 seed should the top four teams win their respective regional finals. Number 1 seeds are also placed as close to their home site as possible, with the No. 1 seed receiving first preference. Conference matchups are avoided in the first round; should five or more teams from one conference make the tournament, this guideline may be disregarded in favor of preserving the bracket's integrity.

The four regionals are officially named after their geographic areas. The following were the sites for the 2008 regionals:

March 28 and 29
East Regional, Times Union Center - Albany, New York (Hosts: ECAC Hockey and Rensselaer Polytechnic Institute)
West Regional, Broadmoor World Arena - Colorado Springs, Colorado (Hosts: Colorado College and the Colorado Springs Sports Commission)

March 29 and 30
Midwest Regional, Kohl Center - Madison, Wisconsin (Host: University of Wisconsin–Madison)
Northeast Regional, DCU Center - Worcester, Massachusetts (Host: College of the Holy Cross)

Each regional winner advanced to the Frozen Four:

April 10 and 12
Pepsi Center - Denver, Colorado (Hosts: University of Denver and the Metro Denver Sports Commission)

== Qualifying teams ==
The at-large bids, along with the seeding for each team in the tournament, were announced on Sunday, March 23. Six teams from the WCHA qualified for the tournament, a record for the number of teams from one conference.

East Regional – Albany						Northeast Regional – Worcester					
Seed	School	Conference	Record	Berth Type	Last Bid	Seed	School	Conference	Record	Berth Type	Last Bid
1	Michigan (1)	CCHA	31–5–4	Tournament champion	2007	1	Miami (2)	CCHA	32–7–1	At-Large Bid	2007
2	St. Cloud State	WCHA	19–15–5	At-Large Bid	2007	2	Boston College	Hockey East	21–11–8	Tournament champion	2007
3	Clarkson	ECAC	21–12–4	At-Large Bid	2007	3	Minnesota	WCHA	19–16–9	At-Large Bid	2007
4	Niagara	CHA	22–10–4	Tournament champion	2004	4	Air Force	Atlantic Hockey	21–11–6	Tournament champion	2007
Midwest Regional – Madison						West Regional – Colorado Springs					
Seed	School	Conference	Record	Berth Type	Last Bid	Seed	School	Conference	Record	Berth Type	Last Bid
1	North Dakota (3)	WCHA	26–10–4	At-Large Bid	2007	1	New Hampshire (4)	Hockey East	25–9–3	At-Large Bid	2007
2	Denver	WCHA	26–13–1	Tournament champion	2005	2	Colorado College	WCHA	28–11–1	At-Large Bid	2006
3	Wisconsin	WCHA	15–16–7	At-Large Bid	2006	3	Michigan State	CCHA	24–11–5	At-Large Bid	2007
4	Princeton	ECAC	21–13–0	Tournament champion	1998	4	Notre Dame	CCHA	24–15–4	At-Large Bid	2007

== Brackets ==
Regional Semifinals; March 28–29
1	Michigan (1)	5
4	Niagara	1
East – Albany – Fri/Sat
2	St. Cloud State	1
3	Clarkson	2
1	New Hampshire (4)	3
4	Notre Dame	7
West – Colorado Springs – Fri/Sat
2	Colorado College	1
3	Michigan State	3
1	Miami (2)	3*
4	Air Force	2
Northeast – Worcester – Sat/Sun
2	Boston College	5
3	Minnesota	2
1	North Dakota (3)	5
4	Princeton	1
Midwest – Madison – Sat/Sun
2	Denver	2
3	Wisconsin	6

Regional Finals; March 29–30
1	Michigan (1)	2
3	Clarkson	0
4	Notre Dame	3
3	Michigan State	1
1	Miami (2)	3
2	Boston College	4*
1	North Dakota (3)	3*
3	Wisconsin	2

National Semifinals; April 10
E1	Michigan (1)	4
W4	Notre Dame	5*
NE2	Boston College	6
MW1	North Dakota (3)	1

National Championship; April 12
W4	Notre Dame	1
NE2	Boston College	4

The number in parentheses denotes overall seed in the tournament
* denotes overtime period(s).

== Results ==
=== East Region – Albany, New York ===
==== Regional semifinal ====
March 28, 2008; 7:30 pm	(1) Michigan	5 – 1 (0–0, 2–0, 3–1)	(4) Niagara	Times Union Center; Attendance: 4,175

Game reference

Billy Sauer
Goalies
Juliano Pagliero
Referee:
Chip McDonald
Linesmen:
Rich Patry
Dave Brown

(Kolarik, Palushaj) Max Pacioretty (15) – PP – 20:55	1–0
(Kolarik, Pacioretty) Kevin Porter (29) – GW – 29:35	2–0
(Kolarik, Llewellyn) Kevin Porter (30) – 48:55	3–0
(Kolarik, Palushaj) Kevin Porter (31) – PP – 51:02	4–0
	4–1	55:50 – Matt Caruana (17) (Rocco)
(Pacioretty, Kolarik) Kevin Porter (32) – EN – 58:32	5–1

6 min
Penalties
10 min
39
Shots
17

March 28, 2008; 4:00 pm	(2) St. Cloud State	1 – 2 (0–0, 1–1, 0–1)	(3) Clarkson	Times Union Center; Attendance: 4,175

Game reference

Jase Weslosky
Goalies
David Leggio
Referee:
Tim Benedetto
Linesmen:
Chris Frederico
Chris Aughe

(Roe, Hartman) Garrett Raboin (3) – 24:08	1–0
	1–1	34:15 – David Cayer (10) (Rufenach, Mason)
	1–2	44:58 – Shea Guthrie (9) (Clitsome)

10 min
Penalties
14 min
25
Shots
40

==== Regional Final ====
March 29, 2008; 7:00 pm	(1) Michigan	2 – 0 (1–0, 0–0, 1–0)	(3) Clarkson	Times Union Center; Attendance: 4,301

Game reference
Billy Sauer	Goalies	David Leggio	Referee: Tim Benedetto; Linesmen: Chris Frederico; Chris Aughe
(Porter, Mitera) Aaron Palushaj (10) – GW PP – 14:23 / 1–0; (Kolarik, Pacioretty) Kevin Porter (33) – 40:26 / 2–0			Referee: Tim Benedetto; Linesmen: Chris Frederico; Chris Aughe
20 min	Penalties	18 min	Referee: Tim Benedetto; Linesmen: Chris Frederico; Chris Aughe
32	Shots	27	Referee: Tim Benedetto; Linesmen: Chris Frederico; Chris Aughe

=== Northeast Region – Worcester, Massachusetts ===
==== Regional semifinal ====
March 29, 2008; 4:00 pm	(1) Miami	3 – 2 (OT) (1–0, 0–2, 1–0, 1–0)	(4) Air Force	DCU Center; Attendance: 7,357

Game reference

Jeff Zatkoff
Goalies
Andrew Volkening
Referee:
Derek Shepherd
Linesmen:
Brad Shepherd
CJ Beaurline

(Camper, Jones) Tommy Wingels (15) – 00:19	1–0
	1–1	23:21 – Derrick Burnett (7) (Hajner, Fairchild)
	1–2	28:34 – Josh Print (1) (Page, Kozlak)
(Martinez, Cannone) Carter Camper (15) – PP – 53:44	2–2
(unassisted) Justin Mercier (25) – GW – 75:21	3–2

2 min
Penalties
10 min
33
Shots
25

March 29, 2008; 7:51 pm	(2) Boston College	5 – 2 (1–0, 1–1, 3–1)	(3) Minnesota	DCU Center; Attendance: 7,357

Game reference

John Muse
Goalies
Alex Kangas
Referee:
Brian Aaron
Linesmen:
Paul Tunison
Brent Gawlik

(Gerbe, Ferriero) Ben Smith (22) – 06:33	1–0
	1–1	23:01 – Mike Howe (7) (Fischer, Peltier)
(Whitney, Filangieri) Benn Ferriero (17) – 27:58	2–1
(Greene, Price) Pat Gannon (6) – GW – 44:25	3–1
(Ferriero) Joe Whitney (9) – 48:46	4–1
	4–2	56:33 – PP EA – Ben Gordon (7) (Wheeler, Howe)
(Gibbons) Nathan Gerbe (29) – EN – 59:43	5–2

12 min
Penalties
12 min
32
Shots
33

==== Regional Final ====
March 30, 2008; 4:30 pm	(1) Miami	3 – 4 (OT) (1–0, 1–3, 1–0, 0–1)	(2) Boston College	DCU Center; Attendance: 5,911

Game reference

Jeff Zatkoff
Goalies
John Muse
Referee:
Derek Shepherd
Linesmen:
Brad Shepherd
CJ Beaurline

(Martinez, Roeder) Jarod Palmer (10) – 01:30	1–0
(Kaufman) Nino Musitelli (9) – 28:32	2–0
	2–1	36:48 – Nick Petrecki (15) (Gannon, Price)
	2–2	37:02 – Nathan Gerbe (12) (Gibbons)
	2–3	38:46 – Ben Smith (23) (Bertram)
(Camper) Ryan Jones (31) – 49:02	3–3
	3–4	72:12 – GW – Joe Whitney (10) (Bertram, Gannon)

10 min
Penalties
12 min
37
Shots
42

=== Midwest Region – Madison, Wisconsin ===
==== Regional Semifinal ====
March 29, 2008; 2:00 pm	(1) North Dakota	5 – 1 (1–0, 1–0, 3–1)	(4) Princeton	Kohl Center; Attendance: 9,968

Game reference

Jean-Philippe Lamoureux
Goalies
Zane Kalemba
Referee:
Jeff Bunyon
Linesmen:
Tim Low
Chris Low

(Genoway, Marto) Andrew Kozek (17) – PP – 13:39	1–0
(Oshie, Watkins) Ryan Duncan (15) – GW – 36:18	2–0
(Martens, Genoway) Ryan Duncan (16) – PP – 48:13	3–0
(Oshie) Ryan Duncan (17) – 54:48	4–0
(unassisted) Chay Genoway (8) – SH EN – 56:28	5–0
	5–1	59:27 – Cam MacIntyre (13) (Jubinville)

6 min
Penalties
10 min
18
Shots
39

March 29, 2008; 5:30 pm	(2) Denver	2 – 6 (0–1, 1–1, 1–4)	(3) Wisconsin	Kohl Center; Attendance: 9,968

Game reference

Peter Mannino
Goalies
Shane Connelly
Referee:
Matt Shegos
Linesmen:
Tony Molina
Bruce Vida, Jr.

	0–1	08:59 – Michael Davies (12) (McBain, Geoffrion)
	0–2	28:15 – PP – Jamie McBain (4) (Engel, Turris)
(Martin, Ruegsegger) Dustin Jackson (12) – PP – 36:40	1–2
	1–3	49:19 – GW – Cody Goloubef (3) (Street)
	1–4	50:19 – John Mitchell (8) (Grotting)
(Martin, Maiani) Tom May (14) – 51:47	2–4
	2–5	54:38 – Michael Davies (13) (Drewiske)
	2–6	57:14 – EN – Davis Drewiske (5) (Davies)

16 min
Penalties
18 min
32
Shots
26

==== Regional Final ====
March 30, 2008; 6:00 pm	(1) North Dakota	3 – 2 (OT) (0–0, 0–2, 2–0, 1–0)	(3) Wisconsin	Kohl Center; Attendance: 9,816

Game reference

Jean-Philippe Lamoureux
Goalies
Shane Connelly
Referee:
Matt Shegos
Linesmen:
Tony Molina
Bruce Vida, Jr.

	0–1	25:38 – Jamie McBain (5) (Turris, Drewiske)
	0–2	39:21 – PP – Cody Goloubef (4) (Johnson, Klubertanz)
(Frattin, Watkins) Rylan Kaip (8) – 43:33	1–2
(Oshie) Ryan Duncan (18) – 44:20	2–2
(Bina, Oshie) Andrew Kozek (18) – GW – 61:47	3–2

10 min
Penalties
8 min
31
Shots
43

=== West Region – Colorado Springs, Colorado ===
==== Regional Semifinal ====
March 28, 2008; 4:30 pm	(1) New Hampshire	3 – 7 (2–2, 1–2, 0–3)	(4) Notre Dame	Broadmoor World Arena; Attendance: 6,634

Game reference

Kevin Regan
Goalies
Jordan Pearce
Referee:
Todd Anderson
Linesmen:
Butch Mousseaux
Tim Swiader

(van Riemsdyk) Jerry Pollastrone (14) – 01:04	1–0
	1–1	02:23 – PP – Ian Cole (6) (Ryan, Van Guilder)
(Flaishans, van Riemsdyk) Jerry Pollastrone (15) – 05:41	2–1
	2–2	17:25 – PP – Kyle Lawson (5) (Van Guilder, Thang)
	2–3	22:39 – Christian Hanson (11) (Carlin, Sheahan)
	2–4	29:53 – Dan Kissel (9) (unassisted)
(Flaishans, van Riemsdyk) Phil DeSimone (3) – EA – 33:09	3–4
	3–5	40:23 – Ryan Thang (17) (Van Guilder)
	3–6	56:54 – EN – Kevin Deeth (17) (Thang)
	3–7	57:54 – EN – Christian Hanson (12) (Regan, Blatchford)

27 min
Penalties
10 min
35
Shots
34

March 28, 2008; 8:00 pm	(2) Colorado College	1 – 3 (0–0, 0–3, 1–0)	(3) Michigan State	Broadmoor World Arena; Attendance: 6,287

Game reference

Richard Bachman
Goalies
Jeff Lerg
Referee:
John Gravallese
Linesmen:
Kevin Shea
Jack Millea

	0–1	29:27 – PP – Tim Kennedy (20) (Petry, Abdelkader)
	0–2	38:03 – GW PP – Jeff Dunne (3) (B. Lerg, Crowder)
	0–3	39:53 – Chris Mueller (13) (Kennedy, Abdelkader)
(Vlassopoulos) Derek Patrosso (5) – 52:07	1–3

16 min
Penalties
14 min
42
Shots
23

==== Regional Final ====
March 29, 2008; 8:00 pm	(3) Michigan State	1 – 3 (0–0, 1–1, 0–2)	(4) Notre Dame	Broadmoor World Arena; Attendance: 5,836

Game reference

Jeff Lerg
Goalies
Jordan Pearce
Referee:
Peter Feola
Linesmen:
Bill Bredin
Scott Whittemore

	0–1	22:43 – Christian Hanson (13) (Regan)
(Kennedy, Crowder) Justin Abdelkader (20) – 29:05	1–1
	1–2	54:06 – GW – Mark Van Guilder (12) (Ryan)
	1–3	55:20 – Teddy Ruth (2) (White, Hanson)

10 min
Penalties
8 min
21
Shots
26

=== Frozen Four – Denver, Colorado ===
==== National Semifinals ====
April 10, 2008; 7:30 pm	(E1) Michigan	4 – 5 (OT) (0–3, 2–0, 2–1, 0–1)	(W4) Notre Dame	Pepsi Center; Attendance: 18,544

Game reference

Billy Sauer (out 20:00)
Bryan Hogan (in 20:00)
Goalies
Jordan Pearce
Referee:
Todd Anderson
Linesmen:
Butch Mousseaux
Tim Swiader

	0–1	05:00 – Calle Ridderwall (4) (White)
	0–2	05:42 – Mark Van Guilder (24) (Thang, Sheahan)
	0–3	19:25 – SH – Ryan Thang (18) (unassisted)
(Porter, Hogan) Chad Kolarik (29) – 28:48	1–3
(Palushaj, Hagelin) Matt Rust (12) – 29:03	2–3
(Pacioretty, Palushaj) Chad Kolarik (30) – PP – 42:16	3–3
	3–4	51:30 – Kevin Deeth (10) (Kissel, Cole)
(Rust, Palushaj) Carl Hagelin (11) – 54:39	4–4
	4–5	65:44 – GW – Calle Ridderwall (24) (VeNard, White)

6 min
Penalties
10 min
33
Shots
29

April 10, 2008; 4:00 pm	(MW1) North Dakota	1 – 6 (0–4, 0–2, 1–0)	(NE2) Boston College	Pepsi Center; Attendance: 18,543

Game reference

Jean-Philippe Lamoureux
Goalies
John Muse
Referee:
Matt Sheegos
Linesmen:
Brent Gaulik
Bruce Vida

	0–1	07:08 – Andrew Orpik (7) (Kucharski)
	0–2	13:14 – Nathan Gerbe (31) (unassisted)
	0–3	15:13 – Nathan Gerbe (32) (Gibbons, Sneep)
	0–4	19:45 – Dan Bertram (10) (Gannon)
	0–5	26:37 – Nathan Gerbe (33) (Smith, Bertram)
	0–6	31:58 – Ben Smith (24) (Gerbe, Gibbons)
(Watkins) Jake Marto (2) – 58:44	1–6

18 min
Penalties
24 min
30
Shots
27

==== National Championship ====
April 12, 2008; 8:00 pm	(NE2) Boston College	4 – 1 (0–0, 3–1, 1–0)	(W4) Notre Dame	Pepsi Center; Attendance: 18,632

Game reference
Referee: Todd Anderson; Linesmen: Tim Swiader; Butch Mousseaux

Scoring summary
Period	Team	Goal	Assist(s)	Time	Score
1st	None				
2nd	BC	Nathan Gerbe (34)	Gibbons and Smith	22:23	1–0 BC
2nd	BC	Nathan Gerbe (35) – GW PP	Smith and Bertram	25:37	2–0 BC
2nd	BC	Joe Whitney (11) – PP	Gerbe and Ferriero	28:11	3–0 BC
2nd	ND	Kevin Deeth (11)	Lawson and Cole	29:07	3–1 BC
3rd	BC	Ben Smith (25)	Gerbe and Gibbons	45:31	4–1 BC
Penalty summary
Period	Team	Player	Penalty	Time	PIM
1st	BC	Kyle Kucharski	Holding the Stick	08:41	2:00
1st	BC	Matt Greene	Cross-Checking	14:33	2:00
1st	ND	Brock Sheahan	Roughing	17:02	2:00
1st	BC	Anthony Aiello	Tripping	18:24	2:00
2nd	BC	Andrew Orpik	Slashing	22:51	2:00
2nd	ND	Ryan Thang	Interference	24:58	2:00
2nd	ND	Dan VeNard	Cross-Checking	26:29	2:00
2nd	ND	Dan Kissel	Hooking	27:27	2:00
2nd	BC	Kyle Kucharski	Holding	27:32	2:00
2nd	ND	Dan VeNard	High-Sticking	36:49	2:00
3rd	BC	Nick Petrecki	Elbowing	40:08	2:00
3rd	BC	Matt Price	Obstruction Tripping	48:05	2:00
3rd	BC	Matt Greene	Hooking	49:54	2:00

Shots by period
Team	1	2	3	T
Notre Dame	5	8	8	21
Boston College	7	11	5	23

Goaltenders
Team	Name	Saves	Goals against	Time on ice
ND	Jordan Pearce	19	4	58:31
BC	John Muse	20	1	60:00

== Record by conference ==
Conference	# of Bids	Record	Win %	Regional Finals	Frozen Four	Championship Game	Champions
WCHA	6	3–6	.333	2	1	-	-
CCHA	4	7–4	.636	4	2	1	-
ECAC Hockey	2	1–2	.333	1	-	-	-
Hockey East	2	4–1	.800	1	1	1	1
Atlantic Hockey	1	0–1	.000	-	-	-	-
CHA	1	0–1	.000	-	-	-	-

== All-Tournament team ==
=== Frozen Four ===
- G: John Muse (Boston College)
- D: Michael Brennan (Boston College)
- D: Kyle Lawson (Notre Dame)
- F: Kevin Deeth (Notre Dame)
- F: Nathan Gerbe* (Boston College)
- F: Ben Smith (Boston College)

* Most Outstanding Player(s)
