= Carl Sneep =

American ice hockey player

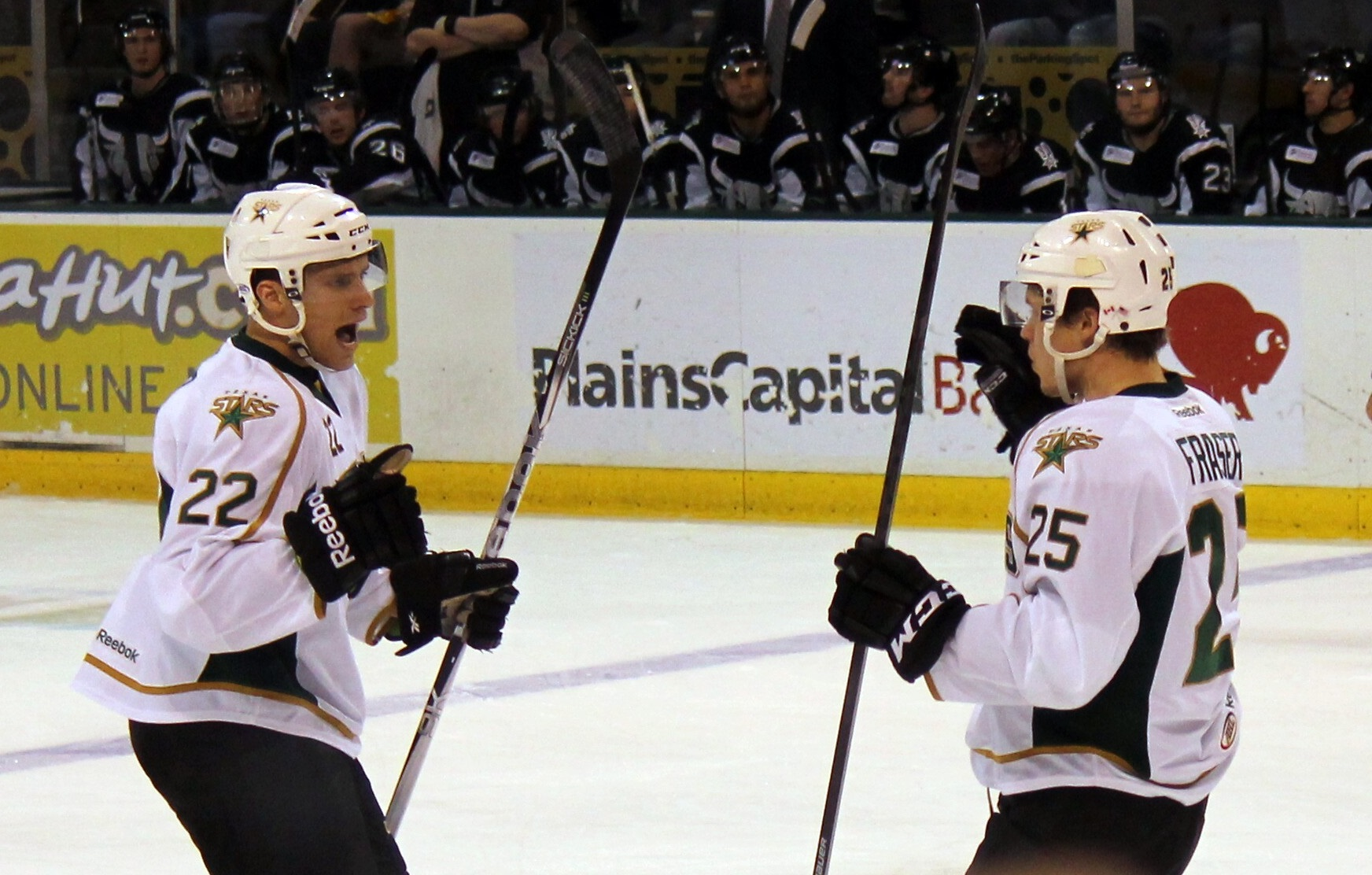
- Born: November 5, 1987 (age 38) Nisswa, Minnesota, U.S.
- Height: 6 ft 3 in (191 cm)
- Weight: 210 lb (95 kg; 15 st 0 lb)
- Position: Defense
- Shot: Right
- Played for: Pittsburgh Penguins
- NHL draft: 32nd overall, 2006; Pittsburgh Penguins
- Playing career: 2010–2013

Carl Michael Sneep (born November 5, 1987) is an American former professional ice hockey defenseman. He played in one National Hockey League (NHL) game with the Pittsburgh Penguins during the 2011–12 season.

== Playing career ==
Before attending Boston College, Sneep played for the Lincoln Stars of the USHL, based out of Lincoln, NE. He was selected by the Pittsburgh Penguins in the 2nd round (32nd overall) of the 2006 NHL entry draft. He played his first NHL game for the Penguins on December 17, 2011, against the Buffalo Sabres. During that game, he also recorded an assist, his first NHL point.

On January 24, 2013, Sneep was traded from the Penguins to the Dallas Stars in exchange for a conditional seventh-round draft pick.

On April 9, 2013, Sneep was traded from the Texas Stars to the Peoria Rivermen for Brett Sonne. Both players are considered to be loaned and remain property of their respective clubs. With no contract offer extended by the Stars after the season, Sneep was released as a free agent.

On August 27, 2013, Sneep agreed to a one-year contract with the ECHL club, the Idaho Steelheads. After thirteen games with the Steelheads, Sneep announced he was leaving the team with the intention of retiring from professional hockey. The Steelheads suspended Sneep indefinitely, which also secured his ECHL rights for the remainder of his contract. Sneep did not return to the Steelheads and is considered retired.

== Career statistics ==
			Regular season					Playoffs
Season	Team	League	GP	G	A	Pts	PIM	GP	G	A	Pts	PIM
2004–05	Brainerd High School	HSMN	26	20	21	41	25	—	—	—	—	—
2005–06	Brainerd High School	HSMN	26	14	23	37	34	—	—	—	—	—
2005–06	Lincoln Stars	USHL	13	1	3	4	9	9	0	1	1	6
2006–07	Boston College	HE	38	1	9	10	8	—	—	—	—	—
2007–08	Boston College	HE	44	3	12	15	15	—	—	—	—	—
2008–09	Boston College	HE	33	2	9	11	26	—	—	—	—	—
2009–10	Boston College	HE	42	11	17	28	26	—	—	—	—	—
2010–11	Wilkes–Barre/Scranton Penguins	AHL	61	4	13	17	39	2	0	0	0	0
2011–12	Wilkes–Barre/Scranton Penguins	AHL	40	0	10	10	26	—	—	—	—	—
2011–12	Pittsburgh Penguins	NHL	1	0	1	1	0	—	—	—	—	—
2012–13	Wilkes–Barre/Scranton Penguins	AHL	1	0	0	0	0	—	—	—	—	—
2012–13	Wheeling Nailers	ECHL	29	3	12	15	22	—	—	—	—	—
2012–13	Texas Stars	AHL	25	2	4	6	8	—	—	—	—	—
2012–13	Peoria Rivermen	AHL	6	0	0	0	2	—	—	—	—	—
2013–14	Idaho Steelheads	ECHL	13	1	2	3	13	—	—	—	—	—
AHL totals			133	6	27	33	77	2	0	0	0	0
NHL totals			1	0	1	1	0	—	—	—	—	—

== Awards and honors ==
Award	Year(s)
Hockey East Tournament Champion	2007, 2008, 2010
Hockey East All-Tournament Team	2008, 2010
NCAA National Champion	2008, 2010

== See also ==
- List of players who played only one game in the NHL
