= 2010 Hockey East men's ice hockey tournament =

2010 Hockey East Men's ice hockey tournament
- Dates: March 12–20, 2010
- Teams: 8
- Finals site: TD Garden; Boston, Massachusetts
- Champions: Boston College (9th title)
- Winning coach: Jerry York (7th title)
- MVP: Matt Lombardi (BC)
- Hockey East Men's Ice Hockey Tournaments

The 2010 Hockey East Men's Ice Hockey Tournament was the 26th tournament in the history of the conference. It was played between March 12 and March 20, 2010 at campus locations and at the TD Garden in Boston, Massachusetts. Boston College was awarded the Lamoriello Trophy and an automatic bid to the 2010 NCAA Division I Men's Ice Hockey Tournament.

== Format ==
The tournament featured three rounds of play. The teams that finish below eighth in the conference are not eligible for tournament play. In the first round, the first and eighth seeds, the second and seventh seeds, the third seed and sixth seeds, and the fourth seed and fifth seeds played a best-of-three with the winner advancing to the semifinals. In the semifinals, the highest and lowest seeds and second highest and second lowest seeds play a single-elimination game, with the winner advancing to the championship game. The tournament champion receives an automatic bid to the 2010 NCAA Division I Men's Ice Hockey Tournament.

== Regular season standings ==
Note: GP = Games played; W = Wins; L = Losses; T = Ties; PTS = Points; GF = Goals For; GA = Goals Against

2009–10 Hockey East standings
	Conference							Overall					
	GP	W	L	T	PTS	GF	GA	GP	W	L	T	GF	GA
#11 New Hampshire†	27	15	6	6	36	98	77	39	18	14	7	131	122
#1 Boston College*	27	16	8	3	35	99	61	42	29	10	3	171	104
Boston University	27	13	12	2	28	93	91	38	18	17	3	123	124
Maine	27	13	12	2	28	95	90	39	19	17	3	143	130
Massachusetts–Lowell	27	12	11	4	28	82	72	39	19	16	4	114	92
Merrimack	27	12	13	2	26	82	85	37	16	19	2	109	116
Massachusetts	27	13	14	0	26	72	86	36	18	18	0	105	117
Vermont	27	9	11	7	25	78	82	39	17	15	7	113	112
Northeastern	27	11	14	2	24	70	87	34	16	16	2	93	100
Providence	27	5	18	4	14	46	84	34	10	20	4	68	99
Championship: Boston College † indicates conference regular season champion * indicates conference tournament champion Final rankings: USA Today/USA Hockey Magazine Top 15 Poll

== Bracket ==
Quarterfinals; March 12–14
1	New Hampshire	7	0	0
8	Vermont	4	1	1*
2	Boston College	6	5	—
7	Massachusetts	5	2	—
(Pairings are reseeded after the first round)
3	Boston University	3	2	3
6	Merrimack	2	3*	0
4	Maine	1	2	3*
5	Massachusetts-Lowell	2	0	2

Semifinals; March 19
2	Boston College	3
8	Vermont	0
3	Boston University	2
4	Maine	5

Championship; March 20
2	Boston College	7*
4	Maine	6

Note: * denotes overtime periods

== Results ==
=== (1) New Hampshire vs. (8) Vermont ===
==== Game 1, March 12 ====
Scoring summary
Period	Team	Goal	Assist(s)	Time	Score
1st	UNH	Bobby Butler	Kessel and Campanale	6:16	1–0 UNH
1st	UVM	Drew MacKenzie	Higgins	13:09	1–1
1st	UVM	Jay Anctil	Nilsson-Roos	17:53	2–1 UVM
2nd	UNH	Nick Crates	LeBlanc	21:27	2–2
2nd	UVM	Josh Burrows	Roloff	24:03	3–2 UVM
2nd	UVM	Jonathan Higgins	McCarthy and Cullity	28:40	4–2 UVM
2nd	UNH	Mike Sislo	LeBlanc and Moses	30:05	4–3 UVM
3rd	UNH	Blake Kessel	Butler and DiSimone	40:38	4–4
3rd	UNH	Mike Sislo	LeBlanc and Moses	43:25	5–4 UNH
3rd	UNH	Bobby Butler	DiSimone and Thompson	44:08	6–4 UNH
3rd	UNH	Paul Thompson – EN	unassisted	58:58	7–4 UNH

Goaltenders
Team	Name	Saves	Goals against	Time on ice
UNH	Brian Foster	31	4	
UVM	Rob Madore	15	6	
UVM	John Vazzano	4	0	

==== Game 2, March 13 ====
Scoring summary
Period	Team	Goal	Assist(s)	Time	Score
1st	None				
2nd	None				
3rd	UVM	David Pacan	Higgins	45:16	1–0 UVM

Goaltenders
Team	Name	Saves	Goals against	Time on ice
UNH	Brian Foster	24	1	
UVM	Rob Madore	17	0	

==== Game 3, March 14 ====
Scoring summary
Period	Team	Goal	Assist(s)	Time	Score
1st	None				
2nd	None				
3rd	None				
Overtime	UVM	Jay Anctil	unassisted	75:52	1–0 UVM

Goaltenders
Team	Name	Saves	Goals against	Time on ice
UNH	Brian Foster	50	1	
UVM	Rob Madore	34	0	

=== (2) Boston College vs. (7) Massachusetts ===
==== Game 1, March 12 ====
Scoring summary
Period	Team	Goal	Assist(s)	Time	Score
1st	BC	Cam Atkinson	Whitney and Dumoulin	3:41	1–0 BC
1st	UMASS	Justin Braun – PPG	Marcou and Irwin	09:13	1–1
1st	BC	Cam Atkinson – PPG	Smith and Whitney	14:39	2–1 BC
2nd	UMASS	T.J Syner	Czepiel and Kublin	21:27	2–2
2nd	BC	Chris Kreider	Sneep and Cross	26:18	3–2 BC
2nd	BC	Barry Almeida	Price and Lombardi	27:11	4–2 BC
2nd	BC	Cam Atkinson – PPG	S. Whitney and J. Whitney	28:22	5–2 BC
2nd	UMASS	Casey Wellman – PPG	Marcou and Braun	37:15	5–3 BC
2nd	BC	Steven Whitney – PPG	Atkinson and J. Whitney	38:54	6–3 BC
3rd	UMASS	Martin Nolet	Czepiel and Syner	40:34	6–4 BC
3rd	UMASS	James Marcou	Wellman and Irwin	40:54	6–5 BC

Goaltenders
Team	Name	Saves	Goals against	Time on ice
UMASS	Paul Dainton	26	6	
BC	Parker Milner	33	5	

==== Game 2, March 13 ====
Scoring summary
Period	Team	Goal	Assist(s)	Time	Score
1st	BC	Barry Almeida	Matt Price	5:37	1–0 BC
1st	UMASS	Casey Wellman	Marcou and Braun	12:18	1–1
2nd	BC	Carl Sneep – SHG	Hayes and Almedia	32:42	2–1 BC
2nd	UMASS	Casey Wellman – PPG	Marcou and Braun	33:15	2–2
3rd	BC	Matt Lombardi	unassisted	42:11	3–2 BC
3rd	BC	Paul Carey	Whitney and Mullane	49:34	4–2 BC
3rd	BC	Barry Almedia – ENG	Hayes	59:37	5–2 BC

Goaltenders
Team	Name	Saves	Goals against	Time on ice
UMASS	Paul Dainton	22	4	
BC	John Muse	16	2	

=== (3) Boston University vs. (6) Merrimack ===
==== Game 1, March 12 ====
Scoring summary
Period	Team	Goal	Assist(s)	Time	Score
1st	MC	Pat Kimball	Moulakelis and Ross	08:44	1–0 MC
2nd	MC	Jeff Veleca	Barton	26:14	2–0 MC
2nd	BU	David Warsofsky	Cohen	30:10	2–1 MC
2nd	BU	Vinny Saponardi	Bonino and Warofsky	32:05	2–2
3rd	BU	Vinny Saponardi	unassisted	44:11	3–2 BU

Goaltenders
Team	Name	Saves	Goals against	Time on ice
MC	Joe Cannata	38	3	
BU	Kieran Millan	26	2	

==== Game 2, March 13 ====
Scoring summary
Period	Team	Goal	Assist(s)	Time	Score
1st	MC	Stephane Da Costa	Barton	11:30	1–0 MC
2nd	BU	Eric Gryba	Pereia and Popko	22:33	1–1
2nd	MC	Brandon Brodhag – PPG	Allan and Bowen	38:21	2–1 MC
3rd	BU	Wade Megan – PPG	Chiasson and Cohen	45:19	2–2
Overtime	MC	Joe Cucci	Flanigan and Brodhag	62:16	3–2 MC

Goaltenders
Team	Name	Saves	Goals against	Time on ice
MC	Joe Cannata	24	2	
BU	Kieran Millan	32	3	

==== Game 3, March 14 ====
Scoring summary
Period	Team	Goal	Assist(s)	Time	Score
1st	BU	Kevin Shattenkirk	Bonino	09:12	1–0 BU
1st	BU	Nick Bonino	Saponari and Shattenkirk	19:21	2–0 BU
2nd	None				
3rd	BU	Chris Connolly – PPG	Saponari and Bonino	57:08	3–0 BU

Goaltenders
Team	Name	Saves	Goals against	Time on ice
MC	Joe Cannata	27	3	
BU	Kieran Millan	34	0	

=== (4) Maine vs. (5) Massachusetts-Lowell ===
==== Game 1, March 12 ====
Scoring summary
Period	Team	Goal	Assist(s)	Time	Score
1st	Maine	Mark Nemec	Diamond and Abbott	05:00	1–0 Maine
1st	UML	Jeremy Dehner – PPG	Campbell and Whetmore	18:52	1–1
2nd	None				
3rd	UML	Ben Holmstrom	Blair and Falite	46:55	2–1 UML

Goaltenders
Team	Name	Saves	Goals against	Time on ice
UML	Carter Hutton	18	1	
Maine	Dave Wilson	19	2	

==== Game 2, March 13 ====
Scoring summary
Period	Team	Goal	Assist(s)	Time	Score
1st	Maine	Spencer Abbott	da Kastrozza and Van Dyk	00:23	1–0 Maine
2nd	Maine	Tanner House – PPG	Nyquist and Dee	32:45	2–0 Maine
3rd	None				

Goaltenders
Team	Name	Saves	Goals against	Time on ice
UML	Carter Hutton	28	2	
Maine	Dave Wilson	23	0	

==== Game 3, March 14 ====
Scoring summary
Period	Team	Goal	Assist(s)	Time	Score
1st	None				
2nd	UML	Colin Wright	Budd and Blair	5:48	1–0 UML
2nd	Maine	Will O'Neill – PPG	Nyquist and Flynn	13:44	1–1
3rd	UML	Scott Campbell – PPG	Vallorani and Wetmore	47:42	2–1 UML
3rd	Maine	Will O'Neill	Mangene and Nyquist	55:12	2–2
Overtime	Maine	Tanner House	Flynn and O'Neill	65:10	3–2 Maine

Goaltenders
Team	Name	Saves	Goals against	Time on ice
UML	Carter Hutton	33	3	
Maine	Dave Wilson	26	2	

=== Semifinals, March 19 ===
==== (2) Boston College vs. (8) Vermont ====
Scoring summary
Period	Team	Goal	Assist(s)	Time	Score
1st	BC	Chris Kreider	Hayes and Sneep	15:49	1–0 BC
2nd	BC	Ben Smith	Samuelsson and Hayes	39:52	2–0 BC
3rd	BC	Jimmy Hayes	Mullane and Kreider	43:06	3–0 BC

Goaltenders
Team	Name	Saves	Goals against	Time on ice
UVM	Rob Madore	28	2	
BC	John Muse	23	0	

==== (3) Boston University vs. (4) Maine ====
Scoring summary
Period	Team	Goal	Assist(s)	Time	Score
1st	Maine	Joey Diamond	Mangene and Shemansky	14:14	1–0 Maine
1st	Maine	Brian Flynn – PPG	Abott and de Kastrozza	18:46	2–0 Maine
2nd	Maine	Robby Dee	Nemec and Hegarty	27:00	3–0 Maine
3rd	BU	Kevin Shattenkirk	Bonino and Saponari	41:54	3–1 Maine
3rd	BU	Vinny Saponari – SH EAG	Shattenkirk and Bonino	56:13	3–2 Maine
3rd	Maine	David de Kastrozza – PPG	Van Dyk and Flynn	57:56	4–2 Maine
3rd	Maine	Tanner House – ENG	Abbott and Hegarty	58:08	5–2 Maine

Goaltenders
Team	Name	Saves	Goals against	Time on ice
BU	Kieran Millan	32	4	
Maine	Dave Wilson	22	2	

=== Championship, March 20 ===
==== (2) Boston College vs. (4) Maine ====
Scoring summary
Period	Team	Goal	Assist(s)	Time	Score
1st	BC	Carl Sneep – PPG	Mullane and Hayes	11:44	1–0 BC
1st	Maine	Gustav Nyquist	House and Flynn	12:08	1–1
1st	BC	Matt Lombardi	Kreider and Samuelsson	15:19	2–1 BC
1st	Maine	Joey Diamond	Dimmen and Mangene	15:55	2–2
2nd	BC	Joe Whitney – PPG	Atkinson and Gibbons	21:39	3–2 BC
2nd	BC	Matt Lombardi	Price and Dumoulin	25:35	4–2 BC
2nd	Maine	Tanner House – PPG	Nyquist and Diamond	35:04	4–3 BC
3rd	BC	Jimmy Hayes	Kreider and Smith	45:16	5–3 BC
3rd	Maine	David de Kastrozza – PPG	Shemansky	48:17	5–4 BC
3rd	BC	Barry Almeida	Lombardi and Gibbons	54:23	6–4 BC
3rd	Maine	Spencer Abbott	Dee	54:59	6–5 BC
3rd	Maine	Joey Diamond – EAG	House and Flynn	59:33	6–6
Overtime	BC	Matt Lombardi	Price and Dumoulin	65:25	7–6 BC

Goaltenders
Team	Name	Saves	Goals against	Time on ice
BC	John Muse	26	6	
Maine	Dave Wilson	27	7	

== Tournament awards ==
=== All-Tournament Team ===
- F Joey Diamond (Maine)
- F Matt Lombardi* (Boston College)
- F Gustav Nyquist (Maine)
- D Will O'Neill (Maine)
- D Carl Sneep (Boston College)
- G John Muse (Boston College)

* Tournament MVP(s)
