= John Muse =

American ice hockey goaltender (born 1988)

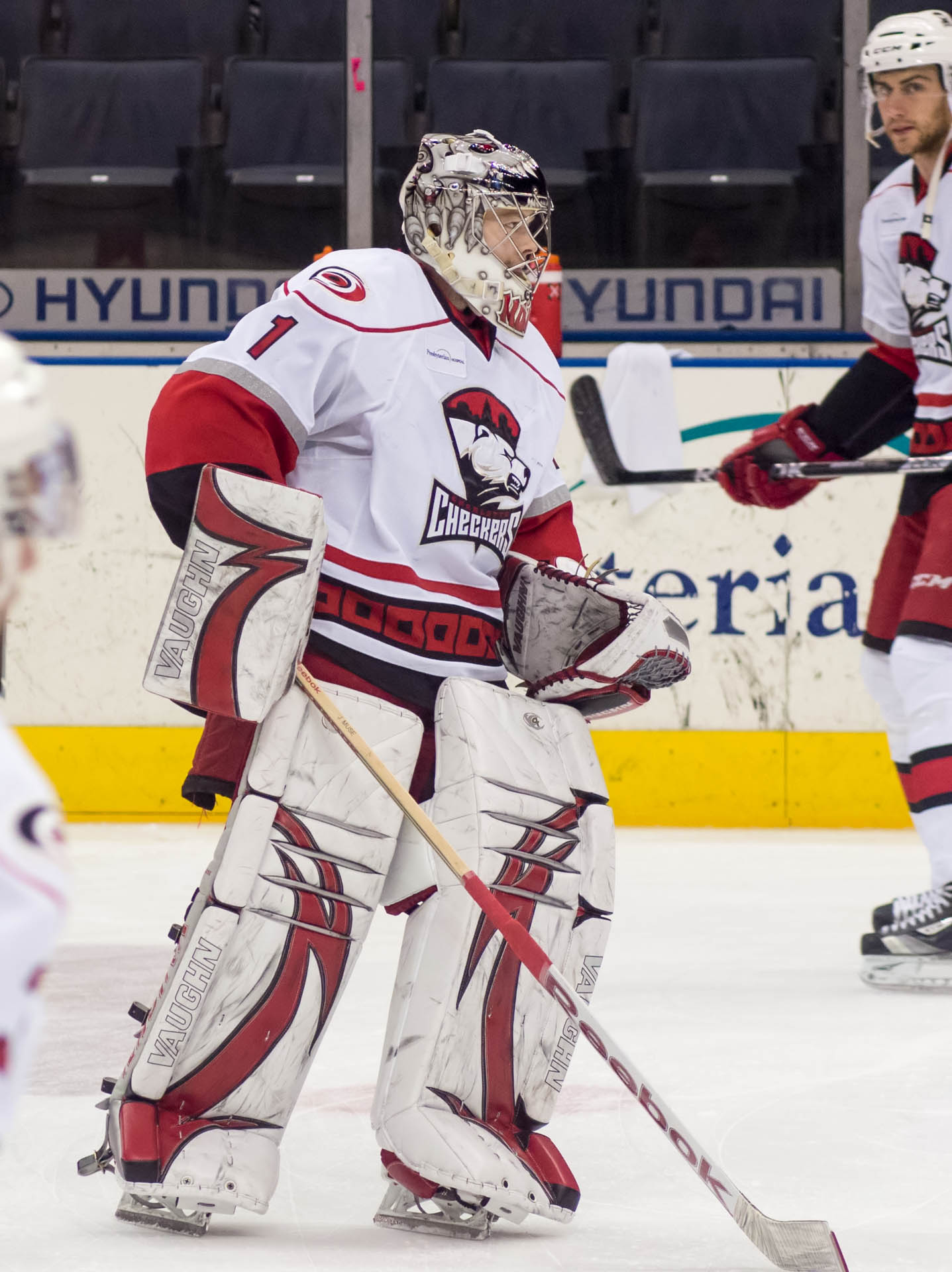
- Born: August 1, 1988 (age 38) East Falmouth, Massachusetts, U.S.
- Height: 5 ft 11 in (180 cm)
- Weight: 175 lb (79 kg; 12 st 7 lb)
- Position: Goaltender
- Caught: Left
- Played for: Portland Pirates; Charlotte Checkers; Texas Stars; Rochester Americans; Lehigh Valley Phantoms; WBS Penguins; Kunlun Red Star; Sheffield Steelers; Rødovre Mighty Bulls; Glasgow Clan; Worcester Railers
- NHL draft: Undrafted
- Playing career: 2011–2024

John Roger Muse (born August 1, 1988) is a goaltending coach with the China National Hockey Team. Muse was an American ice hockey goaltender who played professionally for a number of teams, including Rødovre Mighty Bulls in the Danish Metal Ligaen, the Wilkes-Barre/Scranton Penguins of the American Hockey League and the Worcester Railers of the ECHL.

== Playing career ==
=== Amateur ===
Muse grew up in Falmouth, Massachusetts and played high school hockey at Noble and Greenough School under the coaching of Brian Day. Muse led Nobles to Independent School League titles in 2004–05 and '05–06, and was named All-New England as a senior after compiling a 2.38 goals-against average and a .932 save percentage, with eight shutouts. He went on to play in college for the Boston College Eagles in the NCAA's Division I Hockey East conference.

Muse was a four-year player for Boston College, helping the Eagles to win the NCAA Division I National Championships in the 2007–2008 and 2009–2010 seasons, recording a 5–0 shutout against the Wisconsin Badgers in the 2010 National Championship game, becoming only the fourth goalie to do so in NCAA history.

Muse also backstopped for BC's Hockey East regular-season championship in 2010, as well as Beanpot Tournament and Hockey East tournament championships in 2008, 2010, and 2011. He finished his collegiate career with a record of 89–39–16, including 12 shutouts.

=== Professional ===
Following his college career, Muse was signed to an amateur tryout contract by the AHL's Portland Pirates, winning his only start for them. On July 18, 2011, Muse signed a two-way AHL deal with the Charlotte Checkers. He attended 2011 training camp with the NHL's Carolina Hurricanes, but was sent to Charlotte, then to Florida, for training camps.

Muse's first full professional season saw him spending time in both the ECHL and AHL, recording 15 games in Charlotte and 25 in Florida, where he shared netminding duties with Pat Nagle. Muse helped to lead Florida to their first Kelly Cup and their third Kelly Cup Final, recording a shutout win against Kalamazoo (7–0, with 32 saves), and the first 2/3 of a shutout against Elmira (5–0, Muse had 11 saves, but he did not play the 3rd period due to a lower-body injury). He was awarded the Kelly Cup MVP trophy following the Everblades victory in Game 5.

On June 7, 2012, Muse was signed to his first NHL contract with the Everblades parent affiliate, the Carolina Hurricanes, on a one-year contract. Due to the NHL lockout, Muse was directly returned initially to the Checkers, before splitting the year for a second consecutive season with the Everblades.

On August 6, 2013, with limited NHL interest, Muse signed as a free agent to remain in the ECHL with the Fort Wayne Komets. After starting the season on the Komet's roster, Muse was signed to a PTO by the Checkers due to injuries to Cam Ward and Anton Khudobin. In his first two starts for the Checkers, Muse recorded back to back 5–0 shutouts. By December, he had collected a record of 9–6–0 with a 2.29 GAA and .922 save percentage. As his PTO contract was nearing its end, the Checkers decided to extend an AHL deal to keep Muse in the organization through the end of the 2013–2014 season.

On August 4, 2015, Muse left the Checkers as a free agent to sign a one-year AHL contract with the Texas Stars. In the 2015–16 season, Muse assumed the backup role with the Stars, appearing in 19 games. Unable to replicate his form from previous years, Muse was traded by the Stars back to the Checkers for future considerations on February 29, 2016. After returning to Charlotte, Muse assumed the starting role for 18 of the remaining 21 games, collecting a 9–6–1 record with a 2.08 G.A.A. and .918 Sv. %. On March 14, 2016, Muse was named the AHL Player of the Week for the third time in his career.

On July 21, 2016, Muse continued his tenure in the AHL, signing a one-year contract as a free agent with the Rochester Americans. In the 2016–17 season, Muse appeared in 14 games with the Americans, collecting just 3 wins. He split the season in being assigned to the Elmira Jackals of the ECHL for 6 games.

As a free agent from the Americans, Muse signed with the Lehigh Valley Phantoms on a one-year deal on July 6, 2017. After appearing in 8 games with the Phantoms, and proving an adequate option, Muse was signed to a one-year, two-way contract with NHL affiliate, the Philadelphia Flyers, for the remainder of the 2017–18 season on February 26, 2018.

In the following off-season, Muse secured his second successive NHL contract, agreeing to a one-year, two-way contract with the Pittsburgh Penguins on July 1, 2018. In the following 2018–19 season, he split the year between Penguin affiliates, Wilkes-Barre/Scranton Penguins of the AHL and the Wheeling Nailers of the ECHL.

After spells with Kunlun Red Star, KRS-BSU and Danish club Rødovre Mighty Bulls, Muse signed for UK EIHL side Sheffield Steelers in March 2021, ahead of the 2021 Elite Series.

Muse rejoined Rodovre for the 2021-22 season. In October 2022, Muse returned to the UK to join Glasgow Clan.

On December 19, 2023, Muse signed an ECHL contract for the 2023-2024 season with the Worcester Railers. Muse made his season debut for the Railers on December 29, 2023 vs the Reading Royals. Muse stopped all 28 shots he faced while earning the shutout victory and first star of the game honors. Muse was named the ECHL Goaltender of the Week for December 27–31 after going 2-0-0 with one shutout, a 0.50 GAA and a .984 save percentage. This was the third time in Muse's career that he received ECHL Goaltender of the Week honors. Muse returned to the Railers for the 2024-2025 season, and split time with Michael Bullion, starting 10 games for the Railers before announcing his immediate retirement to the home crowd at the DCU Center in an on-ice interview following a 5-3 victory over the Reading Royals on December 28, 2024. In all, Muse played in 40 games for the Railers and averaged a 2.80 GAA and 0.909 save percentage. Muse earned a recall to the Bridgeport Islanders in the 2024-2025 season but did not dress in any games.

== Career statistics ==
			Regular season									Playoffs
Season	Team	League	GP	W	L	T/OT	MIN	GA	SO	GAA	SV%	GP	W	L	MIN	GA	SO	GAA	SV%
2007–08	Boston College	HE	44	25	11	8	2725	100	3	2.20	.921	—	—	—	—	—	—	—	—
2008–09	Boston College	HE	37	18	14	5	2248	102	3	2.72	.904	—	—	—	—	—	—	—	—
2009–10	Boston College	HE	29	19	8	2	1724	69	2	2.40	.910	—	—	—	—	—	—	—	—
2010–11	Boston College	HE	34	27	6	1	1954	75	4	2.30	.920	—	—	—	—	—	—	—	—
2010–11	Portland Pirates	AHL	1	1	0	0	65	2	0	1.85	.943	—	—	—	—	—	—	—	—
2011–12	Florida Everblades	ECHL	25	16	6	3	1489	60	1	2.42	.920	13	11	2	776	23	1	1.78	.939
2011–12	Charlotte Checkers	AHL	15	10	3	2	897	27	2	1.81	.941	—	—	—	—	—	—	—	—
2012–13	Florida Everblades	ECHL	21	9	8	4	1229	75	0	3.66	.884	—	—	—	—	—	—	—	—
2012–13	Charlotte Checkers	AHL	16	7	7	1	912	49	0	3.22	.891	1	0	0	27	1	0	2.26	.917
2013–14	Fort Wayne Komets	ECHL	1	0	0	1	65	3	0	2.77	.857	—	—	—	—	—	—	—	—
2013–14	Charlotte Checkers	AHL	47	27	18	0	2657	121	5	2.73	.915	—	—	—	—	—	—	—	—
2014–15	Charlotte Checkers	AHL	29	10	12	2	1612	72	0	2.68	.916	—	—	—	—	—	—	—	—
2015–16	Texas Stars	AHL	19	9	3	3	893	45	0	3.02	.904	—	—	—	—	—	—	—	—
2015–16	Charlotte Checkers	AHL	18	9	6	1	1010	35	0	2.08	.918	—	—	—	—	—	—	—	—
2016–17	Elmira Jackals	ECHL	6	2	2	2	366	17	0	2.78	.925	—	—	—	—	—	—	—	—
2016–17	Rochester Americans	AHL	14	3	8	0	741	38	1	3.08	.907	—	—	—	—	—	—	—	—
2017–18	Reading Royals	ECHL	26	19	5	0	1578	59	3	2.24	.931	4	0	4	328	11	0	2.02	.945
2017–18	Lehigh Valley Phantoms	AHL	15	11	2	1	853	35	1	2.46	.919	—	—	—	—	—	—	—	—
2018–19	Wheeling Nailers	ECHL	21	7	14	0	1235	70	1	3.40	.878	—	—	—	—	—	—	—	—
2018–19	Wilkes-Barre/Scranton Penguins	AHL	10	6	4	0	560	28	2	3.00	.906	—	—	—	—	—	—	—	—
2019–20	KRS-BSU	VHL	33	12	17	3	1896	80	2	2.53	.928	—	—	—	—	—	—	—	—
2019–20	Kunlun Red Star	KHL	1	0	0	0	32	2	0	3.79	.889	—	—	—	—	—	—	—	—
2020–21	Rødovre Mighty Bulls	Metal Ligaen	11	—	—	—	—	36	—	—	.898	—	—	—	—	—	—	—	—
2020–21	Sheffield Steelers	Elite Series	5	2	2	0	266	15	0	3.38	.878	—	—	—	—	—	—	—	—
2021–22	Rødovre Mighty Bulls	Metal Ligaen	21	2	8	0	1220	71	0	3.44	.900	—	—	—	—	—	—	—	—
2022–23	Glasgow Clan	EIHL	36	12	24	0	2070	112	1	3.25	.910	—	—	—	—	—	—	—	—
2023–24	Worcester Railers	ECHL	30	15	12	3	1774	82	2	2.77	.911	—	—	—	—	—	—	—	—
AHL totals			184	93	63	7	10,200	452	11	2.66	.914	1	0	0	27	1	0	2.26	.917

== Awards and honors ==
Award	Year
Hockey East All-Tournament Team	2008, 2010, 2011
All-NCAA All-Tournament Team	2008, 2010
All-Hockey East First Team	2010–11
AHCA East Second-Team All-American	2010–11

- 2012 Kelly Cup Playoffs MVP
- 2011 Recipient of the Walter Brown Award, given to New England's Best American-born Division I College Hockey Player
- 2011 Recipient of Boston College's "Outstanding Senior Male Scholar-Athlete Award."
- Named Beanpot Tournament MVP in 2010, playing in the classic college hockey tournament. Also awarded the 2010 Eberly trophy, given annually to the goalie with the best save percentage in the Beanpot tournament.
- 2007 co-winner of the Bernie Burke Outstanding Freshman Award
- Holds BC records in saves (3,696), games played (144), and single season saves. (1,171, 2007–2008)
- NCAA All Tournament Team 2008, 2010
- 3 time CCM/AHL Player of the Week: 2013-2014 (2), 2016
- 3 time CCM/ECHL Goaltender of the Week: 2017-2018 (2), 2023-2024

Awards and achievements
Preceded by Carter Hutton	Hockey East Goaltending Champion; 2010–11	Succeeded by Parker Milner
