= Nathan Gerbe =

American ice hockey player (born 1987)

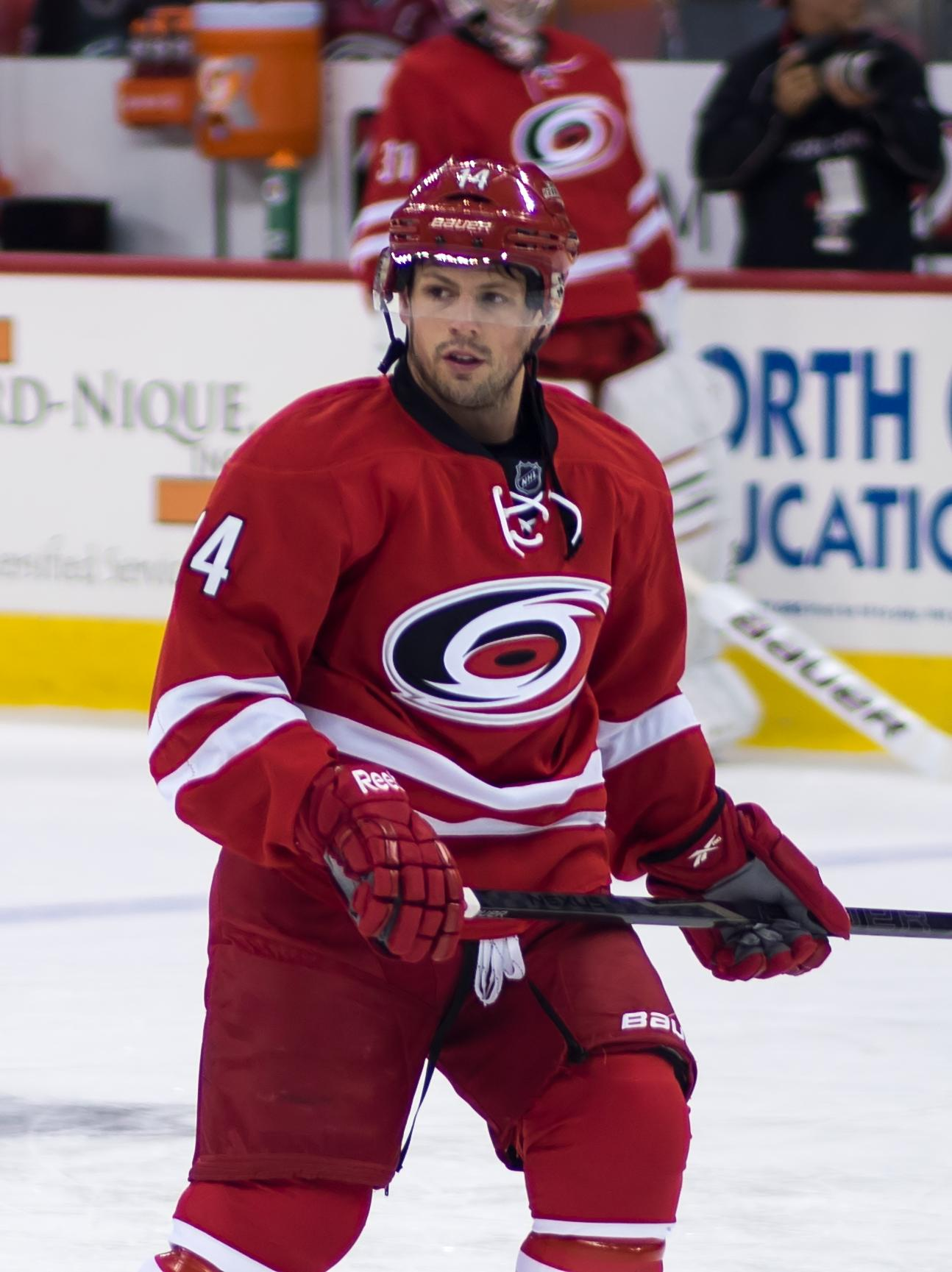
- Gerbe with the Carolina Hurricanes in 2013
- Born: July 24, 1987 (age 39) Oxford, Michigan, U.S.
- Height: 5 ft 4 in (163 cm)
- Weight: 176 lb (80 kg; 12 st 8 lb)
- Position: Center
- Shot: Left
- Played for: Buffalo Sabres; Carolina Hurricanes; Genève-Servette HC; Columbus Blue Jackets
- NHL draft: 142nd overall, 2005; Buffalo Sabres
- Playing career: 2008–2021

Nathan David Gerbe (born July 24, 1987) is an American former professional ice hockey player. Selected by the Buffalo Sabres in the fifth round (142nd overall) of the 2005 NHL entry draft, Gerbe played for the Sabres, Carolina Hurricanes and Columbus Blue Jackets during his National Hockey League (NHL) career. At 5 ft 4 in (1.63 m) tall, Gerbe is the shortest skater in NHL history, and the second shortest player in NHL history behind goaltender Roy Worters.

== Playing career ==
=== Amateur ===
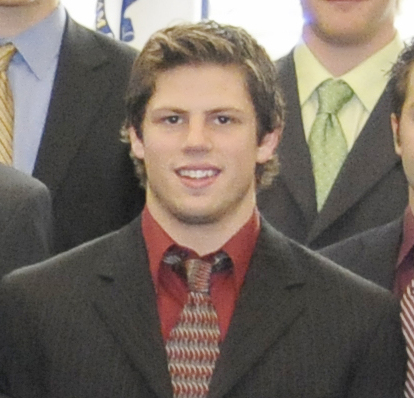
Gerbe in April 2008

As a youth, Gerbe played in the 2001 Quebec International Pee-Wee Hockey Tournament with the Detroit Honeybaked minor ice hockey team.

Gerbe played for the Boston College Eagles of the Hockey East conference in the NCAA, and was drafted by the Buffalo Sabres of the National Hockey League (NHL) with the 142nd pick in the 2005 NHL entry draft.

In the 2008 Frozen Four, he scored five goals in the final two games, leading his team to the championship, and was named the tournament's most outstanding player. He was also a finalist for the Hobey Baker Award in the 2007–08 season.

=== Professional ===
On May 6, 2008, Gerbe signed his first professional contract, a three-year, entry-level with the Buffalo Sabres. During his tenure with the Sabres, he was referred to as a "Tasmanian Devil," a reference to his smaller size, but rough style of play. In an interview, Gerbe revealed that he idolized NHL player Martin St. Louis who was also known for his small size and on-ice ability. He was assigned to the Portland Pirates, the Sabres' American Hockey League (AHL) affiliate, to start the 2008–09 season, but after the Sabres slumped early, on December 6, 2008, he was recalled by the team, playing in his first NHL regular season game, a 4–3 win over the Tampa Bay Lightning. On December 13, Gerbe recorded his first NHL point against the New Jersey Devils by assisting a Drew Stafford goal. Gerbe was returned to the Sabres AHL affiliate, the Portland Pirates, after six games. He was named to the 2009 AHL All-Star Classic, but could not play due to injury. He was awarded the Dudley "Red" Garrett Memorial Award for rookie of the year in the 2008–09 season of the AHL and finished with 30 goals and 56 points in 57 games. He was also named to the AHL All-Rookie Team.

Despite having a good training camp Gerbe was assigned to Portland to start the 2009–10 season. He scored his first career NHL goal on December 9, 2009, against the Washington Capitals. On December 30, it was announced that Gerbe had been named to the 2010 AHL All-Star Classic. He was recalled on March 28, 2010. After registering a goal and three points in eight games, on April 17, Gerbe was sent back to Portland to help the AHL team in their playoff run. On April 26, he scored his first NHL postseason goal in a 4–3 loss to the Boston Bruins, which eliminated the Sabres from the playoffs.

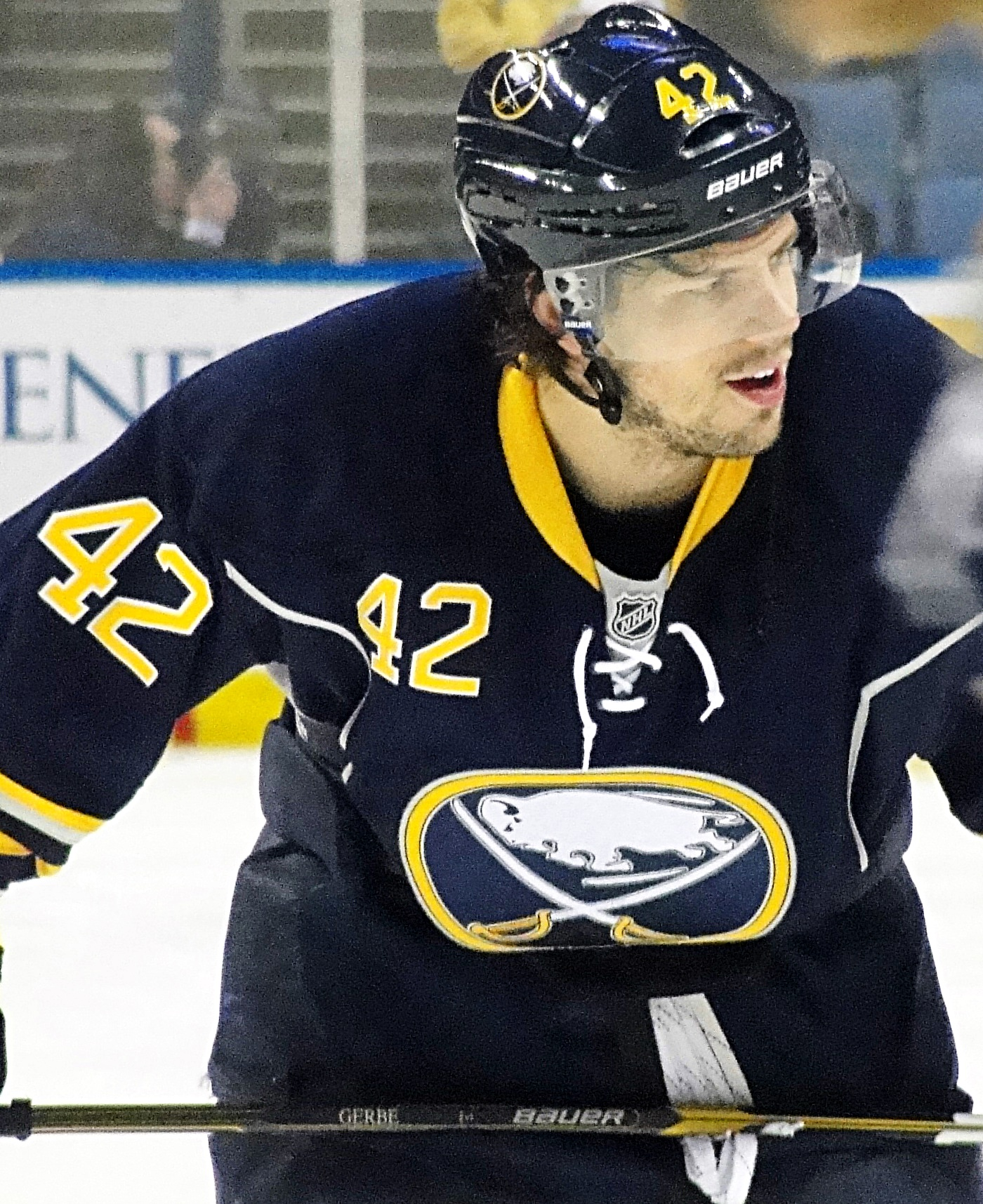
Gerbe with the Buffalo Sabres in 2012

Gerbe broke through as a regular for Sabres in the 2010–11 season, playing on the third and fourth lines. On January 21, 2011, he scored two goals in five seconds against the New York Islanders, setting a franchise record for the fastest two goals by one player. He scored the only two goals in a 2–0 win over the Montreal Canadiens on March 22. Gerbe finished the season playing in 64 games, scoring 16 goals and 31 points.

On June 29, 2011, Gerbe re-signed with the Buffalo Sabres to a three-year deal worth $1.42 million per season, avoiding salary arbitration. Gerbe's season was interrupted the following year by a hit from Marc-André Bourdon of the Philadelphia Flyers on December 8, where Gerbe was driven head-first into the boards. This caused him to miss time and he eventually required spinal surgery during the summer.

Upon completion of the lockout-shortened 2012–13 season, Gerbe was placed on waivers by the Sabres on July 3, 2013, with the intention of buying out the remainder of his contract. A free agent, Gerbe later agreed to a one-year, two-way contract with the Carolina Hurricanes on July 26. On June 24, 2014, Nathan Gerbe re-signed with the Hurricanes on a two-year, one-way contract.

On July 1, 2016, having left the Hurricanes as a free agent, Gerbe signed a one-year deal with the New York Rangers. However, Gerbe did not make the Rangers roster out of training camp and was sent down to the Rangers' AHL team, the Hartford Wolf Pack. When Gerbe refused to report to the Wolf Pack, the Rangers placed him on unconditional waivers for release in order to terminate his contract.

On October 14, 2016, Gerbe agreed to a three-year contract with Switzerland's Genève-Servette HC of the National League A (NLA). Gerbe made his NLA debut on October 21, on home-ice against HC Ambrì-Piotta. He scored his first NLA goal on October 29, on home-ice against HC Lugano in a 5–0 win. He finished his first season with 28 points (11 goals) in 26 games, before adding two assists in four playoffs games. Gerbe appeared in 13 regular season games with Genève-Servette HC in the 2017–18 season, scoring five points (one goal), before being taken out of the lineup as a healthy scratch. After an injury sustained during a team practice, Gerbe was put on the trade block by the team. He went on to play an additional six games, before being released on January 20, 2018, in order to get rid of his remaining SFr 1.3 million salary. In his playing time with Genève-Servette HC, he put up 35 points (13 goals) in 45 games, over two seasons.

On January 24, 2018, it was announced that the Columbus Blue Jackets signed Gerbe to a one-year, two-way contract for the rest of the 2017–18 season. After clearing waivers, Gerbe was assigned to the Cleveland Monsters of the AHL. However, after Markus Nutivaara was placed on injured reserve, Gerbe was called up to the NHL on February 21. He was reassigned to the Monsters a few days later on February 26, after recording no points in two games. In adding to the depth within the Blue Jackets organization, Gerbe agreed to a two-year, two-way contract extension on March 15.

Before the 2018–19 season, the Monsters named Gerbe team captain after going without one the previous season.

After 13 professional seasons in the National Hockey League (NHL), Gerbe announced his retirement on September 14, 2022. The same day he also announced he had joined the Nashville Predators organization as the club's forward development coach.

== Career statistics ==
=== Regular season and playoffs ===
			Regular season					Playoffs
Season	Team	League	GP	G	A	Pts	PIM	GP	G	A	Pts	PIM
2002–03	River City Lancers	USHL	25	3	3	6	49	7	1	1	2	2
2003–04	U.S. NTDP U17	USDP	32	14	12	26	66	—	—	—	—	—
2003–04	U.S. NTDP U18	NAHL	26	11	7	18	87	—	—	—	—	—
2004–05	U.S. NTDP U18	USDP	26	6	11	17	48	—	—	—	—	—
2004–05	U.S. NTDP U18	NAHL	12	7	5	12	25	—	—	—	—	—
2005–06	Boston College	HE	39	11	7	18	75	—	—	—	—	—
2006–07	Boston College	HE	41	25	22	47	76	—	—	—	—	—
2007–08	Boston College	HE	43	35	33	68	65	—	—	—	—	—
2008–09	Portland Pirates	AHL	57	30	26	56	63	5	0	0	0	4
2008–09	Buffalo Sabres	NHL	10	0	1	1	4	—	—	—	—	—
2009–10	Portland Pirates	AHL	44	11	27	38	46	4	1	1	2	4
2009–10	Buffalo Sabres	NHL	10	2	3	5	4	2	1	1	2	0
2010–11	Buffalo Sabres	NHL	64	16	15	31	34	7	2	0	2	18
2011–12	Buffalo Sabres	NHL	62	6	19	25	32	—	—	—	—	—
2012–13	Buffalo Sabres	NHL	42	5	5	10	14	—	—	—	—	—
2013–14	Carolina Hurricanes	NHL	81	16	15	31	36	—	—	—	—	—
2014–15	Carolina Hurricanes	NHL	78	10	18	28	34	—	—	—	—	—
2015–16	Carolina Hurricanes	NHL	47	3	4	7	14	—	—	—	—	—
2016–17	Genève–Servette HC	NLA	26	11	17	28	22	4	0	2	2	2
2017–18	Genève–Servette HC	NL	19	2	5	7	85	—	—	—	—	—
2017–18	Cleveland Monsters	AHL	24	4	14	18	16	—	—	—	—	—
2017–18	Columbus Blue Jackets	NHL	2	0	0	0	0	—	—	—	—	—
2018–19	Cleveland Monsters	AHL	41	10	22	32	69	—	—	—	—	—
2019–20	Cleveland Monsters	AHL	30	8	17	25	22	—	—	—	—	—
2019–20	Columbus Blue Jackets	NHL	30	4	6	10	22	2	0	0	0	0
2020–21	Columbus Blue Jackets	NHL	9	1	2	3	2	—	—	—	—	—
2020–21	Cleveland Monsters	AHL	13	4	6	10	36	—	—	—	—	—
NHL totals			435	63	88	151	196	11	3	1	4	18

=== International ===
Medal record

Representing United States

Ice hockey

World Junior Championships
Bronze medal – third place	2007 Mora	

IIHF U18 Championships
Gold medal – first place	2005 České Budějovice	
Silver medal – second place	2004 Minsk	

Year	Team	Event	Result	GP	G	A	Pts	PIM
2004	United States	U17	4th	5	5	5	10	4
2004	United States	WJC18	2nd place, silver medalist(s)	6	0	2	2	20
2005	United States	WJC18	1st place, gold medalist(s)	6	4	4	8	14
2006	United States	WJC	4th	7	0	0	0	6
2007	United States	WJC	3rd place, bronze medalist(s)	7	0	6	6	2
Junior totals				31	9	17	26	46

== Awards and honors ==
Award	Year
College
All-Hockey East Second Team	2006–07
All-NCAA All-Tournament Team	2007, 2008
All-Hockey East First Team	2007–08
AHCA East First-Team All-American	2007–08
Hockey East All-Tournament Team	2008

Awards and achievements
Preceded by T. J. Hensick	NCAA Ice Hockey Scoring Champion; 2007–08	Succeeded by Bryan Leitch
Preceded by Brock Bradford	William Flynn Tournament Most Valuable Player; 2008	Succeeded by Kieran Millan
Preceded by Justin Abdelkader	NCAA Tournament Most Outstanding Player; 2008	Succeeded by Colby Cohen
Preceded by Teddy Purcell	AHL Rookie of the Year; 2008–09	Succeeded by Tyler Ennis
