= Michael Brennan (ice hockey) =

American ice hockey player

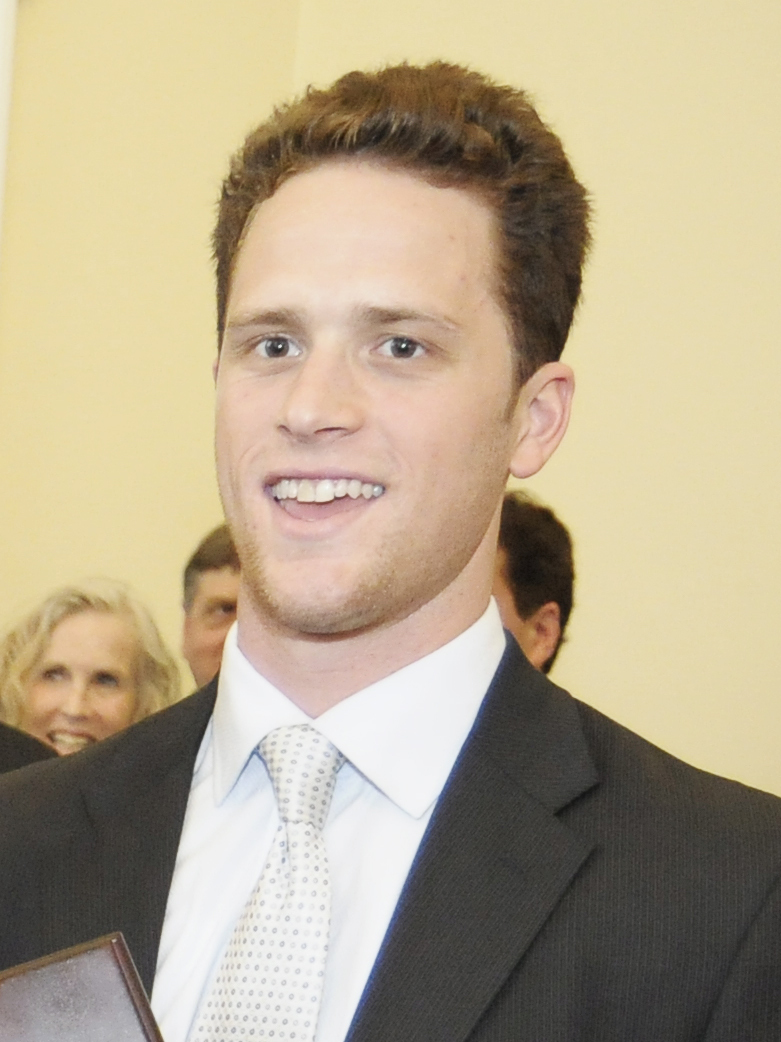
- Brennan in 2008
- Born: January 24, 1986 (age 40) Smithtown, New York, U.S.
- Height: 6 ft 0 in (183 cm)
- Weight: 205 lb (93 kg; 14 st 9 lb)
- Position: Defense
- Shot: Right
- Played for: Rockford IceHogs; Toronto Marlies; Lake Erie Monsters; Worcester Sharks; Iserlohn Roosters; Sport
- NHL draft: Undrafted
- Playing career: 2008–2016

Michael Brennan (born January 24, 1986) is an American former professional ice hockey defenseman who most notably played in the American Hockey League (AHL).

== Playing career ==
Brennan was a member of U.S. National Under-18 Team for two seasons (2002–04). He played four seasons (2004–08) at Boston College. In 2008 Breannan was named to the NCAA Championship All-Tournament Team.

On April 16, 2010, Brennan was signed as a free agent by the Chicago Blackhawks, and he spent two seasons (2008–10) in the AHL with Chicago's top farm team – the Rockford IceHogs.

He was invited to the Toronto Maple Leafs 2010–11 Training camp, and on September 26, 2010, he was assigned to the Maple Leafs AHL affiliate, the Toronto Marlies. After recording a career high 10 points, Brennan was signed to an AHL contract with the Lake Erie Monsters for the 2011–12 season.

Prior to the commencement of the season with the Monsters, Brennan was invited to and participated in the Monsters NHL affiliate, Colorado Avalanche training camp. Upon his return to the Monsters, Brennan was a main fixture on the blueline appearing in a career high 74 games.

A free agent into the 2012–13 season, and now classified as a veteran, Brennan belatedly signed a contract with the Florida Everblades of the ECHL on November 5, 2012. After 9 games with the Everblades, Brennan made a return to the AHL, when he was loaned to the Worcester Sharks on November 27, 2009. He made his eventful debut for the Sharks on November 30, against the Portland Pirates. Brennan recorded 4 assists in 28 games before he was sideline by injury for the duration of the season.

On June 21, 2013, after 310 games in the AHL, Brennan signed his first European deal; a one-year contract with the German club Iserlohn Roosters of the Deutsche Eishockey Liga (DEL). In the 2013–14 season with the Roosters, Brennan was a mainstay on the Blueline in appearing in 51 games and producing 1 goal and 7 points.

After a second round exit in the post-season, Brennan was not retained by the Roosters and on September 30, 2014, Brennan accepted a try-out contract into the 2014–15 season, with Finnish club Sport in the Liiga.

== Career statistics ==
=== Regular season and playoffs ===
			Regular season					Playoffs
Season	Team	League	GP	G	A	Pts	PIM	GP	G	A	Pts	PIM
2002–03	U.S. National Under-18 Team	NAHL	44	1	1	3	89	—	—	—	—	—
2003–04	U.S. National Under-18 Team	NAHL	11	2	3	5	19	—	—	—	—	—
2004–05	Boston College Eagles	HE	40	2	6	8	46	—	—	—	—	—
2005–06	Boston College Eagles	HE	42	2	10	12	95	—	—	—	—	—
2006–07	Boston College Eagles	HE	42	0	11	11	89	—	—	—	—	—
2007–08	Boston College Eagles	HE	44	2	5	8	52	—	—	—	—	—
2008–09	Rockford IceHogs	AHL	64	0	6	6	77	2	0	0	0	2
2009–10	Rockford IceHogs	AHL	72	3	6	9	113	3	0	0	0	0
2010–11	Toronto Marlies	AHL	72	3	7	10	110	—	—	—	—	—
2011–12	Lake Erie Monsters	AHL	74	0	7	7	106	—	—	—	—	—
2012–13	Florida Everblades	ECHL	9	0	1	1	13	—	—	—	—	—
2012–13	Worcester Sharks	AHL	28	0	4	4	26	—	—	—	—	—
2013–14	Iserlohn Roosters	DEL	51	1	6	7	76	9	0	1	1	14
2014–15	Sport	Liiga	51	7	7	14	129	—	—	—	—	—
2015–16	Sport	Liiga	46	2	3	5	40	—	—	—	—	—
AHL totals			310	6	24	30	355	5	0	0	0	2

=== International ===
Medal record

Representing United States

Ice hockey

IIHF U18 Championships
Silver medal – second place	2004 Minsk	

Year	Team	Event	Result	GP	G	A	Pts	PIM
2004	United States	U18	2nd place, silver medalist(s)	6	0	1	1	16
Junior totals				6	0	1	1	16

== Awards and honors ==
Award	Year(s)
Hockey East All-Tournament Team	2008
All-NCAA All-Tournament Team	2008
