= Benn Ferriero =

American ice hockey player (born 1987)

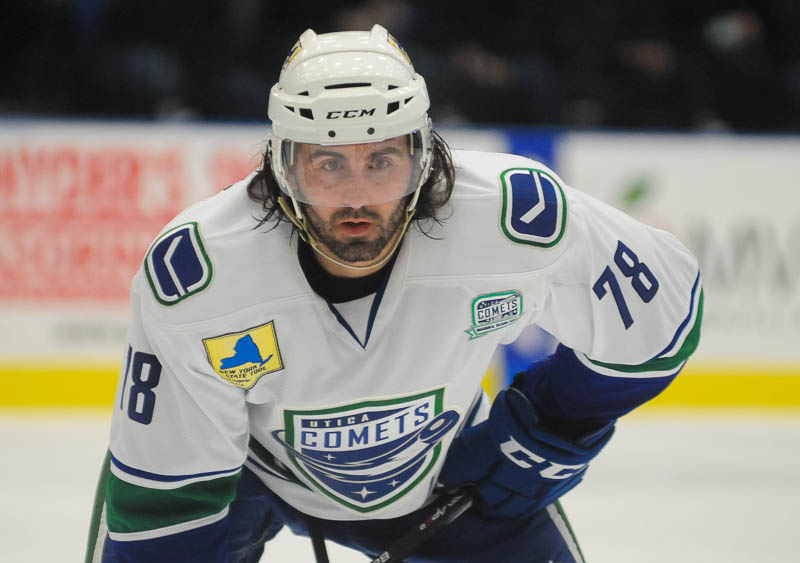
- Ferriero with the Utica Comets in 2014
- Born: April 29, 1987 (age 39) Boston, Massachusetts, U.S.
- Height: 5 ft 11 in (180 cm)
- Weight: 195 lb (88 kg; 13 st 13 lb)
- Position: Center
- Shot: Right
- Played for: San Jose Sharks; New York Rangers; Vancouver Canucks; EC Red Bull Salzburg
- NHL draft: 196th overall, 2006; Phoenix Coyotes
- Playing career: 2009–2016

Benn Trevor Ferriero (born April 29, 1987) is an American former professional ice hockey center. He played in the National Hockey League (NHL) with the San Jose Sharks, New York Rangers and the Vancouver Canucks. Ferriero was born in Boston, Massachusetts, but grew up in Essex, Mass.

== Playing career ==
=== Amateur ===
As a youth, Ferriero played in the 2001 Quebec International Pee-Wee Hockey Tournament with the Middlesex Islanders minor ice hockey team.

Ferriero attended high school at Governor Dummer Academy in Byfield, Massachusetts, graduating in 2005. He played collegiate hockey at Boston College for four seasons from 2005 to 2009. After scoring 25 points in 42 games in his freshman season, Ferriero was drafted in the seventh round of the 2006 NHL entry draft, 196th overall by the Phoenix Coyotes. However, the Coyotes did not sign Ferriero upon completing his college career.

=== Professional ===
Ferriero was signed as a free agent by the San Jose Sharks on September 1, 2009. After a pre-season during which he scored five points, Ferriero made his NHL debut exactly one month later against the Colorado Avalanche. He scored his first NHL goal during the second game of the season on October 3 against Jonas Hiller of the Anaheim Ducks.

On his 24th birthday, and in his first Stanley Cup playoff appearance, Ferriero scored the game-winning goal (and his first career playoff goal) in overtime against the Detroit Red Wings in Game 1 of the Western Conference Semifinals of the 2011 playoffs.

On July 13, 2012, the Pittsburgh Penguins signed Ferriero to a one-year, two-way contract. Due to the 2012–13 NHL lockout, however, Ferriero was directly assigned to the team's American Hockey League (AHL) affiliate, the Wilkes-Barre/Scranton Penguins, to start the 2012–13 season. On January 24, 2013, Ferriero was traded from the Penguins to the New York Rangers in exchange for Chad Kolarik. He was later recalled from the Connecticut Whale and appeared in four games for the Rangers.

On June 30, 2013, Ferriero's rights were traded by the Rangers to the Minnesota Wild in exchange for Justin Falk. It was later announced that the Wild would not tender Ferriero a contract, releasing him as a free agent.

On July 11, 2013, Ferriero was signed to a one-year contract by the Vancouver Canucks. Ferriero spent the majority of the 2013–14 season, with the Canucks' AHL affiliate, the Utica Comets, before appearing in two games with Vancouver.

On July 16, 2014, Ferriero was signed as a free agent to a one-year, two-way contract by the St. Louis Blues. He was assigned to their AHL affiliate, the Chicago Wolves, for the duration of the 2014–15 season.

Ferriero left the NHL in the off-season, signing a one-year contract with Austrian club EC Red Bull Salzburg of the Austrian Hockey League (EBEL) on June 9, 2015. After 23 appearances for Salzburg, Ferriero opted to return to North America, signing a professional try-out with hometown club, the Providence Bruins of the AHL on December 17, 2016.

== International play ==
Ferriero earned a gold medal as part of the United States team at the 2005 IIHF World U18 Championships in the Czech Republic.

== Personal life ==
In the 2010 NHL entry draft, the Sharks drafted Benn's younger brother Cody in the fifth round, 127th overall.

== Career statistics ==
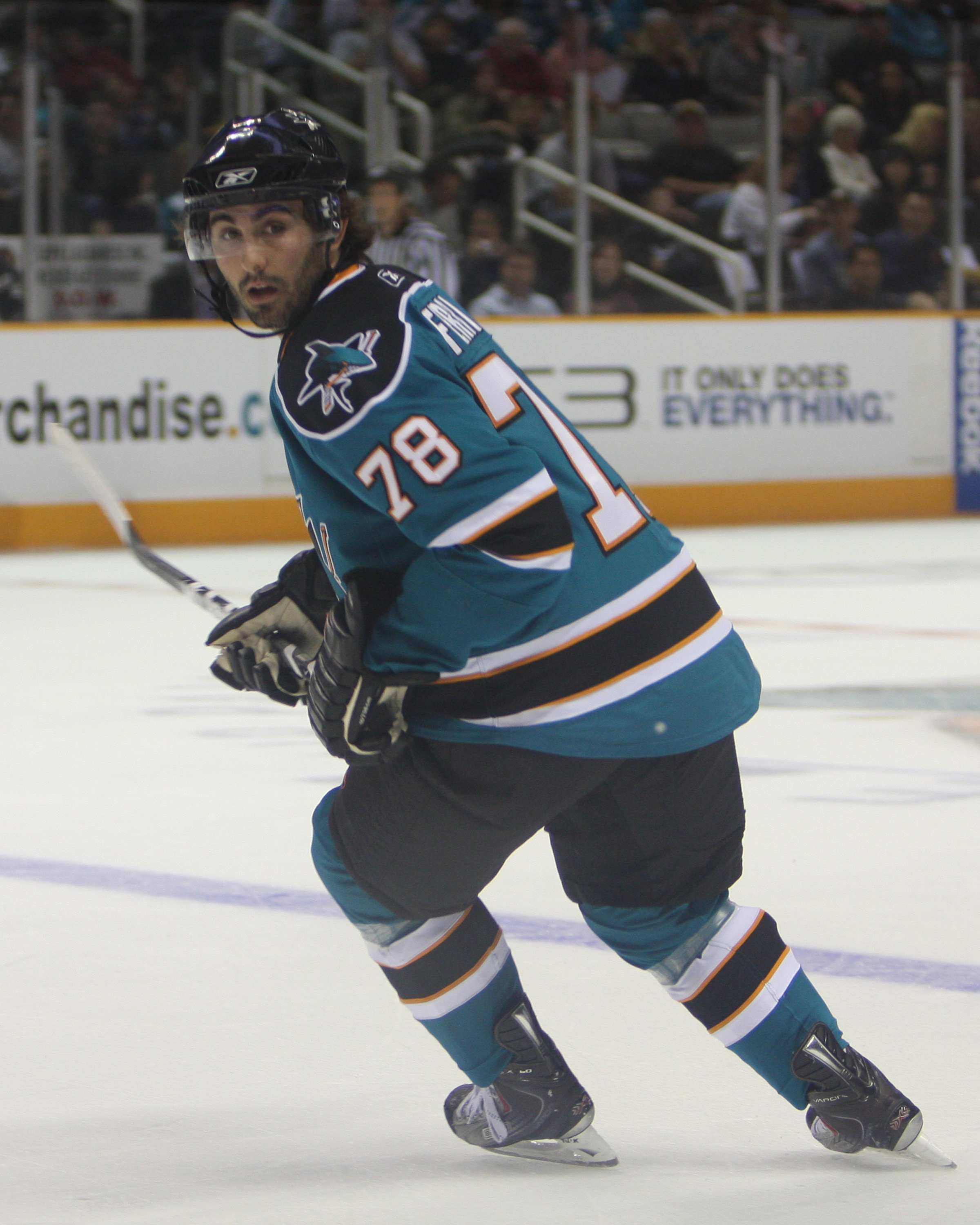
Ferriero with the San Jose Sharks in 2009

=== Regular season and playoffs ===
			Regular season					Playoffs
Season	Team	League	GP	G	A	Pts	PIM	GP	G	A	Pts	PIM
2002–03	The Governor's Academy	HS Prep	26	8	10	18		—	—	—	—	—
2003–04	The Governor's Academy	HS Prep	28	19	24	43		—	—	—	—	—
2004–05	The Governor's Academy	HS Prep	28	15	27	42		—	—	—	—	—
2004–05	US NTDP U18	USDP	10	2	8	10	6	—	—	—	—	—
2005–06	Boston College	HE	42	16	9	25	36	—	—	—	—	—
2006–07	Boston College	HE	42	23	23	46	43	—	—	—	—	—
2007–08	Boston College	HE	44	17	25	42	71	—	—	—	—	—
2008–09	Boston College	HE	37	8	18	26	44	—	—	—	—	—
2009–10	San Jose Sharks	NHL	24	2	3	5	8	—	—	—	—	—
2009–10	Worcester Sharks	AHL	58	19	31	50	20	11	4	2	6	4
2010–11	Worcester Sharks	AHL	43	16	17	33	16	—	—	—	—	—
2010–11	San Jose Sharks	NHL	33	5	4	9	9	8	1	0	1	6
2011–12	Worcester Sharks	AHL	20	9	11	20	18	—	—	—	—	—
2011–12	San Jose Sharks	NHL	35	7	1	8	8	—	—	—	—	—
2012–13	Wilkes–Barre/Scranton Penguins	AHL	34	4	14	18	14	—	—	—	—	—
2012–13	Connecticut Whale	AHL	23	4	8	12	17	—	—	—	—	—
2012–13	New York Rangers	NHL	4	0	1	1	0	—	—	—	—	—
2013–14	Utica Comets	AHL	54	19	20	39	42	—	—	—	—	—
2013–14	Vancouver Canucks	NHL	2	0	0	0	0	—	—	—	—	—
2014–15	Chicago Wolves	AHL	39	2	5	7	12	2	1	0	1	0
2015–16	EC Red Bull Salzburg	AUT	23	4	2	6	4	—	—	—	—	—
2015–16	Providence Bruins	AHL	7	0	0	0	0	—	—	—	—	—
NHL totals			98	14	9	23	25	8	1	0	1	6
AHL totals			278	73	106	179	139	13	5	2	7	4

=== International ===
Year	Team	Event	Result	GP	G	A	Pts	PIM
2005	United States	WJC18	1st place, gold medalist(s)	6	1	3	4	4
Junior totals				6	1	3	4	4

== Awards and honors ==
Award	Year
College
All-Hockey East Rookie Team	2005–06
Hockey East All-Tournament Team	2007, 2008
