= Nick Petrecki =

American ice hockey player (born 1989)

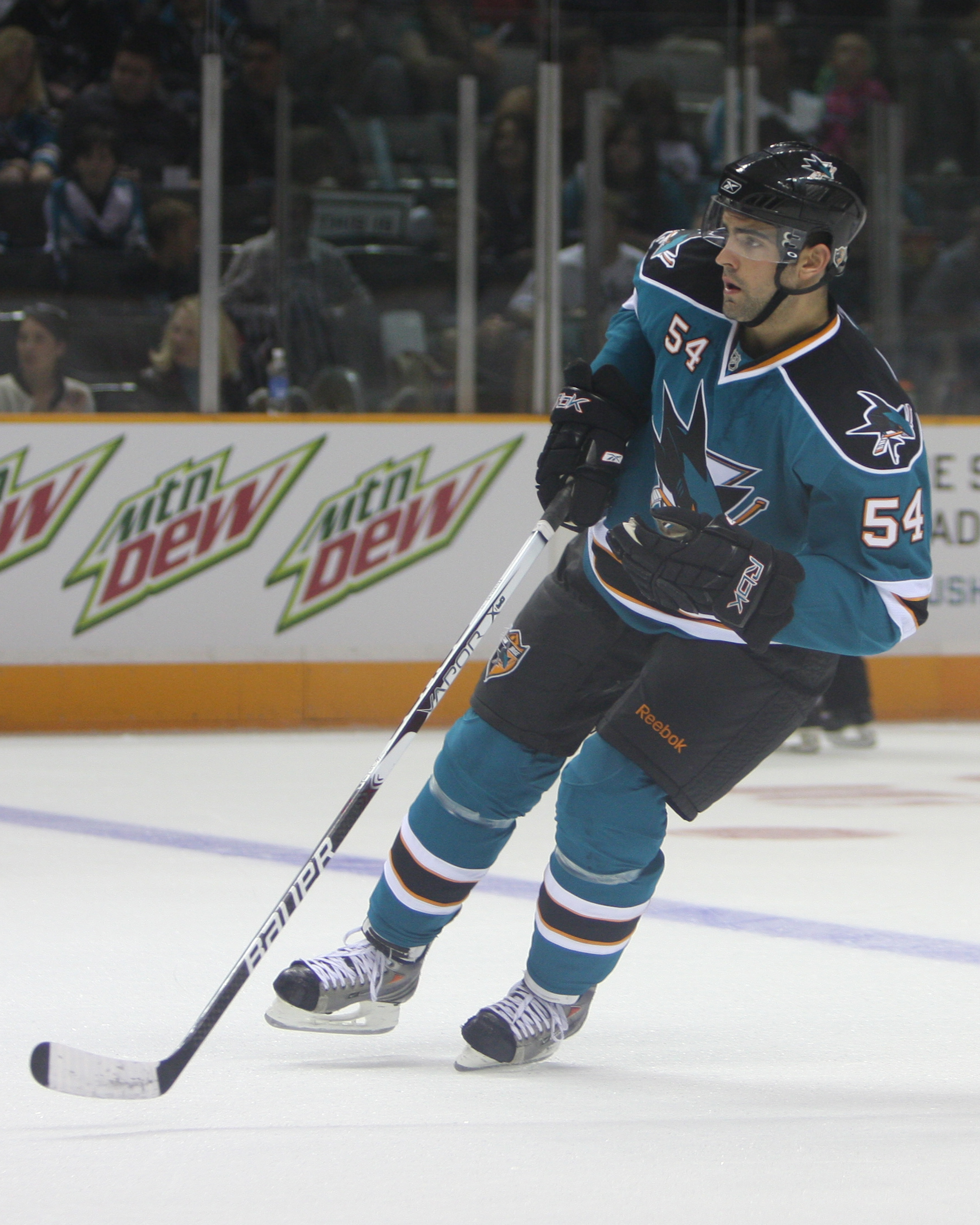
- Petrecki with the San Jose Sharks in 2009
- Born: July 11, 1989 (age 37) Clifton Park, New York, U.S.
- Height: 6 ft 3 in (191 cm)
- Weight: 214 lb (97 kg; 15 st 4 lb)
- Position: Defense
- Shot: Left
- Played for: San Jose Sharks
- NHL draft: 28th overall, 2007; San Jose Sharks
- Playing career: 2009–2016

Nicholas Griffin Petrecki (born July 11, 1989) is an American former professional ice hockey defenseman. He played one game with the San Jose Sharks in the National Hockey League (NHL) during the 2012–13 season.

== Playing career ==
Petrecki played two seasons with the Omaha Lancers of the USHL before being selected 28th overall by the San Jose Sharks in the 2007 NHL entry draft. Previous to his seasons with the lancers he played with the CD Selects of the EJHL. Petrecki also played youth hockey for Clifton Park Youth Hockey Association (Eagles) and Troy Albany Youth Hockey Association.

He played NCAA Hockey with the Boston College Eagles, who won the NCAA Men's Ice Hockey Championship title in his first season with the team (2007–2008). During his time at BC he became well known for his strong defense as well as his heavy hits. He was known as the enforcer for BC's team, leading the Eagles in penalty minutes from 2007–2009. He also notably received a game misconduct for headbutting a University of Maine player in a game at Conte Forum. Additionally, he chipped in on offense, scoring two goals including the overtime game winner in BC's 2008 Beanpot Championship Game victory over Harvard, and scoring a goal to help push BC to a comeback victory over the Miami RedHawks in the 2008 NCAA Tournament.

On March 30, 2009, Petrecki signed an NHL contract with the San Jose Sharks and was assigned to the Worcester Sharks (AHL).

During the 2013–14 season, his fifth with the Worcester Sharks, Petrecki was reassigned on loan by San Jose to fellow AHL club, the Rochester Americans on March 12, 2014.

On August 19, 2014, he opted to continue his career with the Amerks in signing as a free agent to a one-year AHL contract.

== Career statistics ==
			Regular season					Playoffs
Season	Team	League	GP	G	A	Pts	PIM	GP	G	A	Pts	PIM
2003–04	Capital District Selects	EJHL	37	2	15	17	87	—	—	—	—	—
2004–05	Capital District Selects	EJHL	53	5	18	23	159	—	—	—	—	—
2005–06	Omaha Lancers	USHL	53	0	3	3	110	5	0	0	0	0
2006–07	Omaha Lancers	USHL	54	11	14	25	177	5	0	0	0	10
2007–08	Boston College	HE	42	5	7	12	102	—	—	—	—	—
2008–09	Boston College	HE	35	0	7	7	161	—	—	—	—	—
2009–10	Worcester Sharks	AHL	65	2	12	14	106	—	—	—	—	—
2010–11	Worcester Sharks	AHL	67	3	11	14	129	—	—	—	—	—
2011–12	Worcester Sharks	AHL	68	1	8	9	107	—	—	—	—	—
2012–13	Worcester Sharks	AHL	42	1	5	6	135	—	—	—	—	—
2012–13	San Jose Sharks	NHL	1	0	0	0	0	—	—	—	—	—
2013–14	Worcester Sharks	AHL	35	1	2	3	54	—	—	—	—	—
2013–14	Rochester Americans	AHL	14	0	1	1	28	5	0	0	0	2
2014–15	Rochester Americans	AHL	19	0	2	2	56	—	—	—	—	—
2015–16	Elmira Jackals	ECHL	14	0	6	6	20	—	—	—	—	—
2015–16	Hartford Wolf Pack	AHL	3	0	0	0	10	—	—	—	—	—
2015–16	Indy Fuel	ECHL	31	4	7	11	75	—	—	—	—	—
2015–16	Chicago Wolves	AHL	3	0	0	0	7	—	—	—	—	—
AHL totals			316	8	41	49	632	5	0	0	0	2
NHL totals			1	0	0	0	0	—	—	—	—	—

Awards and achievements
Preceded by Logan Couture	San Jose Sharks first-round draft pick 2007	Succeeded by Charlie Coyle
