= Joe Whitney =

American ice hockey forward (born 1988)

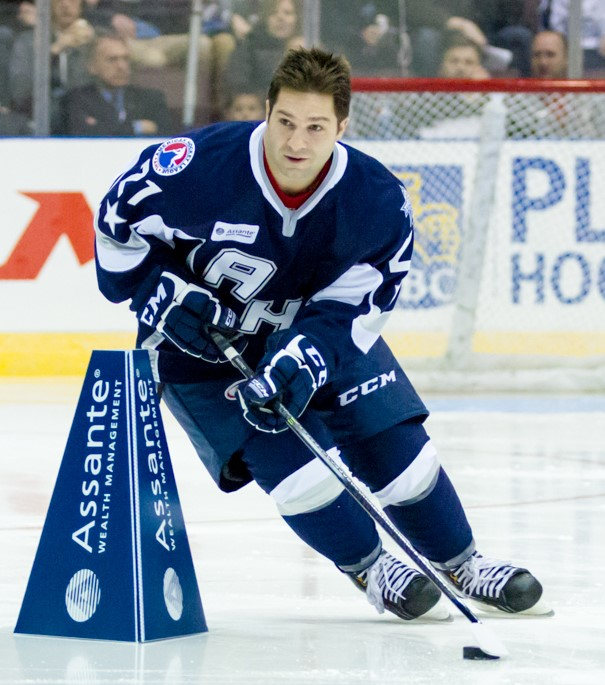
- Whitney at the 2014 AHL All-Star Game
- Born: February 6, 1988 (age 38) Reading, Massachusetts, U.S.
- Height: 5 ft 6 in (168 cm)
- Weight: 165 lb (75 kg; 11 st 11 lb)
- Position: Left wing
- Shot: Left
- Played for: New Jersey Devils; Linköping HC; Iserlohn Roosters
- NHL draft: Undrafted
- Playing career: 2011–2022

Joseph Ryan Whitney (born February 6, 1988) is an American former professional ice hockey forward. He most notably played with the New Jersey Devils of the National Hockey League (NHL).

== Playing career ==
As a youth, Whitney played in the 2002 Quebec International Pee-Wee Hockey Tournament with the Boston Junior Eagles minor ice hockey team.

After completing his collegiate career with the Boston College Eagles, Whitney signed a professional try-out contract with the Portland Pirates of the American Hockey League to end the 2010–11 season.

On August 22, 2011, the Albany Devils signed Whitney as a free agent to an AHL contract.

After two seasons with Albany, Whitney was rewarded with an NHL contract with Albany's parent affiliate, the New Jersey Devils. He signed a two-year entry-level deal on May 2, 2013.

During the 2013–14 season, on January 24, 2014 Whitney was called up to the New Jersey Devils to make his NHL debut against the Washington Capitals at the Prudential Center.

On July 1, 2015, Whitney signed as a free agent with the New York Islanders on a one-year two-way contract.

At the conclusion of the season, Whitney left the Islanders organization as a free agent. On July 1, 2016, he signed a one-year, two-way contract to join the Colorado Avalanche. After attending the Avalanche's 2016 training camp, Whitney was reassigned during the pre-season to AHL affiliate, the San Antonio Rampage. As a veteran of the American League, Whitney was selected as the Rampage captain to begin the 2016–17 campaign. After a slow transition adjusting offensively, Whitney resumed his scoring proficiency in collecting 11 goals and 28 points in 55 games before he was traded at the NHL deadline by the Avalanche to the Arizona Coyotes in exchange for Brendan Ranford on March 1, 2017.

As a free agent from the Coyotes in the off-season, Whitney agreed to sign a one-year AHL contract with the Hartford Wolf Pack on September 7, 2017. In the 2017-18 season, Whitney was selected as team captain for a second successive season in the AHL. In 40 games with the Wolf Pack, Whitney collected 19 points before on February 9, 2018, the Wolf Pack's parent club, the New York Rangers, traded Whitney to the Washington Capitals' AHL affiliate in the Hershey Bears.

After completing his eighth professional season in the AHL and North America, Whitney opted to embark on a European career, agreeing to a two-year contract with Swedish club, Linköping HC of the SHL, on July 10, 2018.

After two seasons with Linköping, Whitney opted to continue his career in the DEL, signing a contract with the Iserlohn Roosters on November 27, 2020. Whitney reached the playoffs in his first season in Iserlohn. With 21 goals and 24 assists, Withney became top scorer of the main round of the 2020–21 season.

In completing his second season with Iserlohn, his 11th professional season, Whitney ended his contract early in order to announce his retirement from professional hockey on July 15, 2022.

== Career statistics ==
			Regular season					Playoffs
Season	Team	League	GP	G	A	Pts	PIM	GP	G	A	Pts	PIM
2007–08	Boston College	HE	44	11	40	51	50	—	—	—	—	—
2008–09	Boston College	HE	36	7	8	15	36	—	—	—	—	—
2009–10	Boston College	HE	42	17	28	45	61	—	—	—	—	—
2010–11	Boston College	HE	39	5	26	31	60	—	—	—	—	—
2010–11	Portland Pirates	AHL	1	0	1	1	0	—	—	—	—	—
2011–12	Albany Devils	AHL	72	15	29	44	36	—	—	—	—	—
2012–13	Albany Devils	AHL	66	26	25	51	32	—	—	—	—	—
2013–14	Albany Devils	AHL	73	22	31	53	34	4	1	0	1	0
2013–14	New Jersey Devils	NHL	1	0	0	0	0	—	—	—	—	—
2014–15	Albany Devils	AHL	66	23	37	60	64	—	—	—	—	—
2014–15	New Jersey Devils	NHL	4	1	0	1	0	—	—	—	—	—
2015–16	Bridgeport Sound Tigers	AHL	36	14	19	33	29	—	—	—	—	—
2016–17	San Antonio Rampage	AHL	55	11	17	28	41	—	—	—	—	—
2016–17	Tucson Roadrunners	AHL	19	3	5	8	8	—	—	—	—	—
2017–18	Hartford Wolf Pack	AHL	40	9	10	19	16	—	—	—	—	—
2017–18	Hershey Bears	AHL	22	5	9	14	16	—	—	—	—	—
2018–19	Linköping HC	SHL	51	14	15	29	34	—	—	—	—	—
2019–20	Linköping HC	SHL	44	11	16	27	12	—	—	—	—	—
2020–21	Iserlohn Roosters	DEL	37	21	24	45	22	3	1	1	2	0
2021–22	Iserlohn Roosters	DEL	50	22	16	38	24	—	—	—	—	—
2022	Team Mullen	3ICE	23	21	18	39	—	—	—	—	—	—
2023	Team Mullen	3ICE	6	4	3	7	—	—	—	—	—	—
NHL totals			5	1	0	1	0	—	—	—	—	—
SHL totals			95	25	31	56	46	—	—	—	—	—

== Awards and honors ==
Award	Year
College
Hockey East All-Rookie Team	2007–08
NCAA All-Tournament Team	2010
3ICE
Joe Mullen Top Scorer Award	2022
John LeClair +/- Award	2022
