= 2013–14 NHL transactions =

The following is a list of all team-to-team transactions that have occurred in the National Hockey League during the 2013–14 NHL season. It lists what team each player has been traded to, signed by, or claimed by, and for which player(s) or draft pick(s), if applicable. Players who have retired are also listed. The 2013–14 trade deadline was on March 5, 2014. Any players traded or claimed off waivers after this date were eligible to play up until, but not in, the 2013–14 NHL playoffs.

== Retirement ==
Date	Last team	Name
July 11, 2013	New Jersey Devils	Ilya Kovalchuk
July 15, 2013	Montreal Canadiens	Blake Geoffrion
July 25, 2013	Minnesota Wild	Jarod Palmer
August 9, 2013	Philadelphia Flyers	Jody Shelley
August 29, 2013	Anaheim Ducks	Toni Lydman
September 9, 2013	Calgary Flames	Miikka Kiprusoff
September 25, 2013	Edmonton Oilers	Eric Belanger
October 15, 2013	Chicago Blackhawks	Steve Montador
October 20, 2013	New York Rangers	Martin Biron
October 20, 2013	New York Rangers	Roman Hamrlik
November 5, 2013	St. Louis Blues	Jason Arnott
November 13, 2013	Colorado Avalanche	Milan Hejduk
November 19, 2013	Columbus Blue Jackets	Adrian Aucoin
December 7, 2013	Boston Bruins	Jay Pandolfo
December 13, 2013	Chicago Blackhawks	Jamal Mayers
December 20, 2013	Philadelphia Flyers	Pavel Kubina
January 1, 2014	Phoenix Coyotes	Gilbert Brule
January 9, 2014	Boston Bruins	Wade Redden
January 15, 2014	St. Louis Blues	Jamie Langenbrunner
January 16, 2014	Calgary Flames	Steve Begin
January 24, 2014	Columbus Blue Jackets	Vaclav Prospal
February 25, 2014	Calgary Flames	Lane MacDermid
March 18, 2014	Edmonton Oilers	Darcy Hordichuk
March 8, 2014	Buffalo Sabres	Rostislav Klesla
April 11, 2014	Edmonton Oilers	Ryan Smyth
May 1, 2014	Washington Capitals	Tom Poti
May 2, 2014	Tampa Bay Lightning	Mathieu Garon
May 16, 2014	Anaheim Ducks	Teemu Selanne
May 30, 2014	Philadelphia Flyers	Eric Wellwood
June 20, 2014	Dallas Stars	Toby Petersen

== Contract terminations ==
At any time, a team and a player can mutually agree to terminate a player's contract.

For more details on contract terminations: Teams may buy out player contracts (after the conclusion of a season) for a portion of the remaining value of the contract, paid over a period of twice the remaining length of the contract. This reduced number and extended period is applied to the cap hit as well.

- If the player was under the age of 26 at the time of the buyout the player's pay and cap hit will reduced by a factor of 2/3 over the extended period.
- If the player was 26 or older at the time of the buyout the player's pay and cap hit will reduced by a factor of 1/3 over the extended period.
- If the player was 35 or older at the time of signing the contract the player's pay will be reduced by a factor of 1/3, but the cap hit will not be reduced over the extended period.

All players must clear waivers before having a contract terminated. Injured players cannot be bought out.

^{†} - Following the 2012–13 NHL lockout each team was granted two compliance buyouts (to be exercised after the 2012–13 season and/or after the 2013–14 season) that would not count against the salary cap in any further year, regardless of the player's age. After using a compliance buyout on a player, that player is prohibited from rejoining the team that bought him out for one year; the NHL deemed that the re-signing of a player following a trade and a subsequent compliance buyout would be ruled as cap circumvention.

Date	Name	Previous team	Notes
July 2, 2013	Mike Komisarek	Toronto Maple Leafs	Compliance buyout^{†}
July 2, 2013	Jeff Schultz	Washington Capitals	Compliance buyout^{†}
July 3, 2013	Rick DiPietro	New York Islanders	Compliance buyout^{†}
July 3, 2013	Filip Kuba	Florida Panthers	Buyout
July 4, 2013	Sergei Kostitsyn	Nashville Predators	Mutual termination
July 4, 2013	Keith Ballard	Vancouver Canucks	Compliance buyout^{†}
July 4, 2013	Tom Gilbert	Minnesota Wild	Compliance buyout^{†}
July 4, 2013	Carlo Colaiacovo	Detroit Red Wings	Compliance buyout^{†}
July 4, 2013	Greg Zanon	Colorado Avalanche	Buyout
July 4, 2013	Hal Gill	Nashville Predators	Compliance buyout^{†}
July 4, 2013	Nathan Gerbe	Buffalo Sabres	Buyout
July 5, 2013	Mikhail Grabovski	Toronto Maple Leafs	Compliance buyout^{†}
July 5, 2013	Johan Hedberg	New Jersey Devils	Compliance buyout^{†}
July 5, 2013	Eric Belanger	Edmonton Oilers	Compliance buyout^{†}
July 12, 2013	Reto Suri	Tampa Bay Lightning	Contract voided^{a}
August 23, 2013	Toni Rajala	Edmonton Oilers	Mutual termination
August 29, 2013	Bjorn Krupp	Minnesota Wild	Mutual termination
September 16, 2013	Ryan Howse	Calgary Flames	Mutual termination
September 23, 2013	Kyle Cumiskey	Anaheim Ducks	Mutual termination
November 21, 2013	Rostislav Olesz	New Jersey Devils	Mutual termination
December 19, 2013	Zach Hamill	Vancouver Canucks	Mutual termination
December 25, 2013	Adam Polasek	Vancouver Canucks	Mutual termination
January 5, 2014	Gilbert Brule	Phoenix Coyotes	Mutual termination
February 1, 2014	Stefan Warg	Anaheim Ducks	Mutual termination
February 18, 2014	Linus Omark	Buffalo Sabres	Mutual termination
February 23, 2014	Riku Helenius	Tampa Bay Lightning	Mutual termination
June 17, 2014	Aaron Rome	Dallas Stars	Compliance buyout^{†}
June 18, 2014	Ville Leino	Buffalo Sabres	Compliance buyout^{†}
June 18, 2014	David Booth	Vancouver Canucks	Compliance buyout^{†}
June 19, 2014	Jordin Tootoo	Detroit Red Wings	Compliance buyout^{†}
June 20, 2014	Brad Richards	New York Rangers	Compliance buyout^{†}
June 25, 2014	Ryan Malone	Tampa Bay Lightning	Compliance buyout^{†}
June 27, 2014	Mike Ribeiro	Phoenix Coyotes	Buyout
June 27, 2014	Martin Havlat	San Jose Sharks	Compliance buyout^{†}

a. Suri agreed to terms with the Lightning on June 13, 2013. Suri, however, had an existing contract with EV Zug of the Swiss National League A at the time which did not have a transfer agreement with the NHL or International Ice Hockey Federation, so the contract was voided.

== Free agency ==
Note: This does not include players who have re-signed with their previous team as an unrestricted free agent or as a restricted free agent.

Date	Player	New team	Previous team
July 5, 2013	Vincent Lecavalier	Philadelphia Flyers	Tampa Bay Lightning
July 5, 2013	Daniel Briere	Montreal Canadiens	Philadelphia Flyers
July 5, 2013	Keith Ballard	Minnesota Wild	Vancouver Canucks
July 5, 2013	Andrew Ference	Edmonton Oilers	Boston Bruins
July 5, 2013	Peter Regin	New York Islanders	Ottawa Senators
July 5, 2013	Joey Crabb	Florida Panthers	Washington Capitals
July 5, 2013	Daniel Alfredsson	Detroit Red Wings	Ottawa Senators
July 5, 2013	Ray Emery	Philadelphia Flyers	Chicago Blackhawks
July 5, 2013	Thomas Greiss	Phoenix Coyotes	San Jose Sharks
July 5, 2013	Mike Komisarek	Carolina Hurricanes	Toronto Maple Leafs
July 5, 2013	Boyd Gordon	Edmonton Oilers	Phoenix Coyotes
July 5, 2013	Jason LaBarbera	Edmonton Oilers	Phoenix Coyotes
July 5, 2013	Nathan Horton	Columbus Blue Jackets	Boston Bruins
July 5, 2013	Rob Scuderi	Pittsburgh Penguins	Los Angeles Kings
July 5, 2013	Clarke MacArthur	Ottawa Senators	Toronto Maple Leafs
July 5, 2013	Andre Benoit	Colorado Avalanche	Ottawa Senators
July 5, 2013	Mike Ribeiro	Phoenix Coyotes	Washington Capitals
July 5, 2013	Pierre-Marc Bouchard	New York Islanders	Minnesota Wild
July 5, 2013	Ryane Clowe	New Jersey Devils	New York Rangers
July 5, 2013	Jesse Joensuu	Edmonton Oilers	New York Islanders
July 5, 2013	Yann Danis	Philadelphia Flyers	Edmonton Oilers
July 5, 2013	Mike Mottau	Florida Panthers	Toronto Maple Leafs
July 5, 2013	Keith Aucoin	St. Louis Blues	New York Islanders
July 5, 2013	David Clarkson	Toronto Maple Leafs	New Jersey Devils
July 5, 2013	Viktor Stalberg	Nashville Predators	Chicago Blackhawks
July 5, 2013	Matt Cullen	Nashville Predators	Minnesota Wild
July 5, 2013	Nate Guenin	Colorado Avalanche	Anaheim Ducks
July 5, 2013	Stephen Weiss	Detroit Red Wings	Florida Panthers
July 5, 2013	Matt Hendricks	Nashville Predators	Washington Capitals
July 5, 2013	Dan Ellis	Dallas Stars	Carolina Hurricanes
July 5, 2013	Valtteri Filppula	Tampa Bay Lightning	Detroit Red Wings
July 5, 2013	Anton Khudobin	Carolina Hurricanes	Boston Bruins
July 5, 2013	Eric Nystrom	Nashville Predators	Dallas Stars
July 5, 2013	Yannick Weber	Vancouver Canucks	Montreal Canadiens
July 5, 2013	Jeff Schultz	Los Angeles Kings	Washington Capitals
July 5, 2013	Brad Richardson	Vancouver Canucks	Los Angeles Kings
July 5, 2013	T.J. Brennan	Toronto Maple Leafs	Nashville Predators
July 5, 2013	Aaron Johnson	New York Rangers	Boston Bruins
July 5, 2013	Ryan Hamilton	Edmonton Oilers	Toronto Maple Leafs
July 5, 2013	Nick Holden	Colorado Avalanche	Columbus Blue Jackets
July 5, 2013	J.T. Wyman	Colorado Avalanche	Tampa Bay Lightning
July 5, 2013	Guillaume Desbiens	Colorado Avalanche	Vancouver Canucks
July 5, 2013	Rostislav Olesz	New Jersey Devils	Chicago Blackhawks
July 5, 2013	Maxim Lapierre	St. Louis Blues	Vancouver Canucks
July 5, 2013	Michael Ryder	New Jersey Devils	Montreal Canadiens
July 5, 2013	Mike McKenna	Columbus Blue Jackets	St. Louis Blues
July 5, 2013	Mark Mancari	St. Louis Blues	Buffalo Sabres
July 5, 2013	Alex Biega	Vancouver Canucks	Buffalo Sabres
July 5, 2013	Carter Hutton	Nashville Predators	Chicago Blackhawks
July 5, 2013	Geoff Walker	Tampa Bay Lightning	Colorado Avalanche
July 5, 2013	Jeremy Smith	Columbus Blue Jackets	Nashville Predators
July 5, 2013	Alexandre Bolduc	St. Louis Blues	Phoenix Coyotes
July 5, 2013	Chris Conner	Pittsburgh Penguins	Phoenix Coyotes
July 5, 2013	Andrew Ebbett	Pittsburgh Penguins	Vancouver Canucks
July 5, 2013	Nick Drazenovic	Pittsburgh Penguins	Columbus Blue Jackets
July 5, 2013	Benoit Pouliot	New York Rangers	Tampa Bay Lightning
July 5, 2013	Jarome Iginla	Boston Bruins	Pittsburgh Penguins
July 5, 2013	Matt Cooke	Minnesota Wild	Pittsburgh Penguins
July 5, 2013	Trevor Smith	Toronto Maple Leafs	Pittsburgh Penguins
July 5, 2013	Chad Johnson	Boston Bruins	Phoenix Coyotes
July 5, 2013	Nick Johnson	Boston Bruins	Phoenix Coyotes
July 5, 2013	Mike Moore	Boston Bruins	Nashville Predators
July 5, 2013	Nikolai Khabibulin	Chicago Blackhawks	Edmonton Oilers
July 5, 2013	Drew Bagnall	Buffalo Sabres	Minnesota Wild
July 6, 2013	David Kolomatis	Washington Capitals	Los Angeles Kings
July 6, 2013	Jerome Samson	Winnipeg Jets	Carolina Hurricanes
July 6, 2013	Andrew Gordon	Winnipeg Jets	Vancouver Canucks
July 6, 2013	Richard Bachman	Edmonton Oilers	Dallas Stars
July 6, 2013	Mike Santorelli	Vancouver Canucks	Winnipeg Jets
July 6, 2013	Nick Tarnasky	Montreal Canadiens	Buffalo Sabres
July 6, 2013	Adam Pardy	Winnipeg Jets	Buffalo Sabres
July 6, 2013	Derek Roy	St. Louis Blues	Vancouver Canucks
July 6, 2013	Patrick McNeill	Columbus Blue Jackets	Washington Capitals
July 6, 2013	Jack Skille	Columbus Blue Jackets	Florida Panthers
July 7, 2013	Nolan Yonkman	Anaheim Ducks	Florida Panthers
July 7, 2013	Frederic St-Denis	Columbus Blue Jackets	Montreal Canadiens
July 8, 2013	Tyson Strachan	Washington Capitals	Florida Panthers
July 8, 2013	Joe Corvo	Ottawa Senators	Carolina Hurricanes
July 8, 2013	David Leggio	Washington Capitals	Buffalo Sabres
July 8, 2013	Matt Watkins	Washington Capitals	New York Islanders
July 8, 2013	Chris Mueller	Dallas Stars	Nashville Predators
July 8, 2013	Matt Gilroy	Florida Panthers	New York Rangers
July 8, 2013	Jon Matsumoto	Florida Panthers	San Jose Sharks
July 9, 2013	Jon Landry	Minnesota Wild	New York Islanders
July 10, 2013	Matt D'Agostini	Pittsburgh Penguins	New Jersey Devils
July 10, 2013	Matt Corrente	Carolina Hurricanes	New Jersey Devils
July 10, 2013	Troy Bodie	Toronto Maple Leafs	Anaheim Ducks
July 11, 2013	Aaron Palushaj	Carolina Hurricanes	Colorado Avalanche
July 11, 2013	Matt Halischuk	Winnipeg Jets	Nashville Predators
July 11, 2013	Tim Kennedy	Phoenix Coyotes	San Jose Sharks
July 11, 2013	Benn Ferriero	Vancouver Canucks	Minnesota Wild
July 11, 2013	Brandon DeFazio	Vancouver Canucks	New York Islanders
July 12, 2013	Jonathan Blum	Minnesota Wild	Nashville Predators
July 16, 2013	Dustin Penner	Anaheim Ducks	Los Angeles Kings
July 19, 2013	Brendan Mikkelson	Pittsburgh Penguins	Tampa Bay Lightning
July 19, 2013	Brandon Yip	Phoenix Coyotes	Nashville Predators
July 19, 2013	Michael Hutchinson	Winnipeg Jets	Boston Bruins
July 19, 2013	Theo Peckham	Chicago Blackhawks	Edmonton Oilers
July 19, 2013	Michael Kostka	Chicago Blackhawks	Toronto Maple Leafs
July 19, 2013	Christopher Gibson	Toronto Maple Leafs	Los Angeles Kings
July 22, 2013	Jaromir Jagr	New Jersey Devils	Boston Bruins
July 25, 2013	Zach Hamill	Vancouver Canucks	Florida Panthers
July 26, 2013	Nathan Gerbe	Carolina Hurricanes	Buffalo Sabres
July 31, 2013	Scott Gomez	Florida Panthers	San Jose Sharks
August 5, 2013	Jamie Tardif	Buffalo Sabres	Boston Bruins
August 5, 2013	Steve Pinizzotto	Florida Panthers	Vancouver Canucks
August 20, 2013	Brandon Segal	Washington Capitals	New York Rangers
August 20, 2013	Christian Hanson	St. Louis Blues	Boston Bruins
August 20, 2013	Mark Fistric	Anaheim Ducks	Edmonton Oilers
August 22, 2013	Douglas Murray	Montreal Canadiens	Pittsburgh Penguins
August 22, 2013	Mikhail Grabovski	Washington Capitals	Toronto Maple Leafs
September 12, 2013	Ron Hainsey	Carolina Hurricanes	Winnipeg Jets
September 23, 2013	Brenden Morrow	St. Louis Blues	Pittsburgh Penguins
September 23, 2013	Mason Raymond	Toronto Maple Leafs	Vancouver Canucks
September 24, 2013	Damien Brunner	New Jersey Devils	Detroit Red Wings
September 26, 2013	Tim Thomas	Florida Panthers	New York Islanders
September 28, 2013	Brad Boyes	Florida Panthers	New York Islanders
September 28, 2013	Tom Gilbert	Florida Panthers	Minnesota Wild
September 29, 2013	Ryan Whitney	Florida Panthers	Edmonton Oilers
October 1, 2013	Hal Gill	Philadelphia Flyers	Nashville Predators
October 2, 2013	Chuck Kobasew	Pittsburgh Penguins	Colorado Avalanche
October 2, 2013	Radek Dvorak	Carolina Hurricanes	Anaheim Ducks
October 12, 2013	Jeff Halpern	Phoenix Coyotes	Montreal Canadiens
October 31, 2013	Manny Malhotra	Carolina Hurricanes	Vancouver Canucks
November 6, 2013	Jerred Smithson	Toronto Maple Leafs	Edmonton Oilers
November 7, 2013	Pierre-Luc Letourneau-Leblond	Pittsburgh Penguins	Anaheim Ducks
November 8, 2013	Ilya Bryzgalov	Edmonton Oilers	Philadelphia Flyers
November 12, 2013	Carlo Colaiacovo	St. Louis Blues	Detroit Red Wings
December 12, 2013	Chris VandeVelde	Philadelphia Flyers	Edmonton Oilers

=== Imports ===
Date	Player	New team	Previous team	League
July 5, 2013	Bobby Robins	Boston Bruins	Providence Bruins	AHL
July 5, 2013	Chad Billins	Calgary Flames	Grand Rapids Griffins	AHL
July 5, 2013	Ryan Craig	Columbus Blue Jackets	Springfield Falcons	AHL
July 5, 2013	Luke Glendening	Detroit Red Wings	Grand Rapids Griffins	AHL
July 5, 2013	Will Acton	Edmonton Oilers	Toronto Marlies	AHL
July 5, 2013	Jesse Winchester	Florida Panthers	Jokerit	Liiga
July 5, 2013	Dominic Moore	New York Rangers	No Team	
July 5, 2013	Bobby Farnham	Pittsburgh Penguins	Wilkes-Barre/Scranton Penguins	AHL
July 5, 2013	Jeremie Blain	Vancouver Canucks	Chicago Wolves	AHL
July 6, 2013	Brad Hunt	Edmonton Oilers	Chicago Wolves	AHL
July 6, 2013	Stefan Fournier	Montreal Canadiens	Halifax Mooseheads	QMJHL
July 6, 2013	Martin St-Pierre	Montreal Canadiens	Rockford IceHogs	AHL
July 6, 2013	Darcy Zajac	New Jersey Devils	Albany Devils	AHL
July 6, 2013	John Albert	Winnipeg Jets	St. John's IceCaps	AHL
July 7, 2013	Pascal Pelletier	Vancouver Canucks	SCL Tigers	NLA
July 8, 2013	Zack Stortini	Anaheim Ducks	Hamilton Bulldogs	AHL
July 8, 2013	Rod Pelley	New Jersey Devils	Norfolk Admirals	AHL
July 10, 2013	Mark Flood	Carolina Hurricanes	Lokomotiv Yaroslavl	KHL
July 10, 2013	Rob Davison	San Jose Sharks	EC Red Bull Salzburg	EBEL
July 10, 2013	Adam Comrie	San Jose Sharks	Reading Royals	ECHL
July 11, 2013	Mike Murphy	Carolina Hurricanes	HC Spartak Moscow	KHL
July 12, 2013	Raman Hrabarenka	New Jersey Devils	Albany Devils	AHL
July 18, 2013	Denis Grebeshkov	Edmonton Oilers	Yugra Khanty-Mansiysk	KHL
July 24, 2013	Brad Winchester	Chicago Blackhawks	Milwaukee Admirals	AHL
July 24, 2013	Paul Ranger	Toronto Maple Leafs	Toronto Marlies	AHL
July 25, 2013	Ludwig Karlsson	Ottawa Senators	Northeastern Huskies	NCAA
July 25, 2013	Colin Stuart	Vancouver Canucks	Iserlohn Roosters	DEL
July 29, 2013	Bryan Rodney	Nashville Predators	Manchester Monarchs	AHL
July 30, 2013	Josh Jooris	Calgary Flames	Union Dutchmen	NCAA
July 30, 2013	Ronalds Kenins	Vancouver Canucks	ZSC Lions	NLA
August 1, 2013	Troy Donnay	New York Rangers	Erie Otters	OHL
August 22, 2013	Sergey Tolchinsky	Carolina Hurricanes	Sault Ste. Marie Greyhounds	OHL
September 17, 2013	Jean-Sebastien Dea	Pittsburgh Penguins	Rouyn-Noranda Huskies	QMJHL
September 26, 2013	Jacob Doty	St. Louis Blues	Medicine Hat Tigers	WHL
September 30, 2013	Simon Moser	Nashville Predators	SCL Tigers	NLA
October 1, 2013	Axel Blomqvist	Winnipeg Jets	Lethbridge Hurricanes	WHL
October 7, 2013	Scott Sabourin	Los Angeles Kings	Manchester Monarchs	AHL
October 12, 2013	Jeff Halpern	Phoenix Coyotes	HC TPS	Liiga
October 19, 2013	Brad Mills	Chicago Blackhawks	Rockford IceHogs	AHL
October 25, 2013	Viktor Svedberg	Chicago Blackhawks	Rockford IceHogs	AHL
November 4, 2013	Tyler Gaudet	Phoenix Coyotes	Sault Ste. Marie Greyhounds	OHL
November 7, 2013	Pierre-Luc Letourneau-Leblond	Pittsburgh Penguins	Wilkes-Barre/Scranton Penguins	AHL
November 11, 2013	Dave Steckel	Anaheim Ducks	Norfolk Admirals	AHL
November 30, 2013	Gilbert Brule	Phoenix Coyotes	ZSC Lions	NLA
December 3, 2013	Jack Nevins	Montreal Canadiens	Charlottetown Islanders	QMJHL
December 6, 2013	Carter Sandlak	Carolina Hurricanes	Plymouth Whalers	OHL
December 12, 2013	Chris VandeVelde	Philadelphia Flyers	Adirondack Phantoms	AHL
December 18, 2013	Maxime Fortunus	Dallas Stars	Texas Stars	AHL
December 18, 2013	Jean-Philippe Cote	Tampa Bay Lightning	Syracuse Crunch	AHL
December 28, 2013	Dane Fox	Vancouver Canucks	Erie Otters	OHL
January 10, 2014	Kenny Reiter	New York Islanders	Bridgeport Sound Tigers	AHL
January 21, 2014	David LeNeveu	New York Rangers	Hartford Wolf Pack	AHL
February 17, 2014	John Curry	Minnesota Wild	Iowa Wild	AHL
March 1, 2014	Brady Brassart	Minnesota Wild	Calgary Hitmen	WHL
March 3, 2014	Justin Johnson	New York Islanders	Bridgeport Sound Tigers	AHL
March 4, 2014	Zack Mitchell	Minnesota Wild	Guelph Storm	OHL
March 5, 2014	Cody Corbett	Colorado Avalanche	Edmonton Oil Kings	WHL
March 6, 2014	Barclay Goodrow	San Jose Sharks	North Bay Battalion	OHL
March 10, 2014	Yanni Gourde	Tampa Bay Lightning	Kalamazoo Wings	ECHL
March 11, 2014	Kevin Czuczman	New York Islanders	Lake Superior State Lakers	NCAA
March 12, 2014	Ryan Haggerty	New York Rangers	RPI Engineers	NCAA
March 14, 2014	Vincent LoVerde	Los Angeles Kings	Manchester Monarchs	AHL
March 14, 2014	Mike Zalewski	Vancouver Canucks	RPI Engineers	NCAA
March 17, 2014	Colin Campbell	Detroit Red Wings	Lake Superior State Lakers	NCAA
March 19, 2014	Greg Carey	Phoenix Coyotes	St. Lawrence Saints	NCAA
March 19, 2014	Pheonix Copley	Washington Capitals	Michigan Tech Huskies	NCAA
March 20, 2014	Matt Carey	Chicago Blackhawks	St. Lawrence Saints	NCAA
March 20, 2014	Cody Kunyk	Tampa Bay Lightning	Alaska Nanooks	NCAA
March 24, 2014	Trevor van Riemsdyk	Chicago Blackhawks	New Hampshire Wildcats	NCAA
March 26, 2014	Matt Bailey	Anaheim Ducks	Alaska Anchorage Seawolves	NCAA
March 26, 2014	Justin Dowling	Dallas Stars	Texas Stars	AHL
March 26, 2014	Ryan Carpenter	San Jose Sharks	Bowling Green Falcons	NCAA
March 29, 2014	Bryce Van Brabant	Calgary Flames	Quinnipiac Bobcats	NCAA
March 31, 2014	Jordan Oesterle	Edmonton Oilers	Western Michigan Broncos	NCAA
March 31, 2014	Christian Folin	Minnesota Wild	UMass Lowell River Hawks	NCAA
March 31, 2014	Chris McCarthy	New York Rangers	Vermont Catamounts	NCAA
April 1, 2014	Garrett Thompson	Ottawa Senators	Ferris State Bulldogs	NCAA
April 7, 2014	Ryan Faragher	Anaheim Ducks	St. Cloud State Huskies	NCAA
April 12, 2014	Patrick Brown	Carolina Hurricanes	Boston College Eagles	NCAA
April 12, 2014	Dan O'Donoghue	Phoenix Coyotes	Mercyhurst Lakers	NCAA
April 15, 2014	Mat Bodie	New York Rangers	Union Dutchmen	NCAA
April 24, 2014	Daniel Carr	Montreal Canadiens	Union Dutchmen	NCAA
May 7, 2014	Shayne Taker	Florida Panthers	Notre Dame Fighting Irish	NCAA
May 12, 2014	David Wolf	Calgary Flames	Hamburg Freezers	DEL
May 28, 2014	Johan Alm	Nashville Predators	Skelleftea AIK	SHL
May 28, 2014	Joakim Lindstrom	St. Louis Blues	Skelleftea AIK	SHL
May 29, 2014	Dennis Everberg	Colorado Avalanche	Rogle BK	SHL
May 29, 2014	Samuel Henley	Colorado Avalanche	Val-d'Or Foreurs	QMJHL
May 29, 2014	Borna Rendulic	Colorado Avalanche	HPK	Liiga
May 29, 2014	Roman Will	Colorado Avalanche	BK Mlada Boleslav	Cze.1
May 30, 2014	Melker Karlsson	San Jose Sharks	Skelleftea AIK	SHL
June 4, 2014	Simon Hjalmarsson	Columbus Blue Jackets	Linkoping HC	SHL
June 5, 2014	Michael Keranen	Minnesota Wild	HIFK	Liiga
June 10, 2014	Dennis Rasmussen	Chicago Blackhawks	Vaxjo Lakers	SHL
June 11, 2014	Petr Zamorsky	New York Rangers	Espoo Blues	Liiga
June 11, 2014	Pierre-Edouard Bellemare	Philadelphia Flyers	Skelleftea AIK	SHL
June 14, 2014	Tomas Nosek	Detroit Red Wings	HC Dynamo Pardubice	ELH
June 16, 2014	Iiro Pakarinen	Edmonton Oilers	HIFK	Liiga

== Trades ==
* - Retained Salary Transaction: Each team is allowed up to three contracts on their payroll where they have retained salary in a trade (i.e. the player no longer plays with Team A due to a trade to Team B, but Team A still retains some salary). Only up to 50% of a player's contract can be kept, and only up to 15% of a team's salary cap can be taken up by retained salary. A contract can only be involved in one of these trades twice.

=== June ===
June 30, 2013	To New York Rangers Justin Falk	To Minnesota Wild Benn Ferriero; CBJ's 6th-round pick in 2014
June 30, 2013	To San Jose Sharks Tyler Kennedy	To Pittsburgh Penguins 2nd-round pick in 2013
June 30, 2013	To Minnesota Wild Nino Niederreiter	To New York Islanders Cal Clutterbuck; NJD's 3rd-round pick in 2013
June 30, 2013	To New Jersey Devils Cory Schneider	To Vancouver Canucks 1st-round pick in 2013
June 30, 2013	To Carolina Hurricanes Andrej Sekera	To Buffalo Sabres Jamie McBain; 2nd-round pick in 2013
June 30, 2013	To Toronto Maple Leafs Dave Bolland	To Chicago Blackhawks 2nd-round pick in 2013; ANA's 4th-round pick in 2013; 4th-round pick in 2014
June 30, 2013	To Winnipeg Jets Michael Frolik	To Chicago Blackhawks 3rd-round pick in 2013; 5th-round pick in 2013

Pick-only 2013 NHL entry draft trades
June 30, 2013	To San Jose Sharks 1st-round pick in 2013 (#18 overall)	To Detroit Red Wings 1st-round pick in 2013 (#20 overall); PIT's 2nd-round pick in 2013 (#58 overall)
June 30, 2013	To Los Angeles Kings 2nd-round pick in 2013 (#37 overall)	To Edmonton Oilers 2nd-round pick in 2013 (#57 overall); 3rd-round pick in 2013 (#88 overall); CAR's 4th-round pick in 2013 (#96 overall)
June 30, 2013	To Phoenix Coyotes 2nd-round pick in 2013 (#39 overall)	To New Jersey Devils 2nd-round pick in 2013 (#42 overall); 3rd-round pick in 2013 (#73 overall)
June 30, 2013	To Pittsburgh Penguins 2nd-round pick in 2013 (#44 overall)	To Columbus Blue Jackets SJS's 2nd-round pick in 2013 (#50 overall); 3rd-round pick in 2013 (#89 overall)
June 30, 2013	To St. Louis Blues LAK's 2nd-round pick in 2013 (#57 overall)	To Edmonton Oilers 3rd-round pick in 2013 (#83 overall); TBL's 4th-round pick in 2013 (#94 overall); 4th-round pick in 2013 (#113 overall)
June 30, 2013	To Washington Capitals CHI's 2nd-round pick in 2013 (#61 overall)	To Winnipeg Jets 3rd-round pick in 2013 (#84 overall); 4th-round pick in 2013 (#114 overall); CGY's 5th-round pick in 2013 (#127 overall)
June 30, 2013	To Chicago Blackhawks 4th-round pick in 2013 (#111 overall); 5th-round pick in 2014	To San Jose Sharks ANA's 4th-round pick in 2013 (#117 overall); 5th-round pick in 2013 (#151 overall)
June 30, 2013	To St. Louis Blues TOR's 4th-round pick in 2013 (#112 overall)	To Nashville Predators 7th-round pick in 2013 (#203 overall); 4th-round pick in 2014
June 30, 2013	To Florida Panthers 7th-round pick in 2013 (#206 overall)	To Montreal Canadiens 7th-round pick in 2014
June 30, 2013	To New Jersey Devils 7th-round pick in 2013 (#208 overall)	To Los Angeles Kings 7th-round pick in 2015

=== July ===
July 1, 2013	To Philadelphia Flyers Kris Newbury	To New York Rangers Danny Syvret
July 2, 2013	To Calgary Flames TJ Galiardi	To San Jose Sharks 4th-round pick in 2015
July 2, 2013	To Tampa Bay Lightning Drew Olson	To Columbus Blue Jackets future considerations
July 2, 2013	To Montreal Canadiens Christian Thomas	To New York Rangers Danny Kristo
July 4, 2013	To Boston Bruins Loui Eriksson; Joe Morrow; Reilly Smith; Matt Fraser	To Dallas Stars Tyler Seguin; Rich Peverley; Ryan Button
July 4, 2013	To Dallas Stars Shawn Horcoff	To Edmonton Oilers Philip Larsen; 7th-round pick in 2016
July 5, 2013	To Calgary Flames Kris Russell	To St. Louis Blues 5th-round pick in 2014
July 5, 2013	To Ottawa Senators Bobby Ryan	To Anaheim Ducks Jakob Silfverberg; Stefan Noesen; 1st-round pick in 2014
July 5, 2013	To Montreal Canadiens George Parros	To Florida Panthers Philippe Lefebvre; FLA's 7th-round pick in 2014
July 5, 2013	To Winnipeg Jets Devin Setoguchi	To Minnesota Wild 2nd-round pick in 2014
July 6, 2013	To San Jose Sharks Kyle Bigos	To Edmonton Oilers Lee Moffie
July 7, 2013	To Buffalo Sabres Henrik Tallinder	To New Jersey Devils Riley Boychuk
July 8, 2013	To St. Louis Blues Patrick Cannone	To Ottawa Senators future considerations
July 10, 2013	To Edmonton Oilers David Perron	To St. Louis Blues Magnus Paajarvi; 2nd-round pick in 2014
July 16, 2013	To Los Angeles Kings Daniel Carcillo	To Chicago Blackhawks conditional 6th-round pick in 2015

=== September ===
September 28, 2013	To Florida Panthers Krys Barch; STL's 7th-round pick in 2015	To New Jersey Devils Scott Timmins; 6th-round pick in 2014
September 29, 2013	To Calgary Flames Joe Colborne	To Toronto Maple Leafs conditional 4th-round pick in 2014
September 29, 2013	To Vancouver Canucks Zac Dalpe; Jeremy Welsh*	To Carolina Hurricanes Kellan Tochkin; 4th-round pick in 2014
September 29, 2013	To Anaheim Ducks Mathieu Perreault	To Washington Capitals John Mitchell; 4th-round pick in 2014

=== October ===
October 21, 2013	To San Jose Sharks Mike Brown	To Edmonton Oilers 4th-round pick in 2014
October 27, 2013	To New York Islanders Thomas Vanek*	To Buffalo Sabres Matt Moulson conditional 1st-round pick in 2014; 2nd-round pick in 2015
October 31, 2013	To Philadelphia Flyers Steve Downie	To Colorado Avalanche Maxime Talbot

=== November ===
November 8, 2013	To Calgary Flames Ladislav Smid; Olivier Roy	To Edmonton Oilers Roman Horak; Laurent Brossoit
November 14, 2013	To Chicago Blackhawks Kris Versteeg*; Phillipe Lefebvre	To Florida Panthers Jimmy Hayes; Dylan Olsen
November 16, 2013	To Toronto Maple Leafs Peter Holland; Brad Staubitz	To Anaheim Ducks Jesse Blacker conditional 3rd-round pick in 2014; ANA's 7th-round pick in 2014
November 21, 2013	To Anaheim Ducks Tim Jackman	To Calgary Flames 6th-round pick in 2014
November 22, 2013	To Calgary Flames Lane MacDermid	To Dallas Stars 6th-round pick in 2014

=== December ===
December 6, 2013	To New York Rangers Kyle Beach	To Chicago Blackhawks Brandon Mashinter
December 14, 2013	To Chicago Blackhawks Jason LaBarbera	To Edmonton Oilers future considerations
December 19, 2013	To Buffalo Sabres Linus Omark	To Edmonton Oilers conditional 6th-round pick in 2014
December 30, 2013	To Calgary Flames Kevin Westgarth	To Carolina Hurricanes Greg Nemisz

=== January ===
January 1, 2014	To Toronto Maple Leafs Tim Gleason	To Carolina Hurricanes John-Michael Liles; Dennis Robertson
January 4, 2014	To New York Rangers Daniel Carcillo	To Los Angeles Kings conditional 7th-round pick in 2014
January 15, 2014	To Nashville Predators Devan Dubnyk*	To Edmonton Oilers Matt Hendricks
January 15, 2014	To Edmonton Oilers Ben Scrivens	To Los Angeles Kings 3rd-round pick in 2014
January 17, 2014	To Edmonton Oilers Steve Pinizzotto	To Florida Panthers Ryan Martindale
January 22, 2014	To Nashville Predators Michael Del Zotto	To New York Rangers Kevin Klein
January 22, 2014	To Toronto Maple Leafs Brandon Kozun	To Los Angeles Kings Andrew Crescenzi
January 31, 2014	To Edmonton Oilers Mark Fraser	To Toronto Maple Leafs Teemu Hartikainen; Cameron Abney

=== February ===
February 3, 2014	To Vancouver Canucks Raphael Diaz	To Montreal Canadiens Dale Weise
February 5, 2014	To San Jose Sharks Chad Rau	To Minnesota Wild Curt Gogol
February 6, 2014	To Montreal Canadiens Robert Czarnik	To Los Angeles Kings Steve Quailer
February 6, 2014	To Pittsburgh Penguins Spencer Machacek	To Columbus Blue Jackets Paul Thompson
February 6, 2014	To Chicago Blackhawks Pierre-Marc Bouchard*; Peter Regin*	To New York Islanders 4th-round pick in 2014
February 6, 2014	To Boston Bruins Blake Parlett	To Columbus Blue Jackets Carter Camper
February 26, 2014	To Minnesota Wild Brad Winchester	To Chicago Blackhawks Brian Connelly
February 28, 2014	To St. Louis Blues Ryan Miller*; Steve Ott conditional MIN's 2nd-round pick in 2014 conditional 4th-round pick in 2014	To Buffalo Sabres Jaroslav Halak; Chris Stewart; William Carrier conditional 1st-round pick in 2014; 1st-round pick in 2015

=== March ===
March 2, 2014	To Florida Panthers Mark Mancari	To St. Louis Blues Eric Selleck
March 2, 2014	To Florida Panthers Brandon Pirri	To Chicago Blackhawks 3rd-round pick in 2014; 5th-round pick in 2016
March 4, 2014	To Montreal Canadiens Mike Weaver	To Florida Panthers 5th-round pick in 2015
March 4, 2014	To Washington Capitals Dustin Penner	To Anaheim Ducks ANA's 4th-round pick in 2014
March 4, 2014	To Edmonton Oilers Viktor Fasth	To Anaheim Ducks 5th-round pick in 2014; 3rd-round pick in 2015
March 4, 2014	To Minnesota Wild Ilya Bryzgalov	To Edmonton Oilers BUF's 4th-round pick in 2014
March 4, 2014	To Anaheim Ducks Stephane Robidas	To Dallas Stars conditional 4th-round pick in 2014
March 4, 2014	To Ottawa Senators Patrick Mullen	To Vancouver Canucks Jeff Costello
March 4, 2014	To Philadelphia Flyers Andrew MacDonald	To New York Islanders Matt Mangene; 3rd-round pick in 2014; 2nd-round pick in 2015
March 4, 2014	To Florida Panthers Roberto Luongo*; Steven Anthony	To Vancouver Canucks Jacob Markstrom; Shawn Matthias
March 4, 2014	To Chicago Blackhawks David Rundblad*; Mathieu Brisebois	To Phoenix Coyotes 2nd-round pick in 2014
March 4, 2014	To Phoenix Coyotes Martin Erat; John Mitchell	To Washington Capitals Rostislav Klesla; Chris Brown; 4th-round pick in 2015
March 5, 2014	To New York Rangers Martin St. Louis conditional 2nd-round pick in 2015	To Tampa Bay Lightning Ryan Callahan conditional 2nd-round pick in 2014; 1st-round pick in 2015 conditional 7th-round pick in 2015
March 5, 2014	To Ottawa Senators Ales Hemsky*	To Edmonton Oilers 5th-round pick in 2014; 3rd-round pick in 2015
March 5, 2014	To Los Angeles Kings Brayden McNabb; Jonathan Parker; LAK's 2nd-round pick in 2014; LAK's 2nd-round pick in 2015	To Buffalo Sabres Hudson Fasching; Nicolas Deslauriers
March 5, 2014	To Montreal Canadiens Devan Dubnyk	To Nashville Predators future considerations
March 5, 2014	To Los Angeles Kings Marian Gaborik*	To Columbus Blue Jackets Matt Frattin; 2nd-round pick in 2014 (LAK's ) or 2015 (TOR's) conditional 3rd-round pick in 2014 (EDM's) or 2015 (LAK's)
March 5, 2014	To Pittsburgh Penguins Marcel Goc	To Florida Panthers 5th-round pick in 2014; 3rd-round pick in 2015
March 5, 2014	To New Jersey Devils Tuomo Ruutu*	To Carolina Hurricanes Andrei Loktionov conditional 3rd-round pick in 2017
March 5, 2014	To Dallas Stars Tim Thomas	To Florida Panthers Dan Ellis
March 5, 2014	To Columbus Blue Jackets Nick Schultz*	To Edmonton Oilers 5th-round pick in 2014
March 5, 2014	To Boston Bruins Andrej Meszaros*	To Philadelphia Flyers conditional 3rd-round pick in 2014 conditional 4th-round pick in 2015
March 5, 2014	To Minnesota Wild Matt Moulson; Cody McCormick	To Buffalo Sabres Torrey Mitchell; WPG's 2nd-round pick in 2014; 2nd-round pick in 2016
March 5, 2014	To New York Rangers Raphael Diaz	To Vancouver Canucks 5th-round pick in 2015
March 5, 2014	To Montreal Canadiens Thomas Vanek conditional 5th-round pick in 2014	To New York Islanders Sebastian Collberg conditional 2nd-round pick in 2014
March 5, 2014	To Colorado Avalanche Reto Berra	To Calgary Flames 2nd-round pick in 2014
March 5, 2014	To Detroit Red Wings David Legwand	To Nashville Predators Patrick Eaves; Calle Jarnkrok conditional 3rd-round pick in 2014
March 5, 2014	To Washington Capitals Jaroslav Halak; 3rd-round pick in 2015	To Buffalo Sabres Michal Neuvirth; Rostislav Klesla
March 5, 2014	To Ottawa Senators Alex Grant	To Anaheim Ducks Andre Petersson
March 5, 2014	To Columbus Blue Jackets Dana Tyrell; Matt Taormina	To Tampa Bay Lightning Jonathan Marchessault; Dalton Smith
March 5, 2014	To Pittsburgh Penguins Lee Stempniak	To Calgary Flames 3rd-round pick in 2014
March 5, 2014	To Los Angeles Kings James Livingston	To San Jose Sharks conditional 7th-round pick in 2016
March 12, 2014	To Phoenix Coyotes Cade Fairchild	To St. Louis Blues future considerations

=== April ===
April 19, 2014	To Nashville Predators Jaynen Rissling	To Washington Capitals 7th-round pick in 2014

=== May ===
May 1, 2014	To New York Islanders Jaroslav Halak	To Washington Capitals CHI's 4th-round pick in 2014

=== June (2014) ===
June 5, 2014	To New York Islanders Dan Boyle	To San Jose Sharks conditional 5th-round pick in 2015
June 14, 2014	To Anaheim Ducks Louis Leblanc	To Montreal Canadiens conditional 5th-round pick in 2015
June 23, 2014	To Columbus Blue Jackets Scott Hartnell	To Philadelphia Flyers R.J. Umberger; 4th-round pick in 2015
June 25, 2014	To Edmonton Oilers Nikita Nikitin	To Columbus Blue Jackets 5th-round pick in 2014
June 27, 2014	To Anaheim Ducks Ryan Kesler; 3rd-round pick in 2015	To Vancouver Canucks Luca Sbisa; Nick Bonino; 1st-round pick in 2014; 3rd-round pick in 2014
June 27, 2014	To Tampa Bay Lightning Jason Garrison; Jeff Costello; 7th-round pick in 2015	To Vancouver Canucks 2nd-round pick in 2014
June 27, 2014	To Vancouver Canucks Derek Dorsett	To New York Rangers ANA's 3rd-round pick in 2014

== Waivers ==
Once an NHL player has played in a certain number of games or a set number of seasons has passed since the signing of his first NHL contract (see here), that player must be offered to all of the other NHL teams before he can be assigned to a minor league affiliate.

Date	Player	New team	Previous team
September 22, 2013	Marc-Andre Cliche	Colorado Avalanche	Los Angeles Kings
September 23, 2013	Steve MacIntyre	Edmonton Oilers	Pittsburgh Penguins
September 29, 2013	Luke Gazdic	Edmonton Oilers	Dallas Stars
September 30, 2013	Ryan Stanton	Vancouver Canucks	Chicago Blackhawks
October 3, 2013	Alexander Urbom	Washington Capitals	New Jersey Devils
November 2, 2013	Keaton Ellerby	Winnipeg Jets	Los Angeles Kings
November 17, 2013	Dustin Jeffrey	Dallas Stars	Pittsburgh Penguins
November 27, 2013	Matt D'Agostini	Buffalo Sabres	Pittsburgh Penguins
November 28, 2013	Corey Tropp	Columbus Blue Jackets	Buffalo Sabres
January 2, 2014	Taylor Pyatt	Pittsburgh Penguins	New York Rangers
January 3, 2014	Zenon Konopka	Buffalo Sabres	Minnesota Wild
January 8, 2014	Alexander Urbom	New Jersey Devils	Washington Capitals
February 23, 2014	Michael Kostka	Tampa Bay Lightning	Chicago Blackhawks
March 5, 2014	Cory Conacher	Buffalo Sabres	Ottawa Senators
March 5, 2014	Corey Potter	Boston Bruins	Edmonton Oilers

== See also ==
- 2013–14 NHL suspensions and fines
- 2013–14 NHL Three Star Awards
- 2013 NHL entry draft
- 2014 NHL entry draft
- 2015 NHL entry draft
- 2013 in sports
- 2014 in sports
- 2012–13 NHL transactions
- 2014–15 NHL transactions
