= 2012–13 NHL transactions =

The following is a list of all team-to-team transactions that have occurred in the National Hockey League during the lockout shortened 2012–13 NHL season. It lists what team each player has been officially released by, traded to, signed by, or claimed by, and for which player(s) or draft pick(s), if applicable. Players who have retired are also listed. The 2012–13 trade deadline was set for April 3, 2013, at 3 pm EST. Players involved in any trades after this deadline are ineligible to participate in the Stanley Cup playoffs.

== Retirement ==
Date	Name	Last team
July 4, 2012	Nolan Baumgartner	Vancouver Canucks
July 25, 2012	Steve Staios	New York Islanders
September 4, 2012	John Madden	Florida Panthers
October 9, 2012	Brett MacLean	Phoenix Coyotes
November 2, 2012	Eric Godard	Dallas Stars
November 19, 2012	Jaroslav Spacek	Carolina Hurricanes
November 25, 2012	Mark Parrish	Ottawa Senators
January 8, 2013	Kristian Huselius	Columbus Blue Jackets
January 16, 2013	Sean O'Donnell	Chicago Blackhawks
January 17, 2013	Marty Turco	Boston Bruins
January 22, 2013	Tomas Holmstrom	Detroit Red Wings
February 13, 2013	Andrew Brunette	Chicago Blackhawks
February 19, 2013	Mathieu Darche	Montreal Canadiens
March 4, 2013	Brian Rolston	Boston Bruins
March 21, 2013	Alexei Kovalev	Florida Panthers
April 12, 2013	Antero Niittymaki	San Jose Sharks
April 26, 2013	Jochen Hecht	Buffalo Sabres
May 22, 2013	Andy Sutton	Edmonton Oilers
June 5, 2013	Scott Nichol	St. Louis Blues
June 6, 2013	Andy McDonald	St. Louis Blues

== Contract terminations ==
At any time, a team and a player can mutually agree to terminate a player's contract.

For more details on contract terminations:

Teams may buy out player contracts (after the conclusion of a season) for a portion of the remaining value of the contract, paid over a period of twice the remaining length of the contract. This reduced number and extended period is applied to the cap hit as well.

- If the player was under the age of 26 at the time of the buyout the player's pay and cap hit will reduced by a factor of 2/3 over the extended period.
- If the player was 26 or older at the time of the buyout the player's pay and cap hit will reduced by a factor of 1/3 over the extended period.
- If the player was 35 or older at the time of signing the contract the player's pay will be reduced by a factor of 1/3, but the cap hit will not be reduced over the extended period.

All players must clear waivers before having a contract terminated. Injured players cannot be bought out.

^{†} - Following the 2012–13 NHL lockout each team was granted two compliance buyouts (to be exercised after the 2012–13 season and/or after the 2013–14 season that would not count against the salary cap in any further year, regardless of the player's age. After using a compliance buyout on a player, that player is prohibited from rejoining the team that bought him out for one year; the NHL deemed that the re-signing of a player following a trade and a subsequent compliance buyout would be ruled as cap circumvention.

^{‡} - Following the 2012–13 NHL lockout each team was granted one accelerated compliance buyout on a player with a salary cap hit of $3 million U.S. or more before the regular season began. If an accelerated compliance buyout is used, that team will only have one more compliance buyout left, and they must use it after the completion of the 2012–13 season (and before the start of 2013–14 season). The player's cap hit is applied in full to the team's salary cap for the 2012–13 season, but for no season after, regardless of contract length.

Date	Name	Last team	Notes
June 28, 2012	Eric Godard	Dallas Stars	Buyout
June 30, 2012	Eric Boulton	New Jersey Devils	Buyout
June 30, 2012	Matt Bradley	Florida Panthers	Buyout
June 30, 2012	Derek Joslin	Carolina Hurricanes	Buyout
June 30, 2012	Colby Armstrong	Toronto Maple Leafs	Buyout
June 30, 2012	Oskars Bartulis	Philadelphia Flyers	Buyout
July 27, 2012	Bobby Butler	Ottawa Senators	Buyout
September 11, 2012	Nick Petersen	Pittsburgh Penguins	Mutual termination
January 13, 2013	Alain Berger	Montreal Canadiens	Mutual termination
January 17, 2013	Scott Gomez	Montreal Canadiens	Accelerated compliance buyout^{‡}
January 17, 2013	Wade Redden	New York Rangers	Accelerated compliance buyout^{‡}
January 17, 2013	Corey Elkins	Anaheim Ducks	Mutual termination
May 2, 2013	Alexander Avtsin	Montreal Canadiens	Mutual termination
June 26, 2013	Danny Briere	Philadelphia Flyers	Compliance buyout^{†}
June 26, 2013	Ilya Bryzgalov	Philadelphia Flyers	Compliance buyout^{†}
June 28, 2013	Tomas Kaberle	Montreal Canadiens	Compliance buyout^{†}
June 28, 2013	Rostislav Olesz	Chicago Blackhawks	Compliance buyout^{†}
June 28, 2013	Steve Montador	Chicago Blackhawks	Compliance buyout^{†}
June 28, 2013	Vincent Lecavalier	Tampa Bay Lightning	Compliance buyout^{†}

== Free agency ==
Date	Player	New team	Previous team
July 1, 2012	Jonas Gustavsson	Detroit Red Wings	Winnipeg Jets
July 1, 2012	David Moss	Phoenix Coyotes	Calgary Flames
July 1, 2012	John Mitchell	Colorado Avalanche	New York Rangers
July 1, 2012	Mike Lundin	Ottawa Senators	Minnesota Wild
July 1, 2012	Joe Corvo	Carolina Hurricanes	Boston Bruins
July 1, 2012	Jeff Zatkoff	Pittsburgh Penguins	Los Angeles Kings
July 1, 2012	Zenon Konopka	Minnesota Wild	Ottawa Senators
July 1, 2012	Torrey Mitchell	Minnesota Wild	San Jose Sharks
July 1, 2012	Colby Armstrong	Montreal Canadiens	Toronto Maple Leafs
July 1, 2012	Guillaume Latendresse	Ottawa Senators	Minnesota Wild
July 1, 2012	Brad Staubitz	Anaheim Ducks	Montreal Canadiens
July 1, 2012	Ray Whitney	Dallas Stars	Phoenix Coyotes
July 1, 2012	Adam Burish	San Jose Sharks	Dallas Stars
July 1, 2012	Brad Boyes	New York Islanders	Buffalo Sabres
July 1, 2012	Matt Carkner	New York Islanders	Ottawa Senators
July 1, 2012	Tanner Glass	Pittsburgh Penguins	Winnipeg Jets
July 1, 2012	Arron Asham	New York Rangers	Pittsburgh Penguins
July 1, 2012	Filip Kuba	Florida Panthers	Ottawa Senators
July 1, 2012	Chad Johnson	Phoenix Coyotes	New York Rangers
July 1, 2012	Francis Bouillon	Montreal Canadiens	Nashville Predators
July 1, 2012	Brandon Prust	Montreal Canadiens	New York Rangers
July 1, 2012	Greg Zanon	Colorado Avalanche	Boston Bruins
July 1, 2012	Sheldon Brookbank	Chicago Blackhawks	Anaheim Ducks
July 1, 2012	Alexei Ponikarovsky	Winnipeg Jets	New Jersey Devils
July 1, 2012	George Parros	Florida Panthers	Anaheim Ducks
July 1, 2012	Eric Boulton	New York Islanders	New Jersey Devils
July 1, 2012	Sheldon Souray	Anaheim Ducks	Dallas Stars
July 1, 2012	Pierre-Alexandre Parenteau	Colorado Avalanche	New York Islanders
July 1, 2012	Chris Mason	Nashville Predators	Winnipeg Jets
July 1, 2012	Adrian Aucoin	Columbus Blue Jackets	Phoenix Coyotes
July 1, 2012	Micheal Haley	New York Rangers	New York Islanders
July 1, 2012	Jay McClement	Toronto Maple Leafs	Colorado Avalanche
July 1, 2012	Sami Salo	Tampa Bay Lightning	Vancouver Canucks
July 1, 2012	Bryan Allen	Anaheim Ducks	Carolina Hurricanes
July 1, 2012	Dylan Reese	Pittsburgh Penguins	New York Islanders
July 1, 2012	Cedrick Desjardins	Montreal Canadiens	Colorado Avalanche
July 1, 2012	Mikael Samuelsson	Detroit Red Wings	Florida Panthers
July 1, 2012	Jordin Tootoo	Detroit Red Wings	Nashville Predators
July 1, 2012	Aaron Rome	Dallas Stars	Vancouver Canucks
July 1, 2012	Warren Peters	Pittsburgh Penguins	Minnesota Wild
July 1, 2012	Jason Garrison	Vancouver Canucks	Florida Panthers
July 1, 2012	John Scott	Buffalo Sabres	New York Rangers
July 1, 2012	Trevor Smith	Pittsburgh Penguins	Tampa Bay Lightning
July 1, 2012	Joey Crabb	Washington Capitals	Toronto Maple Leafs
July 1, 2012	Matt Watkins	New York Islanders	Phoenix Coyotes
July 1, 2012	Riley Holzapfel	Pittsburgh Penguins	Anaheim Ducks
July 1, 2012	Bracken Kearns	San Jose Sharks	Florida Panthers
July 1, 2012	Taylor Chorney	St. Louis Blues	Edmonton Oilers
July 1, 2012	Mike McKenna	St. Louis Blues	Ottawa Senators
July 1, 2012	Mike Kostka	Toronto Maple Leafs	Tampa Bay Lightning
July 2, 2012	Colin McDonald	New York Islanders	Pittsburgh Penguins
July 2, 2012	Garrett Stafford	Washington Capitals	Montreal Canadiens
July 2, 2012	Jeff Woywitka	St. Louis Blues	New York Rangers
July 2, 2012	Jiri Hudler	Calgary Flames	Detroit Red Wings
July 2, 2012	Chris Conner	Phoenix Coyotes	Detroit Red Wings
July 2, 2012	Olli Jokinen	Winnipeg Jets	Calgary Flames
July 3, 2012	Danny Syvret	Philadelphia Flyers	St. Louis Blues
July 3, 2012	Jack Hillen	Washington Capitals	Nashville Predators
July 3, 2012	Bill Thomas	Colorado Avalanche	Florida Panthers
July 3, 2012	Mike Moore	Nashville Predators	San Jose Sharks
July 3, 2012	Rob Klinkhammer	Phoenix Coyotes	Ottawa Senators
July 3, 2012	Jaromir Jagr	Dallas Stars	Philadelphia Flyers
July 3, 2012	Taylor Pyatt	New York Rangers	Phoenix Coyotes
July 3, 2012	Jean-Francois Jacques	Florida Panthers	Anaheim Ducks
July 3, 2012	Jon Matsumoto	San Jose Sharks	Florida Panthers
July 3, 2012	Jake Dowell	Minnesota Wild	Dallas Stars
July 3, 2012	Tyler Sloan	Dallas Stars	Nashville Predators
July 4, 2012	Steve Sullivan	Phoenix Coyotes	Pittsburgh Penguins
July 4, 2012	Zach Parise	Minnesota Wild	New Jersey Devils
July 4, 2012	Ryan Suter	Minnesota Wild	Nashville Predators
July 4, 2012	Al Montoya	Winnipeg Jets	New York Islanders
July 4, 2012	Matt Carle	Tampa Bay Lightning	Philadelphia Flyers
July 5, 2012	Dane Byers	Edmonton Oilers	Columbus Blue Jackets
July 5, 2012	Derek Joslin	Vancouver Canucks	Carolina Hurricanes
July 5, 2012	Philippe Dupuis	Pittsburgh Penguins	Toronto Maple Leafs
July 5, 2012	Krys Barch	New Jersey Devils	Florida Panthers
July 5, 2012	Bruno Gervais	Philadelphia Flyers	Tampa Bay Lightning
July 5, 2012	Ruslan Fedotenko	Philadelphia Flyers	New York Rangers
July 5, 2012	Kevin Porter	Buffalo Sabres	Colorado Avalanche
July 5, 2012	Patrick Mullen	Vancouver Canucks	Los Angeles Kings
July 5, 2012	Andrew Murray	St. Louis Blues	Detroit Red Wings
July 6, 2012	Matt Taormina	Tampa Bay Lightning	New Jersey Devils
July 6, 2012	Mark Dekanich	Winnipeg Jets	Columbus Blue Jackets
July 6, 2012	Mark Mancari	Buffalo Sabres	Vancouver Canucks
July 6, 2012	Andrew Bodnarchuk	Los Angeles Kings	Boston Bruins
July 6, 2012	Brian Connelly	Minnesota Wild	Calgary Flames
July 7, 2012	Ryan Stoa	Washington Capitals	Colorado Avalanche
July 7, 2012	Andre Deveaux	Florida Panthers	New York Rangers
July 9, 2012	Christian Hanson	Boston Bruins	Washington Capitals
July 9, 2012	Jeff Halpern	New York Rangers	Washington Capitals
July 10, 2012	Logan Pyett	New York Rangers	Detroit Red Wings
July 10, 2012	Sean Sullivan	Colorado Avalanche	Florida Panthers
July 10, 2012	Tyler Eckford	Ottawa Senators	Phoenix Coyotes
July 11, 2012	Brandon Segal	New York Rangers	Tampa Bay Lightning
July 11, 2012	Marc-Andre Gragnani	Carolina Hurricanes	Vancouver Canucks
July 11, 2012	Joel Rechlicz	Phoenix Coyotes	Washington Capitals
July 11, 2012	Wojtek Wolski	Washington Capitals	Florida Panthers
July 11, 2012	Garnet Exelby	Boston Bruins	Detroit Red Wings
July 11, 2012	Peter Mueller	Florida Panthers	Colorado Avalanche
July 12, 2012	Sean Collins	New York Rangers	Washington Capitals
July 12, 2012	Nick Johnson	Phoenix Coyotes	Minnesota Wild
July 13, 2012	Benn Ferriero	Pittsburgh Penguins	San Jose Sharks
July 16, 2012	Nathan Lawson	Ottawa Senators	Montreal Canadiens
July 18, 2012	Aaron Johnson	Boston Bruins	Columbus Blue Jackets
July 19, 2012	Tim Wallace	Carolina Hurricanes	Tampa Bay Lightning
July 20, 2012	Daniel Winnik	Anaheim Ducks	San Jose Sharks
July 24, 2012	Keith Aucoin	Toronto Maple Leafs	Washington Capitals
July 25, 2012	Nathan McIver	New York Islanders	Boston Bruins
July 26, 2012	Alexander Semin	Carolina Hurricanes	Washington Capitals
July 30, 2012	Guillaume Desbiens	Vancouver Canucks	Calgary Flames
August 9, 2012	Bobby Butler	New Jersey Devils	Ottawa Senators
August 17, 2012	Scott Hannan	Nashville Predators	Calgary Flames
September 11, 2012	Michal Rozsival	Chicago Blackhawks	Phoenix Coyotes
September 13, 2012	Carlo Colaiacovo	Detroit Red Wings	St. Louis Blues
January 13, 2013	Radek Martinek	New York Islanders	Columbus Blue Jackets
January 13, 2013	Dan Ellis	Carolina Hurricanes	Anaheim Ducks
January 13, 2013	Mike Mottau	Toronto Maple Leafs	Boston Bruins
January 13, 2013	Kurtis Foster	Philadelphia Flyers	Minnesota Wild
January 13, 2013	Matt Gilroy	New York Rangers	Ottawa Senators
January 13, 2013	Eric Fehr	Washington Capitals	Winnipeg Jets
January 13, 2013	Cam Barker	Vancouver Canucks	Edmonton Oilers
January 14, 2013	Jim Vandermeer	Vancouver Canucks	San Jose Sharks
January 15, 2013	Pierre-Luc Letourneau-Leblond	Anaheim Ducks	Calgary Flames
January 16, 2013	Ryan Parent	Anaheim Ducks	Vancouver Canucks
January 16, 2013	Jay Rosehill	Anaheim Ducks	Toronto Maple Leafs
January 17, 2013	Steve Begin	Calgary Flames	Nashville Predators
January 19, 2013	Wade Redden	St. Louis Blues	New York Rangers
January 22, 2013	Kent Huskins	Detroit Red Wings	St. Louis Blues
January 23, 2013	Scott Gomez	San Jose Sharks	Montreal Canadiens
January 25, 2013	Mike Knuble	Philadelphia Flyers	Washington Capitals
February 12, 2013	Jay Pandolfo	Boston Bruins	New York Islanders
February 25, 2013	Mark Eaton	Pittsburgh Penguins	New York Islanders
March 4, 2013	Josh Nicholls	New York Rangers	Toronto Maple Leafs
March 5, 2013	Tom Kostopoulos	Pittsburgh Penguins	Calgary Flames
March 13, 2013	Brett Clark	Minnesota Wild	Tampa Bay Lightning
March 14, 2013	Troy Rutkowski	Ottawa Senators	Colorado Avalanche
March 23, 2013	Radek Dvorak	Anaheim Ducks	Dallas Stars
April 11, 2013	Petr Straka	Philadelphia Flyers	Columbus Blue Jackets
June 15, 2013	Joacim Eriksson	Vancouver Canucks	Philadelphia Flyers

=== Offer sheets ===
An offer sheet is a contract offered to a restricted free agent by a team other than the one for which he played during the prior season. If the player signs the offer sheet, his current team has seven days to match the contract offer and keep the player or else he goes to the team that gave the offer sheet, with compensation going to his first team.

Date Offered	Player	Original Team	Offer Team	Contract Offered	Date Resolved	Result	Compensation
July 19, 2012	Shea Weber	Nashville Predators	Philadelphia Flyers	14 years, $110 million	July 24, 2012	matched	none
February 28, 2013	Ryan O'Reilly	Colorado Avalanche	Calgary Flames	2 years, $10 million	February 28, 2013	matched	none

=== Imports ===
Date	Player	New team	Previous team	League
July 1, 2012	Jordan Hendry	Anaheim Ducks	HC Lugano	NLA
July 1, 2012	Ben Street	Calgary Flames	Wilkes-Barre/Scranton Penguins	AHL
July 1, 2012	Bryan Lerg	Colorado Avalanche	Wilkes-Barre/Scranton Penguins	AHL
July 1, 2012	Thomas Pock	Colorado Avalanche	MoDo Hockey	SEL
July 1, 2012	Geoff Walker	Colorado Avalanche	Wilkes-Barre/Scranton Penguins	AHL
July 1, 2012	Jonathan Audy-Marchessault	Columbus Blue Jackets	Connecticut Whale	AHL
July 1, 2012	Damien Brunner	Detroit Red Wings	EV Zug	NLA
July 1, 2012	Dov Grumet-Morris	Florida Panthers	San Antonio Rampage	AHL
July 1, 2012	Kevin Henderson	Nashville Predators	Milwaukee Admirals	AHL
July 1, 2012	Jon Landry	New York Islanders	Bridgeport Sound Tigers	AHL
July 1, 2012	Andre Benoit	Ottawa Senators	HC Spartak Moscow	KHL
July 1, 2012	Scott Ford	St. Louis Blues	Milwaukee Admirals	AHL
July 1, 2012	Artem Sergeev	Tampa Bay Lightning	Val-d'Or Foreurs	QMJHL
July 2, 2012	Antoine Roussel	Dallas Stars	Chicago Wolves	AHL
July 2, 2012	Jon Rheault	Florida Panthers	Abbotsford Heat	AHL
July 2, 2012	Brandon DeFazio	New York Islanders	Wilkes-Barre/Scranton Penguins	AHL
July 2, 2012	Danny Groulx	San Jose Sharks	Yugra Khanty-Mansiysk	KHL
July 3, 2012	Cullen Eddy	Philadelphia Flyers	Adirondack Phantoms	AHL
July 4, 2012	Kyle Jean	New York Rangers	Lake Superior State Lakers	NCAA
July 10, 2012	Corey Elkins	Anaheim Ducks	HC Dynamo Pardubice	ELH
July 11, 2012	Michael Houser	Florida Panthers	London Knights	OHL
July 11, 2012	Josh McFadden	Florida Panthers	Sudbury Wolves	OHL
July 14, 2012	Matt Clackson	Washington Capitals	Chicago Wolves	AHL
July 16, 2012	Nick Tarnasky	Buffalo Sabres	HC Vityaz	KHL
July 23, 2012	Maxime Lagace	Dallas Stars	Prince Edward Island Rocket	QMJHL
August 1, 2012	Jayson Megna	Pittsburgh Penguins	Nebraska-Omaha Mavericks	NCAA
August 2, 2012	Dmitry Korobov	Tampa Bay Lightning	HC Dinamo Minsk	KHL
September 13, 2012	Kurtis MacDermid	Los Angeles Kings	Owen Sound Attack	OHL
September 13, 2012	Evan McEneny	Vancouver Canucks	Kitchener Rangers	OHL
September 14, 2012	Andrei Makarov	Buffalo Sabres	Saskatoon Blades	WHL
January 12, 2013	Jochen Hecht	Buffalo Sabres	Adler Mannheim	DEL
January 12, 2013	Dan Ellis	Carolina Hurricanes	Charlotte Checkers	AHL
January 13, 2013	Eric Fehr	Washington Capitals	HPK	SM-liiga
January 16, 2013	Troy Bodie	Anaheim Ducks	Norfolk Admirals	AHL
January 16, 2013	Jason Jaffray	Winnipeg Jets	St. John's IceCaps	AHL
January 18, 2013	Alexei Kovalev	Florida Panthers	Atlant Moscow Oblast	KHL
February 5, 2013	Brett Gallant	New York Islanders	Bridgeport Sound Tigers	AHL
February 6, 2013	Danny Taylor	Calgary Flames	Abbotsford Heat	AHL
February 28, 2013	Brandon Alderson	Philadelphia Flyers	Sault Ste. Marie Greyhounds	OHL
March 3, 2013	Taylor Peters	Dallas Stars	Portland Winterhawks	WHL
March 4, 2013	Charlie Sarault	Anaheim Ducks	Sarnia Sting	OHL
March 4, 2013	Steve Oleksy	Washington Capitals	Hershey Bears	AHL
March 5, 2013	Kevin Gagne	Anaheim Ducks	Rimouski Océanic	QMJHL
March 5, 2013	Mathieu Brisebois	Phoenix Coyotes	Rouyn-Noranda Huskies	QMJHL
March 16, 2013	Kellan Lain	Vancouver Canucks	Lake Superior State Lakers	NCAA
March 20, 2013	Andrew Hammond	Ottawa Senators	Bowling Green Falcons	NCAA
March 21, 2013	Joey Diamond	New York Islanders	Maine Black Bears	NCAA
March 21, 2013	Kyle Flanagan	Philadelphia Flyers	St. Lawrence Saints	NCAA
March 21, 2013	Andrej Sustr	Tampa Bay Lightning	Nebraska-Omaha Mavericks	NCAA
March 22, 2013	Andrew Agozzino	Colorado Avalanche	Lake Erie Monsters	AHL
March 22, 2013	Markus Lauridsen	Colorado Avalanche	Lake Erie Monsters	AHL
March 25, 2013	Chris Casto	Boston Bruins	Minnesota Duluth Bulldogs	NCAA
March 25, 2013	Buddy Robinson	Ottawa Senators	Lake Superior State Lakers	NCAA
March 28, 2013	Conor Allen	New York Rangers	UMass Minutemen	NCAA
March 29, 2013	Danny DeKeyser	Detroit Red Wings	Western Michigan Broncos	NCAA
March 31, 2013	Tommy Hughes	New York Rangers	London Knights	OHL
April 1, 2013	Tim Schaller	Buffalo Sabres	Providence Friars	NCAA
April 2, 2013	Daniil Tarasov	San Jose Sharks	Worcester Sharks	AHL
April 2, 2013	Drew MacIntyre	Toronto Maple Leafs	Toronto Marlies	AHL
April 2, 2013	Nate Schmidt	Washington Capitals	Minnesota Golden Gophers	NCAA
April 3, 2013	Steve Whitney	Anaheim Ducks	Boston College Eagles	NCAA
April 3, 2013	Jared Coreau	Detroit Red Wings	Northern Michigan Wildcats	NCAA
April 4, 2013	Matt Lindblad	Boston Bruins	Dartmouth Big Green	NCAA
April 5, 2013	Eriah Hayes	San Jose Sharks	Minnesota State Mavericks	NCAA
April 5, 2013	Rylan Schwartz	San Jose Sharks	Colorado College Tigers	NCAA
April 5, 2013	Julien Brouillette	Washington Capitals	Hershey Bears	AHL
April 8, 2013	Troy Grosenick	San Jose Sharks	Union Dutchmen	NCAA
April 8, 2013	Jussi Olkinuora	Winnipeg Jets	Denver Pioneers	NCAA
April 9, 2013	John Kurtz	Anaheim Ducks	Norfolk Admirals	AHL
April 11, 2013	Drew LeBlanc	Chicago Blackhawks	St. Cloud State Huskies	NCAA
April 12, 2013	Chad Ruhwedel	Buffalo Sabres	UMass Lowell River Hawks	NCAA
April 14, 2013	Eric Hartzell	Pittsburgh Penguins	Quinnipiac Bobcats	NCAA
April 15, 2013	Antoine Laganiere	Anaheim Ducks	Yale Bulldogs	NCAA
April 17, 2013	Andrew Miller	Edmonton Oilers	Yale Bulldogs	NCAA
April 17, 2013	Michael Kantor	New York Rangers	Sudbury Wolves	OHL
April 23, 2013	Mathieu Roy	Tampa Bay Lightning	Hamburg Freezers	DEL
May 1, 2013	Karl Stollery	Colorado Avalanche	Lake Erie Monsters	AHL
May 2, 2013	Joe Whitney	New Jersey Devils	Albany Devils	AHL
May 8, 2013	Mike Condon	Montreal Canadiens	Princeton Tigers	NCAA
May 12, 2013	Trevor Cheek	Colorado Avalanche	Edmonton Oil Kings	WHL
May 20, 2013	Mark Van Guilder	Nashville Predators	Milwaukee Admirals	AHL
May 21, 2013	Chris Bruton	New York Islanders	Peoria Rivermen	AHL
May 24, 2013	Ilari Melart	Columbus Blue Jackets	HIFK Hockey	SM-liiga
May 30, 2013	Anton Belov	Edmonton Oilers	Avangard Omsk	KHL
May 31, 2013	Maxim Lamarche	Philadelphia Flyers	Baie-Comeau Drakkar	QMJHL
May 31, 2013	Michael Raffl	Philadelphia Flyers	Leksands IF	SEL
June 2, 2013	Antti Raanta	Chicago Blackhawks	HC Assat Pori	SM-liiga
June 11, 2013	Petter Emanuelsson	San Jose Sharks	Skelleftea AIK	SEL
June 13, 2013	Reto Suri	Tampa Bay Lightning	EV Zug	NLA

== Trades ==
* - Following the 2012–13 NHL lockout each team was granted to have up to three contracts on their payroll where they have retained salary in a trade (i.e. the player no longer plays with Team A due to a trade to Team B, but Team A still retains some salary). Only up to 50% of a player's contract can be kept, and only up to 15% of a team's salary cap can be taken up by retained salary. A contract can only be involved in one of these trades twice.

=== June ===
June 22, 2012	To Columbus Blue Jackets Sergei Bobrovsky	To Philadelphia Flyers 2nd-round pick in 2012 (#45 - Anthony Stolarz)^{1} 4th-round pick in 2012 (#117 - Taylor Leier)^{2} PHX 4th-round pick in 2013 (Justin Auger)
June 22, 2012	To New York Islanders Lubomir Visnovsky	To Anaheim Ducks 2nd-round pick in 2013 (Nick Sorensen)
June 22, 2012	To Washington Capitals Mike Ribeiro	To Dallas Stars Cody Eakin; 2nd-round pick in 2012 (Mike Winther)
June 22, 2012	To Carolina Hurricanes Jordan Staal	To Pittsburgh Penguins Brandon Sutter; Brian Dumoulin; 1st-round pick in 2012 (Derrick Pouliot)
June 22, 2012	To Phoenix Coyotes Zbynek Michalek	To Pittsburgh Penguins Harrison Ruopp; Marc Cheverie; PHI 3rd-round pick in 2012 (Oskar Sundqvist)
June 23, 2012	To Tampa Bay Lightning Benoit Pouliot	To Boston Bruins Michel Ouellet; 5th-round pick in 2012 (#131 overall - Seth Griffith)
June 23, 2012	To Winnipeg Jets Jonas Gustavsson	To Toronto Maple Leafs conditional 7th-round pick in 2013^{a}
June 23, 2012	To Toronto Maple Leafs James van Riemsdyk	To Philadelphia Flyers Luke Schenn
June 27, 2012	To Calgary Flames Dennis Wideman	To Washington Capitals Jordan Henry; 5th-round pick in 2013 (#127 overall - Tucker Poolman)

1. Columbus previously acquired this pick as a result of a trade on February 22, 2012, that sent Antoine Vermette to Phoenix in exchange for Curtis McElhinney, a conditional fourth-round pick in the 2013 Entry Draft and this pick.
  Phoenix previously acquired this pick as a result of a trade on December 17, 2011, that sent Kyle Turris to Ottawa in exchange for David Rundblad and this pick.
2. Columbus previously acquired this pick as a result of a trade on February 27, 2012, that sent Samuel Pahlsson to Vancouver in exchange for a fourth-round pick in 2012 Entry Draft and this pick.

a.The condition was not fulfilled as Gustavsson signed with the Detroit Red Wings on July 1, 2012

Pick-only 2012 NHL entry draft trades
June 22, 2012	To Buffalo Sabres 1st-round pick in 2012 (#14 overall -Zemgus Girgensons)	To Calgary Flames NSH 1st-round pick in 2012 (#21 overall - Mark Jankowski); 2nd-round pick in 2012 (#42 overall - Patrick Sieloff)
June 23, 2012	To Nashville Predators 3rd-round pick in 2012 (#89 overall - Brendan Leipsic)	To New York Rangers 3rd-round pick in 2013 (#65 overall - Adam Tambellini)
June 23, 2012	To San Jose Sharks 4th-round pick in 2012 (#109 overall - Christophe Lalancette)	To Chicago Blackhawks TBL 7th-round pick in 2012 (#191 overall - Brandon Whitney); 4th-round pick in 2013 (#111 overall - Robin Norell)
June 23, 2012	To New York Rangers 5th-round pick in 2012 (#142 overall - Thomas Spelling)	To Nashville Predators 5th-round pick in 2013 (#140 overall - Teemu Kivihalme)
June 23, 2012	To Dallas Stars EDM 7th-round pick in 2012 (#183 overall - Dmitry Sinitsyn)	To Los Angeles Kings 7th-round pick in 2013 (#191 overall - Dominik Kubalik
June 23, 2012	To Florida Panthers 7th-round pick in 2012 (#194 overall - Jonatan Nielsen)	To Dallas Stars 7th-round pick in 2013 (#182 overall - Aleksi Makela)

=== July ===
July 1, 2012	To Columbus Blue Jackets Nick Foligno	To Ottawa Senators Marc Methot
July 2, 2012	To Dallas Stars Derek Roy	To Buffalo Sabres Steve Ott; Adam Pardy
July 10, 2012	To Tampa Bay Lightning B.J. Crombeen; 5th-round pick in 2014	To St. Louis Blues 4th-round pick in 2013; 4th-round pick in 2014
July 20, 2012	To Florida Panthers Casey Wellman	To New York Rangers 5th-round pick in 2014
July 23, 2012	To New York Rangers Rick Nash; Steven Delisle conditional 3rd-round pick	To Columbus Blue Jackets Brandon Dubinsky; Artem Anisimov; Tim Erixon; 1st-round pick in 2013

August to December

No trades due to the 2012–13 NHL lockout.

=== January ===
January 13, 2013	To Philadelphia Flyers Brian Boucher; Mark Alt	To Carolina Hurricanes Luke Pither
January 13, 2013	To Carolina Hurricanes Kevin Westgarth	To Los Angeles Kings Anthony Stewart; 4th-round pick in 2013 (#96 overall - Kyle Platzer); 6th-round pick in 2014
January 13, 2013	To Florida Panthers Brendon Nash	To Montreal Canadiens Jason DeSantis
January 13, 2013	To Edmonton Oilers Mark Fistric	To Dallas Stars 3rd-round pick in 2013 (#68 overall - Niklas Hansson)
January 16, 2013	To Phoenix Coyotes Matthew Lombardi*	To Toronto Maple Leafs conditional 4th-round pick in 2014
January 16, 2013	To New York Rangers Brandon Mashinter	To San Jose Sharks Tommy Grant conditional 7th-round pick in 2014
January 21, 2013	To Tampa Bay Lightning Jean-Francois Jacques	To Florida Panthers future considerations
January 21, 2013	To Chicago Blackhawks Henrik Karlsson	To Calgary Flames OTT 7th-round pick in 2013
January 24, 2013	To New York Rangers Benn Ferriero	To Pittsburgh Penguins Chad Kolarik
January 24, 2013	To Dallas Stars Carl Sneep	To Pittsburgh Penguins conditional FLA 7th-round pick in 2013
January 31, 2013	To Washington Capitals Casey Wellman	To Florida Panthers Zach Hamill
January 31, 2013	To Washington Capitals Peter LeBlanc	To Chicago Blackhawks future considerations

=== February ===
February 4, 2013	To Minnesota Wild Mike Rupp	To New York Rangers Darroll Powe; Nick Palmieri
February 6, 2013	To New Jersey Devils Andrei Loktionov	To Los Angeles Kings 5th-round pick in 2013
February 6, 2013	To Anaheim Ducks Ben Lovejoy	To Pittsburgh Penguins 5th-round pick in 2014
February 7, 2013	To New York Islanders Tim Thomas	To Boston Bruins conditional 2nd-round pick in 2014 or 2015
February 8, 2013	To Los Angeles Kings Keaton Ellerby	To Florida Panthers NJD 5th-round pick in 2013
February 13, 2013	To Winnipeg Jets Eric Tangradi	To Pittsburgh Penguins 7th-round pick in 2013
February 13, 2013	To New Jersey Devils Alexei Ponikarovsky	To Winnipeg Jets 7th-round pick in 2013; 4th-round pick in 2014
February 14, 2013	To Tampa Bay Lightning Cedrick Desjardins	To Montreal Canadiens Dustin Tokarski
February 19, 2013	To St. Louis Blues Jani Lajunen	To Nashville Predators Scott Ford
February 25, 2013	To Calgary Flames Mike Testwuide	To Philadelphia Flyers Mitch Wahl
February 26, 2013	To Philadelphia Flyers Simon Gagne	To Los Angeles Kings conditional 4th-round pick in 2013
February 26, 2013	To Dallas Stars Erik Cole	To Montreal Canadiens Michael Ryder; 3rd-round pick in 2013
February 28, 2013	To Calgary Flames Brian McGrattan	To Nashville Predators Joe Piskula

=== March ===
March 4, 2013	To Edmonton Oilers Mike Brown	To Toronto Maple Leafs conditional 4th-round pick in 2014
March 10, 2013	To Winnipeg Jets Tomas Kubalik	To Columbus Blue Jackets Spencer Machacek
March 11, 2013	To Tampa Bay Lightning Dan Sexton	To Anaheim Ducks Kyle Wilson
March 12, 2013	To Columbus Blue Jackets Matthew Ford	To Philadelphia Flyers future considerations
March 12, 2013	To Ottawa Senators Matt Kassian	To Minnesota Wild 6th-round pick in 2014
March 14, 2013	To Washington Capitals Chay Genoway	To Minnesota Wild conditional 7th-round pick in 2014
March 14, 2013	To Toronto Maple Leafs Kevin Marshall	To Washington Capitals Nicolas Deschamps
March 15, 2013	To Anaheim Ducks David Steckel	To Toronto Maple Leafs Ryan Lasch; 7th-round pick in 2014
March 15, 2013	To Florida Panthers T.J. Brennan	To Buffalo Sabres 5th-round pick in 2013
March 22, 2013	To New Jersey Devils Matt D'Agostini conditional 7th-round pick in 2015	To St. Louis Blues conditional 4th- or 5th-round pick in 2015
March 24, 2013	To Pittsburgh Penguins Brenden Morrow conditional EDM or MIN 3rd-round pick in 2013	To Dallas Stars Joe Morrow; 5th-round pick in 2013
March 25, 2013	To Pittsburgh Penguins Douglas Murray	To San Jose Sharks 2nd-round pick in 2013 conditional 2nd-round pick in 2014
March 28, 2013	To Pittsburgh Penguins Jarome Iginla	To Calgary Flames Kenny Agostino; Ben Hanowski; 1st-round pick in 2013
March 29, 2013	To Edmonton Oilers Kale Kessy	To Phoenix Coyotes Tobias Rieder
March 30, 2013	To Philadelphia Flyers Kent Huskins	To Detroit Red Wings conditional 7th-round pick in 2014
March 30, 2013	To St. Louis Blues Jordan Leopold	To Buffalo Sabres 2nd-round pick in 2013 conditional 4th- or 5th-round pick in 2013

=== April ===
April 1, 2013	To Philadelphia Flyers Jay Rosehill	To Anaheim Ducks Harry Zolnierczyk
April 1, 2013	To Chicago Blackhawks Michal Handzus	To San Jose Sharks SJS 4th-round pick in 2013
April 1, 2013	To Los Angeles Kings Robyn Regehr	To Buffalo Sabres 2nd-round pick in 2014; 2nd-round pick in 2015
April 1, 2013	To St. Louis Blues Jay Bouwmeester	To Calgary Flames Mark Cundari; Reto Berra conditional 1st-round pick in 2013 or 2014 conditional 4th-round pick in 2013
April 2, 2013	To Carolina Hurricanes Marc-Andre Bergeron	To Tampa Bay Lightning Adam Hall; 7th-round pick in 2013
April 2, 2013	To Vancouver Canucks Derek Roy	To Dallas Stars Kevin Connauton; 2nd-round pick in 2013
April 2, 2013	To Washington Capitals Joel Rechlicz	To Phoenix Coyotes Matt Clackson
April 2, 2013	To Boston Bruins Jaromir Jagr	To Dallas Stars Lane MacDermid; Cody Payne conditional 1st- or 2nd-round pick in 2013
April 2, 2013	To Edmonton Oilers Garrett Stafford	To Washington Capitals Dane Byers
April 2, 2013	To Montreal Canadiens Davis Drewiske	To Los Angeles Kings 5th-round pick in 2013
April 2, 2013	To Dallas Stars Cameron Gaunce	To Colorado Avalanche Tomas Vincour
April 2, 2013	To New York Rangers Ryane Clowe	To San Jose Sharks 2nd-round pick in 2013; FLA 3rd-round pick in 2013 conditional 2nd-round pick in 2014
April 2, 2013	To Tampa Bay Lightning Philippe Paradis	To Chicago Blackhawks Kirill Gotovets
April 3, 2013	To Chicago Blackhawks Maxime Sauve	To Boston Bruins Rob Flick
April 3, 2013	To San Jose Sharks Scott Hannan	To Nashville Predators conditional 6th- or 7th-round pick in 2013
April 3, 2013	To Edmonton Oilers Jerred Smithson	To Florida Panthers 4th-round pick in 2013
April 3, 2013	To Pittsburgh Penguins Jussi Jokinen*	To Carolina Hurricanes conditional 7th-round pick in 2013
April 3, 2013	To Tampa Bay Lightning Ben Bishop	To Ottawa Senators Cory Conacher; PHI 4th-round pick in 2013
April 3, 2013	To Philadelphia Flyers Steve Mason	To Columbus Blue Jackets Michael Leighton; 3rd-round pick in 2015
April 3, 2013	To Columbus Blue Jackets Marian Gaborik; Steven Delisle; Blake Parlett	To New York Rangers Derick Brassard; Derek Dorsett; John Moore; 6th-round pick in 2014
April 3, 2013	To Minnesota Wild Jason Pominville*; 4th-round pick in 2014	To Buffalo Sabres Matt Hackett; Johan Larsson; 1st-round pick in 2013; 2nd-round pick in 2014
April 3, 2013	To Columbus Blue Jackets Blake Comeau	To Calgary Flames 5th-round pick in 2013
April 3, 2013	To San Jose Sharks Raffi Torres	To Phoenix Coyotes FLA 3rd-round pick in 2013
April 3, 2013	To Toronto Maple Leafs Ryan O'Byrne	To Colorado Avalanche EDM 4th-round pick in 2014
April 3, 2013	To Boston Bruins Wade Redden	To St. Louis Blues conditional 7th-round pick in 2014
April 3, 2013	To Anaheim Ducks Matthew Lombardi	To Phoenix Coyotes Brandon McMillan
April 3, 2013	To New Jersey Devils Steve Sullivan	To Phoenix Coyotes 7th-round pick in 2014
April 3, 2013	To Minnesota Wild Jeff Deslauriers	To Anaheim Ducks future considerations
April 3, 2013	To Washington Capitals Martin Erat; Michael Latta	To Nashville Predators Filip Forsberg
April 3, 2013	To Columbus Blue Jackets Patrick Killeen	To Pittsburgh Penguins future considerations

=== June (2013) ===
June 6, 2013	To Dallas Stars Sergei Gonchar	To Ottawa Senators conditional 6th-round pick in 2013
June 12, 2013	To Philadelphia Flyers Mark Streit	To New York Islanders Shane Harper; 4th-round pick in 2014
June 14, 2013	To Florida Panthers Bobby Butler	To Nashville Predators T.J. Brennan
June 18, 2013	To Calgary Flames Corban Knight	To Florida Panthers 4th-round pick in 2013
June 23, 2013	To Toronto Maple Leafs Jonathan Bernier	To Los Angeles Kings Matt Frattin*; Ben Scrivens*; 2nd-round pick in 2014 or 2015
June 24, 2013	To Pittsburgh Penguins Harry Zolnierczyk	To Anaheim Ducks Alex Grant
June 27, 2013	To Colorado Avalanche Alex Tanguay; Cory Sarich	To Calgary Flames David Jones; Shane O'Brien

For details concerning conditional draft picks see the appropriate Entry Draft pages.

== Waivers ==
Once an NHL player has played in a certain number of games or a set number of seasons has passed since the signing of his first NHL contract (see here), that player must be offered to all of the other NHL teams before he can be assigned to a minor league affiliate.

Date	Player	New team	Previous team
January 14, 2013	Joe Finley	New York Islanders	Buffalo Sabres
January 15, 2013	Thomas Hickey	New York Islanders	Los Angeles Kings
January 15, 2013	Richard Clune	Nashville Predators	Los Angeles Kings
January 16, 2013	Anthony Peluso	Winnipeg Jets	St. Louis Blues
January 17, 2013	Keith Aucoin	New York Islanders	Toronto Maple Leafs
January 19, 2013	Brian Strait	New York Islanders	Pittsburgh Penguins
January 19, 2013	James Wright	Winnipeg Jets	Florida Panthers
January 25, 2013	Niko Hovinen	Edmonton Oilers	Philadelphia Flyers
January 31, 2013	Zach Boychuk	Pittsburgh Penguins	Carolina Hurricanes
January 31, 2013	Frazer McLaren	Toronto Maple Leafs	San Jose Sharks
February 5, 2013	Aaron Palushaj	Colorado Avalanche	Montreal Canadiens
February 11, 2013	Joey MacDonald	Calgary Flames	Detroit Red Wings
February 28, 2013	Aaron Volpatti	Washington Capitals	Vancouver Canucks
March 1, 2013	Tom Sestito	Vancouver Canucks	Philadelphia Flyers
March 4, 2013	Bobby Butler	Nashville Predators	New Jersey Devils
March 5, 2013	Zach Boychuk	Nashville Predators	Pittsburgh Penguins
March 6, 2013	Roman Hamrlik	New York Rangers	Washington Capitals
March 6, 2013	Tom Kostopoulos	New Jersey Devils	Pittsburgh Penguins
March 16, 2013	Adam Hall	Carolina Hurricanes	Tampa Bay Lightning
March 21, 2013	Zach Boychuk	Carolina Hurricanes	Nashville Predators
March 23, 2013	Jeff Halpern	Montreal Canadiens	New York Rangers
March 27, 2013	Kaspars Daugavins	Boston Bruins	Ottawa Senators
April 3, 2013	Mike Santorelli	Winnipeg Jets	Florida Panthers
April 3, 2013	Adam Hall	Philadelphia Flyers	Tampa Bay Lightning

== See also ==
- 2012 NHL entry draft
- 2013 NHL entry draft
- 2014 NHL entry draft
- 2012–13 NHL suspensions and fines
- 2012 in sports
- 2013 in sports
- 2011–12 NHL transactions
- 2013–14 NHL transactions
