= 2013–14 NHL suspensions and fines =

The following is a list of all suspensions and fines enforced in the National Hockey League during the 2013–14 NHL season. It lists which players or coaches of what team have been punished for which offense and the amount of punishment they have received.

Based on each player's average annual salary, divided by number of days in the season (195) for non-repeat offenders and games (82) for repeat offenders, salary will be forfeited for the term of their suspension. Players' money forfeited due to suspension or fine goes to the Players' Emergency Assistance Fund, while money forfeited by coaches, staff or organizations as a whole go to the NHL Foundation.

== Suspensions ==
† - suspension covered at least one 2013 NHL pre-season game

* - Incident happened in the pre-season, but the player was allowed to take part in the remainder of the pre-season before serving his suspension in the regular season.

‡ - suspension covered at least one 2014 post-season game

^{#} - Suspension was later reduced upon further review/successful appeal; information presented in italics.

Date of Incident	Offender	Team(s)	Offense(s)	Date of Action	Length	Salary Forfeited
September 15, 2013	Paul Bissonnette	Phoenix Coyotes	Automatic suspension for leaving the bench to initiate a fight with Jordan Nolan.	September 16, 2013; September 28, 2013	10 games*^{#} 3 games*	$37,820.51 U.S. $11,346.15 U.S.
September 17, 2013	Teemu Pulkkinen	Detroit Red Wings	Boarding Michael Kostka.	September 19, 2013	4 games† (4 preseason)	N/A
September 18, 2013	Adam Erne	Tampa Bay Lightning	Illegal check to the head of Vladimir Sobotka.	September 19, 2013	3 games† (3 preseason)	N/A
September 21, 2013	Dale Weise	Vancouver Canucks	Illegal check to the head of Taylor Hall.	September 23, 2013	3 games† (3 preseason)	N/A
September 21, 2013	Zack Kassian	Vancouver Canucks	High-sticking Sam Gagner.	September 23, 2013	8 games† (3 preseason + 5 regular season)	$22,307.69 U.S.
September 22, 2013	David Clarkson	Toronto Maple Leafs	Automatic suspension for leaving the bench to initiate a fight with John Scott.	September 23, 2013	10 games*	$269,230.80 U.S.
September 22, 2013	Phil Kessel	Toronto Maple Leafs	Slashing John Scott.	September 24, 2013	3 games† (3 preseason)	N/A
October 8, 2013	Brad Stuart	San Jose Sharks	Illegal check to the head of Rick Nash.	October 9, 2013	3 games	$55,384.62 U.S.
October 10, 2013	Alexander Edler	Vancouver Canucks	Illegal check to the head of Tomas Hertl.	October 11, 2013	3 games	$182,926.83 U.S.
October 10, 2013	Patrick Kaleta	Buffalo Sabres	Illegal check to the head of Jack Johnson.	October 15, 2013	10 games^{1}	$152,439.00 U.S.
October 15, 2013	Maxim Lapierre	St. Louis Blues	Boarding Dan Boyle.	October 18, 2013	5 games	$28,205.15 U.S.
October 17, 2013	Cody McLeod	Colorado Avalanche	Boarding Niklas Kronwall.	October 21, 2013	5 games	$29,487.20 U.S.
October 19, 2013	Michael Grabner	New York Islanders	Illegal check to the head of Nathan Gerbe.	October 21, 2013	2 games	$30,769.24 U.S.
October 20, 2013	Ryan Garbutt	Dallas Stars	Charging Dustin Penner.	October 23, 2013	5 games	$14,743.60 U.S.
October 23, 2013	John Scott	Buffalo Sabres	Illegal check to the head of Loui Eriksson.	October 31, 2013	7 games	$26,923.05 U.S.
October 26, 2013	Martin Hanzal	Phoenix Coyotes	Charging Jeff Petry.	October 28, 2013	2 games	$75,609.76 U.S.
October 30, 2013	Carter Ashton	Toronto Maple Leafs	Boarding Derek Smith.	November 1, 2013	2 games	$8,615.38 U.S.
November 7, 2013	Jesse Winchester	Florida Panthers	Elbowing Chris Kelly.	November 8, 2013	3 games	$9,230.76 U.S.
November 13, 2013	Nazem Kadri	Toronto Maple Leafs	Interference with goaltender Niklas Backstrom.	November 14, 2013	3 games	$44,615.37 U.S.
November 24, 2013	Kevin Westgarth	Carolina Hurricanes	Boarding Mark Borowiecki.	November 26, 2013	2 games	$7,435.90 U.S.
December 7, 2013	James Neal	Pittsburgh Penguins	Kneeing Brad Marchand.	December 9, 2013	5 games	$128,205.15 U.S.
December 7, 2013	Shawn Thornton	Boston Bruins	Aggressing Brooks Orpik.	December 14, 2013	15 games^{2}	$84,615.45 U.S.
December 8, 2013	Dion Phaneuf	Toronto Maple Leafs	Boarding Kevan Miller.	December 10, 2013	2 games	$66,666.66 U.S.
December 10, 2013	Jared Cowen	Ottawa Senators	Illegal check to the head of Zemgus Girgensons.	December 11, 2013	2 games	$31,794.88 U.S.
December 10, 2013	Richard Panik	Tampa Bay Lightning	Boarding Karl Alzner.	December 11, 2013	2 games	$7,589.74 U.S.
December 12, 2013	David Clarkson	Toronto Maple Leafs	Illegal check to the head of Vladimir Sobotka.	December 14, 2013	2 games	$128,048.78 U.S.
December 14, 2013	Anthony Peluso	Winnipeg Jets	Boarding Alex Goligoski.	December 15, 2013	3 games	$8,653.86 U.S.
December 14, 2013	Deryk Engelland	Pittsburgh Penguins	Illegal check to the head of Justin Abdelkader.	December 18, 2013	5 games	$14,529.90 U.S.
December 15, 2013	Corey Potter	Edmonton Oilers	Boarding Nick Bonino.	December 16, 2013	2 games	$7,948.72 U.S.
January 2, 2014	Derek MacKenzie	Columbus Blue Jackets	Boarding Oliver Ekman-Larsson.	January 3, 2014	3 games	$15,384.63 U.S.
January 4, 2014	Tyler Myers	Buffalo Sabres	Illegal check to the head of Dainius Zubrus.	January 6, 2014	3 games	$84,615.39 U.S.
January 18, 2014	John Tortorella (head coach)	Vancouver Canucks	Attempting to enter Calgary's locker room during the first intermission of the January 18 game vs. the Flames.	January 20, 2014	15 days (6 games)	$82,000 U.S.
February 8, 2014	Erik Johnson	Colorado Avalanche	Slashing Frans Nielsen.	February 11, 2014	2 games	$38,461.54 U.S.
March 1, 2014	Travis Hamonic	New York Islanders	Automatic suspension for instigating a fight during the final five minutes of a game.	March 1, 2014	1 game	$19,780.22 U.S.
March 2, 2014	Dmitry Orlov	Washington Capitals	Boarding Brayden Schenn.	March 3, 2014	2 games	$7,076.92 U.S.
March 6, 2014	Zack Kassian	Vancouver Canucks	Boarding Brenden Dillon.	March 7, 2014	3 games	$32,103.66 U.S.
March 9, 2014	Jordan Nolan	Los Angeles Kings	Punching an unsuspecting Jesse Joensuu.	March 10, 2014	1 game	$3,589.74 U.S.
March 11, 2014	Blake Comeau	Columbus Blue Jackets	Boarding Brendan Smith.	March 12, 2014	2 games	$10,256.42 U.S.
April 1, 2014	Douglas Murray	Montreal Canadiens	Illegal check to the head of Michael Kostka.	April 3, 2014	3 games	$23,076.93 U.S.
April 6, 2014	Zac Rinaldo	Philadelphia Flyers	Illegal check to the head of Chad Ruhwedel.	April 7, 2014	4 games	$15,384.60 U.S.
April 10, 2014	Mike Rupp	Minnesota Wild	Illegal check to the head of T.J. Oshie.	April 11, 2014	4 games‡ (1 regular season + 3 post-season)	$7,692.31 U.S.
April 19, 2014	Brent Seabrook	Chicago Blackhawks	Charging David Backes.	April 20, 2014	3 games‡	N/A
April 21, 2014	Matt Cooke	Minnesota Wild	Kneeing Tyson Barrie.	April 23, 2014	7 games‡	N/A
May 9, 2014	Brandon Bollig	Chicago Blackhawks	Boarding Keith Ballard.	May 10, 2014	2 games‡	N/A
May 15, 2014	Zenon Konopka	Buffalo Sabres	Violating the terms of the NHL/NHLPA Performance Enhancing Substances Program.	May 15, 2014	20 games^{3}	N/A
May 22, 2014	Daniel Carcillo	New York Rangers	Automatic suspension for abuse of official. (Physically applied force to linesman Scott Driscoll while being escorted to the penalty box.)	May 23, 2014; June 3, 2014	10 games‡^{#} 6 games	N/A
May 22, 2014	Brandon Prust	Montreal Canadiens	Interfering with Derek Stepan.	May 23, 2014	2 games‡	N/A
May 27, 2014	John Moore	New York Rangers	Illegal check to the head of Dale Weise.	May 28, 2014	2 games‡	N/A
Player Totals				174 games†‡ (16 preseason + 133 regular season + 25 post-season)		$1,704,746.00 U.S.

1. Suspension was appealed to Commissioner Gary Bettman who upheld the 10 game ruling.
2. Suspension was appealed to Mister Bettman who upheld the 15 game ruling.
3. Suspension will be served at the beginning of any new contract. The suspension is accompanied by mandatory referral to the NHL/NHLPA Program for Substance Abuse and Behavioral Health.

== Fines ==
Players can be fined up to 50% of one day's salary, up to a maximum of $10,000.00 U.S. for their first offense, and $15,000.00 U.S. for any subsequent offenses. Fines listed in italics indicate that was the maximum allowed fine.

Date of Incident	Offender	Team	Offense	Date of Action	Amount
September 22, 2013	Ron Rolston (head coach)	Buffalo Sabres	Player selection and team conduct in the September 22 game vs. the Maple Leafs.	September 24, 2013	$10,000.00 U.S.
October 2, 2013	Patrick Roy (head coach)	Colorado Avalanche	Actions following October 2 game vs. the Ducks.	October 3, 2013	$10,000.00 U.S.
October 8, 2013	Frans Nielsen	New York Islanders	Slashing Martin Hanzal.	October 9, 2013	$5,000.00 U.S.
October 14, 2013	Jason Chimera	Washington Capitals	Boarding Justin Schultz.	October 15, 2013	$4,487.18 U.S.
October 27, 2013	Kyle Clifford	Los Angeles Kings	Kneeing Ryan Nugent-Hopkins.	October 28, 2013	$2,756.41 U.S.
December 11, 2013	Brayden Schenn	Philadelphia Flyers	Cross-checking Kris Versteeg.	December 13, 2013	$2,230.77 U.S.
January 1, 2014	Joffrey Lupul	Toronto Maple Leafs	Cross-checking Patrick Eaves.	January 3, 2014	$10,000.00 U.S.
January 16, 2014	Martin Hanzal	Phoenix Coyotes	High-sticking David Booth.	January 17, 2014	$5,000.00 U.S.
January 18, 2014	Bob Hartley (head coach)	Calgary Flames	Placing Kevin Westgarth on the ice for the game-opening faceoff against the Canucks, in an attempt to start a premeditated fight with an unwilling opponent – the Canucks' Kevin Bieksa.	January 20, 2014	$25,000.00 U.S.
February 6, 2014	Alexei Emelin	Montreal Canadiens	Butt-ending Pascal Pelletier.	February 7, 2014	$5,000.00 U.S.
March 1, 2014	Jack Capuano (head coach)	New York Islanders	Automatic fine for Travis Hamonic instigating a fight during the final five minutes of a game.	March 1, 2014	$10,000.00 U.S.
March 20, 2014	David Legwand	Detroit Red Wings	Butt-ending Evgeni Malkin.	March 21, 2014	$5,000.00 U.S.
March 20, 2014	James Neal	Pittsburgh Penguins	Cross-checking Luke Glendening.	March 21, 2014	$5,000.00 U.S.
April 12, 2014	Ed Jovanovski	Florida Panthers	Elbowing Corey Tropp.	April 13, 2014	$5,000.00 U.S.
April 13, 2014	Scott Hartnell	Philadelphia Flyers	Spearing Brett Bellemore.	April 14, 2014	$5,000.00 U.S.
April 17, 2014	Joel Quenneville (head coach)	Chicago Blackhawks	Inappropriate conduct during the April 17th game against the St. Louis Blues.	April 18, 2014	$25,000.00 U.S.
April 18, 2014	Milan Lucic	Boston Bruins	Spearing Danny DeKeyser.	April 19, 2014	$5,000.00 U.S.
April 25, 2014	Ryan Garbutt	Dallas Stars	Spearing Corey Perry.	April 26, 2014	$1,474.36 U.S.
May 10, 2014	Shawn Thornton	Boston Bruins	Unsportsmanlike conduct (squirting P.K. Subban with water from the bench during play).	May 11, 2014	$2,820.52 U.S.
May 11, 2014	Henrik Lundqvist	New York Rangers	Unsportsmanlike conduct (squirting Sidney Crosby with water during a scrum).	May 12, 2014	$5,000.00 U.S.
Total				$148,769.24 U.S.	

== See also ==
- 2013 in sports
- 2014 in sports
- 2013 NHL entry draft
- 2013–14 NHL season
- 2013–14 NHL transactions
- 2013–14 NHL Three Star Awards
- 2012–13 NHL suspensions and fines
