= 2012–13 NHL suspensions and fines =

The following is a list of all suspensions and fines enforced in the National Hockey League during the 2012–13 NHL season. It lists which players or coaches of what team have been punished for which offense and the amount of punishment they have received. The season was shortened to 48 games due to the 2012–13 NHL lockout. No pre-season games were played.

== Suspensions ==
† - suspension carried over from 2011–12 NHL season

‡ - suspension covered at least one 2013 post-season game

Date of Incident	Offender	Team(s)	Offense(s)	Date of Action	Length
April 15, 2012	Arron Asham	Pittsburgh Penguins/New York Rangers	Cross-checking Brayden Schenn.	April 17, 2012	4 games† (3 PIT 2012 post-season + 1 NYR regular season)
April 17, 2012	Raffi Torres	Phoenix Coyotes	Late charge to the head of Marian Hossa.	April 21, 2012	25 games reduced to 21 games† (13 2012 post-season + 8 regular season)
January 22, 2013	Brayden Schenn	Philadelphia Flyers	Charging Anton Volchenkov.	January 23, 2013	1 game
January 29, 2013	Colin McDonald	New York Islanders	Boarding Ben Lovejoy.	January 30, 2013	2 games
February 1, 2013	John Erskine	Washington Capitals	Elbowing Wayne Simmonds.	February 2, 2013	3 games
February 19, 2013	Jannik Hansen	Vancouver Canucks	Roughing Marian Hossa.	February 20, 2013	1 game
February 21, 2013	Taylor Hall	Edmonton Oilers	Kneeing Cal Clutterbuck.	February 22, 2013	2 games
February 22, 2013	Ryane Clowe	San Jose Sharks	Leaving the bench to initiate a fight with Andrew Shaw.	February 25, 2013	2 games
March 2, 2013	Harry Zolnierczyk	Philadelphia Flyers	Charging Mike Lundin.	March 3, 2013	4 games
March 3, 2013	Patrick Kaleta	Buffalo Sabres	Boarding Brad Richards.	March 4, 2013	5 games
March 7, 2013	Brent Thompson	New York Islanders (assistant coach)	Verbal abuse towards an official.	March 8, 2013	2 games
March 12, 2013	Corey Perry	Anaheim Ducks	Illegal hit to Jason Zucker.	March 13, 2013	4 games
March 19, 2013	Eric Selleck	Florida Panthers	Instigator penalty in the last five minutes of a game. Leaving the bench to initiate a fight with Kevin Westgarth.	March 20, 2013	2 games (1 regular season + 1 regular season)
March 20, 2013	Joffrey Lupul	Toronto Maple Leafs	Illegal hit to the head of Victor Hedman.	March 21, 2013	2 games
March 21, 2013	Alexander Edler	Vancouver Canucks	Charging against a goaltender on Mike Smith.	March 22, 2013	2 games
March 29, 2013	Nate Thompson	Tampa Bay Lightning	Illegal hit to the head of Matt D'Agostini.	March 30, 2013	2 games
April 10, 2013	Anton Volchenkov	New Jersey Devils	Elbowing Brad Marchand.	April 11, 2013	4 games
April 15, 2013	Ryan White	Montreal Canadiens	Illegal hit to the head of Kent Huskins.	April 17, 2013	5 games
April 23, 2013	Dustin Brown	Los Angeles Kings	Elbowing Jason Pominville.	April 24, 2013	2 games
May 1, 2013	Andrew Ference	Boston Bruins	Illegal hit to the head of Mikhail Grabovski.	May 2, 2013	1 game‡
May 2, 2013	Eric Gryba	Ottawa Senators	Illegal hit to the head of Lars Eller.	May 3, 2013	2 games‡
May 4, 2013	Justin Abdelkader	Detroit Red Wings	Charging Toni Lydman.	May 5, 2013	2 games‡
May 14, 2013	Raffi Torres	San Jose Sharks	Illegal hit to the head of Jarret Stoll.	May 16, 2013	Remainder of 2nd round of playoffs‡ (6 games)
June 4, 2013	Duncan Keith	Chicago Blackhawks	High-sticking Jeff Carter.	June 5, 2013	1 game‡

== Fines ==
Fines were changed for this season such that players can be fined up to 50% of one day's salary, up to a maximum of $10,000.00 U.S. for their first offense, and $15,000.00 U.S. for any subsequent offenses. The previous maximum fine before this season was only $2500.00 U.S., for players.

Date of Incident	Offender	Team	Offense	Date of Action	Amount
February 5, 2013	Brandon Dubinsky	Columbus Blue Jackets	Boarding Rob Scuderi.	February 6, 2013	$10,000.00 U.S. (max.)
February 17, 2013	Devin Setoguchi	Minnesota Wild	High-sticking Kyle Quincey.	February 19, 2013	$8,108.11 U.S. (max.)
February 17, 2013	Mark Giordano	Calgary Flames	Slew-footing Antoine Roussel.	February 19, 2013	$10,000.00 U.S. (max.)
February 18, 2013	Rich Clune	Nashville Predators	Boarding Aaron Palushaj.	February 20, 2013	$1,452.70 U.S. (max.)
February 28, 2013	Jamie Benn	Dallas Stars	Cross-checking Ryan Jones.	March 2, 2013	$10,000.00 U.S. (max.)
March 23, 2013	Jordan Nolan	Los Angeles Kings	Cross-checking Henrik Sedin.	March 24, 2013	$1,436.94 U.S. (max.)
April 3, 2013	Marc-Edouard Vlasic	San Jose Sharks	Slashing Dany Heatley.	April 4, 2013	$8,378.38 U.S. (max.)
May 17, 2013	Team	San Jose Sharks	Fined in the wake of general manager Doug Wilson's comments following the May 16 suspension of Raffi Torres.	May 18, 2013	$100,000.00 U.S.
May 25, 2013	Jamal Mayers	Chicago Blackhawks	Shooting pucks into the Detroit Red Wings net during the pre-game warmup.	May 27, 2013	$1,600.00 U.S.
May 25, 2013	Team	Chicago Blackhawks	Fined in the wake of Jamal Mayers' actions during the pre-game warmup May 25.	May 28, 2013	$10,000.00 U.S.

== See also ==
- 2012–13 NHL transactions
- List of 2012–13 NHL Three Star Awards
- 2011–12 NHL suspensions and fines
- 2013–14 NHL suspensions and fines
- 2012 NHL entry draft
- 2012 in sports
- 2013 in sports
