= Blake Parlett =

Canadian ice hockey player (born 1989)

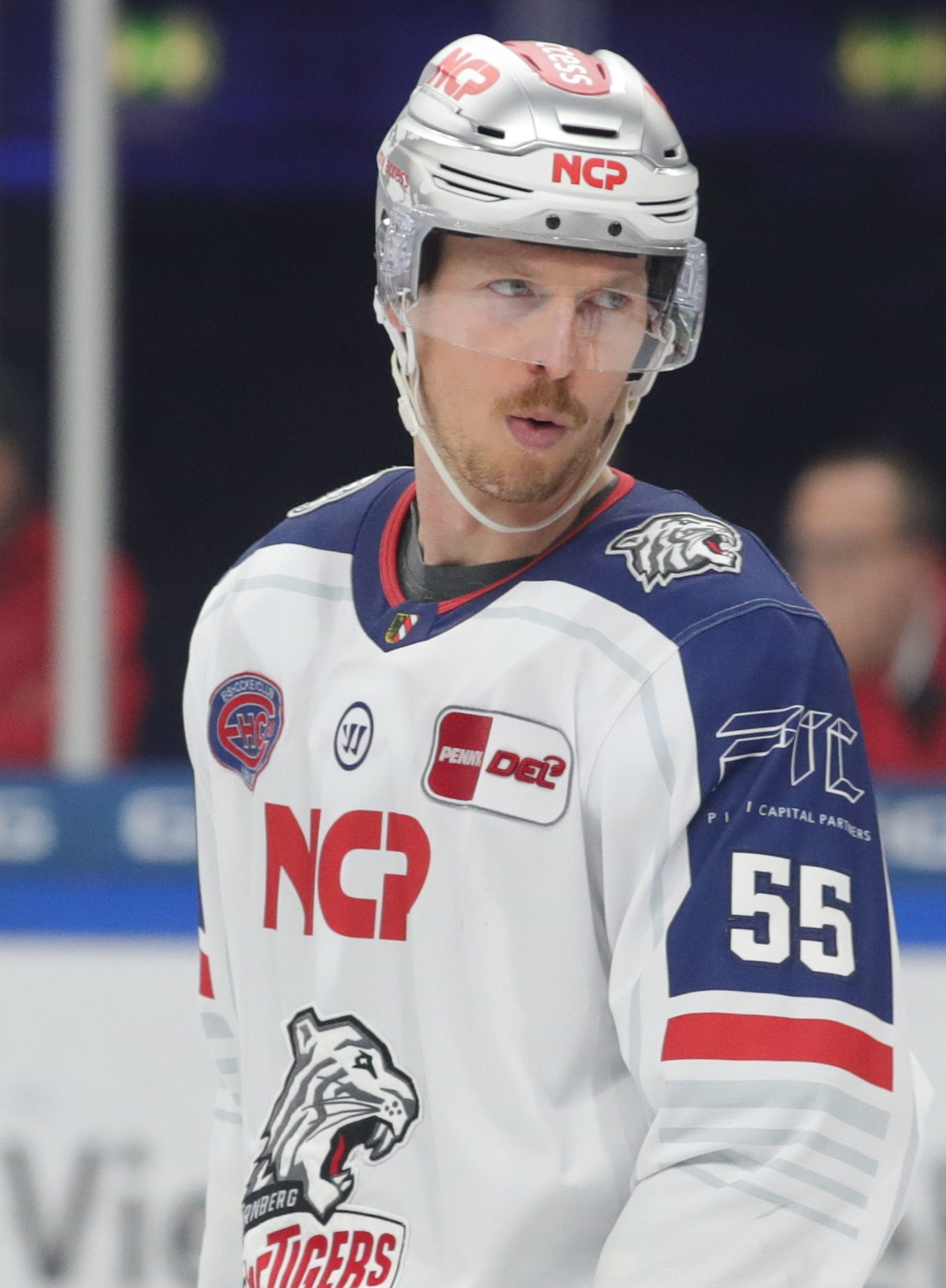
- Born: May 13, 1989 (age 37) Bracebridge, Ontario, Canada
- Height: 6 ft 1 in (185 cm)
- Weight: 205 lb (93 kg; 14 st 9 lb)
- Position: Defence
- Shoots: Right
- team Former teams: Free agent Connecticut Whale; Springfield Falcons; Providence Bruins; San Antonio Rampage; Medveščak Zagreb; Tappara; Eisbären Berlin; Kunlun Red Star; EHC München; Nürnberg Ice Tigers; HC Bolzano; HC Kosice
- NHL draft: Undrafted
- Playing career: 2010–present

Blake Parlett (born May 13, 1989) is a Canadian professional ice hockey player who is currently a free agent. He last played for HC Kosice of the Slovak Extraliga.

== Playing career ==
Parlett played major junior hockey in the Ontario Hockey League, the last as an overage player for Mississauga St. Michael's Majors. He turned professional with the Hartford Wolf Pack of the American Hockey League during the 2010–11 season.

Parlett split his first season between the Wolf Pack/Whale and ECHL affiliate, the Greenville Road Warriors, earning a starting position in the 2011 ECHL All-Star Game.

He was signed to a two-year entry-level contract by the Whale's parent club, the New York Rangers, on June 2, 2011.

During the 2012–13 season with the Connecticut Whale, Parlett was included, along with Steven Delisle, as part of the package in the deadline trade of Marian Gaborik from the Rangers to the Columbus Blue Jackets in exchange for Derick Brassard, Derek Dorsett, John Moore and a sixth-round pick on April 3, 2013. Parlett was immediately reassigned to AHL affiliate, the Springfield Falcons.

On February 7, 2014, Parlett was traded to the Boston Bruins in exchange for Carter Camper. and was assigned to the AHL affiliate, the Providence Bruins, for the remainder of the season.

On July 2, 2014, Parlett signed a one-year, two-way contract with the Florida Panthers. In the 2014–15 campaign, Parlett was assigned to AHL affiliate, the San Antonio Rampage, for the duration of the season.

On June 10, 2015, approaching free agency, and unable to break into the NHL, Parlett signed a one-year contract with Croatian KHL club, Medveščak. His Zagreb stint ended in early February 2017, when he signed with Finnish Liiga side Tappara.

Parlett inked an optional two-year deal with German Deutsche Eishockey Liga side Eisbären Berlin in June 2017. In the 2017–18 season, Parlett contributed with 17 points in 47 games to help Berlin reach the DEL finals.

On May 2, 2018, Parlett left Germany to return to the KHL in signing a one-year contract with Chinese outfit, Kunlun Red Star. In the 2018–19 season, Parlett contributed with 4 goals and 10 points in 32 games.

On June 25, 2019, Parlett continued his journeyman European career, signing for another stint in the DEL, agreeing to a one-year deal with EHC München. Parlett made 46 regular season appearances in Munich, posting 2 goals and 9 points, before the post-season was cancelled due to the COVID-19 pandemic.

Leaving Germany as a free agent, Parlett opted to continue his European career by returning to former club, Tappara of the Liiga, on July 31, 2020.

== Career statistics ==
			Regular season					Playoffs
Season	Team	League	GP	G	A	Pts	PIM	GP	G	A	Pts	PIM
2004–05	Huntsville Otters	OPJHL	48	4	12	16	56	—	—	—	—	—
2005–06	Barrie Colts	OHL	38	0	2	2	39	14	0	2	2	6
2006–07	Barrie Colts	OHL	36	1	5	6	47	—	—	—	—	—
2006–07	Windsor Spitfires	OHL	30	5	10	15	30	—	—	—	—	—
2007–08	Windsor Spitfires	OHL	33	3	3	6	10	—	—	—	—	—
2007–08	Mississauga St. Michael's Majors	OHL	28	0	7	7	53	4	0	0	0	8
2008–09	Mississauga St. Michael's Majors	OHL	68	8	26	34	74	10	0	2	2	13
2009–10	Mississauga St. Michael's Majors	OHL	68	11	35	46	108	16	1	4	5	18
2010–11	Greenville Road Warriors	ECHL	46	7	25	32	40	2	0	1	1	2
2010–11	Hartford Wolf Pack/CT Whale	AHL	24	2	10	12	17	6	1	2	3	2
2011–12	Connecticut Whale	AHL	55	4	10	14	38	—	—	—	—	—
2011–12	Greenville Road Warriors	ECHL	12	1	6	7	17	3	0	1	1	4
2012–13	Connecticut Whale	AHL	67	6	22	28	85	—	—	—	—	—
2012–13	Springfield Falcons	AHL	9	2	2	4	8	7	2	1	3	4
2013–14	Springfield Falcons	AHL	37	4	14	18	22	—	—	—	—	—
2013–14	Providence Bruins	AHL	25	0	5	5	9	11	2	4	6	4
2014–15	San Antonio Rampage	AHL	67	9	17	26	67	3	0	0	0	2
2015–16	KHL Medveščak Zagreb	KHL	38	0	7	7	113	—	—	—	—	—
2016–17	KHL Medveščak Zagreb	KHL	54	1	8	9	116	—	—	—	—	—
2016–17	Tappara	Liiga	10	0	0	0	2	18	5	3	8	18
2017–18	Eisbären Berlin	DEL	47	3	14	17	20	2	0	1	1	0
2018–19	Kunlun Red Star	KHL	32	4	6	10	10	—	—	—	—	—
2019–20	EHC München	DEL	46	2	7	9	46	—	—	—	—	—
2020–21	Tappara	Liiga	37	5	6	11	46	2	0	0	0	0
2021–22	Nürnberg Ice Tigers	DEL	44	5	9	14	80	3	0	2	2	0
2022–23	Nürnberg Ice Tigers	DEL	43	4	8	12	63	2	0	0	0	2
2023–24	HC Bolzano	ICEHL	48	2	11	13	56	12	0	3	3	0
AHL totals			284	27	80	107	246	27	5	7	12	12
