= Brian Connelly =

American ice hockey player (born 1986)

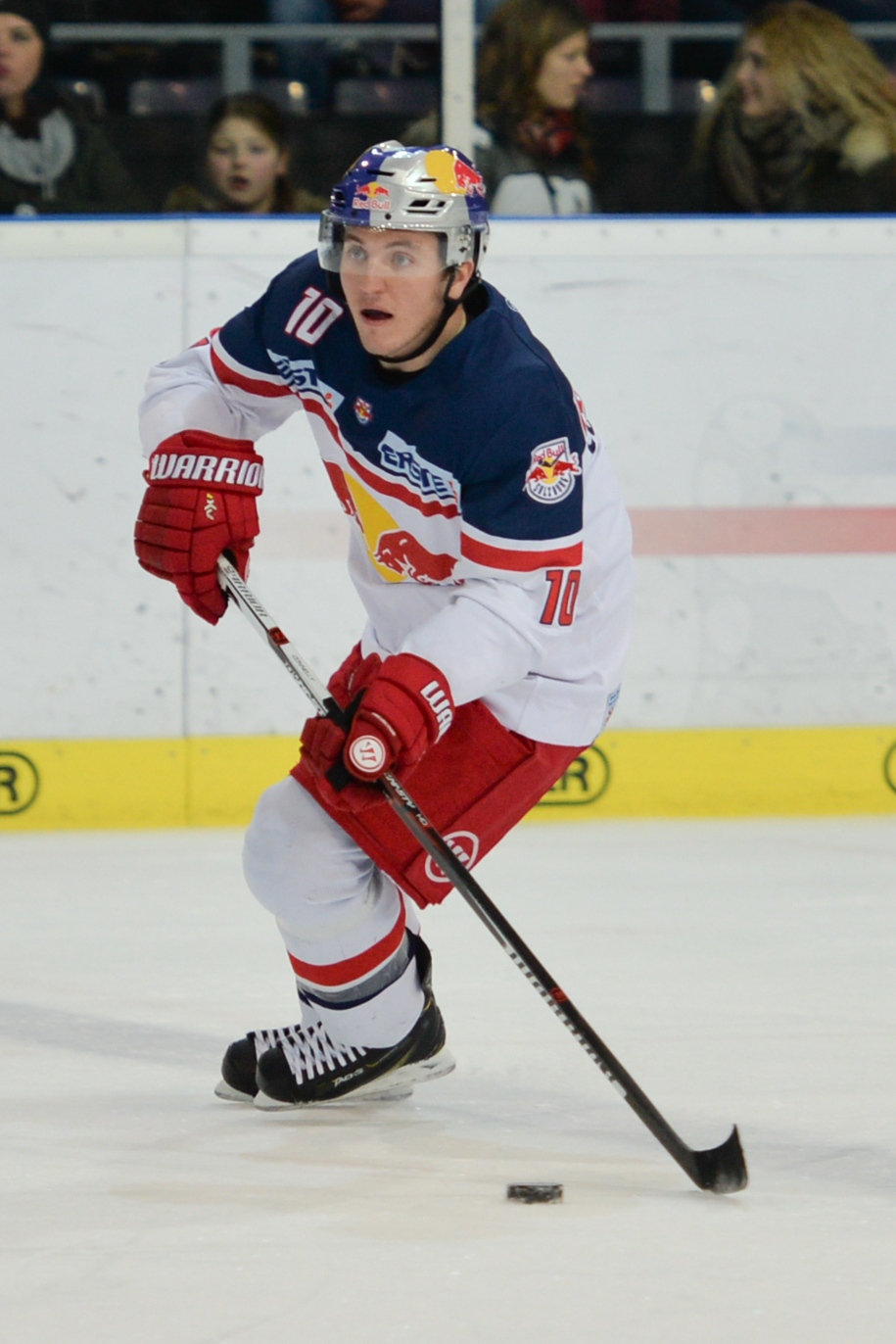
- Born: June 10, 1986 (age 40) Bloomington, Minnesota, U.S.
- Height: 5 ft 11 in (180 cm)
- Weight: 170 lb (77 kg; 12 st 2 lb)
- Position: Defense
- Shoots: Left
- AlpsHL team Former teams: EHC Lustenau; Rockford IceHogs; Abbotsford Heat; Houston Aeros; Iowa Wild; Leksands IF; EC Red Bull Salzburg; Dornbirner EC; Nottingham Panthers
- NHL draft: Undrafted
- Playing career: 2009–present

Brian Connelly (born June 10, 1986) is an American professional ice hockey defenseman currently contracted to EHC Lustenau of the Alps Hockey League (AlpsHL). Connelly previously iced with the Nottingham Panthers of the Elite Ice Hockey League (EIHL).

== Playing career ==
Connelly played collegiate hockey with Colorado College of the WCHA as a puck-moving offensive defenseman.

Undrafted due to his diminutive size, Connelly signed a contract with the Chicago Blackhawks of the NHL. In his first season with the Blackhawks' affiliate, the Rockford IceHogs, Connelly quickly developed as the main scoring presence on the IceHogs' defense. In the 2010–11 season, Connelly was selected and played in the 2011 AHL All-Star Game.

In the following 2011–12 season, in his third full season within the Blackhawks system and following his second consecutive AHL All-Star Game appearance, Connelly was traded to the Calgary Flames in exchange for veteran Brendan Morrison on February 27, 2012. He was then immediately assigned to the Flames' AHL affiliate, the Abbotsford Heat. In helping the Heat to the second round of the playoffs, Connelly finished with a combined 52 points, placing second in the AHL amongst defenseman to earn a position in the AHL Second All-Star Team.

On July 6, 2012, Connelly signed as a free agent to a two-year, two-way contract with the Minnesota Wild.

In the final year of his contract in the 2013–14 season, on February 26, 2014, Connelly was traded by the Wild in a return to the Chicago Blackhawks in exchange for Brad Winchester.

On July 11, 2014, Connelly signed as a free agent to a one-year contract with Leksands IF of the Swedish Hockey League. He endured a disappointing debut European season in 2014–15 with Leksands, contributing with only 2 goals and 12 points in 48 games.

In hopes of a rebound, Connelly left Leksands to sign a one-year contract with Austrian club Champions, EC Red Bull Salzburg of the Austrian Hockey League (EBEL) on May 29, 2015.

Connelly played four seasons in the EBEL before leaving as a free agent to sign a one-year deal with English club, the Nottingham Panthers of the EIHL, on June 18, 2019.

On June 24, 2020, Connelly left Nottingham to sign for AlpsHL side EHC Lustenau.

== Career statistics ==
			Regular season					Playoffs
Season	Team	League	GP	G	A	Pts	PIM	GP	G	A	Pts	PIM
2004–05	Tri-City Storm	USHL	20	0	3	3	12	9	0	1	1	2
2005–06	Tri-City Storm	USHL	54	3	9	12	16	5	1	0	1	0
2006–07	Colorado College Tigers	WCHA	35	2	15	17	22	—	—	—	—	—
2007–08	Colorado College Tigers	WCHA	41	3	16	19	32	—	—	—	—	—
2008–09	Colorado College Tigers	WCHA	38	3	24	27	46	—	—	—	—	—
2008–09	Rockford IceHogs	AHL	9	1	2	3	6	3	0	0	0	2
2009–10	Rockford IceHogs	AHL	78	4	31	35	28	4	0	3	3	2
2010–11	Rockford IceHogs	AHL	80	11	41	52	39	—	—	—	—	—
2011–12	Rockford IceHogs	AHL	44	5	31	36	16	—	—	—	—	—
2011–12	Abbotsford Heat	AHL	28	1	15	16	10	8	0	2	2	8
2012–13	Houston Aeros	AHL	54	5	34	39	14	5	1	3	4	4
2013–14	Iowa Wild	AHL	50	5	27	32	18	—	—	—	—	—
2013–14	Rockford IceHogs	AHL	16	3	5	8	4	—	—	—	—	—
2014–15	Leksands IF	SHL	48	2	10	12	10	—	—	—	—	—
2015–16	EC Red Bull Salzburg	EBEL	51	2	25	27	28	18	1	5	6	12
2016–17	Dornbirner EC	EBEL	36	3	21	24	20	—	—	—	—	—
2017–18	Dornbirner EC	EBEL	54	4	38	42	30	6	0	0	0	2
2018–19	Dornbirner EC	EBEL	52	2	23	25	22	—	—	—	—	—
2019–20	Nottingham Panthers	EIHL	46	5	19	24	20	—	—	—	—	—
2020–21	EHC Lustenau	AlpsHL	36	1	32	33	37	9	0	6	6	6
2020–21	EHC Lustenau	Austria2	—	—	—	—	—	4	1	4	5	4
AHL totals			359	35	186	221	135	20	1	8	9	16
