= Brandon DeFazio =

Canadian ice hockey player (born 1988)

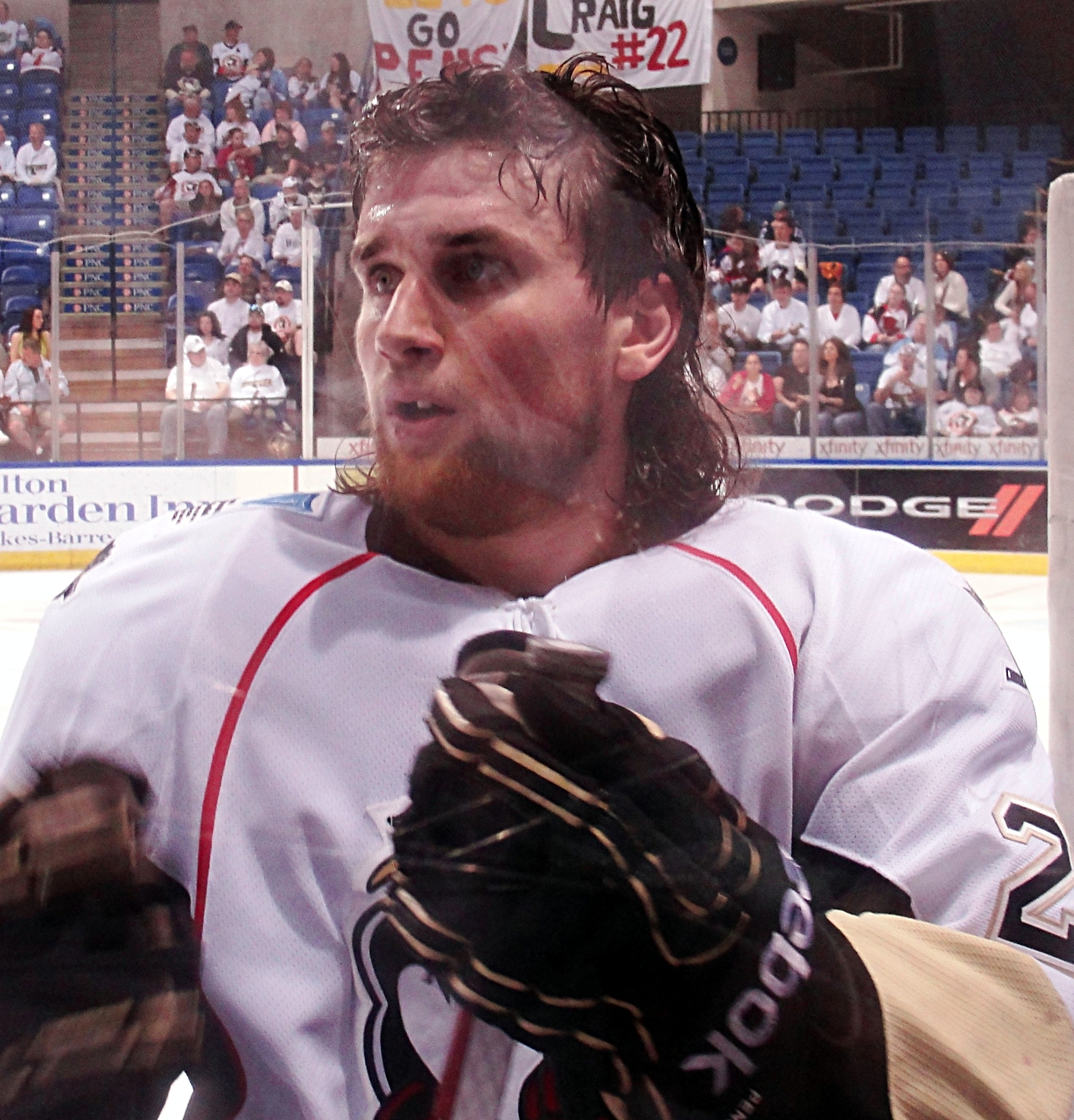
- Born: September 13, 1988 (age 38) Oakville, Ontario, Canada
- Height: 6 ft 1 in (185 cm)
- Weight: 215 lb (98 kg; 15 st 5 lb)
- Position: Left wing
- Shot: Left
- Played for: Vancouver Canucks; Kunlun Red Star; Lukko; HC Kometa Brno; ERC Ingolstadt; Schwenninger Wild Wings
- NHL draft: Undrafted
- Playing career: 2011–2023

Brandon DeFazio (born September 13, 1988) is a retired Canadian professional ice hockey player. He most recently played for Schwenninger Wild Wings of the Deutsche Eishockey Liga (DEL).

== Playing career ==
Before turning professional, DeFazio attended Clarkson University where he played four seasons of NCAA Division I men's ice hockey with the Clarkson Golden Knights men's ice hockey team. After graduating from his senior year with Clarkson, DeFazio joined the Pittsburgh Penguins affiliate teams, the Wheeling Nailers of the ECHL and the Wilkes-Barre/Scranton Penguins to end the 2010–11 season.

Wilkes-Barre signed DeFazio to a one-year AHL contract and was also given a try-out and attended Pittsburgh's NHL training camp for the 2011–12 season.

On July 2, 2012, DeFazio signed as a free agent to a one-year, two-way contract with the New York Islanders. A year later, though, DeFazio left the Islanders organization as a free agent and signed a one-year contract with the Vancouver Canucks on July 12, 2013.

In the 2014–15 season, DeFazio received his first NHL recall by the Canucks on November 9, 2014. He made his long-awaited NHL debut that night in a 2–1 shootout victory over the Anaheim Ducks. DeFazio played in his second career game on November 11 against the Ottawa Senators, where he collected the first shot of his career while playing 5 minutes and 49 seconds.

On July 6, 2015, having left the Canucks as a free agent, DeFazio returned to the Eastern Conference by signing a one-year, two-way contract with the Boston Bruins.

In the off-season, DeFazio left the Bruins organization as a free agent and on July 25, 2016, he was signed to a one-year contract to continue in the AHL with the Texas Stars. In the 2016–17 season, DeFazio compiled a career-best 47 points in appearing in every regular season game with Texas.

After 6 seasons largely in the AHL, DeFazio as a free agent agreed to a one-year deal with Chinese club, HC Kunlun Red Star of the Kontinental Hockey League (KHL) on June 6, 2017.

DeFazio left Kunlun for the following 2018–19 season, signing a year contract with Lukko of the Finnish Liiga, before returning for a second stint with Kunlun for the 2019–20 season.

As a free agent during the COVID-19 pandemic, DeFazio was later signed to a contract with the Czech Extraliga club, HC Kometa Brno, on November 17, 2020. Scoreless in 6 games with Brno in the 2020–21 season, DeFazio left the ELH to be the final addition to German DEL club, ERC Ingolstadt, on December 5, 2020.

On June 9, 2022, DeFazio signed as a free agent to a one-year contract with fellow German club, Schwenninger Wild Wings, for the 2022–23 season. DeFazio featured in every regular season game with the Wild Wings, collecting 10 goals and 21 points. Unable to help Schwenninger advance to the post-season, it was announced DeFazio would leave the club after his contract on March 9, 2023.

== Post-playing career ==
DeFazio ended his 13-year professional career and became a scout for the Pittsburgh Penguins on August 30, 2023, where he primarily scouts amateur junior players in his native Ontario.

== Personal life ==
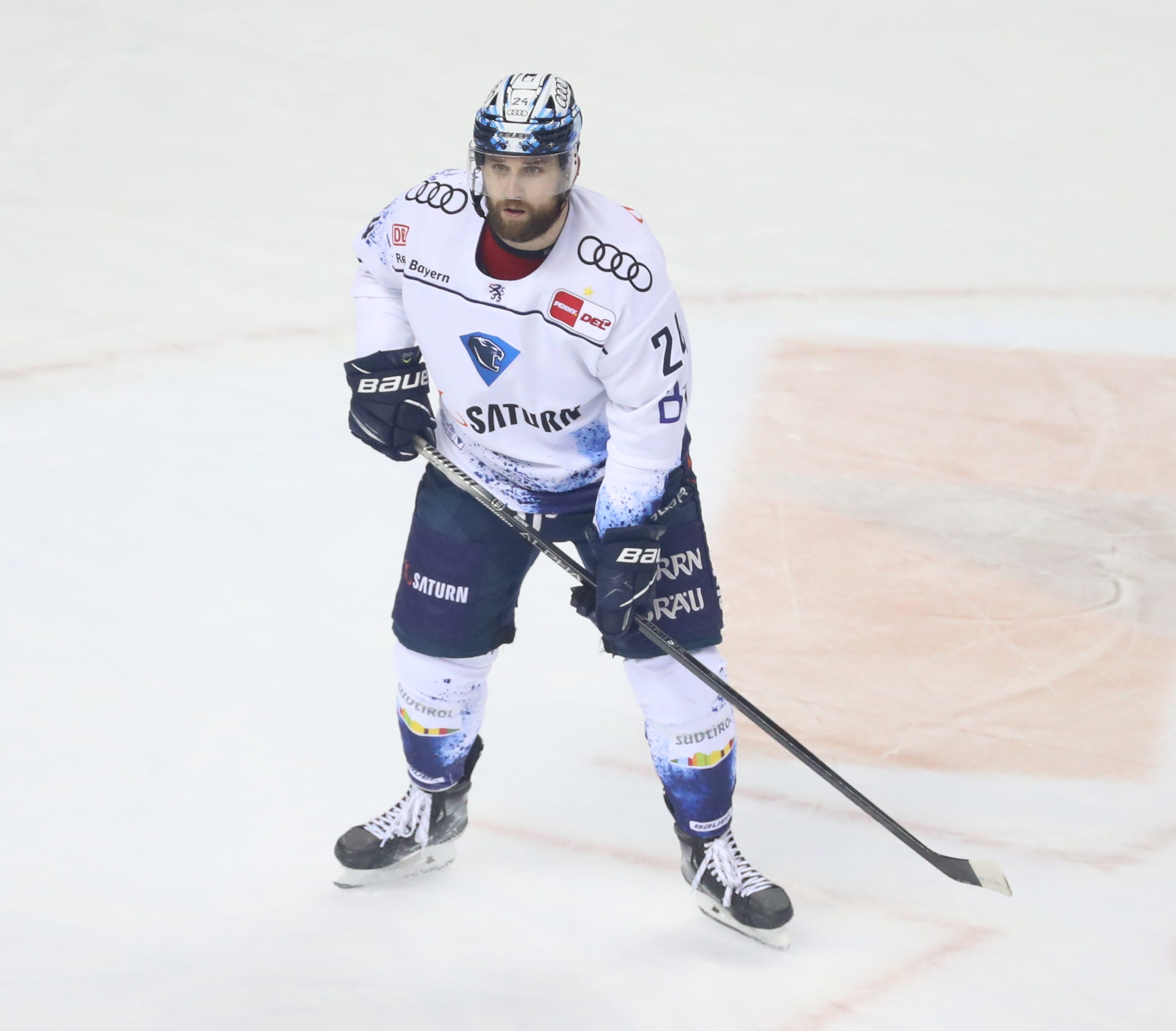
DeFazio with ERC Ingolstadt in 2021.

His father, Dean DeFazio, also played professional hockey within the Penguins organization. DeFazio was recognized for his work in the community, earning his AHL team's, man of the year award, multiple times. He is also currently married with one baby girl and a second child on the way.

== Career statistics ==
			Regular season					Playoffs
Season	Team	League	GP	G	A	Pts	PIM	GP	G	A	Pts	PIM
2005–06	Milton Icehawks	OPJHL	36	10	6	16	38	—	—	—	—	—
2005–06	Oakville Blades	OPJHL	11	2	11	13	8	23	6	13	19	28
2006–07	Oakville Blades	OPJHL	46	12	33	45	135	9	2	4	6	12
2007–08	Clarkson University	ECAC	37	3	4	7	34	—	—	—	—	—
2008–09	Clarkson University	ECAC	33	7	11	18	28	—	—	—	—	—
2009–10	Clarkson University	ECAC	35	12	14	26	58	—	—	—	—	—
2010–11	Clarkson University	ECAC	36	14	12	26	56	—	—	—	—	—
2010–11	Wheeling Nailers	ECHL	10	4	5	9	7	14	4	2	6	8
2010–11	Wilkes-Barre/Scranton Penguins	AHL	2	0	0	0	0	—	—	—	—	—
2011–12	Wilkes-Barre/Scranton Penguins	AHL	66	11	5	16	104	12	0	0	0	6
2012–13	Bridgeport Sound Tigers	AHL	69	11	14	25	139	—	—	—	—	—
2013–14	Utica Comets	AHL	76	17	17	34	106	—	—	—	—	—
2014–15	Utica Comets	AHL	75	21	22	43	92	21	2	5	7	12
2014–15	Vancouver Canucks	NHL	2	0	0	0	0	—	—	—	—	—
2015–16	Providence Bruins	AHL	71	22	21	43	38	3	0	0	0	4
2016–17	Texas Stars	AHL	76	22	25	47	45	—	—	—	—	—
2017–18	Kunlun Red Star	KHL	55	10	5	15	84	—	—	—	—	—
2018–19	Lukko	Liiga	59	19	21	40	78	6	2	0	2	8
2019–20	Kunlun Red Star	KHL	47	2	4	6	12	—	—	—	—	—
2020–21	HC Kometa Brno	ELH	6	0	0	0	2	—	—	—	—	—
2020–21	ERC Ingolstadt	DEL	37	13	8	21	83	4	1	0	1	2
2021–22	ERC Ingolstadt	DEL	55	21	17	38	51	2	1	0	1	2
2022–23	Schwenninger Wild Wings	DEL	56	10	11	21	36	—	—	—	—	—
NHL totals			2	0	0	0	0	—	—	—	—	—
