= Jesse Winchester (ice hockey) =

Canadian ice hockey player

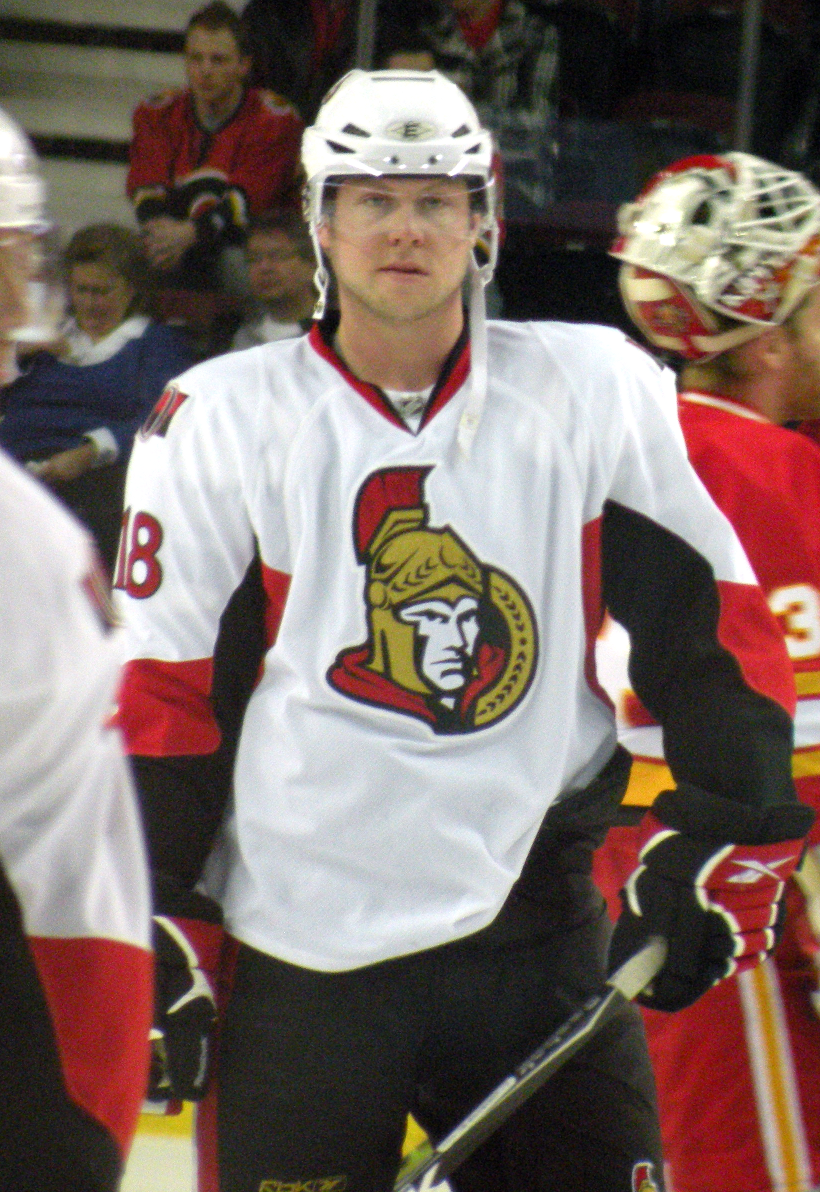
- Born: October 4, 1983 (age 42) Long Sault, Ontario, Canada
- Height: 6 ft 1 in (185 cm)
- Weight: 215 lb (98 kg; 15 st 5 lb)
- Position: Centre
- Shot: Right
- Played for: Ottawa Senators; Jokerit; Florida Panthers
- NHL draft: Undrafted
- Playing career: 2008–2016

Graham Jesse Winchester (born October 4, 1983) is a Canadian former professional ice hockey player. After graduating from Colgate University in 2008, Winchester turned professional, signing with the Ottawa Senators. He also played professional ice hockey with Jokerit of Finland and the Florida Panthers during his career, which lasted from 2008 to 2014.

== Playing career ==
Winchester was born in Long Sault, Ontario. He played junior hockey with the Cornwall Colts of the Central Junior A Hockey League, and was then offered a full hockey scholarship, and he subsequently played four seasons of NCAA Division I hockey with Colgate University. He was an ECAC All-Star in 2007–08 as well as Colgate's team captain. On March 25, 2008, after graduating from Colgate, Winchester signed with the NHL's Ottawa Senators and began his pro career.

Winchester made his NHL debut with Ottawa in the 2007–08 season, playing in a single game against the Boston Bruins on March 29, 2008, registering no points and two penalty minutes. Due to stipulations in the league's collective bargaining agreement, Winchester was ineligible to play in the 2008 NHL playoffs. He then made the Senators lineup out of training camp in 2008–09, though a recurring shoulder injury hampered Winchester throughout his rookie NHL season.

Winchester re-signed with the Senators on July 3, 2010, to a two-year deal. In the 2011–12 season, Winchester suffered a serious concussion injury in late December 2011 after a hit from Buffalo’s Paul Gaustad which sidelined him for most of the season. He finally returned to the Ottawa lineup on April 1, 2012, coincidentally the same game in which the Senators clinched a playoff spot.

With the 2012 NHL lockout affecting his status as a free agent, Winchester signed a lockout contract with TuTo of the Finnish Mestis on November 13, 2012. After scoring 10 points in 11 games and with limited NHL interest, Winchester opted to remain in Finland and was elevated to the SM-liiga club, Jokerit for the remainder of the 2012–13 season on January 27, 2013.

On July 5, 2013, Winchester marked his return to the NHL in signing a one-year contract with the Florida Panthers. In the 2013–14 season, Winchester made an impression on as a defensive forward who killed penalties for the Panthers. He also contributed offensively to post a career high 9 goals and 18 points in 52 games.

On July 1, 2014, Winchester was signed as a free agent to a two-year contract with the Colorado Avalanche. In the 2014–15 pre-season, Winchester suffered a concussion after a hit from Dennis Wideman of the Calgary Flames. Although initially optimistic on recovery, Winchester's symptoms persisted until he was cleared to travel with the team on March 27, 2015. Winchester suffered a setback after training with the club, and was effectively ruled out from the remainder of the season preventing him from making his Avalanche debut.

In the lead up to the 2015–16 season, Winchester was cleared in full to participate in the Avalanche's training camp. However upon resumption of full training, Winchester's concussion symptoms flared up prior to pre-season games and he was again placed on the injury reserve, ruled out indefinitely. By November, Winchester had left the team and returned home to continue his recovery effectively marking the end of his tenure without ever appearing with the Avalanche.

== Career statistics ==
=== Regular season and playoffs ===
			Regular season					Playoffs
Season	Team	League	GP	G	A	Pts	PIM	GP	G	A	Pts	PIM
2002–03	Cornwall Colts	CCHL	44	21	47	68	50	—	—	—	—	—
2003–04	Cornwall Colts	CCHL	54	23	59	82	62	—	—	—	—	—
2004–05	Colgate University	ECAC	28	2	2	4	22	—	—	—	—	—
2005–06	Colgate University	ECAC	37	14	22	36	31	—	—	—	—	—
2006–07	Colgate University	ECAC	37	16	21	37	52	—	—	—	—	—
2007–08	Colgate University	ECAC	40	8	29	37	51	—	—	—	—	—
2007–08	Ottawa Senators	NHL	1	0	0	0	2	—	—	—	—	—
2008–09	Ottawa Senators	NHL	76	3	15	18	33	—	—	—	—	—
2009–10	Ottawa Senators	NHL	52	2	11	13	22	6	0	0	0	0
2009–10	Binghamton Senators	AHL	4	2	2	4	0	—	—	—	—	—
2010–11	Ottawa Senators	NHL	72	4	9	13	42	—	—	—	—	—
2011–12	Ottawa Senators	NHL	32	2	6	8	22	4	0	0	0	0
2012–13	TuTo	FIN-2	11	3	7	10	58	—	—	—	—	—
2012–13	Jokerit	SM-l	5	0	3	3	2	—	—	—	—	—
2013–14	Florida Panthers	NHL	52	9	9	18	38	—	—	—	—	—
NHL totals			285	20	50	70	159	10	0	0	0	0

== Awards and honours ==
Award	Year
All-ECAC Hockey Second Team	2006–07
All-ECAC Hockey Third Team	2007–08

== Transactions ==
- March 28, 2008 - Signed as a free agent by the Ottawa Senators.
- May 29, 2008 - Signed a two-year contract with Ottawa Senators.
- July 3, 2010 - Signed a two-year contract with Ottawa Senators
- November 13, 2012 - Signed a contract with TuTo of Finnish Mestis league
- January 25, 2013 - Transferred to Jokerit of Finnish SM-liiga league
- July 5, 2013 - Signed a one-year contract with Florida Panthers
- July 1, 2014 - Signed a two-year contract with Colorado Avalanche
