= Acquavella =

Acquavella may refer to:

- Acquavella (surname), a surname
- Acquavella Galleries, New York gallery
