= 2010 NCAA Division I men's ice hockey tournament =

- Teams: 16
- Finals site: Ford Field, Detroit, Michigan
- Champions: Boston College Eagles (4th title)
- Runner-up: Wisconsin Badgers (9th title game)
- Semifinalists: Miami RedHawks (2nd Frozen Four); RIT Tigers (1st Frozen Four)
- Winning coach: Jerry York (4th title)
- MOP: Ben Smith (Boston College)
- Attendance: 37,592 (Championship); 107,500 (Frozen Four); 171,795 (Tournament)

The 2010 NCAA Division I men's ice hockey tournament involved 16 schools in single-elimination play to determine the national champion of men's NCAA Division I college ice hockey. The tournament began on March 26, 2010, and ended with the championship game on April 10, in which Boston College defeated Wisconsin 5–0 to win its fourth national championship.

Since the adoption of the 16-team playoff with the 2003 tournament, RIT became the first team to ever reach the Frozen Four in their first tournament appearance. As of 2026, they remain the only team to do so.

== Procedure ==
2010 Regionals (blue) and Frozen Four (red)

The four regionals are officially named after their geographic areas. The following are the sites for the 2010 regionals:

March 26 and 27
East Regional, Times Union Center – Albany, New York (Hosts: ECAC Hockey League and Rensselaer Polytechnic Institute)
West Regional, Xcel Energy Center – St. Paul, Minnesota (Host: University of Minnesota)

March 27 and 28
Midwest Regional, Allen County War Memorial Coliseum – Fort Wayne, Indiana (Host: University of Notre Dame)
Northeast Regional, DCU Center – Worcester, Massachusetts (Host: College of the Holy Cross)

April 8 and 10
Ford Field – Detroit, Michigan (Hosts: Central Collegiate Hockey Association and the Detroit Metro Sports Commission)

== Qualifying teams ==
The at-large bids and seeding for each team in the tournament were announced on March 21, 2010. The Central Collegiate Hockey Association (CCHA) and Western Collegiate Hockey Association (WCHA) each had four teams receive a berth in the tournament, Hockey East had three teams receive a berth, College Hockey America (CHA) and ECAC Hockey had two berths each, and Atlantic Hockey had one team receive a berth.

Midwest Regional – Fort Wayne						East Regional – Albany					
Seed	School	Conference	Record	Berth type	Last Bid	Seed	School	Conference	Record	Berth type	Last Bid
1	Miami (1)	CCHA	27–7–7	At-large bid	2009	1	Denver (2)	WCHA	27–9–4	At-large bid	2009
2	Bemidji State	CHA	23–9–4	At-large bid	2009	2	Cornell	ECAC Hockey	21–8–4	Tournament champion	2009
3	Michigan	CCHA	25–17–1	Tournament champion	2009	3	New Hampshire	Hockey East	17–13–7	At-large bid	2009
4	Alabama–Huntsville	CHA	12–17–3	Tournament champion	2007	4	RIT	Atlantic Hockey	26–11–1	Tournament champion	Never
West Regional – St. Paul						Northeast Regional – Worcester					
Seed	School	Conference	Record	Berth type	Last Bid	Seed	School	Conference	Record	Berth type	Last Bid
1	Wisconsin (3)	WCHA	25–10–4	At-large bid	2008	1	Boston College (4)	Hockey East	25–10–3	Tournament champion	2008
2	St. Cloud State	WCHA	23–13–5	At-large bid	2008	2	North Dakota	WCHA	25–12–5	Tournament champion	2009
3	Northern Michigan	CCHA	20–12–8	At-large bid	1999	3	Yale	ECAC Hockey	20–9–3	At-large bid	2009
4	Vermont	Hockey East	17–14–7	At-large bid	2009	4	Alaska*	CCHA	18–11–9	At-large bid	Never

Number in parentheses denotes overall seed in the tournament.
* Alaska participation in the tournament was later vacated due to NCAA violations found during a 2014 investigation.

== Bracket ==
Regional Semifinals; March 26–27
1	Miami (1)	2
4	Alabama–Huntsville	1
Midwest – Fort Wayne – Sat/Sun
2	Bemidji State	1
3	Michigan	5
1	Boston College (4)	3
4	Alaska	1
Northeast – Worcester – Sat/Sun
2	North Dakota	2
3	Yale	3
1	Denver (2)	1
4	RIT	2
East – Albany – Fri/Sat
2	Cornell	2
3	New Hampshire	6
1	Wisconsin (3)	3
4	Vermont	2
West – St. Paul – Fri/Sat
2	St. Cloud State	4**
3	Northern Michigan	3

Regional Finals; March 27–28
1	Miami (1)	3**
3	Michigan	2
1	Boston College (4)	9
3	Yale	7
4	RIT	6
3	New Hampshire	2
1	Wisconsin (3)	5
2	St. Cloud State	3

National Semifinals; April 8
MW1	Miami (1)	1
NE1	Boston College (4)	7
E4	RIT	1
W1	Wisconsin (3)	8

National Championship; April 10
NE1	Boston College (4)	5
W1	Wisconsin (3)	0

The number in parentheses denotes overall seed in the tournament
(*) denotes overtime period(s)

== Results ==
=== Midwest Regional – Fort Wayne, Indiana ===
==== Regional Semifinals ====
March 27, 2010; 4:00 pm	(1) Miami	2–1 (1–0, 1–0, 0–1)	(4) Alabama–Huntsville	War Memorial Coliseum

Game reference

Cody Reichard
Goalies
Cam Talbot
Referees:
Steve Marofsky
Ryan Sweeney
Linesmen:
Chris Woodwerth
Fred Riley

(Camper, Wideman) Curtis McKenzie – PP – 10:24	1 – 0
(McKenzie) Cameron Schilling – GW PP – 26:06	2 – 0
	2 – 1	59:21 – EA PP – Brennan Barker (Desmet, Cseter)

12 min
Penalties
20 min
38
Shots
17

March 27, 2010; 7:30 pm	(2) Bemidji State	1–5 (0–1, 0–1, 1–3)	(3) Michigan	War Memorial Coliseum; Attendance: 4,133

Game reference

Dan Bakala
Goalies
Shawn Hunwick
Referees:
John Gravelese
Jeff Bunyon
Linesmen:
Chris Aughe
Bob Bernard

	0 – 1	06:15 – Luke Glendening (Langlais, Kampfer)
	0 – 2	39:22 – GW – Louie Caporusso (Brown, Lebler)
(Read) Ian Lowe – PP – 50:24	1 – 2
	1 – 3	52:24 – Carl Hagelin (Lynch, Langlais)
	1 – 4	56:03 – SH – Carl Hagelin (Rust, Kampfer)
	1 – 5	58:02 – EN – Brian Lebler (Hagelin, Rust)

12 min
Penalties
20 min
27
Shots
31

==== Regional Final ====
March 28, 2010; 8:00 pm	(1) Miami	3–2 (2OT) (1–1, 1–1, 0–0, 0–0, 1–0)	(3) Michigan	War Memorial Coliseum; Attendance: 3,204

Game reference

Connor Knapp
Goalies
Shawn Hunwick
Referees:
John Gravelese
Jeff Bunyon
Linesmen:
Chris Aughe
Bob Bernard

(McKenzie, Camper) Pat Cannone – PP – 12:08	1 – 0
	1 – 1	13:42 – David Wohlberg (Glendening, Kampfer)
	1 – 2	20:49 – PP – Chad Langlais (Kampfer, Caporusso)
(McKenzie, Camper) Pat Cannone – PP – 23:18	2 – 2
(Vogelhuber) Alden Hirschfeld – GW – 81:54	3 – 2

14 min
Penalties
14 min
35
Shots
57

The regional final between Michigan and Miami was not without controversy. In the first overtime, Michigan appeared to score what would have been the game-winning goal when Kevin Lynch scored on a rebound in a scrum in front of the Miami net. However, after a video review, the goal was disallowed as the play had been whistled dead before the goal was scored to assess a Miami penalty. NCAA Director of Officials Steve Piotrowski clarified that officials blew the whistle as Lynch touched the puck, with a Miami player touching the puck in the crease and the puck briefly stopped underneath Miami goalie Connor Knapp, both occurring before the goal. The game continued until Miami sophomore Alden Hirschfeld scored 1:54 into double overtime, securing the 3-2 RedHawk victory.

=== East Regional – Albany, New York ===
==== Regional Semifinals ====
March 26, 2010; 3:00 pm	(1) Denver	1–2 (0–1, 0–0, 1–1)	(4) RIT	Times Union Center

Game reference

Marc Cheverie
Goalies
Jared DeMichiel
Referees:
Matt Shegos
Mark Wilkins
Linesmen:
Tony Molina
Bruce Vida

	0 – 1	05:02 – Chris Tanev (unassisted)
	0 – 2	52:36 – GW PP – Cameron Burt (Favot, Ringwald)
(Ruegsegger, Wiercioch) Joe Colborne – PP – 54:34	1 – 2

4 min
Penalties
6 min
40
Shots
25

March 26, 2010; 6:30 pm	(2) Cornell	2–6 (1–0, 0–2, 1–4)	(3) New Hampshire	Times Union Center; Attendance: 4,073

Game reference

Ben Scrivens
Goalies
Brian Foster
Referees:
Derek Shepherd
Marco Hunt
Linesmen:
Dan Carey
Bob Keltie

(Devin) Tyler Roeszler – 19:11	1 – 0
	1 – 1	36:47 – Bobby Butler (unassisted)
	1 – 2	37:13 – Mike Sislo (Burke, Kessel)
	1 – 3	42:52 – GW – Paul Thompson (Butler, DeSimone)
	1 – 4	46:36 – Bobby Butler (Thompson, DeSimone)
	1 – 5	55:14 – Mike Sislo (LeBlanc, Burke)
(Nash, Ross) Dan Nicholls – 57:49	2 – 5
	2 – 6	59:27 – EN – Paul Thompson (Kessel)

2 min
Penalties
4 min
26
Shots
37

==== Regional Final ====
March 27, 2010; 6:30 pm	(3) New Hampshire	2–6 (1–1, 0–3, 1–2)	(4) RIT	Times Union Center; Attendance: 3,737

Game reference

Brian Foster
Goalies
Jared DeMichiel
Referees:
Derek Shepherd
Marco Hunt
Linesmen:
Dan Carey
Bob Keltie

	0 – 1	14:10 – Chris Haltigin (Mazzei, Favot)
(Kostolansky, Kipp) Phil DeSimone – 19:01	1 – 1
	1 – 2	33:23 – Tyler Brenner (Favot, Ringwald)
	1 – 3	33:36 – GW – Brent Alexin (Haltigin, Saracino)
	1 – 4	34:57 – Steven Matic (Murphy, Burt)
	1 – 5	50:01 – Tyler Brenner (unassisted)
(Kostolansky) Blake Kessel – 57:31	2 – 5
	2 – 6	58:06 – EN – Tyler Mazzei (Favot)

12 min
Penalties
6 min
26
Shots
33

=== West Regional – St. Paul, Minnesota ===
==== Regional Semifinals ====
March 26, 2010; 8:40 pm	(1) Wisconsin	3–2 (1–2, 2–0, 0–0)	(4) Vermont	Xcel Energy Center; Attendance: 7,281

Game reference

Scott Gudmandson
Goalies
Rob Madore
Referees:
Chip McDonald
Peter Feola
Linesmen:
Dave Brown
Glen Cooke

(Geoffrion, Stepan) Justin Schultz – PP – 05:51	1 – 0
	1 – 1	07:22 – Dan Lawson (Miller)
	1 – 2	15:54 – PP – Brian Roloff (Stålberg, Lawson)
(Stepan, B. Smith) Michael Davies – PP – 24:02	2 – 2
(Schultz, B. Smith) Blake Geoffrion – GW PP – 39:16	3 – 2

16 min
Penalties
18 min
42
Shots
29

March 26, 2010; 4:30 pm	(2) St. Cloud State	4–3 (2OT) (2–1, 1–1, 0–1, 0–0, 1–0)	(3) Northern Michigan	Xcel Energy Center

Game reference

Mike Lee
Goalies
Brian Stewart
Referees:
Tim Benedetto
Kevin Shea
Linesmen:
Chris Federico
Tim Low

(LeBlanc) Travis Novak – 08:14	1 – 0
(Roe, Raboin) Ryan Lasch – PP – 12:25	2 – 0
	2 – 1	14:04 – PP – Justin Florek (Brown, Gustafsson)
(Lasch, Marvin) Garrett Roe – PP – 32:52	3 – 1
	3 – 2	36:12 – Ray Kaunisto (unassisted)
	3 – 3	56:11 – Erik Spady (Oliver, Florek)
(Roe, LeBlanc) Tony Mosey – GW PP – 80:23	4 – 3

12 min
Penalties
16 min
54
Shots
45

==== Regional Final ====
March 27, 2010; 8:00 pm	(1) Wisconsin	5–3 (3–1, 0–0, 2–2)	(2) St. Cloud St.	Xcel Energy Center; Attendance: 7,182

Game reference

(out 15:21) Mike Lee
(in 15:21) Dan Dunn
Goalies
Scott Gudmandson
Referees:
Tim Benedetto
Kevin Shea
Linesmen:
Chris Federico
Tim Lowe

(Bohmbach, Murray) John Mitchell – 02:31	1 – 0
(McDonagh, C. Smith) Blake Geoffrion – 13:18	2 – 0
	2 – 1	14:48 – Jared Festler (Lasch, Marvin)
(C. Smith, Geoffrion) Jake Gardiner – 15:21	3 – 1
	3 – 2	24:16 – SH – Jared Festler (unassisted)
(Bohmbach, Gardiner) John Mitchell – GW – 46:54	4 – 2
	4 – 3	57:10 – EA – Tony Mosey (Eddy)
(Geoffrion) Aaron Bendickson – EN – 58:52	5 – 3

20 min
Penalties
16 min
44
Shots
29

=== Northeast Regional – Worcester, Massachusetts ===
==== Regional Semifinals ====
March 27, 2010; 1:30 pm	(1) Boston College	3–1 (1–0, 0–1, 2–0)	(4) Alaska	DCU Center; Attendance: 6,572

Game reference

John Muse
Goalies
Scott Greenham
Referees:
Todd Anderson
Brad Shepherd
Linesmen:
Tony Czech
Matt Ulwelling

(Price, Shea) Matt Lombardi – SH – 08:54	1 – 0
	1 – 1	37:32 – PP – Andy Taranto (Knelsen, Sova)
(Carey, Alber) Pat Mullane – GW – 43:46	2 – 1
(unassisted) Matt Price – EN – 59:48	3 – 1

10 min
Penalties
10 min
32
Shots
29

March 27, 2010; 5:00 pm	(2) North Dakota	2–3 (0–1, 0–2, 2–0)	(3) Yale	DCU Center; Attendance: 6,572

Game reference

Brad Eidsness
Goalies
Ryan Rondeau
Referees:
Brian Hill
Steve McInchak
Linesmen:
T.J. Likens
Paul Tunison

	0 – 1	05:48 – Denny Kearney (Dignard)
	0 – 2	32:49 – Denny Kearney (Limbert, O'Neill)
	0 – 3	37:46 – GW – Mark Arcobello (O'Neill)
(unassisted) Brett Hextall – 42:59	1 – 3
(unassisted) Matt Frattin – 45:58	2 – 3

10 min
Penalties
14 min
36
Shots
23

==== Regional Final ====
March 28, 2010; 5:30 pm	(1) Boston College	9–7 (2–1, 4–3, 3–3)	(3) Yale	DCU Center; Attendance: 6,054

Game reference

John Muse
Goalies
Ryan Rondeau (out 30:46)
Billy Blase (in 30:46, out 44:16)
Jeff Malcolm (in 44:16)
Referees:
Todd Anderson
Brad Shepherd
Linesmen:
Tony Czech
Matt Ulwelling

(Atkinson) Brian Gibbons – 05:21	1 – 0
	1 – 1	13:32 – Brian O'Neill (Arcobello, Miller)
(unassisted) Carl Sneep – SH – 16:34	2 – 1
(Mullane, Shea) Joe Whitney – 22:23	3 – 1
	3 – 2	24:46 – PP – Mark Arcobello (Miller, Martin)
(unassisted) Cam Atkinson – 24:57	4 – 2
(Gibbons, Whitney) Cam Atkinson – 30:29	5 – 2
(Smith) Joe Whitney – 34:46	6 – 2
	6 – 3	37:10 – Mark Arcobello (Peel, O'Neill)
	6 – 4	38:27 – PP – Denny Kearney (Martin)
(Whitney) Cam Atkinson – 44:16	7 – 4
(Shea, Smith) Jimmy Hayes – GW – 46:53	8 – 4
(Samuelsson) Jimmy Hayes – 47:16	9 – 4
	9 – 5	53:32 – PP – Mark Arcobello (O'Neill, Miller)
	9 – 6	55:55 – Brian O'Neill (Arcobello)
	9 – 7	58:38 – EA – Broc Little (Arcobello, Miller)

18 min
Penalties
14 min
39
Shots
39

=== Frozen Four – Detroit, Michigan ===
==== National Semifinals ====
April 8, 2010; 5:00 pm	(W1) Wisconsin	8–1 (2–0, 4–1, 2–0)	(E4) RIT	Ford Field; Attendance: 34,954

Game reference

Scott Gudmandson
Goalies
Jared DeMichiel (out 54:55)
Jan Ropponen (in 54:55, out 57:27)
Shane Madolora (in 57:27)
Referees:
Tim Benedetto
Jeff Bunyon
Linesmen:
Chris Aughe
Bob Bernard

(Goloubef, Schultz) John Mitchell – 01:27	1 – 0
(McDonagh) Derek Stepan – GW – 09:38	2 – 0
(Bendickson) Jordy Murray – 22:18	3 – 0
(B. Smith, Stepan) Justin Schultz – PP – 24:26	4 – 0
(B. Smith, Geoffrion) Michael Davies – PP – 31:15	5 – 0
(B. Smith, Stepan) Blake Geoffrion – PP – 33:24	6 – 0
	6 – 1	39:32 – PP – Tyler Brenner (Ringwald, Favot)
(Bohmbach, B. Smith) Craig Smith – 47:28	7 – 1
(Street, B. Smith) Derek Stepan – 47:48	8 – 1

10 min
Penalties
29 min
37
Shots
14

April 8, 2010; 8:30 pm	(MW1) Miami	1–7 (0–1, 0–2, 1–4)	(NE1) Boston College	Ford Field; Attendance: 34,954

Game reference

(out 23:08) Connor Knapp
(in 23:08) Cody Reichard
Goalies
John Muse
Referees:
Derek Shepherd
Marco Hunt
Linesmen:
Tony Czech
Matt Ulwelling

	0 – 1	18:32 – PP – Ben Smith (J. Whitney, S. Whitney)
	0 – 2	22:06 – GW PP – Jimmy Hayes (Mullane, Dumoulin)
	0 – 3	23:08 – Joe Whitney (Dumoulin, Gibbons)
(Camper, Hirschfeld) Joe Hartman – 45:19	1 – 3
	1 – 4	50:10 – Cam Atkinson (Gibbons, Whitney)
	1 – 5	50:44 – Patch Alber (Smith, Dumoulin)
	1 – 6	51:45 – Paul Carey (Shea, Mullane)
	1 – 7	56:21 – Ben Smith (Hayes, Kreider)

14 min
Penalties
8 min
18
Shots
30

==== National Championship ====
April 10, 2010; 7:00 pm	(W1) Wisconsin	0–5 (0–1, 0–0, 0–4)	(NE1) Boston College	Ford Field; Attendance: 37,592

Game reference
Referees: Matt Shegos; Mark Wilkins; Linesmen: Bruce Vida; Tony Molina

Scoring summary
Period	Team	Goal	Assist(s)	Time	Score
1st	BC	Ben Smith (16) – GW PP	S. Whitney and J. Whitney	12:57	1–0 BC
2nd	None				
3rd	BC	Cam Atkinson (29)	J. Whitney and Gibbons	41:38	2–0 BC
3rd	BC	Chris Kreider (15)	Hayes and Samuelsson	43:40	3–0 BC
3rd	BC	Cam Atkinson (30) – PP	Gibbons and J. Whitney	47:20	4–0 BC
3rd	BC	Matt Price (5) – EN	unassisted	55:29	5–0 BC
Penalty summary
Period	Team	Player	Penalty	Time	PIM
1st	BC	Joe Whitney	Interference	1:17	2:00
1st	WIS	Ryan McDonagh	Cross–checking	5:24	2:00
1st	WIS	John Mitchell	Contact to the head – Elbowing	11:04	2:00
2nd	WIS	Jake Gardiner	Interference	23:16	2:00
2nd	BC	Joe Whitney	Clipping	24:21	2:00
3rd	WIS	Craig Smith	Contact to the head – Elbowing	46:32	2:00
3rd	WIS	Podge Turnbull	Contact to the head	47:20	2:00
3rd	BC	Joe Whitney	Unsportsmanlike conduct	50:19	2:00
3rd	BC	Brian Gibbons	Slashing	57:52	2:00
3rd	WIS	Craig Smith	Slashing	57:52	2:00

Shots by period
Team	1	2	3	T
Boston College	12	6	8	26
Wisconsin	5	9	6	20

Goaltenders
Team	Name	Saves	Goals against	Time on ice
BC	John Muse	20	0	60:00
WIS	Scott Gudmandson	20	4	58:41

== Record by conference ==
Conference	# of Bids	Record	Win %	Regional Finals	Frozen Four	Championship Game	Champions
CCHA	4	3–4	.429	2	1	–	–
WCHA	4	4–4	.500	2	1	1	–
Hockey East	3	5–2	.714	2	1	1	1
CHA	2	0–2	.000	–	–	–	–
ECAC Hockey	2	1–2	.333	1	–	–	–
Atlantic Hockey	1	2–1	.667	1	1	–	–

== Media ==
=== Television ===
ESPN had US television rights to all games during the tournament. For the sixth consecutive year ESPN aired every game, beginning with the regionals, on ESPN, ESPN2, and ESPNU, and ESPN360.

==== Broadcast Assignments ====
Regionals

- East Regional: John Buccigross & Barry Melrose – Albany, New York
- West Regional: Clay Matvick & Jim Paradise – St. Paul, Minnesota
- Midwest Regional: Ben Holden & Sean Ritchlin – Fort Wayne, Indiana
- Northeast Regional: Dan Parkhurst & Damian DiGiulian – Worcester, Massachusetts

Frozen Four & Championship

- Gary Thorne, Barry Melrose, & Clay Matvick – Detroit, Michigan

=== Radio ===
Westwood One used exclusive radio rights to air both the semifinals and the championship, AKA the "Frozen Four.

- Sean Grande & Cap Raeder

== Tournament awards ==
=== East Regional ===
==== All-East Regional Team ====
- Goaltender: Jared DeMichiel (RIT)
- Defensemen: Chris Haltigin (RIT), Dan Ringwald (RIT)
- Forwards: Tyler Brenner (RIT), Cameron Burt (RIT), Bobby Butler (New Hampshire)

==== Most Outstanding Player ====
- Jared DeMichiel (RIT)

=== West Regional ===
==== All-West Regional Team ====
- Goaltender: Scott Gudmandson (Wisconsin)
- Defensemen: Ryan McDonagh (Wisconsin), Brendan Smith (Wisconsin)
- Forwards: Blake Geoffrion (Wisconsin), Garrett Roe (St. Cloud State), Tony Mosey (St. Cloud State)

==== MOP ====
- Blake Geoffrion (Wisconsin)

=== Frozen Four ===
- G: John Muse (Boston College)
- D: Brian Dumoulin (Boston College)
- D: Brendan Smith (Wisconsin)
- F: Cam Atkinson (Boston College)
- F: Ben Smith* (Boston College)
- F: Joe Whitney (Boston College)

* Most Outstanding Player(s)
