= Westminster School (Connecticut) =

Private school in Simsbury, Connecticut, US

Coordinates: 41.8869°N 72.7968°W

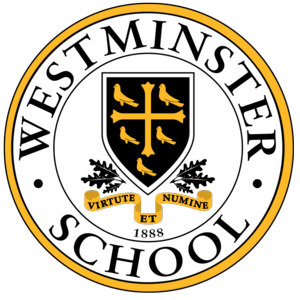

Location
- 995 Hopmeadow St; Simsbury, Connecticut 06070; United States

Information
- Type: Private, Boarding, Day
- Motto: Virtute et Numine (Grit and Grace)
- Established: 1888 (138 years ago)
- Founder: William Lee Cushing
- CEEB code: 070680
- Head of school: Elaine B. White
- Faculty: 95
- Enrollment: 400
- Student to teacher ratio: 5:1
- Campus size: 210 acres
- Colors: Black and gold
- Athletics conference: Founders League
- Mascot: Martlet
- Endowment: $100,500,000
- Tuition: $62,475 Boarding, $47,225 Day
- Website: westminster-school.org

The Westminster School is a private, coeducational college-preparatory, boarding and day school in Simsbury, Connecticut, United States. It accepts around 20% of applicants. In 2018, its roughly 400 students came from 25 US states and 30 countries. It is a member of the Founders League, an athletic league of ten boarding schools in Connecticut and one in New York.

== History ==
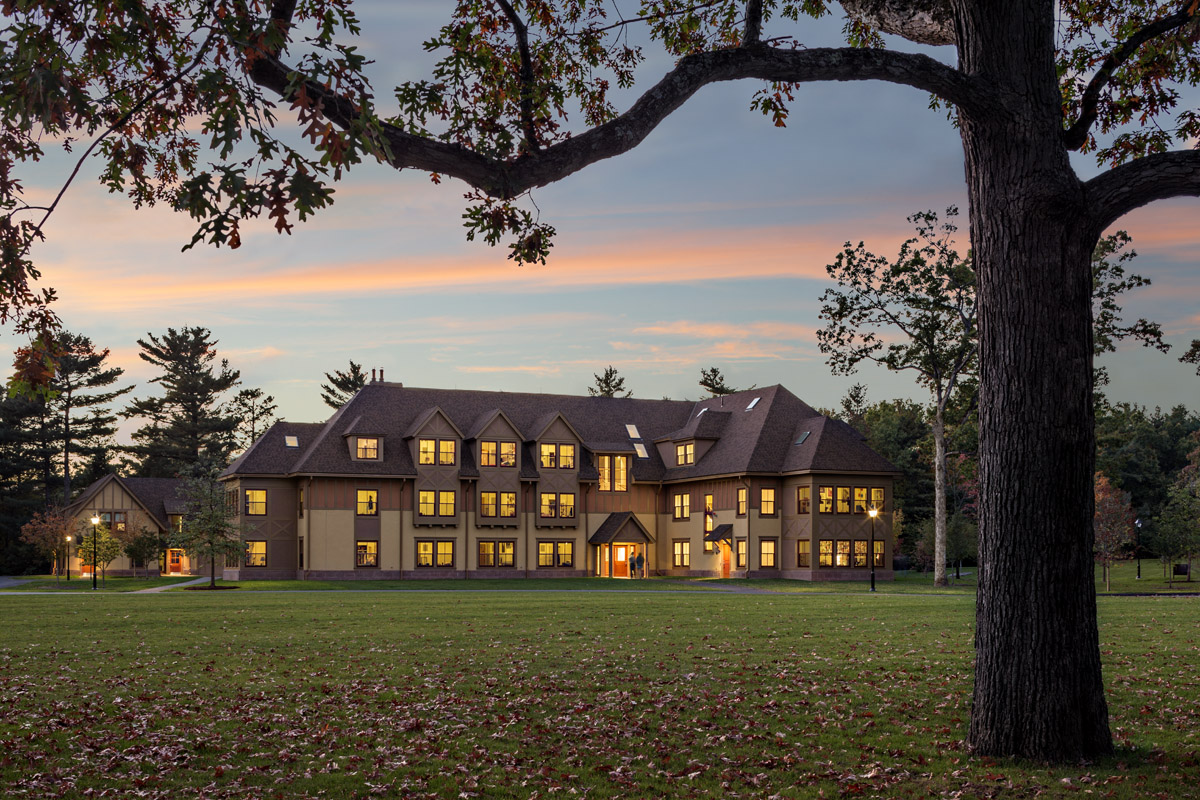
Gund House, on the campus of Westminster School, is a student and faculty residence.

Westminster School was founded in 1888 as a boys' school by William Lee Cushing, a graduate of Yale University.

Girls were first admitted to the school in 1971.

Like many boarding schools, Westminster faced difficult times in the 1970s as it competed for a shrinking pool of boarding students.

When Donald Werner retired in 1993, after serving as headmaster for 21 years, he was succeeded by Graham Cole.

Building projects include:

- Edge House. Designed by Westminster alumnus Graham Gund and built in 1996, Edge House houses 33 students and three faculty families.
- Kohn Squash Pavilion. Completed in spring 2000, the Squash Pavilion contains eight squash courts around a stepped viewing area with natural light from skylights. The team rooms, locker rooms, and other support spaces are located on a second floor mezzanine overlooking the viewing area and squash courts below.
- Sherwin Health & Athletic Center. Completed in 2003, the Sherwin Health & Athletic Center, the Hibbard Aquatic Center and the Health & Counseling Center is a multipurpose building. The Aquatic Center contains an eight lane competition pool with support facilities and a viewing area on the mezzanine floor.
- Armour Academic Center. This 85,000-square-foot Center houses the Humanities, Math and Science departments, library, and administration. Building features include a central atrium, two-story library, classrooms and laboratories, 120-seat lecture hall, planetarium, faculty and administrative offices, and a variety of lounge spaces.

With Cole's retirement in 2010, Westminster appointed William V.N. Philip as its eighth headmaster. Elaine B. White was appointed the ninth head of school in 2021.

== Faculty and staff ==
=== Headmasters ===
- 1888–1920: William Lee Cushing
- 1920–1922: Lemuel Gardner Pette
- 1922–1936: Raymond McOrmond
- 1936–1956: Arthur Milliken
- 1956–1970: Francis Keyes
- 1970–1993: Donald H. Werner
- 1993–2010: W. Graham Cole Jr.
- 2010–2021: William V.N. Philip
- 2021–present: Elaine B. White

== Theater ==
Each year the theater program stages three productions in the Werner Centennial Theater: one dramatic production, a musical production, and a student-directed performance.

Situated at the northeastern corner of the campus's central quadrangle, Centennial Center was upgraded in 1988 into a 30,000 square-foot building including a two-story lobby, a 400-seat, multi-use Shakespearean-style theater, music and dance studios and rehearsal room, dressing rooms, a scene shop/laboratory and other production support spaces.

== Notable alumni ==
- William Acquavella, art dealer, head of Acquavella Galleries
- William S. Beinecke, '32, namesake of Yale University's Beinecke Rare Book & Manuscript Library
- Lake Bell '97, actress
- Eric Boguniecki, NHL hockey player
- Ethan Brooks '91, NFL football player
- Joy Bryant '92, actress
- Tommy Cross '08, NHL hockey player
- David Doubilet '65, National Geographic photographer
- Patrick Ellis, radio personality
- Andrew Firestone '94, television personality on The Bachelor
- Peter Fonda, actor
- Bryan Nash Gill, '80, artist
- Graham Gund '59, architect
- Clarence Leonard Hay, archaeologist
- Bertil Hille
- John William Kilbreth, 1894, U.S. Army brigadier general
- Alec Musser, actor
- Ben Smith '06, NHL hockey player
- Edward Townsend Howes, architect and artist
- John V. Tunney '52, former United States senator and representative from the state of California
- Wellesley Wild '90, writer and executive producer of Family Guy
