= Acquavella (surname) =

Acquavella is an Italian surname. Notable people with the surname include:

- Nicholas Acquavella (1898–1987), Italian-born American art dealer and gallerist
- William Acquavella (born 1937/38), American art dealer and gallerist
