= Blake Geoffrion =

American ice hockey player

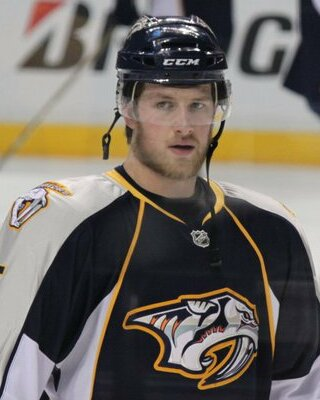
- Geoffrion with the Nashville Predators in 2011
- Born: February 3, 1988 (age 38) Plantation, Florida, U.S.
- Height: 6 ft 2 in (188 cm)
- Weight: 188 lb (85 kg; 13 st 6 lb)
- Position: Center
- Shot: Left
- Played for: Nashville Predators; Montreal Canadiens
- NHL draft: 56th overall, 2006; Nashville Predators
- Playing career: 2010–2013

Blake Daniel Geoffrion (born February 3, 1988) is an American former professional ice hockey player. He played in the National Hockey League (NHL) with the Nashville Predators and Montreal Canadiens between 2011 and 2012. He was selected in the second round, 56th overall, by the Predators in the 2006 NHL entry draft and made his NHL debut on February 26, 2011. In doing so, he became the first fourth-generation player in the league's history, after his father Dan, grandfather Bernie and great-grandfather Howie Morenz. He was traded to the Canadiens in 2012 and, while playing with their American Hockey League (AHL) affiliate, the Hamilton Bulldogs, suffered a depressed skull fracture that forced his retirement from the game in 2013. He then joined the Columbus Blue Jackets initially as a pro scout, before earning a promotion as the assistant general manager to AHL affiliate, the Lake Erie Monsters.

A graduate of the USA Hockey National Team Development Program (USNTDP), Geoffrion represented Team USA on three occasions. He was a member of the gold medal winning team at the 2006 IIHF World U18 Championship and won bronze at the 2007 World Junior Hockey Championship. He then moved on to the University of Wisconsin-Madison where he enjoyed a standout collegiate career. He was a conference all-star in his senior year of 2009–10, was also named the consensus All-American and Player of the Year and won the Hobey Baker Award as the top college player in the United States.

== Early life ==
Geoffrion was born in Plantation, Florida, but grew up in Brentwood, Tennessee. As a youth, he played in the 2002 Quebec International Pee-Wee Hockey Tournament with a minor ice hockey team from Cleveland.

He first attended the Culver Military Academy where he helped his team win the Indiana state championship in 2003. He was invited to join the USA Hockey National Team Development Program (USNTDP) where he spent two seasons between 2004 and 2006. He made his international debut with Team USA at the 2006 IIHF World Under-18 Championship. He scored five points in six games in the tournament for the gold medal winning Americans.

== Playing career ==
=== College ===
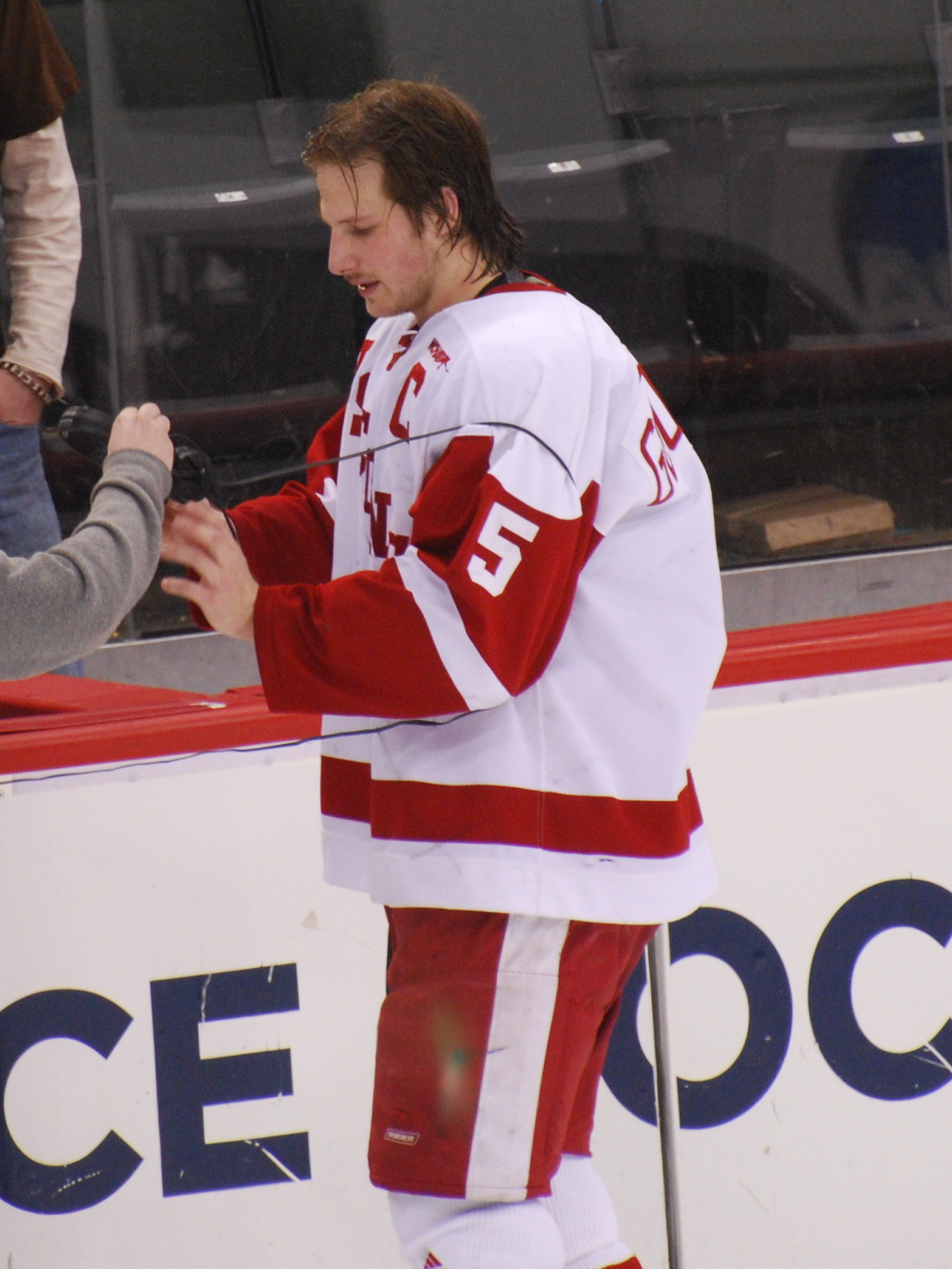
Geoffrion playing for the Wisconsin Badgers in the 2010 NCAA Division I Men's Ice Hockey Tournament

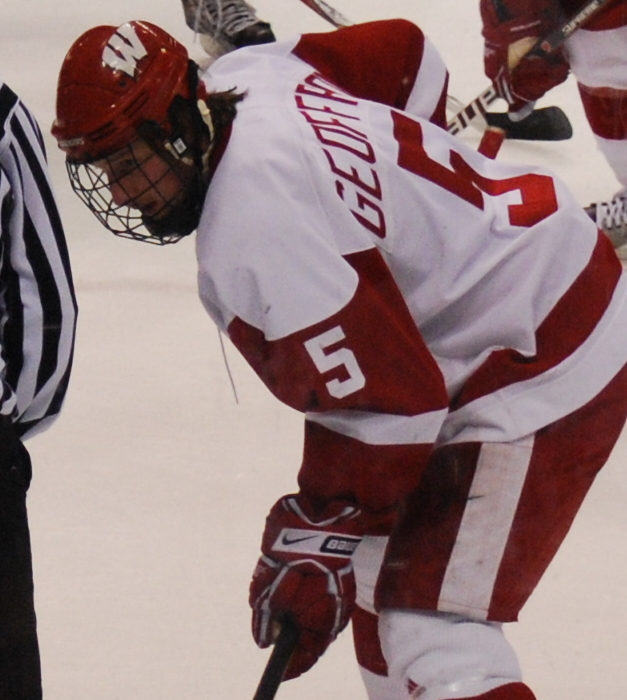
Geoffrion playing for the Wisconsin Badgers in the 2010 NCAA Division I Men's Ice Hockey West Regional Final

From the USNTDP, Geoffrion was recruited to play with the University of Wisconsin-Madison Badgers.

Geoffrion joined the Badgers in 2006–07 where he led the team in penalties with 62 minutes. He again played for Team USA, this time at the 2007 World Junior Ice Hockey Championships where he appeared in all seven of his team's games, registering one assist as the Americans won a bronze medal. In his sophomore season, Geoffrion improved to 30 points overall and tied for the team lead with 19 points in Western Collegiate Hockey Association (WCHA) play. His teammates named him the most competitive player on the Badgers. He returned to the World Junior Hockey Championships in 2008, scoring one point in six games while the Americans failed to win a medal.

Named co-captain of the Badgers in his junior season of 2008–09, Geoffrion led his team in goals within the WCHA with 12 and tied for the lead overall at 15. His overall total of 28 points was fourth best on the team. Serving as a tri-captain, he led the WCHA in goal scoring in 2009-10 with 19 and was second in the National Collegiate Athletic Association (NCAA) with 28. He reached the 50-goal plateau for his college career on March 13 and 100 points on February 19. Considered one of the NCAA's most complete players, Geoffrion was his team's top faceoff performer and was praised for the way his play improved as his team's games grew in importance.

He was named a first-team all-star in both the WCHA and the NCAA-West. Additionally, Geoffrion was named US College Hockey Online's national player of the year. Soon after the Badgers reached the 2010 NCAA championship game, Geoffrion was named the winner of the Hobey Baker Award as the top player in American college hockey. In doing so, he became the first Wisconsin player to win the award. Geoffrion and the Badgers were unable to cap off their season with a championship, however, losing 5–0 to the Boston College Eagles before a world indoor record crowd of 37,592 at Ford Field in Detroit.

=== Professional ===
Following his sophomore season with the Badgers, the Nashville Predators made Geoffrion their second round selection, 56th overall, at the 2006 NHL entry draft. He chose to complete his college career before turning to the professional game and signed an amateur try-out contract with the Predators' American Hockey League (AHL) affiliate, the Milwaukee Admirals, to conclude the 2009–10. He appeared in three playoff games with the Admirals and scored two goals.

The Predators signed Geoffrion to a two-year entry-level contract on June 15, 2010. He was assigned back to Milwaukee to begin the 2010–11 AHL season where he struggled to begin the season before injuries and the promotion of other players to Nashville opened up more ice time for him. After scoring 16 points in his first 31 games of the season, Geoffrion improved to 17 points in seven games at the end of January and beginning of February. His scoring outburst made him the first player to earn consecutive AHL player of the week since Jim Carey in 1994.

As a result of his improved play Geoffrion was recalled to Nashville on February 25, 2011. After Jared Ross, he became the second player raised in the American South to participate in an NHL game. One night later, he made his National Hockey League debut against the Dallas Stars. He scored his first NHL goal, in his third game, against Edmonton Oilers goaltender Martin Gerber on March 1. Geoffrion registered his first hat trick on March 20, 2011, against the Buffalo Sabres.

On February 17, 2012, Geoffrion was traded to the Montreal Canadiens with Robert Slaney and a 2012 second-round pick for defenseman Hal Gill and a conditional fifth-round draft pick in the 2013 NHL entry draft. To honor his grandfather and great-grandfather, Geoffrion chose to wear number 57 on his jersey (Bernie Geoffrion wore 5, Howie Morenz wore 7).

Geoffrion began the 2012–13 season with the AHL's Hamilton Bulldogs. During a November 9, 2012, game against the Syracuse Crunch, he suffered a depressed skull fracture following a hip check by Jean-Philippe Côté. As Geoffrion fell to the ice, his head struck the end of Côté's skate blade, causing the injury. He required emergency surgery to repair the fracture and was initially expected to make a full recovery. Four months after the injury, Geoffrion informed the Canadiens that he was contemplating retirement due to the injury, though he had not come to a final decision. He eventually decided to retire from professional hockey on July 15, 2013, at the age of 25.

== Post-playing career ==
In July 2013, the day following his retirement from active play, Geoffrion was hired by the Columbus Blue Jackets as a pro scout.

Following two seasons working in a scouting role with the Blue Jackets, Geoffrion transitioned into management, being named as the assistant general manager of Columbus' AHL affiliate, the Lake Erie Monsters, on July 19, 2016.

== Personal life ==
Upon making his debut with the Predators, Geoffrion became the NHL's first fourth generation player. His father, Dan, played three NHL seasons with the Montreal Canadiens and the original Winnipeg Jets. His great-grandfather (paternal grandmother's father) was Hockey Hall of Famer Howie Morenz, and the man named the best hockey player of the first half of the 20th century by the Canadian Press. His paternal grandfather, Bernie "Boom-Boom" Geoffrion, is also a Hall of Famer and the man who invented the slap shot (hence the nickname "Boom-Boom"). Geoffrion was close to his grandfather and was the last person "Boom Boom" spoke to before his death in 2006. Geoffrion wore #5 while with the Predators in his honor, while his teammates have nicknamed him "Boomer", after his grandfather.

Geoffrion's uncle by marriage, Hartland Monahan, was also an NHL player, while Hartland's son, Shane, was a Major League Baseball (MLB) player. He likewise has three brothers: Nick, Sebastien and Brice.

While attending Wisconsin, Geoffrion majored in consumer affairs and is presently associated with a marketing firm in Madison. He continues to learn about marketing and public relations, and writes a weekly blog for Nashville newspaper The Tennessean.

Geoffrion got engaged to his girlfriend Katelyn Deady in June 2012.

== Career statistics ==
=== Regular season and playoffs ===
| | | | Regular season | | | | | Playoffs |
| Season | Team | League | GP | G | A | Pts | PIM | GP | G | A | Pts | PIM |
|---|---|---|---|---|---|---|---|---|---|---|---|---|
| 2003–04 | Culver Military Academy | HS Prep | 45 | 12 | 28 | 40 | 62 | — | — | — | — | — |
| 2004–05 | U.S. NTDP U17 | USDP | 11 | 2 | 3 | 5 | 24 | — | — | — | — | — |
| 2004–05 | U.S. NTDP U18 | NAHL | 37 | 7 | 15 | 22 | 62 | 10 | 2 | 5 | 7 | 23 |
| 2005–06 | U.S. NTDP U18 | USDP | 41 | 12 | 14 | 26 | 38 | — | — | — | — | — |
| 2005–06 | U.S. NTDP U18 | NAHL | 13 | 6 | 9 | 15 | 30 | — | — | — | — | — |
| 2006–07 | University of Wisconsin | WCHA | 36 | 2 | 4 | 6 | 62 | — | — | — | — | — |
| 2007–08 | University of Wisconsin | WCHA | 36 | 10 | 20 | 30 | 52 | — | — | — | — | — |
| 2008–09 | University of Wisconsin | WCHA | 35 | 15 | 13 | 28 | 73 | — | — | — | — | — |
| 2009–10 | University of Wisconsin | WCHA | 40 | 28 | 22 | 50 | 56 | — | — | — | — | — |
| 2009–10 | Milwaukee Admirals | AHL | — | — | — | — | — | 3 | 2 | 0 | 2 | 0 |
| 2010–11 | Milwaukee Admirals | AHL | 45 | 11 | 26 | 37 | 38 | 1 | 0 | 2 | 2 | 2 |
| 2010–11 | Nashville Predators | NHL | 20 | 6 | 2 | 8 | 7 | 12 | 0 | 2 | 2 | 4 |
| 2011–12 | Nashville Predators | NHL | 22 | 0 | 3 | 3 | 17 | — | — | — | — | — |
| 2011–12 | Milwaukee Admirals | AHL | 20 | 2 | 7 | 9 | 8 | — | — | — | — | — |
| 2011–12 | Hamilton Bulldogs | AHL | 9 | 4 | 8 | 12 | 4 | — | — | — | — | — |
| 2011–12 | Montreal Canadiens | NHL | 13 | 2 | 0 | 2 | 10 | — | — | — | — | — |
| 2012–13 | Hamilton Bulldogs | AHL | 10 | 4 | 2 | 6 | 9 | — | — | — | — | — |
| AHL totals | | | 84 | 21 | 43 | 64 | 59 | 4 | 2 | 2 | 4 | 2 |
| NHL totals | | | 55 | 8 | 5 | 13 | 34 | 12 | 0 | 2 | 2 | 4 |

=== International ===
Medal record

Representing United States

Ice hockey

World Junior Championships
| Bronze medal – third place | 2007 Mora | |

IIHF U18 Championships
| Gold medal – first place | 2006 Halmstad | |

| Year | Team | Event | Result | GP | G | A | Pts | PIM |
|---|---|---|---|---|---|---|---|---|
| 2005 | United States | U17 | 5th | 5 | 2 | 3 | 5 | 2 |
| 2006 | United States | WJC18 | 1st place, gold medalist(s) | 6 | 1 | 4 | 5 | 8 |
| 2007 | United States | WJC | 3rd place, bronze medalist(s) | 7 | 0 | 1 | 1 | 6 |
| 2008 | United States | WJC | 4th | 6 | 0 | 1 | 1 | 8 |
| Junior totals | | | | 24 | 3 | 9 | 12 | 24 |

== Awards and honors ==
| Award | Year |
|---|---|
College
| All-WCHA First Team | 2009–10 |
| AHCA West First-Team All-American | 2009–10 |
| West First Team All-American | 2009–10 |
| Hobey Baker Memorial Award | 2009–10 |

== See also ==
- List of family relations in the NHL

Awards and achievements
| Preceded by Matt Gilroy | Winner of the Hobey Baker Award; 2009–10 | Succeeded by Andy Miele |
