= Jean-Philippe Côté =

Canadian ice hockey player

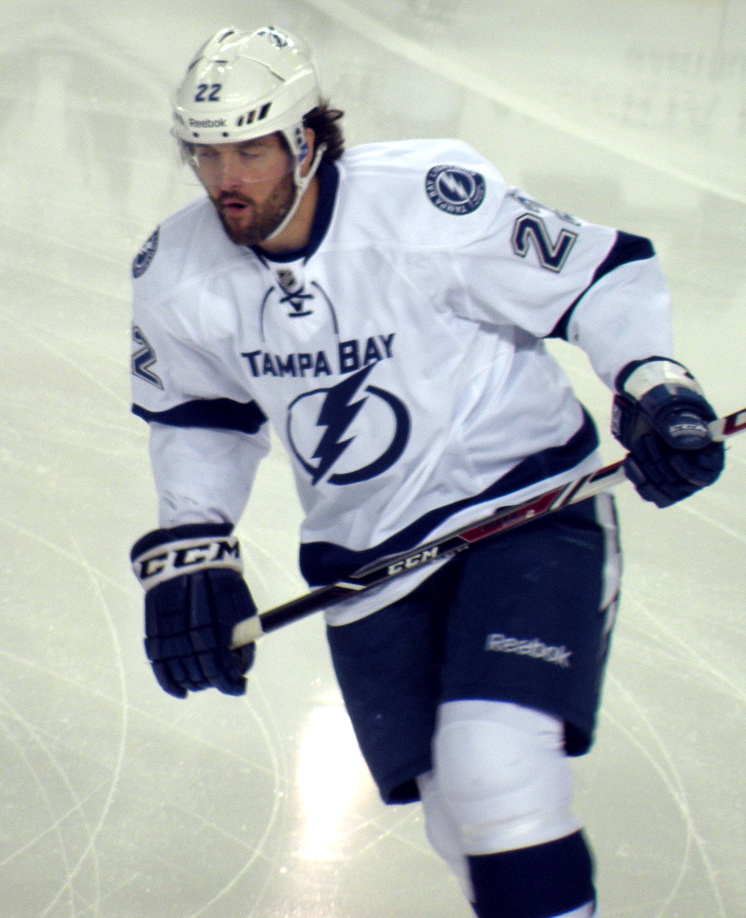
- Côté with the Tampa Bay Lightning in 2014
- Born: April 22, 1982 (age 44) Charlesbourg, Quebec, Canada
- Height: 6 ft 2 in (188 cm)
- Weight: 216 lb (98 kg; 15 st 6 lb)
- Position: Defence
- Shot: Left
- Played for: Montreal Canadiens; Kassel Huskies; Hamburg Freezers; Tampa Bay Lightning; Iserlohn Roosters; Boxers de Bordeaux; Brûleurs de Loups
- NHL draft: 265th overall, 2000; Toronto Maple Leafs
- Playing career: 2003–2018

Jean-Phillipe Marc Joseph Côté (born April 22, 1982) is a Canadian former professional ice hockey defenceman. He appeared in 27 games in the National Hockey League (NHL) with the Montreal Canadiens and Tampa Bay Lightning during the 2005–06 and 2013–14 seasons. The rest of his career, which lasted from 2003 to 2018, was mainly spent in the minor leagues. He is the son of former NHL player Alain Côté.

== Playing career ==
As a youth, Côté played in the 1995 and 1996 Quebec International Pee-Wee Hockey Tournaments with minor ice hockey teams from Quebec City.

Côté was drafted by the Toronto Maple Leafs 265th overall in the 2000 NHL entry draft, from the Cape Breton Screaming Eagles of the Quebec Major Junior Hockey League.

Unsigned from the Maple Leafs, Côté was signed to an AHL contract with the Hamilton Bulldogs for his first professional season in 2003–04. Côté eventually signed a contract in the coming season with NHL affiliate, the Montreal Canadiens.

During the 2005–06 season, he played his first game in the NHL on November 29, 2005, against the Ottawa Senators to fill in for the suspended Andrei Markov. He finished the night with 13 minutes of ice time, one penalty, and a -1. Later in the season, with another injury to Andrei Markov, Côté was recalled from the Bulldogs and played a regular shift. He often played with fellow 24-year-old blueliner Mike Komisarek, and the pair formed a solid and hard-working duo of defensive defencemen. After 8 games he was reassigned to the AHL with the return of Markov.

Côté proceeded to play the next couple of seasons entirely with the Canadiens' affiliate in the Bulldogs, culminating in winning the Calder Cup in 2007.

Until the 2008–09 season, Côté was given a try-out contract to participate in the Colorado Avalanche training camp. Following his release from the Avalanche on September 24, 2008, Côté was signed to a try-out with the Wilkes-Barre/Scranton Penguins on October 8, 2008, where he remained for the duration of the year.

A free agent to begin the 2009–10 season, Côté left North America and belatedly signed a one-year contract with the Kassel Huskies of the DEL on November 6, 2009. Posting 13 points in 38 games in the final season of the Huskies, Côté then signed with fellow DEL team, the Hamburg Freezers for the 2010–11 season on March 22, 2010.

Côté returned to North America for the 2011–12 season, initially signing with the Ontario Reign of the third-tier ECHL. On November 18, 2011, after 10 games with the Reign, Côté was loaned to make his return in the AHL with the Norfolk Admirals. After solidifying a position within the Admirals' defence, Côté was signed to an AHL contract for the remainder of the season on December 14, 2011. Côté contributed with 15 points in 58 games with the record-setting Admirals and played in every post-season game to help Norfolk capture their first Calder Cup, and collect his second.

With the affiliation between the Admirals and the Tampa Bay Lightning ceased, Côté followed the championship team and signed with new AHL affiliate, the Syracuse Crunch for the 2012–13 season on June 20, 2012.

During a game between the Hamilton Bulldogs and Syracuse Crunch, Côté body checked Blake Geoffrion, causing him to fracture his skull and end his hockey career.

After four seasons within the Tampa Bay Lightning's affiliate's, Côté returned to Germany as a free agent to sign a one-year contract with the Iserlohn Roosters of the DEL on July 17, 2015. At the conclusion of the 2015–16 season, Côté left as a free agent opting to sign as a free agent with French club, Boxers de Bordeaux of the Ligue Magnus on August 24, 2016.

Upon completing his second season in the Lique Magnus in 2017–18, Cote ended his 15-year professional career in accepting a pro scouting position with the San Jose Sharks on July 31, 2018.

== Career statistics ==
=== Regular season and playoffs ===
			Regular season					Playoffs
Season	Team	League	GP	G	A	Pts	PIM	GP	G	A	Pts	PIM
1998–99	Sainte–Foy Gouverneurs	QMAAA	38	10	24	34	34	17	1	8	9	17
1998–99	Québec Remparts	QMJHL	8	0	0	0	2	—	—	—	—	—
1999–00	Québec Remparts	QMJHL	34	0	10	10	15	—	—	—	—	—
1999–00	Cape Breton Screaming Eagles	QMJHL	28	0	4	4	21	4	0	1	1	4
2000–01	Cape Breton Screaming Eagles	QMJHL	71	6	29	35	90	12	0	0	0	18
2001–02	Cape Breton Screaming Eagles	QMJHL	61	4	20	24	72	16	1	6	7	38
2002–03	Cape Breton Screaming Eagles	QMJHL	16	1	3	4	12	—	—	—	—	—
2002–03	Acadie–Bathurst Titan	QMJHL	48	8	18	26	87	11	2	3	5	20
2003–04	Hamilton Bulldogs	AHL	75	2	7	9	79	10	0	4	4	24
2004–05	Hamilton Bulldogs	AHL	51	1	8	9	58	4	0	1	1	0
2005–06	Montreal Canadiens	NHL	8	0	0	0	4	—	—	—	—	—
2005–06	Hamilton Bulldogs	AHL	61	3	8	11	113	—	—	—	—	—
2006–07	Hamilton Bulldogs	AHL	68	3	9	12	115	6	0	0	0	2
2007–08	Hamilton Bulldogs	AHL	79	1	12	13	112	—	—	—	—	—
2008–09	Wilkes–Barre/Scranton Penguins	AHL	50	2	10	12	74	2	0	0	0	2
2009–10	Kassel Huskies	DEL	38	6	7	13	119	—	—	—	—	—
2010–11	Hamburg Freezers	DEL	39	3	1	4	70	—	—	—	—	—
2011–12	Ontario Reign	ECHL	10	1	2	3	9	—	—	—	—	—
2011–12	Norfolk Admirals	AHL	58	3	12	15	67	18	1	3	4	29
2012–13	Syracuse Crunch	AHL	74	3	14	17	143	18	1	5	6	29
2013–14	Tampa Bay Lightning	NHL	19	0	4	4	22	—	—	—	—	—
2013–14	Syracuse Crunch	AHL	33	2	11	13	57	—	—	—	—	—
2014–15	Syracuse Crunch	AHL	74	2	9	11	112	3	0	0	0	4
2015–16	Iserlohn Roosters	DEL	49	1	7	8	64	6	0	0	0	4
2016–17	Boxers de Bordeaux	FRA	43	2	13	15	93	11	0	3	3	4
2017–18	Brûleurs de Loups	FRA	19	3	3	6	106	17	1	3	4	18
AHL totals			623	22	100	122	930	61	2	13	15	90
NHL totals			27	0	4	4	26	—	—	—	—	—

=== International ===
Year	Team	Event	GP	G	A	Pts	PIM
1999	Canada	U18	3	0	0	0	0
Junior totals			3	0	0	0	0

== Awards and honors ==
Award	Year
AHL Calder Cup	2011–12
