= Damian Loeb =

American painter

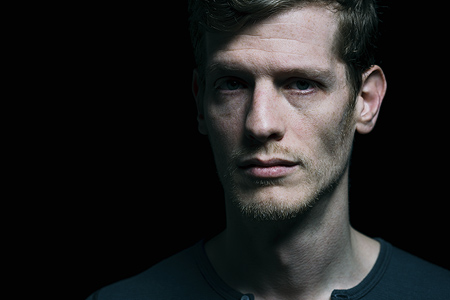
- Damian Loeb in 2011
- Born: May 9, 1970 (age 56); New Haven, Connecticut, United States
- Education: Self-taught
- Known for: Painting
- Spouse: Zoya Todorovic Loeb
- Website: damianloeb.com

Damian Loeb (/ˈloʊb/; born May 9, 1970) is an American artist best known for contemporary realist painting, though he has also exhibited digital collage and photographic prints. He has shown in New York at Mary Boone and Acquavella Galleries and internationally with White Cube in London and Jablonka Galerie, Cologne, among others. He is currently co-represented by Acquavella Galleries and Pace Gallery. Loeb has also exhibited at institutional art venues including the Kunsthalle in Hamburg and the Aldrich Contemporary Art Museum in Ridgefield, Connecticut.

== Education and early life ==
Growing up in Connecticut, Loeb worked for a short time at the Aldrich Museum in Ridgefield but is a self-taught painter. In 1989 Loeb moved to New York, where he lived for a time with the musician Moby and worked in a variety of creative fields including graphic design and video production, while honing his style in part by studying cinematic composition. In December 1996 the downtown nonprofit White Columns gave the painter a show as part of its “White Room” series for young unaffiliated artists. By the next year Loeb was represented by Jeffrey Deitch, whose recommendation led to placement of a painting on the cover of the magazine Flash Art in 1998. However, the gallerist never gave the artist a solo exhibition because of concerns about lawsuits stemming from Loeb’s use of appropriated imagery.

== Career ==
=== Early Shows: 1999 to 2006 ===
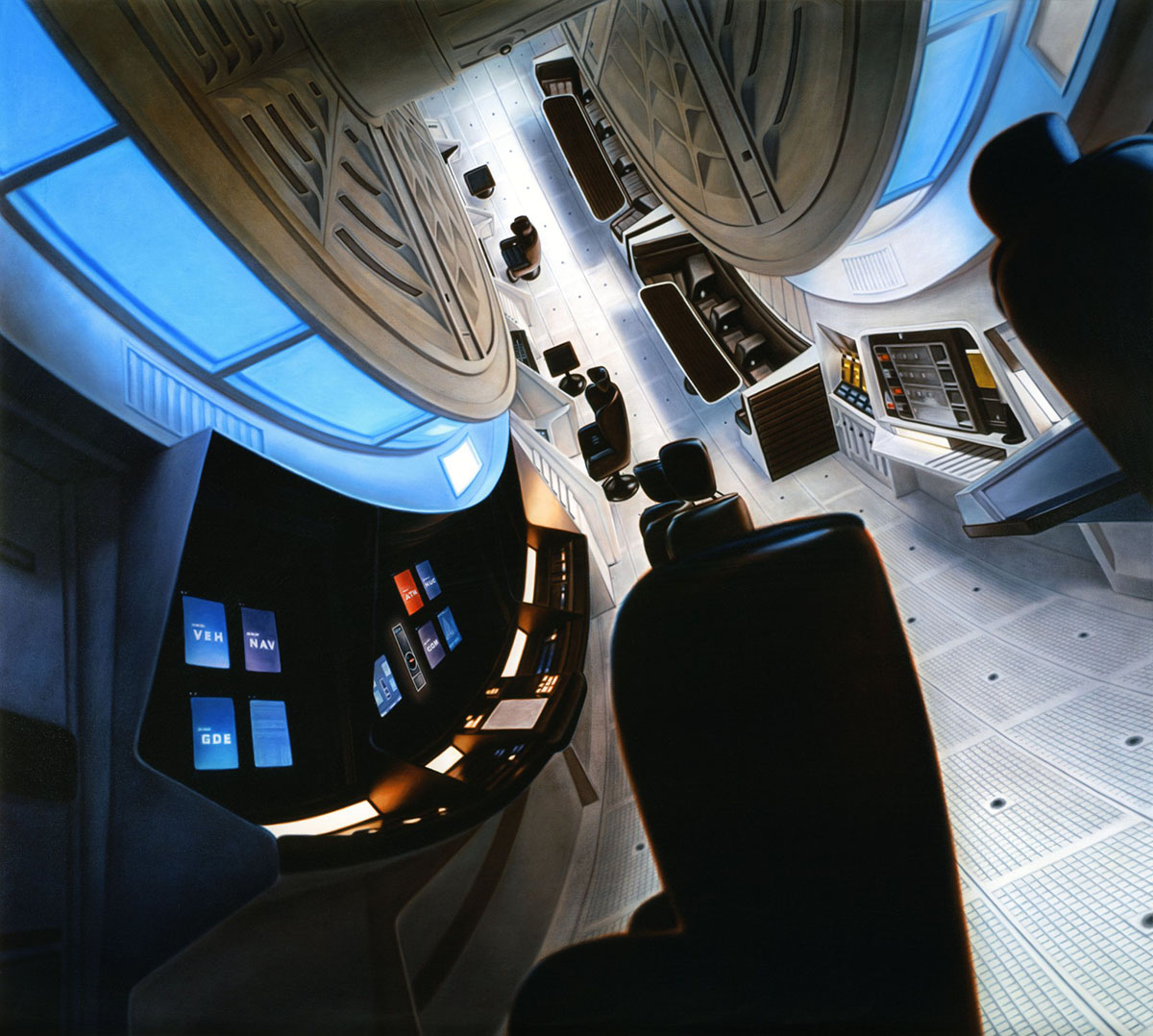
Damian Loeb, Good Afternoon Mr. Amer (2003), oil on linen, 108 x 120 in.

For his early shows with Mary Boone, Loeb made paintings by lifting and recombining individual elements from magazines, books and films. Of his 1999 exhibition with White Cube in London, one critic wrote: “Combining the precise Photo-Realism of Richard Estes with the mute angst of Edward Hopper, Loeb creates a sense of helplessness that is mesmerizing.” Loeb himself avoided the term photorealism, explaining his goal is to reproduce the feeling of a memory rather than the exact imagery of a photograph. “I use transparency and pigment to emphasize something photos can't.“ Despite the fact that many of his contemporary peers copied photographic works wholesale, charges of copyright infringement continued to dog Loeb through the late 1990s.

For his final show with Mary Boone in 2003, Loeb embarked on a series of paintings based on stills from classic horror and science fiction films. To create these works, he captured and digitally combined multiple stills which were then rendered as large oil paintings. Many of the works take the form of extreme landscapes up to 14 feet long, engulfing one's field of view and reproducing the atmospheric elements of the scene without the use of recognizable or iconic signifiers.

In 2006 the Aldrich Contemporary Art Museum mounted Loeb’s first retrospective as “part of three separate shows billed as ‘Homecoming’ acknowledging three artists—Loeb, Sarah Bostwick, and Doug Wada—who had grown up in or near Ridgefield.” The show was notable in part because it eschewed more provocative aspects of the work that typically drew headlines to focus on Loeb’s painstaking process by including collages and a wall with a grid of original photographs.

=== Mature Work: 2008 to Present ===
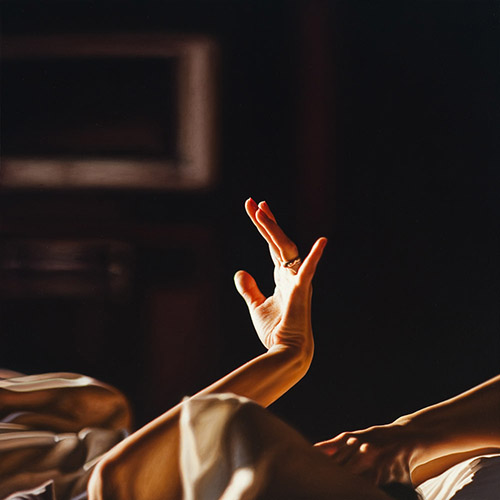
Damian Loeb, Atmosphere (2010), oil on linen, 36 x 36 in.

In 2008, five years after his last prevoous solo New York exhibition, Loeb’s first show with Acquavella Galleries featured the familiar large cinematic canvases as well as a group of small-scale landscapes, with both series now derived entirely from original photographs taken by Loeb. The New York Times complimented the artist for his “cinematographer's eye for suspenseful scenes,” while another critic wrote that show seemed to juxtapose the well-trod past with a path forward allowing Loeb “to become the 21st-century Turner.” For his 2011 show at the gallery, Loeb took another turn, drawing from his vast and growing archive of digital photographs as source material to present nine nudes of his wife so meticulously rendered that each canvas would take up to six months to complete.

Since 2011 Loeb has been focused on painting scenes of Earth and its celestial environs, all based on his own photographs, capturing a wide range of astronomical phenomena. In 2017 he traveled to Jackson Hole, Wyoming, to capture the total solar eclipse visible from North America, using a hydrogen alpha telescope with an attached camera to observe and record the two minute and twenty-two second phenomenon. The resulting works were exhibited by Acquavella in a solo exhibition at Frieze New York in May 2019. Despite the evident precision of the works, they continued to aim to capture a remembered feeling, a sense of awe. “Pushing the landscape genre into the realm of the extraterrestrial, Damian Loeb gives the nineteenth-century Romantic sublime a twenty-first-century reboot by depicting vistas that would have been inconceivable in earlier eras, such as view from airplanes and the Hubble telescope, Loeb’s glossy hyperrealist style has a distinct digital vibrancy, though his large-scale canvases call for an extended contemplation not commonly associated with digital images,” wrote art historian Robert Shane in Landscape Painting Now. “His most recent work marks a conceptual break with his earlier narrative scenes based on appropriated film stills, though his landscapes still retain a cinematic drama.”

Since 2021 Loeb has been co-represented by Pace Gallery and Acquavella Galleries, and his first exhibit with Pace was at their space in Palo Alto, California.

=== Selected solo exhibitions ===
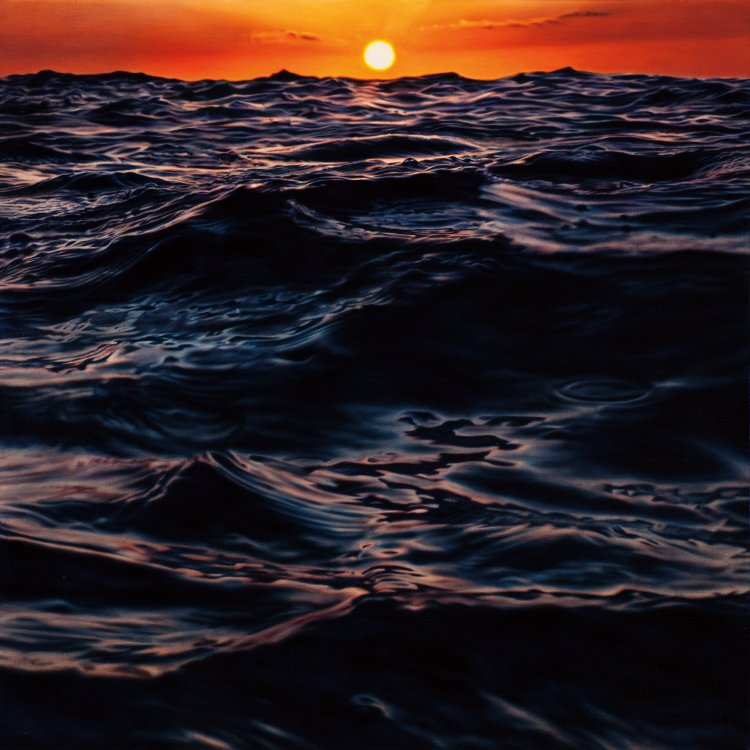
Damian Loeb, Rayleigh Scattering (2013), oil on linen, 36 x 36 in.

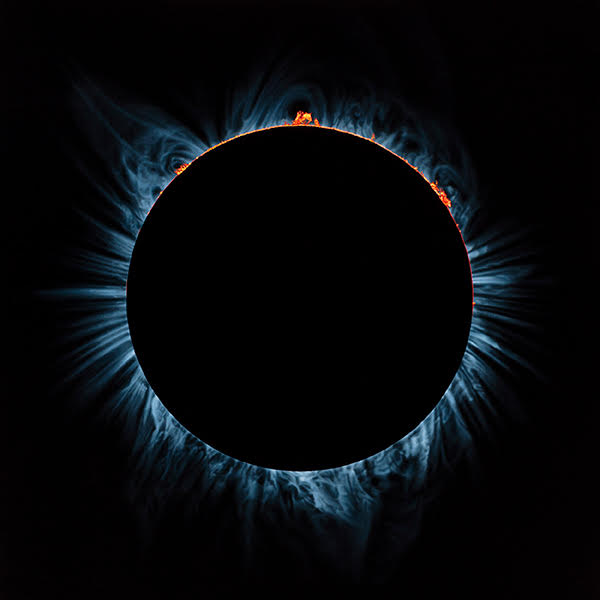
Damian Loeb, The Architects of Law (Grand Mal) (2019), oil on linen, 72 x 72 in.

- 1999: Damian Loeb, January 7 – February 13, Mary Boone Gallery, New York
- 1999: Mangoes, October 29 – November 20, White Cube, London
- 2000: I Can Stop Anytime, January 7 – February 12, Mary Boone Gallery, New York
- 2001: Public Domain, March 31 – May 6, Mary Boone Gallery, New York
- 2003: Horror/Sci-Fi, May 1 – June 31, Mary Boone Gallery, New York
- 2004: Metropolitan, April 2 – May 5, Mario Diacono Gallery, Boston
- 2005: Deliverance, October 7 – November 2, Mario Diacono Gallery, Boston
- 2006: New Paintings, February 3 – March 18, Jablonka Gallery, Cologne, Germany
- 2006: Homecoming, March 26 – August 6, Aldrich Contemporary Art Museum, Ridgefield, Connecticut
- 2008: Synesthesia, Parataxic Distortion, and the Shadow, September 3 – October 6, Acquavella Galleries, New York
- 2011: Verschränkung and The Uncertainty Principle, May 5 – June 16, Acquavella Galleries, New York
- 2014: Sol d, February 28 – April 10, Acquavella Galleries, New York
- 2017: Sgr A*, March 3 – April 4, Acquavella Galleries, New York
- 2019: All Hope is Lost, May 2 – 5, Acquavella Galleries at Frieze New York
- 2021: Wishful Thinking, May 19 - July 2, Pace Gallery, Palo Alto
- 2022: Still, October 1 - November 5, Taka Ishii Gallery, Tokyo, Japan

== Teaching ==
Through the 2010s Loeb worked repeatedly with the New York Academy of Art, serving as a visiting artist, participating in their mentorship program, and delivering lectures in 2016 and 2018. In the fall of 2019, Loeb delivered a lecture at Yale University as part of his residency with their Center for Collaborative Arts and Media, exploring the culture of surveillance, in an ongoing project titled My First Algorithm.

== Art market ==
Loeb’s auction record, set at Sotheby’s New York on May 10, 2012, is $182,500 for Vertigo, painted in 2006. More recently, Sooner Than You Think from 2012 was reportedly sold by Acquavella for $180,000 at the 2020 online edition of the Frieze New York art fair.
