= Ben Smith (ice hockey, born 1988) =

American ice hockey player (born 1988)

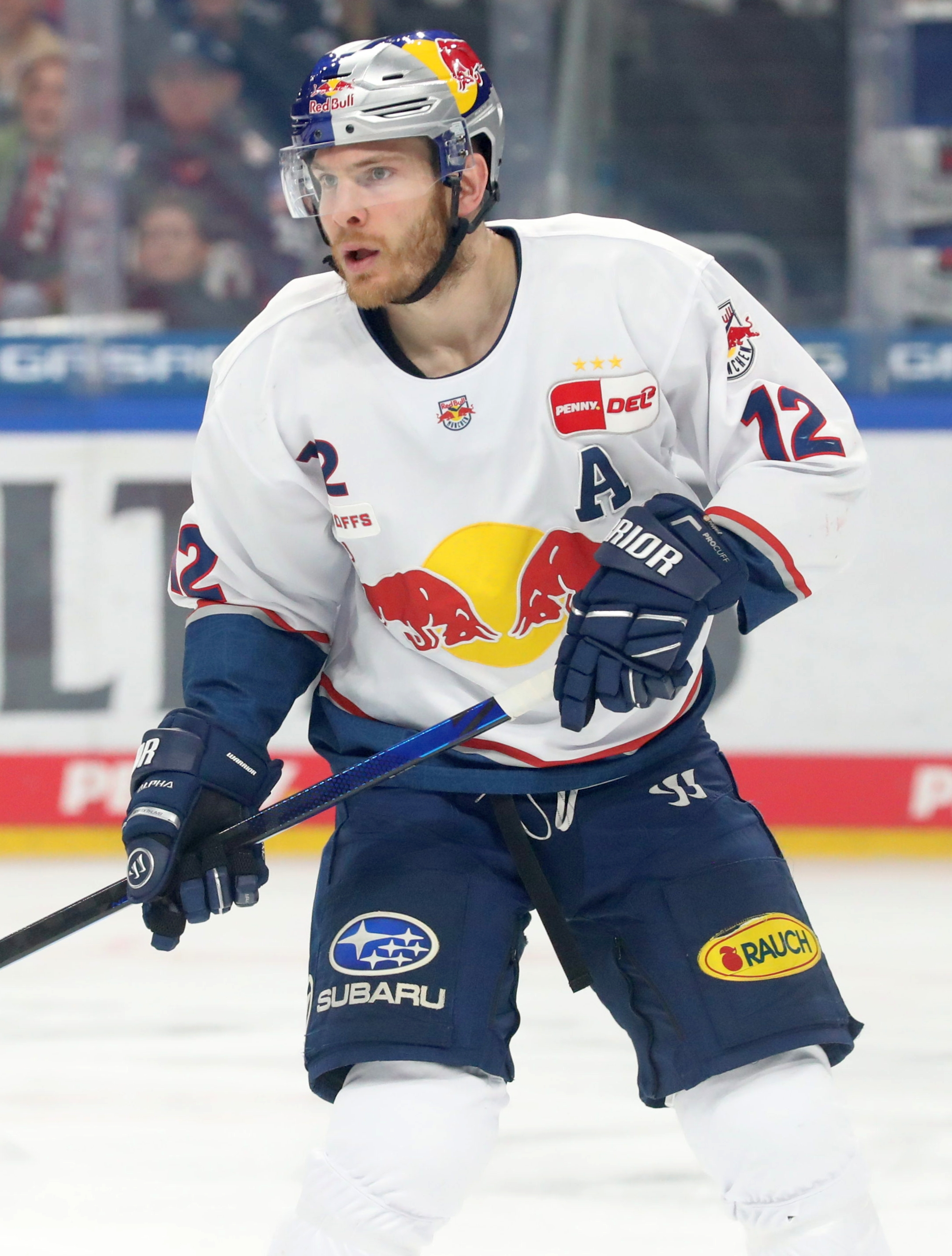
- Smith with the EHC München in May 2022
- Born: July 11, 1988 (age 38) Winston-Salem, North Carolina, U.S.
- Height: 5 ft 11 in (180 cm)
- Weight: 198 lb (90 kg; 14 st 2 lb)
- Position: Right wing
- Shot: Right
- Played for: Chicago Blackhawks; San Jose Sharks; Toronto Maple Leafs; Colorado Avalanche; Adler Mannheim; Rögle BK; EHC München
- National team: United States
- NHL draft: 169th overall, 2008; Chicago Blackhawks
- Playing career: 2010–2025

Benjamin Alexander Smith (born July 11, 1988) is an American former professional ice hockey forward. He played in the National Hockey League (NHL) for the Chicago Blackhawks, San Jose Sharks, Toronto Maple Leafs and the Colorado Avalanche. Additionally, Smith played in the Swedish Hockey League (SHL) with Rögle BK and in the Deutsche Eishockey Liga (DEL) for Adler Mannheim and EHC München.

Smith was a member of the Blackhawks 2013 Stanley Cup winning team.

== Playing career ==
As a youth, Smith played in the 2001 and 2002 Quebec International Pee-Wee Hockey Tournaments with the New York Rangers minor ice hockey team.

Smith graduated from Westminster School in 2006 and played four seasons at Boston College, helping the Eagles win two national championships. While playing for BC, Smith was drafted by the Chicago Blackhawks 169th overall in the sixth round of the 2008 NHL entry draft.

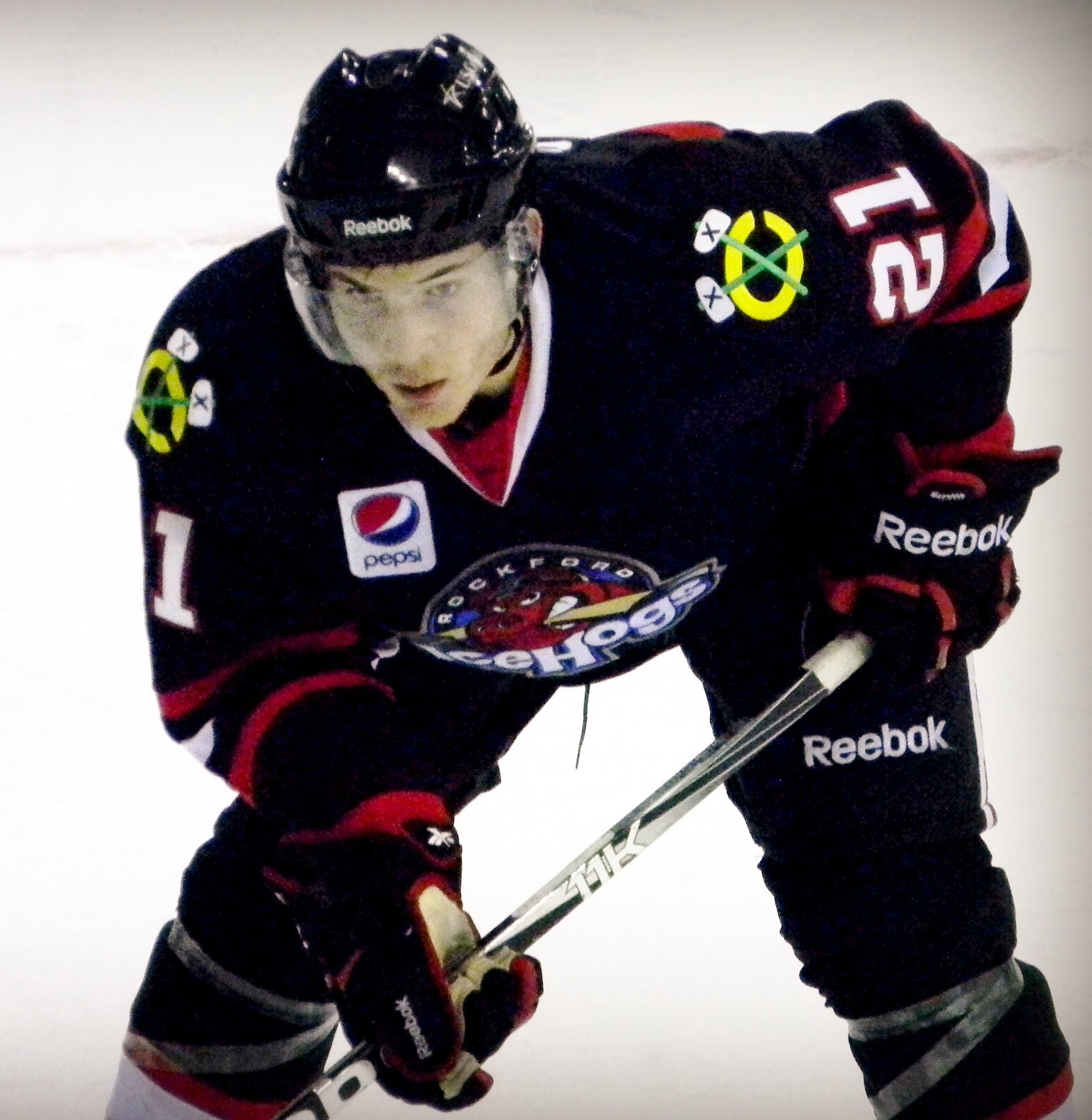
Smith playing with the Rockford IceHogs in January 2012

On October 29, 2010 the Blackhawks recalled Smith from the AHL's Rockford IceHogs to make his NHL debut in a home game against the Edmonton Oilers. He scored his first NHL goal on April 8, 2011 against Jimmy Howard of the Detroit Red Wings. On April 15, 2011, Smith scored 2 goals against the Vancouver Canucks in a 4–3 loss in only his second NHL playoff game. On April 24, 2011, during game six of the Western Conference quarterfinals, Smith scored the overtime goal on a rebound against the Vancouver Canucks' goaltender, Roberto Luongo, to force a game seven in Vancouver after the Canucks had previously been leading the series 3–0. The Blackhawks ended up losing game seven in overtime.

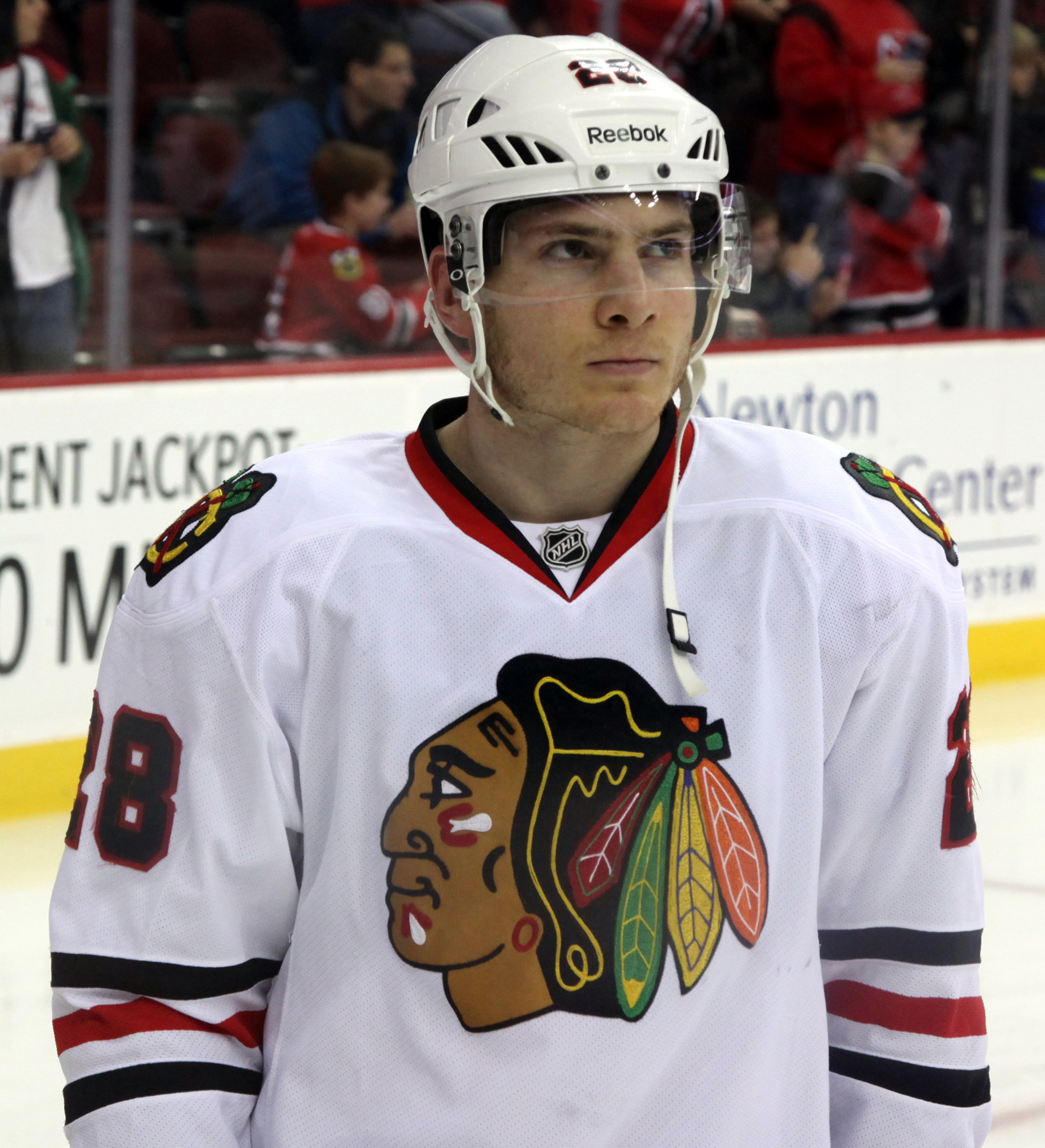
Smith with the Chicago Blackhawks in December 2014

On June 17, 2013, Smith was called up to play his first Stanley Cup Final game, a 2–0 loss to the Boston Bruins, to fill in over the injured Marián Hossa. The Blackhawks won the Cup on June 24, 2013, when they defeated the Bruins in Game six games.

On June 27, 2014, the Blackhawks signed him to a two-year contract extension. In the previous playoff run, Smith scored four goals in all 19 playoff games to help the Blackhawks advance to the Western Conference Final.

On March 2, 2015, Smith was traded by the Blackhawks to the San Jose Sharks in exchange for Andrew Desjardins. He scored his first goal with the Sharks the same day in their shutout game against the Montreal Canadiens, but remained for most of the season with the Sharks' AHL affiliate San Jose Barracuda.

On February 27, 2016, Smith, Alex Stalock and a conditional fourth-round pick in 2018 were traded by the Sharks to the Toronto Maple Leafs in exchange for James Reimer and Jeremy Morin.

Despite putting up acceptable numbers with the Maple Leafs, Smith was placed on waivers by the team on March 30, 2016. Smith cleared the following day and was assigned to the Toronto Marlies of the AHL. Despite being considered to be favourites to win the Calder Cup, the Marlies were eliminated in the third round of the playoffs, with Smith contributing nine points in their fifteen-game run.

On August 16, 2016, he signed a one-year, two-way deal with the Colorado Avalanche, worth $675,000 at the NHL level and $150,000 at the AHL level. Having made the Avalanche opening night roster, Smith made his debut with Colorado to start the 2016–17 season in a 6–5 victory over the Dallas Stars on October 15, 2016. Smith would play in four scoreless games for the Avalanche before being placed on waivers and being claimed by the Toronto Maple Leafs on October 24, 2016. Smith was claimed due to the depth he provided the team on the penalty kill, a position coach Mike Babcock praised him for during his stint the previous season in Toronto.

In the 2017–18 season, he won the Calder Cup with the Toronto Marlies, serving as team captain. On June 15, 2018, he signed with Adler Mannheim of the German DEL.

After a second stint with Adler Mannheim, Smith remained in the DEL, agreeing to a one-year contract with EHC München on May 10, 2021.

== Personal life ==
Smith was born in Winston-Salem, North Carolina, and raised in Avon, Connecticut. Smith is the first player born in the state of North Carolina to have his name engraved on the Stanley Cup.

Smith's younger brother played Division I soccer for William & Mary. His uncle is Canadian conductor Peter Oundjian.

== Career statistics ==
=== Regular season and playoffs ===
			Regular season					Playoffs
Season	Team	League	GP	G	A	Pts	PIM	GP	G	A	Pts	PIM
2004–05	Boston Jr. Bruins	EJHL	32	10	18	28	0	—	—	—	—	—
2005–06	Westminster School	HS-Prep	26	23	35	58	12	—	—	—	—	—
2005–06	Boston Little Bruins	18U AAA	26	14	24	38	6	—	—	—	—	—
2006–07	Boston College	HE	42	10	8	18	10	—	—	—	—	—
2007–08	Boston College	HE	44	25	25	50	12	—	—	—	—	—
2008–09	Boston College	HE	37	6	11	17	6	—	—	—	—	—
2009–10	Boston College	HE	42	16	21	37	8	—	—	—	—	—
2009–10	Rockford IceHogs	AHL	—	—	—	—	—	3	1	0	1	0
2010–11	Rockford IceHogs	AHL	63	19	12	31	16	—	—	—	—	—
2010–11	Chicago Blackhawks	NHL	6	1	0	1	0	7	3	0	3	0
2011–12	Chicago Blackhawks	NHL	13	2	0	2	0	—	—	—	—	—
2011–12	Rockford IceHogs	AHL	38	15	16	31	10	—	—	—	—	—
2012–13	Rockford IceHogs	AHL	54	27	20	47	13	—	—	—	—	—
2012–13	Chicago Blackhawks	NHL	1	1	0	1	0	1	0	0	0	0
2013–14	Chicago Blackhawks	NHL	75	14	12	26	2	19	4	2	6	2
2014–15	Chicago Blackhawks	NHL	61	5	4	9	2	—	—	—	—	—
2014–15	San Jose Sharks	NHL	19	2	3	5	0	—	—	—	—	—
2015–16	San Jose Sharks	NHL	6	0	0	0	0	—	—	—	—	—
2015–16	San Jose Barracuda	AHL	14	8	2	10	4	—	—	—	—	—
2015–16	Toronto Maple Leafs	NHL	16	2	4	6	0	—	—	—	—	—
2015–16	Toronto Marlies	AHL	5	4	2	6	0	15	2	7	9	2
2016–17	Colorado Avalanche	NHL	4	0	0	0	0	—	—	—	—	—
2016–17	Toronto Maple Leafs	NHL	36	2	2	4	4	—	—	—	—	—
2017–18	Toronto Marlies	AHL	73	27	32	59	10	20	7	9	16	0
2018–19	Adler Mannheim	DEL	52	11	24	35	6	14	7	7	14	2
2019–20	Adler Mannheim	DEL	52	20	25	45	4	—	—	—	—	—
2020–21	Rögle BK	SHL	10	1	3	4	6	—	—	—	—	—
2020–21	Adler Mannheim	DEL	33	12	15	27	6	6	2	4	6	0
2021–22	EHC München	DEL	44	16	16	32	14	11	5	4	9	6
2022–23	EHC München	DEL	43	17	18	35	4	18	5	7	12	6
2023–24	EHC München	DEL	39	5	16	21	8	5	0	1	1	2
2024–25	EHC München	DEL	12	3	3	6	4	—	—	—	—	—
NHL totals			237	29	25	54	8	27	7	2	9	2
DEL totals			275	84	117	201	46	54	19	23	42	16

Medal record

Representing United States

Men's ice hockey

World Championships
Bronze medal – third place	2015 Czech Republic	

=== International ===
Year	Team	Event	Result	GP	G	A	Pts	PIM
2005	United States	U18	5th	5	2	2	4	0
2015	United States	WC	3rd place, bronze medalist(s)	10	2	0	2	0
Senior totals				10	2	0	2	0

== Awards and honors ==
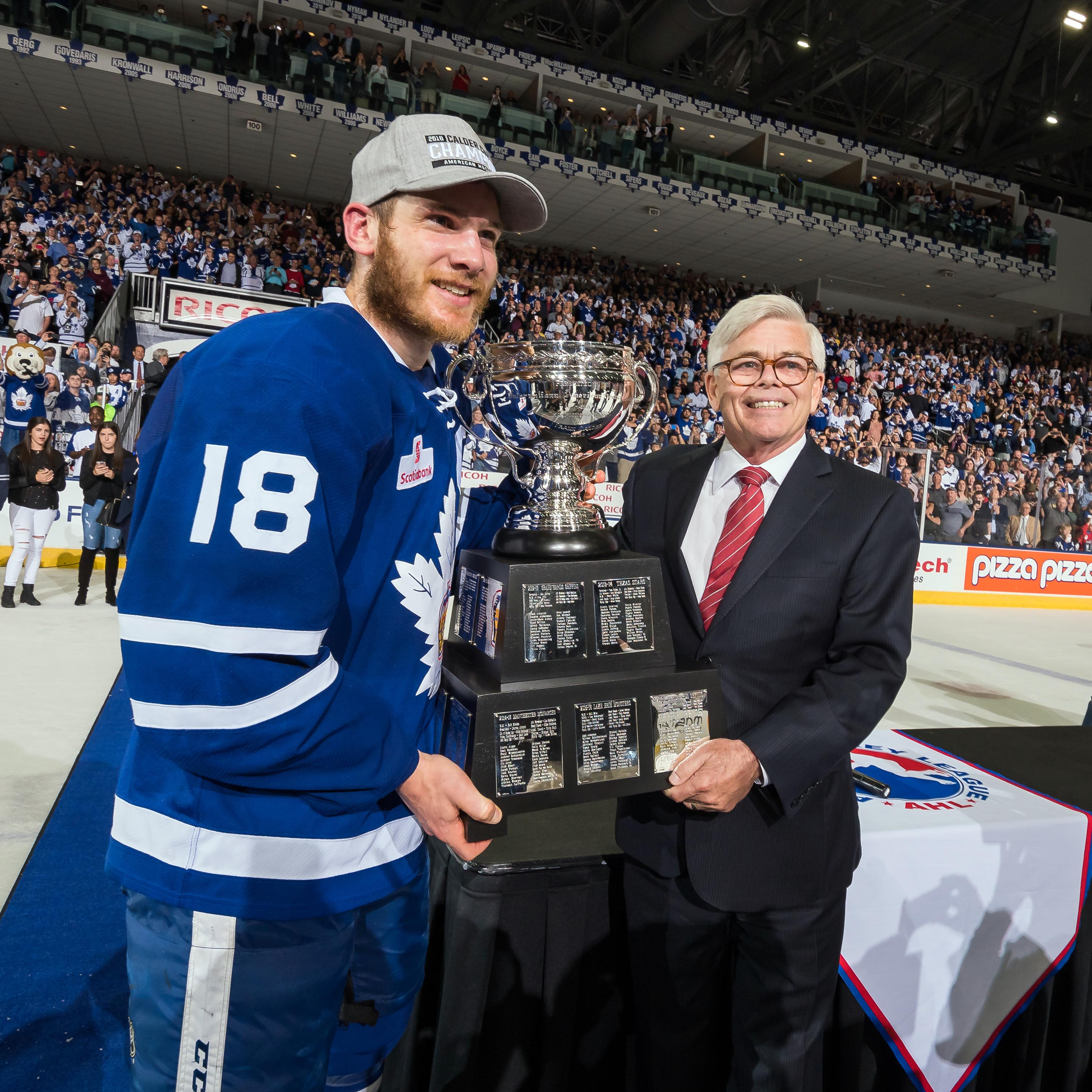
Smith receiving the Calder Cup as the captain of the Toronto Marlies

On May 2, 2017, Smith agreed to a one-year extension to remain with the Maple Leafs.

Award	Year
College
All-NCAA All-Tournament Team	2008, 2010
NCAA Men's Division I Championship (Boston College)	2008, 2010
AHL
Second All-Star Team	2018
Calder Cup champion	2018
NHL
Stanley Cup champion	2013
DEL
DEL champion	2019, 2023

Awards and achievements
Preceded by Dean Strong	Len Ceglarski Sportsmanship Award; 2009–10	Succeeded by Brian Flynn
Preceded by Colby Cohen	NCAA Tournament Most Outstanding Player; 2010	Succeeded by J. T. Brown
