= Jimmy Hayes (ice hockey) =

American ice hockey player (1989–2021)

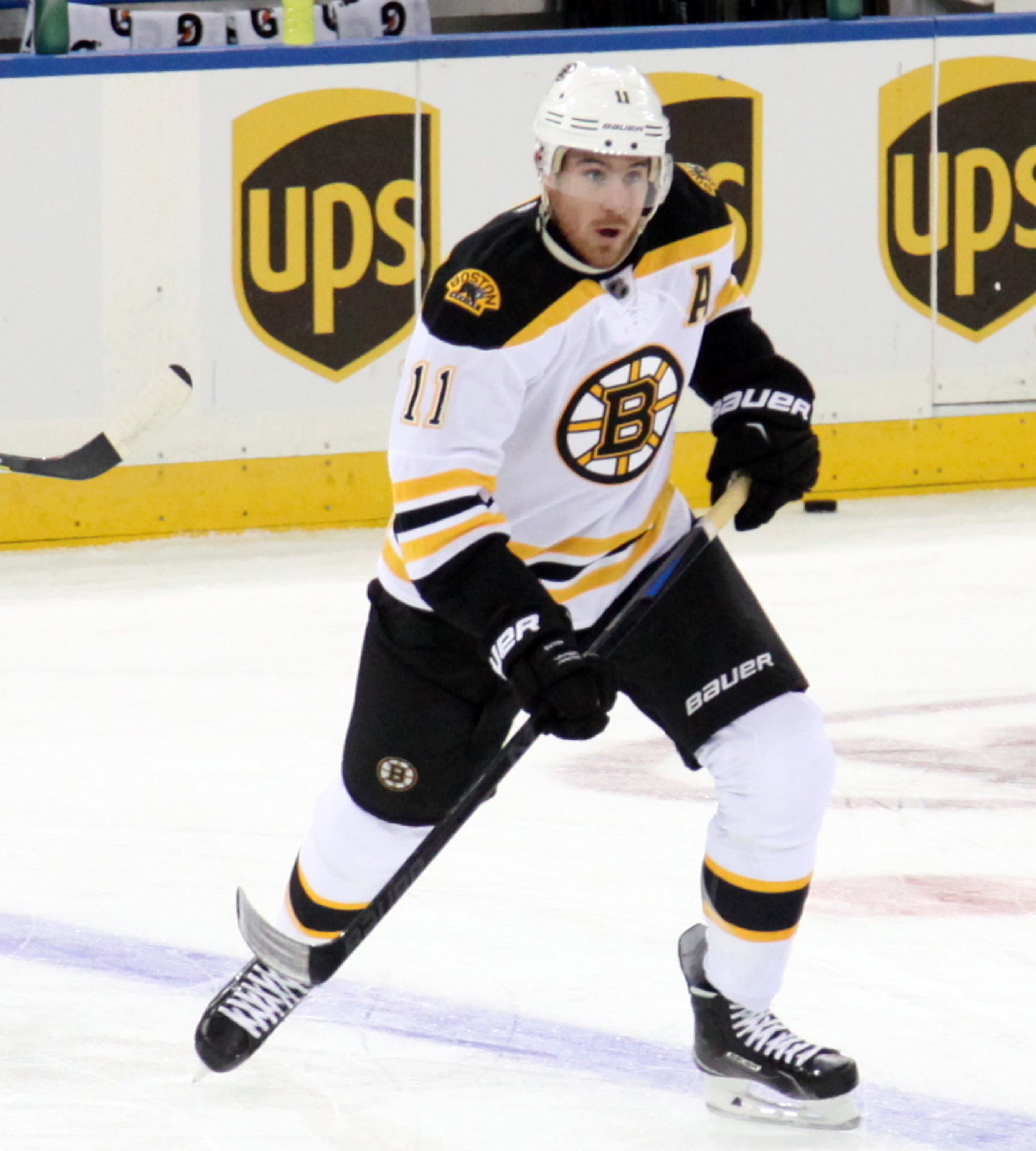
- Hayes with the Boston Bruins in September 2015
- Born: November 21, 1989 Boston, Massachusetts, U.S.
- Died: August 23, 2021 (aged 31) Milton, Massachusetts, U.S.
- Height: 6 ft 5 in (196 cm)
- Weight: 215 lb (98 kg; 15 st 5 lb)
- Position: Right wing
- Shot: Right
- Played for: Chicago Blackhawks; Florida Panthers; Boston Bruins; New Jersey Devils
- National team: United States
- NHL draft: 60th overall, 2008; Toronto Maple Leafs
- Playing career: 2011–2019

James Ryan Hayes (November 21, 1989 – August 23, 2021) was an American professional ice hockey right winger. Nicknamed "Broadway", he was selected by the Toronto Maple Leafs in the second round, 60th overall, of the 2008 NHL entry draft and played in the National Hockey League (NHL) with the Chicago Blackhawks, Florida Panthers, Boston Bruins, and the New Jersey Devils. His younger brother Kevin Hayes also played in the NHL.

== Playing career ==
=== Amateur ===
In 2005–06, Hayes was a member of the U.S. National U-17 Team at the 2005 Four Nations Tournament, hosted in Russia. He was then selected to the 2006 U.S. U-17 Select Team and participated at the U-18 Ivan Hlinka Memorial Tournament hosted in the Czech Republic. He was selected first overall in the 2006 USHL Futures Draft by the Ohio Junior Blue Jackets.

In 2006–07, Hayes played for the USA Hockey National Team Development Program (NTDP)'s under-18 team, and was also a member of the silver medal-winning Team USA at the 2007 IIHF World U18 Championships, hosted in Finland.

The 2007–08 season marked Hayes' second season with the NTDP. In 18 games with the U18 team, he tallied seven points, and in 19 games with the U.S. National Team, he tallied ten points. In February 2008, Hayes had his United States Hockey League (USHL) rights traded from the Ohio Jr. Blue Jackets to the Lincoln Stars. Shortly after, he was released from the NTDP and joined the Stars. He played with Lincoln for 21 games, scoring four goals and 11 assists, also registering nine post-season from eight games. In the Fall of 2008, Hayes signed a letter of intent to attend Boston College of the NCAA's Hockey East conference. He was selected by the Toronto Maple Leafs in the second round, 60th overall, of the 2008 NHL entry draft.

In his three-year, 117-game tenure with the Boston College Eagles, Hayes tallied a total of 81 points (42 goals and 39 assists). As a freshman in the 2008–09 season, Hayes played in 36 games and registered 13 points (eight goals and five assists). Of the eight goals, one was a game-winning goal, one was a power play goal, and one was a shorthanded goal. At the end of the season, Hayes ranked fifth on the team with 75 shots. He is also noted to have recorded two multiple-goal games, including one hat trick.

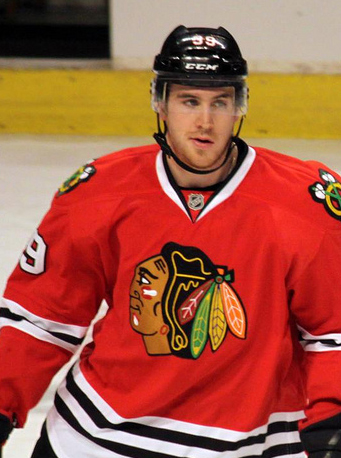
Hayes with the Blackhawks in January 2012. The 2011–12 season was his rookie season in the NHL

As a sophomore in the 2009–10 season, Hayes played in all 42 of Boston College's games. During that time, he registered 35 points (13 goals and 22 assists). He is also credited with three power play goals, three game-winning goals, and a +7 plus-minus rating. Hayes had nine multi-point games during the season, including one four-point outing and one three-point night. Hayes' effort during the post-season helped to lift the Eagles over the University of Maine in a 7–6 overtime victory during the Hockey East championship game on March 20. Hayes and the Eagles won the 2010 NCAA Division I Men's Ice Hockey Tournament in Detroit at Ford Field.

=== Professional ===
On June 26, 2010, the Toronto Maple Leafs traded Hayes to the Chicago Blackhawks in exchange for the 43rd overall selection in the 2010 NHL entry draft (Bradley Ross).

Hayes made his NHL debut against the Detroit Red Wings on December 30, 2011. He scored his first NHL goal on January 2, 2012, in his second career game, against Devan Dubnyk of the Edmonton Oilers. Hayes scored his second goal on January 5, in this third career game against Ilya Bryzgalov of the Philadelphia Flyers.

After playing 10 games for the Blackhawks lockout-shortened 2012–13 season and 67 games for the Rockford IceHogs in the AHL, Hayes was a part of the Blackhawks 2013 Stanley Cup-winning team and received a ring from the team but didn't qualify to get his name engraved on the Cup by not playing at least 23 games in the lockout-shortened 2012–13 regular season or any games in the Finals and the playoffs altogether.

During the 2013–14 season, on November 14, 2013, Hayes was traded, along with Dylan Olsen, to the Florida Panthers in exchange for Kris Versteeg and Philippe Lefebvre. On July 29, 2014, Hayes and the Panthers agreed to a one-year, one-way contract for $925,000. In the 2014–15 season, Hayes played his first full season in the NHL with the Panthers, notching a career high 19 goals and 35 points in 72 games.

As a restricted free agent, on July 1, 2015, the Panthers traded Hayes to the Boston Bruins in exchange for Reilly Smith and the contract of injured Marc Savard. On July 6, 2015, Hayes agreed to terms on a three-year contract with the Bruins worth $2.3 million per year. Hayes' first goal as a Bruin came on October 14, 2015, in a 6–2 road victory against the hosting Colorado Avalanche. Just over two months later, in the second game of a home-on-home series against the Ottawa Senators, Hayes scored his first-ever NHL hat trick against Senators' goaltender Craig Anderson, as the initial, fifth and seventh Bruins goals (the seventh scored with only 0.2 seconds of game time remaining) for a 7–3 home ice Bruins win.

On June 30, 2017, after a career-worst season (2 goals, 5 points in 58 games) in 2016–17, Hayes was bought out from the remaining year of his contract by the Bruins.

On October 1, 2017, Hayes signed a one-year, one-way contract with the New Jersey Devils. In and out of the lineup, Hayes had three goals and six assists in 33 games.

On July 1, 2018, Hayes signed a one-year, two-way contract with the Pittsburgh Penguins. While participating at the Penguins training camp prior to the 2018–19 season, Hayes was reassigned to their AHL affiliate, the Wilkes-Barre/Scranton Penguins.

== Personal life ==
Hayes, along with his brother Kevin, was a cousin of former NHL players Tom Fitzgerald and Keith Tkachuk, as well as Tkachuk's sons Matthew and Brady, and Fitzgerald's sons Ryan, who was drafted by the Boston Bruins, and Casey, a Buffalo Sabres prospect.

After his retirement, Hayes started the podcast Missin Curfew with fellow former players Shane O'Brien and Scottie Upshall.

Hayes was found dead at the age of 31 at his Milton, Massachusetts, home on August 23, 2021. A toxicology report later determined fentanyl and cocaine use contributed to his death. At the time of his death, Hayes was married and had two sons.

== Career statistics ==
=== Regular season and playoffs ===
			Regular season					Playoffs
Season	Team	League	GP	G	A	Pts	PIM	GP	G	A	Pts	PIM
2004–05	Noble and Greenough School	HS-Prep	32	18	16	34	—	—	—	—	—	—
2005–06	Noble and Greenough School	HS-Prep	29	18	13	31		—	—	—	—	—
2006–07	U.S. NTDP U17	USDP	14	2	7	9	6	—	—	—	—	—
2006–07	U.S. NTDP U18	USDP	56	23	22	45	41	—	—	—	—	—
2006–07	U.S. NTDP U18	NAHL	14	6	8	14	4	—	—	—	—	—
2007–08	U.S. NTDP U18	USDP	23	2	6	8	6	—	—	—	—	—
2007–08	U.S. NTDP U18	NAHL	19	2	8	10	6	—	—	—	—	—
2007–08	Lincoln Stars	USHL	21	4	11	15	18	8	4	5	9	8
2008–09	Boston College	HE	36	8	5	13	22	—	—	—	—	—
2009–10	Boston College	HE	42	13	22	35	14	—	—	—	—	—
2010–11	Boston College	HE	39	21	12	33	24	—	—	—	—	—
2010–11	Rockford Icehogs	AHL	7	0	0	0	2	—	—	—	—	—
2011–12	Chicago Blackhawks	NHL	31	5	4	9	16	2	0	0	0	15
2011–12	Rockford Icehogs	AHL	33	7	16	23	11	—	—	—	—	—
2012–13	Rockford Icehogs	AHL	67	25	20	45	23	—	—	—	—	—
2012–13	Chicago Blackhawks	NHL	10	1	3	4	0	—	—	—	—	—
2013–14	Chicago Blackhawks	NHL	2	0	0	0	0	—	—	—	—	—
2013–14	Rockford Icehogs	AHL	13	4	4	8	2	—	—	—	—	—
2013–14	Florida Panthers	NHL	53	11	7	18	18	—	—	—	—	—
2014–15	Florida Panthers	NHL	72	19	16	35	20	—	—	—	—	—
2015–16	Boston Bruins	NHL	75	13	16	29	60	—	—	—	—	—
2016–17	Boston Bruins	NHL	58	2	3	5	29	—	—	—	—	—
2017–18	New Jersey Devils	NHL	33	3	6	9	6	—	—	—	—	—
2017–18	Binghamton Devils	AHL	3	0	2	2	0	—	—	—	—	—
2018–19	Wilkes-Barre/Scranton Penguins	AHL	72	15	15	30	25	—	—	—	—	—
NHL totals			334	54	55	109	149	2	0	0	0	15

Medal record

Ice hockey

Representing United States

World Junior A Challenge
Bronze medal – third place	2007 Trail	

IIHF World U18 Championship
Silver medal – second place	2007 Finland	

=== International ===
Year	Team	Event	Result	GP	G	A	Pts	PIM
2006	United States	U18	2nd place, silver medalist(s)	4	4	1	5	4
2007	United States	WJC18	2nd place, silver medalist(s)	7	1	2	3	2
2009	United States	WJC	5th	7	1	0	1	4
2014	United States	WC	6th	8	0	1	1	2
Junior totals				18	6	3	9	10
Senior totals				8	0	1	1	2
