= Ethan Brooks =

American football player (born 1972)

No. 73, 79, 77, 66, 70
- Position: Offensive tackle

Personal information
- Born: April 27, 1972 (age 54); Hartford, Connecticut, U.S.
- Listed height: 6 ft 6 in (1.98 m)
- Listed weight: 330 lb (150 kg)

Career information
- High school: Westminster (Simsbury, Connecticut)
- College: Williams
- NFL draft: 1996: 7th round, 229th overall pick

Career history
- Atlanta Falcons (1996); → Rhein Fire (1997); St. Louis Rams (1997–1998); Arizona Cardinals (2000); Denver Broncos (2001)*; Baltimore Ravens (2002–2004); New York Jets (2005)*; Dallas Cowboys (2005)
- * Offseason or practice squad member only

Awards and highlights
- 2× All-NESCAC (1994, 1995); NESCAC defensive player of the year (1995); All-WLAF (1997)

Career NFL statistics
- Games played: 76
- Games started: 26
- Stats at Pro Football Reference

Ethan Barbier Brooks (born April 27, 1972) is an American former professional football player who was an offensive tackle in the National Football League (NFL) for the Atlanta Falcons, St. Louis Rams, Arizona Cardinals, Baltimore Ravens and Dallas Cowboys. He played college football for the Williams Ephs.

== Early life ==
Brooks grew up in Simsbury, Connecticut. He attended Westminster School, a small prep school with a poor football record while he was there. He was not recruited by Division I-A schools, but had opportunities to play with a scholarship at Division I-AA schools.

His father Alan had gone to Wesleyan University and was later invited to the Baltimore Colts training camp. When Brooks graduated, Williams College had a better football program than Wesleyan and the other school of the "Little Three", Amherst College, good enough to be a Division III "football power".

== College career ==
Brooks had NFL aspirations and thought that the Division III level of play would not be the best route to the NFL. He intended to go to Bucknell University which had a superior football program as a Division I-AA program and was still a good academic institution. However, he did not think he would be accepted at Division III Williams College, because although his academics were good for a football player, they were low for the school. Nevertheless, Williams admitted him with financial aid and he chose to attend, because of both their stellar academic reputation and rich football tradition.

He became a starter at defensive tackle and stood out in the division for his size (270 pounds) and skill. He was also used on the offensive line to block in specific goal-line situations. As a sophomore, he took a year off to recover from a broken foot. He became a two-time All-conference player and the NESCAC defensive player of the year as a senior. He also contributed to his team having a 17-0-1 record in his final two seasons

He was an All-American in track and field in the hammer throw. On his last throw of the 35 lb. weight at the 1996 NCAA Indoor Championships, Brooks broke the NCAA Division III record with a heave of 63’ 8 ¾” and later that spring he won the NCAA hammer throw (194’ 2”). His major was psychology.

== Professional career ==
=== Atlanta Falcons ===
Brooks was selected by the Atlanta Falcons in the seventh round (229th overall) of the 1996 NFL draft, with the intention of being converted into an offensive tackle. He was moved back to the defensive line due to team injuries in training camp. As a rookie, he dressed for the final two games of the season.

In 1997, Dan Reeves replaced June Jones as the new Falcons head coach and Brooks was allocated to the World League of American Football. He made the All-WLAF first-team as a right tackle with the Rhein Fire, playing in World Bowl V. However, the league schedule forced him to miss the Falcons minicamps and was not able to appropriately learn the new offense being implemented. He was again moved back to defense and eventually waived on August 27.

=== St. Louis Rams ===
On November 20, 1997, he was signed as a free agent by the St. Louis Rams. In 1998, he played as the backup swing offensive tackle and on special teams in 15 games. In 1999, he was expected to compete for the starting right tackle position, but his wife Jackie was diagnosed with cancer, which impacted the time he could devote to training. He was released on July 19, because the team considered that he wasn't progressing as they'd hoped and he was also experiencing chronic back problems.

=== Arizona Cardinals ===
On February 3, 2000, he signed as a free agent with the Arizona Cardinals, after spending the 1999 season out of football. He appeared in 14 games with 3 starts. He was not re-signed after the season.

=== Denver Broncos ===
On March 15, 2001, he was signed as a "camp body" for the Denver Broncos. On August 28, he was cut after the third exhibition game, having had almost no playing time. He would return to Atlanta and eventually home to Connecticut.

=== Baltimore Ravens ===
A year after Jackie's death he was ready to start training again. His trainer, Charles Poliquin was headed to Arizona and Brooks followed him to get himself in football shape. On August 2, 2002, the Baltimore Ravens signed him as a free agent to play on the offensive line as a swing tackle backup, behind All-Pro left tackle Jonathan Ogden. He ended up playing in 15 games, starting 13 at right tackle.

On March 13, 2003, he was signed to a new two-year contract. Orlando Brown returned that season as the starting right tackle, having recovered from a freakish eye injury, and Brooks went back to being a swing backup tackle behind Brown and Ogden. He started 3 games in place of an injured Brown.

In 2004, he started 7 games at left tackle in place of an injured Ogden. He became an unrestricted free agent at the end of the season. He started 23 games in 3 years with the Ravens.

=== New York Jets ===
On May 23, 2005, he signed with the New York Jets, but was released at the end of training camp on August 27.

=== Dallas Cowboys ===
The Dallas Cowboys called him six weeks into the season and signed him on October 19, 2005. He played left tackle under head coach Bill Parcells, attempting to help replace the injured Pro Bowl player Flozell Adams. He was released just over a month later on November 27, to make room for offensive tackle Marcus Price.

== Personal life ==
Brooks met his wife Jaqueline Smith on a blind date during his first year in Atlanta. They were married in less than a year in the Spring of 1997. In the Fall of 1999 Jackie was diagnosed with Non-Hodgkin lymphoma. Brooks put football on the back burner while he stayed with his wife who was having chemotherapy treatment.

He also was struggling with a back injury and was released by the Rams. He turned down new signing offers from the Saints, Cowboys, Cardinals, and Jaguars. When the doctors pronounced Jackie in remission, he accepted an offer from the Arizona Cardinals for the 2000 season and made the team. Jackie joined him but she was already ill with a fatal recurrence and died in March 2001. Brooks did not tell many people about the situation and was not re-signed at the end of the season.

In September 2009, he joined the staff of the Pomfret School in Connecticut as a strength and conditioning coach. He left for a similar position at his alma mater, Williams College in 2011.

Brook's sister, Rebecca, was an All-American in soccer, basketball and outdoor track & field. His older brother Fletcher was the head coach of the Ephs men’s and women’s track & field teams, before moving on to Iowa State University in 2013.
