= Dan Geoffrion =

Canadian ice hockey player (born 1958)

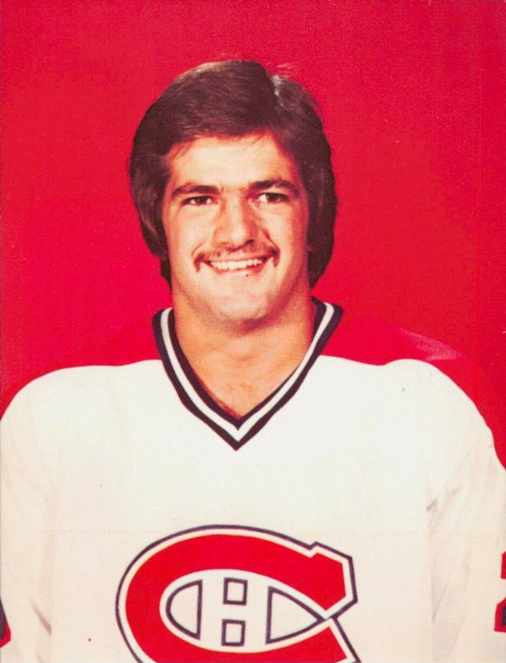
- 1979 photo of Geoffrion
- Born: January 24, 1958 (age 68) Montreal, Quebec, Canada
- Height: 5 ft 10 in (178 cm)
- Weight: 185 lb (84 kg; 13 st 3 lb)
- Position: Right wing
- Shot: Right
- Played for: Montreal Canadiens; Quebec Nordiques; Winnipeg Jets
- NHL draft: 8th overall, 1978; Montreal Canadiens
- Playing career: 1978–1983

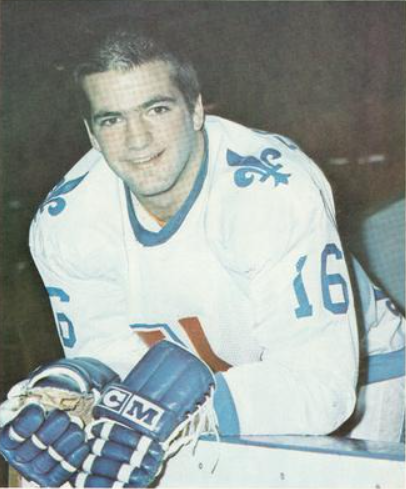
1978 Dimanche/Derniere Heure photo of Geoffrion for Quebec Nordiques

Daniel Jean-Paul "Danny" Geoffrion (born January 24, 1958) is a Canadian former professional ice hockey player who played 111 games in the National Hockey League (NHL) and 78 in the World Hockey Association. He played with the original Winnipeg Jets, Montreal Canadiens, and Quebec Nordiques. As a youth, he played in the 1971 Quebec International Pee-Wee Hockey Tournament with a minor ice hockey team from Dorval, Quebec.

Since his retirement from hockey, Dan is now a scout for the Toronto Maple Leafs.

== Personal ==
He is the son of NHL Hall of Famer Bernie Geoffrion and grandson of Howie Morenz.

He is the father of Blake Geoffrion, who played 67 career NHL games (regular season and playoffs) from 2010 until 2012.

Geoffrion is also the uncle of former Seattle Mariners outfielder Shane Monahan.

== Career statistics ==
			Regular season					Playoffs
Season	Team	League	GP	G	A	Pts	PIM	GP	G	A	Pts	PIM
1973–74	Cornwall Royals	QMJHL	28	6	5	11	5	4	0	2	2	2
1974–75	Cornwall Royals	QMJHL	71	33	53	86	70	4	2	1	3	5
1975–76	Cornwall Royals	QMJHL	53	42	58	100	123	10	4	11	15	15
1976–77	Cornwall Royals	QMJHL	65	39	57	96	148	—	—	—	—	—
1977–78	Cornwall Royals	QMJHL	71	68	75	143	183	9	4	12	16	37
1978–79	Quebec Nordiques	WHA	77	12	14	26	74	4	1	2	3	6
1979–80	Montreal Canadiens	NHL	32	0	6	6	12	2	0	0	0	7
1980–81	Winnipeg Jets	NHL	78	20	26	46	82	—	—	—	—	—
1981–82	Winnipeg Jets	NHL	1	0	0	0	5	—	—	—	—	—
1981–82	Tulsa Oilers	CHL	63	24	25	49	76	3	1	0	1	6
1982–83	Sherbrooke Jets	AHL	80	37	39	76	46	—	—	—	—	—
WHA totals			77	12	14	26	74	4	1	2	3	6
NHL totals			111	20	32	52	99	2	0	0	0	7

Preceded by Norm Dupont	Montreal Canadiens first-round draft pick 1978	Succeeded by Dave Hunter
