= Nicholas Acquavella =

American art dealer and gallerist

Nicola Mario “Nicholas” Acquavella jr
- Born: 1 July 1898; Padula, Salerno, Italy
- Died: 20 April 1987 (age 88); New York City, US
- Occupations: Art dealer and gallerist
- Known for: Founder, Acquavella Galleries
- Spouse: Michelina Editta "Edythe" Acquavella
- Children: William Acquavella

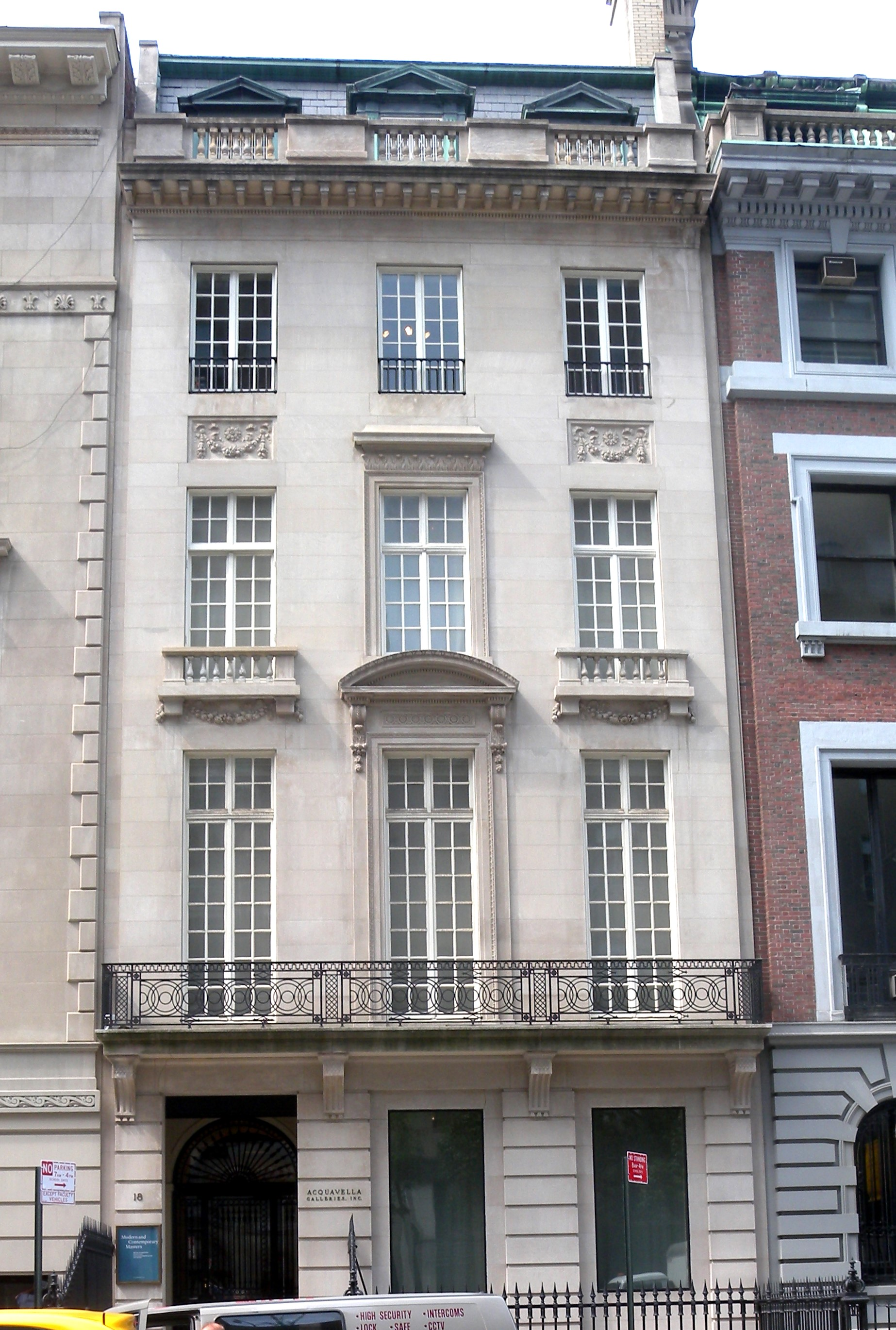
Acquavella Galleries

Nicola Mario "Nicholas" Acquavella (1898–1987) was an Italian-born, American art dealer and gallerist, and the founder of Acquavella Galleries.

== Early life ==
Acquavella was born on 1 July 1898, in Padula, near Salerno, Italy. He immigrated to the US in 1919, and started dealing privately in Italian art.

== Career ==
IN 1921, Nicholas founded Acquavella Galleries, at 598 Madison Avenue, where he continued to focus on Italian art while working with other European artists, most notably Lucian Freud.

In 1967, he moved his gallery to 18 East 79th Street, where it still based. In 1968, his son William Acquavella took over.

== Personal life ==
Nicholas Acquavella was married to Michelina Editta "Edythe" Acquavella (1911–2008), the daughter of Vincenzo Cardillo and Anna Della Valle.

They had one son, William Acquavella, and three grandchildren.

Nicholas Acquavella died on 20 April 1987 at Lenox Hill Hospital in New York City, aged 88.
