= William Acquavella =

American art dealer and gallerist

William “Bill” Acquavella
- Born: 1937 or 1938 (age 88–89)
- Occupation: Art dealer
- Known for: Acquavella Galleries
- Spouses: Hope Brown (m. 1966); Donna Acquavella
- Children: 3
- Parents: Nicholas Acquavella (father); Edythe Acquavella (mother)

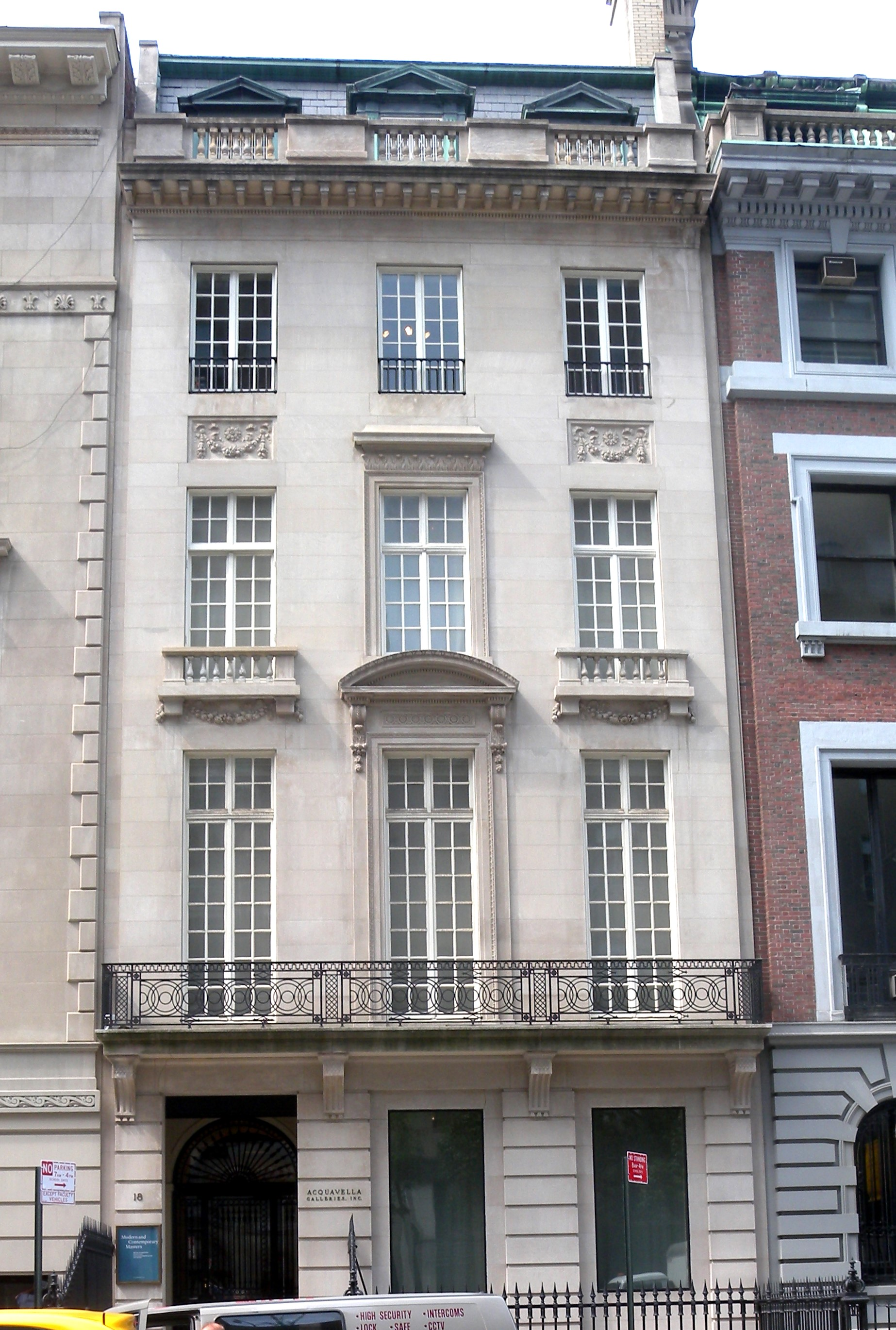
Acquavella Galleries

William Raymond Acquavella (born 1937/38) is an American art dealer and gallerist, and the head of Acquavella Galleries in New York City.

== Early life ==
William Raymond Acquavella is the son of Nicholas Acquavella, who founded Acquavella Galleries in 1921, and Edythe Acquavella. He was educated at Westminster School in Simsbury, Connecticut. He graduated from Washington and Lee University in Lexington, Virginia.

== Career ==
In 1992, he became Lucian Freud's dealer, agreeing to settle Freud's £2.7 million in gambling debts.

Acquavella negotiated the sale of a Picasso painting from Steve Wynn to Steve Cohen for $139 million, but it fell through when Wynn put his elbow through the painting.

Forbes included Acquavella in their 2012 list of the top ten art dealers.

Acquavella negotiated the November 2026 sale of the Vincent van Gogh painting Châtaigniers en fleurs (1890) for $190.4 million at Sotheby’s in New York, setting a record for the artist a day after the auction house announced an agreement over claims about the work’s Nazi-era sale.

== Personal life ==
Acquavella's own art collection is "dominated by Picasso, Matisse, and Miró", as well as Bonnard and Léger.

On May 21, 1966, in Shelburne, Vermont, Acquavella married Hope Brown, daughter of Mr. and Mrs. Archibald M. Brown. In 2000, their daughter Eleanor Hope Acquavella, then treasurer of Acquavella Galleries, married Morgan Andre Grace Dejoux.

Before 1990, Acquavella married his second wife, Donna. He has three children.
