= Erik Spady =

Canadian ice hockey player

- Born: June 1, 1989 (age 37) Deroche, British Columbia, Canada
- Height: 5 ft 11 in (180 cm)
- Weight: 205 lb (93 kg; 14 st 9 lb)
- Position: Defence
- Shoots: Right
- CHL team Former teams: Brampton Beast; AHL; Grand Rapids Griffins; ECHL; Toledo Walleye; CHL; Fort Worth Brahmas
- NHL draft: Undrafted
- Playing career: 2011–present

Erik Spady (born June 1, 1989) is a Canadian professional ice hockey defenceman. He last played with the Brampton Beast of the Central Hockey League.

Spady attended Northern Michigan University where he played four seasons (2007-2011) of NCAA college major hockey with the Northern Michigan Wildcats, registering 20 points and 110 penalty minutes in 134 games played.

Spady played the 2011–12 season in the Central Hockey League (CHL) with the Texas Brahmas. On January 15, 2013, the Toledo Walleye signed Spady to a contract and he joined the team mid-way through the 2012–13 ECHL season.
