= Acquavella Galleries =

Art gallery in Manhattan, New York

Coordinates: 40°46′35″N 73°57′45″W

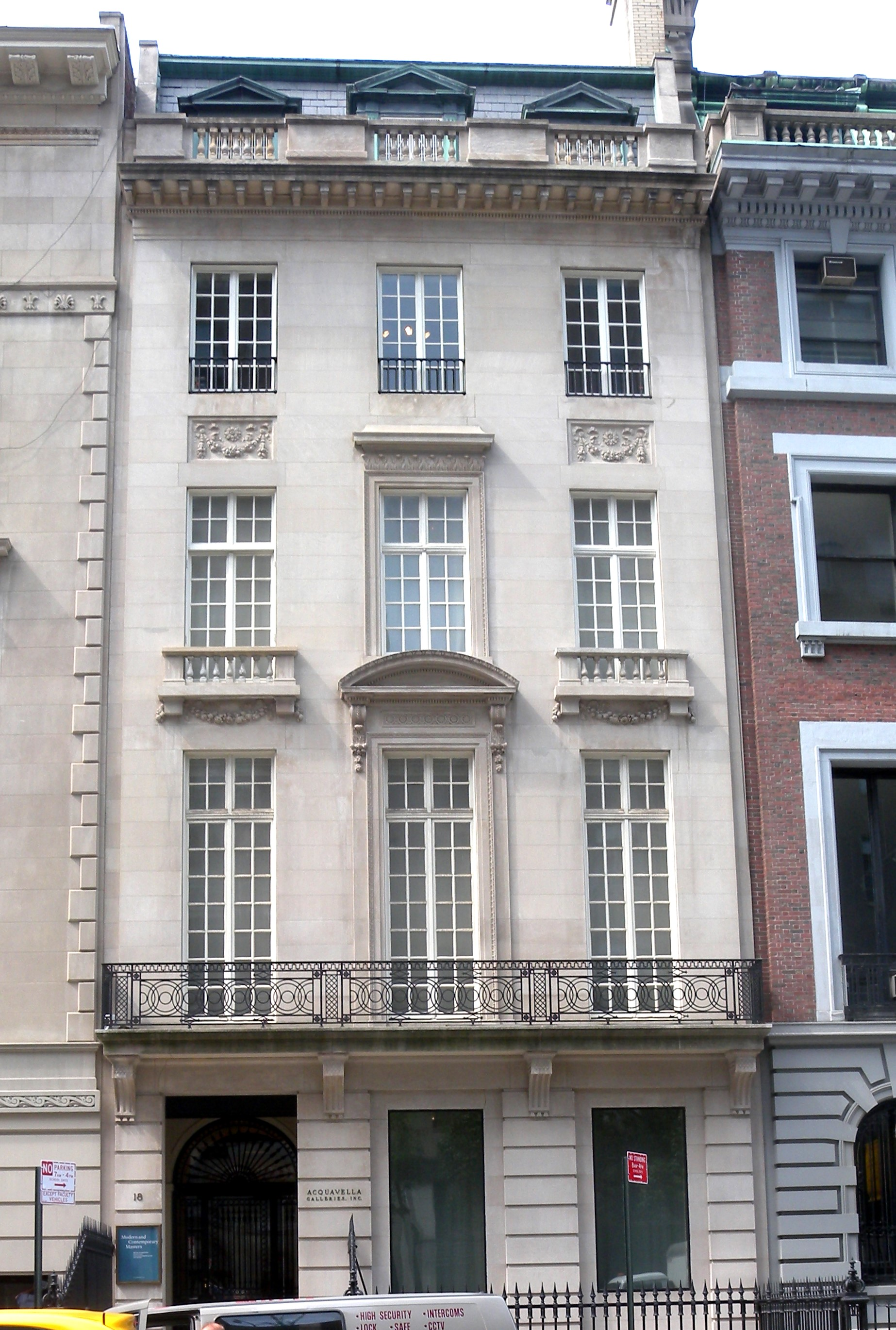
Acquavella Galleries

Acquavella Galleries is an art gallery located at 18 East 79th Street between Madison and Fifth Avenues on the Upper East Side of Manhattan, New York City.

== History ==
Acquavella Galleries was founded at 598 Madison Avenue in 1921 by Nicholas Acquavella, a native of Naples who had come to the United States in 1919 and begun a private trade in Italian paintings. The gallery has since been operated by the Acquavella family. It originally specialized in works of the Italian Renaissance. Under Acquavella's leadership, the Acquavella Galleries introduced many leading American museums and collectors to Italian Renaissance and Baroque painting, and later to 19th- and 20th-century European masters.

In 1960, William Acquavella joined his father and the focus of the gallery expanded to major works of the 19th and 20th centuries, including masters of Impressionism, Post-Impressionism, Surrealism and Cubism. William Acquavella's first real coup was buying 22 paintings in 1965 from the estate of the French painter Pierre Bonnard. Before mounting a show of the works, he sold 17 of them by mail. His international clientele included top museums and collectors like Henry Ford II, Paul Mellon, and Walter H. Annenberg. Acquavella later bought the collection of Edward G. Robinson in conjunction with Armand Hammer. Since 1967, the gallery has occupied an elegant five-story French neo-classical townhouse at 18 East 79th, once the New York outpost of London art firm founded by Joseph Duveen. Today, a range of 20th-century art is represented, including Pop Art and Abstract Expressionism.

In 1990, the gallery teamed up with Sotheby's auction house, to form Acquavella Modern Art, a subsidiary of Sotheby's Holding Company. The subsidiary paid $143 million for the contents of the Pierre Matisse Gallery in Manhattan, which included about 2,300 works by such artists as Miró, Jean Dubuffet, Alberto Giacometti, and Marc Chagall, and began selling the works both at auction and privately. As managing director of the partnership, William Acquavella used his expertise to market the artworks internationally.

Recently, William Acquavella has been joined by daughter Eleanor Dejoux and sons Nicholas and Alexander. In 2006, the gallery brokered a deal for the sale of a Picasso painting, Le Rêve, by the Las Vegas-based magnate Steve Wynn to the hedge fund manager Steven A. Cohen, for $139 million. The deal was cancelled after Wynn accidentally put his elbow through the canvas. In 2012, Picasso's Femme Assise Dans un Fauteuil (1941) to be offered at Sotheby's with a $20 million to $30 million presale estimate was damaged while in the care of Acquavella Galleries, according to a lawsuit filed in New York State Supreme Court by the insurer of its owner, Ted Forstmann.

== Exhibitions ==
Numerous exhibitions have been presented at the gallery, including the works of Monet, Degas, Cézanne, Renoir, Pissarro, Bonnard, Tanguy, Léger, Picasso, Modigliani, Matisse, Rauschenberg, Sisley, Segonzac, Feininger, Giacometti, and Miró. Until his death in 2011, the gallery was the international agent for the British painter Lucian Freud. Today the gallery represents Wayne Thiebaud, Miquel Barceló, Jacob El Hanani, and Damian Loeb.
