= Nicklas Jensen =

Danish ice hockey player (born 1993)

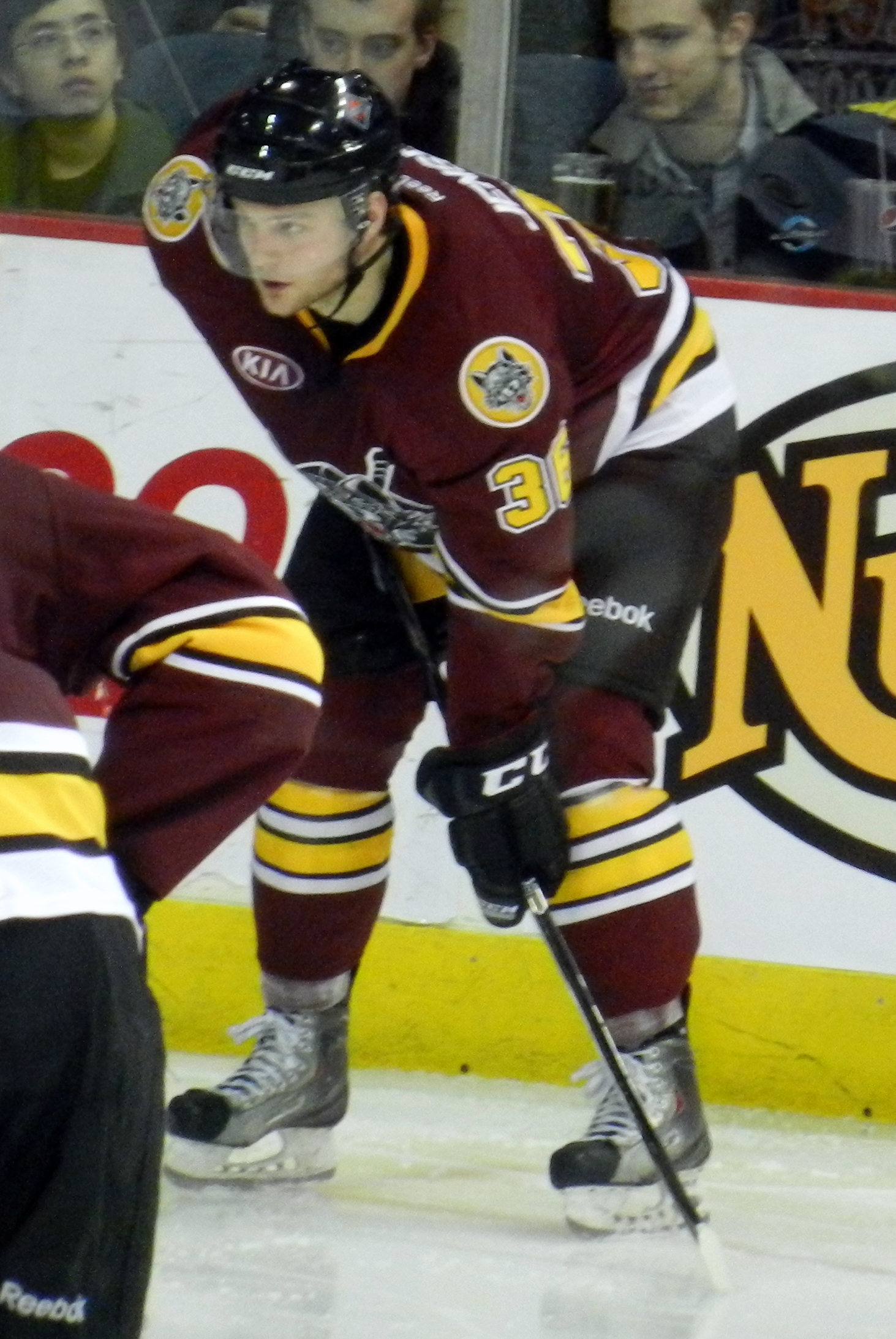
- Jensen with the Chicago Wolves in 2013
- Born: 6 March 1993 (age 33) Herning, Denmark
- Height: 6 ft 3 in (191 cm)
- Weight: 186 lb (84 kg; 13 st 4 lb)
- Position: Winger
- Shoots: Left
- NL team Former teams: SC Rapperswil-Jona Lakers; Herning IK; AIK IF; Vancouver Canucks; New York Rangers; Jokerit
- National team: Denmark
- NHL draft: 29th overall, 2011; Vancouver Canucks
- Playing career: 2009–present

Nicklas Jensen (born 6 March 1993) is a Danish professional ice hockey player who is a winger for SC Rapperswil-Jona Lakers of the National League (NL).

After beginning his career with Danish team Herning Blue Fox at the junior and men's level, Jensen moved to North America in 2010 to play with the Oshawa Generals. Named to the OHL All-Rookie Team following his first year with the club, he was ranked 21st among North American skaters eligible for the 2011 NHL entry draft, where he was selected by the Vancouver Canucks 29th overall. Jensen spent most of the 2012–13 season with AIK of the Swedish Elitserien before returning to North America and playing for Chicago, the AHL affiliate of the Canucks. Jensen made his NHL debut with Vancouver in 2013 and appeared in 24 games for the Canucks over three seasons, spending most of his time with the team's AHL affiliates, the Chicago Wolves and Utica Comets, before being traded to the New York Rangers in 2016.

Jensen played for the Danish national junior team at two IIHF World U18 Championships at the Division I level and won Best Forward in 2010. He also played in two IIHF World Junior Championships and helped Denmark win their group at the 2011 Division I tournament. Jensen has also played for the Danish senior team at three World Championships.

== Early life ==
Jensen was born in Herning, Denmark. His father, Dan, was born in Toronto and played in the Ontario Hockey League from 1986 to 1989 before moving to Denmark, where he met his wife. Jensen grew up while Dan played for the Herning Blue Fox, as well as the Danish national team. In addition to hockey, he played soccer, the country's national sport, until he was 14 years old. Despite arriving in the Ontario Hockey League (OHL) as an import player, he lived near many relatives, due to his father's Canadian heritage. Playing with the Oshawa Generals, his paternal grandparents Poul and Utta Jensen, as well as two uncles live nearby Richmond Hill, Ontario.

== Playing career ==
Following after his father, Jensen began his career with his hometown team, the Herning Blue Fox. Spending most of the 2008–09 season with the team's junior side, he recorded 43 points (28 goals and 15 assists) over 28 games. He also debuted at the men's level during the season, recording three goals over four games with Herning's second-tier team. The following season, he was promoted to Herning's premier team in Denmark's top professional league, AL-Bank Ligaen. With 12 goals and 26 points over 34 games, he won the league's Rookie of the Year award.

After being selected eighth overall in the 2010 Canadian Hockey League (CHL) Import Draft by the Oshawa Generals, of the Ontario Hockey League (OHL) Jensen moved to North America to join the team for the 2010–11 season. Making his OHL debut on 23 September 2010, he scored the deciding goal in a 5–4 win against the Peterborough Petes. Several months into the campaign, he began a seven-game goal-scoring streak, scoring 10 times from 3 December 2010, to 9 January 2011; it tied for the third-longest streak in the league that season. Midway through the campaign, he was named OHL Player of the Week after recording seven points (three goals and four assists) over three games from 10 to 16 January 2011. His award-winning week included a five-point game (one goal and four assists) against the Ottawa 67's. That same month, he competed in the 2011 CHL Top Prospects Game for Team Cherry, alongside Generals teammates Boone Jenner and Lucas Lessio. Jensen completed his OHL rookie campaign with 58 points (29 goals and 29 assists) over 61 games. Ranking fifth in scoring among first-year players, he was named to the OHL Second All-Rookie Team. In the 2011 playoffs, he added 11 points (7 goals and 4 assists) over 10 games, ranking third among league rookies. His efforts helped the Generals to the second round, where they were eliminated in five games by the Niagara IceDogs.

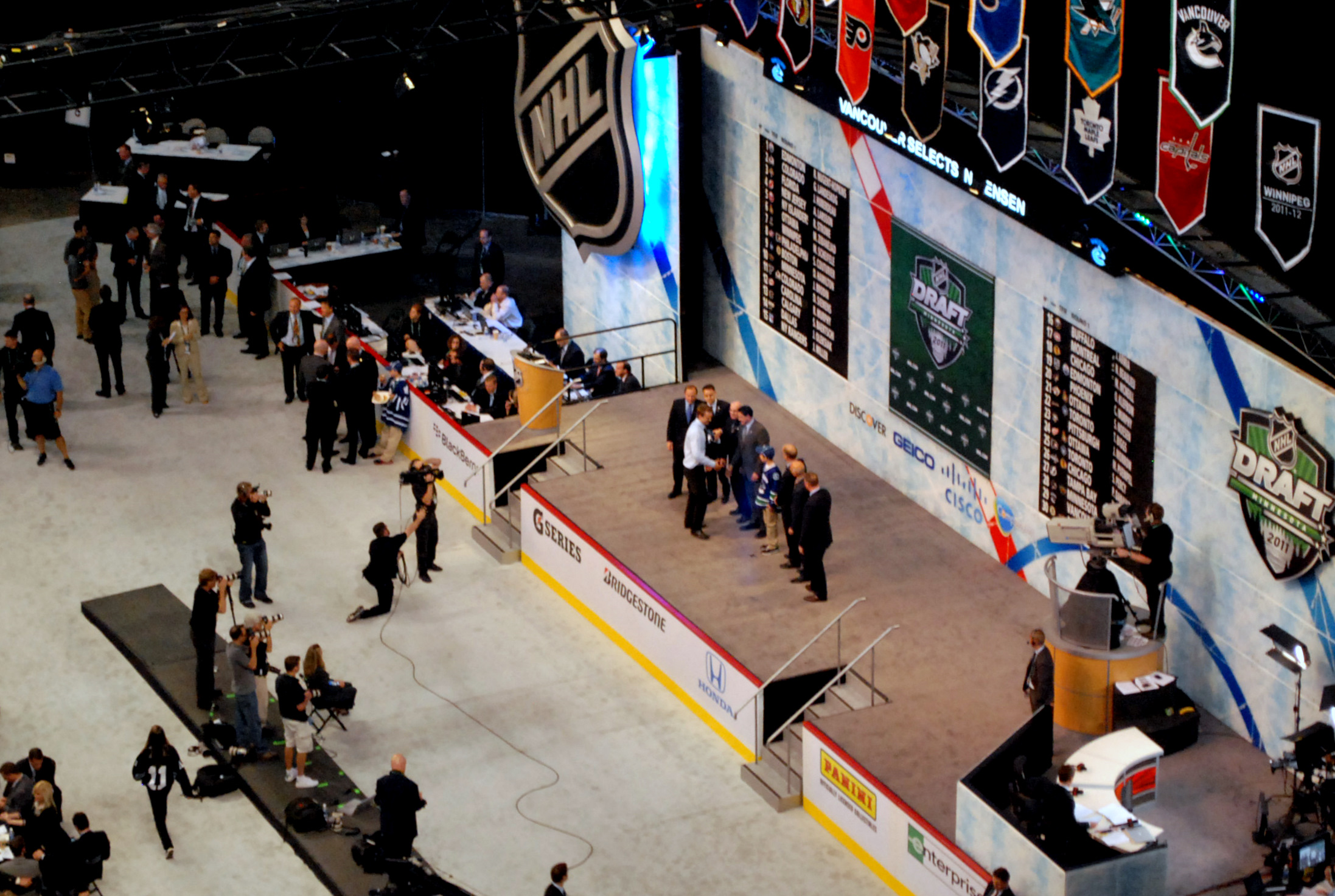
The stage at the 2011 NHL entry draft after Jensen was selected by Vancouver.

Going into the 2011 NHL entry draft, Jensen was ranked 21st among prospects playing in North America by NHL Central Scouting Bureau. He was selected 29th overall by the Vancouver Canucks. Following his draft, he characterized himself as "a power forward and goal scorer who protects the puck well", while the Canucks assistant general manager Laurence Gilman highlighted the quick release of his shot. Gilman also described him as a player high in "character and work ethic". In becoming a part of the Canucks organization, Jensen joined countryman Jannik Hansen, who led a wave of Danish players beginning to play in the NHL.

Following his NHL pre-season debut, Jensen signed a three-year, entry-level contract with the Canucks on 22 September 2011. Canucks head coach Alain Vigneault praised Jensen's play in his training camp performance, but asserted that he still needed development to play in the NHL. By the end of the month, he was returned to the Generals to continue at the junior level. Playing his second OHL season, Jensen scored at a similar pace to his rookie year with 25 goals and 58 points over 57 games. He added five points in six playoff games.

After the Generals were eliminated in the first round of the 2012 OHL playoffs, Jensen was assigned to the Canucks' American Hockey League affiliate, the Chicago Wolves. He made his professional debut on 6 April 2012, against the Houston Aeros, before scoring his first professional goal two games later against Texas Stars goaltender Jack Campbell in a 5–2 loss. In the last game of the regular season later that month, he recorded a hat trick in a 4–2 win against the Peoria Rivermen on 15 April 2012. Playing the San Antonio Rampage in the first game of the 2012 playoffs, Jensen scored two goals in a 5–4 loss. His series was cut short when he suffered a concussion the following game after receiving an elbow to the head.

The Canucks assigned Jensen to AIK of the Elitserien, the top professional league in Sweden, for the 2012–13 season. Jensen scored 17 goals and 23 points in 50 games with AIK, leading the team in goals and tied for fourth with points. He also led all Elitserien rookies in goal scoring and was tied for eleventh overall. After the Elitserien season ended in early March, the Canucks assigned Jensen to the Chicago Wolves; he joined the team on 8 March 2013. Jensen played 11 games for Chicago, scoring two goals and four points. After a series of injuries to the Canucks' line-up, he was recalled in hopes of adding an offensive spark to the team. He made his National Hockey League (NHL) debut on 1 April 2013 in a game versus the San Jose Sharks. After Mason Raymond and Dale Weise returned from injury Jensen was reassigned to Chicago. He went pointless in two games.

Jensen scored his first NHL goal on 14 March 2014, against Jaroslav Halak of the Washington Capitals.

On 8 January 2016, while with AHL affiliate, the Utica Comets, Jensen was traded by the Canucks along with a 6th round draft pick in 2017 to the New York Rangers in exchange for forward Emerson Etem. On 20 April 2016, Jensen was recalled by the New York Rangers from the team's AHL affiliate, the Hartford Wolf Pack.

After parts of two seasons with the Rangers, Jensen featured in just seven games going scoreless. Unable to break through with the Rangers following the 2016–17 season, Jensen's KHL rights, originally attained by Salavat Yulaev Ufa in the 2012 KHL Draft, were traded to Finnish outfit Jokerit on 20 April 2017. As a restricted free agent from the Rangers, Jensen opted to pause his NHL aspirations in agreeing to an optional two-year contract with Jokerit on 12 July 2017.

Jensen played five seasons with Jokerit before the team withdrew from the KHL during the 2021–22 season due to the Russian invasion of Ukraine. As a free agent in the off-season, Jensen moved to the Swiss National League, signing a two-year contract with SC Rapperswil-Jona Lakers on 6 May 2022.

== International play ==
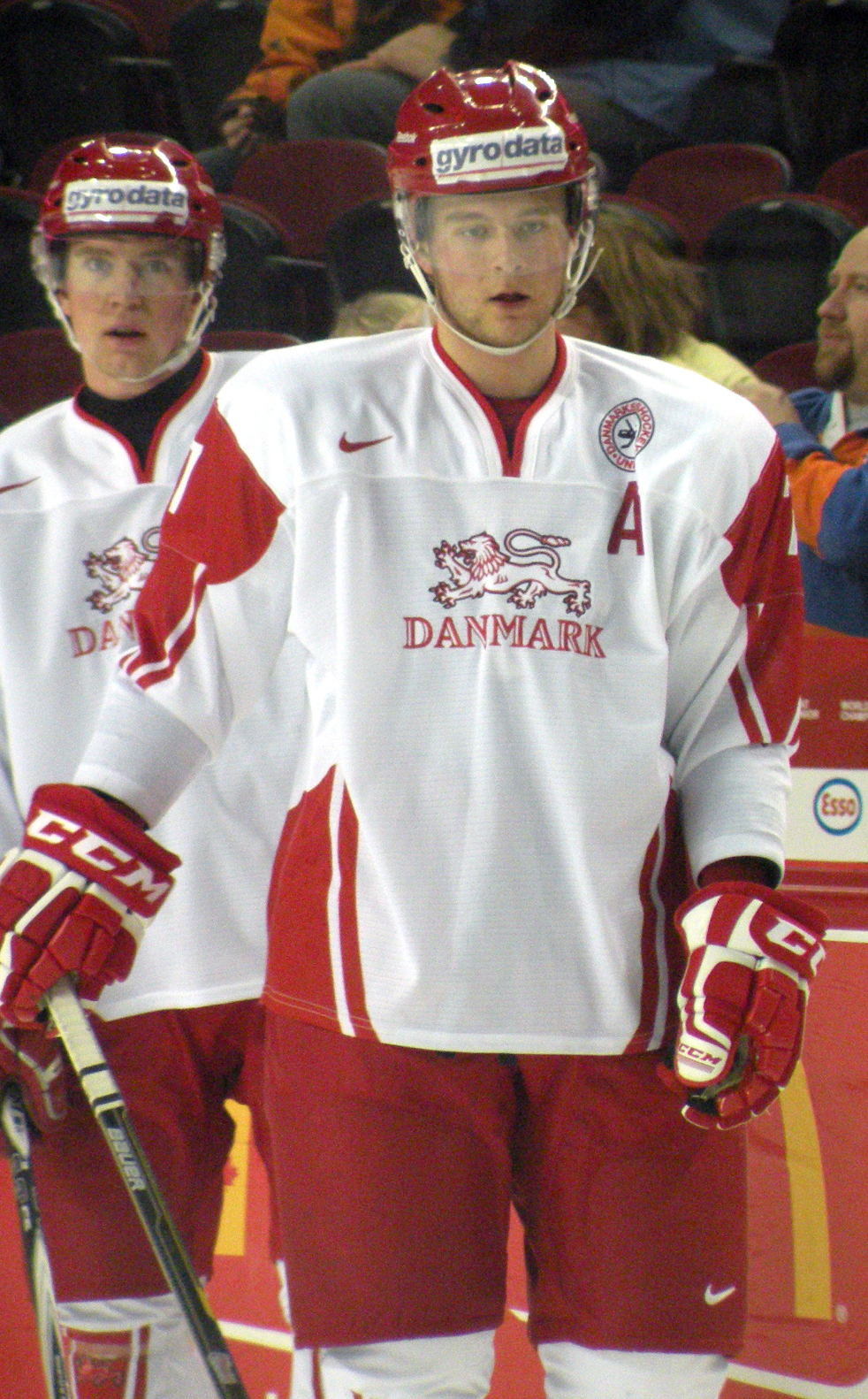

Medal record

Representing Denmark

Ice hockey

IIHF World U18 Championships
Silver medal – second place	2009 Italy	Division I Group B
Silver medal – second place	2010 Denmark	Division I Group A

World Junior Ice Hockey Championships
Silver medal – second place	2010 France	Division I Group A
Gold medal – first place	2011 Slovenia	Division I Group B

Although Jensen is a dual citizen of Denmark, where he was born, and Canada, where his father was born, he chose to play for the Danish national team. He debuted internationally for Denmark in Division I play of the 2009 IIHF World U18 Championship, held in Asiago, Italy. (Note: Division I is the second-highest level of play in the tournament.) At 16 years old, he was the youngest player on the team. He registered one assist over five games, helping Denmark to second place in their pool. They finished two points shy of first place, which would have qualified them for the main division the following year. (Note: There are two pools who play separate round robins in Division I competition. The top-ranked team from each pool earns a promotion to the top division for the following year. Top-ranked Latvia won four games and lost one in regulation for 12 points. Denmark won three games, lost one in regulation, and lost one in overtime for 10 points.)

Seven months later, Jensen joined Denmark's under-20 team, competing in Division I of the 2010 World Junior Championships, held in Megeve and Saint-Gervais, France. Once again the youngest player on the team, he tied for third among Danish players in scoring with five points (three goals and two assists) over five games while recording a team-leading 19 shots on goal. Denmark finished second in Pool A, missing out on a promotion to the 2011 tournament's main division by one win. (Note: Top-ranked Germany went undefeated in five games, while Denmark lost one game.)

The following year, Jensen returned to the under-18 team for the 2010 IIHF World U18 Championships, which was held in his hometown of Herning, Denmark. In the tournament's first game, he scored five goals against France, leading Denmark to a 7–4 win. He was named his team's player of the game. In a later 13–3 win against Korea, Jensen recorded a hat trick, as well as one assist. Going undefeated after four games, Denmark played Norway (also undefeated) in the final contest of the tournament, with the winner deciding who would earn a promotion to the top division the following year. Jensen recorded a goal and an assist in the match, as Denmark lost 5–4. Finishing with a team-leading 15 points over 5 games, including a pool-leading 13 goals, Jensen was distinguished as Denmark's best player and the pool's best forward by the coaches and the directorate, respectively.

In December 2010, Jensen made his second appearance at the under-20 level in the 2011 IIHF World Junior Championships Division I tournament, held in Slovenia. Recording two goals and five points over five games, as well as a team-leading 28 shots on goal, he helped Denmark to the top spot in their pool and a promotion to the top division for the 2012 tournament. Denmark had tied with Slovenia for first place in Pool B with four wins and one loss each, but won by virtue of having won their game against them 2–1.

Jensen made his third appearance for Denmark's under-20 team in the 2012 World Junior Championships. It was his first time competing in the top division of an international tournament (all his previous appearances had been in second-tier Division I play). Jensen was chosen to the team as the lone player competing with a North American club at the time (the Oshawa Generals) and was also named an alternate captain. (Note: He was one of two alternate captains with defenceman Mark Larsen, while Jannik Christensen was named captain.) During the preliminary round, Jensen was named Denmark's player of the game after recording an assist and five shots on goal in a 10–2 loss to Canada. Denmark finished the tournament in last place, relegating them to Division I for the 2013 World Juniors. Jensen led his team in scoring with two goals and six points over six games.

Following his 2011–12 season, in which he made his professional debut, it was expected that Jensen would be named to the Danish national team for the 2012 IIHF World Championship, but he had sustained a concussion during the 2012 AHL playoffs, which may have dissuaded the Danish team officials from selecting him. Jensen would make his debut at the World Championships in 2013 when he was added to Denmark's roster following the elimination of the Vancouver Canucks from the Stanley Cup playoffs. Jensen recorded two goals in three games at the tournament as Denmark finished in 12th place.

== Career statistics ==
=== Regular season and playoffs ===
			Regular season					Playoffs
Season	Team	League	GP	G	A	Pts	PIM	GP	G	A	Pts	PIM
2008–09	Herning Blue Fox	DEN U20	28	28	15	43	30	2	1	0	1	0
2008–09	Herning Blue Fox II	DEN.2	4	3	0	3	0	—	—	—	—	—
2009–10	Herning Blue Fox	DEN	34	12	14	26	28	10	6	4	10	8
2010–11	Oshawa Generals	OHL	61	29	29	58	42	10	7	4	11	2
2011–12	Oshawa Generals	OHL	57	25	33	58	29	6	1	4	5	0
2011–12	Chicago Wolves	AHL	6	4	0	4	6	2	2	0	2	0
2012–13	AIK	SEL	50	17	6	23	16	—	—	—	—	—
2012–13	Chicago Wolves	AHL	20	2	2	4	8	—	—	—	—	—
2012–13	Vancouver Canucks	NHL	2	0	0	0	0	—	—	—	—	—
2013–14	Utica Comets	AHL	54	15	6	21	26	—	—	—	—	—
2013–14	Vancouver Canucks	NHL	17	3	3	6	10	—	—	—	—	—
2014–15	Utica Comets	AHL	59	14	14	28	39	18	4	1	5	10
2014–15	Vancouver Canucks	NHL	5	0	0	0	0	—	—	—	—	—
2015–16	Utica Comets	AHL	27	4	8	12	20	—	—	—	—	—
2015–16	Hartford Wolf Pack	AHL	41	15	10	25	12	—	—	—	—	—
2016–17	Hartford Wolf Pack	AHL	70	32	23	55	58	—	—	—	—	—
2016–17	New York Rangers	NHL	7	0	0	0	0	—	—	—	—	—
2017–18	Jokerit	KHL	54	19	18	37	36	11	1	5	6	4
2018–19	Jokerit	KHL	48	21	18	39	32	6	2	1	3	2
2019–20	Jokerit	KHL	27	15	10	25	26	6	3	4	7	2
2020–21	Jokerit	KHL	54	18	13	31	31	4	1	0	1	12
2021–22	Jokerit	KHL	37	19	15	34	39	—	—	—	—	—
2022–23	SC Rapperswil-Jona Lakers	NL	12	6	5	11	29	—	—	—	—	—
2023–24	SC Rapperswil-Jona Lakers	NL	37	9	11	20	18	—	—	—	—	—
2024–25	SC Rapperswil-Jona Lakers	NL	48	16	13	29	14	2	1	1	2	0
2025–26	SC Rapperswil-Jona Lakers	NL	17	6	3	9	6	9	1	2	3	8
NHL totals			31	3	3	6	10	—	—	—	—	—
KHL totals			220	92	74	166	164	27	7	10	17	20

=== International ===
Year	Team	Event	GP	G	A	Pts	PIM
2009	Denmark	WJC18 D1	5	0	1	1	6
2010	Denmark	WJC D1	5	3	2	5	2
2010	Denmark	WJC18 D1	5	13	2	15	14
2011	Denmark	WJC D1	5	2	3	5	10
2012	Denmark	WJC	6	2	4	6	4
2013	Denmark	OGQ	2	0	0	0	2
2013	Denmark	WC	3	2	0	2	2
2014	Denmark	WC	7	1	1	2	8
2016	Denmark	WC	8	5	2	7	6
2016	Denmark	OGQ	3	1	3	4	2
2018	Denmark	WC	7	2	0	2	8
2019	Denmark	WC	7	2	2	4	12
2021	Denmark	WC	7	5	3	8	2
2021	Denmark	OGQ	3	0	0	0	0
2022	Denmark	OG	4	0	1	1	2
2023	Denmark	WC	7	2	4	6	0
2024	Denmark	OGQ	3	2	2	4	2
2025	Denmark	WC	10	0	7	7	4
2026	Denmark	OG	4	0	0	0	0
Junior totals			20	18	8	26	32
Senior totals			64	19	20	39	44

== Awards ==
Award	Year
AL-Bank Ligaen Rookie of the Year	2009–10
Best Forward – IIHF World U18 Division I (Pool A)	2010
Denmark's Best Player – IIHF World U18	2010
OHL All-Rookie Team	2010–11

== Notes ==
Awards and achievements
Preceded by Jordan Schroeder	Vancouver Canucks first-round draft pick 2011	Succeeded by Brendan Gaunce
