= 2007 Hockey East men's ice hockey tournament =

American college hockey tournament

2007 Hockey East Men's ice hockey tournament
- Dates: March 8–17, 2007
- Teams: 8
- Finals site: TD Banknorth Garden; Boston, Massachusetts
- Champions: Boston College (7th title)
- Winning coach: Jerry York (5th title)
- MVP: Brock Bradford (Boston College)
- Hockey East Men's Ice Hockey Tournaments

The 2007 Hockey East Men's Ice Hockey Tournament was the 23rd tournament in the history of the conference. It was played between March 8 and March 17, 2007. Quarterfinal games were played at home team campus sites, while the final four games were played at the TD Banknorth Garden in Boston, Massachusetts, the home venue of the NHL's Boston Bruins. By winning the tournament Boston College received the Hockey East's automatic bid to the 2007 NCAA Division I Men's Ice Hockey Tournament.

== Format ==
The tournament featured three rounds of play. The teams that finish below eighth in the conference are not eligible for tournament play. In the first round, the first and eighth seeds, the second and seventh seeds, the third seed and sixth seeds, and the fourth seed and fifth seeds played a best-of-three with the winner advancing to the semifinals. In the semifinals, the highest and lowest seeds and second highest and second lowest seeds play a single-elimination game, with the winner advancing to the championship game. The tournament champion receives an automatic bid to the 2007 NCAA Division I Men's Ice Hockey Tournament.

== Conference standings ==
Note: GP = Games played; W = Wins; L = Losses; T = Ties; PTS = Points; GF = Goals For; GA = Goals Against

2006–07 Hockey East standings
	Conference							Overall					
	GP	W	L	T	PTS	GF	GA	GP	W	L	T	GF	GA
#9 New Hampshire†	27	18	7	2	38	96	62	39	26	11	2	139	89
#2 Boston College*	27	18	8	1	37	89	65	40	29	12	1	142	94
#13 Boston University	27	13	6	8	34	69	51	39	20	10	9	99	78
#12 Massachusetts	27	15	9	3	33	71	63	39	21	13	5	109	91
#6 Maine	27	14	12	1	29	80	69	40	23	15	2	133	99
Vermont	27	12	10	5	29	55	56	39	18	16	5	87	78
Northeastern	27	9	13	5	23	60	66	36	13	18	5	84	94
Providence	27	9	15	3	21	66	71	36	10	23	3	76	108
Massachusetts–Lowell	27	7	16	4	18	51	76	36	8	21	7	74	104
Merrimack	27	3	22	2	8	28	86	34	3	27	4	37	111
Championship: Boston College † indicates conference regular season champion * indicates conference tournament champion Final rankings: USA Today/USA Hockey Magazine Top 15 Poll

== Bracket ==
Quarterfinals; March 8–10
1	New Hampshire	4	6	–
8	Providence	0	0	–
2	Boston College	3	7	–
7	Northeastern	0	1	–
(Pairings are reseeded after the first round)
3	Boston University	2	2	3*
6	Vermont	3	0	2
4	Massachusetts	3	5	–
5	Maine	2	2	–

Semifinals; March 16
1	New Hampshire	3**
4	Massachusetts	2
2	Boston College	6
3	Boston University	2

Championship; March 17
1	New Hampshire	2
2	Boston College	5

Note: * denotes overtime period(s)

=== Quarterfinals ===
==== (1) New Hampshire vs. (8) Providence ====
March 8	New Hampshire	4 – 0	Providence	Whittemore Center	Recap
(Radja, Micflikier) Brett Hemingway - GW - 04:25 (LeBlanc) Bobby Butler - 11:43		First period	No scoring
(Hemingway, Radja) Jacob Micflikier - 09:33		Second period	No scoring
(Radja) Brad Flaishans - 04:17		Third period	No scoring
( 20 saves / 22 shots ) Kevin Regan		Goalie stats	Tyler Sims ( 10 saves / 12 shots ) / Chris Mannix ( 12 saves / 14 shots )

March 9	New Hampshire	6 – 0	Providence	Whittemore Center	Recap
(Radja, Micflikier) Chris Murray - GW PP - 07:11 (Micflikier, Radja) Brett Hemingway - PP - 15:41		First period	No scoring
(Ciocco) Thomas Fortney - 02:55 (Collins, Murray) Thomas Fortney - 07:44 (Pollastrone, Fornataro) Trevor Smith - PP - 13:14		Second period	No scoring
(Murray, Smith) Matt Fornataro - 13:58		Third period	No scoring
( 42 saves / 42 shots ) Kevin Regan		Goalie stats	Chris Mannix ( 18 saves / 24 shots )

New Hampshire won series 2–0

==== (2) Boston College vs. (7) Northeastern ====
March 11	Boston College	3 – 0	Northeastern	Conte Forum	Recap
(Gerbe, Boyle) Brock Bradford - GW - 18:21		First period	No scoring
(Motherwell, Gerbe) Ben Smith - PP - 06:06		Second period	No scoring
(Smith, Gerbe) Brock Bradford - 12:06		Third period	No scoring
( 25 saves / 25 shots ) Cory Schneider		Goalie stats	Brad Thiessen ( 26 saves / 29 shots )

March 9	Boston College	7 – 1	Northeastern	Conte Forum	Recap
(Ferriero, Kunes) Joe Rooney - 12:42 (Gerbe, Boyle) Benn Ferriero - GW PP - 16:10 (Bradford, Motherwell) Benn Ferriero - PP - 18:02 (Gerbe, Motherwell) Brock Bradford - PP - 19:40		First period	02:11 - Ryan Ginand
(Ferriero, Motherwell) Brian Boyle - PP - 08:53 (Motherwell, Bradford) Dan Bertram - 13:49 (Orpik, Kucharski) Matt Lombardi - 15:42		Second period	No scoring
No scoring		Third period	No scoring
( 21 saves / 22 shots ) Cory Schneider / ( 3 saves / 3 shots ) Joe Pearce		Goalie stats	Brad Thiessen ( 12 saves / 18 shots ) / Adam Geragosian ( 10 saves / 11 shots )

Boston College won series 2–0

==== (3) Boston University vs. (6) Vermont ====
March 8	Boston University	2 – 3	Vermont	Agganis Arena	Recap
(Gryba) John McCarthy - 02:19 (Ewing, MacArthur) Kenny Roche - 14:32		First period	03:18 - EA - Mark Lutz (Lenes, Strong); 09:24 - Peter Lenes (Strong)
No scoring		Second period	01:52 - GW - Brayden Irwin (Stålberg)
No scoring		Third period	No scoring
( 24 saves / 27 shots ) John Curry		Goalie stats	Joe Fallon ( 20 saves / 22 shots )

March 9	Boston University	2 – 0	Vermont	Agganis Arena	Recap
No Scoring		First period	No scoring
(Yip, Higgins) Pete MacArthur - GW PP - 10:59		Second period	No scoring
(Lawrence, Ewing) Brian Strait - 13:52		Third period	No scoring
( 29 saves / 29 shots ) John Curry		Goalie stats	Joe Fallon ( 23 saves / 25 shots )

March 10	Boston University	3 – 2	OT	Vermont	Agganis Arena	Recap
(Thomassian, MacArthur) Chris Higgins - 09:33 (Sullivan, McGoff) Jason Lawrence - PP - 17:08		First period		No scoring
No scoring		Second period		16:22 - Viktor Stålberg
No scoring		Third period		06:52 - PP - Peter Lenes (Lutz, Gunderson)
(Gilroy, MacArthur) Brandon Yip - GW PP - 09:22		First overtime period		No scoring
( 24 saves / 26 shots ) John Curry		Goalie stats		Joe Fallon ( 31 saves / 34 shots )

Boston University won series 2–1

==== (4) Massachusetts vs. (5) Maine ====
March 9	Massachusetts	3 – 2	Maine	William D. Mullins Memorial Center	Recap
No Scoring		First period	13:22 - PP - Billy Ryan (Soares, Tyler)
(Fenton, Berry) Kevin Jarman - PP - 07:00		Second period	No scoring
(Quirk, Leaderer) Alex Berry - 05:39 (Otriz, Kostka) John Wessbecker - GW - 11:12		Third period	12:40 - PP - Brent Shepheard (Lundin, Léveillé)
( 38 saves / 40 shots ) Jonathan Quick		Goalie stats	Dave Wilson ( 21 saves / 24 shots )

March 10	Massachusetts	5 – 2	Maine	William D. Mullins Memorial Center	Recap
(Burto, Kostka) Chris Capraro - 08:21 (Braun, Capraro) Cory Quirk - 15:27		First period	16:07 - PP - Teddy Purcell (Shepheard, Léveillé)
(Capraro, Kostka) Matt Burto - GW - 04:45 (Matheson, Crowder) Matt Anderson - 12:54		Second period	No scoring
P. J. Fenton - EN - 18:41		Third period	06:14 - Billy Ryan (Purcell, Lundin)
( 35 saves / 37 shots ) Jonathan Quick		Goalie stats	Dave Wilson ( 23 saves / 27 shots )

Massachusetts won series 2–0

=== Semifinals ===
==== (1) New Hampshire vs. (4) Massachusetts ====
March 16	New Hampshire	3 – 2	2OT	Massachusetts	TD Banknorth Garden	Recap
(Butler, Fortney) Greg Collins - 03:29		First period		18:00 Alex Berry (Leaderer)
(Vinz) Dan Rossman - 13:57		Second period		00:16 - Chris Capraro (Quirk, Burto)
No scoring		Third period		No scoring
(Collins) Bobby Butler - GW - 01:30		Second overtime period		No scoring
( 44 saves / 46 shots ) Kevin Regan		Goalie stats		Jonathan Quick ( 38 saves / 41 shots )

==== (2) Boston College vs. (3) Boston University ====
March 16	Boston College	6 – 2	Boston University	TD Banknorth Garden	Recap
(Ferriero, Motherwell) Brock Bradford - PP - 07:46 (Boyle, Rooney) Benn Ferriero - 15:00		First period	No scoring
(Rooney, Bertram) Ben Smith - GW - 14:05 (Smith, Boyle) Brock Bradford - 15:00		Second period	No scoring
(Smith) Joe Rooney - 09:33 (Boyle, Bradford) Nathan Gerbe - PP - 16:18		Third period	01:25 - Brandon Yip (Gilroy, MacArthur); 14:35 - Bryan Ewing (Roche, Gryba)
( 30 saves / 32 shots ) Cory Schneider		Goalie stats	John Curry ( 17 saves / 21 shots ) / Karson Gillespie ( 9 saves / 11 shots )

=== Championship ===
==== (1) New Hampshire vs. (2) Boston College ====
March 17	New Hampshire	2 – 5	Boston College	TD Banknorth Garden	Recap
No Scoring		First period	10:45 - Matt Greene (Brennan); 17:53 - Benn Ferriero (Rooney)
No scoring		Second period	18:38 - GW - Brock Bradford (Gerbe)
Bobby Butler - 09:07 (Pollastrone, Fornataro) Trevor Smith - 11:33		Third period	06:14 - Nathan Gerbe (Boyle); 19:42 - EN - Brian Boyle (Ferriero, Rooney)
( 29 saves / 33 shots ) Kevin Regan		Goalie stats	Cory Schneider ( 36 saves / 38 shots )

== Tournament awards ==
=== All-Tournament Team ===
- F Brock Bradford* (Boston College)
- F Chris Capraro (Massachusetts)
- F Benn Ferriero (Boston College)
- D Brian Boyle (Boston College)
- D Chris Murray (New Hampshire)
- G Cory Schneider (Boston College)

* Tournament MVP(s)
