= Cory Schneider =

American ice hockey player (born 1986)

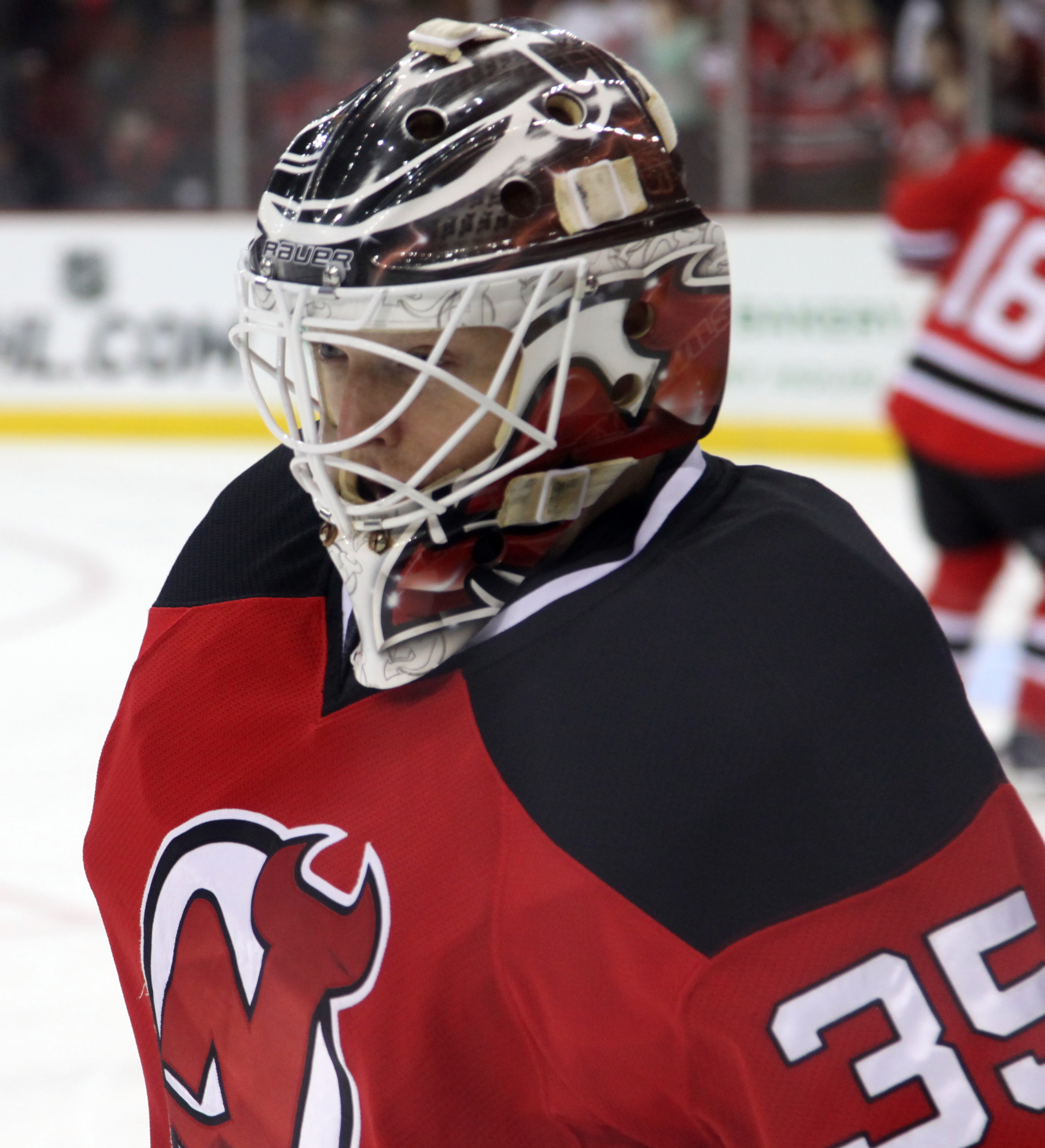
- Schneider with the New Jersey Devils in April 2014
- Born: March 18, 1986 (age 40) Marblehead, Massachusetts, U.S.
- Height: 6 ft 3 in (191 cm)
- Weight: 214 lb (97 kg; 15 st 4 lb)
- Position: Goaltender
- Caught: Left
- Played for: Vancouver Canucks; HC Ambrì-Piotta; New Jersey Devils; New York Islanders
- National team: United States
- NHL draft: 26th overall, 2004; Vancouver Canucks
- Playing career: 2007–2023

Cory Franklin Schneider (born March 18, 1986) is an American former professional ice hockey player. A goaltender, he played for the Vancouver Canucks, New Jersey Devils and New York Islanders of the National Hockey League (NHL).

Schneider was selected in the first round, 26th overall, by the Vancouver Canucks in the 2004 NHL entry draft. Following his draft, he began a three-year tenure with the Boston College Eagles, winning two Lamoriello Trophies as Hockey East champions and making two NCAA Final appearances during his college career. Schneider turned professional with Vancouver's American Hockey League (AHL) affiliate, the Manitoba Moose, in 2007 and was named the league's Goaltender of the Year following his second season. After three seasons with the Moose, he became the Canucks' full-time backup in 2010–11. In his first full season with the Canucks, he won the William M. Jennings Trophy with Roberto Luongo for establishing the best team goals against average (GAA) in the NHL. The following campaign, he set Canucks records for best GAA and save percentage in a single season with 1.96 and .937 marks, respectively.

At the 2013 NHL entry draft, Schneider was traded to the New Jersey Devils for the ninth overall selection. With the exception of the 2017–18 season, the Devils were never a successful team during Schneider's seven-year tenure, despite several strong seasons from Schneider. When the Devils qualified for the playoffs in 2017–18, Schneider's performance had already begun to dramatically decline. The team bought out the remainder of his contract in 2020.

Internationally, Schneider has represented the United States at various junior levels. Early in his career, he won gold and silver medals at the 2003 U-18 Junior World Cup and 2004 IIHF World U18 Championships, respectively. He later competed in the 2005 and 2006 World Junior Championships, finishing in fourth with the United States each time. Due to his Swiss ancestry, Schneider also holds a Swiss citizenship.

== Early life ==
Schneider was born to Susan and Richard Schneider in Marblehead, Massachusetts, a suburb of Boston. Schneider started training with his goalie coach, Brian Daccord, at age 15; Daccord now owns Stop It Goaltending, a company of which currently Schneider owns a small percentage. He began playing hockey around the age of six, trying out for the same team as his older brother, Geoff. He did not become a regular goaltender until the age of 11, as the Marblehead Youth Hockey teams he played with at earlier ages rotated the position. Growing up, Schneider looked up to Mike Richter of the New York Rangers for being a successful American goaltender. Paying homage to Richter, he chose to wear the jersey number 35.

Schneider earned his secondary education at Marblehead High School in his hometown and Phillips Academy, a prep school in Andover, Massachusetts, where he graduated. In addition to hockey, he was also a varsity baseball player for two years during his time at Phillips Academy. While excelling in sports, Schneider also maintained proficiency in academics. Following his senior year, he received the school's Yale Bowl and the Boston Bruins' John Carlton Memorial Trophy, both for achievement in scholarship and athletics. While enrolled at Boston College, Schneider majored in finance in the institution's Carroll School of Management. He continued to be recognized for academic achievement, being named to two Hockey East All-Academic Teams and earning Paul Patrick Daley Student-Athlete Scholarship in 2006.

He is a member of his hometown Friends of Marblehead Hockey Hall of Fame. Inducted on August 18, 2008, he is the only born-and-raised native to be drafted into the NHL.

Due to his father's ancestry, he holds both American and Swiss citizenship.

== Playing career ==
=== High school and USNTDP (2000–2004) ===
Schneider played with Marblehead High School in his freshman year before moving to Phillips Academy because of their more prestigious hockey team. In his senior year with the school, he was named the team captain. He posted 17 wins and 4 losses with a .960 save percentage, while leading Phillips Academy to the New England Prep School semifinals. Schneider was a two-time All-New England selection in his high school career with Phillips Academy. During his senior year, Schneider also joined the United States National Team Development Program. He appeared in 10 games with the under-18 club and two games in North American Hockey League play.

Going into the 2004 NHL entry draft, Schneider was the second-ranked American goaltender behind Al Montoya and seventh North American goaltender overall by the NHL Central Scouting Bureau. He was selected in the first round, 26th overall, by the Vancouver Canucks on June 26, 2004.

=== Boston College (2004–2007) ===
With the option of joining the major junior ranks in Canada or staying in the United States to play college hockey, Schneider prioritized getting an education and committed to the Boston College Eagles. He had also considered Harvard and Cornell. Boston College head coach Jerry York had considered delaying Schneider's debut for another season and have him play Junior A in the United States Hockey League. However, when forward Adam Pineault left Boston College to play in the Quebec Major Junior Hockey League, a scholarship was made available and York decided to keep Schneider on the roster.

Schneider made 23 saves in his college debut, a 3–2 win against the University of Massachusetts Lowell River Hawks. He was then chosen as the Hockey East Defensive Player of the Week on October 19, 2004. He later notched his first college shutout against the Yale Bulldogs on January 11, 2005. The following month, he was sidelined for three weeks after tearing the medial collateral ligament of his left knee during a game against the Harvard Crimson on February 14, 2005. Splitting the goaltending duties with senior Matti Kaltiainen, he appeared in 18 games with a 1.90 goals against average (GAA) and a .916 save percentage while finishing with a record of 13 wins, 1 loss and 4 ties. He was named to the Hockey East All-Rookie Team and received Boston College's Bernie Burke Outstanding Freshman Award.

By the playoffs, York made Schneider his starting goaltender over Kaltiainen. He went on to backstop Boston College to a record-setting sixth Lamoriello Trophy in team history as Hockey East champions. He made 39 saves in a double-overtime semifinal win against the Maine Black Bears, before a 26-save performance in Boston's 3–1 final win against the New Hampshire Wildcats. He gained Hockey East Rookie of the Week accolades on March 21, 2005, for his semifinal and final wins and was named to the All-Tournament Team for his efforts. Advancing to the 2005 NCAA Tournament, Boston College lost their regional final by a 6–3 score to the North Dakota Fighting Sioux.

In Schneider's sophomore season, he posted a college career-high .929 save percentage and two team records of eight shutouts and 1,088 saves. He posted 242:19 consecutive shutout minutes in the month of January, not allowing a goal for more than 11 periods. His streak was broken on January 27, 2006, in a game against Boston University. His 1.96 GAA was first among goaltenders in conference play, earning him the Hockey East Goaltending Award (his overall GAA including inter-conference play was 2.11). He was named to the Hockey East Second All-Conference Team and was a co-recipient with teammate Chris Collins for both the Hockey East Three Stars Award and Boston College MVP. At the 2006 Beanpot, he received the Eberly Trophy as the tournament's best goaltender with a .924 save percentage. His 24 wins in 39 regular season appearances helped Boston College to a successful regular season. In the playoffs, they failed to defend their Hockey East championship, losing to the Boston University Terriers in the final. Qualifying for the 2006 NCAA Tournament, Boston College met Boston University again in the regional final. Shutting the Terriers out to advance to the Frozen Four, Schneider was named the Northeastern Regional Tournament MVP. Boston College then defeated North Dakota in the semifinal before losing the national championship to the Wisconsin Badgers 2–1.

In his third season with Boston College, Schneider recorded a college career-high 29 wins in 42 games, along with a 2.15 GAA and .925 save percentage. He led the Eagles to their second Lamoirello Trophy in three years, defeating New Hampshire by a 5–2 score in the final. He made his second consecutive appearance in the NCAA final, but lost to the Michigan State Spartans. Following his third college season, Schneider chose to forgo his senior year to turn professional. He left Boston College with a career record of 65 wins, 25 losses and 7 ties in 97 games, as well as a college career mark of 15 shutouts.

=== Vancouver Canucks (2008–2013) ===
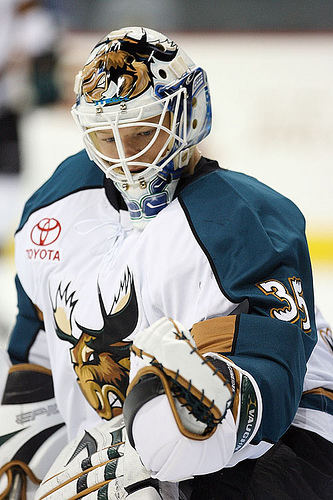
Schneider in 2009

Schneider signed an entry-level contract with the Vancouver Canucks on July 3, 2007. He was regarded as the Canucks' third-string goalie behind Roberto Luongo and the newly acquired backup Curtis Sanford. Following his first NHL training camp, he was assigned to the Canucks' minor league affiliate, the Manitoba Moose of the American Hockey League (AHL). After a shaky start to the 2007–08 season (3–7–0 record, 3.69 GAA and .872 save percentage in 11 games), he was privately called out by head coach Scott Arniel in mid-December after being pulled the previous game. In recalling the meeting, Schneider has commented that "[Arniel] was one of the first guys to...tell me I wasn't good enough, something that I hadn't really heard a lot growing up. Sometimes it's something you need to hear." From that point on, he emerged as Manitoba's starting goalie over fellow Canucks prospect Drew MacIntyre, and was named the AHL Rookie of the Month for March. He finished the season with a 21–12–2 record, 2.28 GAA and .916 save percentage. Although the Moose were eliminated in the first round by the Syracuse Crunch, Schneider had an impressive playoffs, recording a 1.92 GAA and .938 save percentage over six games.

Going into training camp for the 2008–09 season, Schneider was expected to compete for the Canucks' backup position with Sanford, who had been re-signed in the off-season. He was assigned to the Moose for a second consecutive season where he continued as the minor league team's starting goalie. He received his first NHL call-up from Manitoba on November 22, 2008, following an injury to Luongo. At the time of his call-up, he was leading the AHL in both wins and GAA in addition to establishing a team record with 10 straight wins. After sitting on the bench as Sanford's backup for two games, Schneider made his first NHL appearance and start on November 29 against the Calgary Flames, making 28 saves in a 3–1 loss. He subsequently recorded his first NHL win in a 16-save, 2–1 victory against the Minnesota Wild on December 5. After appearing in eight games for the Canucks, goaltender Jason LaBarbera was acquired in a trade from the Los Angeles Kings and Schneider was sent back to the Moose on January 5, 2009. During his time in Vancouver, Schneider had been named AHL Goalie of the Month for November. Upon returning to Manitoba, he extended his record-setting win streak to 13 games. He was also chosen as the starting goalie for PlanetUSA for the 2009 AHL All-Star Classic. He was named Top Goaltender in the Skills Competition, then helped PlanetUSA to a 15–11 win over the Canadian All-Stars. Near the end of the season, he was chosen as AHL Player of the Week on March 30, 2009, after allowing five goals in three starts. He completed the campaign with team records of 28 wins, 2.04 GAA and .928 save percentage. Additionally the league-leader in GAA and save percentage, Schneider was awarded the Aldege "Baz" Bastien Memorial Award as AHL goaltender of the year. He also received the Harry "Hap" Holmes Memorial Award as the goaltender on the team with the lowest goals against. His award-winning campaign helped the Moose to the best regular season record in the league. In the proceeding 2009 playoffs, Schneider backstopped the Moose to the Calder Cup Finals, losing the championship in six games to the Hershey Bears. He finished the playoffs with a 2.15 GAA and .922 save percentage in 22 games.

In September 2009, Vancouver re-signed Luongo to a 12-year extension. As such, it was widely speculated that Schneider would inevitably be traded. Despite his success in the AHL, his chances of competing for a starting position with the Canucks were seen as unlikely by the media due to Luongo's prominence on the team. Regardless, he publicly maintained he was unfazed by his position on the Canucks' depth chart and that he was focused on competing with the newly acquired Andrew Raycroft for the Canucks' backup position in 2009–10. Schneider was, however, sent back to the Moose out of training camp. Less than a month into the season, Schneider received his second NHL call-up with the Canucks to back up Raycroft after Luongo was sidelined with a rib fracture on October 28, 2009. He remained with the Canucks for nearly two weeks, earning one start against the Dallas Stars on November 6, stopping 45 shots in a 2–1 loss. He was returned to the Moose on November 10. Despite being the reigning goaltender of the year in the AHL and having a comparable season in 2009–10, Schneider was not named to PlanetUSA for the 2010 AHL All-Star Game. The non-selection drew public criticism from Moose head coach Arniel. Amidst a mediocre season as a team, Schneider posted a 2.51 GAA and .919 save percentage and topped his previous team record of wins in a season with 35 in 60 games. During the campaign, he also surpassed Alex Auld on the franchise's all-time wins and games played list, finishing with 84 and 136, respectively. Manitoba qualified for the 2010 playoffs with the final and eighth seed in the Western Conference. Matching up against the Hamilton Bulldogs in the opening round, they were eliminated in six games. Schneider recorded a 3.12 GAA and .905 save percentage in the losing effort.

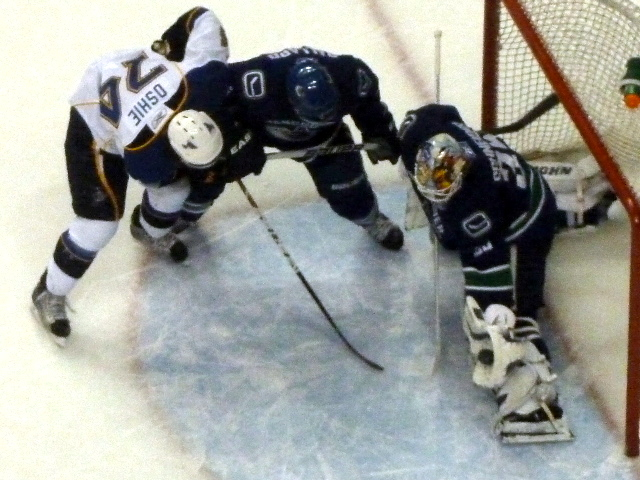
Schneider as a Canuck in February 2011 making a glove save with T. J. Oshie at the crease with teammate Keith Ballard defending.

On June 2, 2010, Schneider signed a two-year, $1.8 million contract extension with the Vancouver Canucks. Assistant general manager Laurence Gilman asserted that the new deal should establish himself as Luongo's backup and garner more exposure to potentially facilitate a trade to another NHL team. He made his first start of the 2010–11 season on October 18, 2010, against the Carolina Hurricanes. He stopped 32 shots in a 5–1 win, marking his first NHL victory since December 14, 2008. Later in the season, he recorded his first NHL shutout, stopping 26 shots in a 3–0 win against the Anaheim Ducks on March 6, 2011. Nearing the end of the regular season, the Canucks were leading the league in team GAA, putting Luongo and Schneider in contention for the William M. Jennings Trophy. However, with a week remaining in the regular season, Schneider was two appearances short of the 25-game minimum to qualify for the Jennings (had he not reached the requirement, Luongo would have been awarded the trophy by himself). While head coach Alain Vigneault initially dismissed the notion of playing Schneider for the sole purpose of sharing the award with Luongo, he sent Schneider in relief of Luongo with 28 seconds remaining in the third-last game of the season, a 2–0 loss to the Edmonton Oilers for Schneider's 24th appearance. Two games later – the Canucks' last contest of the regular season – Schneider was given the start against the Calgary Flames. Needing to allow seven goals or fewer to secure the Jennings, he helped Vancouver to a 3–2 overtime win. It marked the first time in the trophy's history that it was awarded to Canucks goaltenders. Luongo and Schneider's combined GAA of 2.20 was 0.10 better than the Boston Bruins' second-place goaltending tandem of Tim Thomas and Tuukka Rask. Schneider completed his NHL rookie season with a 2.23 GAA and .929 save percentage in 25 games (22 starts), as well as a 16-4-2 record. His GAA tied for fourth in the league, while his save percentage ranked third and set a single-season Canucks record. Schneider made his NHL playoff debut in Game 4 of the opening round against the Chicago Blackhawks. With the Canucks down 6–1, Luongo was pulled in favour of Schneider in the third period. Schneider allowed one goal on seven shots, as the Blackhawks went on to win the game 7–2. After Luongo was pulled again in Game 5, Schneider was chosen to start for Game 6. Schneider allowed three goals on 20 shots; he left the game in the third period after suffering cramps during a failed attempt to stop a penalty shot from Blackhawks' forward Michael Frolík. The Canucks went on to lose the contest 4–3 in overtime, but won the following Game 7 with Luongo in net to advance to the second round. The Canucks would advance to the Stanley Cup Finals against the Boston Bruins. Schneider made an appearance in Game 4 stopping all shots he faced as the team would lose the game 4–0. He also appeared in Game 6, replacing Luongo in the first period after he gave up three goals on eight shots. Schneider allowed two goals in relief for the remainder of the game as the Canucks went on to lose the contest 5–2 to force a Game 7. With Schneider on the bench, Vancouver then lost Game 7 at home 4–0 for a 4–3 loss in the series, surrendering a 3–2 series lead in the process.

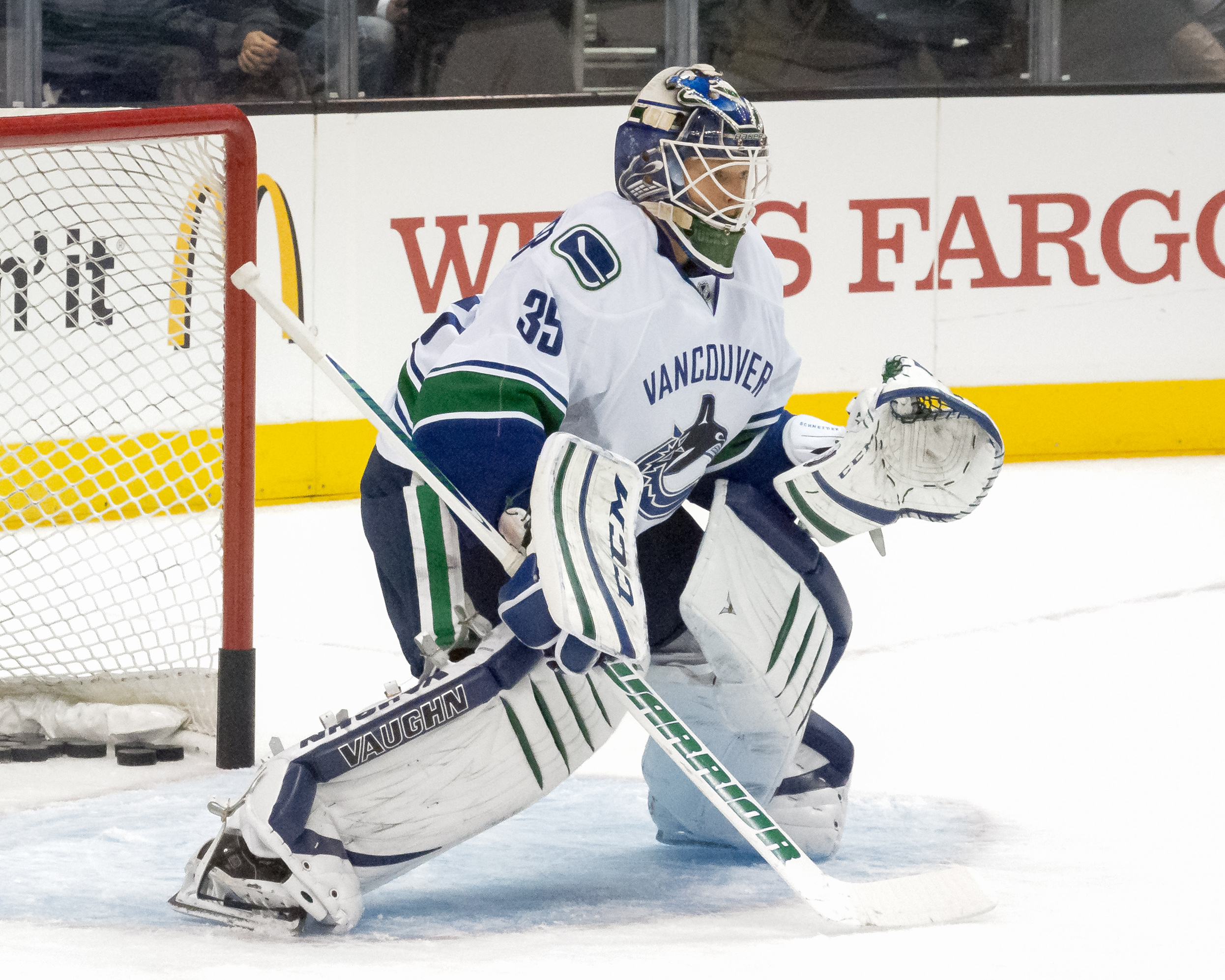
Schneider with the Vancouver Canucks in January 2013

Remaining as Luongo's backup for the start of the 2011–12 season, Schneider's playing time was expanded when Luongo suffered an injury in mid-November 2011. Despite Luongo's return to the lineup after missing two games, Schneider continued to earn starts due to his stellar performance. On November 28, he was named the NHL's Second Star of the Week after recording three wins in as many contests, a span that included back-to-back shutouts (on November 23 against the Colorado Avalanche and November 25 against the Phoenix Coyotes). Schneider finished his second full NHL season with improved numbers. Of the 33 games he played, he started 28 and compiled 20 wins and nine losses. His 1.96 GAA and .937 save percentage over 33 games ranked third and second in the NHL, respectively, while also setting Canucks team records. His GAA topped the 2.11 mark Luongo had set in 2010–11, while his save percentage bettered the .929 he had achieved, also in the previous season. The latter team record also ranked as the fourth-best ever recorded in the NHL. During the 2012 playoffs, Schneider supplanted Luongo as the team's playoff goalie. After Vancouver lost their first two games against the eighth-seeded Los Angeles Kings 4–2 in the opening round, Vigneault started Schneider. Despite losing game three 1–0 for a 3–0 series deficit, Schneider started for the remainder of the series, which Los Angeles won four-games-to-one. In the three games he played, he recorded a 1.31 GAA and .960 save percentage. Vigneault's decision led many in the media to believe that Schneider would retain the role the following season, while Luongo would be traded. Although Luongo's contract included a no-trade clause, he told reporters following the Canucks' defeat to the Kings that he would waive it if the team asked him to. During the off season, Schneider and the Canucks agreed to a three-year, $12 million contract.

During the 2012–13 NHL lockout, Schneider played with Swiss team HC Ambrì-Piotta of National League A. He played in eight games and recorded a .914 save percentage. Returning to Vancouver as NHL play resumed, Schneider appeared in 30 games for the Canucks and posted a 17–9–4 record and was one of five goaltenders to tie for the NHL lead with five shutouts. He appeared in two playoff games, both losses, as the Canucks were swept out of the first round by the San Jose Sharks.

=== New Jersey Devils (2013–2020) ===
The Canucks spent a full year attempting to trade Luongo and his contract before conceding no team was willing to meet their demands. Instead, they agreed to trade Schneider to the New Jersey Devils. The deal, completed on June 30, 2013 at the 2013 NHL entry draft, saw the ninth overall selection, which was used to select future Canucks' captain Bo Horvat, sent to Vancouver. Schneider described the trade as "shocking", adding that after several seasons of expecting to be traded, he had finally begun to believe he would stay in Vancouver. He played his first game against the Pittsburgh Penguins, a 3–0 loss. Schneider split goaltending duties with veteran Martin Brodeur during the 2013–14 season, with Schneider earning extra starts due to his performance.

On July 9, 2014, Schneider signed a seven-year, $42 million contract extension with the Devils. Brodeur opted not to re-sign with New Jersey, leaving Schneider as the Devils' starting goaltender. In 2014–15, Schneider posted a .925 save percentage (the sixth best in the NHL) and a 2.26 GAA. Despite Schneider's success, the Devils missed the playoffs for the third consecutive season. The team won only one of their final 11 games of the season.

Schneider continued to put up elite numbers for the Devils in the 2015–16 season, including a 2.15 GAA and a .924 save percentage. The Devils missed the playoffs for a fourth consecutive season.

In the 2016–17 season, Schneider put up a .908 save percentage, had a GAA of 2.82, and finished the season with 2 shutouts and a 20–27–11 record. The Devils finished last in the Eastern Conference and missed the playoffs for the fifth consecutive season by 25 points.

The Devils' fortunes finally started to turn around in the 2017–18 season, with the team putting up their best start in franchise history, going 9–2–0 in their first 11 games. They also successfully returned to the Stanley Cup playoffs. Despite performing well in the first half, a groin injury during a game on January 23 sidelined Schneider, backup Keith Kinkaid played well down the stretch and as Schneider struggled to regain his form, Kinkaid was in goal when the Devils 2018 playoff campaign began against the Tampa Bay Lightning. However, after Kinkaid posted a 5.87 GAA and a save percentage of .804, Schneider replaced Kinkaid late into Game 2 and started Games 3, 4 and 5. This also marked Schneider's first playoff appearance since 2013, and the first overall with the Devils. Here Schneider again posted elite numbers with a 1.78 GAA and a .950 save percentage. However, the Devils would lose the series to the top-seeded Lightning in five games.

During the off-season, Schneider underwent hip surgery to repair torn cartilage which forced him to miss the opening of the 2018–19 season. He returned to the Devils lineup on October 29, 2018. The 2018–19 season was eventful as Schneider registered his first win since December 27, 2017.

On November 18, 2019, as a result of Schneider's struggling performance in the season, he was placed on waivers for the purpose of assigning him to New Jersey's AHL affiliate, the Binghamton Devils. He cleared waivers the next day and was assigned to the Binghamton Devils. On October 8, 2020, after seven seasons with the Devils organization it was announced that Schneider was placed on unconditional waivers for the purpose of buying out the remaining two years of his contract with the club.

=== New York Islanders (2021–2023) ===
On January 14, 2021, Schneider was signed to a reported one-year, $700,000 contract with the New York Islanders. On September 21, 2021, Schneider was re-signed by the Islanders. On September 21, 2022, he was re-signed to a one-year contract by the Islanders.

Schneider announced his retirement on September 26, 2023, after spending the 2022–23 season with New York's AHL affiliate, the Bridgeport Islanders.

== International play ==
Medal record

Representing United States

Ice hockey

IIHF World U18 Championship
Silver medal – second place	2004 Belarus	

U18 Junior World Cup
Gold medal – first place	2003 Slovakia	

Schneider competed for the United States at the 2003 U-18 Junior World Cup, held in Břeclav, Czech Republic, and Piešťany, Slovakia. He helped the club go undefeated in five games, en route to the country's first gold medal in the history of the tournament. Sharing goaltending duties with Ian Keserich over the course of the tournament, Schneider was given the start for the gold medal game against Russia, turning aside 32 shots for the 3–2 win.

Schneider next appeared for the United States at the 2004 IIHF World U18 Championships in Minsk, Belarus. He recorded the third-best GAA (1.71) and second-best save percentage (.929) of the tournament en route to a silver medal. The United States were defeated in the gold medal game by Russia 3–2. He was later named the David Peterson Goalie of the Year by USA Hockey, having led them to two medals in the 2003–04 season.

In August 2004, Schneider participated in the U.S. National Junior Team Evaluation Camp in Grand Forks, North Dakota. Several months later, he debuted at the under-20 level at the 2005 World Junior Championships, hosted by the United States in Grand Forks and Thief River Falls, Minnesota. Playing backup to Al Montoya, he was given the start for a preliminary game against Belarus. After just over a period of play, he was pulled for allowing three goals on eight shots. The United States lost the game 5–3 in Schneider's only tournament appearance. After losing to Russia 7–2 in the semifinal, the United States lost the bronze medal game 3–2 to the Czech Republic in overtime.

After attending the U.S.'s summer evaluation camp for a second straight year in Lake Placid, New York, Schneider was given the starting position for the 2006 World Junior Championships in British Columbia, Canada. He was named the United States' player of the game in their third match of the preliminary round, a 2–2 tie against Switzerland; Schneider made 22 saves. He earned his second player of the game selection in the quarterfinal, stopping 30 shots in a 2–1 win against the Czech Republic. The United States were then eliminated in the semifinal by Russia before losing the bronze medal game to Finland. He appeared in six games total with a 2.67 GAA and .912 save percentage, fifth among tournament goaltenders.

Schneider's first experience with the men's senior team came in 2007 when he was among the first eighteen players named to the United States' team for the 2007 IIHF World Championship in Russia. Despite being named to the team, Schneider did not play in any games, instead serving as the team's third goaltender behind John Grahame and Jason Bacashihua.

On April 19, 2019, Schneider was selected to represent Team USA at the 2019 IIHF World Championship, held in Bratislava and Kosice, Slovakia.

== Playing style ==
Schneider plays in the butterfly style of goaltending, dropping to his knees with his skates pointing outwards and his pads meeting in the middle in order to cover the bottom portion of the net. He honed the style with goaltending consultant Brian Daccord, beginning at the age of 15. After joining the Canucks as a backup full-time in 2010–11, Schneider began working with the team goaltending coach Roland Melanson, who encouraged him to play shallower in his crease. Schneider adopted the style which required him to be more athletic on first shots, but better prepared him for rebounds and cross-crease plays. Schneider's strengths are his size and athleticism. His coach with the Moose, Scott Arniel, has also heralded his ability to get into position ahead of time, anticipating plays.

== Personal life ==
Schneider and his wife Jill have a son and a daughter. The family resides in Fairfield, Connecticut.

== Career statistics ==
=== Regular season and playoffs ===
			Regular season										Playoffs
Season	Team	League	GP	W	L	T	OTL	MIN	GA	SO	GAA	SV%	GP	W	L	MIN	GA	SO	GAA	SV%
2002–03	Phillips Academy	NEPSAC	23	13	7	2	—	1,385	39	3	1.69	.951	—	—	—	—	—	—	—	—
2003–04	Phillips Academy	NEPSAC	24	17	5	2	—	1,336	32	6	1.42	.956	—	—	—	—	—	—	—	—
2003–04	U.S. NTDP	U-18	10	9	1	0	—	559	15	1	1.61	—	—	—	—	—	—	—	—	—
2003–04	U.S. NTDP	NAHL	2	2	0	0	—	120	6	0	3.00	—	—	—	—	—	—	—	—	—
2004–05	Boston College	HE	18	13	1	4	—	1,102	35	1	1.90	.916	—	—	—	—	—	—	—	—
2005–06	Boston College	HE	39	24	13	2	—	2,361	83	8	2.11	.929	—	—	—	—	—	—	—	—
2006–07	Boston College	HE	42	29	12	1	—	2,516	90	6	2.15	.925	—	—	—	—	—	—	—	—
2007–08	Manitoba Moose	AHL	36	21	12	—	2	2,054	78	3	2.28	.916	6	1	4	375	12	0	1.92	.938
2008–09	Manitoba Moose	AHL	40	28	10	—	1	2,324	79	5	2.04	.928	22	14	7	1315	47	0	2.15	.922
2008–09	Vancouver Canucks	NHL	8	2	4	—	1	355	20	0	3.38	.877	—	—	—	—	—	—	—	—
2009–10	Manitoba Moose	AHL	60	35	23	—	2	3,557	149	4	2.51	.919	6	2	4	366	19	0	3.12	.905
2009–10	Vancouver Canucks	NHL	2	0	1	—	0	79	5	0	3.80	.915	—	—	—	—	—	—	—	—
2010–11	Vancouver Canucks	NHL	25	16	4	—	2	1,372	51	1	2.23	.929	5	0	0	163	7	0	2.58	.915
2011–12	Vancouver Canucks	NHL	33	20	8	—	1	1,833	60	3	1.96	.937	3	1	2	183	4	0	1.31	.960
2012–13	Ambrì-Piotta	NLA	8	4	4	—	0	485	26	0	3.22	.913	—	—	—	—	—	—	—	—
2012–13	Vancouver Canucks	NHL	30	17	9	—	4	1,733	61	5	2.11	.927	2	0	2	117	9	0	4.62	.880
2013–14	New Jersey Devils	NHL	46	16	15	—	12	2,680	88	3	1.97	.921	—	—	—	—	—	—	—	—
2014–15	New Jersey Devils	NHL	69	26	31	—	9	3,924	148	5	2.26	.925	—	—	—	—	—	—	—	—
2015–16	New Jersey Devils	NHL	58	27	25	—	6	3,413	122	4	2.15	.924	—	—	—	—	—	—	—	—
2016–17	New Jersey Devils	NHL	60	20	27	—	11	3,473	163	2	2.82	.908	—	—	—	—	—	—	—	—
2017–18	New Jersey Devils	NHL	40	17	16	—	6	2,333	114	1	2.93	.907	4	1	2	202	6	0	1.78	.950
2017–18	Binghamton Devils	AHL	1	1	0	—	0	60	1	0	1.00	.950	—	—	—	—	—	—	—	—
2018–19	New Jersey Devils	NHL	26	6	13	—	4	1,372	70	1	3.06	.903	—	—	—	—	—	—	—	—
2018–19	Binghamton Devils	AHL	8	2	4	—	2	482	26	0	3.24	.881	—	—	—	—	—	—	—	—
2019–20	New Jersey Devils	NHL	13	3	6	—	2	680	40	1	3.53	.887	—	—	—	—	—	—	—	—
2019–20	Binghamton Devils	AHL	14	7	7	—	0	818	37	0	2.71	.903	—	—	—	—	—	—	—	—
2020–21	Bridgeport Sound Tigers	AHL	2	0	1	—	1	122	8	0	3.94	.843	—	—	—	—	—	—	—	—
2021–22	Bridgeport Islanders	AHL	30	14	11	—	4	1,725	78	1	2.71	.921	6	3	2	332	13	0	2.35	.927
2021–22	New York Islanders	NHL	1	1	0	—	0	60	3	0	3.00	.900	—	—	—	—	—	—	—	—
2022–23	Bridgeport Islanders	AHL	33	19	11	—	3	1919	94	1	2.94	.913	—	—	—	—	—	—	—	—
NHL totals			410	171	159	—	58	23,305	945	26	2.43	.918	14	2	6	665	26	0	2.35	.931

=== International ===
Year	Team	Event	GP	W	L	T	MIN	GA	SO	GAA	SV%
2003	United States	IH18	—	—	—	—	—	—	—	—	—
2004	United States	U18	6	5	1	0	350	10	0	1.71	.929
2005	United States	WJC	1	0	1	0	22	3	0	7.94	.625
2006	United States	WJC	6	2	3	1	359	16	0	2.67	.912
2016	United States	WCH	1	0	0	0	18	0	0	0.00	1.000
2019	United States	WC	6	3	3	0	362	15	0	2.49	.920
Junior totals			13	7	5	1	731	29	0	2.37	.912
Senior totals			7	3	3	0	380	15	0	2.36	.926

== Awards and achievements ==
=== High school ===
Award	Year
John Carlton Memorial Trophy (athletic and academic achievement, Massachusetts high school senior; awarded by the Boston Bruins)	2004

=== College ===
Award	Year
All-Hockey East Rookie Team	2005
Bernie Burke Outstanding Freshman Award (Boston College)	2005
Hockey East All-Tournament Team	2005, 2006, 2007
Eberly Trophy (Beanpot's best goalie)	2006
AHCA East First-Team All-American	2006
HE Goaltending Award (lowest GAA in league play)	2006
All-Hockey East Second Team	2006
Norman F. Dailey Memorial Award (Boston College MVP)	2006 (co-winner with Chris Collins)
NCAA Northeast Regional Tournament MVP	2006

=== AHL ===
Award	Year
AHL All-Star Game	2009
Aldege "Baz" Bastien Memorial Award	2009
Harry "Hap" Holmes Memorial Award	2009

=== International ===
Award	Year
U18 Junior World Cup gold medal	2003
IIHF U18 silver medal	2004
Dave Peterson Goalie of the Year	2004

=== NHL ===
Award	Year
William M. Jennings Trophy (shared with Roberto Luongo)	2011
NHL All-Star Game	2016

== Records ==
=== Boston College ===
- Single-season shutouts: 8 (2005–06)
- Single-season saves: 1,088 (2005–06)
- All-time shutouts: 15 (2004–2007)

=== Manitoba Moose ===
- Consecutive wins: 13 (2008–09)
- Single-season GAA: 2.04 (2008–09)
- Single-season save percentage: .928 (2008–09)
- Single-season wins: 35 (2009–10)
- Career wins: 84 (2007–10)
- Career games played: 136 (2007–2010)

Awards and achievements
Preceded by Patrick Eaves / Ryan Shannon	Hockey East Three-Stars Award; 2005–06; With: Chris Collins	Succeeded by John Curry
Preceded by Matti Kaltiainen	Hockey East Goaltending Champion; 2005–06	Succeeded by John Curry
Preceded by Michael Leighton	Aldege "Baz" Bastien Memorial Award; 2009	Succeeded by Jonathan Bernier
Preceded by Nolan Schaefer / Barry Brust	Harry "Hap" Holmes Memorial Award; 2009	Succeeded by Cedrick Desjardins / Curtis Sanford
Preceded by Martin Brodeur	William M. Jennings Trophy; 2011; With: Roberto Luongo	Succeeded by Brian Elliott / Jaroslav Halák
Preceded by Ryan Kesler	Vancouver Canucks first-round draft pick 2004	Succeeded by Luc Bourdon
