= Chris Murray (ice hockey, born 1984) =

American ice hockey player

- Born: December 26, 1984 (age 41) Dover, Massachusetts, USA
- Height: 6 ft 2 in (188 cm)
- Weight: 185 lb (84 kg; 13 st 3 lb)
- Position: Defense
- Shot: Right
- Played for: Peoria Rivermen; Lake Erie Monsters; Springfield Falcons; Albany River Rats; Hartford Wolf Pack; Lowell Devils; Charlotte Checkers; Nottingham Panthers; Bietigheim Steelers; HC Milano Rossoblu
- NHL draft: Undrafted
- Playing career: 2007–2015

Chris Murray (born December 26, 1984) is an American former professional ice hockey defenseman.

== Playing career ==
In 2011, Murray signed for the Charlotte Checkers in the American Hockey League after two seasons within the New Jersey Devils minor league affiliate's. In the end of the 2011–12 season with the Checkers, Murray was injured and was forced to sit out the following season in recovery. On July 18, 2013, Murray marked his return by signing a one-year contract with English club, the Nottingham Panthers of the Elite Ice Hockey League. Midway through the season, Murray moved to the German second-tier league with Bietigheim Steelers in the German DEL2.

== Career statistics ==
			Regular season					Playoffs
Season	Team	League	GP	G	A	Pts	PIM	GP	G	A	Pts	PIM
2003–04	University of New Hampshire	HE	2	0	0	0	2	—	—	—	—	—
2004–05	University of New Hampshire	HE	34	0	5	5	44	—	—	—	—	—
2005–06	University of New Hampshire	HE	37	2	6	8	61	—	—	—	—	—
2006–07	University of New Hampshire	HE	39	9	13	22	84	—	—	—	—	—
2006–07	Peoria Rivermen	AHL	1	0	0	0	0	—	—	—	—	—
2007–08	Phoenix RoadRunners	ECHL	45	1	13	14	122	—	—	—	—	—
2007–08	Lake Erie Monsters	AHL	1	0	0	0	2	—	—	—	—	—
2007–08	Springfield Falcons	AHL	2	0	0	0	0	—	—	—	—	—
2007–08	Albany River Rats	AHL	13	1	3	4	15	—	—	—	—	—
2008–09	Hartford Wolf Pack	AHL	13	0	3	3	21	—	—	—	—	—
2008–09	Charlotte Checkers	ECHL	53	2	13	15	124	4	0	1	1	8
2009–10	Trenton Devils	ECHL	28	0	9	9	87	—	—	—	—	—
2009–10	Lowell Devils	AHL	18	1	1	2	27	—	—	—	—	—
2010–11	Albany Devils	AHL	52	1	7	8	118	—	—	—	—	—
2011–12	Florida Everblades	ECHL	27	3	11	14	53	—	—	—	—	—
2011–12	Charlotte Checkers	AHL	14	1	1	2	21	—	—	—	—	—
2013–14	Nottingham Panthers	EIHL	39	8	32	40	117	—	—	—	—	—
2013–14	Bietigheim Steelers	DEL2	6	0	1	1	22	—	—	—	—	—
2014–15	HC Milano Rossoblu	ITL	34	0	14	14	86	9	2	4	6	18
AHL totals			114	4	15	19	204	—	—	—	—	—

== Awards and honors ==
Award	Year
All-Hockey East Second Team	2006–07
Hockey East All-Tournament Team	2007
