= Torrey Mitchell =

Canadian ice hockey player (born 1985)

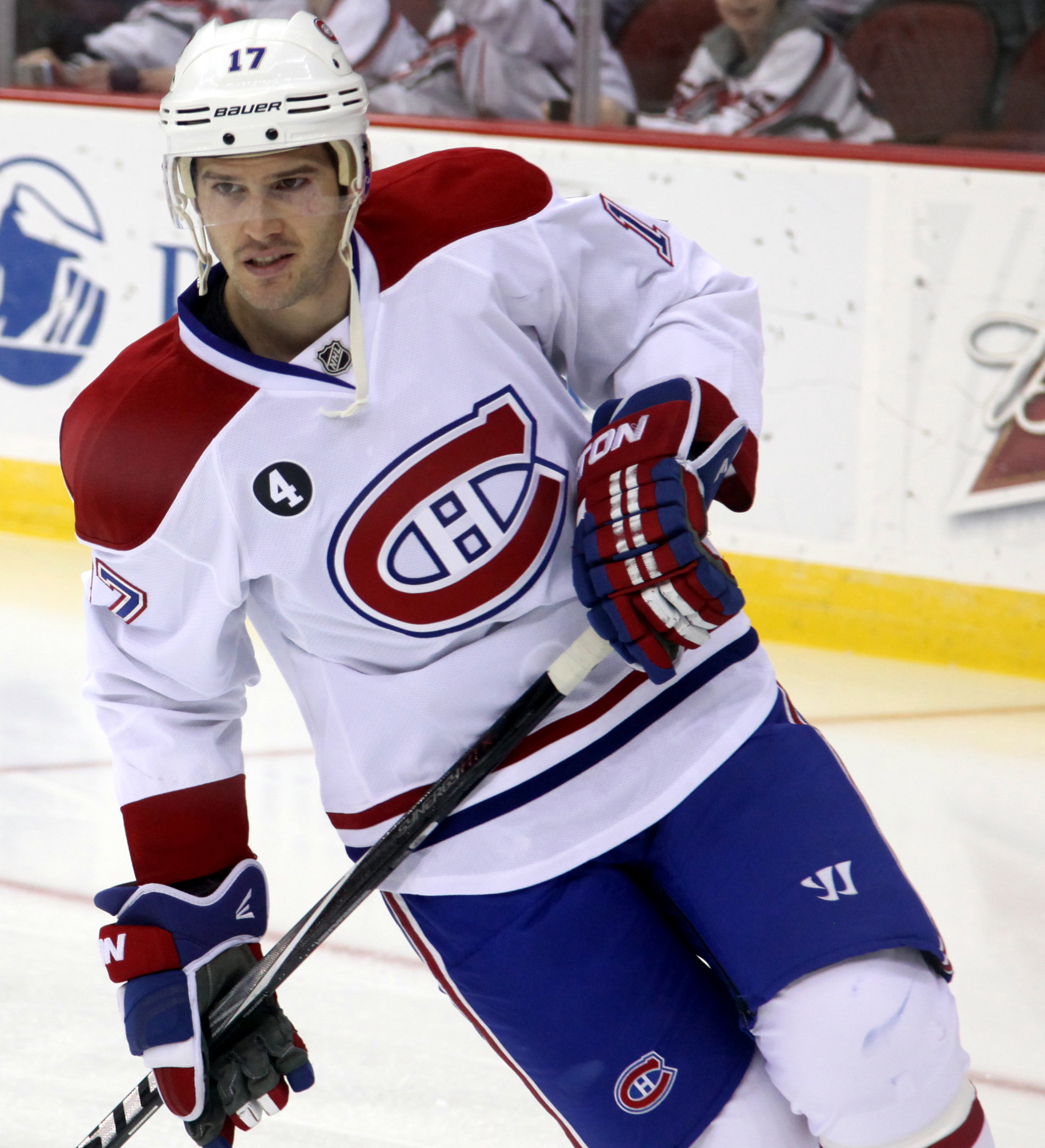
- Mitchell in April 2015
- Born: January 30, 1985 (age 41) Greenfield Park, Quebec, Canada
- Height: 5 ft 11 in (180 cm)
- Weight: 185 lb (84 kg; 13 st 3 lb)
- Position: Centre
- Shot: Right
- Played for: San Jose Sharks; Minnesota Wild; Buffalo Sabres; Montreal Canadiens; Los Angeles Kings; Lausanne HC
- NHL draft: 126th overall, 2004; San Jose Sharks
- Playing career: 2007–2019

Torrey Charles Mitchell (born January 30, 1985) is a Canadian former professional ice hockey centre. He was selected in the fourth round, 126th overall, by the San Jose Sharks in the 2004 NHL entry draft. Mitchell also previously played for the Minnesota Wild, Buffalo Sabres, Montreal Canadiens, Los Angeles Kings in the National Hockey League (NHL), as well as Lausanne HC of the National League (NL).

== Playing career ==
=== Amateur ===
Mitchell graduated from Selwyn House School and The Hotchkiss School before he attended the University of Vermont. During his Junior year at Vermont, he served as co-captain of the Catamounts. After the Catamounts' 2006–07 season, Mitchell left the school and played in the American Hockey League (AHL) for the Worcester Sharks. On March 31, 2007, Mitchell scored his first AHL goal against the Houston Aeros in a 7–3 victory.

=== Professional ===
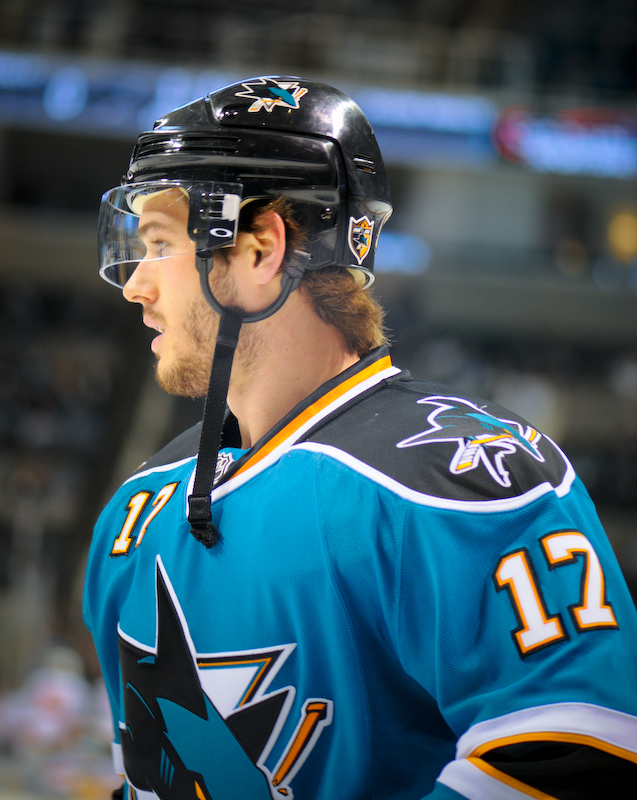
Mitchell with the San Jose Sharks in 2008

==== San Jose Sharks ====
In the summer of 2007, Mitchell attended the San Jose Sharks' training camp, and on October 4, 2007, he played his first NHL game against the Edmonton Oilers. He scored his first NHL goal on November 9, 2007, against Jean-Sébastien Giguère of the rival Anaheim Ducks. During that season, Mitchell spent most of his time playing on the third line with Patrick Rissmiller and Mike Grier, becoming a penalty-killing specialist with the Sharks. Mitchell also became a favourite among Shark fans when he scored a memorable goal in a game against the Ducks. The Sharks were killing a penalty, and Mitchell was able to grab the puck on a breakaway and score on Giguère while defenceman Mathieu Schneider was hooking from behind, even forcing Mitchell to fall on the ice before Mitchell got up and scored the goal. On April 10, 2008, Mitchell scored his first career NHL playoff goal in the second game of the first round series against the Calgary Flames, assisted by Ryane Clowe and Craig Rivet.

On September 21, 2008, during an open team practice, Mitchell was pushed by Brett Westgarth while skating full speed towards the net. He slammed into the right goal post and suffered a complete, non-displaced tibia/fibula fracture, commonly known as a "boot top fracture." The original estimate for his return to the ice was a minimum of two months after the incident. He resumed skating with the Sharks in practice in January 2009. He resumed play with a planned three-game conditioning assignment to the American Hockey League Worcester Sharks on January 16, 2009, but he suffered another injury to the same leg during play on January 18. He missed the remainder of the regular season, later making his season debut in the Sharks third playoff game.

After a 2008–09 season marred by injury, Mitchell became a restricted free agent in the off-season, eventually re-signing with the Sharks on a three-year, $4.1 million contract.

==== Minnesota Wild ====
On July 1, 2012, Mitchell signed as a free agent to a three-year contract with the Minnesota Wild. Due to the 2012–13 NHL lockout, however, Mitchell signed a standard contract with the San Francisco Bulls of the ECHL on December 31, 2012. He played his first official game as a Bull two days later and scored the only regulation goal for the team at their home arena, the Cow Palace, in a 2–1 shootout loss.

==== Buffalo Sabres ====
On March 5, 2014, Mitchell was traded to the Buffalo Sabres, along with a second-round draft pick in 2014 and a second-round pick in 2016 (traded to Montreal for Josh Gorges), in exchange for Matt Moulson and Cody McCormick. Mitchell finished the season with 2 goals and 10 points in 67 games.

==== Montreal Canadiens ====
In the following 2014–15 season, Mitchell was again moved at the NHL trade deadline – he was shipped to the Montreal Canadiens in exchange for Jack Nevins and a seventh-round draft pick in 2016 on March 2, 2015.

On June 15, 2015, Mitchell signed a three-year contract to remain with the Canadiens for a reported $3.6 million.

==== Los Angeles Kings ====
During the 2017–18 season, having played in 11 scoreless games in his fourth year within the Canadiens, Mitchell was traded to the Los Angeles Kings in exchange for a conditional fifth-round pick on November 23, 2017. In assuming a checking-line role with the Kings, Mitchell appeared in 49 games, registering 6 goals and 11 points.

==== Lausanne HC ====
As a free agent from the Kings, Mitchell opted to embark on a career abroad, agreeing to a one-year contract in Switzerland, worth CHF 700,000 with Lausanne HC of the National League (NL) on July 17, 2018. After only appearing in 28 regular season games (12 points) with Lausanne in 2018/19 and playing for Team Canada in the 2018 Spengler Cup, Mitchell's season came to an abrupt end suffering a career ending concussion in mid-January 2019.

In November 2019, he announced his retirement from professional hockey after receiving a concussion.

== Personal life ==
Mitchell’s father Steve was athletic director of Selwyn House School which Mitchell attended. His mother Sheila was a physical-education instructor at Champlain College Lennoxville. His older brother Josh is a high-school teacher and hockey coach at Heritage Regional High School in St-Hubert.

After retiring from playing professional hockey, Mitchell started a hockey training company and built a facility in Essex, Vermont with former University of Vermont teammate Peter Lenes. Mitchell has had a house in Vermont since 2010. He lives there with his wife Brindy and their three daughters.

== Career statistics ==
			Regular season					Playoffs
Season	Team	League	GP	G	A	Pts	PIM	GP	G	A	Pts	PIM
2001–02	Collège Charles–Lemoyne	QMAAA	41	15	41	56	54	—	—	—	—	—
2002–03	Hotchkiss School	HS Prep	26	19	30	49	33	—	—	—	—	—
2003–04	Hotchkiss School	HS Prep	25	25	37	62	42	—	—	—	—	—
2004–05	University of Vermont	ECAC	38	11	19	30	74	—	—	—	—	—
2005–06	University of Vermont	HE	38	12	28	40	34	—	—	—	—	—
2006–07	University of Vermont	HE	39	12	23	35	46	—	—	—	—	—
2006–07	Worcester Sharks	AHL	11	2	5	7	27	6	1	1	2	15
2007–08	San Jose Sharks	NHL	82	10	10	20	50	13	1	2	3	10
2008–09	Worcester Sharks	AHL	2	1	0	1	0	—	—	—	—	—
2008–09	San Jose Sharks	NHL	—	—	—	—	—	4	0	0	0	2
2009–10	San Jose Sharks	NHL	56	2	9	11	27	15	0	2	2	2
2009–10	Worcester Sharks	AHL	5	1	2	3	10	—	—	—	—	—
2010–11	San Jose Sharks	NHL	66	9	14	23	46	18	1	4	5	10
2011–12	San Jose Sharks	NHL	76	9	10	19	29	5	0	1	1	6
2012–13	San Francisco Bulls	ECHL	2	1	0	1	0	—	—	—	—	—
2012–13	Minnesota Wild	NHL	45	4	4	8	21	5	1	0	1	0
2013–14	Minnesota Wild	NHL	58	1	8	9	21	—	—	—	—	—
2013–14	Buffalo Sabres	NHL	9	1	0	1	4	—	—	—	—	—
2014–15	Buffalo Sabres	NHL	51	6	7	13	26	—	—	—	—	—
2014–15	Montreal Canadiens	NHL	14	0	1	1	8	12	1	4	5	6
2015–16	Montreal Canadiens	NHL	71	11	8	19	51	—	—	—	—	—
2016–17	Montreal Canadiens	NHL	78	8	9	17	38	3	1	0	1	0
2017–18	Montreal Canadiens	NHL	11	0	0	0	2	—	—	—	—	—
2017–18	Los Angeles Kings	NHL	49	6	5	11	28	4	0	0	0	0
2018–19	Lausanne HC	NL	28	7	5	12	8	—	—	—	—	—
NHL totals			666	67	85	152	351	79	5	13	18	36

== Awards and honours ==
Award	Year
College
All-ECAC Hockey Rookie Team	2004–05
