= Peter Lenes =

American ice hockey player

- Born: April 3, 1986 (age 38); Shelburne, Vermont, U.S.
- Height: 5 ft 6 in (168 cm)
- Weight: 160 lb (73 kg; 11 st 6 lb)
- Position: Right wing
- Shot: Left
- Played for: Graz 99ers Hamilton Bulldogs
- NHL draft: Undrafted
- Playing career: 2009–2020

Peter Lenes (born April 3, 1986) is a former American ice hockey player. He last played for the EC Kitzbuhel of the Alps Hockey League.

Prior to turning professional, Lenes attended the University of Vermont where he played four seasons of NCAA Division I college hockey with the Vermont Catamounts men's ice hockey team where he scored 46 goals and 46 assists for 92 points in 148 games.

On January 11, 2012, the Trenton Titans of the ECHL traded Lenes, along with defenseman Jordon Southorn, to the Wheeling Nailers in exchange for future considerations.

On July 31, 2013, Lenes returned for to attempt a second stint in Austria, signing a try-out deal as a free agent with Dornbirner EC.

Lenes has since retired from playing professional hockey and started a hockey training and development company with former NHLer and University of Vermont teammate Torrey Mitchell.

== Career statistics ==
			Regular season					Playoffs
Season	Team	League	GP	G	A	Pts	PIM	GP	G	A	Pts	PIM
2004–05	Sioux City Musketeers	USHL	60	13	13	26	60	13	3	2	5	12
2005–06	University of Vermont	HE	32	13	7	20	27	—	—	—	—	—
2006–07	University of Vermont	HE	38	8	11	19	28	—	—	—	—	—
2007–08	University of Vermont	HE	37	2	12	14	45	—	—	—	—	—
2008–09	University of Vermont	HE	39	15	16	31	20	—	—	—	—	—
2009–10	Ontario Reign	ECHL	58	13	10	23	20	—	—	—	—	—
2010–11	Graz 99ers	EBEL	49	10	10	20	22	4	0	0	0	2
2011–12	Trenton Titans	ECHL	32	7	5	12	18	—	—	—	—	—
2011–12	Wheeling Nailers	ECHL	38	15	15	30	10	2	0	0	0	0
2011–12	Hamilton Bulldogs	AHL	1	0	0	0	2	—	—	—	—	—
2012–13	Wheeling Nailers	ECHL	57	13	13	26	12	—	—	—	—	—
2013–14	Esbjerg EfB Ishockey	Metal Ligaen	6	1	2	3	8	—	—	—	—	—
2014–15	EC Kitzbuhel	AlpsHL	29	19	26	45	6	4	3	5	8	8
2015–16	EC Kitzbuhel	AlpsHL	32	19	25	44	38	6	3	3	6	22
2016–17	EC Kitzbuhel	AlpsHL	28	12	21	33	14	—	—	—	—	—
2017-18	EC Kitzbuhel	AlpsHL	21	10	13	33	2	—	—	—	—	—
2018-19	EC Kitzbuhel	AlpsHL	34	21	22	43	30	2	0	3	3	2
ECHL			185	48	43	91	60	2	0	0	0	0
