= San Antonio Rampage =

Ice hockey team

- City: San Antonio, Texas
- League: American Hockey League
- Conference: Western
- Division: Central
- Founded: 1971
- Operated: 2002–2020
- Home arena: AT&T Center
- Colors: Black, dark gray, silver, white
- Owner: Spurs Sports & Entertainment
- Affiliates: Florida Panthers (2002–2005, 2011–2015); Phoenix Coyotes (2005–2011); Colorado Avalanche (2015–2018); St. Louis Blues (2018–2020)

Franchise history
- 1971–1972: Tidewater Wings
- 1972–1975: Virginia Wings
- 1979–1999: Adirondack Red Wings
- 2002–2020: San Antonio Rampage
- 2020–present: Henderson Silver Knights

Championships
- Division titles: 1 (2014–15)

The San Antonio Rampage were a professional ice hockey team in the American Hockey League based in San Antonio, Texas. The Rampage was primarily owned by Spurs Sports & Entertainment throughout the team's existence. In 2020, the franchise was sold to the Vegas Golden Knights and relocated as the Henderson Silver Knights.

== History ==
In 2000, construction began on the SBC Center, located next to the Freeman Coliseum, home of the Central Hockey League's San Antonio Iguanas. Partnering with the Florida Panthers, the Spurs bought the dormant Adirondack Red Wings franchise and moved it to San Antonio. Following the acquisition of an AHL franchise, local investment for the Iguanas quickly dissipated, and the CHL franchise folded. Originally, the team was to be named the San Antonio Stampede. However, when a local semipro football team objected, the name was changed to the Rampage.

On June 30, 2005, Spurs Sports & Entertainment purchased the Panthers' interest in the franchise, assuming sole ownership of the AHL club. They also entered a multi-year affiliation agreement with the Phoenix Coyotes. On September 7, 2006, the Rampage unveiled their new uniforms with the official colors now being black, white and silver (the same motif used by the Spurs, as well as other Spurs-owned teams). While the primary and secondary logos remain the same, the crest of the jerseys now displayed just the bull's head.

On April 11, 2007, the Coyotes announced that they had fired Rampage general manager Laurence Gilman, who had been with the Coyotes organization for 13 years. On November 23, 2009, the Phoenix Coyotes fired Greg Ireland. He was replaced by assistant coach Ray Edwards; Mike Pelino was named assistant coach. Ray Edwards was officially named head coach of the San Antonio Rampage prior to the 2010–11 season.

After the 2010–11 AHL season, the Coyotes came to an agreement with the Portland Pirates to be their new AHL affiliate, and San Antonio became Florida's top affiliate for a second time.

In the 2011–12 season, the Rampage finished with a record of 41–30–3–2, good for 87 points to qualify for the sixth playoff seed in the Western Conference. They faced the third-seeded Chicago Wolves in the first round, taking Game 1 and Game 2 at home to take a 2–0 series lead in the best-of-five series. They then lost to the Wolves in Games 3 and 4 in Chicago, leading to a Game 5. In Game 5, the Rampage took a 2–0 lead, but the Wolves rallied to tie the game, sending it into overtime. After 25 minutes of overtime, San Antonio winger Bill Thomas passed to center Jon Matsumoto, feeding defenceman Roman Derlyuk to score the series winning goal on his belly to secure the first series win in franchise history for the Rampage. The goal is known to many fans as the Goal Heard Round the Alamo, and is considered the most important in Rampage history.

On March 18, 2015, the Florida Panthers announced they had entered into an affiliation agreement with the Portland Pirates to begin in the 2015–16 season, thus ending the Panthers' second term as San Antonio's NHL affiliate. On April 17, 2015, it was announced that the Rampage had come to a five-year affiliation agreement with the Colorado Avalanche.

During the 2017 off-season, it was reported that the Avalanche would promote its ECHL affiliate, the Colorado Eagles, to the AHL in 2018 while the Rampage would officially affiliate with the St. Louis Blues beginning with the 2018–19 AHL season. For the 2017–18 season, as the Blues did not have an official AHL affiliate after the Vegas Golden Knights partnered with their former affiliate, both the Avalanche and Blues would send AHL prospects to the Rampage.

On February 6, 2020, the Vegas Golden Knights announced it had purchased the franchise from the Spurs with the intent to relocate it to the Las Vegas area. The purchase and relocation was approved by the league on February 28. The team initially played at the Orleans Arena in Paradise, Nevada, while the club's new 6,000-seat arena, named Dollar Loan Center, was constructed in downtown Henderson, Nevada.

Their main rivals were the Texas Stars (located near Austin) and, from 2002 to 2013, the Houston Aeros.

The market was previously served by:

- San Antonio Iguanas of the CHL (1994–1997, 1998–2002)
- San Antonio Dragons of the IHL (1996–1998)

== Season-by-season results ==
Regular season												Playoffs				
Season	Games	Won	Lost	Tied	OTL	SOL	Points	PCT	Goals for	Goals against	Standing	Year	1st round	2nd round	3rd round	Finals
2002–03	80	36	29	11	4	—	87	.544	235	226	3rd, West	2003	L, 0–3, NOR	—	—	—
2003–04	80	30	42	8	0	—	68	.425	191	231	6th, West	2004	Did not qualify			
2004–05	80	27	45	—	5	3	62	.388	156	232	6th, West	2005	Did not qualify			
2005–06	80	23	50	—	3	4	53	.331	153	251	7th, West	2006	Did not qualify			
2006–07	80	32	42	—	2	4	70	.438	219	256	6th, West	2007	Did not qualify			
2007–08	80	42	28	—	3	7	94	.588	238	225	5th, West	2008	L, 3–4, TOR	—	—	—
2008–09	80	36	38	—	2	4	78	.488	205	243	8th, West	2009	Did not qualify			
2009–10	80	36	32	—	5	7	84	.525	235	244	6th, West	2010	Did not qualify			
2010–11	80	38	33	—	4	5	87	.544	228	245	7th, West	2011	Did not qualify			
2011–12	76	41	30	—	3	2	87	.572	197	204	3rd, West	2012	W, 3–2, CHI	L, 1–4, OKC	—	—
2012–13	76	29	38	—	2	7	67	.441	195	241	5th, South	2013	Did not qualify			
2013–14	76	30	37	—	3	6	69	.454	206	235	5th, West	2014	Did not qualify			
2014–15	76	45	23	—	7	1	98	.645	248	222	1st, West	2015	L, 0–3, OKC	—	—	—
2015–16	76	33	35	—	8	0	74	.487	213	240	7th, Pacific	2016	Did not qualify			
2016–17	76	27	42	—	5	2	61	.401	184	240	8th, Pacific	2017	Did not qualify			
2017–18	76	35	31	—	10	0	80	.526	198	219	8th, Pacific	2018	Did not qualify			
2018–19	76	31	38	—	6	1	69	.454	196	244	8th, Central	2019	Did not qualify			
2019–20	61	24	25	—	7	5	60	.492	161	184	7th, Central	2020	Season cancelled due to the COVID-19 pandemic			

== Players ==
=== Captains ===
- Lee Goren, 2003–2004
- Paul Healey, 2004–2005
- Bryan Helmer, 2006–2008
- Steven Goertzen, 2008–2009
- Jeff Hoggan, 2009–2010
- Nolan Yonkman, 2010–2013
- Greg Rallo, 2013–2014
- Greg Zanon, 2014–2015
- Ben Street, 2015–2016
- Joe Whitney, 2016–2017
- Chris Butler, 2017–2019
- Jordan Nolan, 2019–2020

== Team records ==
=== Single season ===
- Goals: Don MacLean, 33 (2006–07)
- Assists: Yanick Lehoux, 42 (2006–07)
- Points: Yanick Lehoux, 73 (2006–07)
- Points (Defenceman): Colby Robak, 39 (2011–12)
- Penalty minutes: Pete Vandermeer, 332 (2007–08)
- GAA: Jacob Markstrom, 2.32 (2011–12)
- SV%: Travis Scott, .931 (2004–05)

=== Career ===
- Career goals: Brett MacLean, 74
- Career assists: Brett MacLean, 81
- Career points: Brett MacLean, 155
- Career penalty minutes: Francis Lessard, 613
- Career goaltending wins: Josh Tordjman, 82
- Career shutouts: Josh Tordjman, Ville Husso, 9
- Career games: Sean Sullivan, 212
