= Laurence Gilman =

Canadian ice hockey executive

Laurence Gilman (born January 6, 1965, in Winnipeg, Manitoba) is a Canadian ice hockey executive for the Columbus Blue Jackets. He has previously held assistant general manager positions for the Vancouver Canucks and the Toronto Maple Leafs of the National Hockey League (NHL).

Prior to joining the Canucks, Gilman was employed for 13 years by the Winnipeg Jets/Phoenix Coyotes organization, including stints as the team's assistant general manager and general manager of the San Antonio Rampage of the American Hockey League.

On July 2, 2015, he was fired from the Vancouver Canucks.

On January 6, 2026, he joined the Columbus Blue Jackets as the vice president of hockey operations.
