= 2012–13 Pittsburgh Penguins season =

NHL team season

2012–13 Pittsburgh Penguins
- Atlantic Division champions
- Division: 1st Atlantic
- Conference: 1st Eastern
- 2012–13 record: 36–12–0
- Home record: 18–6–0
- Road record: 18–6–0
- Goals for: 165
- Goals against: 119

Team information
- General manager: Ray Shero
- Coach: Dan Bylsma
- Captain: Sidney Crosby
- Alternate captains: Chris Kunitz; Evgeni Malkin; Brooks Orpik
- Arena: Consol Energy Center
- Average attendance: 18,648 (101.4%) (24 games)

Team leaders
- Goals: Chris Kunitz (22)
- Assists: Sidney Crosby (41)
- Points: Sidney Crosby (56)
- Penalty minutes: Tanner Glass (62)
- Plus/minus: Pascal Dupuis (+31)
- Wins: Marc-Andre Fleury (23)
- Goals against average: Marc-Andre Fleury (2.39)

The 2012–13 Pittsburgh Penguins season was the franchise's 46th season in the National Hockey League (NHL). The regular season was reduced from its usual 82 games to 48 due to a lockout.

== Off-season ==
The Pittsburgh Penguins finished their 2011–12 season with 108 points, ranking second in the Atlantic Division and fourth in the Eastern Conference. Pittsburgh started off the 2012 Stanley Cup playoffs in the Eastern Conference Quarter-finals against their cross-state rivals, the Philadelphia Flyers. Pittsburgh eventually went on to lose in six games, with Philadelphia taking the series 4–2. The 45 goals scored through the first four games set an NHL record for goals in the first four games of a seven-game series. A total of 56 goals were scored over the course of the entire series.

After elimination, Pittsburgh went on to sign 2010 draft pick Reid McNeill on May 15, 2012 and 2011 draft pick Dominik Uher on June 1, 2012 to three-year entry-level contracts. On June 4, 2012, the Penguins signed goaltender Tomas Vokoun to a two-year contract after acquiring him from the Washington Capitals for a seventh-round draft pick in 2012. On June 28, 2012, the Penguins agreed to terms with All-Star center Sidney Crosby to a 12-year contract extension worth $104.4 million, but due to the terms of the current NHL Collective Bargaining Agreement, the new deal could not be signed until July 1, 2012.

=== Lockout ===
At 11:59 p.m. (EDT) on September 15, 2012, following the expiration of the NHL collective bargaining agreement (CBA) the owners declared a lockout of the members of the National Hockey League Players' Association (NHLPA) until a new agreement could be reached. As a result, training camps will not open until agreement on a new CBA is reached.

Cancellation announcements

- On September 19, 2012 the NHL announced the cancellation of pre-season games through September 30, 2012
- On September 27, 2012 the NHL announced the cancellation of the remaining pre-season games.
- On October 4, 2012 the NHL announced the cancellation of regular season games through October 24, 2012.
- On October 18, 2012 the NHL announced the cancellation of regular season games through November 1, 2012.
- On October 26, 2012 the NHL announced the cancellation of regular season games through November 30, 2012.
- On November 2, 2012 the NHL announced the cancellation of the 2013 Bridgestone Winter Classic between the Detroit Red Wings and the Toronto Maple Leafs scheduled for January 1, 2013. The NHL also announced the cancellation of all events at the SiriusXM Hockeytown Winter Festival scheduled for December 16–31, 2012 at Comerica Park in Detroit.
- On November 23, 2012 the NHL announced the cancellation of regular season games through December 14, 2012 and announced the cancellation of the 2013 NHL All-Star weekend schedule for January 26–27, 2013 in Columbus, Ohio.
- On December 10, 2012 the NHL announced the cancellation of regular season games through December 30, 2012.
- On December 20, 2012 the NHL announced the cancellation of regular season games through January 14, 2013.

2012–13 Cancelled Games
Pre-season

#	Date	Time	Visitor	Score	Home	Location/Attendance	Record	Points
1	Sep 24	7:00 pm	Pittsburgh Penguins	Cancelled	Columbus Blue Jackets	Nationwide Arena	0-0-0	N/A
2	Sep 26	7:00 pm	Detroit Red Wings	Cancelled	Pittsburgh Penguins	Consol Energy Center	0-0-0	N/A
3	Sep 29	3:00 pm	Columbus Blue Jackets	Cancelled	Pittsburgh Penguins	Consol Energy Center	0-0-0	N/A
4	Sep 30	7:00 pm	Pittsburgh Penguins	Cancelled	Chicago Blackhawks	United Center	0-0-0	N/A
5	Oct 3	7:00 pm	Pittsburgh Penguins	Cancelled	Detroit Red Wings	Joe Louis Arena	0-0-0	N/A
6	Oct 5	7:00 pm	Chicago Blackhawks	Cancelled	Pittsburgh Penguins	Consol Energy Center	0-0-0	N/A

October

#	Oct	Time	Visitor	Score	Home	Location/Attendance	Record	Points
1	12	7:00 pm	New York Islanders	Cancelled	Pittsburgh Penguins	Consol Energy Center		
2	13	7:00 pm	Pittsburgh Penguins	Cancelled	Buffalo Sabres	First Niagara Center		
3	16	7:00 pm	Ottawa Senators	Cancelled	Pittsburgh Penguins	Consol Energy Center		
4	18	7:00 pm	Pittsburgh Penguins	Cancelled	Philadelphia Flyers	Wells Fargo Center		
5	20	8:00 pm	Pittsburgh Penguins	Cancelled	Nashville Predators	Bridgestone Arena		
6	23	7:00 pm	Vancouver Canucks	Cancelled	Pittsburgh Penguins	Consol Energy Center		
7	25	7:00 pm	New York Rangers	Cancelled	Pittsburgh Penguins	Consol Energy Center		
8	26	7:30 pm	Pittsburgh Penguins	Cancelled	Ottawa Senators	Scotiabank Place		
9	31	7:30 pm	Pittsburgh Penguins	Cancelled	Washington Capitals	Verizon Center		

November

#	Nov	Time	Visitor	Score	Home	Location/Attendance	Record	Points
10	2	7:00 pm	Pittsburgh Penguins	Cancelled	Columbus Blue Jackets	Nationwide Arena		
11	3	7:00 pm	Pittsburgh Penguins	Cancelled	New Jersey Devils	Prudential Center		
12	5	8:30 pm	Pittsburgh Penguins	Cancelled	Chicago Blackhawks	United Center		
13	7	7:30 pm	Pittsburgh Penguins	Cancelled	Toronto Maple Leafs	Air Canada Centre		
14	10	1:00 pm	Edmonton Oilers	Cancelled	Pittsburgh Penguins	Consol Energy Center		
15	13	7:00 pm	Colorado Avalanche	Cancelled	Pittsburgh Penguins	Consol Energy Center		
16	15	7:00 pm	Toronto Maple Leafs	Cancelled	Pittsburgh Penguins	Consol Energy Center		
17	16	7:30 pm	Pittsburgh Penguins	Cancelled	Ottawa Senators	Scotiabank Place		
18	19	7:30 pm	Pittsburgh Penguins	Cancelled	Detroit Red Wings	Joe Louis Arena		
19	21	7:00 pm	New Jersey Devils	Cancelled	Pittsburgh Penguins	Consol Energy Center		
20	23	7:00 pm	Carolina Hurricanes	Cancelled	Pittsburgh Penguins	Consol Energy Center		
21	24	7:00 pm	Pittsburgh Penguins	Cancelled	Boston Bruins	TD Garden		
22	26	7:00 pm	Minnesota Wild	Cancelled	Pittsburgh Penguins	Consol Energy Center		
23	29	7:00 pm	San Jose Sharks	Cancelled	Pittsburgh Penguins	Consol Energy Center		

December

#	Dec	Time	Visitor	Score	Home	Location/Attendance	Record	Points
24	1	2:00 pm	Pittsburgh Penguins	Cancelled	Dallas Stars	American Airlines Center		
25	4	7:00 pm	Carolina Hurricanes	Cancelled	Pittsburgh Penguins	Consol Energy Center		
26	6	7:00 pm	St. Louis Blues	Cancelled	Pittsburgh Penguins	Consol Energy Center		
27	8	7:00 pm	Pittsburgh Penguins	Cancelled	New Jersey Devils	Prudential Center		
28	10	7:00 pm	Winnipeg Jets	Cancelled	Pittsburgh Penguins	Consol Energy Center		
29	11	7:00 pm	Pittsburgh Penguins	Cancelled	Washington Capitals	Verizon Center		
30	13	7:00 pm	Pittsburgh Penguins	Cancelled	Boston Bruins	TD Garden		
31	15	7:00 pm	Pittsburgh Penguins	Cancelled	Winnipeg Jets	MTS Centre		
32	17	7:00 pm	New Jersey Devils	Cancelled	Pittsburgh Penguins	Consol Energy Center		
33	21	7:00 pm	Winnipeg Jets	Cancelled	Pittsburgh Penguins	Consol Energy Center		
34	22	7:00 pm	Pittsburgh Penguins	Cancelled	New York Islanders	Nassau Coliseum		
35	27	7:00 pm	Detroit Red Wings	Cancelled	Pittsburgh Penguins	Consol Energy Center		
36	29	1:00 pm	Pittsburgh Penguins	Cancelled	New York Islanders	Nassau Coliseum		
37	31	7:00 pm	Washington Capitals	Cancelled	Pittsburgh Penguins	Consol Energy Center		

January

#	Jan	Time	Visitor	Score	Home	Location/Attendance	Record	Points
38	4	7:00 pm	Florida Panthers	Cancelled	Pittsburgh Penguins	Consol Energy Center		
39	5	7:00 pm	Pittsburgh Penguins	Cancelled	New Jersey Devils	Prudential Center		
40	8	7:00 pm	Tampa Bay Lightning	Cancelled	Pittsburgh Penguins	Consol Energy Center		
41	11	10:00 pm	Pittsburgh Penguins	Cancelled	Anaheim Ducks	Honda Center		
42	12	8:00 pm	Pittsburgh Penguins	Cancelled	Phoenix Coyotes	Jobing.com Arena		

==== Resolution ====
At approximately 4:40 am EST on January 6, 2013 the NHL Commissioner Gary Bettman and NHLPA Executive Director Donald Fehr announced that they have reached an agreement on the framework of a new CBA. On January 9, 2013 the NHL Board of Governors voted unanimously to accept the new 10-year CBA between the NHL and the NHLPA, but will not become official until the NHLPA completes a ratification vote. The NHLPA announced that ratification voting would start at 8 pm (EST) Thursday (January 10, 2013) and will continue for 36 hours through Saturday (January 12, 2013) at 8 am (EST). On January 12, 2013 the NHLPA announced that the union had voted to ratify the new CBA with the NHL, but the new CBA will not become official until the NHL and the NHLPA sign a Memorandum of understanding (MOU). Later that same day both the NHL and the NHLPA announced that both sides signed the MOU reflecting the terms of the new 10-year CBA officially ending the lockout and announcing a 720-game (48 per team) regular-season schedule will begin on January 19, 2013.

== Regular season ==
=== January ===
The Penguins released a statement from co-owners Mario Lemieux and Ron Burkle and CEO David Morehouse shortly after the NHL announced the framework agreement, offering an apology to the fans and the community and thanking them for their patience and loyalty to the team. As part of the organization thanking the fans and community for their loyalty, the Penguins organization announced that they would offer free selected concession items and "half off" all merchandise during the team's first four home games. In preparation of the start of the regular season the Penguins scheduled a free to fans "Black & Gold" game on January 16, 2013, which would simulate a game-like atmosphere with teammates facing teammates. The Penguins fans showed their appreciation to the organization by filling the CONSOL Energy Center with approximately 18,000 fans (official attendance could not be compiled without a ticket count due to the game's being open and free to the public) with the organization naming the fans as the number one star of the game. Team Black defeated Team White 5–4 in a game which simulated various scenarios (random five-on-three, four-on-four situations) including a full five-minute overtime and a shootout.

Black and Gold Game Rosters

Team Black (Visitors)
No.	Goalie	
29	Marc-Andre Fleury	
81	Patrick Killeen	
No.	Pos	Player
2	D	Matt Niskanen
5	D	Deryk Engelland
7	D	Paul Martin
10	LW	Tanner Glass
12	RW	Jayson Megna
15	C	Dustin Jeffrey
16	C	Brandon Sutter
24	LW	Matt Cooke
27	RW	Craig Adams
32	D	Brian Domoulin
41	D	Robert Bortuzzo
44	D	Brooks Orpik
45	C	Riley Holzapfel
46	C	Joe Vitale
48	RW	Tyler Kennedy
55	D	Philip Samuelsson
57	C	Brian Gibbons
62	C	Dominik Uher
65	C	Adam Payerl

Officials
Referees:	Tony Trovato (#20)
Referees:	Jason Mirich (#119)
Linesmen:	Zach Roberts (#43)
Linesmen:	Justin Eckman (#86)
Anthem:	Kenzie Palmer

Team White (Home)
No.	Goalie	
92	Tomas Vokoun	
81	Patrick Killeen	
No.	Pos	Player
6	D	Ben Lovejoy
9	RW	Pascal Dupuis
14	LW	Chris Kunitz
18	RW	James Neal
19	RW	Beau Bennett
23	LW	Trevor Smith
25	LW	Eric Tangradi
33	LW	Steve MacIntyre
37	D	Brian Strait
42	D	Dylan Reese
43	C	Warren Peters
47	D	Simon Despres
51	C	Zach Sill
52	D	Alex Grant
56	RW	Paul Thompson
58	D	Kris Letang
70	D	Joe Morrow
71	C	Evgeni Malkin
87	C	Sidney Crosby

Coaches
Period 1 & 2	Team White	Dan Bylsma
Period 1 & 2	Team White	Tom Fitzgerald
Period 1 & 2	Team Black	Tony Granato
Period 1 & 2	Team Black	Todd Reirden
Period 3 & OT	Team White	Tony Granato
Period 3 & OT	Team White	Todd Reirden
Period 3 & OT	Team Black	Dan Bylsma
Period 3 & OT	Team Black	Tom Fitzgerald

The Penguins started the season with a win over their cross-state rivals the Philadelphia Flyers that propelled Marc-Andre Fleury past Tom Barrasso to become the Penguins' all-time winning goaltender. While the Penguins went on to finish the month with four wins and three losses they did not win a game at home in the seven games in January.

=== February ===
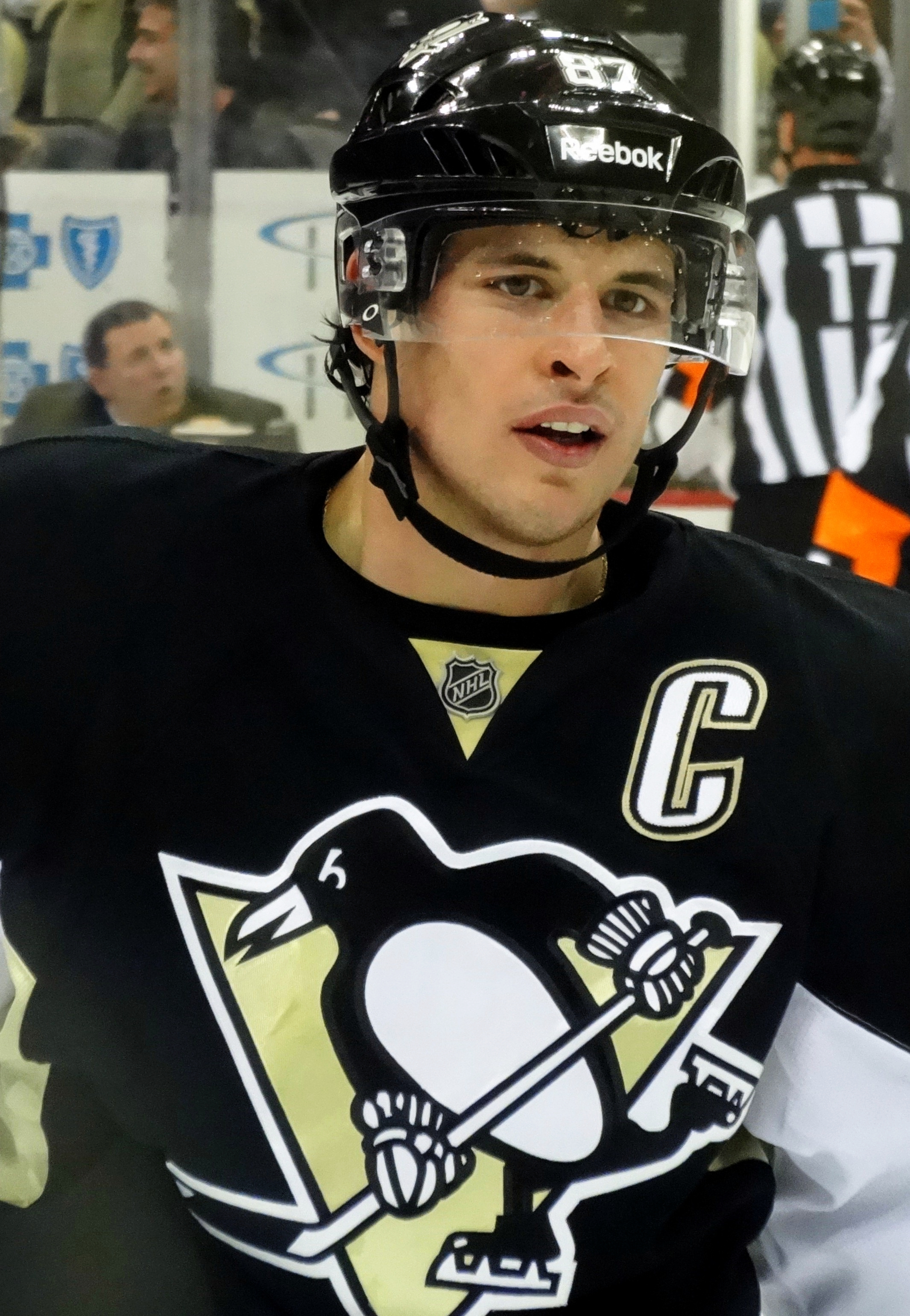
Sidney Crosby named NHL Second Star of the Month of February

The Penguins started February with a four-game winning streak including their first home victory of the season against the New Jersey Devils. In a game on February 3 against the Washington Capitals, Chris Kunitz set a career milestone for scoring four goals in one game and was then named NHL Second Star of the Week. With 18.7 seconds left in the second period in a game on February 13 against the Ottawa Senators, Matt Cooke went to finish a hit on Erik Karlsson when Cooke's skate blade caught Karlsson on the back of his left leg lacerating his left Achilles. Throughout the first four home games, as part of the special promotion following the lockout, the Penguins organization gave away 52,142 fountain drinks, 33,289 nachos, 26,633 pretzels, 22,258 hot dogs, 22,118 chicken sandwiches and 20,380 hamburgers and sold at half-price 8,680 jerseys, 18,950 T-shirts and 8,776 hats. In a game against the Florida Panthers on February 22, during the third period, Evgeni Malkin was skating toward the Panthers net when he got tangled up with Panthers defenceman Erik Gudbranson and then crashed violently into the boards. Malkin went on to miss the rest of the remaining three games of February and was diagnosed with a concussion suffering from short-term memory loss and retroactively was placed on IR effective the time of initial injury. Sidney Crosby was named NHL Second Star of the Month leading the NHL with 18 assists and 24 points in the 14 games during the month and had six three-point games while obtaining at least one point in eleven of fourteen games. The Penguins lost the last game of February against ex-Penguin Jordan Staal of the Carolina Hurricanes but still finished the month with nine wins and five losses leading the Atlantic Division and second place in the Eastern Conference with twenty-six points.

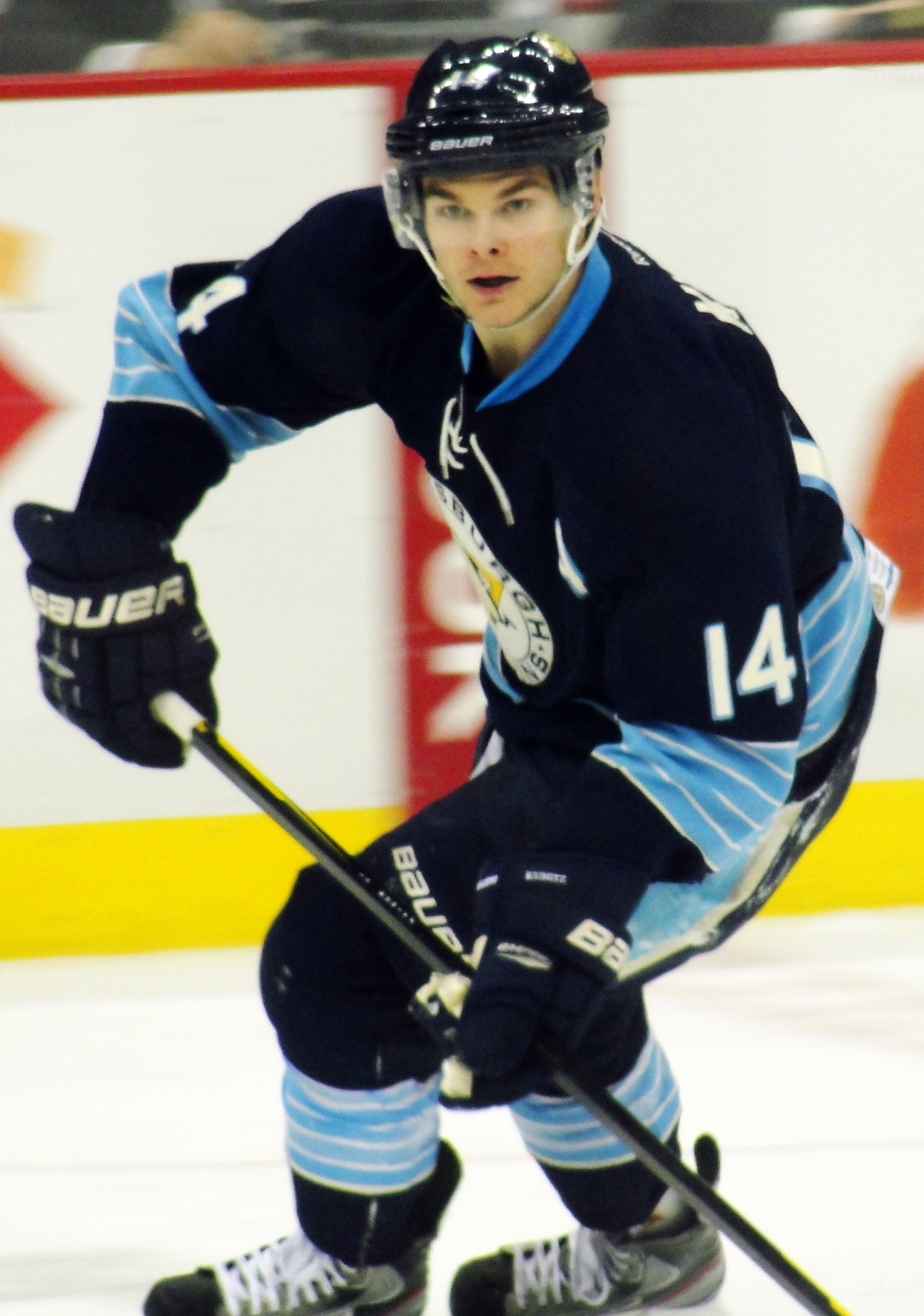
Chris Kunitz had a career-high five-point game during March.

=== March ===
The Penguins started out March with a wild game against the Montreal Canadiens that combined for a total of thirteen goals including the Brandon Sutter game-winner in overtime. The game featured Brandon Sutter, Matt Cooke and Chris Kunitz all scoring two goals apiece with defenceman Kris Letang finished with a career-high four assist night. After missing four games, Evgeni Malkin made his return to the lineup against the Tampa Bay Lightning on March 4 where he tallied a goal and an assist before defeating the Lightning 4–3. Chris Kunitz extended his career-long point streak to six games scoring six goals and nine points during the stretch and has at least one point in eighteen of the Penguins' last 23 games. After falling behind the Philadelphia Flyers 4–1 in the first period on March 7, and being outshot 18–4, the Penguins tied the score in the second period 4–4 outshooting the Flyers 12–3 eventually defeating the Flyers 5–4. Chris Kunitz scored twice in the game extending his career-long point streak to seven games as he and his linemates (Sidney Crosby, Pascal Dupuis) combined for three goals and eight points in the game. James Neal scored his sixteenth goal of the season thirty-six seconds into the March 9 game against the Toronto Maple Leafs but despite the early lead the Leafs tied the game and sent the game to a shootout. Marc-Andre Fleury stopped Tyler Bozak and Nazem Kadri with James Neal and Sidney Crosby scoring on James Reimer with James Neal scoring the determining goal. Chris Kunitz saw his career-long point streak end being held without a point against the Leafs. After absorbing a hit from James van Riemsdyk in the third period, Evgeni Malkin left the game with an upper-body injury and did not return.

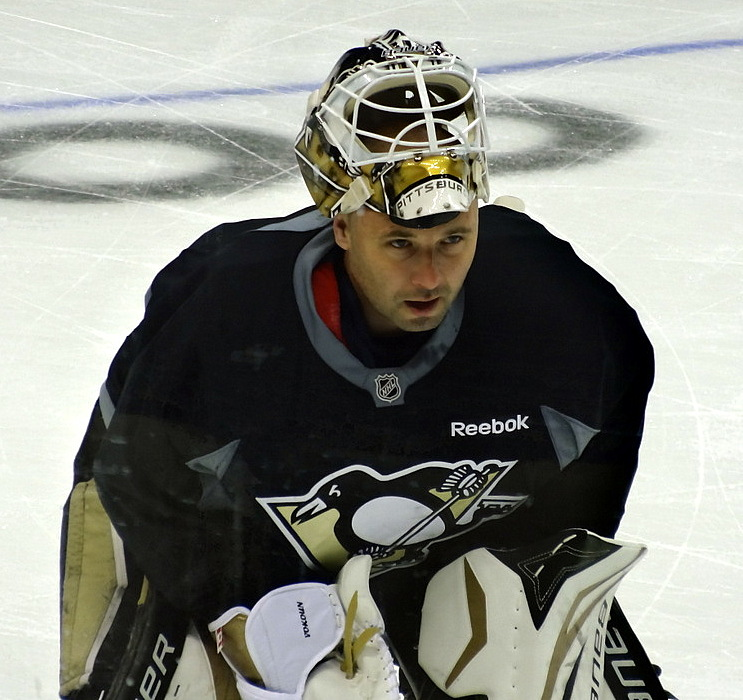
Tomas Vokoun recorded his 50th Career NHL shutout on March 28, 2013

The Penguins played the next night against the New York Islanders in an offensive showing by the Penguins defeating the Islanders 6–1. The game featured Chris Kunitz scoring his fourth career hat-trick and had a career-high five-point game, Pascal Dupuis scoring twice and Sidney Crosby finishing with five assists tying a single-game career-high. Sidney Crosby was named NHL Second Star of the Week scoring two goals, nine assists and eleven points through the week during an eight-game point streak. In a game that seemed likely to be the Penguins first game being shutout of the season, also proved to be one of the Penguins biggest come-back games of the season. After being held scoreless throughout 53:42 minutes of March 12 game against the Boston Bruins, Chris Kunitz scored with Brandon Sutter scoring twice with the game-winner coming with only 2:03 minutes left in regulation. The next game against the Toronto Maple Leafs started out the same way as the last did with the Penguins falling behind and being held off the scoreboard until 7:18 minutes of the third period. The Penguins who were behind 1–0 saw Pascal Dupuis score the tying as well as the game-winning goal with Craig Adams scoring an empty net goal with 9.4 seconds left tallying the Penguins first short-handed goal of the season defeating the Leafs 3–1. On March 16, in a game against the New York Rangers, Marc-Andre Fleury recorded a franchise all-time leading 23rd career shutout in a 3–0 victory.

The Penguins tenth straight win came on March 19 with a 2–1 win over the Washington Capitals when Matt Niskanen scored the game-winning goal late in the third period just nine seconds after the Penguins killed off a four-minute Matt Cooke penalty for boarding and unsportsmanlike conduct. On March 24 the Penguins announced that they acquired 13-year veteran and Dallas Stars captain Brenden Morrow in exchange for Joe Morrow and a 2013 fifth-round draft pick after Morrow waived his no-trade clause to play for the Penguins. Later that evening the Penguins went on to defeat the Philadelphia Flyers 2–1 in overtime extending the winning streak to 12 games surpassing the Chicago Blackhawks with the longest winning streak in the NHL this year. The next day the Penguins announced that they acquired defenceman Douglas Murray from the San Jose Sharks in exchange for a 2013 second-round draft pick and a 2014 conditional second-round draft pick. The Penguins defeated the Canadiens 1–0 on March 26 with a lone goal from Chris Kunitz in a game that featured Marc-Andre Fleury and Tomas Vokoun combining for a team shutout after Marc-Andre Fleury left that game after the second period when Tyler Kennedy and Brian Gionta got tangled up and crashed into him. The next day defenseman Kris Letang was placed on Injured Reserve and will be out 7–10 days with a lower-body injury.

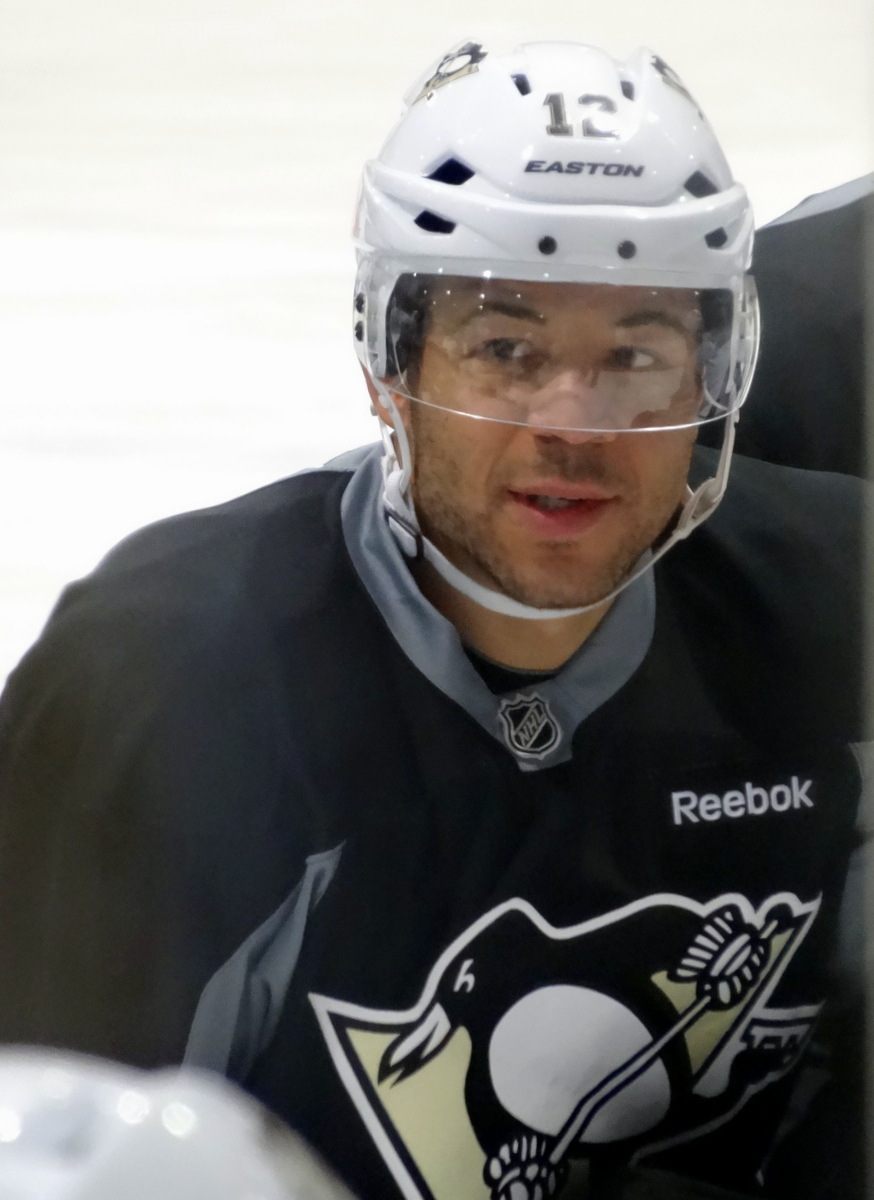

In the early morning hours on March 28 the Pittsburgh Penguins announced that they had acquired 16-year veteran and Calgary Flames captain Jarome Iginla in exchange for Ben Hanowski, Kenny Agostino and a 2013 first-round draft pick after Iginla also waived his no-trade clause to play for the Penguins. That evening the Penguins went on to defeat the Winnipeg Jets 4–0 which featured Evgeni Malkin making his return to the lineup after missing nine games and goaltender Tomas Vokoun recording his 50th career shutout extending the Penguins winning streak to 14 games. Jarome Iginla filled an immigration petition and was approved to join the team on March 29 in time to be added to the starting line-up against the New York Islanders. The Penguins went on to defeat the Islanders extending the winning streak to 15 games and became the first team in league history to have a perfect record over a calendar month. The Penguins also set a franchise record for longest shutout streak of 208:24 minutes and Vokoun setting a personal and Penguins record for an individual shutout streak with 162:42 minutes. The win came with a price after 50 seconds into his first shift, Sidney Crosby left the game after a shot from Brooks Orpik was deflected and re-directed into his mouth. The next day, head coach Dan Bylsma announced that Sidney Crosby needed to have oral surgery as a result of the injury and was out indefinitely with a broken jaw. Defenseman Paul Martin also underwent surgery on a broken bone in his hand and is projected to miss 4–6 weeks.

=== April ===
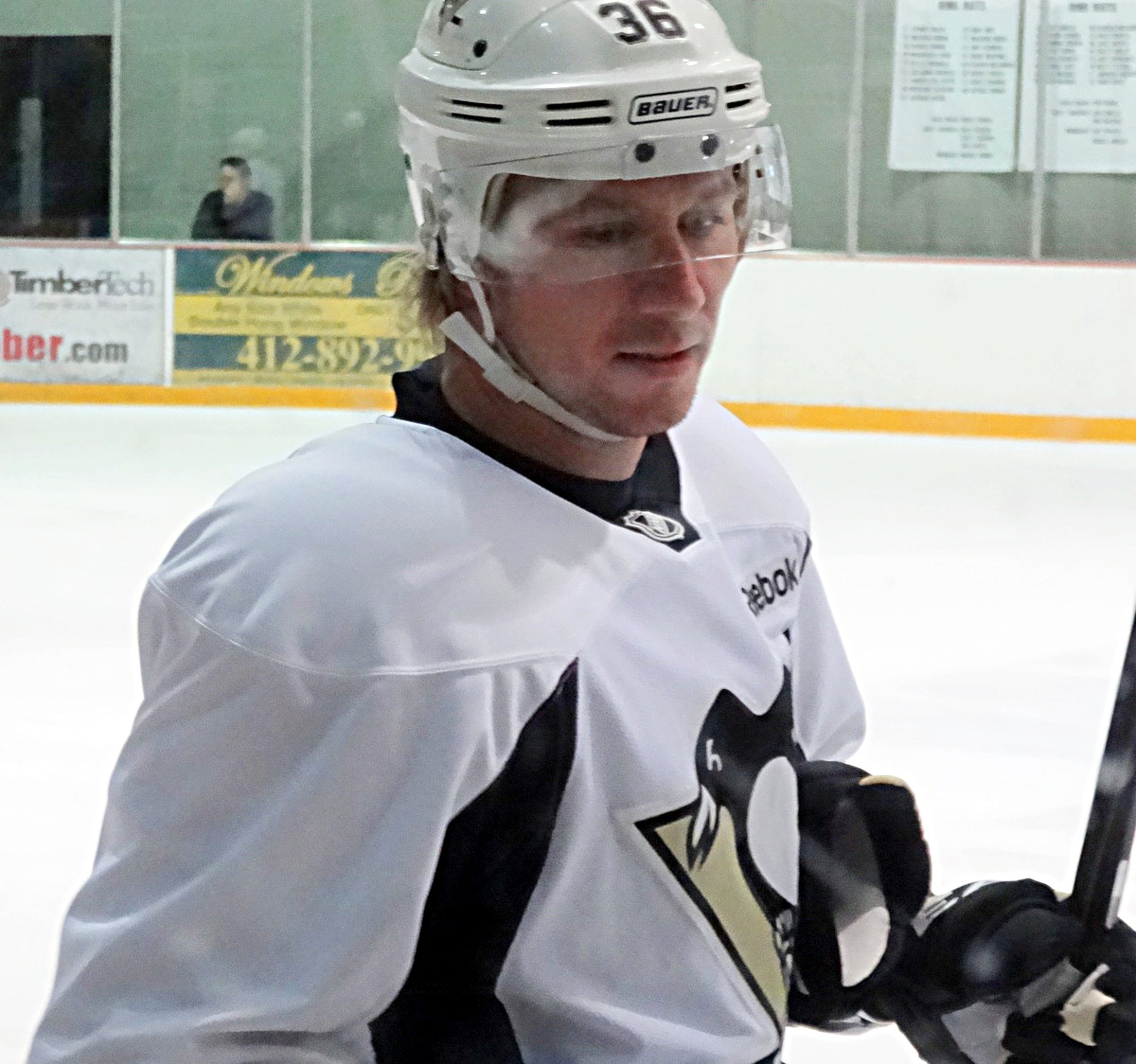
Jussi Jokinen made his Penguin debut on March 5, 2013 scoring the game-tying and game-winning goals.

The Penguins history-making streak came to an end Tuesday night, April 2, 2013, at the hands of the Buffalo Sabres. The team honored Brooks Orpik who played his 622nd game as a Penguin the most games played ever in franchise history by a defenseman. On the day of the NHL trade deadline, April 3, 2013, the Pittsburgh Penguins acquired forward Jussi Jokinen from the Carolina Hurricanes in exchange for a conditional sixth or seventh round draft pick in 2013 with Carolina retaining a portion of Jokinen's salary. The Penguins that night went on to drop the second game in a row losing against the New York Rangers. The next game the Penguins beat the Rangers in a game which featured Jussi Jokinen making his Penguin debut and scoring the game-tying and game-winning goal in a shootout. James Neal left the game halfway through the third period after Rangers defenseman Michael Del Zotto turned and caught Neal with an elbow up high and did not return the rest of the game. Neal was later diagnosed with a concussion and would miss the upcoming road-trip with no timetable for his return given while Kris Letang, who missed the last five games, was cleared for team practice. The Penguins defeated the Carolina Hurricanes the next night, 5–3, securing themselves a playoff position. Kris Letang returned to the lineup the next game and defenseman Tanner Glass scored his first goal as a Penguin helping the Penguins defeat the Tampa Bay Lightning 6–3. Evgeni Malkin missed the next game against the Florida Panthers and was later classified as day-to-day due to an upper-body injury. The next game against the Montreal Canadiens, defenseman Douglas Murray scored a goal which ended the longest goalless streak in the NHL of 146 games helping the Penguins defeat the Canadiens 6–4.

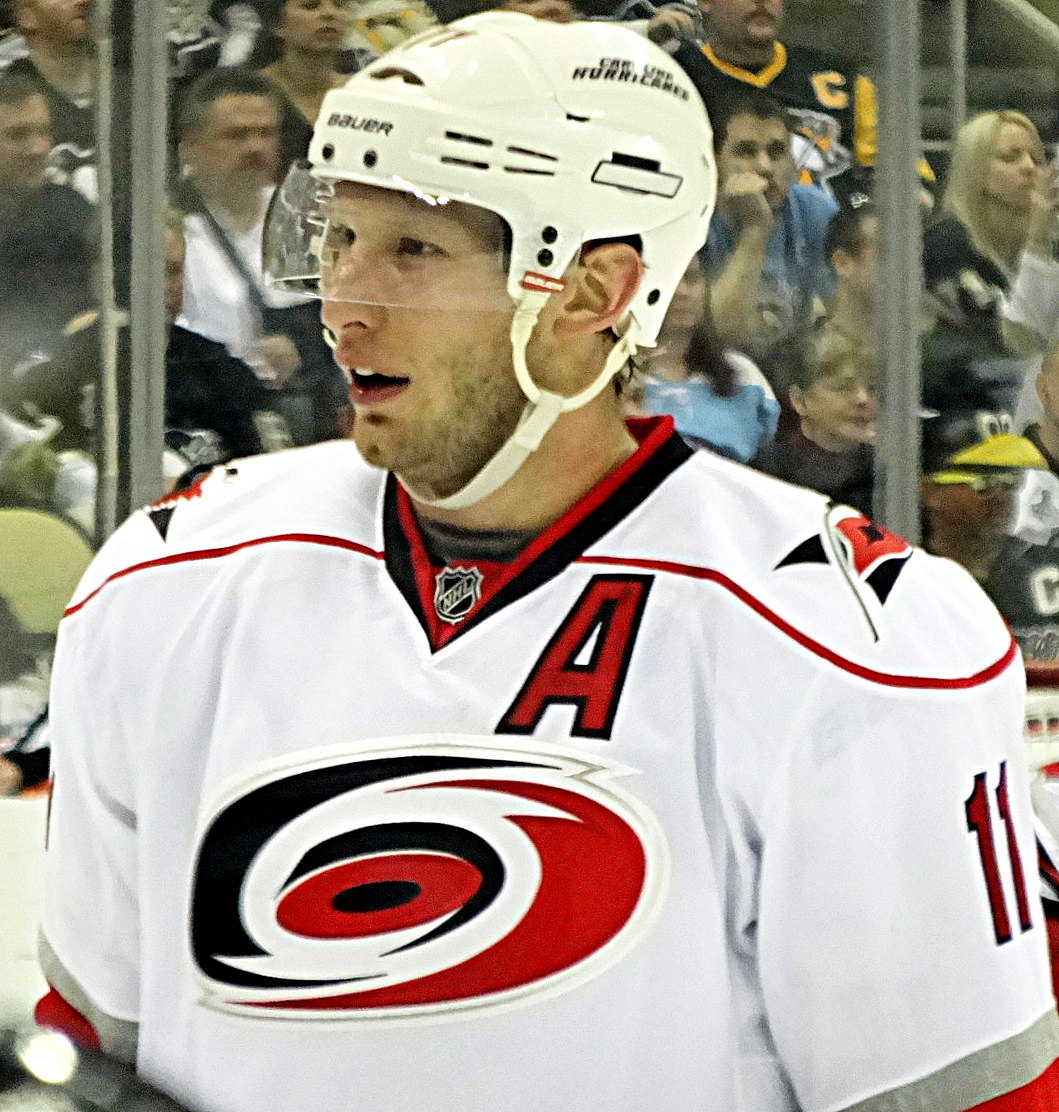
Jordan Staal as a Hurricane made his return to Pittsburgh on April 27, 2013.

The game scheduled against the Boston Bruins on April 19, 2013 was postponed to April 20, 2013 due to the city of Boston being placed in a state of lock-down while authorities searched the areas for the suspects from the Boston Marathon bombing. The game originally scheduled on April 20, 2013 against the Buffalo Sabres was moved to April 23, 2013 with all tickets for the original game being honored for the rescheduled game. The Penguins went to defeat the Boston Bruins and solidified their spot as the number one seed in the Eastern Conference. The Penguins honored the lives lost and the town of Boston by wearing a special patch on their jerseys with the outline of Boston's downtown with an American flag in the background and the numbers "617" – which is the Boston area code. After the game the jerseys were auctioned off with the proceeds being donated to "The One Fund Boston". The Penguins next win over that Ottawa Senators featured Tomas Vokoun reach his 300th career win in his 700th career game and Dan Bylsma became the fastest coach in NHL history to reach 200 wins (316 games). Evgeni Malkin returned to the line up after missing the last four games but failed to defeat the Buffalo Sabres. Brooks Orpik also left the game after the first period and did not return from a lower-body injury. The Penguins then went on to lose a their last regular season away game against the New Jersey Devils 3–2. The Penguins finished off the last game of the regular season with a home game against the Carolina Hurricanes which featured the return of Jordan Staal to the city of Pittsburgh. In the game's first television timeout, a highlight reel containing some of Staal's best moments as a Penguin aired on the jumbotron. After the video package ended, Staal received a standing ovation. The Penguins defeated the Hurrincanes 8–3.

The Penguins led the League in scoring for the second consecutive year, scoring 162 goals overall (excluding 3 shootout-winning goals). The Penguins also scored at least one goal in all of their 48 regular-season games.

== Schedule and results ==
2012–13 schedule
January: 4–3–0 (Home: 0–2–0; Road: 4–1–0), 8 Points

#	Jan	Time (ET)	Visitor	Score	Home	Location/Attendance	Record	Points
1	19	3:00 pm	Pittsburgh Penguins	3–1	Philadelphia Flyers	Wells Fargo Center (19,994)	1–0–0	2
2	20	7:00 pm	Pittsburgh Penguins	6–3	New York Rangers	Madison Square Garden (17,200)	2–0–0	4
3	23	7:00 pm	Toronto Maple Leafs	5–2	Pittsburgh Penguins	Consol Energy Center (18,641)	2–1–0	4
4	25	8:00 pm	Pittsburgh Penguins	2–4	Winnipeg Jets	MTS Centre (15,004)	2–2–0	4
5	27	5:00 pm	Pittsburgh Penguins	2–1 SO	Ottawa Senators	Scotiabank Place (20,081)	3–2–0	6
6	29	7:30 pm	New York Islanders	4–1	Pittsburgh Penguins	Consol Energy Center (18,657)	3–3–0	6
7	31	7:00 pm	Pittsburgh Penguins	3–0	New York Rangers	Madison Square Garden (17,200)	4–3–0	8

February: 9–5–0 (Home: 5–2–0; Road: 4–3–0), 18 Points

#	Feb	Time (ET)	Visitor	Score	Home	Location/Attendance	Record	Points
8	2	1:00 pm	New Jersey Devils	1–5	Pittsburgh Penguins	Consol Energy Center (18,635)	5–3–0	10
9	3	12:30 pm	Pittsburgh Penguins	6–3	Washington Capitals	Verizon Center (18,506)	6–3–0	12
10	5	7:00 pm	Pittsburgh Penguins	4–2	New York Islanders	Nassau Coliseum (11,318)	7–3–0	14
11	7	7:00 pm	Washington Capitals	2–5	Pittsburgh Penguins	Consol Energy Center (18,650)	8–3–0	16
12	9	1:00 pm	Pittsburgh Penguins	1–3	New Jersey Devils	Prudential Center (17,625)	8–4–0	16
13	10^{[A]}	7:30 pm	New Jersey Devils	3–1	Pittsburgh Penguins	Consol Energy Center (18,658)	8–5–0	16
14	13	7:00 pm	Ottawa Senators	2–4	Pittsburgh Penguins	Consol Energy Center (18,637)	9–5–0	18
15	15	7:00 pm	Pittsburgh Penguins	3–1	Winnipeg Jets	MTS Centre (15,004)	10–5–0	20
16	17	12:30 pm	Pittsburgh Penguins	4–3	Buffalo Sabres	First Niagara Center (19,070)	11–5–0	22
17	20	7:30 pm	Philadelphia Flyers	6–5	Pittsburgh Penguins	Consol Energy Center (18,650)	11–6–0	22
18	22^{[A]}	7:00 pm	Florida Panthers	1–3	Pittsburgh Penguins	Consol Energy Center (18,655)	12–6–0	24
19	24^{[A]}	7:30 pm	Tampa Bay Lightning	3–5	Pittsburgh Penguins	Consol Energy Center (18,632)	13–6–0	26
20	26	7:30 pm	Pittsburgh Penguins	4–6	Florida Panthers	BB&T Center (17,378)	13–7–0	26
21	28	7:00 pm	Pittsburgh Penguins	1–4	Carolina Hurricanes	PNC Arena (18,680)	13–8–0	26

March: 15–0–0 (Home: 10–0–0; Road: 5–0–0), 30 Points

#	Mar	Time (ET)	Visitor	Score	Home	Location/Attendance	Record	Points
22	2	7:00 pm	Pittsburgh Penguins	7–6 OT	Montreal Canadiens	Bell Centre (21,273)	14–8–0	28
23	4	7:30 pm	Tampa Bay Lightning	3–4	Pittsburgh Penguins	Consol Energy Center (18,656)	15–8–0	30
24	7	7:00 pm	Pittsburgh Penguins	5–4	Philadelphia Flyers	Wells Fargo Center (19,997)	16–8–0	32
25	9	7:00 pm	Pittsburgh Penguins	5–4 SO	Toronto Maple Leafs	Air Canada Centre (19,418)	17–8–0	34
26	10	7:00 pm	New York Islanders	1–6	Pittsburgh Penguins	Consol Energy Center (18,634)	18–8–0	36
27	12	7:30 pm	Boston Bruins	2–3	Pittsburgh Penguins	Consol Energy Center (18,640)	19–8–0	38
28	14	7:00 pm	Pittsburgh Penguins	3–1	Toronto Maple Leafs	Air Canada Centre (19,561)	20–8–0	40
29	16	1:00 pm	New York Rangers	0–3	Pittsburgh Penguins	Consol Energy Center (18,658)	21–8–0	42
30	17	12:30 pm	Boston Bruins	1–2	Pittsburgh Penguins	Consol Energy Center (18,659)	22–8–0	44
31	19	7:30 pm	Washington Capitals	1–2	Pittsburgh Penguins	Consol Energy Center (18,653)	23–8–0	46
32	22	7:00 pm	Pittsburgh Penguins	4–2	New York Islanders	Nassau Coliseum (14,888)	24–8–0	48
33	24^{[A]}	7:30 pm	Philadelphia Flyers	1–2 OT	Pittsburgh Penguins	Consol Energy Center (18,662)	25–8–0	50
34	26	7:00 pm	Montreal Canadiens	0–1	Pittsburgh Penguins	Consol Energy Center (18,646)	26–8–0	52
35	28	7:00 pm	Winnipeg Jets	0–4	Pittsburgh Penguins	Consol Energy Center (18,649)	27–8–0	54
36	30^{[A]}	1:00 pm	New York Islanders	0–2	Pittsburgh Penguins	Consol Energy Center (18,673)	28–8–0	56

April: 8–4–0 (Home: 3–2–0; Road: 5–2–0), 16 Points

#	Apr	Time (ET)	Visitor	Score	Home	Location/Attendance	Record	Points
37	2^{[A]}	7:30 pm	Buffalo Sabres	4–1	Pittsburgh Penguins	Consol Energy Center (18,642)	28–9–0	56
38	3	7:30 pm	Pittsburgh Penguins	1–6	New York Rangers	Madison Square Garden (17,200)	28–10–0	56
39	5	7:00 pm	New York Rangers	1–2 SO	Pittsburgh Penguins	Consol Energy Center (18,659)	29–10–0	58
40	9	7:00 pm	Pittsburgh Penguins	5–3	Carolina Hurricanes	PNC Arena (17,168)	30–10–0	60
41	11	7:30 pm	Pittsburgh Penguins	6–3	Tampa Bay Lightning	Tampa Bay Times Forum (19,204)	31–10–0	62
42	13	7:30 pm	Pittsburgh Penguins	3–1	Florida Panthers	BB&T Center (18,891)	32–10–0	64
43	17	7:00 pm	Montreal Canadiens	4–6	Pittsburgh Penguins	Consol Energy Center (18,626)	33–10–0	66
–	19	7:00 pm	Game against Boston rescheduled to April 20 due to manhunt for Boston Marathon bombing suspect.					
44	20	12:30 pm	Pittsburgh Penguins	3–2	Boston Bruins	TD Garden (17,565)	34–10–0	68
–	20	7:00 pm	Game against Buffalo rescheduled to April 23 due to Bruins game being rescheduled to April 20.					
45	22	7:30 pm	Pittsburgh Penguins	3–1	Ottawa Senators	Scotiabank Place (20,276)	35–10–0	70
46	23	7:30 pm	Buffalo Sabres	4–2	Pittsburgh Penguins	Consol Energy Center (18,630)	35–11–0	70
47	25	7:00 pm	Pittsburgh Penguins	2–3	New Jersey Devils	Prudential Center (16,122)	35–12–0	70
48	27	7:00 pm	Carolina Hurricanes	3–8	Pittsburgh Penguins	Consol Energy Center (18,658)	36–12–0	72

Legend: = Win = Loss = OT/SO Loss
^{A} Alternate Jersey

=== Season standings ===
Atlantic Division
Pos	Team	GP	W	L	OTL	ROW	GF	GA	GD	Pts
1	Pittsburgh Penguins	48	36	12	0	33	165	119	+46	72
2	New York Rangers	48	26	18	4	22	130	112	+18	56
3	New York Islanders	48	24	17	7	20	139	139	0	55
4	Philadelphia Flyers	48	23	22	3	22	133	141	−8	49
5	New Jersey Devils	48	19	19	10	17	112	129	−17	48

Source: National Hockey League

Eastern Conference
Pos	Div	Team	GP	W	L	OTL	ROW	GF	GA	GD	Pts
1	AT	z – Pittsburgh Penguins	48	36	12	0	33	165	119	+46	72
2	NE	y – Montreal Canadiens	48	29	14	5	26	149	126	+23	63
3	SE	y – Washington Capitals	48	27	18	3	24	149	130	+19	57
4	NE	x – Boston Bruins	48	28	14	6	24	131	109	+22	62
5	NE	x – Toronto Maple Leafs	48	26	17	5	26	145	133	+12	57
6	AT	x – New York Rangers	48	26	18	4	22	130	112	+18	56
7	NE	x – Ottawa Senators	48	25	17	6	21	116	104	+12	56
8	AT	x – New York Islanders	48	24	17	7	20	139	139	0	55
9	SE	Winnipeg Jets	48	24	21	3	22	128	144	−16	51
10	AT	Philadelphia Flyers	48	23	22	3	22	133	141	−8	49
11	AT	New Jersey Devils	48	19	19	10	17	112	129	−17	48
12	NE	Buffalo Sabres	48	21	21	6	14	115	143	−28	48
13	SE	Carolina Hurricanes	48	19	25	4	18	128	160	−32	42
14	SE	Tampa Bay Lightning	48	18	26	4	17	148	150	−2	40
15	SE	Florida Panthers	48	15	27	6	12	112	171	−59	36

Source: National Hockey League
x – Clinched playoff spot; y – Clinched division; z – Clinched conference

=== Detailed records ===
Final

Eastern Conference
Atlantic	GP	W	L	OT	SHOTS	GF	GA	PP	PK	FO W–L
Pittsburgh Penguins										
New York Rangers	5	4	1	0	149–159	15	10	4–18	4–16	147–162
New York Islanders	5	4	1	0	144–152	17	9	3–14	2–18	174–123
Philadelphia Flyers	4	3	1	0	116–119	15	12	6–16	4–16	125–109
New Jersey Devils	4	1	3	0	97–99	9	10	3–15	4–16	125–94
Division Total	18	12	6	0	506–529	56	41	16–63	14–66	571–488

Northeast	GP	W	L	OT	SHOTS	GF	GA	PP	PK	FO W–L
Montreal Canadiens	3	3	0	0	90–111	14	10	3–11	0–8	88–101
Boston Bruins	3	3	0	0	76–88	8	5	2–11	2–8	80–102
Toronto Maple Leafs	3	2	1	0	99–79	10	10	1–12	3–14	96–98
Ottawa Senators	3	3	0	0	88–96	9	4	1–15	1–12	99–88
Buffalo Sabres	3	1	2	0	97–95	7	11	3–11	1–9	91–90
Division Total	15	12	3	0	450–469	48	40	10–60	7–51	454–479

Southeast	GP	W	L	OT	SHOTS	GF	GA	PP	PK	FO W–L
Washington Capitals	3	3	0	0	90–78	13	6	6–10	3–11	100–94
Winnipeg Jets	3	2	1	0	106–78	9	5	1–4	1–8	90–72
Carolina Hurricanes	3	2	1	0	95–87	14	10	2–10	1–11	98–88
Tampa Bay Lightning	3	3	0	0	95–77	15	9	4–11	4–7	89–104
Florida Panthers	3	2	1	0	96–85	10	8	3–12	4–13	87–79
Division Total	15	12	3	0	482–405	61	38	16–47	13–50	464–437
Conference/NHL Total	48	36	12	0	1438–1403	165	119	42–170	34–167	1489–1404

=== Injuries ===
Player	Injury	Date	Returned	Games missed
Matt Niskanen	Lower-body-injury (ankle)	January 29, 2013	February 13, 2013	8 games
Kris Letang	Lower-body-injury	February 7, 2013	February 13, 2013	3 games
Evgeni Malkin	Concussion-like symptoms	February 22, 2013	March 4, 2013	4 games
Paul Martin	Lower-body-injury	March 1, 2013	March 7, 2013	2 games
Evgeni Malkin	Upper-body-injury	March 10, 2013	March 28, 2013	9 games
Kris Letang	Lower-body-injury	March 18, 2013	March 26, 2013	3 games
Tyler Kennedy	Illness	March 22, 2013	March 24, 2013	1 game
Marc-Andre Fleury	Undisclosed	March 26, 2013	March 30, 2013	1 game
Kris Letang	Lower-body-injury	March 27, 2013	April 11, 2013	6 games
Sidney Crosby	Fractured jaw	March 31, 2013	–	12 games
Paul Martin	Upper-body-injury (broken hand)	March 31, 2013	April 27, 2013	11 games
James Neal	Concussion	April 8, 2013	April 27, 2013	8 games
Evgeni Malkin	Upper-body-injury	April 13, 2013	April 23, 2013	5 games
Beau Bennett	Upper-body-injury	April 22, 2013	April 23, 2013	1 game
Kris Letang	Food poisoning	April 22, 2013	April 23, 2013	1 game
Marc-Andre Fleury	Personal	April 22, 2013	April 23, 2013	1 game
Brooks Orpik	Lower-body-injury	April 25, 2013	–	2 games
Joe Vitale	Lower-body-injury	April 25, 2013	–	2 games
Total				80 games

== Stanley Cup playoffs ==
=== Eastern Conference Quarterfinals ===
The Penguins started the 2013 Stanley Cup playoffs in the first seed of the Eastern Conference facing the #8 seed the New York Islanders. The Penguins defeated the Islanders four games out of five that they faced each other during the regular season, outscoring the Islanders 17–9. The Penguins dominated Game 1 with a score of 5–0 which marked Marc-Andre Fleury's sixth career playoff shutout tying a franchise record and rookie Beau Bennett's first career postseason goal on the first shift of his first game. Sidney Crosby made his return in Game 2 after missing the past 13 games (12 regular season, one playoff) but after taking an early lead the Penguins lost Game 2, 3–4. The Penguins went on to win Game 3 at the 8:44 mark of overtime when Chris Kunitz scored a power-play goal defeating the Islanders 5–4. James Neal opened the scoring in Game 3 after missing the last two games with a lower-body injury but the Penguins lost 6–4 with the Islanders tying the series at two games apiece. Tomas Vokoun replaced Marc-Andre Fleury for Game 5 and also saw the return of Tyler Kennedy and Joe Vitale with Kennedy scoring the game-winning goal in a 4–0 shutout victory taking the lead in the series. Game 6 saw the Penguins behind 3–2 towards the end of regulation when Paul Martin tied the game with 5:17 left in regulation. Unlikely hero, Brooks Orpik scored his first career playoff goal in 78 playoff games defeating the Islanders 4–3 and advancing the Penguins onto the Eastern Conference Semi-finals.

=== Eastern Conference Semi-finals ===
The Penguins opened the Semi-finals against the seventh-seeded the Ottawa Senators, a team that the Penguins defeated in all three meetings during the regular season, outscoring them 9–4. The Penguins defeated the Senators in Game 1, 4–1, in a physical game that saw a total of 66 hits (40 Penguins, 26 Senators). The Penguins chased goaltender Craig Anderson just 1:15 into the second period of Game 2 after Sidney Crosby's slap shot beat Anderson, with Crosby becoming just the second Penguins player other than Mario Lemieux to notch multiple post-season hat-tricks. With less than a minute to play in regulation of Game 3 and the Penguins on a power-play, the Senators pulled their goaltender for the extra attacker, where captain Daniel Alfredsson scored a shorthanded goal to tie the game with 28.6 seconds left. Game 3 went into double-overtime and 7:39 minutes into the second overtime period, Colin Greening scored on a rebound to give the Senators a 2–1 victory, bringing the series to 2–1. Jarome Iginla and James Neal both scored two goals apiece in Game 4, with the Penguins defeating the Senators 7–3, pushing the Senators to the risk of elimination and bringing the series to a 3–1 score. James Neal added three more goals in Game 5 to record his first career playoff hat-trick, and his fifth goal in the last six periods, eliminating the Senators with a 6–2 win and advancing the Penguins to the Conference Finals. The Penguins outscored the Senators 22–11 and defeated Craig Anderson, who finished the regular season with a 1.69 GAA and a 0.941 save percentage over 24 games but finished the playoffs with a 3.01 GAA and a 0.918 save percentage over ten games total and allowed 20 goals over the five games against the Penguins.

=== Eastern Conference Finals ===
The Penguins faced the fourth-seeded Boston Bruins in the Conference Finals, the fifth time the two franchises faced off in a playoff series, and the third time in the Eastern Conference Finals. Their most recent meeting was in the 1992 Wales Conference Finals, where Pittsburgh swept the Bruins out of the playoffs. The Penguins had won all three games in this year's regular season series, all three games by one goal. The Pittsburgh Penguins had made it to their third Conference Finals since 2008, while the Boston Bruins were making their second appearance in three years.

The Bruins swept the top seeded Penguins, as Boston goaltender Tuukka Rask recorded his first two career playoff shutouts and only allowed two Pittsburgh goals in the entire series. Penguin stars Evgeni Malkin, Sidney Crosby and the newly acquired Jarome Iginla were held to zero combined points during the series. David Krejci had two goals in the Bruins' 3–0 Game 1 victory, the Bruins recorded six goals in a 6–1 rout in Game 2, Patrice Bergeron scored at 15:19 of the second overtime period of Game 3 to give Boston a 2–1 win, and in Game 4, Adam McQuaid scored the lone goal to give the Bruins a 1–0 win and a trip to the Stanley Cup Finals. This series marked the first time since 1979 that the Penguins were swept in a playoff series; notably, it was the same Bruins franchise that swept the Penguins that year.

=== Playoff log ===
2013 Stanley Cup playoffs
Eastern Conference Quarterfinals vs No. 8 New York Islanders: Pittsburgh wins 4–2 (Home: 2–1; Road: 2–1)

#	Date	Time (ET)	Visitor	Score	Home	OT	Pittsburgh goals	Opponent goals	Decision	Location/Attendance	Series
1	May 1	7:30 pm	New York Islanders	0–5	Pittsburgh Penguins		**Bennett**, Dupuis, Letang, Dupuis, Glass	None	Fleury (1–0)	Consol Energy Center (18,612)	Pit leads 1–0
2	May 3	7:00 pm	New York Islanders	4–3	Pittsburgh Penguins		Malkin, Crosby, Crosby	Moulson, McDonald, Martin, **Okposo**	Nabokov (1–1)	Consol Energy Center (18,624)	Series Tied 1–1
3	May 5	12:00 pm	Pittsburgh Penguins	5–4	New York Islanders	OT	Iginla, Kunitz, Dupuis, Murray, **Kunitz**	Moulson, Cizikas, Okposo, Tavares	Fleury (2–1)	Nassau Veterans Memorial Coliseum (16,170)	Pit leads 2–1
4	May 7	7:00 pm	Pittsburgh Penguins	4–6	New York Islanders		Neal, Malkin, Sutter, Dupuis	Strait, Streit, Okposo, Streit, **Tavares**, Cizikas	Nabokov (2–2)	Nassau Coliseum (16,170)	Series Tied 2–2
5	May 9	7:00 pm	New York Islanders	0–4	Pittsburgh Penguins		**Kennedy**, Murray, Crosby, Letang	None	Vokoun (1–0)	Consol Energy Center (18,636)	Pit leads 3–2
6	May 11	7:00 pm	Pittsburgh Penguins	4–3	New York Islanders	OT	Iginla, Dupuis, Martin, **Orpik**	Tavares, McDonald, Grabner	Vokoun (2–0)	Nassau Coliseum (16,170)	Pit Wins 4–2

Eastern Conference Semifinals vs No. 7 Ottawa Senators: Pittsburgh wins 4–1 (Home: 3–0; Road: 1–1)

#	Date	Time (ET)	Visitor	Score	Home	OT	Pittsburgh goals	Opponent goals	Decision	Location/Attendance	Series
1	May 14	7:30 pm	Ottawa Senators	1–4	Pittsburgh Penguins		Martin, **Malkin**, Kunitz, Dupuis	Greening	Vokoun (3–0)	Consol Energy Center (18,621)	Pit leads 1–0
2	May 17	7:30 pm	Ottawa Senators	3–4	Pittsburgh Penguins		Crosby, Crosby, Crosby, **Morrow**	Turris, Greening, Pageau	Vokoun (4–0)	Consol Energy Center (18,645)	Pit leads 2–0
3	May 19	7:30 pm	Pittsburgh Penguins	1–2	Ottawa Senators	2OT	Kennedy	Alfredsson, **Greening**	Anderson (5–2)	Scotiabank Place (20,500)	Pit leads 2–1
4	May 22	7:30 pm	Pittsburgh Penguins	7–3	Ottawa Senators		Neal, Kunitz, Iginla, **Neal**, Dupuis, Crosby, Iginla	Michalek, Turris, Alfredsson	Vokoun (5–1)	Scotiabank Place (20,500)	Pit leads 3–1
5	May 24	7:30 pm	Ottawa Senators	2–6	Pittsburgh Penguins		Morrow, Neal, **Letang**, Malkin, Neal, Neal	Michalek, Turris	Vokoun (6–1)	Consol Energy Center (18,656)	Pit Wins 4–1

Eastern Conference Finals vs No. 4 Boston Bruins: Boston wins 4–0 (Home: 0–2; Road: 0–2)

#	Date	Time (ET)	Visitor	Score	Home	OT	Pittsburgh goals	Opponent goals	Decision	Location/Attendance	Series
1	Jun 1	8:00 pm	Boston Bruins	3–0	Pittsburgh Penguins		None	**Krejci**, Krejci, Horton	Rask (9–4)	Consol Energy Center (18,628)	BOS leads 1–0
2	Jun 3	8:00 pm	Boston Bruins	6–1	Pittsburgh Penguins		Sutter	Marchand, **Horton**, Krejci, Marchand, Bergeron, Boychuk	Rask (10–4)	Consol Energy Center (18,619)	BOS leads 2–0
3	Jun 5	8:00 pm	Pittsburgh Penguins	1–2	Boston Bruins	2OT	Kunitz	Krejci, **Bergeron**	Rask (11–4)	TD Garden (17,565)	BOS leads 3–0
4	Jun 7	8:00 pm	Pittsburgh Penguins	0–1	Boston Bruins		None	**McQuaid**	Rask (12–4)	TD Garden (17,565)	BOS wins 4–0

Legend: = Win = Loss = Playoff series win Bold = Game Winning Goal

=== Injuries ===
Player	Injury	Date	Returned	Games missed
Sidney Crosby	Fractured jaw	**From season**	May 3, 2013	1 game
Brooks Orpik	Lower-body-injury	**From season**	May 7, 2013	3 games
Joe Vitale	Lower-body-injury	**From season**	April 29, 2013	0 games
James Neal	Lower-body-injury (right ankle sprain)	May 3, 2013	May 7, 2013	1 game
Joe Vitale	Undisclosed	May 19, 2013	June 3, 2013	4 games
Brenden Morrow	Undisclosed	May 22, 2013	May 24, 2013	1 game
**Total**				**10 games**

== Player statistics ==
Skaters

Regular season
Player	GP	G	A	Pts	+/−	PIM
Sidney Crosby	36	15	41	56	26	16
Chris Kunitz	48	22	30	52	30	39
Pascal Dupuis	48	20	18	38	31	26
Kris Letang	35	5	33	38	16	8
James Neal	40	21	15	36	5	26
Evgeni Malkin	31	9	24	33	5	36
Paul Martin	34	6	17	23	14	16
Matt Cooke	48	8	13	21	-2	36
Brandon Sutter	48	11	8	19	3	4
Brenden Morrow^{†}	15	6	8	14	5	19
Matt Niskanen	40	4	10	14	4	12
Beau Bennett	26	3	11	14	7	6
Jussi Jokinen^{†}	10	7	4	11	3	6
Tyler Kennedy	46	6	5	11	-6	19
Jarome Iginla^{†}	13	5	6	11	2	9
Craig Adams	48	3	6	9	-1	28
Brooks Orpik	46	0	8	8	17	32
Simon Despres	33	2	5	7	9	20
Dustin Jeffrey	24	3	3	6	1	2
Deryk Engelland	42	0	6	6	5	54
Joe Vitale	33	2	3	5	-7	17
Robert Bortuzzo	15	2	2	4	3	27
Douglas Murray^{†}	14	1	2	3	-1	9
Tanner Glass	48	1	1	2	-11	62
Mark Eaton	23	0	0	0	9	4
Dylan Reese	3	0	0	0	0	0
Steve MacIntyre	1	0	0	0	0	12
Ben Lovejoy	3	0	0	0	-2	0
Trevor Smith	1	0	0	0	0	0
Eric Tangradi	5	0	0	0	2	0
Zach Boychuk	7	0	0	0	-2	2
Total		162	279	441	—	547

Playoffs
Player	GP	G	A	Pts	+/−	PIM
Evgeni Malkin	15	4	12	16	-2	26
Kris Letang	15	3	13	16	2	8
Sidney Crosby	14	7	8	15	-3	8
Jarome Iginla	15	4	8	12	-4	16
Pascal Dupuis	15	7	4	11	2	12
Paul Martin	15	2	9	11	5	4
James Neal	13	6	4	10	-3	8
Chris Kunitz	15	5	5	10	-1	6
Tyler Kennedy	9	2	3	5	6	2
Brenden Morrow	14	2	2	4	-2	8
Matt Cooke	15	0	4	4	1	35
Douglas Murray	15	2	1	3	-3	32
Brandon Sutter	15	2	1	3	-1	0
Mark Eaton	8	0	3	3	2	0
Jussi Jokinen	8	0	3	3	3	4
Brooks Orpik	12	1	1	2	2	10
Matt Niskanen	15	0	2	2	-4	11
Tanner Glass	5	1	0	1	0	4
Beau Bennett	6	1	0	1	2	0
Craig Adams	15	0	1	1	1	10
Joe Vitale	6	0	1	1	-1	6
Deryk Engelland	7	0	0	0	-6	8
Simon Despres	3	0	0	0	0	0
Total		49	85	134	—	218

Goaltenders

Regular season
Player	GP	GS	TOI	W	L	OT	GA	GAA	SA	SV%	SO	G	A	PIM
Marc-Andre Fleury	33	31	1857:45	23	8	0	74	2.39	881	0.916	1	0	2	2
Tomas Vokoun	20	17	1028:32	13	4	0	42	2.45	519	0.919	3	0	2	2
Total		48	2886:17	36	12	0	116	2.41	1400	0.917	4	0	4	4

Playoffs
Player	GP	GS	TOI	W	L	OT	GA	GAA	SA	SV%	SO	G	A	PIM
Tomas Vokoun	11	11	685:13	6	5	--	23	2.01	345	0.933	1	0	0	0
Marc-Andre Fleury	5	4	290:14	2	2	--	17	3.51	145	0.883	1	0	1	0
Total		15	975:27	8	7	0	40	2.46	490	0.918	2	0	1	0

^{†}Denotes player spent time with another team before joining the Penguins. Stats reflect time with the Penguins only.
^{‡}Denotes player was traded mid-season. Stats reflect time with the Penguins only.

== Notable achievements ==
=== Awards ===
Regular season
Player	Award	Awarded
C. Kunitz	NHL Second Star of the Week	February 4, 2013
S. Crosby	NHL Second Star of February	March 1, 2013
S. Crosby	NHL Second Star of the Week	March 11, 2013
S. Crosby	NHL First Star of March	April 1, 2013

Playoffs/Post–season
Player	Award	Awarded
K. Letang	Norris Trophy Finalist	May 7, 2013
S. Crosby	Ted Lindsay Award Finalist	May 9, 2013
S. Crosby	Hart Memorial Trophy Finalist	May 10, 2013
R. Shero	GM of the Year Award Finalist	May 13, 2013
S. Crosby	Masterton Memorial Trophy Finalist	May 14, 2013
R. Shero	GM of the Year Award Winner	June 14, 2013
S. Crosby	Ted Lindsay Award Winner	June 15, 2013

=== Team awards ===
Awarded on April 24, 2013

Player	Award	Notes
Matt Niskanen	Baz Bastien Memorial Award	Presented by the Pittsburgh Chapter of the Professional Hockey Writers Association to the player who the local media of the PHWA want to acknowledge for his cooperation throughout the year. The award is presented in memory of the late Aldege "Baz" Bastien, Penguins general manager from 1976 to 1983. Sponsor: UPMC
Sidney Crosby	Bill Masterton Memorial Trophy nominee	The Pittsburgh Chapter of the Professional Hockey Writers Association votes for the Penguins' Masterton nominee. Each NHL team selects a Masterton candidate from which the overall winner is chosen. The Masterton candidate is nominated as the player who best exemplifies the qualities of perseverance, sportsmanship and dedication to hockey. Sponsor: Trib Total Media
Sidney Crosby; Marc-Andre Fleury	A. T. Caggiano Memorial Booster Club Cup	Presented in memory of A.T. Caggiano, long-time Penguins' locker room attendant & Booster Club supporter, the award is presented by Penguins Booster Club members, who vote for the three stars after every home game and tally votes at the end of the regular season.
Simon Despres	Rookie of the Year Award	Presented in memory of former Penguins forward Michel Briere to the player who makes a substantial contribution during his rookie season. Sponsor: Highmark
Brooks Orpik	Player's Player Award	The players hold a vote at the end of the season for the player they feel exemplifies leadership for the team, both on and off the ice, a player dedicated to teamwork. Sponsor: American Eagle Outfitters
Matt Cooke	Edward J. DeBartolo Award	The award recognizes the player who has donated a tremendous amount of time and effort during the season working on community and charity projects. Sponsor: Verizon Wireless
Paul Martin	Defensive Player of the Year	This award honors the defensive skills of an individual player on the team. Sponsor: PNC Wealth Management
Sidney Crosby	Most Valuable Player	Based on the overall contribution the player makes to the team. Sponsor: CONSOL Energy

=== Milestones ===
Regular season
Player	Milestone	Reached
M. Fleury	Franchise Wins Record	January 19, 2013
R. Bortuzzo	1st Career NHL Goal	February 2, 2013
R. Bortuzzo	1st Career NHL Point	February 2, 2013
R. Bortuzzo	1st Career NHL Assist	February 3, 2013
M. Cooke	900th Career NHL Game	February 10, 2013
S. Crosby	400th Career NHL Assist	February 13, 2013
B. Sutter	300th Career NHL Game	February 13, 2013
B. Bennett	1st Career NHL Game	February 15, 2013
B. Orpik	600th Career NHL Game	February 15, 2013
B. Bennett	1st Career NHL Goal	February 24, 2013
B. Bennett	1st Career NHL Point	February 24, 2013
M. Cooke	200th Career NHL Assist	February 24, 2013
B. Bennett	1st Career NHL Assist	February 26, 2013
J. Vitale	100th Career NHL Game	March 14, 2013
M. Fleury	Franchise Shutout Record	March 17, 2013
T. Vokoun	50th Career NHL Shutout	March 28, 2013
T. Glass	300th Career NHL Game	April 3, 2013
M. Niskanen	400th Career NHL Game	April 3, 2013
K. Letang	200th Career NHL Point	April 11, 2013
J. Iginla	1,100th Career NHL Point	April 17, 2013
T. Vokoun	700th Career NHL Game	April 22, 2013
T. Vokoun	300th Career NHL Win	April 22, 2013
D. Bylsma	200th Career NHL Win	April 22, 2013
P. Martin	200th Career NHL Assist	April 27, 2013

Playoffs
Player	Milestone	Reached
B. Bennett	1st Career NHL Playoff Game	May 1, 2013
B. Bennett	1st Career NHL Playoff Goal	May 1, 2013
B. Bennett	1st Career NHL Playoff Point	May 1, 2013
B. Sutter	1st Career NHL Playoff Game	May 1, 2013
T. Glass	1st Career NHL Playoff Goal	May 1, 2013
B. Orpik	1st Career NHL Playoff Goal	May 11, 2013
J. Vitale	1st Career NHL Playoff Point	May 11, 2013
S. Crosby	100th Career NHL Playoff Point	May 17, 2013

== Transactions ==
The Penguins have been involved in the following transactions during the 2012–13 season:

=== Trades ===
June 22, 2012	To Carolina Hurricanes: Jordan Staal	To Pittsburgh Penguins: Brandon Sutter; Brian Dumoulin; 1st-round pick in 2012
June 22, 2012	To Phoenix Coyotes: Zbynek Michalek	To Pittsburgh Penguins: Harrison Ruopp; Marc Cheverie; 3rd-round pick in 2012
January 24, 2013	To New York Rangers: Benn Ferriero	To Pittsburgh Penguins: Chad Kolarik
January 24, 2013	To Dallas Stars: Carl Sneep	To Pittsburgh Penguins: Conditional draft pick
February 6, 2013	To Anaheim Ducks: Ben Lovejoy	To Pittsburgh Penguins: 5th-round pick in 2014
February 13, 2013	To Winnipeg Jets: Eric Tangradi	To Pittsburgh Penguins: 7th-round pick in 2013
March 24, 2013	To Dallas Stars: Joe Morrow; 5th-round pick in 2013	To Pittsburgh Penguins: Brenden Morrow; 3rd-round pick in 2013
March 25, 2013	To San Jose Sharks: 2nd-round pick in 2013; Conditional 2nd-round pick in 2014 (Note: Condition not satisfied.)	To Pittsburgh Penguins: Douglas Murray
March 28, 2013	To Calgary Flames: Ben Hanowski; Kenny Agostino; 1st-round pick in 2013	To Pittsburgh Penguins: Jarome Iginla
April 3, 2013	To Carolina Hurricanes: Conditional 6th- or 7th-round pick in 2013 (Note: Condition not satisfied.)	To Pittsburgh Penguins: Jussi Jokinen
April 3, 2013	To Columbus Blue Jackets: Patrick Killeen	To Pittsburgh Penguins: Future considerations
June 24, 2013	To Anaheim Ducks: Alex Grant	To Pittsburgh Penguins: Harry Zolnierczyk

=== Free agents ===
Player	Acquired from	Lost to	Date	Contract terms
Jeff Zatkoff	Manchester Monarchs		July 1, 2012	2-year/$1.05 million^{[a]}
Riley Holzapfel	Syracuse Crunch		July 1, 2012	1 year/$525,000^{[a]}
Tanner Glass	Winnipeg Jets		July 1, 2012	2-year/$2.2 million
Dylan Reese	New York Islanders		July 1, 2012	1 year/$600,000^{[a]}
Warren Peters	Minnesota Wild		July 1, 2012	1 year/$600,000^{[a]}
Trevor Smith	Tampa Bay Lightning		July 1, 2012	1 year/$575,000^{[a]}
Arron Asham		New York Rangers	July 1, 2012	2-year/$2 million
Colin McDonald		New York Islanders	July 2, 2012	1 year/$700,000^{[a]}
Steve Sullivan		Phoenix Coyotes	July 4, 2012	1 year/$1.85 million
Philippe Dupuis	Toronto Maple Leafs		July 5, 2012	1 year/$600,000^{[a]}
Benn Ferriero	San Jose Sharks		July 13, 2012	1 year/$700,000^{[a]}
Cal O'Reilly		Metallurg Magnitogorsk	July 18, 2012	2-year
Ryan Craig		Springfield Falcons	July 19, 2012	1 year
Alexandre Picard		Lev Praha	July 25, 2012	undisclosed
Jayson Megna	University of Nebraska Omaha		August 1, 2012	2-year/$1.85 million^{[b]}
Richard Park		HC Ambri-Piotta	August 7, 2012	2-year
Boris Valabik		Kometa Brno	August 14, 2012	1 year
Scott Munroe		Adirondack Phantoms	August 23, 2012	1 year
Marc Cheverie		Binghamton Senators	September 6, 2012	1 year
Casey Pierro-Zabotel		Gwinnett Gladiators	September 27, 2012	undisclosed
Dylan Reese		Amur Khabarovsk	June 15, 2013	1 year
Philippe Dupuis		Hamburg Freezers	June 27, 2013	1 year
Chad Kolarik		Linkopings HC	June 28, 2013	2-year

=== Waivers ===
Player	Claimed from	Lost to	Date
Brian Strait		New York Islanders	January 18, 2013
Zach Boychuk	Carolina Hurricanes		January 31, 2013
Zach Boychuk		Nashville Predators	March 5, 2013
Tom Kostopoulos		New Jersey Devils	March 6, 2013

=== Signings ===
Player	Date	Contract terms
Brad Thiessen	June 30, 2012	1 year/$525,000^{[a]}
Matt Niskanen	June 30, 2012	2-year/$4.6 million
Sidney Crosby	July 1, 2012	12-year/$104.4 million (contract extension)
Steve MacIntyre	July 1, 2012	2-year/$1.25 million^{[a]}
Carl Sneep	July 11, 2012	1 year/$525,000^{[a]}
Keven Veilleux	July 11, 2012	1 year/$525,000^{[a]}
Robert Bortuzzo	August 30, 2012	1 year/$525,000^{[a]}
Alex Grant	August 30, 2012	1 year/$525,000^{[a]}
Brian Strait	August 30, 2012	1 year/$605,000^{[a]}
Eric Tangradi	August 30, 2012	1 year/$726,000^{[a]}
Olli Maatta	September 12, 2012	3-year/$2.775 million^{[b]}
Derrick Pouliot	September 12, 2012	3-year/$2.775 million^{[b]}
Mark Eaton	January 23, 2013	1 year/$725,000
Tom Kostopoulos	January 23, 2013	1 year/$600,000^{[a]}
Harrison Ruopp	April 4, 2013	3-year/$1.952 million^{[b]}
Eric Hartzell	April 14, 2013	1 year/$925,000^{[b]}
Anton Zlobin	April 24, 2013	3-year/$1.825 million^{[b]}
Nick D'Agostino	May 18, 2013	2-year/$1.250 million ^{[b]}
Evgeni Malkin	June 13, 2013	8-year/$76 million (contract extension)
Chris Kunitz	June 27, 2013	3-year/$11.55 million (contract extension)

=== Other ===
Name	Date	Contract terms
Dan Bylsma	June 12, 2013	2-year (contract extension)

Notes

- ^{a} – Two-way contract
- ^{b} – Entry-level contract

== Draft picks ==
Pittsburgh Penguins' picks at the 2012 NHL entry draft, held in Pittsburgh, Pennsylvania on June 22 & 23, 2012.

Round	#	Player	Pos	Nationality	College/Junior/Club team (League)
1	8^{[a]}	Derrick Pouliot	Defense	Canada	Portland Winterhawks (WHL)
1	22	Olli Maatta	Defense	Finland	London Knights (OHL)
2	52	Teddy Blueger	Center	Latvia	Shattuck-Saint Mary's (Midget AAA)
3	81^{[b]}	Oskar Sundqvist	Center	Sweden	Skelleftea AIK Jr. (J20 SuperElit)
3	83	Matt Murray	Goaltender	Canada	Sault Ste. Marie Greyhounds (OHL)
4	92^{[c]}	Matia Marcantuoni	Center/Right wing	Canada	Kitchener Rangers (OHL)
4	113	Sean Maguire	Goaltender	Canada	Powell River Kings (BCHL)
5	143	Clark Seymour	Defense	Canada	Peterborough Petes (OHL)
6	173	Anton Zlobin	Right wing	Russia	Shawinigan Cataractes (QMJHL)

Draft notes

- ^{a} The Carolina Hurricanes' first-round pick went to the Pittsburgh Penguins as a result of a June 22, 2012, trade that sent Jordan Staal to the Hurricanes in exchange for Brandon Sutter, Brian Dumoulin and this pick.
- ^{b} The Phoenix Coyotes' third-round pick (originally Philadelphia Flyers' pick) went to the Pittsburgh Penguins as a result of a June 22, 2012, trade that sent Zbynek Michalek to the Coyotes in exchange for Harrison Ruopp, Marc Cheverie and this pick.
- ^{c} The Columbus Blue Jackets' fourth-round pick went to the Pittsburgh Penguins as a result of a November 8, 2011, trade that sent Mark Letestu to the Blue Jackets in exchange for this pick.
- The Pittsburgh Penguins' seventh-round pick went to the Washington Capitals as the result of a June 4, 2012, trade that sent Tomas Vokoun to the Penguins in exchange for this pick.

== See also ==
- 2012–13 NHL season
- 2012–13 NHL transactions
