= List of 2012–13 NHL Three Star Awards =

The 2012–13 NHL Three Star Awards are the way the National Hockey League (NHL) denotes its players of the week and players of the month of the 2012–13 season.

== Weekly ==
Weekly
Week	First Star	Second Star	Third Star
January 27, 2013	Patrick Marleau (San Jose Sharks)	Corey Crawford (Chicago Blackhawks)	Martin St. Louis (Tampa Bay Lightning)
February 3, 2013	Thomas Vanek (Buffalo Sabres)	Chris Kunitz (Pittsburgh Penguins)	Roberto Luongo (Vancouver Canucks)
February 10, 2013	Patrick Kane (Chicago Blackhawks)	Jamie Benn (Dallas Stars)	Martin Brodeur (New Jersey Devils)
February 17, 2013	John Tavares (New York Islanders)	Viktor Fasth (Anaheim Ducks)	Jiri Tlusty (Carolina Hurricanes)
February 24, 2013	Jakub Voracek (Philadelphia Flyers)	Steven Stamkos (Tampa Bay Lightning)	Ben Bishop (Ottawa Senators)
March 3, 2013	Max Pacioretty (Montreal Canadiens)	Patrice Bergeron (Boston Bruins)	Niklas Backstrom (Minnesota Wild)
March 10, 2013	Sergei Bobrovsky (Columbus Blue Jackets)	Sidney Crosby (Pittsburgh Penguins)	Jeff Carter (Los Angeles Kings)
March 17, 2013	Chris Stewart (St. Louis Blues)	Kyle Turris (Ottawa Senators)	Sergei Bobrovsky (Columbus Blue Jackets)
March 24, 2013	Alexander Ovechkin (Washington Capitals)	Niklas Backstrom (Minnesota Wild)	Nazem Kadri (Toronto Maple Leafs)
March 31, 2013	Joffrey Lupul (Toronto Maple Leafs)	Antti Niemi (San Jose Sharks)	Taylor Hall (Edmonton Oilers)
April 7, 2013	Alexander Ovechkin (Washington Capitals)	Brian Elliott (St. Louis Blues)	Henrik Lundqvist (New York Rangers)
April 14, 2013	Sergei Bobrovsky (Columbus Blue Jackets)	Phil Kessel (Toronto Maple Leafs)	Richard Bachman (Dallas Stars)
April 21, 2013	Andrew Ladd (Winnipeg Jets)	Brad Richards (New York Rangers)	Logan Couture (San Jose Sharks)
April 28, 2013	Jimmy Howard (Detroit Red Wings)	Henrik Zetterberg (Detroit Red Wings)	Nail Yakupov (Edmonton Oilers)

== Monthly ==
Monthly
Month	First Star	Second Star	Third Star
January	Craig Anderson (Ottawa Senators)	Patrick Marleau (San Jose Sharks)	Thomas Vanek (Buffalo Sabres)
February	Steven Stamkos (Tampa Bay Lightning)	Sidney Crosby (Pittsburgh Penguins)	Ray Emery (Chicago Blackhawks)
March	Sidney Crosby (Pittsburgh Penguins)	P. K. Subban (Montreal Canadiens)	Sergei Bobrovsky (Columbus Blue Jackets)
April	Alexander Ovechkin (Washington Capitals)	Brian Elliott (St. Louis Blues)	Derek Stepan (New York Rangers)

== Rookie of the Month ==
Rookie of the Month
Month	Player
January	Vladimir Tarasenko (St. Louis Blues)
February	Jonathan Huberdeau (Florida Panthers)
March	Jake Muzzin (Los Angeles Kings)
April	Nail Yakupov (Edmonton Oilers)

== See also ==
- Three stars (ice hockey)
