= 2012–13 Winnipeg Jets season =

National Hockey League team season

2012–13 Winnipeg Jets
- Division: 2nd Southeast
- Conference: 9th Eastern
- 2012–13 record: 24–21–3
- Home record: 13–10–1
- Road record: 11–11–2
- Goals for: 128
- Goals against: 144

Team information
- General manager: Kevin Cheveldayoff
- Coach: Claude Noel
- Captain: Andrew Ladd
- Alternate captains: Olli Jokinen; Mark Stuart
- Arena: MTS Centre
- Average attendance: 15,004 (100%); Total: 360,096

Team leaders
- Goals: Blake Wheeler (19)
- Assists: Andrew Ladd (28)
- Points: Andrew Ladd (46)
- Penalty minutes: Evander Kane (80)
- Plus/minus: Andrew Ladd; Grant Clitsome (+10)
- Wins: Ondrej Pavelec (21)
- Goals against average: Ondrej Pavelec (2.91)

The 2012–13 Winnipeg Jets season was the 30th season of play for the National Hockey League (NHL) franchise that was established on June 22, 1979, and 38th season for the organization overall. The regular season was reduced from its usual 82 games to 48 due to a lockout.

The Jets finished four points short of a playoff spot, finishing 2nd in the Southeast Division (to Washington) that saw them lose the last two games of the season.

== Regular season ==
The Jets struggled on the power play during the regular season and finished 30th overall in power-play percentage at 14.09% (21 for 149).

=== Standings ===
Southeast Division
Pos	Team	GP	W	L	OTL	ROW	GF	GA	GD	Pts
1	y – Washington Capitals	48	27	18	3	24	149	126	+23	57
2	Winnipeg Jets	48	24	21	3	22	128	109	+19	51
3	Carolina Hurricanes	48	19	25	4	18	128	133	−5	42
4	Tampa Bay Lightning	48	18	26	4	17	148	104	+44	40
5	Florida Panthers	48	15	27	6	12	112	143	−31	36

Source: National Hockey League
y – Clinched division

Eastern Conference
Pos	Div	Team	GP	W	L	OTL	ROW	GF	GA	GD	Pts
1	AT	z – Pittsburgh Penguins	48	36	12	0	33	165	119	+46	72
2	NE	y – Montreal Canadiens	48	29	14	5	26	149	126	+23	63
3	SE	y – Washington Capitals	48	27	18	3	24	149	130	+19	57
4	NE	x – Boston Bruins	48	28	14	6	24	131	109	+22	62
5	NE	x – Toronto Maple Leafs	48	26	17	5	26	145	133	+12	57
6	AT	x – New York Rangers	48	26	18	4	22	130	112	+18	56
7	NE	x – Ottawa Senators	48	25	17	6	21	116	104	+12	56
8	AT	x – New York Islanders	48	24	17	7	20	139	139	0	55
9	SE	Winnipeg Jets	48	24	21	3	22	128	144	−16	51
10	AT	Philadelphia Flyers	48	23	22	3	22	133	141	−8	49
11	AT	New Jersey Devils	48	19	19	10	17	112	129	−17	48
12	NE	Buffalo Sabres	48	21	21	6	14	115	143	−28	48
13	SE	Carolina Hurricanes	48	19	25	4	18	128	160	−32	42
14	SE	Tampa Bay Lightning	48	18	26	4	17	148	150	−2	40
15	SE	Florida Panthers	48	15	27	6	12	112	171	−59	36

Source: National Hockey League
x – Clinched playoff spot; y – Clinched division; z – Clinched conference

== Schedule and results ==
2012–13 Game Log
January: 3–3–1 (Home: 2–1–0; Road: 1–2–1)

#	Jan	Visitor	Score	Home	OT/SO	Decision	Attendance	Record	Points
1	19	Ottawa	4–1	Winnipeg		Pavelec	15,004	0–1–0	0
2	21	Winnipeg	1–2	Boston	SO	Pavelec	17,565	0–1–1	1
3	22	Winnipeg	4–2	Washington		Pavelec	18,506	1–1–1	3
4	25	Pittsburgh	2–4	Winnipeg		Pavelec	15,004	2–1–1	5
5	27	NY Islanders	4–5	Winnipeg	OT	Montoya	15,004	3–1–1	7
6	29	Winnipeg	3–4	Montreal		Pavelec	21,273	3–2–1	7
7	31	Winnipeg	3–6	Florida		Pavelec	15,731	3–3–1	7

February: 7–6–0 (Home: 2–4–0; Road: 5–2–0)

#	Feb	Visitor	Score	Home	OT/SO	Decision	Attendance	Record	Points
8	1	Winnipeg	3–8	Tampa Bay		Pavelec	19,204	3–4–1	7
9	5	Florida	2–3	Winnipeg	OT	Pavelec	15,004	4–4–1	9
10	7	Toronto	3–2	Winnipeg		Pavelec	15,004	4–5–1	9
11	9	Winnipeg	1–0	Ottawa		Montoya	18,594	5–5–1	11
12	12	Philadelphia	3–2	Winnipeg		Pavelec	15,004	5–6–1	11
13	15	Pittsburgh	3–1	Winnipeg		Pavelec	15,004	5–7–1	11
14	17	Boston	3–2	Winnipeg		Pavelec	15,004	5–8–1	11
15	19	Winnipeg	2–1	Buffalo		Pavelec	19,070	6–8–1	13
16	21	Winnipeg	4–3	Carolina		Pavelec	18,282	7–8–1	15
17	23	Winnipeg	3–5	Philadelphia		Pavelec	19,933	7–9–1	15
18	24	Winnipeg	4–2	New Jersey		Pavelec	17,625	8–9–1	17
19	26	Winnipeg	4–3	NY Rangers		Pavelec	17,200	9–9–1	19
20	28	New Jersey	1–3	Winnipeg		Pavelec	15,004	10–9–1	21

March: 8–7–1 (Home: 4–4–0; Road: 4–3–1)

#	Mar	Visitor	Score	Home	OT/SO	Decision	Attendance	Record	Points
21	2	Washington	3–0	Winnipeg		Pavelec	15,004	10–10–1	21
22	5	Winnipeg	1–4	Florida		Pavelec	14,574	10–11–1	21
23	7	Winnipeg	2–1	Tampa Bay		Montoya	19,204	11–11–1	23
24	8	Winnipeg	3–2	Florida	OT	Pavelec	16,442	12–11–1	25
25	10	Winnipeg	2–3	New Jersey	SO	Pavelec	17,625	12–11–2	26
26	12	Toronto	2–5	Winnipeg		Pavelec	15,004	13–11–2	28
27	14	NY Rangers	1–3	Winnipeg		Pavelec	15,004	14–11–2	30
28	16	Winnipeg	5–4	Toronto	SO	Pavelec	19,401	15–11–2	32
29	17	Winnipeg	1–4	Ottawa		Pavelec	19,227	15–12–2	32
30	19	Boston	1–3	Winnipeg		Pavelec	15,004	16–12–2	34
31	21	Washington	4–0	Winnipeg		Pavelec	15,004	16–13–2	34
32	22	Washington	6–1	Winnipeg		Pavelec	15,004	16–14–2	34
33	24	Tampa Bay	2–3	Winnipeg		Pavelec	15,004	17–14–2	36
34	26	Winnipeg	4–1	Carolina		Pavelec	16,225	18–14–2	38
35	28	Winnipeg	0–4	Pittsburgh		Montoya	18,649	18–15–2	38
36	30	Carolina	3–1	Winnipeg		Pavelec	15,004	18–16–2	38

April: 6–5–1 (Home: 5–1–1; Road: 1–4–0)

#	Apr	Visitor	Score	Home	OT/SO	Decision	Attendance	Record	Points
37	1	Winnipeg	2–4	NY Rangers		Pavelec	17,200	18–17–2	38
38	2	Winnipeg	2–5	NY Islanders		Pavelec	11,819	18–18–2	38
39	4	Winnipeg	1–4	Montreal		Pavelec	21,273	18–19–2	38
40	6	Philadelphia	1–4	Winnipeg		Pavelec	15,004	19–19–2	40
41	9	Buffalo	1–4	Winnipeg		Pavelec	15,004	20–19–2	42
42	11	Florida	2–7	Winnipeg		Pavelec	15,004	21–19–2	44
43	16	Tampa Bay	3–4	Winnipeg	SO	Pavelec	15,004	22–19–2	46
44	18	Carolina	3–4	Winnipeg	OT	Pavelec	15,004	23–19–2	48
45	20	NY Islanders	5–4	Winnipeg	SO	Pavelec	15,004	23–19–3	49
46	22	Winnipeg	2–1	Buffalo		Pavelec	18,654	24–19–3	51
47	23	Winnipeg	3–5	Washington		Pavelec	18,506	24–20–3	51
48	25	Montreal	4–2	Winnipeg		Pavelec	15,004	24–21–3	51

Legend: = Win = Loss = OT/SO Loss

== Player statistics ==
Final stats

Skaters

Regular season
Player	GP	G	A	Pts	+/-	PIM
Andrew Ladd	48	18	28	46	10	22
Blake Wheeler	48	19	22	41	−3	28
Evander Kane	48	17	16	33	−3	80
Bryan Little	48	7	25	32	8	4
Dustin Byfuglien	43	8	20	28	−1	34
Nik Antropov	40	6	12	18	6	16
Grant Clitsome	44	4	12	16	10	18
Kyle Wellwood	39	6	9	15	0	2
Tobias Enstrom	22	4	11	15	−8	8
Olli Jokinen	45	7	7	14	−19	14
Zach Bogosian	33	5	9	14	−5	29
Ron Hainsey	47	0	13	13	−8	10
Alexander Burmistrov	44	4	6	10	0	14
Paul Postma	34	4	5	9	−5	6
Antti Miettinen	22	3	2	5	−3	2
James Wright	38	2	3	5	−5	31
Chris Thorburn	42	2	2	4	−5	70
Mark Stuart	42	2	2	4	5	53
Eric Tangradi^{†}	36	1	3	4	−4	22
Zach Redmond	8	1	3	4	0	12
Aaron Gagnon	10	3	0	3	2	2
Jim Slater	26	1	1	2	−3	19
Anthony Peluso	5	0	2	2	1	14
Alexei Ponikarovsky^{‡}	12	2	0	2	−2	6
Derek Meech	16	0	1	1	0	2
Mike Santorelli^{†}	10	0	1	1	−5	0
Patrice Cormier	10	0	0	0	−3	7
Mark Scheifele	4	0	0	0	0	0
Totals		126	215	341	−40	525

Goaltenders

Regular season
Player	GP	GS	TOI	W	L	OT	GA	GAA	SA	SV%	SO	G	A	PIM
Ondrej Pavelec	44	43	2552:43	21	20	3	119	2.80	1251	.905	0	0	0	2
Al Montoya	7	5	351:21	3	1	0	17	2.91	168	.899	1	0	0	0
Totals		48	2904:04	24	21	3	136	2.81	1419	.904	1	0	0	2

^{†}Denotes player spent time with another team before joining the Jets. Stats reflect time with the Jets only.
^{‡}Traded mid-season
Bold/italics denotes franchise record

== Transactions ==
Winnipeg has been involved in the following transactions during the 2012–13 season.

=== Trades ===
Date	Details
June 23, 2012	To Toronto Maple Leafs Conditional 7th-round pick in 2013 (Note: Condition not satisfied.)	To Winnipeg Jets Jonas Gustavsson (Note: Trade of negotiating rights to.)
February 13, 2013	To Pittsburgh Penguins 7th-round pick in 2013	To Winnipeg Jets Eric Tangradi
February 13, 2013	To New Jersey Devils Alexei Ponikarovsky	To Winnipeg Jets 7th-round pick in 2013; 4th-round pick in 2014
March 10, 2013	To Columbus Blue Jackets Spencer Machacek	To Winnipeg Jets Tomas Kubalik

=== Free agents signed ===
Player	Former team	Contract terms
Alexei Ponikarovsky	New Jersey Devils	1 year, $1.8 million
Olli Jokinen	Calgary Flames	2 years, $9 million
Al Montoya	New York Islanders	1 year, $601,000
Mark Dekanich	Columbus Blue Jackets	1 year, $600,000
Juho Olkinuora	University of Denver	2 years, $1.485 million entry-level contract

=== Free agents lost ===
Player	New team	Contract terms
Tanner Glass	Pittsburgh Penguins	2 years, $2.2 million
Jonas Gustavsson	Detroit Red Wings	2 years, $3 million
Chris Mason	Nashville Predators	1 year, $1.25 million
Tim Stapleton	Dinamo Minsk	undisclosed
Arturs Kulda	Sibir Novosibirsk	undisclosed
Mark Flood	Lokomotiv Yaroslavl	undisclosed
Brett Festerling	Nurnberg Ice Tigers	undisclosed
Eric Fehr	Washington Capitals	1 year, $600,000

=== Claimed via waivers ===
Player	Former team	Date claimed off waivers
Anthony Peluso	St. Louis Blues	January 16, 2013
James Wright	Florida Panthers	January 18, 2013
Mike Santorelli	Florida Panthers	April 3, 2013

=== Lost via waivers ===
Player	New team	Date claimed off waivers

=== Lost via retirement ===
Player

=== Player signings ===
Player	Date	Contract terms
Jim Slater	June 13, 2012	3 years, $4.8 million
Ondrej Pavelec	June 25, 2012	5 years, $19.5 million
Derek Meech	July 1, 2012	1 year, $700,000
Ben Maxwell	July 6, 2012	1 year, $650,000
Kyle Wellwood	July 13, 2012	1 year, $1.6 million
Paul Postma	July 13, 2012	1 year, $550,000
Maxime Macenauer	July 23, 2012	1 year, $525,000
Tobias Enstrom	July 27, 2012	5 years, $28.75 million contract extension
Spencer Machacek	September 11, 2012	1 year, $575,000
Evander Kane	September 15, 2012	6 years, $31.5 million
Jason Jaffray	January 16, 2013	1 year, $575,000
Arturs Kulda	March 18, 2013	1 year, $550,000
Jacob Trouba	April 2, 2013	3 years, $2.775 million entry-level contract
Adam Lowry	April 16, 2013	3 years, $2.485 million entry-level contract
Austen Brassard	June 1, 2013	3 years, $1.86 million entry-level contract

== Draft picks ==
Winnipeg's picks at the 2012 NHL entry draft in Pittsburgh, Pennsylvania.

Round	Overall	Player	Position	Nationality	College/Junior/Club team (League)
1	9	Jacob Trouba	D	United States	U.S. National Team Development Program (USHL)
2	39	Lukas Sutter	C	Canada	Saskatoon Blades (WHL)
3	70	Scott Kosmachuk	RW	Canada	Guelph Storm (OHL)
5	130	Connor Hellebuyck	G	United States	Odessa Jackalopes (NAHL)
6	160	Ryan Olsen	C	Canada	Saskatoon Blades (WHL)
7	190	Jamie Phillips	G	Canada	Toronto Jr. Canadiens (OJHL)

== See also ==
- 2012–13 NHL season
