= Brian Strait =

American ice hockey player (born 1988)

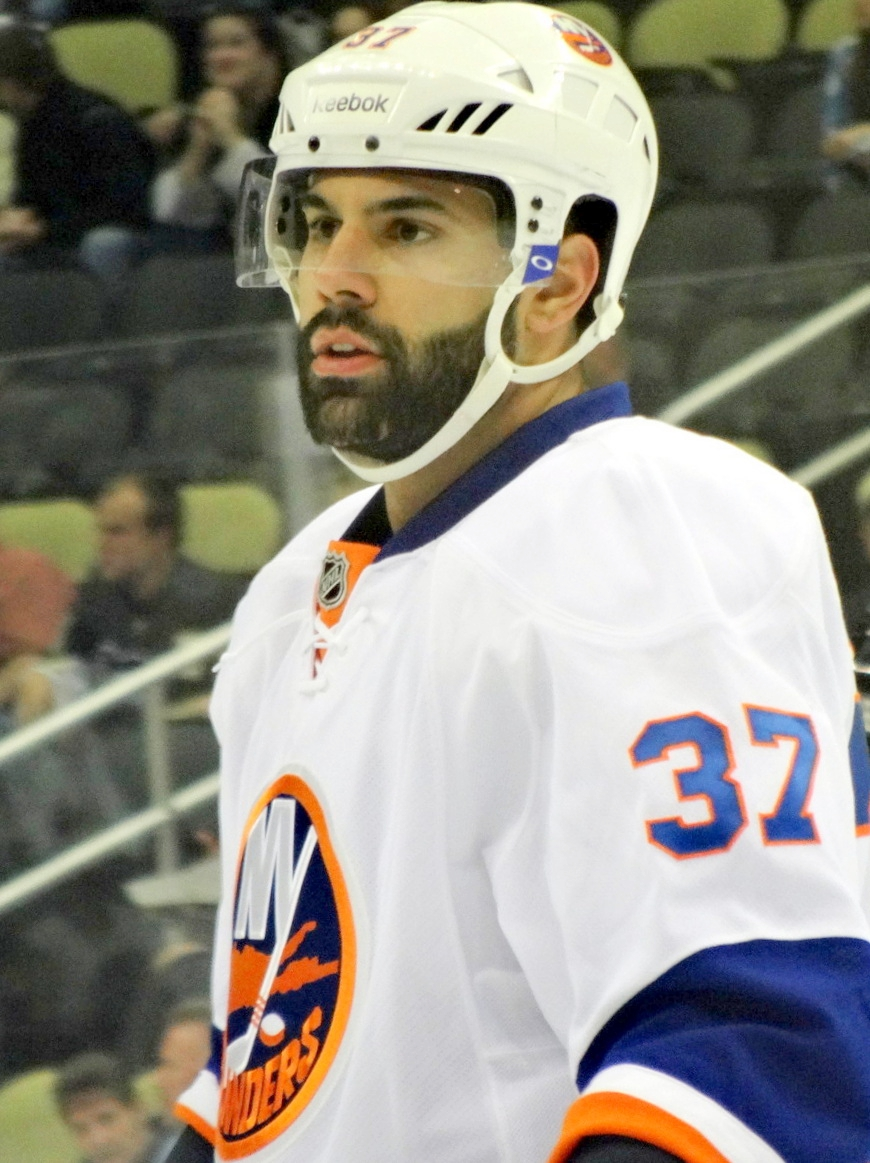
- Strait with the New York Islanders during the 2013 Stanley Cup playoffs
- Born: January 4, 1988 (age 38) Waltham, Massachusetts, U.S.
- Height: 6 ft 1 in (185 cm)
- Weight: 205 lb (93 kg; 14 st 9 lb)
- Position: Defense
- Shot: Left
- Played for: Pittsburgh Penguins; New York Islanders; Winnipeg Jets
- NHL draft: 65th overall, 2006; Pittsburgh Penguins
- Playing career: 2009–2019

Brian James Strait (born January 4, 1988) is an American former professional ice hockey defenseman who is an unrestricted free agent. He last played for the Binghamton Devils of the American Hockey League (AHL) while under contract to the New Jersey Devils of the National Hockey League (NHL). He has previously played with the Pittsburgh Penguins, New York Islanders and the Winnipeg Jets in the NHL.

== Playing career ==
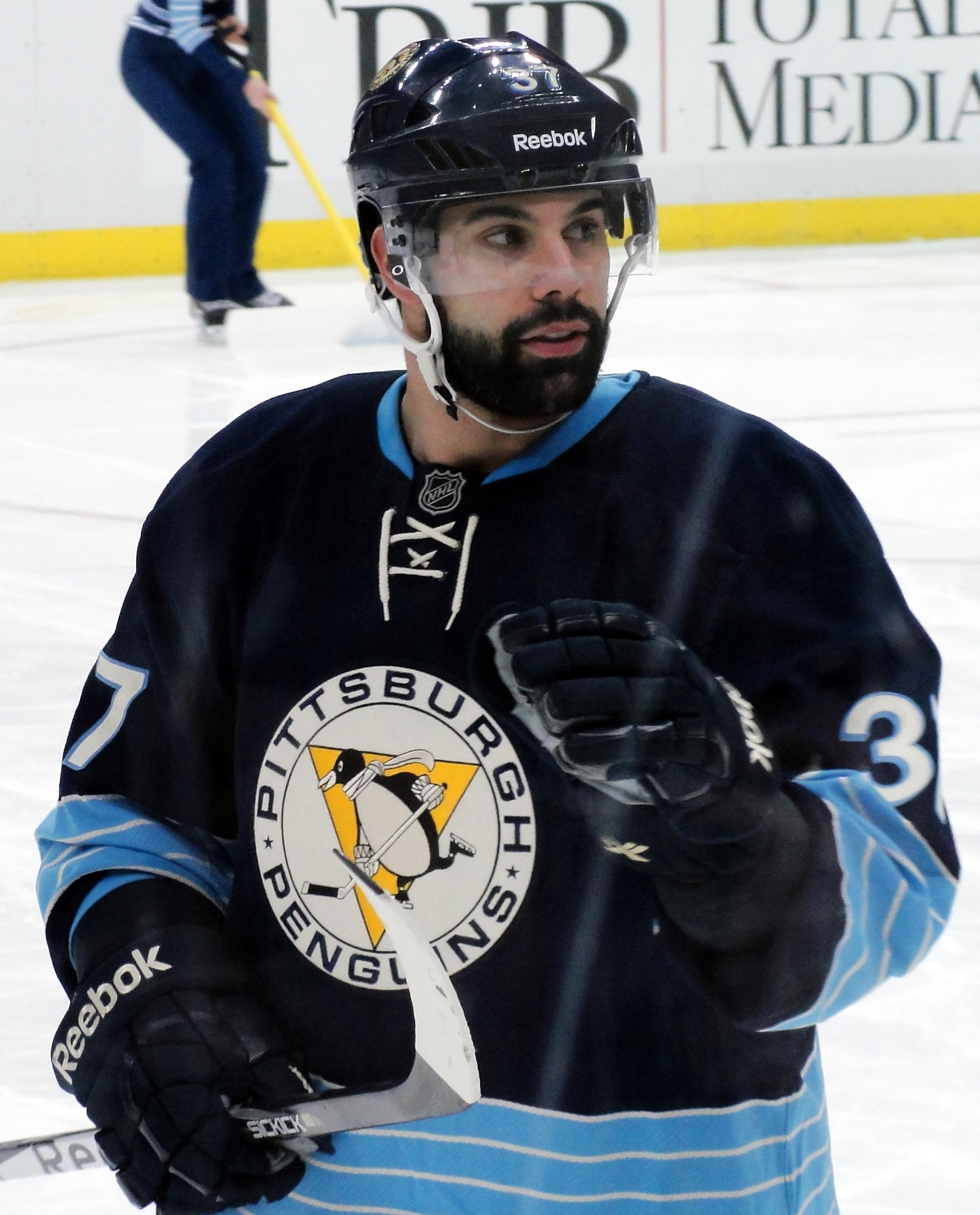
Strait with the Pittsburgh Penguins in 2012

=== Amateur ===
As a youth, Strait played in the 2002 Quebec International Pee-Wee Hockey Tournament with the Middlesex Islanders minor ice hockey team.

Strait played two seasons at the Northfield Mount Hermon School, recording 12 points during his freshman season, and 20 the next year. Beginning in 2004 he joined the U.S. National Development Team in the North American Hockey League. He was the captain of the gold-medal U.S. team at the 2006 IIHF World U18 Championships.

After graduating from Ann Arbor Pioneer High School in 2006, Strait attended Boston University, where he began playing for the Boston Terriers men's ice hockey team. In his freshman season, Strait was twice selected as Hockey East rookie of the week. He served as captain of the U.S. team at the 2008 World Junior Ice Hockey Championships, where the team finished fourth. That season he also was selected runner-up for the Hockey East Best Defensive Defenseman award. During his junior season at Boston, Strait served as an alternate captain. That season, the Terriers won the Beanpot, Hockey East and the NCAA Division I national championship.

=== Professional ===
After his junior season at Boston University, Strait signed a three-year entry-level contract with the Pittsburgh Penguins, who selected Strait in 2006. He began his professional career a few months later with the Penguins' American Hockey League affiliate, the Wilkes-Barre/Scranton Penguins.

Strait made his NHL debut with Pittsburgh on February 21, 2011, against the Washington Capitals. On the eve of the lockout shortened 2012–13 season, he was picked off of waivers from the Penguins by the New York Islanders January 18, 2013. After establishing his role within the Islanders defense after 6 games he signed a three-year one-way extension deal worth $775,000 per year on January 31, 2013. He scored his first NHL goal on December 20, 2013, against Henrik Lundqvist of the New York Rangers.

On July 1, 2016, Strait signed a one-year contract as a free agent with the Winnipeg Jets. Strait appeared in 5 games for 2 assists, over the course of the 2016–17 season, in his lone year with the Jets.

Having left the Jets at the conclusion of his contract, Strait returned to the Metropolitan division, in signing a one-year, two-way contract with the New Jersey Devils on July 1, 2017. In the 2017–18 season, he was reassigned to serve as an Alternate captain with the Devils AHL affiliate, the Binghamton Devils. Adding a veteran presence for the B-Devils inaugural campaign, Strait appeared in 61 games for 8 points. On May 8, 2018, Strait opted to forgo free agency agreeing to a two-year, two-way extension to remain with the New Jersey Devils.

== Career statistics ==
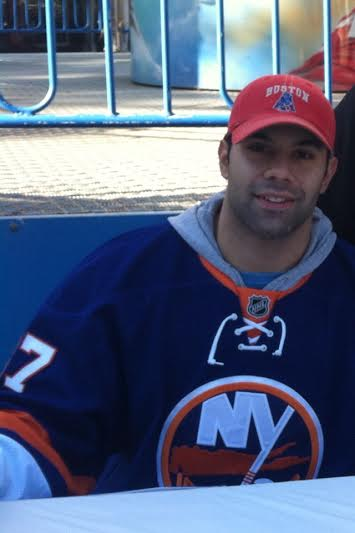
Strait with the New York Islanders in 2013

=== Regular Season and Playoffs ===
			Regular season					Playoffs
Season	Team	League	GP	G	A	Pts	PIM	GP	G	A	Pts	PIM
2002–03	Northfield Mount Hermon School	HS Prep	30	1	8	9		—	—	—	—	—
2003–04	Northfield Mount Hermon School	HS Prep	30	5	15	20		—	—	—	—	—
2004–05	US NTDP U17	USDP	18	1	5	6	8	—	—	—	—	—
2004–05	US NTDP U18	USDP	7	0	3	3	2	—	—	—	—	—
2004–05	US NTDP Juniors	NAHL	42	4	8	12	42	10	0	2	2	2
2005–06	US NTDP U18	USDP	40	2	7	9	31	—	—	—	—	—
2005–06	US NTDP U18	NAHL	15	0	5	5	41	—	—	—	—	—
2006–07	Boston University	HE	36	3	3	6	47	—	—	—	—	—
2007–08	Boston University	HE	37	0	10	10	20	—	—	—	—	—
2008–09	Boston University	HE	38	2	5	7	67	—	—	—	—	—
2009–10	Wilkes–Barre/Scranton Penguins	AHL	78	2	12	14	73	4	0	1	1	0
2010–11	Wilkes–Barre/Scranton Penguins	AHL	75	2	8	10	49	12	1	3	4	10
2010–11	Pittsburgh Penguins	NHL	3	0	0	0	0	—	—	—	—	—
2011–12	Wilkes–Barre/Scranton Penguins	AHL	41	4	12	16	26	2	0	1	1	0
2011–12	Pittsburgh Penguins	NHL	9	0	1	1	4	3	0	0	0	0
2012–13	Wilkes–Barre/Scranton Penguins	AHL	26	0	0	0	34	—	—	—	—	—
2012–13	New York Islanders	NHL	19	0	4	4	10	6	1	0	1	12
2013–14	New York Islanders	NHL	47	3	6	9	14	—	—	—	—	—
2014–15	New York Islanders	NHL	52	2	5	7	32	7	0	0	0	4
2015–16	New York Islanders	NHL	52	1	5	6	31	—	—	—	—	—
2016–17	Manitoba Moose	AHL	58	2	12	14	36	—	—	—	—	—
2016–17	Winnipeg Jets	NHL	5	0	2	2	0	—	—	—	—	—
2017–18	Binghamton Devils	AHL	61	3	5	8	52	—	—	—	—	—
2018–19	Binghamton Devils	AHL	10	0	0	0	8	—	—	—	—	—
AHL totals			349	13	49	62	278	18	1	5	6	10
NHL totals			187	6	23	29	91	16	1	0	1	16

Medal record

Representing United States

Ice hockey

IIHF U18 Championships
Gold medal – first place	2006 Ängelholm	

=== International ===
Year	Team	Event	Result	GP	G	A	Pts	PIM
2005	United States	U17	5th	5	0	0	0	2
2006	United States	WJC18	1st place, gold medalist(s)	6	0	0	0	4
2008	United States	WJC	4th	6	0	0	0	6
Junior totals				17	0	0	0	12
