= Joe Vitale (ice hockey) =

American ice hockey player

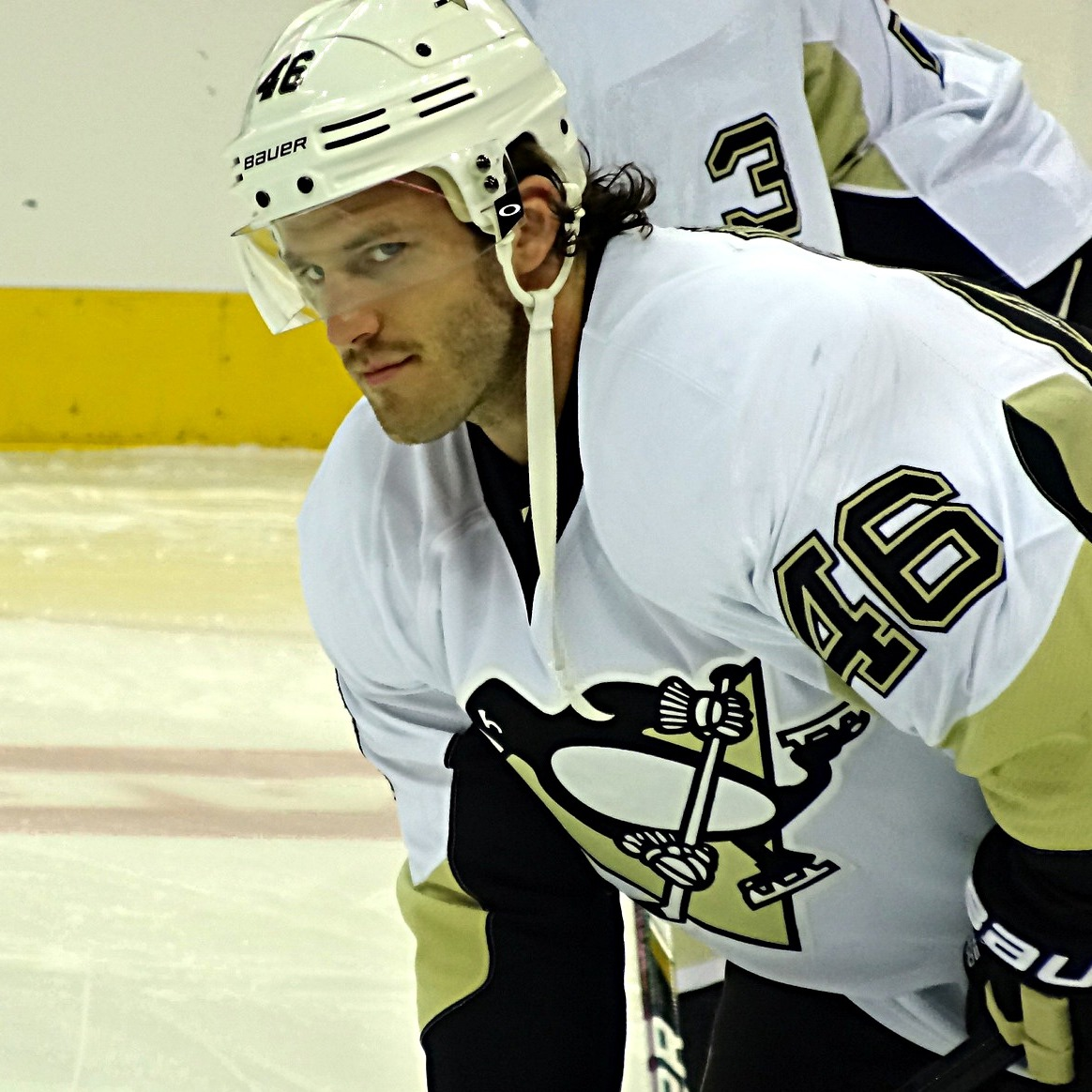
- Born: August 20, 1985 (age 41) St. Louis, Missouri, U.S.
- Height: 5 ft 11 in (180 cm)
- Weight: 207 lb (94 kg; 14 st 11 lb)
- Position: Center
- Shot: Right
- Played for: Pittsburgh Penguins; Arizona Coyotes
- NHL draft: 195th overall, 2005; Pittsburgh Penguins
- Playing career: 2009–2015

Joseph Dominic Vitale (born August 20, 1985) is an American former professional ice hockey player and the current radio and television color analyst for the St. Louis Blues. Vitale was drafted 195th overall in the 2005 NHL entry draft by the Pittsburgh Penguins, with whom he made his NHL debut. He also played with the Arizona Coyotes.

== Playing career ==
=== Amateur ===
As a youth, Vitale played in the 1999 Quebec International Pee-Wee Hockey Tournament with the St. Louis Blues minor ice hockey team.

Vitale graduated from Christian Brothers College High School in St. Louis, Missouri, where he was part of three state championships and two undefeated seasons. He also played for the St. Louis Jr. Blues of the Central States Hockey League for two seasons, including a national championship in 2003–04. In 2004–05, he played for the Sioux Falls Stampede of the United States Hockey League.

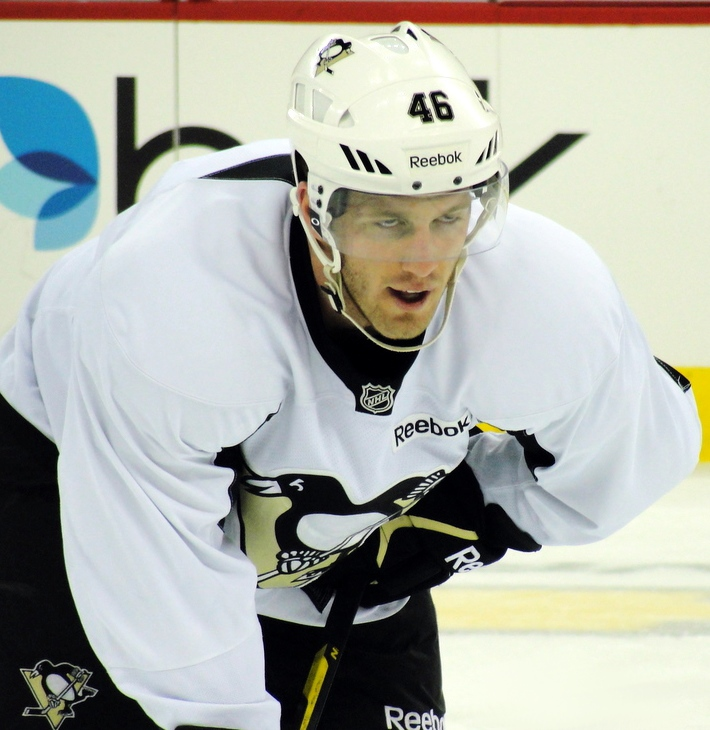
Joe Vitale, Pittsburgh Penguins

On July 30, 2005, Vitale was drafted by the Penguins with the 195th selection in the 2005 NHL entry draft. He enrolled in Northeastern University and began his college career as a freshman for the Huskies in 2005–06. He was named Hockey East Rookie of the Week in February and received Northeastern's Ed Arrington Memorial Rookie of the Year Award. In 2006–07, he was named alternate captain of the squad as a sophomore and was named to Hockey East's All-Academic Team. As a junior in 2007–08, he was named All-New England and New England's Most Improved Player, was named to the All-Hockey East Second Team, and was Northeastern's Most Valuable Player. Vitale's college career concluded when Northeastern lost to Cornell in the first round of the NCAA tournament, Northeastern's first trip to the NCAA tournament in 15 years. He finished his career at Northeastern with 34 goals and 60 assists for 94 points and 268 penalty minutes in 143 games.

=== Professional ===
==== Pittsburgh Penguins ====
On April 3, 2009, Vitale signed a one-year, entry level NHL contract with the Pittsburgh Penguins for the 2009–10 season. He also signed an Amateur Try-Out contract with the Wilkes-Barre/Scranton Penguins for the remainder of the 2008–09 season. He recorded his first professional goal and assist on April 4, 2009 against the Albany River Rats. He finished the season with 4 points in 5 regular season games. Vitale also played in all 12 of the Penguins playoff games. During the 2009–10 season, Vitale played in 74 games in the AHL, scoring six goals and recording 26 assists for a total of 32 points. In January 2010, the Penguins and Vitale agreed to a two-year contract extension through the 2011–12 season.

Vitale made his NHL debut with the Pittsburgh Penguins on February 10, 2011 against the Los Angeles Kings. On February 16, 2011, Vitale scored his first NHL goal against Peter Budaj of the Colorado Avalanche.

On February 3, 2012, Vitale was re-signed by the Pittsburgh Penguins to a two-year contract extension worth $1.1 million.

==== Arizona Coyotes ====
As a free agent, Vitale joined his second NHL team, signing a three-year contract with the Arizona Coyotes on July 1, 2014. In his second year with the Coyotes, Vitale began the 2015–16 NHL season. On October 17, 2015, Vitale was injured in his first game of the year against the Boston Bruins. In a fight against Kevan Miller, Vitale suffered a fractured orbital bone and was expected to miss 4–6 weeks. Suffering lingering concussion issues as a result of the fight, Vitale was unable to make progress and on February 11, 2016, he was ruled out for the remainder of the 2015–16 season.

==== Detroit Red Wings ====
On June 24, 2016, the Coyotes traded Vitale, the 20th overall pick, and the 53rd overall pick in the 2016 NHL entry draft, to the Detroit Red Wings in exchange for Pavel Datsyuk's $7.5 million cap hit and the 16th overall pick. Due to a concussion that sidelined Vitale for all but one game of the previous season, he sat out the entirety of the 2016–17 season and, with his contract expiring that year, he never played a game for the Red Wings. Vitale retired in July 2017 due to his career-ending concussion.

== Post-playing career ==
On August 15, 2018, St. Louis native Vitale was named as the new radio color analyst of the St. Louis Blues on KMOX, the team's flagship station; the broadcasts moved to WXOS in 2019-20. As of 2025-26, Vitale is also the color analyst on FanDuel Sports Network Midwest's televised Blues coverage.

== Career statistics ==
			Regular season					Playoffs
Season	Team	League	GP	G	A	Pts	PIM	GP	G	A	Pts	PIM
2000–01	Christian Brothers College High School	HS-MO		8	24	32		—	—	—	—	—
2001–02	Christian Brothers College High School	HS-MO		6	13	19		—	—	—	—	—
2002–03	Christian Brothers College High School	HS-MO		6	3	9		—	—	—	—	—
2002–03	St. Louis Jr. Blues	CSHL	44	19	30	49	44	—	—	—	—	—
2003–04	Christian Brothers College High School	HS-MO		25	30	55		—	—	—	—	—
2003–04	St. Louis Jr. Blues	CSHL	43	21	29	50	42	—	—	—	—	—
2004–05	Sioux Falls Stampede	USHL	53	11	20	31	62	—	—	—	—	—
2005–06	Northeastern University	HE	31	8	8	16	71	—	—	—	—	—
2006–07	Northeastern University	HE	35	7	9	16	54	—	—	—	—	—
2007–08	Northeastern University	HE	37	12	23	35	75	—	—	—	—	—
2008–09	Northeastern University	HE	40	7	20	27	68	—	—	—	—	—
2008–09	Wilkes-Barre/Scranton Penguins	AHL	5	2	2	4	2	12	0	0	0	12
2009–10	Wilkes-Barre/Scranton Penguins	AHL	74	6	26	32	70	4	0	2	2	0
2010–11	Wilkes-Barre/Scranton Penguins	AHL	60	9	21	30	64	11	3	3	6	18
2010–11	Pittsburgh Penguins	NHL	9	1	1	2	13	—	—	—	—	—
2011–12	Pittsburgh Penguins	NHL	68	4	10	14	56	4	0	0	0	12
2012–13	Pittsburgh Penguins	NHL	33	2	3	5	17	6	0	1	1	6
2013–14	Pittsburgh Penguins	NHL	53	1	13	14	29	13	0	0	0	4
2014–15	Arizona Coyotes	NHL	70	3	6	9	36	—	—	—	—	—
2015–16	Arizona Coyotes	NHL	1	0	0	0	5	—	—	—	—	—
AHL totals			139	17	49	66	132	27	3	5	8	30
NHL totals			234	11	33	44	156	23	0	1	1	22

== Awards and honors ==
Award	Year
College
All-Hockey East Second Team	2007–08

Awards and achievements
Preceded by Matt Greene	Hockey East Best Defensive Forward; 2008–09	Succeeded by Ben Holmstrom
