= Tanner Glass =

Canadian ice hockey player (born 1983)

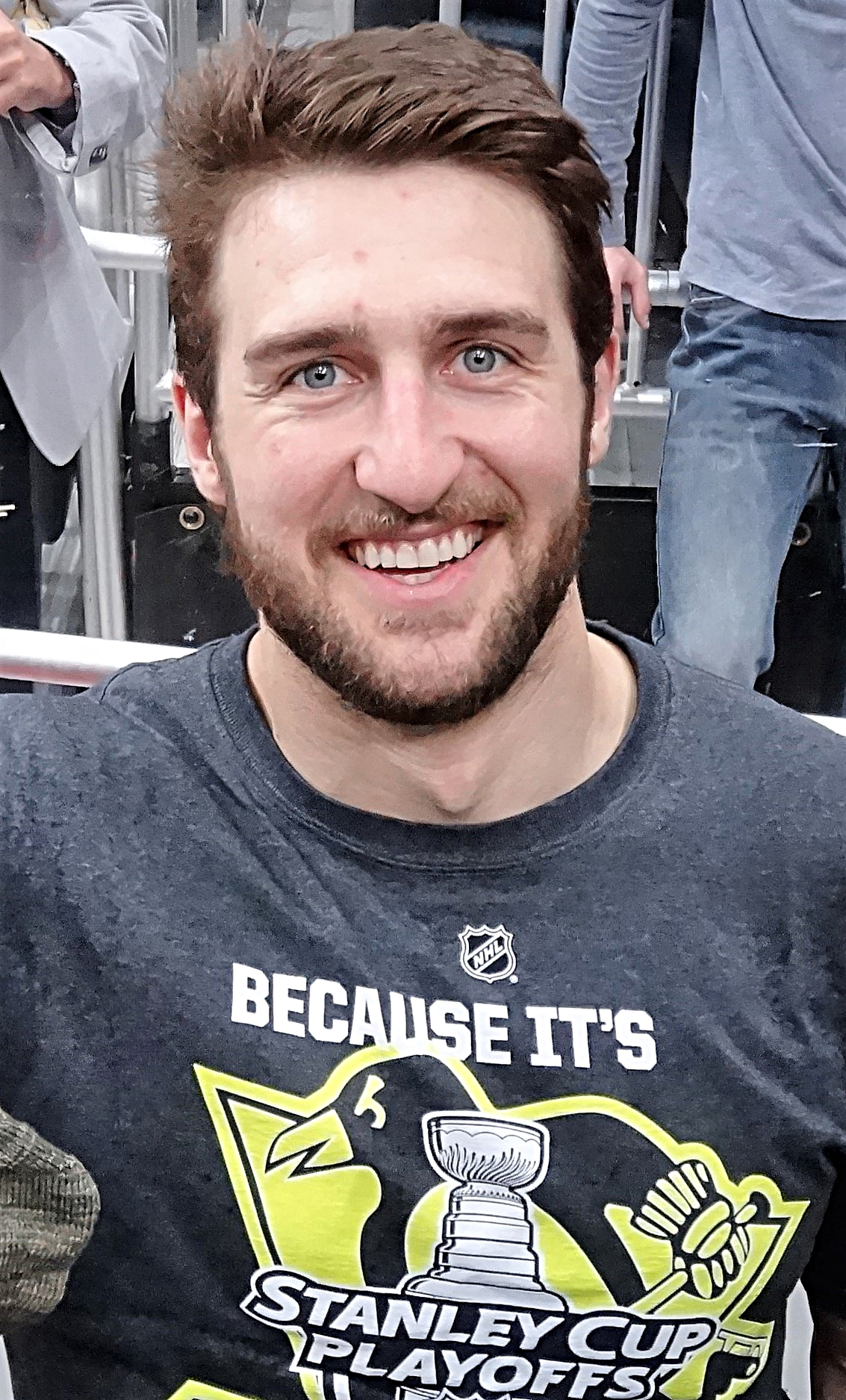
- Glass with the Pittsburgh Penguins in April 2013
- Born: November 29, 1983 (age 42) Regina, Saskatchewan, Canada
- Position: Left wing
- Shot: Left
- Played for: Florida Panthers; Vancouver Canucks; Winnipeg Jets; Pittsburgh Penguins; New York Rangers; Calgary Flames
- NHL draft: 265th overall, 2003; Florida Panthers
- Playing career: 2007–2018

Tanner Glass (born November 29, 1983) is a Canadian former professional ice hockey player. Known as a physical player, he was a winger in the National Hockey League (NHL) for the Florida Panthers, Vancouver Canucks, Winnipeg Jets, Pittsburgh Penguins, New York Rangers and Calgary Flames. During the 2012 NHL Lockout, he played for HC '05 Banská Bystrica in the Slovak Extraliga and he also had a spell with Boxers de Bordeaux of the French Ligue Magnus.

Glass played junior hockey in the British Columbia Hockey League (BCHL) for two seasons with the Penticton Panthers and Nanaimo Clippers, earning All-Star Team honours in 2003. Going on to the college ranks with the Dartmouth Big Green for four seasons, he helped his club to two third-place finishes in the ECAC Hockey Conference and served as team captain in his senior year. Selected 265th overall by the Florida Panthers in the 2003 NHL entry draft, he turned professional in 2007 with the team's American Hockey League (AHL) affiliate, the Rochester Americans. For the next two seasons, he split time between the NHL and AHL before signing with the Canucks in July 2009 as an unrestricted free agent. He solidified his role as a fourth-line forward on the team and helped them to the 2011 Stanley Cup Finals, where they lost to the Boston Bruins. In July 2011, he left the Canucks for the Jets via free agency. The following year, he signed with the Penguins as a free agent, and subsequently played with the Rangers after his contract with the Penguins expired.

Glass has been the Rangers' Assistant Director of Player Development since he officially announced his retirement as an active player in June 2019.

== Playing career ==
=== Amateur ===
Born in Regina, Saskatchewan, Glass played midget with the Yorkton Mallers of the Saskatchewan Midget Hockey League (SMHL). In 2001–02, he began a two-year career of Junior A in the British Columbia Hockey League (BCHL). Playing his rookie season with the Penticton Panthers, he recorded 11 goals and 39 points over 57 games. The following season, he was traded to the Nanaimo Clippers after 32 games with Penticton. He finished his second junior season with 23 goals and 62 points over 50 games, split between Penticton and Nanaimo. In addition to appearing in the 2003 BCHL All-Star Game, Glass received end-of-season BCHL All-Star Team honours. In the off-season, he was selected 265th overall in the 2003 NHL entry draft by the Florida Panthers.

Following his draft, he joined the college hockey ranks with the Dartmouth Big Green of the ECAC Hockey Conference. He missed 8 games in his freshman year due to mononucleosis, finishing with 11 points over 26 games. He helped the Big Green to the third-place game of the ECAC playoffs, where they lost to the Colgate Raiders. The following season, he improved to 15 points in 33 games. Prior to his junior year, he was named an alternate captain for the Big Green, going on to score a college career-high 12 goals and 28 points over 33 games. Glass made his second appearance in the ECAC's third-place game, winning 3–2 against Colgate. Captaining the team as a senior in 2006–07, Glass matched his career-high 28 points and helped Dartmouth to the third-place game once more. He finished his college career losing to the St. Lawrence Saints.

=== Florida Panthers ===
Still unsigned by the Panthers at the end of his college career, Glass received an amateur tryout contract from Florida's American Hockey League (AHL) affiliate, the Rochester Americans, on March 21, 2007. He notched his first professional point, an assist, against the Syracuse Crunch four days later. Playing the final four games of the 2006–07 AHL season, he finished with one assist in his initial stint with the Americans. After signing his first NHL contract with the Panthers in August 2007, Glass split the 2007–08 season between Rochester and Florida. He began the campaign in the AHL, scoring his first professional goal against goaltender Jaroslav Halak in a game against the Hamilton Bulldogs on October 12, 2007. The following month, he received his first NHL call-up and earned just over a minute of ice time in his NHL debut against the Carolina Hurricanes, a 4–3 loss on November 12, 2007. After being sent back down within eight days, Glass earned two more call-ups over the course of the season. On January 22, 2008, he scored his first NHL goal against Ray Emery in a 5–3 win against the Ottawa Senators. Playing 41 games in his rookie NHL season, he notched a goal and an assist, while also recording 11 points in 43 AHL games. Beginning the 2008–09 season in the AHL for the second consecutive year, Glass was appointed as an alternate captain for the Americans. After appearing in 44 AHL games (4 goals and 13 points) and 3 NHL games (no points), he sustained a season-ending injury on February 7, 2009. Glass did not receive a qualifying offer from the Panthers for the following season.

=== Vancouver Canucks ===
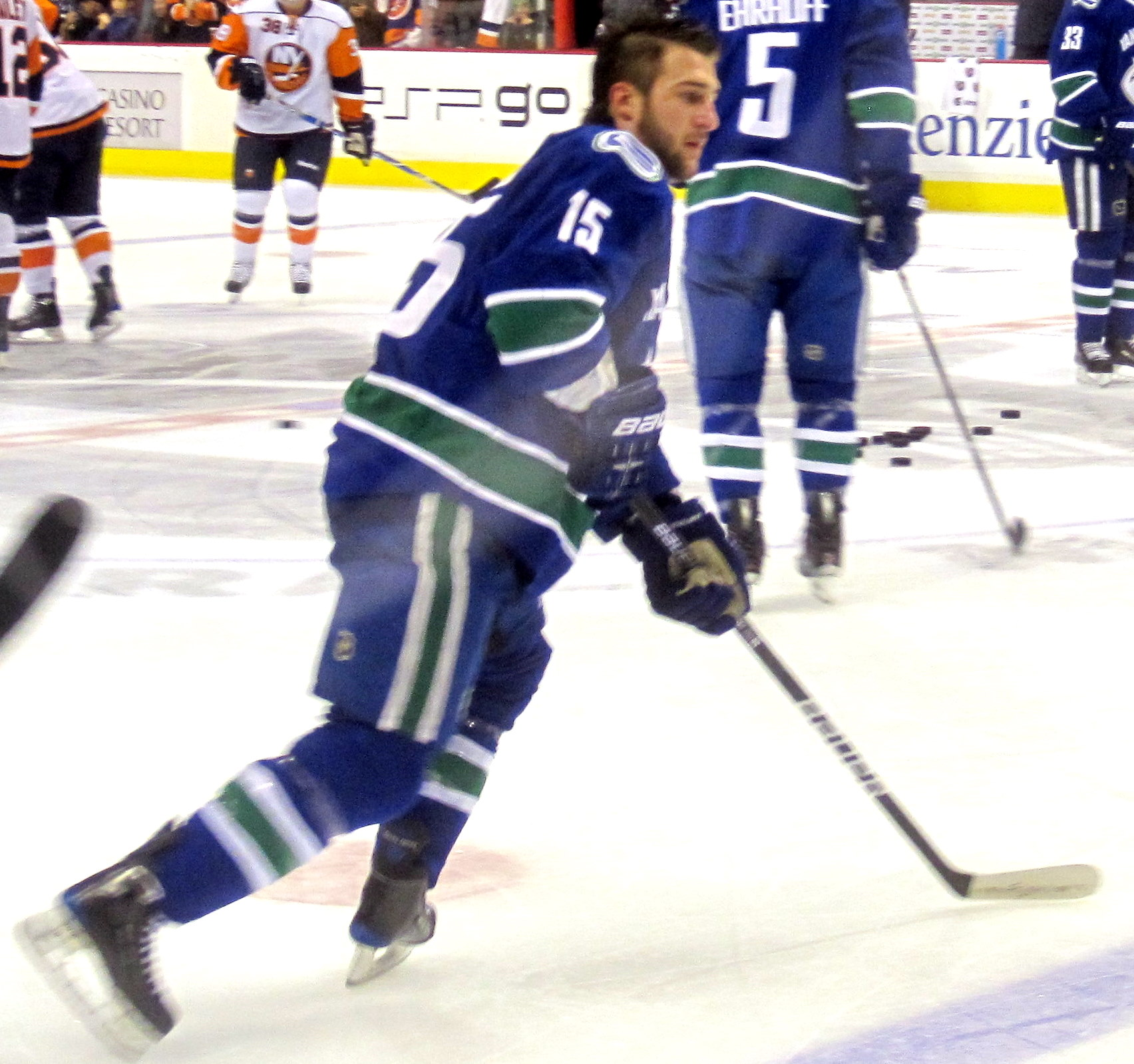
Glass with the Vancouver Canucks in March 2010

Glass became an unrestricted free agent in the off-season. On the first day of free agency, he was signed by the Vancouver Canucks to a one-year, two-way deal worth the league-minimum $500,000 at the NHL level.

With early injuries to Canucks forwards during training camp, Glass made the line-up for the start of the season as the thirteenth forward. He scored his first goal with the Canucks on November 1, 2009, in a 3–0 win against the Colorado Avalanche. He recorded 11 points (four goals and seven assists) over 67 games in 2009–10.

In the off-season, Glass filed for arbitration, looking for a one-way contract to ensure an NHL salary. He was re-signed on July 12, 2010, to a one-year contract worth $625,000. Until suffering an upper-body injury during practice in early March 2011, Glass was the lone staple on the Canucks' fourth line, playing with a rotation of wingers and centres. Glass missed nine games with the injury, returning in early April. He finished the regular season with three goals and seven assists for 10 points over 73 games, helping the Canucks win the Presidents' Trophy as the team with the league's best record for the first time in franchise history. With the top seed in the Western Conference, the Canucks eliminated the Chicago Blackhawks, Nashville Predators and San Jose Sharks in the first three rounds of the 2011 playoffs en route to the 2011 Stanley Cup Finals, where they lost in seven games to the Boston Bruins, despite initially holding a 3–2 series lead. Over 20 post-season games, Glass recorded no points and 18 penalty minutes.

=== Winnipeg Jets ===
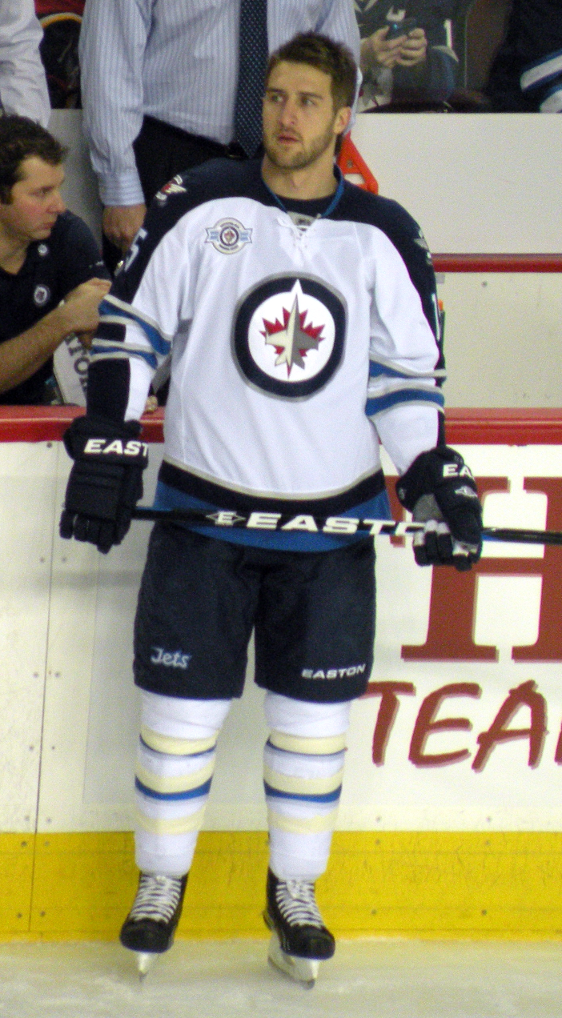
Glass during his tenure with the Jets in March 2012

Set to become an unrestricted free agent in the off-season, Glass expressed a desire to return to the Canucks, but he was not re-signed. On July 1, 2011, he agreed to a one-year contract worth $750,000 with the Winnipeg Jets. Playing on the Jets' third line with Jim Slater and Chris Thorburn, Glass set career highs in goals, assists and points in his first and only season with Winnipeg, earning a total of 16 points.

=== Pittsburgh Penguins ===
The Jets did not re-sign Glass, and on July 1, 2012, he signed a two-year contract with the Pittsburgh Penguins, worth $1.1 million per year. During the 2012–13 NHL lockout, Glass played in the Slovak Extraliga for Banská Bystrica. In six games for the Slovak club, he tallied one assist. Once the NHL season finally began, he played in 48 games, scoring two points.

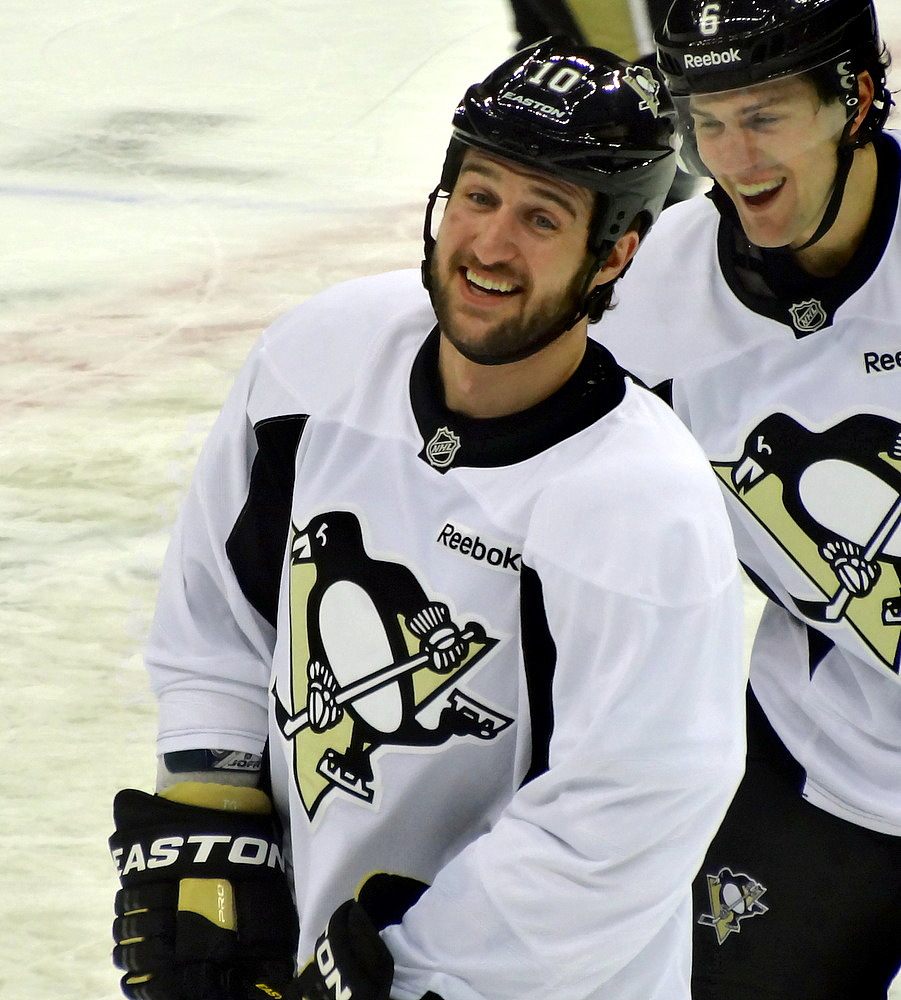
Glass during his time with the Penguins in January 2013.

On November 23, 2013, in a match against the Montreal Canadiens, Glass broke his hand blocking a shot from P.K. Subban. He was placed on the injured reserve for 33 days before returning to the ice on December 27 against the Carolina Hurricanes. On January 26, 2014, Glass registered 13 of the Penguins' 36 total hits in a loss to the Dallas Stars.

=== New York Rangers ===
On July 1, 2014, Glass signed as a free agent with the New York Rangers on a three-year contract worth $1.45 million per year.

Glass underwhelmed in 2014-15, with 6 points in 66 games, and after a poor start to the 2015-16 season, Glass was put on waivers and assigned to the Hartford Wolf Pack. Glass was then recalled by the Rangers on December 14 after Jarret Stoll was waived.

=== Calgary Flames ===
On August 29, 2017, Glass signed a professional tryout agreement with the Calgary Flames. On October 3, the Flames signed Glass to a one-year, $650,000 contract.

=== Europe ===
Following the completion of the 2017–18 season with the Flames, his 11th in the NHL, Glass opted to sign abroad, agreeing to a one-year contract with French club Boxers de Bordeaux of the Ligue Magnus on August 31, 2018. On June 13, 2019, the club announced his retirement from playing professional hockey.

== Playing style ==
Glass has established himself as primarily a fourth-line forward in the NHL. His work ethic makes him effective at blocking shots. A physical and aggressive player, he is also known to be a capable fighter. He has also been recognized as a leader on his teams, serving as an alternate captain with Rochester in the AHL, as well as a captain with Dartmouth during his college career.

== Personal life ==
Glass was born in Regina, Saskatchewan, to Fred and Cathy Glass. He has a brother, Darnell, and a sister, Shayna. Growing up in nearby Craven, Saskatchewan, he graduated from Lumsden High School. An honour roll student, Glass also played on several athletic high school teams. He won provincial championships in baseball and hockey, as well bronze medals in the 200 metre and 4x100 metre relay track events. On July 23, 2011, Glass married Emily Tracy in Seattle, Washington; the couple have two sons together.

== Career statistics ==
			Regular season					Playoffs
Season	Team	League	GP	G	A	Pts	PIM	GP	G	A	Pts	PIM
1999–2000	Yorkton Mallers AAA	SMHL	41	11	18	29	194	—	—	—	—	—
1999–2000	Yorkton Terriers	SJHL	6	1	0	1	4	2	0	0	0	0
2000–01	Yorkton Mallers AAA	SMHL	39	31	29	60	120	4	3	1	4	10
2000–01	Weyburn Red Wings	SJHL	2	0	1	1	2	—	—	—	—	—
2001–02	Penticton Panthers	BCHL	57	11	28	39	171	—	—	—	—	—
2002–03	Penticton Panthers	BCHL	32	15	25	40	108	—	—	—	—	—
2002–03	Nanaimo Clippers	BCHL	18	8	14	22	46	—	—	—	—	—
2003–04	Dartmouth College	ECAC	26	4	7	11	18	—	—	—	—	—
2004–05	Dartmouth College	ECAC	33	7	8	15	32	—	—	—	—	—
2005–06	Dartmouth College	ECAC	33	12	16	28	56	—	—	—	—	—
2006–07	Dartmouth College	ECAC	32	8	20	28	92	—	—	—	—	—
2006–07	Rochester Americans	AHL	4	0	1	1	5	—	—	—	—	—
2007–08	Rochester Americans	AHL	43	6	5	11	84	—	—	—	—	—
2007–08	Florida Panthers	NHL	41	1	1	2	39	—	—	—	—	—
2008–09	Rochester Americans	AHL	44	4	9	13	100	—	—	—	—	—
2008–09	Florida Panthers	NHL	3	0	0	0	7	—	—	—	—	—
2009–10	Vancouver Canucks	NHL	67	4	7	11	115	4	0	0	0	0
2010–11	Vancouver Canucks	NHL	73	3	7	10	72	20	0	0	0	18
2011–12	Winnipeg Jets	NHL	78	5	11	16	73	—	—	—	—	—
2012–13	HC ’05 Banská Bystrica	Slovak	6	0	1	1	75	—	—	—	—	—
2012–13	Pittsburgh Penguins	NHL	48	1	1	2	62	5	1	0	1	4
2013–14	Pittsburgh Penguins	NHL	67	4	9	13	90	8	0	0	0	4
2014–15	New York Rangers	NHL	66	1	5	6	98	19	0	1	1	31
2015–16	New York Rangers	NHL	57	4	3	7	66	4	0	0	0	4
2015–16	Hartford Wolf Pack	AHL	17	2	3	5	23	—	—	—	—	—
2016–17	Hartford Wolf Pack	AHL	57	6	9	15	86	—	—	—	—	—
2016–17	New York Rangers	NHL	11	1	1	2	17	7	1	3	4	7
2017–18	Calgary Flames	NHL	16	0	0	0	19	—	—	—	—	—
2017–18	Stockton Heat	AHL	21	2	3	5	45	—	—	—	—	—
2018–19	Boxers de Bordeaux	FRA	43	6	11	17	101	7	0	0	0	16
NHL totals			527	24	45	69	658	67	2	4	6	68

== Awards and honours ==
Award	Year
BCHL
All-Star Game	2003
All-Star Team	2003
