= 2012–13 Montreal Canadiens season =

NHL hockey team season

2012–13 Montreal Canadiens
- Northeast Division champions
- Division: 1st Northeast
- Conference: 2nd Eastern
- 2012–13 record: 29–14–5
- Home record: 14–7–3
- Road record: 15–7–2
- Goals for: 149
- Goals against: 126

Team information
- General manager: Marc Bergevin
- Coach: Michel Therrien
- Captain: Brian Gionta
- Alternate captains: Josh Gorges; Andrei Markov
- Arena: Bell Centre
- Average attendance: 21,273 (100.0%)

Team leaders
- Goals: Michael Ryder (16)
- Assists: P. K. Subban (27)
- Points: Max Pacioretty (39)
- Penalty minutes: Brandon Prust (110)
- Plus/minus: Alex Galchenyuk (+14)
- Wins: Carey Price (21)
- Goals against average: Peter Budaj (2.29)

The 2012–13 Montreal Canadiens season was the 104th season of play for the franchise that was founded on December 4, 1909, and its 96th season in the National Hockey League (NHL). The regular season was reduced from its usual 82 games to 48 due to a lockout.

== Off-season ==
After a disappointing 2011–12 season, the Canadiens started over in the front office. Marc Bergevin was named the new general manager on May 2, 2012. Rick Dudley was then named as the assistant general manager. The search then began for a new head coach and on June 5, Michel Therrien was named the new head coach. This would be Therrien's second stint as the Canadiens head coach (previously coached team from 2000 to 2003) Scott Mellanby was hired as the director of player personnel and Randy Cunneyworth and Randy Ladouceur were relieved of their assistant coaching duties. Some other hockey operations changes included the hiring of Martin Lapointe as director of player development, Patrice Brisebois was hired as a player development coach and on June 15, Gerard Gallant, J. J. Daigneault and Clement Jodoin were added to Montreal's coaching staff as assistant coaches.

Montreal held the third overall pick in the 2012 NHL entry draft and selected Alex Galchenyuk from the Sarnia Sting.

2012–13 Cancelled Games (For reference only)
Preseason

#	Date	Visitor	Home
1	September 23	Ottawa	Montreal
2	September 24	Buffalo	Montreal
3	September 27	Montreal	Ottawa
4	October 2	Montreal	Carolina
5	October 3	Carolina	Montreal
6	October 6	Boston	Montreal
7	October 7	New Jersey	Montreal

October

#	Date	Visitor	Home
1	October 11	Ottawa	Montreal
2	October 13	Montreal	Toronto
3	October 16	Boston	Montreal
4	October 18	Montreal	Boston
5	October 20	Washington	Montreal
6	October 23	Montreal	Minnesota
7	October 25	Philadelphia	Montreal
8	October 27	Anaheim	Montreal
9	October 30	Montreal	Calgary

November

#	Date	Visitor	Home
10	November 1	Montreal	Edmonton
11	November 3	Montreal	Vancouver
12	November 6	Phoenix	Montreal
13	November 8	Winnipeg	Montreal
14	November 10	NY Rangers	Montreal
15	November 13	Calgary	Montreal
16	November 15	Montreal	Winnipeg
17	November 17	Montreal	Colorado
18	November 19	Nashville	Montreal
19	November 20	Montreal	New Jersey
20	November 24	Vancouver	Montreal
21	November 27	Tampa Bay	Montreal

December

#	Date	Visitor	Home
22	December 1	Toronto	Montreal
23	December 2	Montreal	Columbus
24	December 4	Chicago	Montreal
25	December 6	Montreal	Buffalo
26	December 8	Buffalo	Montreal
27	December 10	Carolina	Montreal
28	December 12	Montreal	NY Rangers
29	December 13	Los Angeles	Montreal
30	December 15	Montreal	Buffalo
31	December 17	Buffalo	Montreal
32	December 19	Montreal	Ottawa
33	December 20	Montreal	Washington
34	December 22	Montreal	Toronto
35	December 27	Montreal	Tampa Bay
36	December 28	Montreal	Florida
37	December 31	Montreal	Carolina

January

#	Date	Visitor	Home
38	January 3	New Jersey	Montreal
39	January 5	Toronto	Montreal
40	January 8	Florida	Montreal
41	January 10	Montreal	Philadelphia
42	January 12	Montreal	Dallas
43	January 13	Montreal	St. Louis
44	January 16	Pittsburgh	Montreal
45	January 18	Montreal	Pittsburgh
46	January 19	Boston	Montreal
47	January 22	Tampa Bay	Montreal
48	January 29	Edmonton	Montreal
49	January 30	Montreal	Detroit

February

#	Date	Visitor	Home
50	February 2	NY Islanders	Montreal
51	February 3	Ottawa	Montreal
52	February 6	Carolina	Montreal
53	February 8	Montreal	Pittsburgh
54	February 9	Toronto	Montreal
55	February 12	Montreal	NY Islanders
56	February 15	Montreal	Buffalo
57	February 17	Montreal	Winnipeg
58	February 19	San Jose	Montreal
59	February 20	Montreal	NY Rangers
60	February 23	Pittsburgh	Montreal
61	February 25	Montreal	Ottawa
62	February 28	Boston	Montreal

March

#	Date	Visitor	Home
63	March 2	NY Islanders	Montreal
64	March 4	Montreal	Boston
65	March 7	Montreal	Washington
66	March 9	Montreal	Tampa Bay
67	March 10	Montreal	Florida
68	March 13	Ottawa	Montreal
69	March 15	Montreal	Philadelphia
70	March 16	Montreal	New Jersey
71	March 19	Montreal	Ottawa
72	March 21	New Jersey	Montreal
73	March 23	Montreal	NY Islanders
74	March 26	Winnipeg	Montreal
75	March 27	Montreal	Winnipeg
76	March 30	NY Rangers	Montreal

April

#	Date	Visitor	Home
77	April 2	Philadelphia	Montreal
78	April 4	Washington	Montreal
79	April 6	Buffalo	Montreal
80	April 9	Florida	Montreal
81	April 12	Montreal	Carolina
82	April 13	Montreal	Toronto

== Regular season ==
The Canadiens had the most power-play opportunities during the regular season, with 207. They also tied the Tampa Bay Lightning for the fewest shorthanded goals scored, with zero.

== Standings ==
Northeast Division
Pos	Team	GP	W	L	OTL	ROW	GF	GA	GD	Pts
1	y – Montreal Canadiens	48	29	14	5	26	149	126	+23	63
2	x – Boston Bruins	48	28	14	6	24	131	109	+22	62
3	x – Toronto Maple Leafs	48	26	17	5	26	145	133	+12	57
4	x – Ottawa Senators	48	25	17	6	21	116	104	+12	56
5	Buffalo Sabres	48	21	21	6	14	125	143	−18	48

Source: National Hockey League
x – Clinched playoff spot; y – Clinched division

Eastern Conference
Pos	Div	Team	GP	W	L	OTL	ROW	GF	GA	GD	Pts
1	AT	z – Pittsburgh Penguins	48	36	12	0	33	165	119	+46	72
2	NE	y – Montreal Canadiens	48	29	14	5	26	149	126	+23	63
3	SE	y – Washington Capitals	48	27	18	3	24	149	130	+19	57
4	NE	x – Boston Bruins	48	28	14	6	24	131	109	+22	62
5	NE	x – Toronto Maple Leafs	48	26	17	5	26	145	133	+12	57
6	AT	x – New York Rangers	48	26	18	4	22	130	112	+18	56
7	NE	x – Ottawa Senators	48	25	17	6	21	116	104	+12	56
8	AT	x – New York Islanders	48	24	17	7	20	139	139	0	55
9	SE	Winnipeg Jets	48	24	21	3	22	128	144	−16	51
10	AT	Philadelphia Flyers	48	23	22	3	22	133	141	−8	49
11	AT	New Jersey Devils	48	19	19	10	17	112	129	−17	48
12	NE	Buffalo Sabres	48	21	21	6	14	115	143	−28	48
13	SE	Carolina Hurricanes	48	19	25	4	18	128	160	−32	42
14	SE	Tampa Bay Lightning	48	18	26	4	17	148	150	−2	40
15	SE	Florida Panthers	48	15	27	6	12	112	171	−59	36

Source: National Hockey League
x – Clinched playoff spot; y – Clinched division; z – Clinched conference

== Schedule and results ==
=== Revised regular season schedule ===
2012–13 Schedule 29–14–5 (Home: 10–4–3; Road: 12–3–2)
January: 4–2–0 (Home: 3–1–0; Road: 1–1–0), 8 Points

#	Jan	Time (ET)	Visitor	Score	Home	Location/Attendance	Record	Points
1	19	7:00 pm	Toronto Maple Leafs	2–1	Montreal Canadiens	Bell Centre (21,273)	0–1–0	0
2	22	7:30 pm	Florida Panthers	1–4	Montreal Canadiens	Bell Centre (21,273)	1–1–0	2
3	24	7:00 pm	Montreal Canadiens	4–1	Washington Capitals	Verizon Center (18,506)	2–1–0	4
4	27	6:00 pm	New Jersey Devils	3–4(OT)	Montreal Canadiens	Bell Centre (21,273)	3–1–0	6
5	29	7:30 pm	Winnipeg Jets	3–4	Montreal Canadiens	Bell Centre (21,273)	4–1–0	8
6	30	7:00 pm	Montreal Canadiens	1–5	Ottawa Senators	Scotiabank Place (19,620)	4–2–0	8
Legend: = Win = Loss = OT/SO Loss

February: 9–2–3 (Home: 4–2–1; Road: 3–0–2), 21 Points

#	Feb	Time (ET)	Visitor	Score	Home	Location/Attendance	Record	Points
7	2	2:00 pm	Buffalo Sabres	1–6	Montreal Canadiens	Bell Centre (21,273)	5–2–0	10
8	3	2:00 pm	Ottawa Senators	1–2	Montreal Canadiens	Bell Centre (21,273)	6–2–0	12
9	6	7:30 pm	Boston Bruins	2–1	Montreal Canadiens	Bell Centre (21,273)	6–3–0	12
10	7	7:00 pm	Montreal Canadiens	4–5 (SO)	Buffalo Sabres	First Niagara Center (18,866)	6–3–1	13
11	9	7:00 pm	Toronto Maple Leafs	6–0	Montreal Canadiens	Bell Centre (21,273)	6–4–1	13
12	12	7:30 pm	Montreal Canadiens	4–3(SO)	Tampa Bay Lightning	Tampa Bay Times Forum (19,204)	7–4–1	15
13	14	7:30 pm	Montreal Canadiens	1–0(OT)	Florida Panthers	BB&T Center (17,204)	8–4–1	17
14	16	7:00 pm	Philadelphia Flyers	1–4	Montreal Canadiens	Bell Centre (21,273)	9–4–1	19
15	18	7:30 pm	Carolina Hurricanes	0–3	Montreal Canadiens	Bell Centre (21,273)	10–4–1	21
16	19	7:00 pm	Montreal Canadiens	3–1	New York Rangers	Madison Square Garden (17,200)	11–4–1	23
17	21	7:30 pm	New York Islanders	4–3(OT)	Montreal Canadiens	Bell Centre (21,273)	11–4–2	24
18	23	7:00 pm	New York Rangers	0–3	Montreal Canadiens	Bell Centre (21,273)	12–4–2	26
19	25	7:30 pm	Montreal Canadiens	1–2(SO)	Ottawa Senators	Scotiabank Place (19,218)	12–4–3	27
20	27	7:30 pm	Montreal Canadiens	5–2	Toronto Maple Leafs	Air Canada Centre (19,625)	13–4–3	29
Legend: = Win = Loss = OT/SO Loss

March: 9–3–2 (Home: 2–1–2; Road: 7–2–0), 20 Points

#	Mar	Time (ET)	Visitor	Score	Home	Location/Attendance	Record	Points
21	2	7:00 pm	Pittsburgh Penguins	7–6(OT)	Montreal Canadiens	Bell Centre (21,273)	13–4–4	30
22	3	7:30 pm	Montreal Canadiens	4–3	Boston Bruins	TD Garden (17,565)	14–4–4	32
23	5	7:00 pm	Montreal Canadiens	3–6	New York Islanders	Nassau Coliseum (9,498)	14–5–4	32
24	7	7:00 pm	Montreal Canadiens	4–2	Carolina Hurricanes	PNC Arena (16,774)	15–5–4	34
25	9	7:00 pm	Montreal Canadiens	4–3	Tampa Bay Lightning	Tampa Bay Times Forum (19,204)	16–5–4	36
26	10	6:00 pm	Montreal Canadiens	5–2	Florida Panthers	BB&T Center (19,189)	17–5–4	38
27	13	7:00 pm	Ottawa Senators	3–4(SO)	Montreal Canadiens	Bell Centre (21,273)	18–5–4	40
28	16	7:00 pm	Montreal Canadiens	2–1	New Jersey Devils	Prudential Center (17,625)	19–5–4	42
29	19	7:30 pm	Buffalo Sabres	3–2(OT)	Montreal Canadiens	Bell Centre (21,273)	19–5–5	43
30	21	7:00 pm	Montreal Canadiens	5–2	New York Islanders	Nassau Veterans Memorial Coliseum (11,012)	20–5–5	45
31	23	7:00 pm	Buffalo Sabres	2–1	Montreal Canadiens	Bell Centre (21,273)	20–6–5	45
32	26	7:00 pm	Montreal Canadiens	0–1	Pittsburgh Penguins	Consol Energy Center (18,646)	20–7–5	45
33	27	7:30 pm	Montreal Canadiens	6–5(SO)	Boston Bruins	TD Garden (17,565)	21–7–5	47
34	30	7:00 pm	New York Rangers	0–3	Montreal Canadiens	Bell Centre (21,273)	22–7–5	49
Legend: = Win = Loss = OT/SO Loss

April: 7–7–0 (Home: 4–3–0; Road: 3–4–0), 14 Points

#	Apr	Time (ET)	Visitor	Score	Home	Location/Attendance	Record	Points
35	1	7:30 pm	Carolina Hurricanes	1–4	Montreal Canadiens	Bell Centre (21,273)	23–7–5	51
36	3	7:30 pm	Montreal Canadiens	3–5	Philadelphia Flyers	Wells Fargo Center (19,537)	23–8–5	51
37	4	7:30 pm	Winnipeg Jets	1–4	Montreal Canadiens	Bell Centre (21,273)	24–8–5	53
38	6	7:00 pm	Boston Bruins	1–2	Montreal Canadiens	Bell Centre (21,273)	25–8–5	55
39	9	7:30 pm	Washington Capitals	3–2	Montreal Canadiens	Bell Centre (21,273)	25–9–5	55
40	11	7:30 pm	Montreal Canadiens	5–1	Buffalo Sabres	First Niagara Center (19,070)	26–9–5	57
41	13	7:00 pm	Montreal Canadiens	1–5	Toronto Maple Leafs	Air Canada Centre (19,625)	26–10–5	57
42	15	7:30 pm	Philadelphia Flyers	7–3	Montreal Canadiens	Bell Centre (21,273)	26–11–5	57
43	17	7:00 pm	Montreal Canadiens	4–6	Pittsburgh Penguins	Consol Energy Center (18,626)	26–12–5	57
44	18	7:30 pm	Tampa Bay Lightning	2–3	Montreal Canadiens	Bell Centre (21,273)	27–12–5	59
45	20	7:00 pm	Washington Capitals	5–1	Montreal Canadiens	Bell Centre (21,273)	27–13–5	59
46	23	7:00 pm	Montreal Canadiens	2–3	New Jersey Devils	Prudential Center (17,625)	27–14–5	59
47	25	8:00 pm	Montreal Canadiens	4–2	Winnipeg Jets	MTS Centre	28–14–5	61
48	27	7:00 pm	Montreal Canadiens	4–1	Toronto Maple Leafs	Air Canada Centre	29–14–5	63
Legend: = Win = Loss = OT/SO Loss

== Playoffs ==
The Montreal Canadiens entered the playoffs as the second seed in the Eastern Conference by winning the Northeast Division with 63 points. The Ottawa Senators earned 56 points during the regular season, losing the tiebreaker to the New York Rangers in regulation + overtime wins (22 to 21) to finish seventh overall in the Eastern Conference. This was the first playoff series between these two teams, and the first playoff series between teams from Montreal and Ottawa since 1928, when the Montreal Maroons defeated the original Ottawa Senators in the Canadian Division Quarterfinals. The two teams split their four-game regular season series. The Senators would defeat the Canadiens in five games.

2013 Stanley Cup playoffs
Eastern Conference Quarterfinals – Ottawa wins series 4–1

#	Date	Time (ET)	Visitor	Score	Home	Location/Attendance	Series
1	May 2	7:00 pm	Ottawa Senators	4–2	Montreal Canadiens	Bell Centre (21,273)	Senators lead 1–0
2	May 3	7:00 pm	Ottawa Senators	1–3	Montreal Canadiens	Bell Centre (21,273)	Series tied 1–1
3	May 5	7:00 pm	Montreal Canadiens	1–6	Ottawa Senators	Scotiabank Place (20,249)	Senators lead 2–1
4	May 7	7:00 pm	Montreal Canadiens	2–3 OT	Ottawa Senators	Scotiabank Place (20,500)	Senators lead 3–1
5	May 9	7:00 pm	Ottawa Senators	6–1	Montreal Canadiens	Bell Centre (21,273)	Senators win 4–1
Legend: = Win = Loss

== Player statistics ==
Final stats

=== Skaters ===
Regular season
Player	GP	G	A	Pts	+/-	PIM
Max Pacioretty	44	15	24	39	8	28
P. K. Subban	42	11	27	38	12	57
Tomas Plekanec	47	14	19	33	3	24
Andrei Markov	48	10	20	30	−9	14
Lars Eller	46	8	22	30	8	45
David Desharnais	48	10	18	28	−2	26
Brendan Gallagher	44	15	13	28	10	33
Alex Galchenyuk	48	9	18	27	14	20
Brian Gionta	48	14	12	26	3	8
Michael Ryder^{†}	27	10	11	21	−2	8
Brandon Prust	38	5	9	14	11	110
Raphael Diaz	23	1	13	14	4	6
Rene Bourque	27	7	6	13	−1	32
Alexei Emelin	38	3	9	12	2	33
Francis Bouillon	48	1	8	9	4	21
Josh Gorges	48	2	7	9	4	15
Travis Moen	45	2	4	6	−4	32
Erik Cole^{‡}	19	3	3	6	1	10
Colby Armstrong	37	2	3	5	1	12
Tomas Kaberle	10	0	3	3	4	0
Davis Drewiske^{†}	9	1	2	3	0	0
Gabriel Dumont	10	1	2	3	1	13
Jeff Halpern^{†}	16	1	1	2	−3	2
Yannick Weber	6	0	2	2	−1	2
Jarred Tinordi	8	0	2	2	5	2
Nathan Beaulieu	6	0	2	2	5	0
Ryan White	26	1	0	1	1	67
Mike Blunden	5	0	0	0	−1	4
Greg Pateryn	3	0	0	0	0	0

Playoffs
Player	GP	G	A	Pts	+/-	PIM
Tomas Plekanec	5	0	4	4	−5	2
P. K. Subban	5	2	2	4	−1	31
Rene Bourque	5	2	1	3	−1	10
Alex Galchenyuk	5	1	2	3	−4	0
Michael Ryder	5	1	1	2	0	2
Brendan Gallagher	5	2	0	2	−7	5
Brian Gionta	2	0	1	1	−2	0
Andrei Markov	5	0	1	1	−1	0
Jeff Halpern	3	0	1	1	1	0
Brandon Prust	4	0	1	1	−3	14
David Desharnais	5	0	1	1	1	2
Ryan White	3	1	0	1	−1	23
Jarred Tinordi	5	0	1	1	−3	15
Francis Bouillon	5	0	0	0	−3	17
Travis Moen	5	0	0	0	−2	17
Colby Armstrong	4	0	0	0	−1	15
Josh Gorges	5	0	0	0	−4	4
Mike Blunden	1	0	0	0	0	10
Max Pacioretty	4	0	0	0	0	4
Lars Eller	1	0	0	0	0	0
Gabriel Dumont	3	0	0	0	0	12
Raphael Diaz	5	0	0	0	−4	0

=== Goaltenders ===
Regular season
Player	GP	GS	TOI	W	L	OT	GA	GAA	SA	SV%	SO	G	A	PIM
Carey Price	39	38	2249:01	21	13	4	97	2.59	1018	.905	3	0	0	0
Peter Budaj	13	10	656:29	8	1	1	25	2.29	273	.908	1	0	0	0
Totals		48	2905:30	29	14	5	122	2.52	1291	.905	4	0	0	0

Playoffs
Player	GP	GS	TOI	W	L	GA	GAA	SA	SV%	SO	G	A	PIM
Carey Price	4	4	239:05	1	2	13	3.26	123	.894	0	0	0	0
Peter Budaj	2	1	62:32	0	2	7	6.67	31	.774	0	0	0	0

^{†}Denotes player spent time with another team before joining the Canadiens. Stats reflect time with the Canadiens only.
^{‡}Denotes player was traded mid-season. Stats reflect time with the Canadiens only.
Bold/italics denotes franchise record

== Suspensions/fines ==
Player	Explanation	Length	Salary	Date issued	Ref
Ryan White	Illegal check to the head of Flyers defenceman Kent Huskins	5 games	$18,581.10	April 17, 2013	

== Awards and honours ==
=== Awards ===
Regular season
Player	Award	Awarded
P. K. Subban	James Norris Memorial Trophy	June 15, 2013

=== Milestones ===
Regular season
Player	Milestone	Reached
Alex Galchenyuk	1st Career NHL Game	January 19, 2013
Alex Galchenyuk	1st Career NHL Goal; 1st Career NHL Point	January 22, 2013
Brendan Gallagher	1st Career NHL Game; 1st Career NHL Assist; 1st Career NHL Point	January 22, 2013
Alex Galchenyuk	1st Career NHL Assist	January 27, 2013
Brendan Gallagher	1st Career NHL Goal	January 27, 2013
Brandon Prust	300th Career NHL Game	March 2, 2013
Francis Bouillon	700th Career NHL Game	March 7, 2013
Greg Pateryn	1st Career NHL Game	March 9, 2013
Andrei Markov	300th Career NHL Assist	March 10, 2013
Gabriel Dumont	1st Career NHL Assist; 1st Career NHL Point	March 13, 2013
Jarred Tinordi	1st Career NHL Game; 1st Career NHL Assist; 1st Career NHL Point	March 16, 2013
David Desharnais	100th Career NHL Point	March 21, 2013
Travis Moen	600th Career NHL Game	March 23, 2013
Nathan Beaulieu	1st Career NHL Game	March 30, 2013
Nathan Beaulieu	1st Career NHL Assist; 1st Career NHL Point	April 1, 2013
Carey Price	300th Career NHL Game	April 1, 2013
Jeff Halpern	900th Career NHL Game	April 11, 2013
Gabriel Dumont	1st Career NHL Goal	April 17, 2013
Lars Eller	200th Career NHL Game	April 23, 2013
P. K. Subban	200th Career NHL Game	April 23, 2013

Playoffs
Player	Milestone	Reached
Alex Galchenyuk	1st Career Playoff Game; 1st Career Playoff Assist; 1st Career Playoff Point	May 2, 2013
Raphael Diaz	1st Career Playoff Game	May 2, 2013
Brendan Gallagher	1st Career Playoff Game; 1st Career Playoff Goal; 1st Career Playoff Point	May 2, 2013
Ryan White	1st Career Playoff Goal; 1st Career Playoff Point	May 3, 2013
Gabriel Dumont	1st Career Playoff Game	May 3, 2013
Alex Galchenyuk	1st Career Playoff Goal	May 7, 2013
Mike Blunden	1st Career Playoff Game	May 9, 2013

== Transactions ==
The Canadiens have been involved in the following transactions during the 2012–13 season:

=== Trades ===
Date	Details	
January 14, 2013	To Florida Panthers Brendon Nash	To Montreal Canadiens Jason DeSantis
February 14, 2013	To Tampa Bay Lightning Cedrick Desjardins	To Montreal Canadiens Dustin Tokarski
February 26, 2013	To Dallas Stars Erik Cole	To Montreal Canadiens Michael Ryder; 3rd round-pick in 2013
April 2, 2013	To Los Angeles Kings 5th round-pick in 2013	To Montreal Canadiens Davis Drewiske

=== Free agents acquired ===
Player	Former team	Contract terms
Brandon Prust	New York Rangers	4 years, $10 million
Cedrick Desjardins	Lake Erie Monsters	1 year, $600,000
Francis Bouillon	Nashville Predators	1 year, $1.5 million
Colby Armstrong	Toronto Maple Leafs	1 year, $1 million
Mike Condon	Princeton University	2 years, $1.36 million entry-level contract

=== Free agents lost ===
Player	New team	Contract terms
Garrett Stafford	Washington Capitals	1 year
Brian Willsie	TPS	1 year
Andreas Engqvist	Atlant Moscow Oblast	undisclosed
Brad Staubitz	Anaheim Ducks	2 years, $1.275 million
Scott Gomez	San Jose Sharks	1 year, $700,000
Nathan Lawson	Ottawa Senators	1 year, two-way contract
Chris Campoli	EHC Biel	1 year
Joe Callahan	Abbotsford Heat	1 year
Mark Mitera	Reading Royals	1 year
Tomas Kaberle	HC Kladno	1 year
Erik Nystrom	Medvescak Zagreb	1 year

=== Claimed via waivers ===
Player	Former team	Date claimed off waivers
Jeff Halpern	New York Rangers	March 23, 2013

=== Lost via waivers ===
Player	New team	Date claimed off waivers
Aaron Palushaj	Colorado Avalanche	February 5, 2013

=== Player signings ===
Player	Date	Contract terms
Steve Quailer	June 14, 2012	2 years, $1.3 million entry-level contract
Ryan White	June 26, 2012	1 year, $687,500
Petteri Nokelainen	June 29, 2012	1 year, $575,000
Brendon Nash	June 29, 2012	1 year, $575,000
Travis Moen	June 29, 2012	4 years, $7.2 million
Alexei Emelin	June 30, 2012	2 years, $4 million
Mike Blunden	July 1, 2012	1 year, $575,000
Carey Price	July 2, 2012	6 years, $39 million
Frederic St. Denis	July 5, 2012	1 year, $575,000
Lars Eller	July 6, 2012	2 years, $2.65 million
Aaron Palushaj	July 12, 2012	1 year, $600,000
Raphael Diaz	July 13, 2012	2 years, $2.45 million
Blake Geoffrion	July 16, 2012	1 year, $803,250
Alex Galchenyuk	July 23, 2012	3 years, $2.775 million entry-level contract
Max Pacioretty	August 13, 2012	6 years, $27 million contract extension
P. K. Subban	January 28, 2013	2 years, $5.75 million
David Desharnais	March 15, 2013	4 years, $14 million contract extension
Darren Dietz	March 17, 2013	3 years, $1.995 million entry-level contract
Francis Bouillon	March 20, 2013	1 year, $1.5 million contract extension
Danny Kristo	April 3, 2013	2 years, $1.75 million entry-level contract
Peter Budaj	April 10, 2013	2 years, $2.8 million contract extension
Magnus Nygren	May 21, 2013	2 years, $1.7175 million entry-level contract
Sebastian Collberg	May 21, 2013	3 years, $2.775 million entry-level contract
Tim Bozon	May 30, 2013	3 years, $2.0275 million entry-level contract
Davis Drewiske	June 13, 2013	2 years, $1.275 million contract extension
Mike Blunden	June 28, 2013	1 year, $550,000 contract extension

== Draft picks ==
Below are the Montreal Canadiens' picks at the 2012 NHL entry draft, held in Pittsburgh, Pennsylvania on June 22 & 23, 2012.

Round	#	Player	Pos	Nationality	College/Junior/Club team (League)
1	3	Alex Galchenyuk	C	United States	Sarnia Sting (OHL)
2	33	Sebastian Collberg	RW	Sweden	Frolunda HC (Elitserien)
2	51^{[a]}	Dalton Thrower	D	Canada	Saskatoon Blades (WHL)
3	64	Tim Bozon	LW	United States	Kamloops Blazers (WHL)
4	94	Brady Vail	C	United States	Windsor Spitfires (OHL)
5	122^{[b]}	Charles Hudon	LW	Canada	Chicoutimi Sagueneens (QMJHL)
6	154	Erik Nystrom	LW	Sweden	Modo Hockey Jr. (J20 SuperElit)

=== Notes ===
- ^{a} The Nashville Predators' second-round pick went to the Montreal Canadiens as a result of a February 17, 2012, trade that sent Hal Gill and a 2013 conditional fifth-round pick (if Blake Geoffrion plays 40 NHL games in 2012–13) to the Predators in exchange for Blake Geoffrion, Robert Slaney and this pick.
- ^{b} The Columbus Blue Jackets' fifth-round pick went to the Montreal Canadiens as a result of a June 29, 2011, trade that sent James Wisniewski to the Blue Jackets in exchange for this pick.
