= 2012–13 New Jersey Devils season =

National Hockey League season

2012–13 New Jersey Devils
- Division: 5th Atlantic
- Conference: 11th Eastern
- 2012–13 record: 19–19–10
- Home record: 13–9–2
- Road record: 6–10–8
- Goals for: 112
- Goals against: 129

Team information
- General manager: Lou Lamoriello
- Coach: Peter DeBoer
- Captain: Bryce Salvador
- Alternate captains: Patrik Elias; Ilya Kovalchuk
- Arena: Prudential Center
- Average attendance: 17,298 (98.1%) (16 games)

Team leaders
- Goals: David Clarkson (15)
- Assists: Patrik Elias (22)
- Points: Patrik Elias (36)
- Penalty minutes: David Clarkson (78)
- Plus/minus: Andy Greene (+12)
- Wins: Martin Brodeur (13)
- Goals against average: Brodeur (2.22)

The 2012–13 New Jersey Devils season was the 39th season for the National Hockey League (NHL) franchise that was established on June 11, 1974, and 31st season since the franchise relocated from Colorado prior to the 1982–83 NHL season. The regular season was reduced from its usual 82 games to 48 due to a lockout.

The defending Stanley Cup runners-up were eliminated from the playoff race after a 4–1 loss to the New York Rangers on April 21, 2013.

== Off-season ==
Entering the off season, the Devils were faced with a major dilemma of having over ten unrestricted free agents, including captain Zach Parise. The Devils were able to resign goaltenders Martin Brodeur and Johan Hedberg, defenseman Bryce Salvador and several others, but lost Parise to the Minnesota Wild.

== Pre-season ==
On July 19, the New Jersey Devils announced their 2012 pre-season schedule. The team would have played seven pre-season games, including a game against the New York Islanders at the Barclays Center in Brooklyn, but all pre-season games were eventually cancelled due to the lockout.

== Regular season ==
On June 21, the New Jersey Devils announced their schedule for the 2012–13 regular season. Their regular season would have begun on October 12 at the Washington Capitals, and their home-opener would have taken place the following night against the Boston Bruins. The original schedule would have ended with a game at the New York Islanders on April 13. A new schedule would need to be released if the lockout is resolved. On April 15, the Devils lost 2–0 to the Toronto Maple Leafs, their 10th loss in a row (0–6–4), which was equal to the franchise loss record set in 1983–84.

For the second consecutive season, the Devils led the League in shorthanded goals scored, as they scored 11 shorthanded goals in the 48-game regular season. However, after a 4–1 loss to their Hudson rival, the New York Rangers, on April 21, the Devils were eliminated from the playoff race, despite making it to the Stanley Cup Final the previous year against the eventual champions, the Los Angeles Kings. This was the first time a Stanley Cup finalist missed the playoffs the next season since 2007.

== Standings ==
Atlantic Division
Pos	Team	GP	W	L	OTL	ROW	GF	GA	GD	Pts
1	Pittsburgh Penguins	48	36	12	0	33	165	119	+46	72
2	New York Rangers	48	26	18	4	22	130	112	+18	56
3	New York Islanders	48	24	17	7	20	139	139	0	55
4	Philadelphia Flyers	48	23	22	3	22	133	141	−8	49
5	New Jersey Devils	48	19	19	10	17	112	129	−17	48

Source: National Hockey League

Eastern Conference
Pos	Div	Team	GP	W	L	OTL	ROW	GF	GA	GD	Pts
1	AT	z – Pittsburgh Penguins	48	36	12	0	33	165	119	+46	72
2	NE	y – Montreal Canadiens	48	29	14	5	26	149	126	+23	63
3	SE	y – Washington Capitals	48	27	18	3	24	149	130	+19	57
4	NE	x – Boston Bruins	48	28	14	6	24	131	109	+22	62
5	NE	x – Toronto Maple Leafs	48	26	17	5	26	145	133	+12	57
6	AT	x – New York Rangers	48	26	18	4	22	130	112	+18	56
7	NE	x – Ottawa Senators	48	25	17	6	21	116	104	+12	56
8	AT	x – New York Islanders	48	24	17	7	20	139	139	0	55
9	SE	Winnipeg Jets	48	24	21	3	22	128	144	−16	51
10	AT	Philadelphia Flyers	48	23	22	3	22	133	141	−8	49
11	AT	New Jersey Devils	48	19	19	10	17	112	129	−17	48
12	NE	Buffalo Sabres	48	21	21	6	14	115	143	−28	48
13	SE	Carolina Hurricanes	48	19	25	4	18	128	160	−32	42
14	SE	Tampa Bay Lightning	48	18	26	4	17	148	150	−2	40
15	SE	Florida Panthers	48	15	27	6	12	112	171	−59	36

Source: National Hockey League
x – Clinched playoff spot; y – Clinched division; z – Clinched conference

== Schedule and results ==
=== Regular season ===
2012–13 Regular Season Game Log
January: 3–0–3 (Home: 2–0–1; Road: 1–0–2)

Game	Date	Visitor	Score	Home	Decision	OT	Attendance	Record	Points
1	January 19	New Jersey	2–1	New York Islanders	W		16,170	1–0–0	2
2	January 22	Philadelphia	0–3	New Jersey	W		17,625	2–0–0	4
3	January 25	Washington	2–3	New Jersey	W	OT	17,625	3–0–0	6
4	January 27	New Jersey	3–4	Montreal	OTL	OT	21,273	3–0–1	7
5	January 29	New Jersey	1–2	Boston	OTL	SO	17,565	3–0–2	8
6	January 31	New York Islanders	5–4	New Jersey	OTL	OT	17,625	3–0–3	9

February: 7–6–1 (Home: 4–2–1; Road: 3–4–0)

Game	Date	Visitor	Score	Home	Decision	OT	Attendance	Record	Points
7	February 2	New Jersey	1–5	Pittsburgh	L		18,635	3–1–3	9
8	February 3	New Jersey	3–0	New York Islanders	W		11,558	4–1–3	11
9	February 5	New York Rangers	1–3	New Jersey	W		17,625	5–1–3	13
10	February 7	Tampa Bay	2–4	New Jersey	W		14,802	6–1–3	15
11	February 9	Pittsburgh	1–3	New Jersey	W		17,625	7–1–3	17
12	February 10	New Jersey	3–1	Pittsburgh	W		18,658	8–1–3	19
13	February 12	Carolina	4–2	New Jersey	L		17,625	8–2–3	19
14	February 15	Philadelphia	3–5	New Jersey	W		17,625	9–2–3	21
15	February 16	New Jersey	1–5	New York Islanders	L		15,488	9–3–3	21
16	February 18	Ottawa	2–1	New Jersey	OTL	SO	17,625	9–3–4	22
17	February 21	New Jersey	3–2	Washington	W		18,506	10–3–4	24
18	February 23	New Jersey	1–5	Washington	L		18,506	10–4–4	24
19	February 24	Winnipeg	4–2	New Jersey	L		17,625	10–5–4	24
20	February 28	New Jersey	1–3	Winnipeg	L		15,004	10–6–4	24

March: 5–5–5 (Home: 4–3–0; Road: 1–2–5)

Game	Date	Visitor	Score	Home	Decision	OT	Attendance	Record	Points
21	March 2	New Jersey	3–4	Buffalo	OTL	SO	19,070	10–6–5	25
22	March 4	New Jersey	2–4	Toronto	L		19,435	10–7–5	25
23	March 5	Tampa Bay	5–2	New Jersey	L		15,229	10–8–5	25
24	March 7	Buffalo	2–3	New Jersey	W	SO	17,625	11–8–5	27
25	March 9	New Jersey	3–6	Carolina	L		18,680	11–9–5	27
26	March 10	Winnipeg	2–3	New Jersey	W	SO	17,625	12–9–5	29
27	March 13	Philadelphia	2–5	New Jersey	W		17,625	13–9–5	31
28	March 15	New Jersey	1–2	Philadelphia	OTL	SO	19,971	13–9–6	32
29	March 16	Montreal	2–1	New Jersey	L		17,625	13–10–6	32
30	March 19	New York Rangers	3–2	New Jersey	L		17,625	13–11–6	32
31	March 21	New Jersey	4–1	Carolina	W		16,941	14–11–6	34
32	March 23	Florida	1–2	New Jersey	W		17,625	15–11–6	36
33	March 25	New Jersey	2–3	Ottawa	OTL	SO	18,902	15–11–7	37
34	March 29	New Jersey	4–5	Tampa Bay	OTL	SO	19,204	15–11–8	38
35	March 30	New Jersey	4–5	Florida	OTL	OT	18,138	15–11–9	39

April: 4–8–1 (Home: 3–4–0; Road: 1–4–1)

Game	Date	Visitor	Score	Home	Decision	OT	Attendance	Record	Points
36	April 1	New York Islanders	3–1	New Jersey	L		17,625	15–12–9	39
37	April 4	New Jersey	0–1	Boston	L		17,565	15–13–9	39
38	April 6	Toronto	2–1	New Jersey	L		17,625	15–14–9	39
39	April 7	New Jersey	2–3	Buffalo	OTL	SO	18,703	15–14–10	40
40	April 10	Boston	5–4	New Jersey	L		17,625	15–15–10	40
41	April 12	Ottawa	2–0	New Jersey	L		16,099	15–16–10	40
42	April 15	New Jersey	0–2	Toronto	L		19,425	15–17–10	40
43	April 18	New Jersey	3–0	Philadelphia	W		19,727	16–17–10	42
44	April 20	Florida	2–6	New Jersey	W		16,018	17–17–10	44
45	April 21	New Jersey	1–4	New York Rangers	L		17,200	17–18–10	44
46	April 23	Montreal	2–3	New Jersey	W		15,219	18–18–10	46
47	April 25	Pittsburgh	2–3	New Jersey	W		16122	19–18–10	48
48	April 27	New Jersey	0–4	New York Rangers	L		17,200	19–19–10	48

Legend: Win (2 points) Loss (0 points) Overtime/shootout loss (1 point)

== Player statistics ==
Final stats

Skaters

Regular season
Player	GP	G	A	Pts	+/-	PIM
Patrik Elias	48	14	22	36	5	22
Ilya Kovalchuk	37	11	20	31	−6	18
David Clarkson	48	15	9	24	−6	78
Travis Zajac	48	7	13	20	−5	22
Marek Zidlicky	48	4	15	19	−12	38
Andy Greene	48	4	12	16	12	20
Adam Henrique	42	11	5	16	−3	16
Steve Bernier	47	8	7	15	−7	17
Ryan Carter	44	6	9	15	−2	31
Stephen Gionta	48	4	10	14	2	14
Andrei Loktionov	28	8	4	12	−2	4
Dainius Zubrus	22	2	7	9	−3	12
Alexei Ponikarovsky^{†}	30	2	5	7	1	8
Mark Fayne	31	1	5	6	6	16
Adam Larsson	37	0	6	6	4	12
Steve Sullivan^{†}	9	2	3	5	−4	4
Anton Volchenkov	37	1	4	5	−1	37
Peter Harrold	23	2	3	5	−8	6
Henrik Tallinder	25	1	3	4	0	10
Matt D'Agostini^{†}	13	2	2	4	−1	6
Jacob Josefson	22	1	2	3	−10	2
Stefan Matteau	17	1	2	3	−1	6
Bryce Salvador	39	0	2	2	−12	22
Bobby Butler^{‡}	14	1	1	2	−6	0
Tom Kostopoulos	15	1	0	1	0	18
Matt Anderson	2	0	1	1	1	0
Mattias Tedenby	4	0	1	1	0	2
Krys Barch	22	0	0	0	1	44
Cam Janssen	4	0	0	0	−1	2
Tim Sestito	6	0	0	0	1	2
Eric Gelinas	1	0	0	0	−1	0
Alexander Urbom	1	0	0	0	−1	0
Harri Pesonen	4	0	0	0	−1	2
Totals		109	173	282	−60	489

Goaltenders

Regular season
Player	GP	GS	TOI	W	L	OT	GA	GAA	SA	SV%	SO	G	A	PIM
Martin Brodeur	29	29	1757:21	13	9	7	65	2.22	654	.901	2	1	2	0
Johan Hedberg	19	19	1108:16	6	10	3	51	2.76	435	.883	1	0	1	4
Keith Kinkaid	1	0	25:45	0	0	0	1	2.31	13	.923	0	0	0	0
Jeff Frazee	1	0	18:36	0	0	0	0	0.00	3	1.000	0	0	0	0
Totals		48	2909:58	19	19	10	117	2.41	1105	.894	3	1	3	4

^{†}Denotes player spent time with another team before joining the Devils. Stats reflect time with the Devils only.
^{‡}Denotes player was traded mid-season. Stats reflect time with the Devils only.
Bold/italics denotes franchise record

== Notable achievements ==
=== Awards ===
Regular season
Player	Award	Awarded
Martin Brodeur	NHL Third Star of the Week	February 10, 2013

=== Milestones ===
Regular season
Player	Milestone	Reached
Patrik Elias	900th Career NHL Point	January 27, 2013
Matt Anderson	1st Career NHL Game	January 29, 2013
Harri Pesonen	1st Career NHL Game	March 16, 2013
Eric Gelinas	1st Career NHL Game	April 25, 2013

== Transactions ==
The Devils have been involved in the following transactions during the 2012–13 season.

=== Trades ===
Date	Details
February 6, 2013	To Los Angeles Kings 5th-round pick in 2013	To New Jersey Devils Andrei Loktionov
February 13, 2013	To Winnipeg Jets 7th-round pick in 2013; 4th-round pick in 2014	To New Jersey Devils Alexei Ponikarovsky
March 22, 2013	To St. Louis Blues Conditional 5th-round pick in 2015	To New Jersey Devils Matt D'Agostini; Conditional 7th-round pick in 2015
April 3, 2013	To Phoenix Coyotes 7th-round pick in 2014	To New Jersey Devils Steve Sullivan

=== Free agents signed ===
Player	Former team	Contract terms
Krys Barch	Florida Panthers	2 years, $1.5 million
Bobby Butler	Ottawa Senators	1 year, $525,000

=== Free agents lost ===
Player	New team	Contract terms
Alexei Ponikarovsky	Winnipeg Jets	1 year, $1.8 million
Eric Boulton	New York Islanders	1 year, $540,000
Vladimir Zharkov	CSKA Moscow	2 years
Zach Parise	Minnesota Wild	13 years, $98 million
Matt Taormina	Tampa Bay Lightning	1 year, $700,000

=== Claimed via waivers ===
Player	Former team	Date claimed off waivers
Tom Kostopoulos	Pittsburgh Penguins	March 6, 2013

=== Lost via waivers ===
Player	New team	Date claimed off waivers
Bobby Butler	Nashville Predators	March 4, 2013

=== Player signings ===
Player	Date	Contract terms
Steve Bernier	June 29, 2012	2 years, $1.5 million
Ryan Carter	June 29, 2012	2 years, $1.55 million
Stephen Gionta	June 29, 2012	2 years, $1.125 million
Peter Harrold	June 29, 2012	1 year, $525,000
Cam Janssen	June 29, 2012	1 year, $575,000
Martin Brodeur	July 2, 2012	2 years, $9 million
Johan Hedberg	July 2, 2012	2 years, $2.8 million
Bryce Salvador	July 3, 2012	3 years, $9.5 million
Stefan Matteau	August 14, 2012	3 years, $2.5275 million entry-level contract
Reece Scarlett	September 6, 2012	3 years, $1.86 million entry-level contract
Damon Severson	September 6, 2012	3 years, $1.9275 million entry-level contract
Travis Zajac	January 16, 2013	8 years, $46 million contract extension
Reid Boucher	March 13, 2013	3 years, $2.0775 million entry-level contract
Mattias Tedenby	June 20, 2013	1 year, $600,000

== Draft picks ==
The New Jersey Devils picks at the 2012 NHL entry draft in Pittsburgh, Pennsylvania.

Round	#	Player	Pos	Nationality	College/Junior/Club team (League)
1	29	Stefan Matteau	C	United States	U.S. National Team Development Program (USHL)
2	60	Damon Severson	D	Canada	Kelowna Rockets (WHL)
3	90	Ben Johnson	C/LW	United States	Windsor Spitfires (OHL)
4	96^{[a]}	Ben Thomson	LW	Canada	Kitchener Rangers (OHL)
5	135^{[b]}	Graham Black	C	Canada	Swift Current Broncos (WHL)
5	150	Alexander Kerfoot	C	Canada	Coquitlam Express (BCHL)
6	180	Artur Gavrus	C	Belarus	Owen Sound Attack (OHL)

Draft notes

- The Devils' fourth-round pick went to the Carolina Hurricanes as the result of a January 20, 2012, trade that sent Alexei Ponikarovsky to the Devils in exchange for Joe Sova and this pick.
- ^{a} The Toronto Maple Leafs' fourth-round pick went to the New Jersey Devils as a result of an October 4, 2011, trade that sent Dave Steckel to the Maple Leafs in exchange for this pick.
- ^{b} The Calgary Flames' fifth-round pick went to the New Jersey Devils as a result of a July 14, 2011, trade that sent Pierre-Luc Letourneau-Leblond to the Flames in exchange for this pick.
- The Devils' seventh-round pick went to the Anaheim Ducks as the result of a December 12, 2011, trade that sent Kurtis Foster and Timo Pielmeier to the Devils in exchange for Rod Pelley, Mark Fraser and this pick.

== See also ==
- 2012–13 NHL season
