= 2012–13 Toronto Maple Leafs season =

NHL hockey team season

2012–13 Toronto Maple Leafs
- Division: 3rd Northeast
- Conference: 5th Eastern
- 2012–13 record: 26–17–5
- Home record: 13–9–2
- Road record: 13–8–3
- Goals for: 144
- Goals against: 129

Team information
- General manager: Dave Nonis
- Coach: Randy Carlyle
- Captain: Dion Phaneuf
- Alternate captains: Joffrey Lupul; Clarke MacArthur; Jay McClement
- Arena: Air Canada Centre
- Average attendance: 19,305 (102.6%)

Team leaders
- Goals: Phil Kessel (20)
- Assists: Phil Kessel (32)
- Points: Phil Kessel (52)
- Penalty minutes: Colton Orr (155)
- Plus/minus: Mark Fraser (+19)
- Wins: James Reimer (19)
- Goals against average: James Reimer (2.38)

The 2012–13 Toronto Maple Leafs season was the 96th season for the National Hockey League (NHL) franchise that was established on November 22, 1917. The regular season was reduced from its usual 82 games to 48 due to a lockout.

Due to the abbreviated 48-game schedule, the Maple Leafs played only teams from their own Eastern Conference. Within their division, they played the Boston Bruins and Buffalo Sabres four times each, and the Montreal Canadiens and Ottawa Senators five times each. The Maple Leafs played all non-divisional Eastern Conference opponents three times each.

Toronto qualified for the playoffs for the first time since the 2003–04 season. The Leafs lost Game 7 in the first round against the Boston Bruins despite holding a 4–1 lead with 11 minutes to go in the third period, though Toronto had battled back from a 3–1 series deficit to be able to force the seventh game. The Leafs would not qualify for the playoffs again until the 2016–17 season.

== Standings ==
Northeast Division
Pos	Team	GP	W	L	OTL	ROW	GF	GA	GD	Pts
1	y – Montreal Canadiens	48	29	14	5	26	149	126	+23	63
2	x – Boston Bruins	48	28	14	6	24	131	109	+22	62
3	x – Toronto Maple Leafs	48	26	17	5	26	145	133	+12	57
4	x – Ottawa Senators	48	25	17	6	21	116	104	+12	56
5	Buffalo Sabres	48	21	21	6	14	125	143	−18	48

Source: National Hockey League
x – Clinched playoff spot; y – Clinched division

Eastern Conference
Pos	Div	Team	GP	W	L	OTL	ROW	GF	GA	GD	Pts
1	AT	z – Pittsburgh Penguins	48	36	12	0	33	165	119	+46	72
2	NE	y – Montreal Canadiens	48	29	14	5	26	149	126	+23	63
3	SE	y – Washington Capitals	48	27	18	3	24	149	130	+19	57
4	NE	x – Boston Bruins	48	28	14	6	24	131	109	+22	62
5	NE	x – Toronto Maple Leafs	48	26	17	5	26	145	133	+12	57
6	AT	x – New York Rangers	48	26	18	4	22	130	112	+18	56
7	NE	x – Ottawa Senators	48	25	17	6	21	116	104	+12	56
8	AT	x – New York Islanders	48	24	17	7	20	139	139	0	55
9	SE	Winnipeg Jets	48	24	21	3	22	128	144	−16	51
10	AT	Philadelphia Flyers	48	23	22	3	22	133	141	−8	49
11	AT	New Jersey Devils	48	19	19	10	17	112	129	−17	48
12	NE	Buffalo Sabres	48	21	21	6	14	115	143	−28	48
13	SE	Carolina Hurricanes	48	19	25	4	18	128	160	−32	42
14	SE	Tampa Bay Lightning	48	18	26	4	17	148	150	−2	40
15	SE	Florida Panthers	48	15	27	6	12	112	171	−59	36

Source: National Hockey League
x – Clinched playoff spot; y – Clinched division; z – Clinched conference

== Schedule and results ==
=== Regular season ===
The Maple Leafs concluded the regular season with the best penalty-kill percentage (88%) Tied with the Ottawa Senators.

2012–13 Game Log: 26–17–5, 57 Points (home: 13–9–2; road: 13–8–3)
January: 4–3–0, 8 Points (home: 1–2–0; road: 3–1–0)

#	Jan	Opponent	Score	Location	Record	Points	Decision
1	19	@ Montreal Canadiens	2–1	Bell Centre (21,273)	1–0–0	2	Scrivens (1–0–0)
2	21	Buffalo Sabres	1–2	Air Canada Centre (19,475)	1–1–0	2	Scrivens (1–1–0)
3	23	@ Pittsburgh Penguins	5–2	Consol Energy Center (18,641)	2–1–0	4	Reimer (1–0–0)
4	24	New York Islanders	4–7	Air Canada Centre (19,125)	2–2–0	4	Scrivens (1–2–0)
5	26	@ New York Rangers	2–5	Madison Square Garden (17,200)	2–3–0	4	Reimer (1–1–0)
6	29	@ Buffalo Sabres	4–3 (OT)	First Niagara Center (18,801)	3–3–0	6	Reimer (2–1–0)
7	31	Washington Capitals	3–2	Air Canada Centre (19,374)	4–3–0	8	Reimer (3–1–0)

February: 9–6–0, 18 Points (home: 3–3–0; road: 6–3–0)

#	Feb	Opponent	Score	Location	Record	Points	Decision
8	2	Boston Bruins	0–1	Air Canada Centre (19,246)	4–4–0	8	Reimer (3–2–0)
9	4	Carolina Hurricanes	1–4	Air Canada Centre (19,072)	4–5–0	8	Reimer (3–3–0)
10	5	@ Washington Capitals	3–2	Verizon Center (18,506)	5–5–0	10	Scrivens (2–2–0)
11	7	@ Winnipeg Jets	3–2	MTS Centre (15,004)	6–5–0	12	Reimer (4–3–0)
12	9	@ Montreal Canadiens	6–0	Bell Centre (21,273)	7–5–0	14	Reimer (5–3–0)
13	11	Philadelphia Flyers	5–2	Air Canada Centre (19,253)	8–5–0	16	Reimer (6–3–0)
14	14	@ Carolina Hurricanes	1–3	PNC Arena (18,680)	8–6–0	16	Scrivens (2–3–0)
15	16	Ottawa Senators	3–0	Air Canada Centre (19,537)	9–6–0	18	Scrivens (3–3–0)
16	18	@ Florida Panthers	3–0	BB&T Center (17,177)	10–6–0	20	Scrivens (4–3–0)
17	19	@ Tampa Bay Lightning	2–4	Tampa Bay Times Forum (19,204)	10–7–0	20	Scrivens (4–4–0)
18	21	Buffalo Sabres	3–1	Air Canada Centre (19,473)	11–7–0	22	Scrivens (5–4–0)
19	23	@ Ottawa Senators	2–3	Scotiabank Place (19,499)	11–8–0	22	Scrivens (5–5–0)
20	25	@ Philadelphia Flyers	4–2	Wells Fargo Center (19,645)	12–8–0	24	Scrivens (6–5–0)
21	27	Montreal Canadiens	2–5	Air Canada Centre (19,625)	12–9–0	24	Scrivens (6–6–0)
22	28	@ New York Islanders	5–4 (OT)	Nassau Veterans Memorial Coliseum (9,222)	13–9–0	26	Reimer (7–3–0)

March: 7–3–4, 18 Points (home: 6–1–2; road: 1–2–2)

#	Mar	Opponent	Score	Location	Record	Points	Decision
23	4	New Jersey Devils	4–2	Air Canada Centre (19,435)	14–9–0	28	Reimer (8–3–0)
24	6	Ottawa Senators	5–4	Air Canada Centre (19,412)	15–9–0	30	Reimer (9–3–0)
25	7	@ Boston Bruins	2–4	TD Garden (17,565)	15–10–0	30	Scrivens (6–7–0)
26	9	Pittsburgh Penguins	4–5 (SO)	Air Canada Centre (19,418)	15–10–1	31	Reimer (9–3–1)
27	12	@ Winnipeg Jets	2–5	MTS Centre (15,004)	15–11–1	31	Reimer (9–4–1)
28	14	Pittsburgh Penguins	1–3	Air Canada Centre (19,561)	15–12–1	31	Scrivens (6–8–0)
29	16	Winnipeg Jets	4–5 (SO)	Air Canada Centre (19,401)	15–12–2	32	Reimer (9–4–2)
30	20	Tampa Bay Lightning	4–2	Air Canada Centre (19,433)	16–12–2	34	Reimer (10–4–2)
31	21	@ Buffalo Sabres	4–5 (SO)	First Niagara Center (19,070)	16–12–3	35	Reimer (10–4–3)
32	23	Boston Bruins	3–2	Air Canada Centre (19,236)	17–12–3	37	Reimer (11–4–3)
33	25	@ Boston Bruins	2–3 (SO)	TD Garden (17,565)	17–12–4	38	Reimer (11–4–4)
34	26	Florida Panthers	3–2	Air Canada Centre (19,379)	18–12–4	40	Scrivens (7–8–0)
35	28	Carolina Hurricanes	6–3	Air Canada Centre (19,236)	19–12–4	42	Reimer (12–4–4)
36	30	@ Ottawa Senators	4–0	Scotiabank Place (20,183)	20–12–4	44	Reimer (13–4–4)

April: 6–5–1, 13 Points (home: 3–3–0; road: 3–2–1)

#	Apr	Opponent	Score	Location	Record	Points	Decision
37	4	Philadelphia Flyers	3–5	Air Canada Centre (19,619)	20–13–4	44	Reimer (13–5–4)
38	6	@ New Jersey Devils	2–1	Prudential Center (17,625)	21–13–4	46	Reimer (14–5–4)
39	8	New York Rangers	4–3	Air Canada Centre (19,437)	22–13–4	48	Reimer (15–5–4)
40	10	@ New York Rangers	2–3 (SO)	Madison Square Garden (17,200)	22–13–5	49	Reimer (15–5–5)
41	13	Montreal Canadiens	5–1	Air Canada Centre (19,651)	23–13–5	51	Reimer (16–5–5)
42	15	New Jersey Devils	2–0	Air Canada Centre (19,425)	24–13–5	53	Reimer (17–5–5)
43	16	@ Washington Capitals	1–5	Verizon Center (18,506)	24–14–5	53	Scrivens (7–9–0)
44	18	New York Islanders	3–5	Air Canada Centre (19,676)	24–15–5	53	Reimer (17–6–5)
45	20	@ Ottawa Senators	4–1	Scotiabank Place (20,500)	25–15–5	55	Reimer (18–6–5)
46	24	@ Tampa Bay Lightning	2–5	Tampa Bay Times Forum (18,826)	25–16–5	55	Reimer (18–7–5)
47	25	@ Florida Panthers	4–0	BB&T Center (16,484)	26–16–5	57	Reimer (19–7–5)
48	27	Montreal Canadiens	1–4	Air Canada Centre (19,730)	26–17–5	57	Reimer (19–8–5)

Legend: = Win = Loss = OT/SO Loss

== Playoffs ==
The Maple Leafs qualified for the Stanley Cup playoffs for the first time since the 2003–04 NHL season in a game against the Ottawa Senators on April 20, 2013. They lost to the Boston Bruins in 7 games in the first round.

2013 Stanley Cup playoffs
Eastern Conference Quarterfinals – Boston won series 4–3

#	Date	Opponent	Score	Location	Series	Decision
1	May 1	@ Boston Bruins	1–4	TD Garden (17,565)	0–1	Reimer (0–1)
2	May 4	@ Boston Bruins	4–2	TD Garden (17,565)	1–1	Reimer (1–1)
3	May 6	Boston Bruins	2–5	Air Canada Centre (19,746)	1–2	Reimer (1–2)
4	May 8	Boston Bruins	3–4 (OT)	Air Canada Centre (19,708)	1–3	Reimer (1–3)
5	May 10	@ Boston Bruins	2–1	TD Garden (17,565)	2–3	Reimer (2–3)
6	May 12	Boston Bruins	2–1	Air Canada Centre (19,591)	3–3	Reimer (3–3)
7	May 13	@ Boston Bruins	4–5 (OT)	TD Garden (17,565)	3–4	Reimer (3–4)

Legend: = Win = Loss

== Player statistics ==
Final stats

=== Skaters ===
Regular season
Player	GP	G	A	Pts	+/-	PIM
Phil Kessel	48	20	32	52	−3	18
Nazem Kadri	48	18	26	44	15	23
James van Riemsdyk	48	18	14	32	−7	26
Cody Franson	45	4	25	29	4	8
Dion Phaneuf	48	9	19	28	−4	65
Tyler Bozak	46	12	16	28	−1	6
Nikolai Kulemin	48	7	16	23	−5	22
Clarke MacArthur	40	8	12	20	3	26
Joffrey Lupul	16	11	7	18	8	12
Jay McClement	48	8	9	17	0	11
Mikhail Grabovski	48	9	7	16	−10	24
Carl Gunnarsson	37	1	14	15	5	14
Matt Frattin	25	7	6	13	6	4
John-Michael Liles	32	2	9	11	−1	4
Leo Komarov	42	4	5	9	−1	18
Mark Fraser	45	0	8	8	18	85
Mike Kostka	35	0	8	8	−7	27
Frazer McLaren	35	3	2	5	0	102
Colton Orr	44	1	3	4	4	155
Jake Gardiner	12	0	4	4	0	0
Korbinian Holzer	22	2	1	3	−12	28
Ryan O'Byrne^{†}	8	1	1	2	4	6
Ryan Hamilton	10	0	2	2	1	0
Mike Komisarek	4	0	0	0	2	2
Joe Colborne	5	0	0	0	−1	2

Playoffs
Player	GP	G	A	Pts	+/-	PIM
James van Riemsdyk	7	2	5	7	−1	4
Cody Franson	7	3	3	6	0	0
Phil Kessel	7	4	2	6	3	2
Jake Gardiner	6	1	4	5	−3	0
Joffrey Lupul	7	3	1	4	−1	4
Nazem Kadri	7	1	3	4	5	10
Dion Phaneuf	7	1	2	3	−6	6
Clarke MacArthur	5	2	1	3	−1	2
Mikhail Grabovski	7	0	2	2	−10	2
Matt Frattin	6	0	2	2	−1	0
Tyler Bozak	5	1	1	2	0	4
Mark Fraser	4	0	1	1	1	7
Ryan Hamilton	2	0	1	1	0	0
Nikolai Kulemin	7	0	1	1	−9	0
Carl Gunnarsson	7	0	1	1	−7	0
John-Michael Liles	4	0	0	0	4	2
Colton Orr	7	0	0	0	−1	18
Jay McClement	7	0	0	0	−4	0
Ryan O'Byrne	6	0	0	0	2	4
Leo Komarov	7	0	0	0	0	17
Frazer McLaren	1	0	0	0	0	2
Mike Kostka	1	0	0	0	−3	0
Joe Colborne	2	0	0	0	0	0

=== Goaltenders ===
Regular season
Player	GP	GS	TOI	W	L	OT	GA	GAA	SA	SV%	SO	G	A	PIM
James Reimer	33	31	1856:09	19	8	5	76	2.46	995	.924	4	0	1	0
Ben Scrivens	20	17	1024:51	7	9	0	46	2.69	542	.915	2	0	0	6
Jussi Rynnas	1	0	10:20	0	0	0	0	0.00	6	1.000	0	0	0	0

=== Goaltenders ===
Playoffs
Player	GP	GS	TOI	W	L	GA	GAA	SA	SV%	SO	G	A	PIM
James Reimer	7	7	438:26	3	4	21	2.88	272	.923	0	0	0	0

^{†}Denotes player spent time with another team before joining the Maple Leafs. Stats reflect time with the Maple Leafs only.
^{‡}Traded mid-season
Bold/italics denotes franchise record

== Transactions ==
The Maple Leafs have been involved in the following transactions during the 2012–13 season.

=== Trades ===
Date	Details
June 23, 2012	To Winnipeg Jets Jonas Gustavsson (Note: Trade of negotiating rights to.)	To Toronto Maple Leafs Conditional 7th-round pick in 2013 (Note: Condition not satisfied.)
June 23, 2012	To Philadelphia Flyers Luke Schenn	To Toronto Maple Leafs James van Riemsdyk
January 16, 2013	To Phoenix Coyotes Matthew Lombardi	To Toronto Maple Leafs Conditional 4th-round pick in 2014 (Note: Condition satisfied.)
March 4, 2013	To Edmonton Oilers Mike Brown	To Toronto Maple Leafs Conditional 4th-round pick in 2014 (Note: Condition satisfied.)
March 14, 2013	To Washington Capitals Nicolas Deschamps	To Toronto Maple Leafs Kevin Marshall
March 15, 2013	To Anaheim Ducks Dave Steckel	To Toronto Maple Leafs Ryan Lasch; 7th-round pick in 2014
April 3, 2013	To Colorado Avalanche 4th-round pick in 2014	To Toronto Maple Leafs Ryan O'Byrne
June 23, 2013	To Los Angeles Kings Matt Frattin; Ben Scrivens; 2nd-round pick in 2014 or 2015 (Note: Toronto elected to trade its 2nd-round pick in 2015)	To Toronto Maple Leafs Jonathan Bernier

=== Free agents acquired ===
Player	Former team	Contract terms
Jay McClement	Colorado Avalanche	2 years, $3 million
Mike Kostka	Norfolk Admirals	1 year, $600,000
Keith Aucoin	Washington Capitals	1 year, $650,000
Simon Gysbers	Toronto Marlies	1 year, $600,000
Mike Mottau	Boston Bruins	1 year, $850,000
Drew MacIntyre	Toronto Marlies	1 year, $900,000

=== Free agents lost ===
Player	New team	Contract terms
Joey Crabb	Washington Capitals	1 year, $950,000
Colby Armstrong	Montreal Canadiens	1 year, $1 million
Philippe Dupuis	Pittsburgh Penguins	1 year, $600,000
Jay Rosehill	Anaheim Ducks	1 year, $550,000

=== Claimed via waivers ===
Player	Former team	Date claimed off waivers
Frazer McLaren	San Jose Sharks	January 31, 2013

=== Lost via waivers ===
Player	New team	Date claimed off waivers
Keith Aucoin	New York Islanders	January 17, 2013

=== Lost via retirement ===
Player

=== Player signings ===
Player	Date	Contract terms
Petter Granberg	May 24, 2012	3 years, $2.4 million entry-level contract
Leo Komarov	May 29, 2012	1 year, $850,000 entry-level contract
Matt Frattin	July 1, 2012	2 years, $1.7 million
Ryan Hamilton	July 1, 2012	1 year, $600,000
Jussi Rynnas	July 1, 2012	1 year, $600,000
Korbinian Holzer	July 10, 2012	1 year, $575,000
Nikolai Kulemin	July 20, 2012	2 years, $5.6 million
Mark Fraser	July 30, 2012	1 year, $600,000
Morgan Rielly	August 3, 2012	3 years, $2.775 million entry-level contract
Tyler Biggs	August 9, 2012	3 years, $2.775 million entry-level contract
Ben Scrivens	September 12, 2012	2 years, $1.225 million
Cody Franson	January 13, 2013	1 year, $1.2 million
Joffrey Lupul	January 20, 2013	5 years, $26.25 million contract extension
Josh Leivo	March 4, 2013	3 years, $2.3775 million entry-level contract
Korbinian Holzer	March 5, 2013	2 years, $1.575 million contract extension
Tom Nilsson	March 19, 2013	3 years, $2.475 million entry-level contract
Garret Sparks	March 19, 2013	3 years, $2.01 million entry-level contract
Andrew MacWilliam	April 3, 2013	2 years, $1.75 million entry-level contract
Drew MacIntyre	June 13, 2013	1 year, $600,000
Colton Orr	June 13, 2013	2 years, $1.85 million

== Draft picks ==
Toronto Maple Leafs' picks at the 2012 NHL entry draft, held in Pittsburgh, Pennsylvania on June 22 & 23, 2012.

Round	#	Player	Pos	Nationality	College/Junior/Club team (League)
1	5	Morgan Rielly	D	Canada	Moose Jaw Warriors (WHL)
2	35	Matthew Finn	D	Canada	Guelph Storm (OHL)
5	126	Dominic Toninato	C	United States	Duluth High School (USHS-MN)
6	156	Connor Brown	RW	Canada	Erie Otters (OHL)
6	157^{[a]}	Ryan Rupert	C	Canada	London Knights (OHL)
7	209^{[b]}	Viktor Loov	D	Sweden	Sodertalje SK (Allsvenskan)

=== Draft notes ===
- The Toronto Maple Leafs' third-round pick went to the Los Angeles Kings as the result of a June 26, 2010, trade that sent a 2010 third-round pick to the Maple Leafs in exchange for this pick.
- The Toronto Maple Leafs' fourth-round pick went to the New Jersey Devils as the result of an October 4, 2011, trade that sent Dave Steckel to the Maple Leafs in exchange for this pick.
- ^{a} The Anaheim Ducks' sixth-round pick went to the Toronto Maple Leafs as a result of a June 25, 2011, trade that sent a 2011 sixth-round pick to the Ducks in exchange for this pick.
- The Toronto Maple Leafs' seventh-round pick went to the Calgary Flames as the result of a July 27, 2009, trade that sent Wayne Primeau and a 2011 second-round pick to the Maple Leafs in exchange for Colin Stuart, Anton Strålman and this pick.
- ^{b} The New York Rangers' seventh-round pick went to the Toronto Maple Leafs as a result of a February 28, 2011, trade that sent John Mitchell to the Rangers in exchange for this pick.

== See also ==
- 2012–13 NHL season
