= 2012–13 Carolina Hurricanes season =

National Hockey League team season

2012–13 Carolina Hurricanes
- Division: 3rd Southeast
- Conference: 13th Eastern
- 2012–13 record: 19–25–4
- Home record: 9–14–3
- Road record: 10–11–3
- Goals for: 128
- Goals against: 160

Team information
- General manager: Jim Rutherford
- Coach: Kirk Muller
- Captain: Eric Staal
- Alternate captains: Tim Gleason; Jordan Staal
- Arena: PNC Arena
- Average attendance: 17,558 (94.0%) (24 games)

Team leaders
- Goals: Jiri Tlusty (23)
- Assists: Eric Staal (35)
- Points: Eric Staal (53)
- Penalty minutes: Eric Staal (54)
- Plus/minus: Jiri Tlusty (+15)
- Wins: Cam Ward (9)
- Goals against average: Dan Ellis (2.84)

The 2012–13 Carolina Hurricanes season was the 41st season for the franchise. Its 34th season in the National Hockey League (NHL) since June 22, 1979, and 15th season since the franchise relocated to North Carolina to start the 1997–98 NHL season. The regular season was reduced from its usual 82 games to 48 due to a lockout.

The Hurricanes did not qualify for the 2013 Stanley Cup playoffs.

== Regular season ==
=== Season standings ===
Southeast Division
Pos	Team	GP	W	L	OTL	ROW	GF	GA	GD	Pts
1	y – Washington Capitals	48	27	18	3	24	149	126	+23	57
2	Winnipeg Jets	48	24	21	3	22	128	109	+19	51
3	Carolina Hurricanes	48	19	25	4	18	128	133	−5	42
4	Tampa Bay Lightning	48	18	26	4	17	148	104	+44	40
5	Florida Panthers	48	15	27	6	12	112	143	−31	36

Source: National Hockey League
y – Clinched division

Eastern Conference
Pos	Div	Team	GP	W	L	OTL	ROW	GF	GA	GD	Pts
1	AT	z – Pittsburgh Penguins	48	36	12	0	33	165	119	+46	72
2	NE	y – Montreal Canadiens	48	29	14	5	26	149	126	+23	63
3	SE	y – Washington Capitals	48	27	18	3	24	149	130	+19	57
4	NE	x – Boston Bruins	48	28	14	6	24	131	109	+22	62
5	NE	x – Toronto Maple Leafs	48	26	17	5	26	145	133	+12	57
6	AT	x – New York Rangers	48	26	18	4	22	130	112	+18	56
7	NE	x – Ottawa Senators	48	25	17	6	21	116	104	+12	56
8	AT	x – New York Islanders	48	24	17	7	20	139	139	0	55
9	SE	Winnipeg Jets	48	24	21	3	22	128	144	−16	51
10	AT	Philadelphia Flyers	48	23	22	3	22	133	141	−8	49
11	AT	New Jersey Devils	48	19	19	10	17	112	129	−17	48
12	NE	Buffalo Sabres	48	21	21	6	14	115	143	−28	48
13	SE	Carolina Hurricanes	48	19	25	4	18	128	160	−32	42
14	SE	Tampa Bay Lightning	48	18	26	4	17	148	150	−2	40
15	SE	Florida Panthers	48	15	27	6	12	112	171	−59	36

Source: National Hockey League
x – Clinched playoff spot; y – Clinched division; z – Clinched conference

== Schedule and results ==
2012–13 Game Log
January: 2–3–0 (Home: 1–2–0; Road: 1–1–0)

#	Jan	Visitor	Score	Home	Decision	Location/Attendance	Record	Points
1	19	Carolina Hurricanes	1–5	Florida Panthers	Ward	BB&T Center (19,688)	0–1–0	0
2	22	Tampa Bay Lightning	4–1	Carolina Hurricanes	Ward	PNC Arena (18,680)	0–2–0	0
3	24	Buffalo Sabres	3–6	Carolina Hurricanes	Ward	PNC Arena (18,081)	1–1–0	2
4	25	Carolina Hurricanes	3–1	Buffalo Sabres	Ellis	First Niagara Center (18,824)	2–2–0	4
5	28	Boston Bruins	5–3	Carolina Hurricanes	Ward	PNC Arena (17,190)	2–3–0	4

February: 8–5–1 (Home: 3–2–0; Road: 5–3–1)

#	Feb	Visitor	Score	Home	Decision	Location/Attendance	Record	Points
6	1	Ottawa Senators	0–1	Carolina Hurricanes	Ellis	PNC Arena (18,680)	3–3–0	6
7	2	Carolina Hurricanes	3–5	Philadelphia Flyers	Ellis	Wells Fargo Center (19,691)	3–4–0	6
8	4	Carolina Hurricanes	4–1	Toronto Maple Leafs	Ward	Air Canada Centre (19,072)	4–4–0	8
9	7	Carolina Hurricanes	3–2 SO	Ottawa Senators	Ward	Scotiabank Place (17,337)	5–4–0	10
10	9	Carolina Hurricanes	3–4 OT	Philadelphia Flyers	Ward	Wells Fargo Center (19,691)	5–4–1	11
11	11	Carolina Hurricanes	6–4	New York Islanders	Ward	Nassau Coliseum (9,622)	6–4–1	13
12	12	Carolina Hurricanes	4–2	New Jersey Devils	Ward	Prudential Center (17,625)	7–4–1	15
13	14	Toronto Maple Leafs	1–3	Carolina Hurricanes	Ellis	PNC Arena (18,680)	8–4–1	17
14	18	Carolina Hurricanes	0–3	Montreal Canadiens	Ward	Bell Center (21,273)	8–5–1	17
15	21	Winnipeg Jets	4–3	Carolina Hurricanes	Ward	PNC Arena (18,282)	8–6–1	17
16	23^{[A]}	Tampa Bay Lightning	5–2	Carolina Hurricanes	Ellis	PNC Arena (18,680)	8–7–1	17
17	24	Carolina Hurricanes	4–2	New York Islanders	Ward	Nassau Coliseum (10,048)	9–7–1	19
18	26	Carolina Hurricanes	0–3	Washington Capitals	Ward	Verizon Center (18,506)	9–8–1	19
19	28	Pittsburgh Penguins	1–4	Carolina Hurricanes	Ward	PNC Arena (18,680)	10–8–1	21

March: 6–7–1 (Home: 3–5–0; Road: 3–2–1)

#	Mar	Visitor	Score	Home	Decision	Location/Attendance	Record	Points
20	2^{[A]}	Florida Panthers	2–6	Carolina Hurricanes	Ward	PNC Arena (18,680)	11–8–1	23
21	3	Carolina Hurricanes	3–2	Florida Panthers	Ward	BB&T Center (15,978)	12–8–1	25
22	5	Buffalo Sabres	3–4	Carolina Hurricanes	Peters	PNC Arena (15,277)	13–8–1	27
23	7^{[A]}	Montreal Canadiens	4–2	Carolina Hurricanes	Peters	PNC Arena (16,774)	13–9–1	27
24	9	New Jersey Devils	3–6	Carolina Hurricanes	Ellis	PNC Arena (18,680)	14–9–1	29
25	12	Carolina Hurricanes	4–0	Washington Capitals	Peters	Verizon Center (18,506)	15–9–1	31
26	14^{[A]}	Washington Capitals	3–2	Carolina Hurricanes	Ellis	PNC Arena (16,810)	15–10–1	31
27	16	Carolina Hurricanes	1–4	Tampa Bay Lightning	Peters	Times Forum (19,204)	15–11–1	31
28	18	Carolina Hurricanes	1–2 SO	New York Rangers	Ellis	Madison Square Garden (17,200)	15–11–2	32
29	19	Florida Panthers	4–1	Carolina Hurricanes	Ellis	PNC Arena (16,349)	15–12–2	32
30	21	New Jersey Devils	4–1	Carolina Hurricanes	Ellis	PNC Arena (16,941)	15–13–2	32
31	26^{[A]}	Winnipeg Jets	4–1	Carolina Hurricanes	Peters	PNC Arena (16,225)	15–14–2	32
32	28	Carolina Hurricanes	3–6	Toronto Maple Leafs	Peters	Air Canada Centre (19,236)	15–15–2	32
33	30	Carolina Hurricanes	3–1	Winnipeg Jets	Peters	MTS Centre (15,004)	16–15–2	34

April: 3–10–2 (Home: 2–5–1; Road: 1–5–1)

#	Apr	Visitor	Score	Home	Decision	Location/Attendance	Record	Points
34	1	Carolina Hurricanes	1–4	Montreal Canadiens	Peters	Bell Center (21,273)	16–16–2	34
35	2	Washington Capitals	5–3	Carolina Hurricanes	Peters	PNC Arena (16,530)	16–17–2	34
36	4	Tampa Bay Lightning	5–0	Carolina Hurricanes	Ellis	PNC Arena (17,042)	16–18–2	34
37	6^{[A]}	New York Rangers	4–1	Carolina Hurricanes	Ellis	PNC Arena (17,457)	16–19–2	34
38	8	Carolina Hurricanes	2–6	Boston Bruins	Ellis	TD Garden (17,565)	16–20–2	34
39	9	Pittsburgh Penguins	5–3	Carolina Hurricanes	Peters	PNC Arena (17,168)	16–21–2	34
40	11	Carolina Hurricanes	1–3	Washington Capitals	Peters	Verizon Center (18,506)	16–22–2	34
41	13	Boston Bruins	2–4	Carolina Hurricanes	Peters	PNC Arena (18,680)	17–22–2	36
42	16	Carolina Hurricanes	2–3	Ottawa Senators	Peters	Scotiabank Place (19,181)	17–23–2	36
43	18	Carolina Hurricanes	3–4 OT	Winnipeg Jets	Peters	MTS Centre (15,004)	17–23–3	37
44	20	Philadelphia Flyers	5–3	Carolina Hurricanes	Peters	PNC Arena (18,112)	17–24–3	37
45	21^{[A]}	Carolina Hurricanes	3–2	Tampa Bay Lightning	Ellis	Times Forum (19,204)	18–24–3	39
46	23	New York Islanders	3–4 SO	Carolina Hurricanes	Ellis	PNC Arena (16,601)	19–24–3	41
47	25	New York Rangers	4–3 OT	Carolina Hurricanes	Ellis	PNC Arena (17,172)	19–24–4	42
48	27	Carolina Hurricanes	3–8	Pittsburgh Penguins	Peters	Consol Energy Center (18,658)	19–25–4	42

Legend: = Win = Loss = OT/SO Loss
^{A} Alternate Jersey

== Player statistics ==
Final stats

Skaters

Regular season
Player	GP	G	A	Pts	+/-	PIM
Eric Staal	48	18	35	53	5	54
Alexander Semin	44	13	31	44	14	46
Jiri Tlusty	48	23	15	38	15	18
Jordan Staal	48	10	21	31	−18	32
Jeff Skinner	42	13	11	24	−21	26
Joe Corvo	40	6	11	17	−3	14
Patrick Dwyer	46	8	8	16	−7	12
Justin Faulk	38	5	10	15	1	15
Jussi Jokinen^{‡}	33	6	5	11	−8	18
Jay Harrison	47	3	7	10	−10	51
Tuomo Ruutu	17	4	5	9	−6	8
Tim Gleason	42	0	9	9	−3	40
Joni Pitkanen	22	1	8	9	2	12
Riley Nash	32	4	5	9	−4	8
Jamie McBain	40	1	7	8	0	12
Bobby Sanguinetti	37	2	4	6	−6	4
Drayson Bowman	37	3	2	5	−7	17
Marc-Andre Bergeron^{†}	13	0	4	4	−7	5
Chad LaRose	35	2	2	4	−8	29
Kevin Westgarth	31	2	2	4	1	45
Tim Brent	30	0	3	3	−3	8
Zac Dalpe	10	1	2	3	−7	0
Tim Wallace	28	1	1	2	−9	17
Brett Bellemore	8	0	2	2	−2	7
Andreas Nodl	8	0	1	1	−1	2
Chris Terry	3	1	0	1	0	0
Jeremy Welsh	5	0	1	1	1	0
Marc-Andre Gragnani	1	0	0	0	0	0
Brett Sutter	3	0	0	0	−1	4
Nicolas Blanchard	9	0	0	0	−2	20
Jared Staal	2	0	0	0	−2	2
Michal Jordan	5	0	0	0	−2	2
Ryan Murphy	4	0	0	0	−4	2
Zach Boychuk^{‡}	1	0	0	0	0	0
Adam Hall^{†‡}	6	0	0	0	−2	0
Totals		127	214	341	−104	530

Goaltenders

Regular season
Player	GP	GS	TOI	W	L	OT	GA	GAA	SA	SV%	SO	G	A	PIM
Dan Ellis	19	16	997:04	6	8	2	52	3.13	555	.906	1	0	2	0
Justin Peters	19	16	954:24	4	11	1	55	3.46	506	.891	1	0	0	0
Cam Ward	17	16	929:27	9	6	1	44	2.84	477	.908	0	0	0	0
Totals		48	2880:55	19	25	4	151	3.15	1538	.902	2	0	2	0

^{†}Denotes player spent time with another team before joining the Hurricanes. Stats reflect time with the Hurricanes only.
^{‡}Traded mid-season
Bold/italics denotes franchise record

== Transactions ==
The Hurricanes have been involved in the following transactions during the 2012–13 season.

=== Trades ===
Date	Details
June 22, 2012	To Pittsburgh Penguins Brandon Sutter; Brian Dumoulin; 1st-round pick in 2012	To Carolina Hurricanes Jordan Staal
January 13, 2013	To Philadelphia Flyers Brian Boucher; Mark Alt	To Carolina Hurricanes Luke Pither
January 13, 2013	To Los Angeles Kings Anthony Stewart; 4th-round pick in 2013; 6th-round pick in 2014	To Carolina Hurricanes Kevin Westgarth
April 2, 2013	To Tampa Bay Lightning Adam Hall; 7th-round pick in 2013	To Carolina Hurricanes Marc-Andre Bergeron
April 3, 2013	To Pittsburgh Penguins Jussi Jokinen	To Carolina Hurricanes Conditional 6th-round pick in 2013 (Note: Condition not satisfied.)

=== Free agents acquired ===
Player	Former team	Contract terms
Joe Corvo	Boston Bruins	1 year, $2 million
Marc-Andre Gragnani	Vancouver Canucks	1 year, $800,000
Tim Wallace	Tampa Bay Lightning	1 year, $700,000
Alexander Semin	Washington Capitals	1 year, $7 million
Dan Ellis	Anaheim Ducks	1 year, $650,000

=== Free agents lost ===
Player	New team	Contract terms
Bryan Allen	Anaheim Ducks	3 years, $10.5 million
Derek Joslin	Vancouver Canucks	1 year, $700,000

=== Claimed via waivers ===
Player	Former team	Date claimed off waivers
Adam Hall	Tampa Bay Lightning	March 16, 2013
Zach Boychuk	Nashville Predators	March 21, 2013

=== Lost via waivers ===
Player	New team	Date claimed off waivers
Zach Boychuk	Pittsburgh Penguins	January 31, 2013

=== Lost via retirement ===
Player

=== Player signings ===
Player	Date	Contract terms
Brian Dumoulin	April 10, 2012	3 years, $2.225 million entry-level contract
Jiri Tlusty	April 24, 2012	2 years, $3.2 million
Jamie McBain	May 21, 2012	2 years, $3.6 million
Nicolas Blanchard	May 21, 2012	2 years, $1.05 million
Bobby Sanguinetti	May 21, 2012	1 year, $700,000
Justin Krueger	June 1, 2012	1 year, $600,000
Brody Sutter	June 1, 2012	3 years, $1.575 million entry-level contract
Jordan Staal	July 1, 2012	10 years, $60 million contract extension
Justin Peters	July 1, 2012	2 years, $1.075 million
Brett Sutter	July 1, 2012	1 year, $550,000
Chris Terry	July 13, 2012	2 years, $1.05 million
Jerome Samson	July 20, 2012	1 year, $600,000
Drayson Bowman	July 23, 2012	2 years, $1.2 million
Zach Boychuk	July 24, 2012	1 year, $625,000
Jay Harrison	July 24, 2012	3 years, $4.5 million contract extension
Jeff Skinner	August 8, 2012	6 years, $34.35 million contract extension
Patrick Dwyer	September 5, 2012	2 years, $1.8 million contract extension
Jeremy Welsh	September 11, 2012	2 years, $1.7 million
Danny Biega	March 13, 2013	3 years, $2.025 million entry-level contract
Keegan Lowe	March 14, 2013	3 years, $1.98 million entry-level contract
Alexander Semin	March 25, 2013	5 years, $35 million contract extension
Brock McGinn	April 3, 2013	3 years, $2.25 million entry-level contract
Brendan Woods	April 10, 2013	3 years, $1.95 million entry-level contract
Brett Sutter	June 25, 2013	1 year, $600,000
Brett Bellemore	June 28, 2013	1 year, $600,000

== Draft picks ==
Carolina Hurricanes' picks at the 2012 NHL entry draft, held in Pittsburgh, Pennsylvania on June 22 & 23, 2012.

Round	#	Player	Pos	Nationality	College/Junior/Club team (League)
2	38	Phil Di Giuseppe	LW	Canada	University of Michigan (CCHA)
2	47^{[a]}	Brock McGinn	LW	Canada	Guelph Storm (OHL)
3	69	Daniel Altshuller	G	Canada	Oshawa Generals (OHL)
4	99	Erik Karlsson	C/LW	Sweden	Frolunda HC Jr. (J20 SuperElit)
4	115^{[b]}	Trevor Carrick	D	Canada	Mississauga Steelheads (OHL)
4	120^{[c]}	Jaccob Slavin	D	United States	Chicago Steel (USHL)
5	129	Brendan Woods	LW	Canada	University of Wisconsin (WCHA)
6	159	Colin Olsen	G	United States	U.S. National Team Development Program (USHL)
7	189	Brendan Collier	LW	United States	Malden Catholic High School (USHS-MA)

Draft Notes

- The Carolina Hurricanes' first-round pick went to the Pittsburgh Penguins as the result of a June 22, 2012, trade that sent Jordan Staal to the Hurricanes in exchange for Brandon Sutter, Brian Dumoulin and this pick.
- ^{a} The San Jose Sharks' second-round pick went to the Carolina Hurricanes as a result of a February 18, 2011, trade that sent Ian White to the Sharks in exchange for this pick.
- ^{b} The Boston Bruins' fourth-round pick went to the Carolina Hurricanes as a result of a July 5, 2011, trade that sent Joe Corvo to the Bruins in exchange for this pick.
- ^{c} The New Jersey Devils' fourth-round pick went to the Carolina Hurricanes as a result of a January 20, 2012, trade that sent Alexei Ponikarovsky to the Devils in exchange for Joe Sova and this pick.
