= 2012–13 New York Islanders season =

NHL hockey team season

2012–13 New York Islanders
- Division: 3rd Atlantic
- Conference: 8th Eastern
- 2012–13 record: 24–17–7
- Home record: 10–11–3
- Road record: 14–6–4
- Goals for: 139
- Goals against: 139

Team information
- General manager: Garth Snow
- Coach: Jack Capuano
- Captain: Mark Streit
- Alternate captains: Kyle Okposo; John Tavares
- Arena: Nassau Veterans Memorial Coliseum
- Average attendance: 13,306 (82.0%) (24 games)

Team leaders
- Goals: John Tavares (28)
- Assists: Matt Moulson (29)
- Points: John Tavares (47)
- Penalty minutes: Matt Martin (63)
- Plus/minus: Lubomir Visnovsky (+12)
- Wins: Evgeni Nabokov (23)
- Goals against average: Evgeni Nabokov (2.50)

The 2012–13 New York Islanders season was the 41st season in the franchise's history. The regular season was reduced from its usual 82 games to 48 due to a lockout.

For the sixth time in franchise history, the Islanders tied their longest homestand (of seven games) – beginning on February 24 and lasting through March 9 – in which they earned three wins during that span.

The Islanders qualified for the Stanley Cup playoffs for the first time since the 2006–07 NHL season.

== Regular season ==
On March 22, 2013, the Islanders were 12th in the Eastern Conference and a playoff spot seemed unlikely. The team would then earn points in 14 of 15 games, including 11 consecutive games with at least a point to officially clinch a playoff berth on April 23.

The Islanders tied the Minnesota Wild for the fewest shorthanded goals allowed, with 0.

=== Season standings ===
Atlantic Division
Pos	Team	GP	W	L	OTL	ROW	GF	GA	GD	Pts
1	Pittsburgh Penguins	48	36	12	0	33	165	119	+46	72
2	New York Rangers	48	26	18	4	22	130	112	+18	56
3	New York Islanders	48	24	17	7	20	139	139	0	55
4	Philadelphia Flyers	48	23	22	3	22	133	141	−8	49
5	New Jersey Devils	48	19	19	10	17	112	129	−17	48

Source: National Hockey League

Eastern Conference
Pos	Div	Team	GP	W	L	OTL	ROW	GF	GA	GD	Pts
1	AT	z – Pittsburgh Penguins	48	36	12	0	33	165	119	+46	72
2	NE	y – Montreal Canadiens	48	29	14	5	26	149	126	+23	63
3	SE	y – Washington Capitals	48	27	18	3	24	149	130	+19	57
4	NE	x – Boston Bruins	48	28	14	6	24	131	109	+22	62
5	NE	x – Toronto Maple Leafs	48	26	17	5	26	145	133	+12	57
6	AT	x – New York Rangers	48	26	18	4	22	130	112	+18	56
7	NE	x – Ottawa Senators	48	25	17	6	21	116	104	+12	56
8	AT	x – New York Islanders	48	24	17	7	20	139	139	0	55
9	SE	Winnipeg Jets	48	24	21	3	22	128	144	−16	51
10	AT	Philadelphia Flyers	48	23	22	3	22	133	141	−8	49
11	AT	New Jersey Devils	48	19	19	10	17	112	129	−17	48
12	NE	Buffalo Sabres	48	21	21	6	14	115	143	−28	48
13	SE	Carolina Hurricanes	48	19	25	4	18	128	160	−32	42
14	SE	Tampa Bay Lightning	48	18	26	4	17	148	150	−2	40
15	SE	Florida Panthers	48	15	27	6	12	112	171	−59	36

Source: National Hockey League
x – Clinched playoff spot; y – Clinched division; z – Clinched conference

== Schedule and results ==
2012–13 Schedule
January: 4–2–1 (Home: 1–1–0; Road: 3–1–1), 9 Points

Game	Date	Visitor	Score	Home	OT	Decision	Attendance	Record	Recap
1	January 19	New Jersey	2–1	NY Islanders		Nabokov	16,170	0–1–0	
2	January 21	Tampa Bay	3–4	NY Islanders		Nabokov	15,322	1–1–0	
3	January 24	NY Islanders	7–4	Toronto		Nabokov	19,125	2–1–0	
4	January 25	NY Islanders	2–4	Boston		DiPietro	17,565	2–2–0	
5	January 27	NY Islanders	4–5	Winnipeg	OT	Nabokov	15,004	2–2–1	
6	January 29	NY Islanders	4–1	Pittsburgh		Nabokov	18,657	3–2–1	
7	January 31	NY Islanders	5–4	New Jersey	OT	Nabokov	17,625	4–2–1	

February: 4–9–1 (Home: 1–7–1; Road: 3–2–0), 9 Points

Game	Date	Visitor	Score	Home	OT	Decision	Attendance	Record	Recap
8	February 3	New Jersey	3–0	NY Islanders		Nabokov	11,558	4–3–1	
9	February 5	Pittsburgh	4–2	NY Islanders		Nabokov	11,318	4–4–1	
10	February 7	NY Islanders	1–4	NY Rangers		Nabokov	17,200	4–5–1	
11	February 9	Buffalo	3–2	NY Islanders		Nabokov	12,608	4–6–1	
12	February 11	Carolina	6–4	NY Islanders		DiPietro	9,622	4–7–1	
13	February 14	NY Islanders	4–3	NY Rangers	SO	Nabokov	17,200	5–7–1	
14	February 16	New Jersey	1–5	NY Islanders		Nabokov	15,488	6–7–1	
15	February 18	Philadelphia	7–0	NY Islanders		Nabokov	16,170	6–8–1	
16	February 19	NY Islanders	1–3	Ottawa		DiPietro	18,595	6–9–1	
17	February 21	NY Islanders	4–3	Montreal	OT	Nabokov	21,273	7–9–1	
18	February 23	NY Islanders	4–0	Buffalo		Nabokov	19,070	8–9–1	
19	February 24	Carolina	4–2	NY Islanders		Poulin	10,048	8–10–1	
20	February 26	Boston	4–1	NY Islanders		Nabokov	12,788	8–11–1	
21	February 28	Toronto	5–4	NY Islanders	OT	Nabokov	9,222	8–11–2	

March: 8–5–1 (Home: 4–3–1; Road: 4–2–0), 17 Points

Game	Date	Visitor	Score	Home	OT	Decision	Attendance	Record	Recap
22	March 3	Ottawa	2–3	NY Islanders	SO	Nabokov	13,512	9–11–2	
23	March 5	Montreal	3–6	NY Islanders		Nabokov	9,498	10–11–2	
24	March 7	NY Rangers	2–1	NY Islanders	OT	Nabokov	16,170	10–11–3	
25	March 9	Washington	2–5	NY Islanders		Nabokov	14,819	11–11–3	
26	March 10	NY Islanders	1–6	Pittsburgh		Nabokov	18,634	11–12–3	
27	March 14	NY Islanders	2–0	Tampa Bay		Nabokov	19,204	12–12–3	
28	March 16	NY Islanders	4–3	Florida		Nabokov	17,627	13–12–3	
29	March 19	Ottawa	5–3	NY Islanders		Nabokov	10,668	13–13–3	
30	March 21	Montreal	5–2	NY Islanders		Poulin	11,012	13–14–3	
31	March 22	Pittsburgh	4–2	NY Islanders		Nabokov	14,888	13–15–3	
32	March 24	Florida	0-3	NY Islanders		Nabokov	14,512	14–15–3	
33	March 26	NY Islanders	3–2	Washington		Nabokov	18,506	15–15–3	
34	March 28	NY Islanders	4–3	Philadelphia	SO	Nabokov	19,906	16–15–3	
35	March 30	NY Islanders	0–2	Pittsburgh		Nabokov	18,673	16–16–3	

April: 8–1–4 (Home: 4–0–1; Road: 4–1–3), 20 Points

Game	Date	Visitor	Score	Home	OT	Decision	Attendance	Record	Recap
36	April 1	NY Islanders	3–1	New Jersey		Nabokov	17,625	17–16–3	
37	April 2	Winnipeg	2–5	NY Islanders		Poulin	11,819	18–16–3	
38	April 4	NY Islanders	1–2	Washington	SO	Nabokov	18,506	18–16–4	
39	April 6	Tampa Bay	2–4	NY Islanders		Nabokov	16,170	19–16–4	
40	April 9	Philadelphia	1–4	NY Islanders		Nabokov	13,888	20–16–4	
41	April 11	NY Islanders	2–1	Boston		Nabokov	17,565	21–16–4	
42	April 13	NY Rangers	1–0	NY Islanders	OT	Nabokov	16,170	21–16–5	
43	April 16	Florida	2–5	NY Islanders		Nabokov	15,922	22–16–5	
44	April 18	NY Islanders	5–3	Toronto		Nabokov	19,676	23–16–5	
45	April 20	NY Islanders	5–4	Winnipeg	SO	Nabokov	15,004	24–16–5	
46	April 23	NY Islanders	3–4	Carolina	SO	Nabokov	16,601	24–16–6	
47	April 25	NY Islanders	1–2	Philadelphia		Poulin	19,798	24–17–6	
48	April 26	NY Islanders	1–2	Buffalo	SO	Nabokov	19,070	24–17–7	

Legend:

Win (2 points) Loss (0 points) OT/SO Loss (1 point)

== Playoffs ==
The New York Islanders ended the 2012–13 regular season as the Eastern Conference's 8th seed. They were defeated 4–2 by the #1 seed Pittsburgh Penguins in the first round.

2013 Stanley Cup Playoffs
Eastern Conference Quarterfinals – Penguins won series 4–2

Game	Date	Visitor	Score	Home	OT	Decision	Attendance	Series	Recap
1	May 1	NY Islanders	0–5	Pittsburgh		Nabokov	18,612	0–1	Recap
2	May 3	NY Islanders	4–3	Pittsburgh		Nabokov	18,624	1–1	Recap
3	May 5	Pittsburgh	5–4	NY Islanders	OT	Nabokov	16,170	1–2	Recap
4	May 7	Pittsburgh	4–6	NY Islanders		Nabokov	16,170	2–2	Recap
5	May 9	NY Islanders	0–4	Pittsburgh		Nabokov	18,636	2–3	Recap
6	May 11	Pittsburgh	4–3	NY Islanders	OT	Nabokov	16,170	2–4	Recap

Legend: = Win = Loss = Playoff series win

== Player statistics ==
Final stats

Skaters

Regular season
Player	GP	G	A	Pts	+/-	PIM
John Tavares	48	28	19	47	−2	18
Matt Moulson	47	15	29	44	−3	4
Brad Boyes	48	10	25	35	−6	16
Frans Nielsen	48	6	23	29	−3	12
Mark Streit	48	6	21	27	−14	22
Kyle Okposo	48	4	20	24	−2	38
Michael Grabner	45	16	5	21	4	12
Josh Bailey	38	11	8	19	7	6
Colin McDonald	45	7	10	17	−1	32
Casey Cizikas	45	6	9	15	0	14
Lubomir Visnovsky	35	3	11	14	12	20
Keith Aucoin	41	6	6	12	−1	4
Andrew MacDonald	48	3	9	12	−2	20
Matt Martin	48	4	7	11	−2	63
Travis Hamonic	48	3	7	10	−8	28
Marty Reasoner	31	0	5	5	−3	4
David Ullstrom	20	2	3	5	−2	6
Brian Strait	19	0	4	4	4	10
Thomas Hickey	39	1	3	4	9	8
Radek Martinek	13	3	0	3	−2	4
Matt Carkner	22	0	2	2	−2	46
Jesse Joensuu	7	0	2	2	2	6
Anders Lee	2	1	1	2	−3	0
Joe Finley	16	0	1	1	−5	20
Eric Boulton	15	0	0	0	−4	36

Playoffs
Player	GP	G	A	Pts	+/-	PIM
Mark Streit	6	2	3	5	−1	4
John Tavares	6	3	2	5	−4	4
Kyle Okposo	6	3	1	4	−1	5
Michael Grabner	6	1	3	4	2	0
Casey Cizikas	6	2	2	4	1	12
Brad Boyes	6	0	3	3	−3	2
Keith Aucoin	6	0	3	3	1	10
Colin McDonald	6	2	1	3	2	2
Matt Moulson	6	2	1	3	−4	10
Josh Bailey	6	0	3	3	−1	0
Lubomir Visnovsky	6	0	2	2	2	2
Frans Nielsen	6	0	2	2	−2	0
Matt Carkner	4	0	1	1	0	2
Brian Strait	6	1	0	1	1	12
Travis Hamonic	6	0	1	1	−4	23
David Ullstrom	3	0	1	1	1	0
Matt Martin	6	1	0	1	0	14
Marty Reasoner	1	0	0	0	−1	17
Radek Martinek	2	0	0	0	−2	2
Jesse Joensuu	1	0	0	0	0	0
Andrew MacDonald	4	0	0	0	0	4
Thomas Hickey	2	0	0	0	−2	2
Brock Nelson	1	0	0	0	−1	0

Goaltenders

Regular season
Player	GP	GS	TOI	W	L	OT	GA	GAA	SA	SV%	SO	G	A	PIM
Evgeni Nabokov	41	41	2475:24	23	11	7	103	2.50	1139	.910	3	0	4	6
Kevin Poulin	5	4	257:37	1	3	0	13	3.02	122	.893	0	0	0	0
Rick DiPietro	3	3	175:36	0	3	0	12	4.09	83	.855	0	0	0	0

Playoffs
Player	GP	GS	TOI	W	L	GA	GAA	SA	SV%	SO	G	A	PIM
Evgeni Nabokov	6	6	324:04	2	4	24	4.44	152	.842	0	0	0	0
Kevin Poulin	2	0	52:26	0	0	1	1.15	15	.933	0	0	0	0

^{†}Denotes player spent time with another team before joining the Islanders. Stats reflect time with the Islanders only.
^{‡}Denotes player was traded mid-season. Stats reflect time with the Islanders only.
Bold/italics denotes franchise record

== Notable achievements ==
=== Milestones ===
Regular season
Player	Milestone	Reached
Thomas Hickey	1st career NHL game	January 27, 2013
Anders Lee	1st career NHL goal	April 2, 2013

== Transactions ==
The Islanders have been involved in the following transactions during the 2012–13 season:

=== Trades ===
Date	Details
June 22, 2012	To Anaheim Ducks 2nd-round pick in 2013	To New York Islanders Lubomir Visnovsky
February 7, 2013	To Boston Bruins Conditional 2nd-round pick in 2014 or 2015 (Note: Condition not satisfied.)	To New York Islanders Tim Thomas
June 12, 2013	To Philadelphia Flyers Mark Streit (Note: Trade of negotiating rights to.)	To New York Islanders Shane Harper; 4th-round pick in 2014

=== Free agents signed ===
Player	Former team	Contract terms
Jesse Joensuu	HV71	1 year, $600,000
Jon Landry	Bridgeport Sound Tigers	1 year, $750,000
Matt Watkins	Phoenix Coyotes	1 year, $700,000
Brad Boyes	Buffalo Sabres	1 year, $1 million
Matt Carkner	Ottawa Senators	3 years, $4.5 million
Brandon DeFazio	Wilkes-Barre/Scranton Penguins	1 year, $575,000
Colin McDonald	Pittsburgh Penguins	1 year, $700,000
Eric Boulton	New Jersey Devils	1 year, $540,000
Nathan McIver	Providence Bruins	1 year, $750,000
Radek Martinek	Columbus Blue Jackets	1 year, $750,000
Joey Diamond	University of Maine	1 year, $610,000 entry-level contract
Chris Bruton	Peoria Rivermen	1 year, $610,000 entry-level contract

=== Free agents lost ===
Player	New team	Contract terms
Micheal Haley	New York Rangers	2 years, $1.2 million
Dylan Reese	Pittsburgh Penguins	1 year, $600,000
P. A. Parenteau	Colorado Avalanche	4 years, $16 million
Al Montoya	Winnipeg Jets	1 year, $601,000
Jay Pandolfo	Boston Bruins	1 year, $600,000

=== Claimed via waivers ===
Player	Former team	Date claimed off waivers
Joe Finley	Buffalo Sabres	January 14, 2013
Thomas Hickey	Los Angeles Kings	January 15, 2013
Keith Aucoin	Toronto Maple Leafs	January 17, 2013
Brian Strait	Pittsburgh Penguins	January 18, 2013

=== Lost via waivers ===
Player	New team	Date claimed off waivers

=== Lost via retirement ===
Player
Steve Staios

=== Player signings ===
Player	Date	Contract terms
Sean Backman	July 16, 2012	1 year, $577,500
Jason Clark	July 17, 2012	3 years, $1.605 million entry-level contract
Ty Wishart	July 18, 2012	1 year, $843,413
Griffin Reinhart	August 2, 2012	3 years, $2.775 million entry-level contract
Matt Martin	September 15, 2012	4 years, $4 million
Brian Strait	January 13, 2013	3 years, $2.325 million contract extension
Brett Gallant	February 5, 2013	1 year, $610,000 entry-level contract
Colin McDonald	March 15, 2013	2 years, $1.275 million contract extension
Lubomir Visnovsky	March 29, 2013	2 years, $9.5 million contract extension
Anders Lee	April 1, 2013	2 years, $1.8 million entry-level contract
Andrey Pedan	April 3, 2013	3 years, $2.3775 million entry-level contract
Scott Mayfield	April 5, 2013	3 years, $2.775 million entry-level contract
Eric Boulton	May 17, 2013	1 year, $550,000 contract extension

== Draft picks ==
New York Islanders' picks at the 2012 NHL entry draft, held in Pittsburgh, Pennsylvania on June 22 & 23, 2012.

Round	#	Player	Pos	Nationality	College/Junior/Club team (League)
1	4	Griffin Reinhart	Defense	Canada	Edmonton Oil Kings (WHL)
2	34	Ville Pokka	Defense	Finland	Karpat (SM-liiga)
3	65	Adam Pelech	Defense	Canada	Erie Otters (OHL)
4	103^{[a]}	Loic Leduc	Defense	Canada	Cape Breton Screaming Eagles (QMJHL)
5	125	Doyle Somerby	Defense	United States	Kimball Union Academy (USHS-NH)
6	155	Jesse Graham	Defense	Canada	Niagara IceDogs (OHL)
7	185	Jake Bischoff	Defense	United States	Grand Rapids High School (USHS-MN)

Draft notes

- The New York Islanders' fourth-round pick went to the Vancouver Canucks as the result of a June 27, 2011, trade that sent Christian Ehrhoff to the Islanders in exchange for this pick.
- ^{a} The Buffalo Sabres' fourth-round pick went to the New York Islanders as a result of a June 29, 2011, trade that sent Christian Ehrhoff to the Sabres in exchange for this pick.

== See also ==
- 2012–13 NHL season
