= 2012–13 Philadelphia Flyers season =

NHL hockey team season

2012–13 Philadelphia Flyers
- Division: 4th Atlantic
- Conference: 10th Eastern
- 2012–13 record: 23–22–3
- Home record: 15–7–2
- Road record: 8–15–1
- Goals for: 133
- Goals against: 141

Team information
- General manager: Paul Holmgren
- Coach: Peter Laviolette
- Captain: Claude Giroux
- Alternate captains: Danny Briere; Scott Hartnell; Kimmo Timonen
- Arena: Wells Fargo Center
- Average attendance: 19,786 (101.3%)
- Minor league affiliates: Adirondack Phantoms; Trenton Titans

Team leaders
- Goals: Jakub Voracek (22)
- Assists: Claude Giroux (35)
- Points: Claude Giroux (48)
- Penalty minutes: Zac Rinaldo (85)
- Plus/minus: Ruslan Fedotenko (8)
- Wins: Ilya Bryzgalov (19)
- Goals against average: Steve Mason (1.90)

The 2012–13 Philadelphia Flyers season was the franchise's 46th season in the National Hockey League (NHL). The regular season was reduced from its usual 82 games to 48 due to a lockout. The Flyers missed the Stanley Cup playoffs for the first time since 2006–07, and only the second time since 1993–94.

== Off-season ==
The Flyers first roster move of the off-season was trading backup goaltender Sergei Bobrovsky to the Columbus Blue Jackets for three draft picks the afternoon prior to the NHL entry draft. The Flyers re-signed Michael Leighton, who had spent most of the previous two seasons playing for the Adirondack Phantoms, the Flyers' American Hockey League affiliate, to a one-year contract on July 1 to replace him. Shortly after day two of the Draft, the Flyers traded James van Riemsdyk to the Toronto Maple Leafs for Luke Schenn, Brayden Schenn's older brother. The trade gave the Flyers their first pair of brothers since Ron and Rich Sutter back in the mid-1980s.

When the free agency period opened on July 1 the Flyers heavily pursued the two most coveted unrestricted free agents on the market, forward Zach Parise of the New Jersey Devils and defenseman Ryan Suter of the Nashville Predators. The Flyers lost out on both as Parise and Suter signed identical 13-year contracts worth $98 million with the Minnesota Wild on July 4. The Flyers had reportedly offered Parise a contract worth a total of $110 million. As the pursuit of Parise and Suter was occurring, the Flyers lost their two biggest unrestricted free agents, Jaromir Jagr and Matt Carle. Jagr signed a one-year contract worth $4.5 million with the Dallas Stars on July 3. He later said the Flyers requested that he wait while they pursued Parise and Suter, but Jagr did not want to wait and signed with the Stars after Dallas promised him a spot on the top line. Carle signed a six-year contract worth $33 million with the Tampa Bay Lightning on July 4. The Flyers most notable unrestricted free agent signings were former Flyer Ruslan Fedotenko to a one-year, $1.75 million contract and defenseman Bruno Gervais to a two-year, $1.65 million contract.

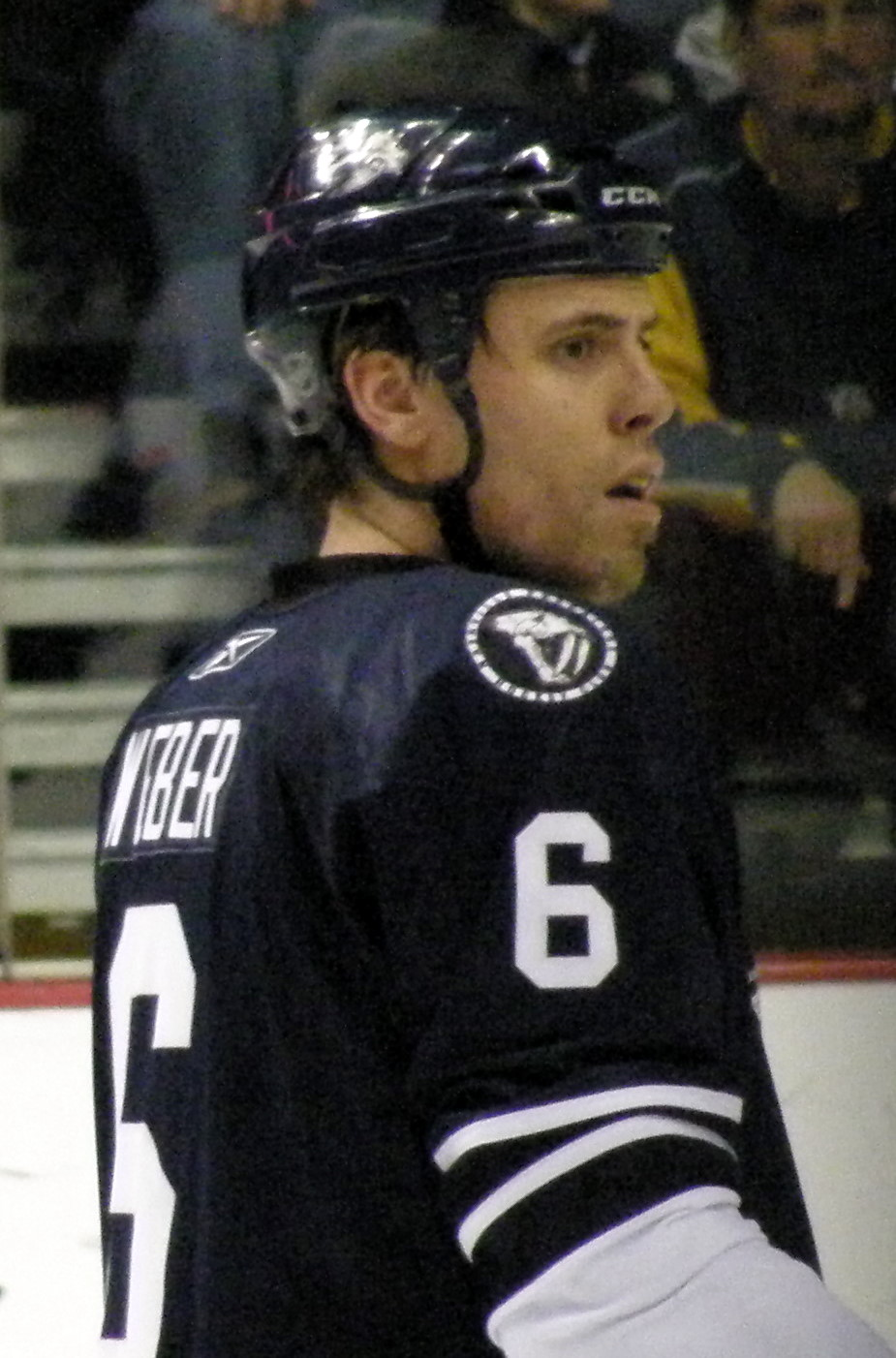
The Flyers signed Shea Weber to the richest offer sheet in NHL history.

After failing to land Suter or re-sign Carle, the Flyers signed restricted free agent defenseman Shea Weber of the Nashville Predators to a 14-year offer sheet worth $110 million, $68 million of which was a signing bonus, on July 19. The offer sheet was the richest in NHL history in terms of total money, money per season, and length, surpassing the previous offer sheet record set by Thomas Vanek. The Predators, already having lost Weber's defensive partner Suter to Minnesota, matched the offer sheet five days later. Had the Predators declined to match, they would have received the Flyers' next four first-round draft picks as compensation.

In the weeks leading up to the 2012–13 lockout, the Flyers re-signed wingers Wayne Simmonds and Scott Hartnell to six-year contract extensions. Simmonds extension was worth $23.85 million and Hartnell's $28.5 million.

With team captain Chris Pronger unlikely to return as a result of continuing post-concussion syndrome which has placed his playing career in jeopardy, the Flyers named Claude Giroux team captain on January 15 shortly after the lockout ended.

== Regular season ==
The Flyers started the season 0–3–0, the franchise's worst season start in 17 years.

The Flyers did not qualify for the Stanley Cup playoffs for the first time since the 2006–07 season and only the ninth time in team history.

The Flyers were the most penalized team during the regular season, with 184 power-play opportunities against.

=== Standings ===
Atlantic Division
| Pos | Team | GP | W | L | OTL | ROW | GF | GA | GD | Pts |
|---|---|---|---|---|---|---|---|---|---|---|
| 1 | Pittsburgh Penguins | 48 | 36 | 12 | 0 | 33 | 165 | 119 | +46 | 72 |
| 2 | New York Rangers | 48 | 26 | 18 | 4 | 22 | 130 | 112 | +18 | 56 |
| 3 | New York Islanders | 48 | 24 | 17 | 7 | 20 | 139 | 139 | 0 | 55 |
| 4 | Philadelphia Flyers | 48 | 23 | 22 | 3 | 22 | 133 | 141 | −8 | 49 |
| 5 | New Jersey Devils | 48 | 19 | 19 | 10 | 17 | 112 | 129 | −17 | 48 |

Source: National Hockey League

Eastern Conference
| Pos | Div | Team | GP | W | L | OTL | ROW | GF | GA | GD | Pts |
|---|---|---|---|---|---|---|---|---|---|---|---|
| 1 | AT | z – Pittsburgh Penguins | 48 | 36 | 12 | 0 | 33 | 165 | 119 | +46 | 72 |
| 2 | NE | y – Montreal Canadiens | 48 | 29 | 14 | 5 | 26 | 149 | 126 | +23 | 63 |
| 3 | SE | y – Washington Capitals | 48 | 27 | 18 | 3 | 24 | 149 | 130 | +19 | 57 |
| 4 | NE | x – Boston Bruins | 48 | 28 | 14 | 6 | 24 | 131 | 109 | +22 | 62 |
| 5 | NE | x – Toronto Maple Leafs | 48 | 26 | 17 | 5 | 26 | 145 | 133 | +12 | 57 |
| 6 | AT | x – New York Rangers | 48 | 26 | 18 | 4 | 22 | 130 | 112 | +18 | 56 |
| 7 | NE | x – Ottawa Senators | 48 | 25 | 17 | 6 | 21 | 116 | 104 | +12 | 56 |
| 8 | AT | x – New York Islanders | 48 | 24 | 17 | 7 | 20 | 139 | 139 | 0 | 55 |
| 9 | SE | Winnipeg Jets | 48 | 24 | 21 | 3 | 22 | 128 | 144 | −16 | 51 |
| 10 | AT | Philadelphia Flyers | 48 | 23 | 22 | 3 | 22 | 133 | 141 | −8 | 49 |
| 11 | AT | New Jersey Devils | 48 | 19 | 19 | 10 | 17 | 112 | 129 | −17 | 48 |
| 12 | NE | Buffalo Sabres | 48 | 21 | 21 | 6 | 14 | 115 | 143 | −28 | 48 |
| 13 | SE | Carolina Hurricanes | 48 | 19 | 25 | 4 | 18 | 128 | 160 | −32 | 42 |
| 14 | SE | Tampa Bay Lightning | 48 | 18 | 26 | 4 | 17 | 148 | 150 | −2 | 40 |
| 15 | SE | Florida Panthers | 48 | 15 | 27 | 6 | 12 | 112 | 171 | −59 | 36 |

Source: National Hockey League
x – Clinched playoff spot; y – Clinched division; z – Clinched conference

== Schedule and results ==
2012–13 regular season
January: 2–5–0, 4 points (home: 1–1–0; road: 1–5–0)

| Game | Date | Score | Opponent | Decision | Record | Points | Recap |
|---|---|---|---|---|---|---|---|
| 1 | January 19 | 1–3 | Pittsburgh Penguins | Bryzgalov | 0–1–0 | 0 | L |
| 2 | January 20 | 2–5 | @ Buffalo Sabres | Bryzgalov | 0–2–0 | 0 | L |
| 3 | January 22 | 0–3 | @ New Jersey Devils | Bryzgalov | 0–3–0 | 0 | L |
| 4 | January 24 | 2–1 | New York Rangers | Bryzgalov | 1–3–0 | 2 | W |
| 5 | January 26 | 7–1 | @ Florida Panthers | Bryzgalov | 2–3–0 | 4 | W |
| 6 | January 27 | 1–5 | @ Tampa Bay Lightning | Leighton | 2–4–0 | 4 | L |
| 7 | January 29 | 1–2 | @ New York Rangers | Bryzgalov | 2–5–0 | 4 | L |

February: 8–6–1, 17 points (home: 5–2–1; road: 3–4–0)

| Game | Date | Score | Opponent | Decision | Record | Points | Recap |
|---|---|---|---|---|---|---|---|
| 8 | February 1 | 2–3 | @ Washington Capitals | Bryzgalov | 2–6–0 | 4 | L |
| 9 | February 2 | 5–3 | Carolina Hurricanes | Bryzgalov | 3–6–0 | 6 | W |
| 10 | February 5 | 2–1 | Tampa Bay Lightning | Bryzgalov | 4–6–0 | 8 | W |
| 11 | February 7 | 2–3 SO | Florida Panthers | Bryzgalov | 4–6–1 | 9 | OTL |
| 12 | February 9 | 4–3 OT | Carolina Hurricanes | Bryzgalov | 5–6–1 | 11 | W |
| 13 | February 11 | 2–5 | @ Toronto Maple Leafs | Bryzgalov | 5–7–1 | 11 | L |
| 14 | February 12 | 3–2 | @ Winnipeg Jets | Bryzgalov | 6–7–1 | 13 | W |
| 15 | February 15 | 3–5 | @ New Jersey Devils | Bryzgalov | 6–8–1 | 13 | L |
| 16 | February 16 | 1–4 | @ Montreal Canadiens | Boucher | 6–9–1 | 13 | L |
| 17 | February 18 | 7–0 | @ New York Islanders | Bryzgalov | 7–9–1 | 15 | W |
| 18 | February 20 | 6–5 | @ Pittsburgh Penguins | Bryzgalov | 8–9–1 | 17 | W |
| 19 | February 21 | 2–5 | Florida Panthers | Bryzgalov | 8–10–1 | 17 | L |
| 20 | February 23 | 5–3 | Winnipeg Jets | Bryzgalov | 9–10–1 | 19 | W |
| 21 | February 25 | 2–4 | Toronto Maple Leafs | Bryzgalov | 9–11–1 | 19 | L |
| 22 | February 27 | 4–1 | Washington Capitals | Bryzgalov | 10–11–1 | 21 | W |

March: 4–6–2, 10 points (home: 4–2–1; road: 0–4–1)

| Game | Date | Score | Opponent | Decision | Record | Points | Recap |
|---|---|---|---|---|---|---|---|
| 23 | March 2 | 2–1 | Ottawa Senators | Bryzgalov | 11–11–1 | 23 | W |
| 24 | March 5 | 2–4 | @ New York Rangers | Bryzgalov | 11–12–1 | 23 | L |
| 25 | March 7 | 4–5 | Pittsburgh Penguins | Boucher | 11–13–1 | 23 | L |
| 26 | March 9 | 0–3 | @ Boston Bruins | Bryzgalov | 11–14–1 | 23 | L |
| 27 | March 10 | 3–2 | Buffalo Sabres | Bryzgalov | 12–14–1 | 25 | W |
| 28 | March 13 | 2–5 | @ New Jersey Devils | Bryzgalov | 12–15–1 | 25 | L |
| 29 | March 15 | 2–1 SO | New Jersey Devils | Bryzgalov | 13–15–1 | 27 | W |
| 30 | March 18 | 2–4 | @ Tampa Bay Lightning | Bryzgalov | 13–16–1 | 27 | L |
| 31 | March 24 | 1–2 OT | @ Pittsburgh Penguins | Bryzgalov | 13–16–2 | 28 | OTL |
| 32 | March 26 | 2–5 | New York Rangers | Bryzgalov | 13–17–2 | 28 | L |
| 33 | March 28 | 3–4 SO | New York Islanders | Bryzgalov | 13–17–3 | 29 | OTL |
| 34 | March 30 | 3–1 | Boston Bruins | Bryzgalov | 14–17–3 | 31 | W |
| 35 | March 31 | 5–4 OT | Washington Capitals | Bryzgalov | 15–17–3 | 33 | W |

April: 8–5–0, 16 points (home: 4–2–0; road: 4–3–0)

| Game | Date | Score | Opponent | Decision | Record | Points | Recap |
|---|---|---|---|---|---|---|---|
| 36 | April 3 | 5–3 | Montreal Canadiens | Bryzgalov | 16–17–3 | 35 | W |
| 37 | April 4 | 5–3 | @ Toronto Maple Leafs | Bryzgalov | 17–17–3 | 37 | W |
| 38 | April 6 | 1–4 | @ Winnipeg Jets | Bryzgalov | 17–18–3 | 37 | L |
| 39 | April 9 | 1–4 | @ New York Islanders | Mason | 17–19–3 | 37 | L |
| 40 | April 11 | 1–3 | Ottawa Senators | Bryzgalov | 17–20–3 | 37 | L |
| 41 | April 13 | 0–1 | @ Buffalo Sabres | Mason | 17–21–3 | 37 | L |
| 42 | April 15 | 7–3 | @ Montreal Canadiens | Bryzgalov | 18–21–3 | 39 | W |
| 43 | April 16 | 4–2 | New York Rangers | Mason | 19–21–3 | 41 | W |
| 44 | April 18 | 0–3 | New Jersey Devils | Bryzgalov | 19–22–3 | 41 | L |
| 45 | April 20 | 5–3 | @ Carolina Hurricanes | Mason | 20–22–3 | 43 | W |
| 46 | April 23 | 5–2 | Boston Bruins | Mason | 21–22–3 | 45 | W |
| 47 | April 25 | 2–1 | New York Islanders | Bryzgalov | 22–22–3 | 47 | W |
| 48 | April 27 | 2–1 | @ Ottawa Senators | Mason | 23–22–3 | 49 | W |

Legend: W Win (2 points) L Loss (0 points) OTL Overtime/shootout loss (1 point)

== Player statistics ==
=== Scoring ===
- Position abbreviations: C = Center; D = Defense; G = Goaltender; LW = Left wing; RW = Right wing
- † = Joined team via a transaction (e.g., trade, waivers, signing) during the season. Stats reflect time with the Flyers only.
- ‡ = Left team via a transaction (e.g., trade, waivers, release) during the season. Stats reflect time with the Flyers only.

| No. | Player | Pos | Regular season | | | | | |
| No. | Player | Pos | GP | G | A | Pts | +/- | PIM |
|---|---|---|---|---|---|---|---|---|
| 28 | Claude Giroux | C | 48 | 13 | 35 | 48 | −7 | 22 |
| 93 | Jakub Voracek | RW | 48 | 22 | 24 | 46 | −7 | 35 |
| 17 | Wayne Simmonds | RW | 45 | 15 | 17 | 32 | −7 | 82 |
| 44 | Kimmo Timonen | D | 45 | 5 | 24 | 29 | 3 | 36 |
| 10 | Brayden Schenn | C | 47 | 8 | 18 | 26 | −8 | 24 |
| 24 | Matt Read | RW | 42 | 11 | 13 | 24 | 1 | 2 |
| 48 | Danny Briere | C | 34 | 6 | 10 | 16 | −13 | 10 |
| 14 | Sean Couturier | C | 46 | 4 | 11 | 14 | −8 | 10 |
| 26 | Ruslan Fedotenko | LW | 47 | 4 | 9 | 13 | 8 | 12 |
| 19 | Scott Hartnell | LW | 32 | 8 | 3 | 11 | −5 | 70 |
| 12 | Simon Gagne† | LW | 27 | 5 | 6 | 11 | −3 | 6 |
| 22 | Luke Schenn | D | 47 | 3 | 8 | 11 | 3 | 34 |
| 25 | Maxime Talbot | C | 35 | 5 | 5 | 10 | 2 | 23 |
| 9 | Mike Knuble | RW | 28 | 4 | 4 | 8 | −4 | 20 |
| 29 | Erik Gustafsson | D | 27 | 3 | 5 | 8 | −1 | 2 |
| 27 | Bruno Gervais | D | 37 | 1 | 5 | 6 | −17 | 10 |
| 15 | Tye McGinn | LW | 18 | 3 | 2 | 5 | 0 | 19 |
| 36 | Zac Rinaldo | C | 32 | 3 | 2 | 5 | −7 | 85 |
| 5 | Braydon Coburn | D | 33 | 1 | 4 | 5 | −10 | 41 |
| 3 | Kurtis Foster | D | 23 | 1 | 4 | 5 | 0 | 25 |
| 8 | Nicklas Grossmann | D | 30 | 1 | 3 | 4 | −1 | 21 |
| 38 | Oliver Lauridsen | D | 15 | 2 | 1 | 3 | 0 | 34 |
| 30 | Ilya Bryzgalov | G | 40 | 0 | 3 | 3 | | 0 |
| 32 | Tom Sestito‡ | LW | 7 | 2 | 0 | 2 | 1 | 12 |
| 32 | Brandon Manning | D | 6 | 0 | 2 | 2 | 4 | 0 |
| 41 | Andrej Meszaros | D | 11 | 0 | 2 | 2 | −9 | 2 |
| 42 | Jason Akeson | RW | 1 | 1 | 0 | 1 | 1 | 2 |
| 37 | Jay Rosehill† | LW | 11 | 1 | 0 | 1 | −4 | 64 |
| 23 | Kent Huskins† | D | 8 | 0 | 1 | 1 | 0 | 0 |
| 35 | Steve Mason† | G | 7 | 0 | 1 | 1 | | 0 |
| 37 | Harry Zolnierczyk‡ | LW | 7 | 0 | 1 | 1 | 0 | 36 |
| 33 | Brian Boucher | G | 4 | 0 | 0 | 0 | | 0 |
| 18 | Adam Hall† | RW | 11 | 0 | 0 | 0 | −1 | 0 |
| 34 | Matt Konan | D | 2 | 0 | 0 | 0 | 0 | 0 |
| 21 | Scott Laughton | C | 5 | 0 | 0 | 0 | 0 | 0 |
| 49 | Michael Leighton‡ | G | 1 | 0 | 0 | 0 | | 0 |
| 6 | Andreas Lilja | D | 4 | 0 | 0 | 0 | −1 | 0 |
| 45 | Jody Shelley | LW | 1 | 0 | 0 | 0 | 0 | 0 |
| 11 | Eric Wellwood | LW | 4 | 0 | 0 | 0 | 0 | 0 |

=== Goaltending ===
- † = Joined team via a transaction (e.g., trade, waivers, signing) during the season. Stats reflect time with the Flyers only.
- ‡ = Left team via a transaction (e.g., trade, waivers, release) during the season. Stats reflect time with the Flyers only.

| No. | Player | Regular season | | | | | | | | | | |
| No. | Player | GP | GS | W | L | OT | SA | GA | GAA | SV% | SO | TOI |
|---|---|---|---|---|---|---|---|---|---|---|---|---|
| 30 | Ilya Bryzgalov | 40 | 40 | 19 | 17 | 3 | 1066 | 107 | 2.79 | .900 | 1 | 2,298 |
| 35 | Steve Mason† | 7 | 6 | 4 | 2 | 0 | 215 | 12 | 1.90 | .944 | 0 | 378 |
| 49 | Michael Leighton‡ | 1 | 1 | 1 | 0 | 0 | 26 | 5 | 5.07 | .808 | 0 | 59 |
| 33 | Brian Boucher | 4 | 1 | 0 | 2 | 0 | 55 | 6 | 2.50 | .891 | 0 | 144 |

== Awards and records ==
=== Awards ===
| Type | Award/honor | Recipient | Ref |
|---|---|---|---|
| League (in-season) | NHL First Star of the Week | Jakub Voracek (February 25) | |
| Team | Barry Ashbee Trophy | Kimmo Timonen | |
| Team | Bobby Clarke Trophy | Jakub Voracek | |
| Team | Gene Hart Memorial Award | Zac Rinaldo | |
| Team | Pelle Lindbergh Memorial Trophy | Jakub Voracek | |
| Team | Toyota Cup | Claude Giroux | |
| Team | Yanick Dupre Memorial Class Guy Award | Scott Hartnell | |

=== Milestones ===
| Milestone | Player | Date | Ref |
|---|---|---|---|
| First game | Scott Laughton | January 19, 2013 | |
| First game | Tye McGinn | January 22, 2013 | |
| First game | Oliver Lauridsen | March 30, 2013 | |
| First game | Matt Konan | April 25, 2013 | |
| First game | Jason Akeson | April 27, 2013 | |
| 1,000th game played | Kimmo Timonen | March 18, 2013 | |
| 750th game coached | Peter Laviolette | April 15, 2013 | |

== Transactions ==
The Flyers were involved in the following transactions from June 12, 2012, the day after the deciding game of the 2012 Stanley Cup Final, through June 24, 2013, the day of the deciding game of the 2013 Stanley Cup Final.

=== Trades ===
| Date | Details | | Ref |
|---|---|---|---|
| June 22, 2012 | To Columbus Blue Jackets: Sergei Bobrovsky | To Philadelphia Flyers: 2nd-round pick in 2012; 4th-round pick in 2012; 4th-round pick in 2013 | |
| June 23, 2012 | To Toronto Maple Leafs: James van Riemsdyk | To Philadelphia Flyers: Luke Schenn | |
| January 13, 2013 | To Carolina Hurricanes: Luke Pither | To Philadelphia Flyers: Brian Boucher; Rights to Mark Alt | |
| February 25, 2013 | To Calgary Flames: Mike Testwuide | To Philadelphia Flyers: Mitch Wahl | |
| February 26, 2013 | To Los Angeles Kings: Conditional 4th-round pick in 2013 (Note: The draft pick would become a 3rd-round pick if the Flyers qualified for the 2013 Stanley Cup playoffs; the Flyers did not qualify and the draft pick remained a 4th-round pick.) | To Philadelphia Flyers: Simon Gagne | |
| March 12, 2013 | To Columbus Blue Jackets: Matt Ford | To Philadelphia Flyers: Future considerations | |
| March 30, 2013 | To Detroit Red Wings: Conditional 7th-round pick in 2014 (Note: Detroit would receive the draft pick if the Flyers re-signed Huskins prior to October 1, 2013; the Flyers did not re-sign Huskins and retained the pick.) | To Philadelphia Flyers: Kent Huskins | |
| April 1, 2013 | To Anaheim Ducks: Harry Zolnierczyk | To Philadelphia Flyers: Jay Rosehill | |
| April 3, 2013 | To Columbus Blue Jackets: Michael Leighton; 3rd-round pick in 2015 | To Philadelphia Flyers: Steve Mason | |
| June 12, 2013 | To New York Islanders: Shane Harper; 4th-round pick in 2014 | To Philadelphia Flyers: Mark Streit | |

=== Players acquired ===
| Date | Player | Former team | Term | Via | Ref |
|---|---|---|---|---|---|
| July 3, 2012 | Cullen Eddy | Adirondack Phantoms (AHL) | 2-year | Free agency | |
| July 3, 2012 | Danny Syvret | St. Louis Blues | 2-year | Free agency | |
| July 5, 2012 | Ruslan Fedotenko | New York Rangers | 1-year | Free agency | |
| July 5, 2012 | Bruno Gervais | Tampa Bay Lightning | 2-year | Free agency | |
| January 13, 2013 | Kurtis Foster | Minnesota Wild | 1-year | Free agency | |
| January 24, 2013 | Mike Knuble | Washington Capitals | 1-year | Free agency | |
| March 1, 2013 | Brandon Alderson | Sault Ste. Marie Greyhounds (OHL) | 3-year | Free agency | |
| March 21, 2013 | Kyle Flanagan | St. Lawrence University (ECAC) | 1-year | Free agency | |
| April 3, 2013 | Adam Hall | Tampa Bay Lightning | | Waivers | |
| April 11, 2013 | Petr Straka | Baie-Comeau Drakkar (QMJHL) | 3-year | Free agency | |
| May 31, 2013 | Maxim Lamarche | Baie-Comeau Drakkar (QMJHL) | 3-year | Free agency | |
| May 31, 2013 | Michael Raffl | Leksands IF (Allsvenskan) | 1-year | Free agency | |

=== Players lost ===
| Date | Player | New team | Via (Note: In parentheses is the player's free agency group on July 1 if applicable.) | Ref |
|---|---|---|---|---|
| June 12, 2012 | Ian Laperriere | | Retirement (III) (Note: Laperriere last played during the 2009–10 season.) | |
| July 1, 2012 | Oskars Bartulis | HC Donbass (KHL) (Note: Bartulis signed with HC Donbass on August 29, 2012.) | Buyout | |
| July 1, 2012 | Blair Betts (Note: Betts, who last played during the 2010–11 season, retired.) | | Contract expiration (III) | |
| July 1, 2012 | Dan Jancevski (Note: Jancevski retired.) | | Contract expiration (III) | |
| July 3, 2012 | Jaromir Jagr | Dallas Stars | Free agency (III) | |
| July 4, 2012 | Matt Carle | Tampa Bay Lightning | Free agency (III) | |
| July 22, 2012 | Jason Bacashihua | Straubing Tigers (DEL) | Free agency (III) | |
| July 22, 2012 | Johan Backlund | Karpat (Liiga) | Free agency (III) | |
| September 16, 2012 | Pavel Kubina | HC Vítkovice Steel (ELH) | Free agency (III) | |
| September 29, 2012 | Andrew Rowe | Elmira Jackals (ECHL) | Free agency (UFA) | |
| January 25, 2013 | Niko Hovinen | Edmonton Oilers | Waivers | |
| March 1, 2013 | Tom Sestito | Vancouver Canucks | Waivers | |
| April 6, 2013 | Andreas Lilja | Rögle BK (Allsvenskan) | Free agency (Note: Contract begins with the 2013–14 season) | |

=== Signings ===
| Date | Player | Term | Contract type | Ref |
|---|---|---|---|---|
| July 1, 2012 | Michael Leighton | 1-year | Re-signing | |
| July 3, 2012 | Mike Testwuide | 1-year | Re-signing | |
| July 9, 2012 | Tom Sestito | 1-year | Re-signing | |
| July 12, 2012 | Ben Holmstrom | 1-year | Re-signing | |
| July 24, 2012 | Harry Zolnierczyk | 1-year | Re-signing | |
| July 26, 2012 | Jakub Voracek | 4-year | Re-signing | |
| August 8, 2012 | Marc-Andre Bourdon | 2-year | Re-signing | |
| August 8, 2012 | Scott Laughton | 3-year | Entry-level | |
| August 15, 2012 | Wayne Simmonds | 6-year | Extension | |
| August 20, 2012 | Scott Hartnell | 6-year | Extension | |
| February 7, 2013 | Kimmo Timonen | 1-year | Extension | |
| March 1, 2013 | Anthony Stolarz | 3-year | Entry-level | |
| March 17, 2013 | Ben Holmstrom | 1-year | Extension | |
| April 7, 2013 | Mark Alt | 3-year | Entry-level | |
| April 8, 2013 | Steve Mason | 1-year | Extension | |
| April 17, 2013 | Zac Rinaldo | 2-year | Extension | |
| April 17, 2013 | Jay Rosehill | 2-year | Extension | |

== Draft picks ==
Philadelphia's picks at the 2012 NHL entry draft, which was held at the Consol Energy Center in Pittsburgh, Pennsylvania on June 22–23, 2012. The Flyers traded their originally allotted second, third, and sixth-round picks in three different trades.

| Round | Pick | Player | Position | Nationality | Team (league) | Notes |
|---|---|---|---|---|---|---|
| 1 | 20 | Scott Laughton | Center | Canada | Oshawa Generals (OHL) | |
| 2 | 45 | Anthony Stolarz | Goaltender | United States | Corpus Christi IceRays (NAHL) | (Note: The Flyers traded Sergei Bobrovsky to the Columbus Blue Jackets for the Ottawa Senators' second-round pick, 45th overall, the Vancouver Canucks' fourth-round pick, 117th overall, and the Blue Jackets' 2013 fourth-round pick on June 22, 2012.) |
| 3 | 78 | Shayne Gostisbehere | Defense | United States | Union College (ECAC) | (Note: The Florida Panthers' third-round pick (originally San Jose Sharks pick) went to the Philadelphia Flyers as a result of a July 1, 2011 trade that sent Kris Versteeg to the Panthers in exchange for this pick.) |
| 4 | 111 | Fredric Larsson | Defense | Sweden | Brynas IF Jr (J20 SuperElit) | |
| 4 | 117 | Taylor Leier | Left wing | Canada | Portland Winterhawks (WHL) | |
| 5 | 141 | Reece Willcox | Defense | Canada | Merritt Centennials (BCHL) | |
| 7 | 201 | Valeri Vasilyev | Defense | Russia | МHC Spartak (MHL) | |

== Farm teams ==
American Hockey League – Adirondack Phantoms
ECHL – Trenton Titans
