= Erik Nyström =

Swedish professional ice hockey player (born 1993)

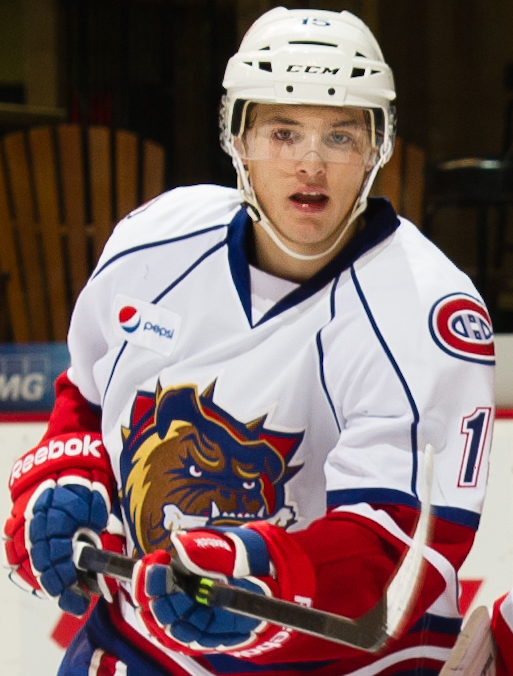
- Nyström with the Hamilton Bulldogs in 2013
- Born: October 30, 1993 (age 32) Stockholm, Sweden
- Height: 5 ft 11 in (180 cm)
- Weight: 176 lb (80 kg; 12 st 8 lb)
- Position: Left wing
- Shoots: Left
- team Former teams: Free agent Modo; KHL Medveščak Zagreb
- NHL draft: 154th overall, 2012; Montreal Canadiens
- Playing career: 2011–present

Erik Nyström (born October 30, 1993) is a Swedish professional ice hockey player who is an unrestricted free agent. He was selected in the sixth round, 154th overall, by the Montreal Canadiens in the 2012 NHL entry draft.

Nystrom made his Elitserien debut during the 2011–12 season playing 19 games with Modo.

In August 2013 it was announced by the Hamilton Bulldogs that they had signed Nyström to a 25-game professional tryout contract (PTO). After 18 games with the Bulldogs he was released from his PTO and signed with the Croatian KHL club KHL Medveščak Zagreb on November 25, 2013.

== Career statistics ==
=== Regular season and playoffs ===
			Regular season					Playoffs
Season	Team	League	GP	G	A	Pts	PIM	GP	G	A	Pts	PIM
2009-10	MODO	J18 Elit	22	18	24	42	4	-	-	-	-	-
2009-10	MODO	J18 Allsvenskan	18	6	9	15	2	1	0	0	0	0
2009–10	MODO	J20 SuperElit	4	0	2	2	0	—	—	—	—	—
2010-11	MODO	J18 Elit	5	3	10	13	2	-	-	-	-	-
2010-11	MODO	J18 Allsvenskan	9	7	7	14	0	3	0	4	4	0
2010–11	Modo Hockey	J20 SuperElit	39	6	13	19	8	6	2	1	3	0
2011–12	MODO	J20 SuperElit	32	9	19	28	16	8	5	4	9	0
2011–12	MODO	SEL	19	0	2	2	0	—	—	—	—	—
2012-13	Modo Hockey	J20 SuperElit	22	8	16	24	32	-	-	-	-	-
2012-13	Karlskrona HK (L)	HockeyAllsvenskan	23	5	6	11	4	5	0	2	2	2
SHL totals			19	0	2	2	0	-	-	-	-	-
HockeyAllsvenskan totals			23	5	6	11	4	5	0	2	2	2
J20 SuperElit totals			97	23	50	73	56	14	7	5	12	0
J18 Elit total			27	21	34	55	6	-	-	-	-	-
J18 Allsvenskan totals			27	13	16	29	2	4	0	4	4	0
