= Northeast Division (NHL) =

Division of NHL

- Formerly: Adams Division
- Conference: Eastern Conference
- League: National Hockey League
- Sport: Ice hockey
- Founded: 1993
- Folded: 2013
- Replaced by: Atlantic Division (2013–present)
- No. of teams: 5
- Most titles: Boston Bruins (5)

The National Hockey League's Northeast Division was formed in 1993 as part of the Eastern Conference in a league realignment. Its predecessor was the Adams Division. The Northeast Division lasted for 19 seasons (not including the cancelled 2004–05 season) until the 2013 league realignment, when all five of its teams were placed into the new Atlantic Division.

Although none of its members won the Stanley Cup following the realignment until the Boston Bruins' title in 2011, its members accounted for a combined 43 Stanley Cup championships (24 by Montreal, 13 by Toronto and 6 by Boston), which was the most championships of any division in the NHL prior to 2013. In 2012, the Boston Bruins became the first team to win consecutive division titles.

== Division lineups ==
=== 1993–1995 ===
1993-95 Northeast Division Teams
- Boston Bruins
- Buffalo Sabres
- Hartford Whalers
- Montreal Canadiens
- Ottawa Senators
- Pittsburgh Penguins
- Quebec Nordiques

==== Changes from the 1992–93 season ====
- The Northeast Division is formed as a result of NHL realignment
- The Boston Bruins, Buffalo Sabres, Hartford Whalers, Montreal Canadiens, Ottawa Senators, and Quebec Nordiques come from the Adams Division
- The Pittsburgh Penguins come from the Patrick Division

=== 1995–1997 ===
1995-97 Northeast Division Teams
- Boston Bruins
- Buffalo Sabres
- Hartford Whalers
- Montreal Canadiens
- Ottawa Senators
- Pittsburgh Penguins

==== Changes from the 1994–95 season ====
- The Quebec Nordiques relocate to Denver, Colorado, and become the Colorado Avalanche
- The Colorado Avalanche move to the Pacific Division

=== 1997–1998 ===
1997-98 Northeast Division Teams
- Boston Bruins
- Buffalo Sabres
- Carolina Hurricanes
- Montreal Canadiens
- Ottawa Senators
- Pittsburgh Penguins

==== Changes from the 1996–97 season ====
- The Hartford Whalers relocate to Greensboro, North Carolina, and become the Carolina Hurricanes

=== 1998–2013 ===
1998-2013 Northeast Division Teams
- Boston Bruins
- Buffalo Sabres
- Montreal Canadiens
- Ottawa Senators
- Toronto Maple Leafs

==== Changes from the 1997–98 season ====
- The Carolina Hurricanes move to the Southeast Division
- The Pittsburgh Penguins move to the Atlantic Division
- The Toronto Maple Leafs come from the Central Division

=== After the 2012–13 season ===
The Northeast Division was dissolved as the league realigned into two conferences with two divisions each. All five teams were moved into the new Atlantic Division.

== Season results ==
^{(#)}	Denotes team that won the Stanley Cup
^{(#)}	Denotes team that won the Prince of Wales Trophy, but lost Stanley Cup Final
^{(#)}	Denotes team that qualified for the Stanley Cup playoffs
‡	Denotes winner of the Presidents' Trophy

Season	1st	2nd	3rd	4th	5th	6th	7th
1993–94	^{(2)} Pittsburgh (101)	^{(4)} Boston (97)	^{(5)} Montreal (96)	^{(6)} Buffalo (95)	Quebec (76)	Hartford (63)	Ottawa (37)
1994–95^{[a]}	^{(1)} Quebec (65)	^{(3)} Pittsburgh (61)	^{(4)} Boston (57)	^{(7)} Buffalo (51)	Hartford (43)	Montreal (43)	Ottawa (23)
1995–96	^{(2)} Pittsburgh (102)	^{(5)} Boston (91)	^{(6)} Montreal (90)	Hartford (77)	Buffalo (72)	Ottawa (41)	
1996–97	^{(2)} Buffalo (92)	^{(6)} Pittsburgh (84)	^{(7)} Ottawa (77)	^{(8)} Montreal (77)	Hartford (75)	Boston (61)	
1997–98	^{(2)} Pittsburgh (98)	^{(5)} Boston (91)	^{(6)} Buffalo (89)	^{(7)} Montreal (87)	^{(8)} Ottawa (83)	Carolina (74)	
1998–99	^{(2)} Ottawa (103)	^{(4)} Toronto (97)	^{(6)} Boston (91)	^{(7)} Buffalo (91)	Montreal (75)		
1999–2000	^{(3)} Toronto (100)	^{(6)} Ottawa (95)	^{(8)} Buffalo (85)	Montreal (83)	Boston (73)		
2000–01	^{(2)} Ottawa (109)	^{(5)} Buffalo (98)	^{(7)} Toronto (90)	Boston (88)	Montreal (70)		
2001–02	^{(1)} Boston (101)	^{(4)} Toronto (100)	^{(7)} Ottawa (94)	^{(8)} Montreal (87)	Buffalo (82)		
2002–03	^{(1)} Ottawa (113)^{‡}	^{(5)} Toronto (98)	^{(7)} Boston (87)	Montreal (77)	Buffalo (72)		
2003–04	^{(2)} Boston (104)	^{(4)} Toronto (103)	^{(5)} Ottawa (102)	^{(7)} Montreal (93)	Buffalo (85)		
2004–05	No season due to 2004–05 NHL lockout						
2005–06	^{(1)} Ottawa (113)	^{(4)} Buffalo (110)	^{(7)} Montreal (93)	Toronto (90)	Boston (74)		
2006–07	^{(1)} Buffalo (113)^{‡}	^{(4)} Ottawa (105)	Toronto (91)	Montreal (90)	Boston (76)		
2007–08	^{(1)} Montreal (104)	^{(7)} Ottawa (94)	^{(8)} Boston (94)	Buffalo (90)	Toronto (83)		
2008–09	^{(1)} Boston (116)	^{(8)} Montreal (93)	Buffalo (91)	Ottawa (83)	Toronto (81)		
2009–10	^{(3)} Buffalo (100)	^{(5)} Ottawa (94)	^{(6)} Boston (91)	^{(8)} Montreal (88)	Toronto (74)		
2010–11	^{(3)} Boston (103)	^{(6)} Montreal (96)	^{(7)} Buffalo (96)	Toronto (85)	Ottawa (74)		
2011–12	^{(2)} Boston (102)	^{(8)} Ottawa (92)	Buffalo (89)	Toronto (80)	Montreal (78)		
2012–13^{[b]}	^{(2)} Montreal (63)	^{(4)} Boston (62)	^{(5)} Toronto (57)	^{(7)} Ottawa (56)	Buffalo (48)		

Notes

- ^{a} The 1994–95 NHL season was shortened to 48 games due to the lockout.
- ^{b} The 2012–13 NHL season was shortened to 48 games due to the lockout.

== Northeast Division titles won by team ==
Team	Wins	Last win
Boston Bruins	5	2012
Ottawa Senators	4	2006
Pittsburgh Penguins	3	1998
Buffalo Sabres	3	2010
Montreal Canadiens	2	2013
Quebec Nordiques	1	1995
Toronto Maple Leafs	1	2000
Hartford Whalers/Carolina Hurricanes	0	—
