= Southeast Division (NHL) =

Division of the National Hockey League

- Conference: Eastern Conference
- League: National Hockey League
- Sport: Ice hockey
- Founded: 1998
- Folded: 2013
- Replaced by: Atlantic Division and Metropolitan Division
- No. of teams: 5
- Most titles: Washington Capitals (7)

The National Hockey League's Southeast Division was formed in 1998 as part of the Eastern Conference due to expansion. The division lasted for 14 seasons (not including the cancelled 2004–05 season) until 2013. The division was intended to group teams primarily in the Southeastern United States. Its original members were the Carolina Hurricanes, Florida Panthers, Tampa Bay Lightning, and Washington Capitals. The expansion Atlanta Thrashers joined the division in 1999. The Thrashers' relocation to Winnipeg in 2011 to become the new Winnipeg Jets spurred talks for what became a league realignment in 2013; the Jets still played in the Southeast during the division's final two seasons.

== Division lineups ==
=== 1998–1999 ===
1998–1999 Southeast Division Teams
- Carolina Hurricanes
- Florida Panthers
- Tampa Bay Lightning
- Washington Capitals

==== Changes from the 1997–98 season ====
- The Southeast Division is formed as a result of NHL realignment
- The Florida Panthers, Tampa Bay Lightning, and Washington Capitals come from the original Atlantic Division
- The Carolina Hurricanes come from the Northeast Division

=== 1999–2011 ===
1999–2011 Southeast Division Teams
- Atlanta Thrashers
- Carolina Hurricanes
- Florida Panthers
- Tampa Bay Lightning
- Washington Capitals

==== Changes from the 1998–99 season ====
- The Atlanta Thrashers are added as an expansion team
- The Carolina Hurricanes relocate to their intended permanent home of Raleigh, North Carolina after spending two seasons in Greensboro, North Carolina

=== 2011–2013 ===
2011–2013 Southeast Division Teams
- Carolina Hurricanes
- Florida Panthers
- Tampa Bay Lightning
- Washington Capitals
- Winnipeg Jets

==== Changes from the 2010–11 season ====
- The Atlanta Thrashers relocate to Winnipeg, Manitoba, and become the new Winnipeg Jets

=== After the 2012–13 season ===
The NHL dissolved the Southeast Division as the league realigned into two conferences with two divisions each. The Winnipeg Jets moved to the Western Conference and the Central Division. The Florida Panthers and Tampa Bay Lightning were placed into the new Atlantic Division. The Carolina Hurricanes and Washington Capitals were placed in the newly formed Metropolitan Division.

== Season results ==
^{(#)}	Denotes team that won the Stanley Cup
^{(#)}	Denotes team that won the Prince of Wales Trophy, but lost Stanley Cup Final
^{(#)}	Denotes team that qualified for the Stanley Cup playoffs
‡	Denotes winner of the Presidents' Trophy

Season	1st	2nd	3rd	4th	5th
1998–99	^{(3)} Carolina (86)	Florida (78)	Washington (68)	Tampa Bay (47)	
1999–2000	^{(2)} Washington (102)	^{(5)} Florida (98)	Carolina (84)	Tampa Bay (54)	Atlanta (39)
2000–01	^{(3)} Washington (96)	^{(8)} Carolina (88)	Florida (66)	Atlanta (60)	Tampa Bay (59)
2001–02	^{(3)} Carolina (91)	Washington (85)	Tampa Bay (69)	Florida (60)	Atlanta (54)
2002–03	^{(3)} Tampa Bay (93)	^{(6)} Washington (92)	Atlanta (74)	Florida (70)	Carolina (61)
2003–04	^{(1)} Tampa Bay (106)	Atlanta (78)	Carolina (76)	Florida (75)	Washington (59)
2004–05	No season due to 2004–05 NHL lockout				
2005–06	^{(2)} Carolina (112)	^{(8)} Tampa Bay (92)	Atlanta (90)	Florida (85)	Washington (70)
2006–07	^{(3)} Atlanta (97)	^{(7)} Tampa Bay (93)	Carolina (88)	Florida (86)	Washington (70)
2007–08	^{(3)} Washington (94)	Carolina (92)	Florida (85)	Atlanta (76)	Tampa Bay (71)
2008–09	^{(2)} Washington (108)	^{(6)} Carolina (97)	Florida (93)	Atlanta (76)	Tampa Bay (66)
2009–10	^{(1)} Washington (121)^{‡}	Atlanta (83)	Carolina (80)	Tampa Bay (80)	Florida (77)
2010–11	^{(1)} Washington (107)	^{(5)} Tampa Bay (103)	Carolina (91)	Atlanta (80)	Florida (72)
2011–12	^{(3)} Florida (94)	^{(7)} Washington (92)	Tampa Bay (84)	Winnipeg (84)	Carolina (82)
2012–13^{[a]}	^{(3)} Washington (57)	Winnipeg (51)	Carolina (42)	Tampa Bay (40)	Florida (36)

Notes

- ^{a} The 2012–13 NHL season was shortened to 48 games due to the lockout.

== Southeast Division titles won by team ==
Team	Wins	Last win
Washington Capitals	7	2013
Carolina Hurricanes	3	2006
Tampa Bay Lightning	2	2004
Atlanta Thrashers/Winnipeg Jets	1	2007
Florida Panthers	1	2012
