= 2012–13 Buffalo Sabres season =

NHL hockey team season

2012–13 Buffalo Sabres
- Division: 5th Northeast
- Conference: 12th Eastern
- 2012–13 record: 21–21–6
- Home record: 11–10–3
- Road record: 10–11–3
- Goals for: 125
- Goals against: 143

Team information
- General manager: Darcy Regier
- Coach: Lindy Ruff (Oct.–Feb.); Ron Rolston (interim, Feb.–Apr.)
- Captain: Jason Pominville (Oct.–Apr.); Vacant (Apr.)
- Alternate captains: Steve Ott (Apr.); Drew Stafford; Thomas Vanek
- Arena: First Niagara Center
- Average attendance: 18,970 (99.5%)

Team leaders
- Goals: Thomas Vanek (20)
- Assists: Thomas Vanek (21) and Tyler Ennis (21)
- Points: Thomas Vanek (41)
- Penalty minutes: Steve Ott (93)
- Plus/minus: Jochen Hecht, Christian Ehrhoff, and Brian Flynn (+6)
- Wins: Ryan Miller (17)
- Goals against average: Jhonas Enroth (2.60)

The 2012–13 Buffalo Sabres season was the 43rd season for the National Hockey League (NHL) franchise that was established on May 22, 1970. The regular season was reduced from its usual 82 games to 48 due to a lockout. The season was the 15th and final season coached by Lindy Ruff, who was fired after a 6–10–1 start. The Sabres failed to qualify for the Stanley Cup playoffs for the second consecutive season.

== Off-season ==
=== Broadcast changes ===
On June 8, 2012, the Sabres announced that Rick Jeanneret, the longest-tenured play-by-play announcer in NHL history, would be inducted into the Hockey Hall of Fame; Jeanneret will also receive the Foster Hewitt Memorial Award. Rob Ray will replace Harry Neale as the full-time color commentator for all Sabres game broadcasts. Neale will join Mike Robitaille, whose role will remain unchanged, and Brian Duff, who will take over as full-time studio host, in the studio. Kevin Sylvester and Danny Gare, who served as the alternate broadcast team in 2011–12, were not originally going to reprise their roles in 2012–13; Sylvester instead revived the Hockey Hotline, a long-discontinued Sabres call-in talk show, for WGR. However, due to Jeanneret suffering an illness, Sylvester was pressed into service to call play-by-play for the first four games of the regular season.

=== Alumni Plaza ===
On July 12, 2012, the Sabres announced that the plaza adjacent to First Niagara Center would be re-branded Alumni Plaza. On October 12, 2012, a bronze French Connection statue was added to the plaza. Other plans included plaques with the name of every player to play a game for the team and fans having to opportunity to buy engraved bricks.

=== Lockout ===
On September 13, 2012, Buffalo Sabres owner Terrence Pegula, along with all 28 other league ownership groups (the League still collectively owns the Phoenix Coyotes), authorized NHL Commissioner Gary Bettman to lock-out the National Hockey League Players' Association (NHLPA) upon the expiration of the NHL Collective Bargaining Agreement (CBA) on September 15. The lockout ended at 4:45 am EST on January 6, 2013, lasting 113 days. The lockout reduced the regular season from 82 to 48 games.

=== Overseas Sabres ===
After the announced lockout, players from the team began to sign contracts to play in Europe until resumption of NHL play.

Overseas Sabres
| Player | New team | League |
|---|---|---|
| Thomas Vanek | Graz 99ers | (Austria) Austrian Hockey League |
| Tyler Ennis | SCL Tigers | (Switzerland) Swiss National League |
| Andrej Sekera | Slovan Bratislava | (Slovakia) Kontinental Hockey League |
| Christian Ehrhoff | Krefeld Pinguine | (Germany) Deutsche Eishockey Liga |
| Jhonas Enroth | Huddinge IK | (Sweden) Swedish Division 1 |
| Mike Weber | Lorenskog | (Norway) GET-ligaen. |
| Jason Pominville | Adler Mannheim | (Germany) Deutsche Eishockey Liga |
| Jochen Hecht | Adler Mannheim | (Germany) Deutsche Eishockey Liga |
| Alexander Sulzer | ERC Ingolstadt | (Germany) Deutsche Eishockey Liga |
| Tyler Myers | Klagenfurt AC | (Austria) Austrian Hockey League |

=== Beyond Blue and Gold ===
During the abbreviated training camp the team released the first episodes in a new web-series called Beyond Blue and Gold. The series will run through the season with the goal to give fans an "all-access pass to the entire Sabres organization throughout the entire 2012–13 NHL season."

== Regular season ==
After the lockout, the Sabres had an abbreviated one-week training camp. During the camp, the Sabres' first pick in the 2012 NHL entry draft, Mikhail Grigorenko, played well on a line with off-season trade acquisitions Steve Ott and Ville Leino. At the end of the camp, Grigorenko was put on the opening day roster. The Sabres were given five games to decide whether to keep him on the roster (and thus pay him a full season's salary) or send him back to his junior team, the Quebec Remparts; in the end, Grigorenko was kept on the roster after Leino suffered an injury. After several weeks of mediocre play and Leino's return to the active roster, Grigorenko returned to the Remparts. He remained with the Remparts until their elimination from the QMJHL playoffs, whereupon he returned to the Sabres.

After an unsuccessful 6–10–1 start, general manager Darcy Regier announced the firing of head coach Lindy Ruff Ruff coached the team since 1997 and was the team's most successful coach. It was further announced that Ron Rolston, who was the current coach of the Rochester Americans, would replace Ruff on an interim basis. The Sabres performed better under Rolston but were nonetheless eliminated from playoff contention following an 8–4 home loss to the New York Rangers.

The Sabres allowed the most shorthanded goals in the NHL, with seven.

== Playoffs ==
The Sabres did not qualify for the playoffs for the second consecutive year.

== Standings ==
Northeast Division
| Pos | Team | GP | W | L | OTL | ROW | GF | GA | GD | Pts |
|---|---|---|---|---|---|---|---|---|---|---|
| 1 | y – Montreal Canadiens | 48 | 29 | 14 | 5 | 26 | 149 | 126 | +23 | 63 |
| 2 | x – Boston Bruins | 48 | 28 | 14 | 6 | 24 | 131 | 109 | +22 | 62 |
| 3 | x – Toronto Maple Leafs | 48 | 26 | 17 | 5 | 26 | 145 | 133 | +12 | 57 |
| 4 | x – Ottawa Senators | 48 | 25 | 17 | 6 | 21 | 116 | 104 | +12 | 56 |
| 5 | Buffalo Sabres | 48 | 21 | 21 | 6 | 14 | 125 | 143 | −18 | 48 |

Source: National Hockey League
x – Clinched playoff spot; y – Clinched division

Eastern Conference
| Pos | Div | Team | GP | W | L | OTL | ROW | GF | GA | GD | Pts |
|---|---|---|---|---|---|---|---|---|---|---|---|
| 1 | AT | z – Pittsburgh Penguins | 48 | 36 | 12 | 0 | 33 | 165 | 119 | +46 | 72 |
| 2 | NE | y – Montreal Canadiens | 48 | 29 | 14 | 5 | 26 | 149 | 126 | +23 | 63 |
| 3 | SE | y – Washington Capitals | 48 | 27 | 18 | 3 | 24 | 149 | 130 | +19 | 57 |
| 4 | NE | x – Boston Bruins | 48 | 28 | 14 | 6 | 24 | 131 | 109 | +22 | 62 |
| 5 | NE | x – Toronto Maple Leafs | 48 | 26 | 17 | 5 | 26 | 145 | 133 | +12 | 57 |
| 6 | AT | x – New York Rangers | 48 | 26 | 18 | 4 | 22 | 130 | 112 | +18 | 56 |
| 7 | NE | x – Ottawa Senators | 48 | 25 | 17 | 6 | 21 | 116 | 104 | +12 | 56 |
| 8 | AT | x – New York Islanders | 48 | 24 | 17 | 7 | 20 | 139 | 139 | 0 | 55 |
| 9 | SE | Winnipeg Jets | 48 | 24 | 21 | 3 | 22 | 128 | 144 | −16 | 51 |
| 10 | AT | Philadelphia Flyers | 48 | 23 | 22 | 3 | 22 | 133 | 141 | −8 | 49 |
| 11 | AT | New Jersey Devils | 48 | 19 | 19 | 10 | 17 | 112 | 129 | −17 | 48 |
| 12 | NE | Buffalo Sabres | 48 | 21 | 21 | 6 | 14 | 115 | 143 | −28 | 48 |
| 13 | SE | Carolina Hurricanes | 48 | 19 | 25 | 4 | 18 | 128 | 160 | −32 | 42 |
| 14 | SE | Tampa Bay Lightning | 48 | 18 | 26 | 4 | 17 | 148 | 150 | −2 | 40 |
| 15 | SE | Florida Panthers | 48 | 15 | 27 | 6 | 12 | 112 | 171 | −59 | 36 |

Source: National Hockey League
x – Clinched playoff spot; y – Clinched division; z – Clinched conference

== Schedule and results ==
=== Original regular season schedule ===
2012–13 Original Schedule (For reference only)
October

| Game | October | Opponent | Score | Decision | Location/Attendance | Record |
|---|---|---|---|---|---|---|
| 1 | 13 | Pittsburgh Penguins | | | First Niagara Center | |
| 2 | 16 | Detroit Red Wings | | | First Niagara Center | |
| 3 | 19 | New York Rangers | | | First Niagara Center | |
| 4 | 20 | @ New York Islanders | | | Nassau Veterans Memorial Coliseum | |
| 5 | 24 | New Jersey Devils | | | First Niagara Center | |
| 6 | 26 | @ New Jersey Devils | | | Prudential Center | |
| 7 | 28 | Philadelphia Flyers | | | First Niagara Center | |
| 8 | 30 | @ Boston Bruins | | | TD Garden | |

November

| Game | November | Opponent | Score | Decision | Location/Attendance | Record |
|---|---|---|---|---|---|---|
| 9 | 1 | Phoenix Coyotes | | | First Niagara Center | |
| 10 | 3 | Carolina Hurricanes | | | First Niagara Center | |
| 11 | 6 | @ Philadelphia Flyers | | | Wells Fargo Center | |
| 12 | 8 | @ San Jose Sharks | | | HP Pavilion at San Jose | |
| 13 | 10 | @ Phoenix Coyotes | | | Jobing.com Arena | |
| 14 | 11 | @ Anaheim Ducks | | | Honda Center | |
| 15 | 16 | Philadelphia Flyers | | | First Niagara Center | |
| 16 | 17 | @ Philadelphia Flyers | | | Wells Fargo Center | |
| 17 | 21 | Columbus Blue Jackets | | | First Niagara Center | |
| 18 | 24 | @New York Islanders | | | Nassau Veterans Memorial Coliseum | |
| 19 | 27 | Winnipeg Jets | | | First Niagara Center | |
| 20 | 29 | Vancouver Canucks | | | First Niagara Center | |

December

| Game | December | Opponent | Score | Decision | Location/Attendance | Record |
|---|---|---|---|---|---|---|
| 21 | 1 | @Boston Bruins | | | TD Garden | |
| 22 | 3 | @Toronto Maple Leafs | | | Air Canada Centre | |
| 23 | 4 | San Jose Sharks | | | First Niagara Center | |
| 24 | 6 | Montreal Canadiens | | | First Niagara Center | |
| 25 | 8 | @Montreal Canadiens | | | Bell Centre | |
| 26 | 11 | Ottawa Senators | | | First Niagara Center | |
| 27 | 13 | Chicago Blackhawks | | | First Niagara Center | |
| 28 | 15 | Montreal Canadiens | | | First Niagara Center | |
| 29 | 17 | @Montreal Canadiens | | | Bell Centre | |
| 30 | 20 | @Edmonton Oilers | | | Rexall Place | |
| 31 | 22 | @Calgary Flames | | | Scotiabank Saddledome | |
| 32 | 23 | @Colorado Avalanche | | | Pepsi Center | |
| 33 | 26 | Washington Capitals | | | First Niagara Center | |
| 34 | 28 | @Minnesota Wild | | | Xcel Energy Center | |
| 35 | 29 | @Winnipeg Jets | | | MTS Centre | |
| 36 | 31 | Ottawa Senators | | | First Niagara Center | |

January

| Game | January | Opponent | Score | Decision | Location/Attendance | Record |
|---|---|---|---|---|---|---|
| 37 | 3 | Florida Panthers | | | First Niagara Center | |
| 38 | 5 | Tampa Bay Lightning | | | First Niagara Center | |
| 39 | 8 | @New York Rangers | | | Madison Square Garden | |
| 40 | 9 | Boston Bruins | | | First Niagara Center | |
| 41 | 11 | @Ottawa Senators | | | Scotiabank Place | |
| 42 | 13 | @Chicago Blackhawks | | | United Center | |
| 43 | 15 | @Ottawa Senators | | | Scotiabank Place | |
| 44 | 17 | New York Islanders | | | First Niagara Center | |
| 45 | 19 | Carolina Hurricanes | | | First Niagara Center | |
| 46 | 21 | Tampa Bay Lightning | | | First Niagara Center | |
| 47 | 29 | Toronto Maple Leafs | | | First Niagara Center | |
| 48 | 31 | @Carolina Hurricanes | | | PNC Arena | |

February

| Game | February | Opponent | Score | Decision | Location/Attendance | Record |
|---|---|---|---|---|---|---|
| 49 | 3 | St. Louis Blues | | | First Niagara Center | |
| 50 | 5 | Los Angeles Kings | | | First Niagara Center | |
| 51 | 6 | @Boston Bruins | | | TD Garden | |
| 52 | 8 | Boston Bruins | | | First Niagara Center | |
| 53 | 10 | Ottawa Senators | | | First Niagara Center | |
| 54 | 12 | @Ottawa Senators | | | Scotiabank Place | |
| 55 | 15 | Montreal Canadiens | | | First Niagara Center | |
| 56 | 17 | Pittsburgh Penguins | | | First Niagara Center | |
| 57 | 18 | @New York Rangers | | | Madison Square Garden | |
| 58 | 21 | @Washington Capitals | | | Verizon Center | |
| 59 | 23 | New York Islanders | | | First Niagara Center | |
| 60 | 26 | @Tampa Bay Lightning | | | Tampa Bay Times Forum | |
| 61 | 28 | @Florida Panthers | | | BB&T Center | |

March

| Game | March | Opponent | Score | Decision | Location/Attendance | Record |
|---|---|---|---|---|---|---|
| 62 | 2 | Nashville Predators | | | First Niagara Center | |
| 63 | 5 | @Carolina Hurricanes | | | PNC Arena | |
| 64 | 7 | @New Jersey Devils | | | Prudential Center | |
| 65 | 10 | @Pittsburgh Penguins | | | Consol Energy Center | |
| 66 | 12 | Florida Panthers | | | First Niagara Center | |
| 67 | 14 | @Toronto Maple Leafs | | | First Niagara Center | |
| 68 | 16 | @Pittsburgh Penguins | | | Consol Energy Center | |
| 69 | 17 | @Washington Capitals | | | Verizon Center | |
| 70 | 19 | Toronto Maple Leafs | | | First Niagara Center | |
| 71 | 21 | Winnipeg Jets | | | First Niagara Center | |
| 72 | 23 | @Dallas Stars | | | American Airlines Center | |
| 73 | 26 | @Tampa Bay Lightning | | | Tampa Bay Times Forum | |
| 74 | 28 | @Florida Panthers | | | BB&T Center | |
| 75 | 30 | Washington Capitals | | | First Niagara Center | |

April

| Game | April | Opponent | Score | Decision | Location/Attendance | Record |
|---|---|---|---|---|---|---|
| 76 | 2 | Toronto Maple Leafs | | | First Niagara Center | |
| 77 | 4 | New Jersey Devils | | | First Niagara Center | |
| 78 | 6 | @Montreal Canadiens | | | Bell Centre | |
| 79 | 8 | @Toronto Maple Leafs | | | Air Canada Centre | |
| 80 | 9 | @Winnipeg Jets | | | MTS Centre | |
| 81 | 11 | New York Rangers | | | First Niagara Center | |
| 82 | 13 | Boston Bruins | | | First Niagara Center | |

2012–2013 Schedule

=== Revised regular season schedule ===
2012–13 Game Log
Overall: 21–21–6 (Home: 11–10–3; Away: 10–11–3)
January: 3–3–1 (Home: 1–1–1; Road: 2–2–0)

| Game | January | Opponent | Score | Decision | Location/Attendance | Record |
|---|---|---|---|---|---|---|
| 1 | 20 | Philadelphia Flyers | 5–2 | Miller (1–0–0) | First Niagara Center (19,070) | 1–0–0 |
| 2 | 21 | @Toronto Maple Leafs | 2–1 | Miller (2–0–0) | Air Canada Centre (19,475) | 2–0–0 |
| 3 | 24 | @Carolina Hurricanes | 3–6 | Enroth (0–1–0) | PNC Arena (18,081) | 2–1–0 |
| 4 | 25 | Carolina Hurricanes | 1–3 | Miller (2–1–0) | First Niagara Center (18,824) | 2–2–0 |
| 5 | 27 | @Washington Capitals | 2–3 | Miller (2–2–0) | Verizon Center (18,506) | 2–3–0 |
| 6 | 29 | Toronto Maple Leafs | 3–4 (OT) | Miller (2–2–1) | First Niagara Center (18,801) | 2–3–1 |
| 7 | 31 | @Boston Bruins | 7–4 | Miller (3–2–1) | TD Garden (17,565) | 3–3–1 |

February: 5–9–0 (Home: 2–5–0; Road: 3–4–0)

| Game | February | Opponent | Score | Decision | Location/Attendance | Record |
|---|---|---|---|---|---|---|
| 8 | 2 | @Montreal Canadiens | 1–6 | Miller (3–3–1) | Bell Centre (21,273) | 3–4–1 |
| 9 | 3 | Florida Panthers | 3–4 | Miller (3–4–1) | First Niagara Center (18,831) | 3–5–1 |
| 10 | 5 | @Ottawa Senators | 3–4 | Enroth (0–2–0) | Scotiabank Place (18,345) | 3–6–1 |
| 11 | 7 | Montreal Canadiens | 5–4 (SO) | Miller (4–4–1) | First Niagara Center (18,866) | 4–6–1 |
| 12 | 9 | @New York Islanders | 3–2 | Miller (5–4–1) | Nassau Coliseum (12,608) | 5–6–1 |
| 13 | 10 | Boston Bruins | 1–3 | Miller (5–5–1) | First Niagara Center (18,869) | 5–7–1 |
| 14 | 12 | @Ottawa Senators | 0–2 | Miller (5–6–1) | Scotiabank Place (18,429) | 5–8–1 |
| 15 | 15 | Boston Bruins | 4–2 | Miller (6–6–1) | First Niagara Center (19,070) | 6–8–1 |
| 16 | 17 | Pittsburgh Penguins | 3–4 | Miller (6–7–1) | First Niagara Center (19,070) | 6–9–1 |
| 17 | 19 | Winnipeg Jets | 1–2 | Miller (6–8–1) | First Niagara Center (19,070) | 6–10–1 |
| 18 | 21 | @Toronto Maple Leafs | 1–3 | Miller (6–9–1) | Air Canada Centre (19,473) | 6–11–1 |
| 19 | 23 | New York Islanders | 0–4 | Miller (6–10–1) | First Niagara Center (19,070) | 6–12–1 |
| 20 | 26 | @Tampa Bay Lightning | 2–1 | Miller (7–10–1) | Tampa Bay Times Forum (19,204) | 7–12–1 |
| 21 | 28 | @Florida Panthers | 4–3 (SO) | Miller (8–10–1) | BB&T Center (15,672) | 8–12–1 |

March: 5–5–5 (Home: 3–1–2; Road: 2–4–3)

| Game | March | Opponent | Score | Decision | Location/Attendance | Record |
|---|---|---|---|---|---|---|
| 22 | 2 | New Jersey Devils | 4–3 (SO) | Miller (9–10–1) | First Niagara Center (19,070) | 9–12–1 |
| 23 | 3 | @New York Rangers | 2–3 (SO) | Miller (9–10–2) | Madison Square Garden (17,200) | 9–12–2 |
| 24 | 5 | @Carolina Hurricanes | 3–4 | Miller (9–11–2) | PNC Arena (15,277) | 9–13–2 |
| 25 | 7 | @New Jersey Devils | 2–3 (SO) | Miller (9–11–3) | Prudential Center (17,625) | 9–13–3 |
| 26 | 10 | @Philadelphia Flyers | 2–3 | Miller (9–12–3) | Wells Fargo Center (19,687) | 9–14–3 |
| 27 | 12 | New York Rangers | 3–1 | Enroth (1–2–0) | First Niagara Center (19,070) | 10–14–3 |
| 28 | 16 | Ottawa Senators | 3–4 (OT) | Miller (9–12–4) | First Niagara Center (19,070) | 10–14–4 |
| 29 | 17 | @Washington Capitals | 3–5 | Miller (9–13–4) | Verizon Center (18,506) | 10–15–4 |
| 30 | 19 | @Montreal Canadiens | 3–2 (OT) | Enroth (2–2–0) | Bell Centre (21,273) | 11–15–4 |
| 31 | 21 | Toronto Maple Leafs | 5–4 (SO) | Miller (10–13–4) | First Niagara Center (19,070) | 12–15–4 |
| 32 | 23 | @Montreal Canadiens | 2–1 | Miller (11–13–4) | Bell Centre (21,273) | 13–15–4 |
| 33 | 26 | @Tampa Bay Lightning | 1–2 | Miller (11–14–4) | Tampa Bay Times Forum (19,204) | 13–16–4 |
| 34 | 28 | @Florida Panthers | 4–5 (SO) | Miller (11–14–5) | BB&T Center (17,044) | 13–16–5 |
| 35 | 30 | Washington Capitals | 3–4 (SO) | Enroth (2–2–1) | First Niagara Center (19,070) | 13–16–6 |
| 36 | 31 | Boston Bruins | 0–2 | Miller (11–15–5) | First Niagara Center (19,027) | 13–17–6 |

April: 8–4–0 (Home: 5–3–0; Road: 3–1–0)

| Game | April | Opponent | Score | Decision | Location/Attendance | Record |
|---|---|---|---|---|---|---|
| 37 | 2 | @Pittsburgh Penguins | 4–1 | Miller (12–15–5) | Consol Energy Center (18,642) | 14–17–6 |
| 38 | 5 | Ottawa Senators | 4–2 | Miller (13–15–5) | First Niagara Center (18,811) | 15–17–6 |
| 39 | 7 | New Jersey Devils | 3–2 (SO) | Miller (14–15–5) | First Niagara Center (18,703) | 16–17–6 |
| 40 | 9 | @Winnipeg Jets | 1–4 | Miller (14–16–5) | MTS Centre (15,004) | 16–18–6 |
| 41 | 11 | Montreal Canadiens | 1–5 | Miller (14–17–5) | First Niagara Center (19,070) | 16–19–6 |
| 42 | 13 | Philadelphia Flyers | 1–0 | Enroth (3–2–1) | First Niagara Center (19,070) | 17–19–6 |
| 43 | 14 | Tampa Bay Lightning | 3–1 | Enroth (4–2–1) | First Niagara Center (18,991) | 18–19–6 |
| 44 | 17 | @Boston Bruins | 3–2 (SO) | Miller (15–17–5) | TD Garden (17,565) | 19–19–6 |
| 45 | 19 | New York Rangers | 4–8 | Enroth (4–3–1) | First Niagara Center (19,003) | 19–20–6 |
| – | 20 | @Pittsburgh Penguins | Game rescheduled to April 23 due to effects on Pittsburgh's schedule resulting from the manhunt for the Boston Marathon bombing suspect. | | | |
| 46 | 22 | Winnipeg Jets | 1–2 | Enroth (4–4–1) | First Niagara Center (18,654) | 19–21–6 |
| 47 | 23 | @Pittsburgh Penguins | 4–2 | Miller (16–17–5) | Consol Energy Center (18,630) | 20–21–6 |
| 48 | 26 | New York Islanders | 2–1 (SO) | Miller (17–17–5) | First Niagara Center (19,070) | 21–21–6 |

Legend: Win (2 points) Loss (0 points) Overtime/shootout loss (1 point)

== Player statistics ==
Final regular season stats

Skaters

Regular season
| Player | GP | G | A | Pts | +/- | PIM |
|---|---|---|---|---|---|---|
| Thomas Vanek | 38 | 20 | 21 | 41 | −1 | 20 |
| Cody Hodgson | 48 | 15 | 19 | 34 | −4 | 20 |
| Tyler Ennis | 47 | 10 | 21 | 31 | −14 | 16 |
| Jason Pominville^{‡} | 37 | 10 | 15 | 25 | 1 | 8 |
| Steve Ott | 48 | 9 | 15 | 24 | 3 | 93 |
| Christian Ehrhoff | 47 | 5 | 17 | 22 | 6 | 34 |
| Marcus Foligno | 47 | 5 | 13 | 18 | −4 | 41 |
| Drew Stafford | 46 | 6 | 12 | 18 | −16 | 21 |
| Jochen Hecht | 47 | 5 | 9 | 14 | 6 | 18 |
| Andrej Sekera | 37 | 2 | 10 | 12 | −2 | 4 |
| Brian Flynn | 26 | 6 | 5 | 11 | 6 | 0 |
| Nathan Gerbe | 42 | 5 | 5 | 10 | −3 | 14 |
| Kevin Porter | 31 | 4 | 5 | 9 | −1 | 10 |
| Jordan Leopold^{‡} | 24 | 2 | 6 | 8 | −6 | 14 |
| Tyler Myers | 39 | 3 | 5 | 8 | −8 | 32 |
| Mike Weber | 42 | 1 | 6 | 7 | 3 | 70 |
| Ville Leino | 8 | 2 | 4 | 6 | 0 | 6 |
| Mikhail Grigorenko | 25 | 1 | 4 | 5 | −1 | 0 |
| Mark Pysyk | 19 | 1 | 4 | 5 | −7 | 0 |
| Alexander Sulzer | 17 | 3 | 1 | 4 | 3 | 10 |
| Adam Pardy | 17 | 0 | 4 | 4 | 4 | 14 |
| Robyn Regehr^{‡} | 29 | 0 | 2 | 2 | −4 | 21 |
| Luke Adam | 4 | 1 | 0 | 1 | 1 | 2 |
| Patrick Kaleta | 34 | 1 | 0 | 1 | −4 | 67 |
| T. J. Brennan^{‡} | 10 | 1 | 0 | 1 | −1 | 6 |
| Cody McCormick | 8 | 0 | 0 | 0 | −2 | 10 |
| Matt Ellis | 6 | 0 | 0 | 0 | 0 | 0 |
| John Scott | 34 | 0 | 0 | 0 | −1 | 69 |
| Chad Ruhwedel | 7 | 0 | 0 | 0 | 0 | 0 |
| Totals* | 48 | 118 | 203 | 321 | −46 | 630 |

*Totals include goaltenders (G/A/Pts/PIM) and bench minors (PIM)

Goaltenders

Regular season
| Player | GP | GS | TOI | W | L | OT | GA | GAA | SA | SV% | SO | G | A | PIM |
|---|---|---|---|---|---|---|---|---|---|---|---|---|---|---|
| Ryan Miller | 40 | 39 | 2302:14 | 17 | 17 | 5 | 108 | 2.81 | 1270 | .915 | 0 | 0 | 0 | 2 |
| Jhonas Enroth | 12 | 9 | 623:26 | 4 | 4 | 1 | 27 | 2.60 | 332 | .919 | 1 | 0 | 0 | 0 |
| Totals | | 48 | 2925:40 | 21 | 21 | 6 | 135 | 2.77 | 1602 | .916 | 1 | 0 | 0 | 2 |

^{†}Denotes player spent time with another team before joining the Sabres. Stats reflect time with the Sabres only.
^{‡}Traded mid-season
Bold/italics denotes franchise record

== Awards and records ==
=== Awards ===
Regular season
| Player | Award | Awarded |
|---|---|---|
| Thomas Vanek | NHL Third Star of the Month | February 1, 2013 |
| Thomas Vanek | NHL First Star of the Week | February 4, 2013 |

=== Milestones ===
Regular season
| Player | Milestone | Reached |
|---|---|---|
| Mikhail Grigorenko | 1st Career NHL Game | January 20, 2013 |
| Drew Stafford | 400th Career NHL Game | January 24, 2013 |
| Mikhail Grigorenko | 1st Career NHL Goal; 1st Career NHL Point | January 29, 2013 |
| Mikhail Grigorenko | 1st Career NHL Assist | January 31, 2013 |
| Cody Hodgson | 100th Career NHL Game | February 3, 2013 |
| Tyler Ennis | 100th Career NHL Point | February 7, 2013 |
| Alexander Sulzer | 100th Career NHL Game | February 9, 2013 |
| Jordan Leopold | 600th Career NHL Game | February 12, 2013 |
| Jochen Hecht | 800th Career NHL Game | February 12, 2013 |
| Brian Flynn | 1st Career NHL Game | March 2, 2013 |
| Brian Flynn | 1st Career NHL Goal; 1st Career NHL Point | March 7, 2013 |
| Brian Flynn | 1st Career NHL Assist | March 12, 2013 |
| Mark Pysyk | 1st Career NHL Game | March 17, 2013 |
| Jordan Leopold | 200th Career NHL Point | March 19, 2013 |
| Ville Leino | 100th Career NHL Point | March 19, 2013 |
| Steve Ott | 600th Career NHL Game | March 28, 2013 |
| Christian Ehrhoff | 600th Career NHL Game | March 30, 2013 |
| Mark Pysyk | 1st Career NHL Assist; 1st Career NHL Point | April 2, 2013 |
| Ryan Miller | 492nd Career NHL Game (Sabres Goalie Franchise Record) | April 2, 2013 |
| Ryan Miller | Sabres Career Saves Record | April 5, 2013 |
| Chad Ruhwedel | 1st Career NHL Game | April 13, 2013 |
| Patrick Kaleta | 300th Career NHL Game | April 17, 2013 |
| Mark Pysyk | 1st Career NHL Goal | April 19, 2013 |
| Ryan Miller | 500th Career NHL Game | April 26, 2013 |

== Transactions ==
The Sabres have been involved in the following transactions during the 2012–13 season:

=== Trades ===
| Date | Details |
|---|---|---|
| June 22, 2012 | To Calgary Flames 1st-round pick (21st overall) in 2012; 2nd-round pick (42nd overall) in 2012 | To Buffalo Sabres 1st-round pick (14th overall) in 2012 |
| July 2, 2012 | To Dallas Stars Derek Roy | To Buffalo Sabres Steve Ott; Adam Pardy |
| March 15, 2013 | To Florida Panthers T. J. Brennan | To Buffalo Sabres 5th-round pick in 2013 |
| March 30, 2013 | To St. Louis Blues Jordan Leopold | To Buffalo Sabres 2nd-round pick in 2013; Conditional 5th-round pick in 2013 (Note: Condition satisfied.) |
| April 1, 2013 | To Los Angeles Kings Robyn Regehr | To Buffalo Sabres 2nd-round pick in 2014; 2nd-round pick in 2015 |
| April 3, 2013 | To Minnesota Wild Jason Pominville; 4th-round pick in 2014 | To Buffalo Sabres Matt Hackett; Johan Larsson; 1st-round pick in 2013; 2nd-round pick in 2014 |

=== Free agents signed ===
| Player | Former team | Contract terms |
| John Scott | New York Rangers | 1 year, $600,000 |
| Kevin Porter | Colorado Avalanche | 2 years, $1.075 million |
| Mark Mancari | Vancouver Canucks | 1 year, $550,000 |
| Nick Tarnasky | Vityaz Chekhov | 1 year, $525,000 |
| Tim Schaller | Providence College | 2 years, entry-level contract |
| Chad Ruhwedel | University of Massachusetts Lowell | 2 years, $1.85 million entry-level contract |

=== Free agents lost ===
| Player | New team | Contract terms |
| Paul Szczechura | Lev Praha | 1 year, undisclosed |
| Shaone Morrisonn | Spartak Moscow | Undisclosed |
| Dennis Persson | Brynas IF | Undisclosed |
| Brad Boyes | New York Islanders | 1 year, $1 million |
| Michael Ryan | Assat | 1 year, Undisclosed |

=== Claimed via waivers ===
| Player | Former team | Date claimed off waivers |

=== Lost via waivers ===
| Player | New team | Date claimed off waivers |
|---|---|---|
| Joe Finley | New York Islanders | January 14, 2013 |

=== Lost via retirement ===
Player

=== Player signings ===
| Player | Date | Contract terms |
| Nathan Lieuwen | May 5, 2012 | 3 years, $1.715 million entry-level contract |
| Alexander Sulzer | May 21, 2012 | 1 year, $725,000 contract extension |
| Joel Armia | June 16, 2012 | 3 years, $3.825 million entry-level contract |
| David Leggio | July 6, 2012 | 1 year, $550,000 |
| Zemgus Girgensons | July 13, 2012 | 3 years, $2.775 million entry-level contract |
| T. J. Brennan | July 17, 2012 | 1 year, $550,000 |
| Mikhail Grigorenko | July 18, 2012 | 3 years, $2.775 million entry-level contract |
| Drew Schiestel | July 25, 2012 | 1 year, $577,500 |
| Patrick Kaleta | July 31, 2012 | 3 years, $3.75 million |
| Alex Biega | August 2, 2012 | 1 year, $577,500 |
| Tyler Ennis | September 15, 2012 | 2 years, $5.625 million |
| Jochen Hecht | January 13, 2013 | 1 year, $1 million |
| John Scott | May 20, 2013 | 1 year, $750,000 contract extension |
| Colin Jacobs | May 30, 2013 | 3 years, $1.775 million entry-level contract |
| Jhonas Enroth | June 20, 2013 | 2 years, 2.5 million |
| Mike Weber | June 27, 2013 | 3 years, $5 million contract extension |

== Draft picks ==
Buffalo Sabres' picks at the 2012 NHL entry draft, held in Pittsburgh, Pennsylvania on June 22 & 23, 2012.

| Round | # | Player | Pos | Nationality | College/Junior/Club team (League) |
|---|---|---|---|---|---|
| 1 | 12 | Mikhail Grigorenko | C | Russia | Quebec Remparts (QMJHL) |
| 1 | 14^{[a]} | Zemgus Girgensons | C | Latvia | Dubuque Fighting Saints (USHL) |
| 2 | 44^{[b]} | Jake McCabe | D | United States | University of Wisconsin (WCHA) |
| 3 | 73 | Justin Kea | C | Canada | Saginaw Spirit (OHL) |
| 5 | 133 | Logan Nelson | C | United States | Victoria Royals (WHL) |
| 6 | 163 | Linus Ullmark | G | Sweden | Modo Hockey Jr. (J20 SuperElit) |
| 7 | 193 | Brady Austin | D | Canada | Belleville Bulls (OHL) |
| 7 | 204^{[c]} | Judd Peterson | C/RW | United States | The Marshall School (USHS-MN) |

Draft notes

- ^{a} The Calgary Flames's first-round pick went to the Buffalo Sabres as a result of a June 22, 2012, trade that sent a 2012 first-round pick and a 2012 second-round pick to the Flames in exchange for this pick.
- The Buffalo Sabres' second-round pick went to the Calgary Flames as a result of a June 22, 2012, trade that sent a 2012 first-round pick to the Sabres in exchange for a 2012 first-round pick this pick.
- ^{b} The Calgary Flames' second-round pick went to the Buffalo Sabres as a result of a June 25, 2011, trade that sent Chris Butler and Paul Byron to the Flames in exchange for Robyn Regehr, Ales Kotalik and this pick.
- The Buffalo Sabres' fourth-round pick went to the New York Islanders as the result of a June 29, 2011, trade that sent Christian Ehrhoff to the Sabres in exchange for this pick.
- ^{c} The Chicago Blackhawks' seventh-round pick went to the Buffalo Sabres as a result of a June 29, 2011, trade that sent Steve Montador to the Blackhawks in exchange for this pick.

== See also ==
- 2012–13 NHL season
