= 2012–13 Florida Panthers season =

National Hockey League team season

2012–13 Florida Panthers
- Division: 5th Southeast
- Conference: 15th Eastern
- 2012–13 record: 15–27–6
- Home record: 8–11–5
- Road record: 7–16–1
- Goals for: 112
- Goals against: 171

Team information
- General manager: Dale Tallon
- Coach: Kevin Dineen
- Captain: Ed Jovanovski
- Alternate captains: Brian Campbell; Stephen Weiss
- Arena: BB&T Center
- Average attendance: 16,991 (99.7%) (23 games)

Team leaders
- Goals: Tomáš Kopecký (15)
- Assists: Tomáš Fleischmann (23)
- Points: Tomas Fleischmann (35)
- Penalty minutes: George Parros (57)
- Plus/minus: Jonathan Rheault and Eric Selleck (0)
- Wins: Jacob Markstrom (8)
- Goals against average: Jacob Markstrom (3.23)

The 2012–13 Florida Panthers season was the 19th season for the National Hockey League (NHL) franchise that was established on June 14, 1993. The season was partially cancelled due to a lockout, which ended on January 6, 2013. The campaign for the Panthers then commenced as a shortened, 48-game season beginning on January 19. The shortened season would feature only intra-conference games.

The Panthers were eliminated from Stanley Cup playoff contention, failing to make the playoffs for the 11th time in their past 12 seasons and for the first time since the 2010–11 season. Florida earned the fewest points of any NHL team in 2012–13, finishing with a 15–27–6 record for last in both the Eastern Conference and 30-team NHL.

== Pre-season ==
A pre-season schedule was planned for late September and early October, but the lockout forced its cancellation. No pre-season will be held for the truncated, 48-game campaign beginning January 19.

== Regular season ==
As of Thursday, October 4, the NHL has cancelled all games scheduled through Wednesday, October 24, causing the Panthers to lose their first five games of the season, with more cancelled games possible without a resolution to the dispute soon. As of Friday, October 19, the Panthers have lost three additional games through November 1 due to the lockout. All November games were lost one week later on Friday, October 26, eliminating any possibility of a rearranged 82-game season and assuring that any season that does take place will be shortened. On November 23, two more weeks of hockey and six additional Panthers games were put on the chopping block, with all matchups through December 14 being cancelled. On December 11, after a week of negotiations broke off, all games through December 30 were axed. On December 20, 2012, following a further lack of negotiations during the lockout, all games through January 14 were cancelled.

On January 6, 2013, the lockout ended after a 16-hour negotiation session in an effort to salvage the season. A condensed season, of a length of 48 intra-conference games, will now be played.

The Panthers scored 109 goals (excluding three shootout-winning goals) over the lockout-shortened season of 48 games, tied for 29th overall with the Nashville Predators. They also allowed 170 goals (excluding one shootout goal), the most in the League, allowed the most power-play goals, with 39, and had the lowest penalty-kill percentage, at 74.17%.

== Standings ==
Southeast Division
Pos	Team	GP	W	L	OTL	ROW	GF	GA	GD	Pts
1	y – Washington Capitals	48	27	18	3	24	149	126	+23	57
2	Winnipeg Jets	48	24	21	3	22	128	109	+19	51
3	Carolina Hurricanes	48	19	25	4	18	128	133	−5	42
4	Tampa Bay Lightning	48	18	26	4	17	148	104	+44	40
5	Florida Panthers	48	15	27	6	12	112	143	−31	36

Source: National Hockey League
y – Clinched division

Eastern Conference
Pos	Div	Team	GP	W	L	OTL	ROW	GF	GA	GD	Pts
1	AT	z – Pittsburgh Penguins	48	36	12	0	33	165	119	+46	72
2	NE	y – Montreal Canadiens	48	29	14	5	26	149	126	+23	63
3	SE	y – Washington Capitals	48	27	18	3	24	149	130	+19	57
4	NE	x – Boston Bruins	48	28	14	6	24	131	109	+22	62
5	NE	x – Toronto Maple Leafs	48	26	17	5	26	145	133	+12	57
6	AT	x – New York Rangers	48	26	18	4	22	130	112	+18	56
7	NE	x – Ottawa Senators	48	25	17	6	21	116	104	+12	56
8	AT	x – New York Islanders	48	24	17	7	20	139	139	0	55
9	SE	Winnipeg Jets	48	24	21	3	22	128	144	−16	51
10	AT	Philadelphia Flyers	48	23	22	3	22	133	141	−8	49
11	AT	New Jersey Devils	48	19	19	10	17	112	129	−17	48
12	NE	Buffalo Sabres	48	21	21	6	14	115	143	−28	48
13	SE	Carolina Hurricanes	48	19	25	4	18	128	160	−32	42
14	SE	Tampa Bay Lightning	48	18	26	4	17	148	150	−2	40
15	SE	Florida Panthers	48	15	27	6	12	112	171	−59	36

Source: National Hockey League
x – Clinched playoff spot; y – Clinched division; z – Clinched conference

== Schedule and results ==
Below is the new, truncated 2012–13 schedule for the Panthers, who will open the season on Saturday, January 19 against the Hurricanes, closing on Saturday, April 27 against the Tampa Bay Lightning.

2012–13 Game Log
January: 2–5–0 (Home: 2–2–0; Road: 0–3–0)

#	Date	Visitor	Score	Home	OT	Win	Loss	Attendance	Record	Pts	Recap
1	January 19	Carolina	1–5	Florida		**Theodore** (1–0–0)	Ward (0–1–0)	19,688	1–0–0	2	Recap
2	January 21	Florida	0–4	Ottawa		Anderson (2–0–0)	**Theodore** (1–1–0)	19,952	1–1–0	2	Recap
3	January 22	Florida	1–4	Montreal		Price (1–1–0)	**Clemmensen** (0–1–0)	21,273	1–2–0	2	Recap
4	January 24	Ottawa	3–1	Florida		Anderson (3–0–0)	**Theodore** (1–2–0)	15,634	1–3–0	2	Recap
5	January 26	Philadelphia	7–1	Florida		Bryzgalov (2–3–0)	**Theodore** (1–3–0)	19,311	1–4–0	2	Recap
6	January 29	Florida	2–5	Tampa Bay		Lindback (4–1–0)	**Theodore** (1–4–0)	19,204	1–5–0	2	Recap
7	January 31	Winnipeg	3–6	Florida		**Theodore** (2–4–0)	Pavelec (2–3–1)	15,731	2–5–0	4	Recap

February: 4–4–5 (Home: 1–2–4; Road: 3–2–1)

#	Date	Visitor	Score	Home	OT	Win	Loss	Attendance	Record	Pts	Recap
8	February 3	Florida	4–3	Buffalo		**Theodore** (3–4–0)	Miller (3–4–1)	18,831	3–5–0	6	Recap
9	February 5	Florida	2–3	Winnipeg	OT	Pavelec (3–4–1)	**Clemmensen** (0–1–1)	15,004	3–5–1	7	Recap
10	February 7	Florida	3–2	Philadelphia	SO	**Theodore** (4–4–0)	Bryzgalov (4–5–1)	19,616	4–5–1	9	Recap
11	February 9	Florida	0–5	Washington		Holtby (2–4–0)	**Theodore** (4–5–0)	18,506	4–6–1	9	Recap
12	February 12	Washington	6–5	Florida	OT	Holtby (3–4–0)	**Clemmensen** (0–1–2)	15,340	4–6–2	10	Recap
13	February 14	Montreal	1–0	Florida	OT	Price (8–3–0)	**Theodore** (4–5–1)	17,021	4–6–3	11	Recap
14	February 16	Tampa Bay	6–5	Florida	OT	Lindback (6–3–1)	**Theodore** (4–5–2)	17,009	4–6–4	12	Recap
15	February 18	Toronto	3–0	Florida		Scrivens (4–3–0)	**Theodore** (4–6–2)	17,177	4–7–4	12	Recap
16	February 21	Florida	5–2	Philadelphia		**Clemmensen** (1–1–2)	Bryzgalov (8–8–1)	19,605	5–7–4	14	Recap
17	February 22	Florida	1–3	Pittsburgh		Fleury (9–3–0)	**Markstrom** (0–1–0)	18,655	5–8–4	14	Recap
18	February 24	Boston	4–1	Florida		Rask (9–1–2)	**Markstrom** (0–2–0)	18,108	5–9–4	14	Recap
19	February 26	Pittsburgh	4–6	Florida		**Clemmensen** (2–1–2)	Fleury (10–4–0)	17,378	6–9–4	16	Recap
20	February 28	Buffalo	4–3	Florida	SO	Miller (8–10–1)	**Theodore** (4–6–3)	15,672	6–9–5	17	Recap

March: 5–10–1 (Home: 3–4–1; Road: 2–6–0)

#	Date	Visitor	Score	Home	OT	Win	Loss	Attendance	Record	Pts	Recap
21	March 2	Florida	2–6	Carolina		Ward (8–6–1)	**Clemmensen** (2–2–2)	18,680	6–10–5	17	Recap
22	March 3	Carolina	3–2	Florida		Ward (9–6–1)	**Clemmensen** (2–3–2)	15,978	6–11–5	17	Recap
23	March 5	Winnipeg	1–4	Florida		**Markstrom** (1–2–0)	Pavelec (8–11–1)	14,574	7–11–5	19	Recap
24	March 7	Florida	1–7	Washington		Holtby (9–7–0)	**Markstrom** (1–3–0)	18,506	7–12–5	19	Recap
25	March 8	Winnipeg	3–2	Florida	OT	Pavelec (9–11–1)	**Markstrom** (1–3–1)	16,442	7–12–6	20	Recap
26	March 10	Montreal	5–2	Florida		Budaj (4–1–1)	**Markstrom** (1–4–1)	19,189	7–13–6	20	Recap
27	March 12	Tampa Bay	3–2	Florida		Lindback (9–6–1)	**Markstrom** (1–5–1)	15,174	7–14–6	20	Recap
28	March 14	Florida	1–4	Boston		Rask (14–2–3)	**Clemmensen** (2–4–2)	17,565	7–15–6	20	Recap
29	March 16	N.Y. Islanders	4–3	Florida		Nabokov (13–8–3)	**Clemmensen** (2–5–2)	17,627	7–16–6	20	Recap
30	March 19	Florida	4–1	Carolina		**Markstrom** (2–5–1)	Ellis (4–4–1)	16,349	8–16–6	22	Recap
31	March 21	Florida	3–1	N.Y. Rangers		**Markstrom** (3–5–1)	Lundqvist (13–12–1)	17,200	9–16–6	24	Recap
32	March 23	Florida	1–2	New Jersey		Brodeur (10–2–3)	**Clemmensen** (2–6–2)	17,625	9–17–6	24	Recap
33	March 24	Florida	0–3	N.Y. Islanders		Nabokov (14–10–3)	**Markstrom** (3–6–1)	14,512	9–18–6	24	Recap
34	March 26	Florida	2–3	Toronto		Scrivens (7–8–0)	**Markstrom** (3–7–1)	19,379	9–19–6	24	Recap
35	March 28	Buffalo	4–5	Florida	SO	**Markstrom** (4–7–1)	Miller (11–14–5)	17,044	10–19–6	26	Recap
36	March 30	New Jersey	2–3	Florida	OT	**Markstrom** (5–7–1)	Brodeur (10–2–6)	18,138	11–19–6	28	Recap

April: 4–8–0 (Home: 2–3–0; Road: 2–5–0)

#	Date	Visitor	Score	Home	OT	Win	Loss	Attendance	Record	Pts	Recap
37	April 2	Florida	3–2	Tampa Bay	SO	**Markstrom** (6–7–1)	Garon (5–8–1)	17,904	12–19–6	30	Recap
38	April 6	Washington	3–4	Florida		Holtby (17–11–1)	**Markstrom** (6–8–1)	16,886	12–20–6	30	Recap
39	April 7	Ottawa	1–2	Florida		**Clemmensen** (3–6–2)	Anderson (8–5–2)	15,552	13–20–6	32	Recap
40	April 11	Florida	2–7	Winnipeg		Pavelec (18–18–2)	**Markstrom** (6–9–1)	15,004	13–21–6	32	Recap
41	April 13	Pittsburgh	1–3	Florida		Fleury (21–6–0)	**Markstrom** (6–10–1)	18,891	13–22–6	32	Recap
42	April 16	Florida	2–5	N.Y. Islanders		Nabokov (21–11–5)	**Markstrom** (6–11–1)	15,922	13–23–6	32	Recap
43	April 18	Florida	1–6	N.Y. Rangers		Lundqvist (20–15–3)	**Clemmensen** (3–7–2)	17,200	13–24–6	32	Recap
44	April 20	Florida	2–6	New Jersey		Brodeur (12–8–7)	**Markstrom** (6–12–1)	16,018	13–25–6	32	Recap
45	April 21	Florida	0–3	Boston		Rask (18–9–4)	**Markstrom** (6–13–1)	17,565	13–26–6	32	Recap
46	April 23	N.Y. Rangers	2–3	Florida		**Markstrom** (7–13–1)	Lundqvist (22–16–3)	17,758	14–26–6	34	Recap
47	April 25	Toronto	4–0	Florida		Reimer (19–7–5)	**Markstrom** (7–14–1)	16,484	14–27–6	34	Recap
48	April 27	Florida	5–3	Tampa Bay		**Markstrom** (8–14–1)	Lindback (10–10–1)	19,204	15–27–6	36	Recap

**Legend**:

Win (2 points) Loss (0 points) Overtime/shootout loss (1 point)
**Boldface text** denotes a Panthers goalie.

== Player statistics ==
Final stats

Skaters

Regular season
Player	GP	G	A	Pts	+/-	PIM
Tomas Fleischmann	48	12	23	35	−10	16
Jonathan Huberdeau	48	14	17	31	−15	18
Brian Campbell	48	8	19	27	−22	12
Tomas Kopecky	47	15	12	27	−8	28
Shawn Matthias	48	14	7	21	−8	16
Marcel Goc	42	9	10	19	−6	8
Peter Mueller	43	8	9	17	−11	18
Drew Shore	43	3	10	13	−10	14
Jack Skille	40	3	9	12	−9	11
Filip Kuba	44	1	9	10	−18	24
Dmitri Kulikov	34	3	7	10	−5	22
Mike Weaver	27	1	8	9	−3	8
T. J. Brennan^{†}	19	2	7	9	−8	2
Alexei Kovalev	14	2	3	5	−1	6
Scottie Upshall	27	4	1	5	−8	25
Jerred Smithson^{‡}	35	2	3	5	−4	10
Stephen Weiss	17	1	3	4	−13	25
Tyson Strachan	38	0	4	4	−13	40
Kris Versteeg	10	2	2	4	−8	8
Erik Gudbranson	32	0	4	4	−22	47
Mike Santorelli^{‡}	24	2	1	3	−7	2
George Parros	39	1	1	2	−15	57
Ed Jovanovski	6	0	1	1	−4	0
Greg Rallo	10	1	0	1	−5	2
Eric Selleck	2	0	1	1	2	17
Colby Robak	16	0	1	1	−1	17
Nick Bjugstad	11	1	0	1	−8	2
Nolan Yonkman	7	0	0	0	−1	11
Michael Caruso	2	0	0	0	−1	0
Jon Rheault	5	0	0	0	0	0
Scott Timmins	5	0	0	0	−2	4
Alex Petrovic	6	0	0	0	−8	25
Quinton Howden	18	0	0	0	−11	2
Keaton Ellerby^{‡}	9	0	0	0	−2	36
Totals		109	172	281	−265	533

Goaltenders

Regular season
Player	GP	GS	TOI	W	L	OT	GA	GAA	SA	SV%	SO	G	A	PIM
Jacob Markstrom	23	23	1265:45	8	14	1	68	3.22	685	.901	0	0	0	0
Scott Clemmensen	19	11	866:25	3	7	2	53	3.67	421	.874	0	0	0	0
Jose Theodore	15	14	766:28	4	6	3	42	3.29	391	.893	0	0	0	2
Totals		48	2898:38	15	27	6	163	3.37	1497	.891	0	0	0	2

^{†}Denotes player spent time with another team before joining the Panthers. Stats reflect time with the Panthers only.
^{‡}Traded mid-season
Bold/italics denotes franchise record

== Awards and records ==
=== Awards ===
Regular Season
Player	Award	Awarded
Jonathan Huberdeau	Calder Memorial Trophy	June 15, 2013

== Transactions ==
The Panthers have been involved in the following transactions during the 2012–13 season.

=== Trades ===
Date	Details
June 23, 2012	To Dallas Stars 7th-round pick in 2013	To Florida Panthers 7th-round pick in 2012
July 20, 2012	To New York Rangers 5th-round pick in 2014	To Florida Panthers Casey Wellman
January 14, 2013	To Montreal Canadiens Jason DeSantis	To Florida Panthers Brendon Nash
January 21, 2013	To Tampa Bay Lightning Jean-Francois Jacques	To Florida Panthers Future considerations
January 31, 2013	To Washington Capitals Casey Wellman	To Florida Panthers Zach Hamill
February 8, 2013	To Los Angeles Kings Keaton Ellerby	To Florida Panthers 5th-round pick in 2013
March 15, 2013	To Buffalo Sabres 5th-round pick in 2013	To Florida Panthers T. J. Brennan
April 3, 2013	To Edmonton Oilers Jerred Smithson	To Florida Panthers 4th-round pick in 2013
June 14, 2013	To Nashville Predators T. J. Brennan	To Florida Panthers Bobby Butler
June 18, 2013	To Calgary Flames Corban Knight	To Florida Panthers 4th-round pick in 2013

=== Free agents acquired ===
Player	Former team	Contract terms
Jason DeSantis	St. John's IceCaps	1 year, $600,000
Dov Grumet-Morris	San Antonio Rampage	1 year, $550,000
Filip Kuba	Ottawa Senators	2 years, $8 million
George Parros	Anaheim Ducks	2 years, $1.85 million
Jon Rheault	Abbotsford Heat	1 year, $600,000
Jean-Francois Jacques	Anaheim Ducks	1 year, $750,000
Andre Deveaux	New York Rangers	1 year, $700,000
Michael Houser	London Knights	3 years, $1.755 million entry-level contract
Josh McFadden	Sudbury Wolves	3 years, $1.74 million entry-level contract
Peter Mueller	Colorado Avalanche	1 year, $1.725 million
Alexei Kovalev	Atlant Moscow Oblast	1 year, $1 million

=== Free agents lost ===
Player	New team	Contract terms
Mikael Samuelsson	Detroit Red Wings	2 years, $6 million
Jason Garrison	Vancouver Canucks	6 years, $27.6 million
Bracken Kearns	San Jose Sharks	1 year, $550,000
Krys Barch	New Jersey Devils	2 years, $1.5 million
Wojtek Wolski	Washington Capitals	1 year, $600,000
Jon Matsumoto	San Jose Sharks	1 year, $600,000
Bill Thomas	Colorado Avalanche	1 year, $550,000

=== Claimed via waivers ===
Player	Former team	Date claimed off waivers

=== Lost via waivers ===
Player	New team	Date claimed off waivers
James Wright	Winnipeg Jets	January 18, 2013
Mike Santorelli	Winnipeg Jets	April 3, 2013

=== Lost via retirement ===
Player
John Madden
Alexei Kovalev

=== Player signings ===
Player	Date	Contract terms
Scott Clemmensen	July 1, 2012	2 years, $2.4 million
Greg Rallo	July 1, 2012	1 year, $550,000
Keaton Ellerby	July 6, 2012	1 year, $700,000
Michael Caruso	July 17, 2012	1 year, $600,000
Brian Foster	July 17, 2012	1 year, $577,500
James Wright	July 17, 2012	2 years, $1.3 million
Kris Versteeg	July 23, 2012	4 years, $17.6 million
Eric Selleck	July 26, 2012	1 year, $550,000
Casey Wellman	July 26, 2012	1 year, $800,000
Dmitri Kulikov	January 18, 2012	2 years, $5 million
Nick Bjugstad	April 3, 2013	3 years, $2.7 million entry-level contract
Jonathan Racine	April 3, 2013	3 years, $1.995 million entry-level contract
Logan Shaw	April 22, 2013	3 years, $2.0225 million entry-level contract
Bobby Butler	June 24, 2013	2 years, $1.2 million
Eric Selleck	June 24, 2013	1 year, $600,000

== Draft picks ==
Florida Panthers' picks at the 2012 NHL entry draft, held in Pittsburgh, Pennsylvania on June 22 & 23, 2012.

Round	#	Player	Pos	Nationality	College/Junior/Club team (League)
1	23	Mike Matheson	D	Canada	Dubuque Fighting Saints (USHL)
3	84	Steven Hodges	C	Canada	Victoria Royals (WHL)
4	114	Alexander Delnov	LW	Russia	Mytischi Khimik (MHL)
6	174	Francois Bouvillier	C/LW	Canada	Rimouski Oceanic (QMJHL)
7	194^{[a]}	Jonatan Nielsen	D	Sweden	Linkopings HC Jr. (J20 SuperElit)

Draft Notes

- The Florida Panthers' second-round pick went to the Philadelphia Flyers as the result of a July 1, 2011, trade that sent Kris Versteeg to the Panthers in exchange for a 2012 third-round pick and this pick.
- The Florida Panthers' fifth-round pick went to the Dallas Stars as the result of a December 6, 2011, trade that sent Krys Barch and a 2012 sixth-round pick to the Panthers in exchange for Jake Hauswirth and this pick.
- ^{a} The Dallas Stars' seventh-round pick went to the Florida Panthers as a result of a June 23, 2012, trade that sent a 2013 seventh-round pick to the Stars in exchange for this pick.
- The Florida Panthers' seventh-round pick went to the Chicago Blackhawks as the result of a June 27, 2011, trade that sent Tomas Kopecky to the Predators in exchange for this conditional pick (2012 if Panthers do not send seventh-round pick to Predators from earlier trade, else 2013).

== See also ==
- 2012–13 NHL season
