= 2012–13 Washington Capitals season =

NHL hockey team season

2012–13 Washington Capitals
- Southeast Division champions
- Division: 1st Southeast
- Conference: 3rd Eastern
- 2012–13 record: 27–18–3
- Home record: 15–8–1
- Road record: 12–10–2
- Goals for: 149
- Goals against: 130

Team information
- General manager: George McPhee
- Coach: Adam Oates
- Captain: Alexander Ovechkin
- Alternate captains: Nicklas Backstrom; Mike Green; Brooks Laich
- Arena: Verizon Center
- Average attendance: 17,734 (95.8%) (24 games)

Team leaders
- Goals: Alexander Ovechkin (32)
- Assists: Nicklas Backstrom (48)
- Points: Alexander Ovechkin (53)
- Penalty minutes: Matt Hendricks (71)
- Plus/minus: Eric Fehr (+14)
- Wins: Braden Holtby (22)
- Goals against average: Braden Holtby (2.59)

The 2012–13 Washington Capitals season was the franchise's 39th season in the National Hockey League (NHL). The regular season was reduced from its usual 82 games to 48 due to a lockout.

== Off-season ==
On June 26, 2012, the Capitals announced the hiring of Adam Oates as their new head coach.

== Regular season ==
The Capitals scored the most power-play goals in the NHL during the regular season with 47. They also had the best power-play percentage at 27.65% (47 for 170).

== Schedule and results ==
2012–13 Schedule
January: 1–5–1 (Home: 1–2–0; Road: 0–3–1)

#	Date	Visitor	Score	Home	OT/SO	Decision	Record	Points	Attendance	Recap
1	19	Washington Capitals	3–6	Tampa Bay Lightning	–	Holtby	0–1–0	0	19,204	Recap
2	22	Winnipeg Jets	4–2	Washington Capitals	–	Holtby	0–2–0	0	18,506	Recap
3	24	Montreal Canadiens	4–1	Washington Capitals	–	Neuvirth	0–3–0	0	18,506	Recap
4	25	Washington Capitals	2–3	New Jersey Devils	OT	Neuvirth	0–3–1	1	17,625	Recap
5	27	Buffalo Sabres	2–3	Washington Capitals	–	Neuvirth	1–3–1	3	18,506	Recap
6	29	Washington Capitals	2–3	Ottawa Senators	–	Neuvirth	1–4–1	3	19,267	Recap
7	31	Washington Capitals	2–3	Toronto Maple Leafs	–	Neuvirth	1–5–1	3	19,374	Recap

February: 6–6–0 (Home: 4–3–0; Road: 2–3–0)

#	Date	Visitor	Score	Home	OT/SO	Decision	Record	Points	Attendance	Recap
8	1	Philadelphia Flyers	2–3	Washington Capitals	–	Holtby	2–5–1	5	18,506	Recap
9	3	Pittsburgh Penguins	6–3	Washington Capitals	–	Holtby	2–6–1	5	18,506	Recap
10	5	Toronto Maple Leafs	3–2	Washington Capitals	–	Neuvirth	2–7–1	5	18,506	Recap
11	7	Washington Capitals	2–5	Pittsburgh Penguins	–	Holtby	2–8–1	5	18,650	Recap
12	9	Florida Panthers	0–5	Washington Capitals	–	Holtby	3–8–1	7	18,506	Recap
13	12	Washington Capitals	6–5	Florida Panthers	OT	Holtby	4–8–1	9	15,340	Recap
14	14	Washington Capitals	4–3	Tampa Bay Lightning	–	Holtby	5–8–1	11	19,204	Recap
15	17	Washington Capitals	1–2	New York Rangers	–	Holtby	5–9–1	11	17,200	Recap
16	21	New Jersey Devils	3–2	Washington Capitals	–	Holtby	5–10–1	11	18,506	Recap
17	23	New Jersey Devils	1–5	Washington Capitals	–	Holtby	6–10–1	13	18,506	Recap
18	26	Carolina Hurricanes	0–3	Washington Capitals	–	Holtby	7–10–1	15	18,506	Recap
19	27	Washington Capitals	1–4	Philadelphia Flyers	–	Holtby	7–11–1	15	19,904	Recap

March: 9–6–1 (Home: 3–3–0; Road: 6–3–1)

#	Date	Visitor	Score	Home	OT/SO	Decision	Record	Points	Attendance	Recap
20	2	Washington Capitals	3–0	Winnipeg Jets	–	Holtby	8–11–1	17	15,004	Recap
21	5	Boston Bruins	3–4	Washington Capitals	OT	Holtby	9–11–1	19	18,506	Recap
22	7	Florida Panthers	1–7	Washington Capitals	–	Holtby	10–11–1	21	18,506	Recap
23	9	Washington Capitals	2–5	New York Islanders	–	Grubauer	10–12–1	21	14,819	Recap
24	10	New York Rangers	4–1	Washington Capitals	–	Holtby	10–13–1	21	18,506	Recap
25	12	Carolina Hurricanes	4–0	Washington Capitals	–	Holtby	10–14–1	21	18,506	Recap
26	14	Washington Capitals	3–2	Carolina Hurricanes	–	Neuvirth	11–14–1	23	16,810	Recap
27	16	Washington Capitals	1–4	Boston Bruins	–	Neuvirth	11–15–1	23	17,565	Recap
28	17	Buffalo Sabres	3–5	Washington Capitals	–	Holtby	12–15–1	25	18,506	Recap
29	19	Washington Capitals	1–2	Pittsburgh Penguins	–	Holtby	12–16–1	25	18653	Recap
30	21	Washington Capitals	4–0	Winnipeg Jets	–	Holtby	13–16–1	27	15,004	Recap
31	22	Washington Capitals	6–1	Winnipeg Jets	–	Holtby	14–16–1	29	15,004	Recap
32	24	Washington Capitals	3–2	New York Rangers	SO	Holtby	15–16–1	31	17,200	Recap
33	26	New York Islanders	3–2	Washington Capitals	–	Holtby	15–17–1	31	18,506	Recap
34	30	Washington Capitals	4–3	Buffalo Sabres	SO	Holtby	16–17–1	33	19,070	Recap
35	31	Washington Capitals	4–5	Philadelphia Flyers	OT	Holtby	16–17–2	34	19,681	Recap

April: 11–1–1 (Home: 7–0–1; Road: 4–1–0)

#	Date	Visitor	Score	Home	OT/SO	Decision	Record	Points	Attendance	Recap
36	2	Washington Capitals	5–3	Carolina Hurricanes	–	Holtby	17–17–2	36	16,530	Recap
37	4	New York Islanders	1–2	Washington Capitals	SO	Holtby	18–17–2	38	18,506	Recap
38	6	Washington Capitals	4–3	Florida Panthers	–	Holtby	19–17–2	40	16,886	Recap
39	7	Tampa Bay Lightning	2–4	Washington Capitals	–	Neuvirth	20–17–2	42	18,506	Recap
40	9	Washington Capitals	3–2	Montreal Canadiens	–	Neuvirth	21–17–2	44	21,273	Recap
41	11	Carolina Hurricanes	1–3	Washington Capitals	–	Holtby	22–17–2	46	18,506	Recap
42	13	Tampa Bay Lightning	5–6	Washington Capitals	OT	Holtby	23–17–2	48	18,506	Recap
43	16	Toronto Maple Leafs	1–5	Washington Capitals	–	Holtby	24–17–2	50	18,506	Recap
44	18	Washington Capitals	1–3	Ottawa Senators	–	Holtby	24–18–2	50	19,965	Recap
45	20	Washington Capitals	5–1	Montreal Canadiens	–	Holtby	25–18–2	52	21,273	Recap
46	23	Winnipeg Jets	5–3	Washington Capitals	–	Holtby	26–18–2	54	18,506	Recap
47	25	Ottawa Senators	2–1	Washington Capitals	OT	Neuvirth	26–18–3	55	18,506	Recap
48	27	Boston Bruins	2–3	Washington Capitals	OT	Holtby	27–18–3	57	18,506	Recap

Legend: = Win = Loss = OT/SO Loss

=== Season standings ===
Southeast Division
Pos	Team	GP	W	L	OTL	ROW	GF	GA	GD	Pts
1	y – Washington Capitals	48	27	18	3	24	149	126	+23	57
2	Winnipeg Jets	48	24	21	3	22	128	109	+19	51
3	Carolina Hurricanes	48	19	25	4	18	128	133	−5	42
4	Tampa Bay Lightning	48	18	26	4	17	148	104	+44	40
5	Florida Panthers	48	15	27	6	12	112	143	−31	36

Source: National Hockey League
y – Clinched division

Eastern Conference
Pos	Div	Team	GP	W	L	OTL	ROW	GF	GA	GD	Pts
1	AT	z – Pittsburgh Penguins	48	36	12	0	33	165	119	+46	72
2	NE	y – Montreal Canadiens	48	29	14	5	26	149	126	+23	63
3	SE	y – Washington Capitals	48	27	18	3	24	149	130	+19	57
4	NE	x – Boston Bruins	48	28	14	6	24	131	109	+22	62
5	NE	x – Toronto Maple Leafs	48	26	17	5	26	145	133	+12	57
6	AT	x – New York Rangers	48	26	18	4	22	130	112	+18	56
7	NE	x – Ottawa Senators	48	25	17	6	21	116	104	+12	56
8	AT	x – New York Islanders	48	24	17	7	20	139	139	0	55
9	SE	Winnipeg Jets	48	24	21	3	22	128	144	−16	51
10	AT	Philadelphia Flyers	48	23	22	3	22	133	141	−8	49
11	AT	New Jersey Devils	48	19	19	10	17	112	129	−17	48
12	NE	Buffalo Sabres	48	21	21	6	14	115	143	−28	48
13	SE	Carolina Hurricanes	48	19	25	4	18	128	160	−32	42
14	SE	Tampa Bay Lightning	48	18	26	4	17	148	150	−2	40
15	SE	Florida Panthers	48	15	27	6	12	112	171	−59	36

Source: National Hockey League
x – Clinched playoff spot; y – Clinched division; z – Clinched conference

== Playoffs ==
The Washington Capitals ended the 2012–13 regular season as the Southeast Division champions and therefore as the Eastern Conference's 3rd seed. They faced the #6 seed New York Rangers in the first round, losing 4 games to 3.

Key: Win Loss

2013 Stanley Cup playoffs
Eastern Conference Quarterfinals vs. (6) New York Rangers: Rangers win series 4–3

#	Date	Visitor	Score	Home	OT	Decision	Series	Attendance	Recap
1	May 2	New York Rangers	1–3	Washington Capitals	–	Holtby	Capitals lead 1–0	18,506	Recap
2	May 4	New York Rangers	0–1	Washington Capitals	OT	Holtby	Capitals lead 2–0	18,506	Recap
3	May 6	Washington Capitals	3–4	New York Rangers	–	Holtby	Capitals lead 2–1	17,200	Recap
4	May 8	Washington Capitals	3–4	New York Rangers	–	Holtby	Series ties 2–2	17,200	Recap
5	May 10	New York Rangers	1–2	Washington Capitals	OT	Holtby	Capitals lead 3–2	18,506	Recap
6	May 12	Washington Capitals	0–1	New York Rangers	–	Holtby	Series tied 3–3	17,200	Recap
7	May 13	New York Rangers	5–0	Washington Capitals	–	Holtby	Rangers win 4–3	18,506	Recap

== Player statistics ==
Final stats

Skaters

Regular season
Player	GP	G	A	Pts	+/-	PIM
Alexander Ovechkin	48	32	24	56	2	36
Mike Ribeiro	48	13	36	49	−4	53
Nicklas Backstrom	48	8	40	48	8	20
Troy Brouwer	47	19	14	33	−5	28
Mike Green	35	12	14	26	−3	20
John Carlson	48	6	16	22	11	18
Marcus Johansson	34	6	16	22	3	4
Joel Ward	39	8	12	20	7	12
Eric Fehr	41	9	8	17	14	10
Mathieu Perreault	39	6	11	17	7	20
Jason Chimera	47	3	11	14	−5	48
Wojtek Wolski	27	4	5	9	1	6
Jack Hillen	23	3	6	9	9	14
Steven Oleksy	28	1	8	9	9	33
Matt Hendricks	48	5	3	8	−6	73
Jay Beagle	48	2	6	8	−1	14
Tomas Kundratek	25	1	6	7	−5	8
John Erskine	30	3	3	6	10	34
Karl Alzner	48	1	4	5	−6	14
Brooks Laich	9	1	3	4	2	6
Martin Erat^{†}	9	1	2	3	0	4
Jeff Schultz	26	0	3	3	−6	12
Tom Poti	16	0	2	2	−2	2
Joey Crabb	26	2	0	2	−1	8
Dmitry Orlov	5	0	1	1	5	0
Aaron Volpatti^{†}	17	0	1	1	−2	7
Roman Hamrlik^{‡}	4	0	1	1	−1	2
Cameron Schilling	1	0	0	0	−1	0

Playoffs
Player	GP	G	A	Pts	+/-	PIM
Joel Ward	7	1	3	4	−1	6
Mike Green	7	2	2	4	0	4
Mathieu Perreault	7	1	3	4	3	0
Jason Chimera	7	1	2	3	1	4
Nicklas Backstrom	7	1	2	3	−2	0
Mike Ribeiro	7	1	1	2	−2	10
Alexander Ovechkin	7	1	1	2	−2	4
Troy Brouwer	7	1	1	2	0	10
Karl Alzner	7	1	1	2	3	2
Marcus Johansson	7	1	1	2	−3	0
John Erskine	7	0	1	1	−4	4
Jay Beagle	7	1	0	1	−5	4
Jack Hillen	7	0	1	1	−4	6
John Carlson	7	0	1	1	−4	4
Steven Oleksy	7	0	1	1	−1	4
Martin Erat	4	0	0	0	1	4
Matt Hendricks	7	0	0	0	−2	0
Eric Fehr	7	0	0	0	−2	6
Tom Wilson	3	0	0	0	−1	0

Goaltenders

Regular season
Player	GP	GS	TOI	W	L	OT	GA	GAA	SA	SV%	SO	G	A	PIM
Braden Holtby	36	35	2089:14	23	12	1	90	2.58	1123	.920	4	0	2	2
Michal Neuvirth	13	12	723:08	4	5	2	33	2.74	367	.910	0	0	0	0
Philipp Grubauer	2	1	83:58	0	1	0	5	3.57	59	.915	0	0	0	0
Totals		48	2896:20	27	18	3	128	2.65	1549	.917	4	0	2	2

Playoffs
Player	GP	GS	TOI	W	L	GA	GAA	SA	SV%	SO	G	A	PIM
Braden Holtby	7	7	432:50	3	4	16	2.22	205	.922	1	0	0	2

^{†}Denotes player spent time with another team before joining the Capitals. Stats reflect time with the Capitals only.
^{‡}Traded mid-season
Bold/italics denotes franchise record

== Awards and records ==
=== Awards ===
Regular Season
Player	Award	Awarded
Alexander Ovechkin	Maurice "Rocket" Richard Trophy	April 2013
Alexander Ovechkin	Hart Memorial Trophy	June 15, 2013

== Transactions ==
The Capitals have been involved in the following transactions during the 2012–13 season.

=== Trades ===
Date	Details
June 22, 2012	To Dallas Stars: Cody Eakin; 2nd-round pick in 2012	To Washington Capitals: Mike Ribeiro
June 27, 2012	To Calgary Flames: Dennis Wideman	To Washington Capitals: Jordan Henry; 5th-round pick in 2013
January 31, 2013	To Florida Panthers: Zach Hamill	To Washington Capitals: Casey Wellman
January 31, 2013	To Chicago Blackhawks: Mathieu Beaudoin	To Washington Capitals: Peter LeBlanc
March 14, 2013	To Minnesota Wild: Conditional 7th-round pick in 2014 (Note: Condition not satisfied.)	To Washington Capitals: Chay Genoway
March 14, 2013	To Toronto Maple Leafs: Kevin Marshall	To Washington Capitals: Nicolas Deschamps
April 2, 2013	To Phoenix Coyotes: Matt Clackson	To Washington Capitals: Joel Rechlicz
April 2, 2013	To Edmonton Oilers: Garrett Stafford	To Washington Capitals: Dane Byers
April 3, 2013	To Nashville Predators: Filip Forsberg	To Washington Capitals: Martin Erat; Michael Latta

=== Free agents signed ===
Player	Former team	Contract terms
Joey Crabb	Toronto Maple Leafs	1 year, $950,000
Garrett Stafford	Hamilton Bulldogs	1 year, $550,000
Jack Hillen	Nashville Predators	1 year, $650,000
Ryan Stoa	Lake Erie Monsters	1 year, $700,000
Wojtek Wolski	Florida Panthers	1 year, $600,000
Matt Clackson	Chicago Wolves	1 year, $525,000
Eric Fehr	Winnipeg Jets	1 year, $600,000
Steven Oleksy	Hershey Bears	3 years, $1.625 million entry-level contract
Nate Schmidt	University of Minnesota	2 years, $1.85 million entry-level contract

=== Free agents lost ===
Player	New team	Contract terms
Sean Collins	New York Rangers	1 year, $600,000
Jeff Halpern	New York Rangers	1 year, $700,000
Joel Rechlicz	Phoenix Coyotes	1 year, $550,000
Alexander Semin	Carolina Hurricanes	1 year, $7 million
Keith Aucoin	Toronto Maple Leafs	1 year, $650,000
Mike Knuble	Philadelphia Flyers	1 year, $750,000

=== Claimed via waivers ===
Player	Former team	Date claimed off waivers
Aaron Volpatti	Vancouver Canucks	February 28, 2013

=== Lost via waivers ===
Player	New team	Date claimed off waivers
Roman Hamrlik	New York Rangers	March 6, 2013

=== Player signings ===
Player	Date	Contract terms
Dany Sabourin	May 30, 2012	1 year, $525,000
Mike Carman	June 29, 2012	1 year, $525,000
Kevin Marshall	July 2, 2012	1 year, $525,000
Mathieu Perreault	July 5, 2012	2 years, $2.1 million
Jay Beagle	July 5, 2012	3 years, $2.7 million
Zach Hamill	July 11, 2012	1 year, $700,000
Filip Forsberg	July 13, 2012	3 years, $2.775 million entry-level contract
Mike Green	July 16, 2012	3 years, $18.25 million
Tom Wilson	July 19, 2012	3 years, $2.775 million entry-level contract
Troy Brouwer	September 12, 2012	3 years, $11 million contract extension
John Carlson	September 14, 2012	6 years, $23.8 million
Braden Holtby	February 25, 2013	2 years, $3.7 million contract extension
John Erskine	February 25, 2013	2 years, $3.925 million contract extension
Casey Wellman	March 28, 2013	2 years, $1.1 million contract extension
Jack Hillen	April 2, 2013	2 years, $1.4 million contract extension
Patrick Wey	April 5, 2013	2 years, $1.28 million entry-level contract
Ryan Stoa	April 15, 2013	1 year, $550,000 contract extension
Aaron Volpatti	April 24, 2013	2 years, $1.15 million contract extension
Eric Fehr	April 24, 2013	2 years, $3 million contract extension
Joel Rechlicz	June 26, 2013	1 year, $550,000

== Draft picks ==
Washington Capitals' picks at the 2012 NHL entry draft, held in Pittsburgh, Pennsylvania on June 22 & 23, 2012.

Round	#	Player	Pos	Nationality	College/Junior/Club team (League)
1	11^{[a]}	Filip Forsberg	C	Sweden	Leksands IF (Elitserien)
1	16	Tom Wilson	RW	Canada	Plymouth Whalers (OHL)
3	77	Chandler Stephenson	C/LW	Canada	Regina Pats (WHL)
4	100^{[b]}	Thomas Di Pauli	C	United States	U.S. National Team Development Program (USHL)
4	107	Austin Wuthrich	RW	United States	University of Notre Dame (CCHA)
5	137	Connor Carrick	D	United States	U.S. National Team Development Program (USHL)
6	167	Riley Barber	RW	United States	U.S. National Team Development Program (USHL)
7	195^{[c]}	Christian Djoos	D	Sweden	Brynas IF Jr. (J20 SuperElit)
7	197	Jaynen Rissling	D	Canada	Calgary Hitmen (WHL)
7	203^{[d]}	Sergei Kostenko	G	Russia	Metallurg Novokuznetsk-2 (MHL)

Draft notes

- ^{a} The Colorado Avalanche first-round pick went to the Washington Capitals as a result of a July 1, 2011, trade that sent Semyon Varlamov to the Avalanche in exchange for 2012 second-round pick and this pick.
- The Washington Capitals second-round pick went to the New Jersey Devils as the result of a February 28, 2011, trade that sent Jason Arnott to the Capitals in exchange for Dave Steckel and this pick.
- ^{b} The Winnipeg Jets fourth-round pick went to the Washington Capitals as a result of a July 8, 2011, trade that sent Eric Fehr to the Jets in exchange for Danick Paquette and this pick.
- ^{c} The Calgary Flames seventh-round pick went to the Washington Capitals as a result of a July 17, 2009, trade that sent Keith Seabrook to the Flames in exchange for this pick.
- ^{d} The Pittsburgh Penguins seventh-round pick went to the Washington Capitals as a result of a June 4, 2012, trade that sent Tomas Vokoun to the Penguins in exchange for this pick.

== See also ==
- 2012–13 NHL season
