= 2012–13 Tampa Bay Lightning season =

National Hockey League team season

2012–13 Tampa Bay Lightning
- Division: 4th Southeast
- Conference: 14th Eastern
- 2012–13 record: 18–26–4
- Home record: 12–10–2
- Road record: 6–16–2
- Goals for: 148
- Goals against: 150

Team information
- General manager: Steve Yzerman
- Coach: Guy Boucher (Oct.–Mar.); Jon Cooper (Mar.–Apr.)
- Captain: Vincent Lecavalier
- Alternate captains: Mattias Ohlund; Martin St. Louis; Steven Stamkos
- Arena: Tampa Bay Times Forum
- Average attendance: 19,056 (99.2%)

Team leaders
- Goals: Steven Stamkos (29)
- Assists: Martin St. Louis (43)
- Points: Martin St. Louis (60)
- Penalty minutes: B. J. Crombeen (112)
- Plus/minus: Benoit Pouliot (+8)
- Wins: Anders Lindback (10)
- Goals against average: Anders Lindback; Mathieu Garon (2.90)

The 2012–13 Tampa Bay Lightning season was the franchise's 21st season in the National Hockey League (NHL). The regular season was reduced from its usual 82 games to 48 due to the 2012–13 NHL lockout. The team missed the playoffs for the second year in a row for the first time since the 2008–09 season and the 2009–10 season As of today, this is the most recent season that the Lightning finished with a losing record.

== Regular season ==
The Lightning began the season with one of the best starts in franchise history, earning a 6–1–0 record. However, after that seventh game, the team went 7–16–1, falling to 14th out of 15 teams in the Eastern Conference. This prompted general manager Steve Yzerman to fire head coach Guy Boucher on March 24, 2013 after a 5-3 loss to the Ottawa Senators(who he would eventually end up coaching). Boucher was in his third year as the team's head coach.

One day later, the Lightning named Jon Cooper as the team's new head coach. Cooper was first hired by the organization in 2010 to coach the Lightning's American Hockey League (AHL) affiliate, the Norfolk Admirals, and after the Lightning changed affiliates, the Syracuse Crunch. While coaching the Admirals in the 2011–12 season, the team won 28 consecutive games and would go on to win the Calder Cup, sweeping the championship series. At the time of Cooper's naming as Lightning head coach, ten players on the team's roster had played for Cooper in Syracuse at some point during the season.

With goaltending having been an issue for the team all season, on April 3, the day of the trade deadline, the Lightning acquired Ben Bishop from the Ottawa Senators. In return, the Lightning dealt rookie left wing Cory Conacher, who at the time was second in the League in points among first-year players with 24, and led all rookies in assists with 15. The Lightning also gave up a fourth-round pick in the 2013 NHL entry draft.

The Lightning tied the Montreal Canadiens for the fewest shorthanded goals scored with zero.

== Standings ==
=== Divisional standings ===
Southeast Division
Pos	Team	GP	W	L	OTL	ROW	GF	GA	GD	Pts
1	y – Washington Capitals	48	27	18	3	24	149	126	+23	57
2	Winnipeg Jets	48	24	21	3	22	128	109	+19	51
3	Carolina Hurricanes	48	19	25	4	18	128	133	−5	42
4	Tampa Bay Lightning	48	18	26	4	17	148	104	+44	40
5	Florida Panthers	48	15	27	6	12	112	143	−31	36

Source: National Hockey League
y – Clinched division

=== Conference standings ===
Eastern Conference
Pos	Div	Team	GP	W	L	OTL	ROW	GF	GA	GD	Pts
1	AT	z – Pittsburgh Penguins	48	36	12	0	33	165	119	+46	72
2	NE	y – Montreal Canadiens	48	29	14	5	26	149	126	+23	63
3	SE	y – Washington Capitals	48	27	18	3	24	149	130	+19	57
4	NE	x – Boston Bruins	48	28	14	6	24	131	109	+22	62
5	NE	x – Toronto Maple Leafs	48	26	17	5	26	145	133	+12	57
6	AT	x – New York Rangers	48	26	18	4	22	130	112	+18	56
7	NE	x – Ottawa Senators	48	25	17	6	21	116	104	+12	56
8	AT	x – New York Islanders	48	24	17	7	20	139	139	0	55
9	SE	Winnipeg Jets	48	24	21	3	22	128	144	−16	51
10	AT	Philadelphia Flyers	48	23	22	3	22	133	141	−8	49
11	AT	New Jersey Devils	48	19	19	10	17	112	129	−17	48
12	NE	Buffalo Sabres	48	21	21	6	14	115	143	−28	48
13	SE	Carolina Hurricanes	48	19	25	4	18	128	160	−32	42
14	SE	Tampa Bay Lightning	48	18	26	4	17	148	150	−2	40
15	SE	Florida Panthers	48	15	27	6	12	112	171	−59	36

Source: National Hockey League
x – Clinched playoff spot; y – Clinched division; z – Clinched conference

== Schedule and results ==
The Tampa Bay Lightning 20th Anniversary patch

=== Preseason ===
As a result of the 2012–13 NHL lockout, the entire pre-season was canceled.

=== Regular season ===
Due to the 2012–13 NHL lockout, the Lightning's original 82-game schedule was reduced to a 48-game schedule in which they would face only teams from the Eastern Conference.

2012–13 Game Log
January: 5–1–0, 10 Points (home: 4–0–0; road: 1–1–0)

Game	Date	Opponent	Score	OT	Decision	Location	Attendance	Record	Points	Recap
1	January 19	Washington Capitals	6–3		Lindback	Tampa Bay Times Forum	19,204	1–0–0	2	
2	January 21	@ New York Islanders	3–4		Lindback	Nassau Veterans Memorial Coliseum	15,322	1–1–0	2	
3	January 22	@ Carolina Hurricanes	4–1		Garon	PNC Arena	18,680	2–1–0	4	
4	January 25	Ottawa Senators	6–4		Lindback	Tampa Bay Times Forum	19,204	3–1–0	6	
5	January 27	Philadelphia Flyers	5–1		Lindback	Tampa Bay Times Forum	19,204	4–1–0	8	
6	January 29	Florida Panthers	5–2		Lindback	Tampa Bay Times Forum	19,204	5–1–0	10	

February: 4–9–1, 9 Points (home: 2–4–1; road: 2–5–0)

Game	Date	Opponent	Score	OT	Decision	Location	Attendance	Record	Points	Recap
7	February 1	Winnipeg Jets	8–3		Lindback	Tampa Bay Times Forum	19,204	6–1–0	12	
8	February 2	New York Rangers	2–3		Garon	Tampa Bay Times Forum	19,204	6–2–0	12	
9	February 5	@ Philadelphia Flyers	1–2		Lindback	Wells Fargo Center	19,616	6–3–0	12	
10	February 7	@ New Jersey Devils	2–4		Lindback	Prudential Center	14,802	6–4–0	12	
–	February 9	@ Boston Bruins	Game rescheduled to April 25 due to a blizzard in Boston.							
11	February 10	@ New York Rangers	1–5		Garon	Madison Square Garden	17,200	6–5–0	12	
12	February 12	Montreal Canadiens	3–4	SO	Lindback	Tampa Bay Times Forum	19,204	6–5–1	13	
13	February 14	Washington Capitals	3–4		Garon	Tampa Bay Times Forum	19,204	6–6–1	13	
14	February 16	@ Florida Panthers	6–5	OT	Lindback	BB&T Center	17,009	7–6–1	15	
15	February 19	Toronto Maple Leafs	4–2		Lindback	Tampa Bay Times Forum	19,204	8–6–1	17	
16	February 21	Boston Bruins	2–4		Lindback	Tampa Bay Times Forum	19,204	8–7–1	17	
17	February 23	@ Carolina Hurricanes	5–2		Garon	PNC Arena	18,680	9–7–1	19	
18	February 24	@ Pittsburgh Penguins	3–5		Garon	Consol Energy Center	18,632	9–8–1	19	
19	February 26	Buffalo Sabres	1–2		Garon	Tampa Bay Times Forum	19,204	9–9–1	19	
20	February 28	@ New York Rangers	1–4		Garon	Madison Square Garden	17,200	9–10–1	19	

March: 6–8–0, 12 Points (home: 4–3–0; road: 2–5–0)

Game	Date	Opponent	Score	OT	Decision	Location	Attendance	Record	Points	Recap
21	March 2	@ Boston Bruins	2–3		Garon	TD Garden	17,565	9–11–1	19	
22	March 4	@ Pittsburgh Penguins	3–4		Lindback	Consol Energy Center	18,656	9–12–1	19	
23	March 5	@ New Jersey Devils	5–2		Lindback	Prudential Center	15,229	10–12–1	21	
24	March 7	Winnipeg Jets	1–2		Lindback	Tampa Bay Times Forum	19,204	10–13–1	21	
25	March 9	Montreal Canadiens	3–4		Desjardins	Tampa Bay Times Forum	19,204	10–14–1	21	
26	March 12	@ Florida Panthers	3–2		Lindback	BB&T Center	15,174	11–14–1	23	
27	March 14	New York Islanders	0–2		Lindback	Tampa Bay Times Forum	19,204	11–15–1	23	
28	March 16	Carolina Hurricanes	4–1		Garon	Tampa Bay Times Forum	19,204	12–15–1	25	
29	March 18	Philadelphia Flyers	4–2		Lindback	Tampa Bay Times Forum	19,204	13–15–1	27	
30	March 20	@ Toronto Maple Leafs	2–4		Garon	Air Canada Centre	19,433	13–16–1	27	
31	March 23	@ Ottawa Senators	3–5		Desjardins	Scotiabank Place	20,016	13–17–1	27	
32	March 24	@ Winnipeg Jets	2–3		Desjardins	MTS Centre	15,004	13–18–1	27	
33	March 26	Buffalo Sabres	2–1		Garon	Tampa Bay Times Forum	19,204	14–18–1	29	
34	March 29	New Jersey Devils	5–4	SO	Garon	Tampa Bay Times Forum	19,204	15–18–1	31	

April: 2–8–3, 7 Points (home: 1–3–1; road: 1–5–2)

Game	Date	Opponent	Score	OT	Decision	Location	Attendance	Record	Points	Recap
35	April 2	Florida Panthers	2–3	SO	Garon	Tampa Bay Times Forum	17,904	15–18–2	32	
36	April 4	@ Carolina Hurricanes	5–0		Bishop	PNC Arena	17,042	16–18–2	34	
37	April 6	@ New York Islanders	2–4		Bishop	Nassau Veterans Memorial Coliseum	16,170	16–19–2	34	
38	April 7	@ Washington Capitals	2–4		Bishop	Verizon Center	18,506	16–20–2	34	
39	April 9	Ottawa Senators	3–2		Bishop	Tampa Bay Times Forum	17,323	17–20–2	36	
40	April 11	Pittsburgh Penguins	3–6		Bishop	Tampa Bay Times Forum	19,204	17–21–2	36	
41	April 13	@ Washington Capitals	5–6	OT	Garon	Verizon Center	18,506	17–21–3	37	
42	April 14	@ Buffalo Sabres	1–3		Garon	First Niagara Center	18,991	17–22–3	37	
43	April 16	@ Winnipeg Jets	3–4	SO	Bishop	MTS Centre	15,004	17–22–4	38	
44	April 18	@ Montreal Canadiens	2–3		Bishop	Bell Centre	21,273	17–23–4	38	
45	April 21	Carolina Hurricanes	2–3		Lindback	Tampa Bay Times Forum	19,204	17–24–4	38	
46	April 24	Toronto Maple Leafs	5–2		Bishop	Tampa Bay Times Forum	18,826	18–24–4	40	
47	April 25	@ Boston Bruins	0–2		Lindback	TD Garden	17,565	18–25–4	40	
48	April 27	Florida Panthers	3–5		Lindback	Tampa Bay Times Forum	19,204	18–26–4	40	

2012–13 Regular Season Schedule
Lightning score listed first;

Win (2 Points) Loss (0 points) Overtime/shootout loss (1 point)

=== Playoffs ===
The Lightning were unable to qualify for the playoffs for the second year in a row.

== Player stats ==
Final stats

Skaters

Regular season
Player	GP	G	A	Pts	+/-	PIM
Martin St. Louis	48	17	43	60	0	14
Steven Stamkos	48	29	28	57	−4	32
Teddy Purcell	48	11	25	36	−1	12
Vincent Lecavalier	39	10	22	32	−5	29
Cory Conacher^{‡}	35	9	15	24	−3	16
Matt Carle	48	5	17	22	1	4
Benoit Pouliot	34	8	12	20	8	15
Victor Hedman	44	4	16	20	1	31
Alexander Killorn	38	7	12	19	−6	14
Sami Salo	46	2	15	17	5	16
Tom Pyatt	43	8	8	16	5	12
Nate Thompson	45	7	8	15	−2	17
Eric Brewer	48	4	8	12	3	30
Richard Panik	25	5	4	9	−2	4
Ryan Malone	24	6	2	8	−3	22
B. J. Crombeen	44	1	7	8	4	112
Keith Aulie	45	2	5	7	1	60
Tyler Johnson	14	3	3	6	3	4
Radko Gudas	22	2	3	5	3	38
Marc-Andre Bergeron^{‡}	12	1	4	5	3	4
Dana Tyrell	21	1	3	4	−3	4
Ondrej Palat	14	2	2	4	5	0
Adam Hall^{‡}	20	0	4	4	3	23
Pierre-Cedric Labrie	19	2	1	3	2	30
Brendan Mikkelson	4	0	1	1	1	6
Brett Connolly	5	1	0	1	−3	0
Mathieu Roy	1	0	0	0	−1	0
J. T. Wyman	1	0	0	0	−1	0
Brian Lee	22	0	0	0	−13	16
Mike Angelidis	1	0	0	0	0	0
Mark Barberio	2	0	0	0	−2	0
Matt Taormina	2	0	0	0	−1	0
Andrej Sustr	2	0	0	0	1	0
Totals		101	186	287	15	370

Goaltenders

Regular season
Player	GP	GS	TOI	W	L	OT	GA	GAA	SA	SV%	SO	G	A	PIM
Anders Lindback	24	21	1304:11	10	10	1	63	2.90	642	.902	0	0	1	0
Mathieu Garon	18	16	910:04	5	9	2	44	2.90	427	.897	0	0	0	0
Ben Bishop^{†}	9	9	502:26	3	4	1	25	2.99	302	.917	1	0	0	2
Cedrick Desjardins	3	2	160:06	0	3	0	8	3.00	73	.890	0	0	0	0
Totals		48	2876:47	21	23	4	140	2.92	1444	.903	1	0	1	2

^{†}Denotes player spent time with another team before joining Tampa Bay. Stats reflect time with Tampa Bay only.
^{‡}Traded to Tampa Bay mid-season.
Bold/italics denotes franchise record

== Awards and records ==
=== Awards ===
Regular season
Player	Award	Awarded
Martin St. Louis	NHL Third Star of the Week	January 28, 2013
Steven Stamkos	NHL Second Star of the Week	February 25, 2013
Steven Stamkos	NHL First Star of the Month (February)	March 1, 2013
Martin St. Louis	Art Ross Trophy	April 2013
Martin St. Louis	Lady Byng Memorial Trophy	June 14, 2013

=== Milestones ===
Regular season
Player	Milestone	Reached
Cory Conacher	1st career NHL game 1st career NHL assist 1st career NHL goal 1st career NHL point	January 19, 2013
Teddy Purcell	100th career NHL assist	January 19, 2013
Vincent Lecavalier	1,000th career NHL game	January 21, 2013
Alexander Killorn	1st career NHL game 1st career NHL assist 1st career NHL point	February 10, 2013
Richard Panik	1st career NHL game	February 12, 2013
B. J. Crombeen	300th career NHL game	February 14, 2013
Alexander Killorn	1st career NHL goal	February 16, 2013
Brian Lee	200th career NHL game	February 19, 2013
Richard Panik	1st career NHL goal 1st career NHL point	February 23, 2013
Ondrej Palat	1st career NHL game 1st career NHL assist 1st career NHL point	March 4, 2013
Tom Pyatt	200th career NHL game	March 9, 2013
Radko Gudas	1st career NHL game	March 12, 2013
Keith Aulie	100th career NHL game	March 14, 2013
Tyler Johnson	1st career NHL game	March 14, 2013
Teddy Purcell	300th career NHL game	March 16, 2013
Tyler Johnson	1st career NHL goal 1st career NHL assist 1st career NHL point	March 16, 2013
Ondrej Palat	1st career NHL goal	March 16, 2013
Matt Carle	500th career NHL game	March 18, 2013
Steven Stamkos	200th career NHL goal	March 18, 2013
Radko Gudas	1st career NHL goal 1st career NHL point	March 20, 2013
Richard Panik	1st career NHL assist	March 23, 2013
Andrej Sustr	1st career NHL game	March 29, 2013
Nate Thompson	300th career NHL game	April 6, 2013
Mark Barberio	1st career NHL game	April 9, 2013
Pierre-Cedric Labrie	1st career NHL goal	April 9, 2013
Martin St. Louis	900th career NHL point	April 9, 2013
Sami Salo	800th career NHL game	April 13, 2013

== Transactions ==
The Lightning have been involved in the following transactions during the 2012–13 season.

=== Trades ===
Date	Details
June 15, 2012	To Nashville Predators Sebastien Caron; 2nd-round pick in 2012; 2nd-round pick in 2012; 3rd-round pick in 2013	To Tampa Bay Lightning Anders Lindback; Kyle Wilson; 7th-round pick in 2012
June 23, 2012	To Boston Bruins Michel Ouellet; 5th-round pick in 2012	To Tampa Bay Lightning Benoit Pouliot (Note: Trade of negotiating rights to.)
July 10, 2012	To St. Louis Blues 4th-round pick in 2013; 4th-round pick in 2014	To Tampa Bay Lightning B. J. Crombeen; 5th-round pick in 2014
January 21, 2013	To Florida Panthers Future considerations	To Tampa Bay Lightning Jean-Francois Jacques
February 14, 2013	To Montreal Canadiens Dustin Tokarski	To Tampa Bay Lightning Cedrick Desjardins
March 11, 2013	To Anaheim Ducks Kyle Wilson	To Tampa Bay Lightning Dan Sexton
April 2, 2013	To Carolina Hurricanes Marc-Andre Bergeron	To Tampa Bay Lightning Adam Hall; 7th-round pick in 2013
April 2, 2013	To Chicago Blackhawks Kirill Gotovets	To Tampa Bay Lightning Philippe Paradis
April 3, 2013	To Ottawa Senators Cory Conacher; 4th-round pick in 2013	To Tampa Bay Lightning Ben Bishop

=== Free agents signed ===
Player	Former team	Contract terms
Artem Sergeev	Val-d'Or Foreurs	3 years, $1.7 million entry-level contract
Sami Salo	Vancouver Canucks	2 years, $7.5 million
Matt Carle	Philadelphia Flyers	6 years, $33 million
Matt Taormina	New Jersey Devils	1 year, $700,000
Dmitri Korobov	Dinamo Minsk	2 years, $1.55 million
Andrej Sustr	University of Nebraska Omaha	2 years, $1.85 million entry-level contract
Mathieu Roy	Hamburg Freezers	3 games
Reto Suri	EV Zug	1 year, $867,500 entry-level contract

=== Free agents lost ===
Player	New team	Contract terms
Trevor Smith	Pittsburgh Penguins	1 year, $575,000
Bruno Gervais	Philadelphia Flyers	2 years, $1.65 million
Brandon Segal	New York Rangers	1 year, $550,000
Tim Wallace	Carolina Hurricanes	1 year, $700,000

=== Claimed via waivers ===
Player	Former team	Date claimed off waivers

=== Lost via waivers ===
Player	New team	Date claimed off waivers
Adam Hall	Carolina Hurricanes	March 16, 2013
Adam Hall	Philadelphia Flyers	April 3, 2013

=== Lost via retirement ===
Player

=== Player signings ===
Player	Date	Contract terms
Riku Helenius	June 14, 2012	2 years, $1.2 million
Adam Hall	June 15, 2012	1 year, $650,000
J. T. Wyman	June 15, 2012	1 year, $600,000
Mike Angelidis	June 18, 2012	1 year, $525,000
Brendan Mikkelson	June 27, 2012	1 year, $600,000
Brian Lee	June 28, 2012	2 years, $2.3 million
Keith Aulie	June 30, 2012	1 year, $577,500
Evan Oberg	July 1, 2012	1 year, $560,000
Benoit Pouliot	July 1, 2012	1 year, $1.8 million
Anders Lindback	July 6, 2012	2 years, $3.6 million
Teddy Purcell	July 10, 2012	3 years, $13.5 million contract extension
Nikita Kucherov	September 10, 2012	3 years, $2.2275 million entry-level contract
Slater Koekkoek	March 20, 2013	3 years, $2.775 million entry-level contract
Nate Thompson	March 23, 2013	4 years, $6.4 million contract extension
Tanner Richard	April 1, 2013	3 years, $1.925 million entry-level contract
Luke Witkowski	April 1, 2013	2 years, $1.255 million entry-level contract
B. J. Crombeen	April 1, 2013	2 years, $2.3 million contract extension
Ben Bishop	April 15, 2013	2 years, $4.6 million contract extension
Nikita Nesterov	April 30, 2013	3 years, $2.2275 million entry-level contract
Cedric Paquette	May 3, 2013	3 years, $1.9 million entry-level contract
Radko Gudas	May 6, 2013	3 years, $2.975 million contract extension
Keith Aulie	June 26, 2013	1 year, $975,000
Mike Angelidis	June 27, 2013	1 year, $550,000

== Draft picks ==
Tampa Bay Lightning's picks at the 2012 NHL entry draft, held in Pittsburgh, Pennsylvania on June 22 & 23, 2012.

Round	#	Player	Pos	Nationality	College/Junior/Club team (League)
1	10	Slater Koekkoek	D	Canada	Peterborough Petes (OHL)
1	19^{[a]}	Andrei Vasilevskiy	G	Russia	Tolpar Ufa (MHL)
2	40	Dylan Blujus	D	United States	Brampton Battalion (OHL)
2	53^{[b]}	Brian Hart	RW	United States	Phillips Exeter Academy (USHS-NH)
3	71	Tanner Richard	C	Canada	Guelph Storm (OHL)
4	101	Cedric Paquette	C	Canada	Blainville-Boisbriand Armada (QMJHL)
6	161	Jake Dotchin	D	Canada	Owen Sound Attack (OHL)
7	202^{[c]}	Nikita Gusev	LW	Russia	CSKA Moscow Jr. (MHL)

Draft Notes

- ^{a} The Detroit Red Wings' first-round pick went to the Tampa Bay Lightning as a result of a February 21, 2012, trade that sent Kyle Quincey to the Red Wings in exchange for Sebastien Piche and this pick.
- ^{b} The Philadelphia Flyers' second-round pick (originally from the Florida Panthers) went to the Tampa Bay Lightning as a result of a February 18, 2012, trade that sent Pavel Kubina to the Flyers in exchange for Jon Kalinski, 2013 fourth-round pick and this pick.
- The Tampa Bay Lightning's fifth-round pick went to the Boston Bruins as the result of a June 23, 2012, trade that sent Benoit Pouliot to the Lightning in exchange for Michel Ouellet and this pick.
- The Tampa Bay Lightning's seventh-round pick went to the San Jose Sharks as the result of a February 16, 2012, trade that sent a 2012 second-round pick to the Lightning in exchange for Dominic Moore and this pick.
- ^{c} The Nashville Predators' seventh-round pick went to the Tampa Bay Lightning as a result of a June 15, 2012, trade that sent Sebastien Caron, two 2012 second-round picks and a 2013 third-round pick to the Predators in exchange for Anders Lindback, Kyle Wilson and this pick.

== See also ==
- 2012–13 NHL season
