= Mark Mancari =

Canadian ice hockey player (born 1985)

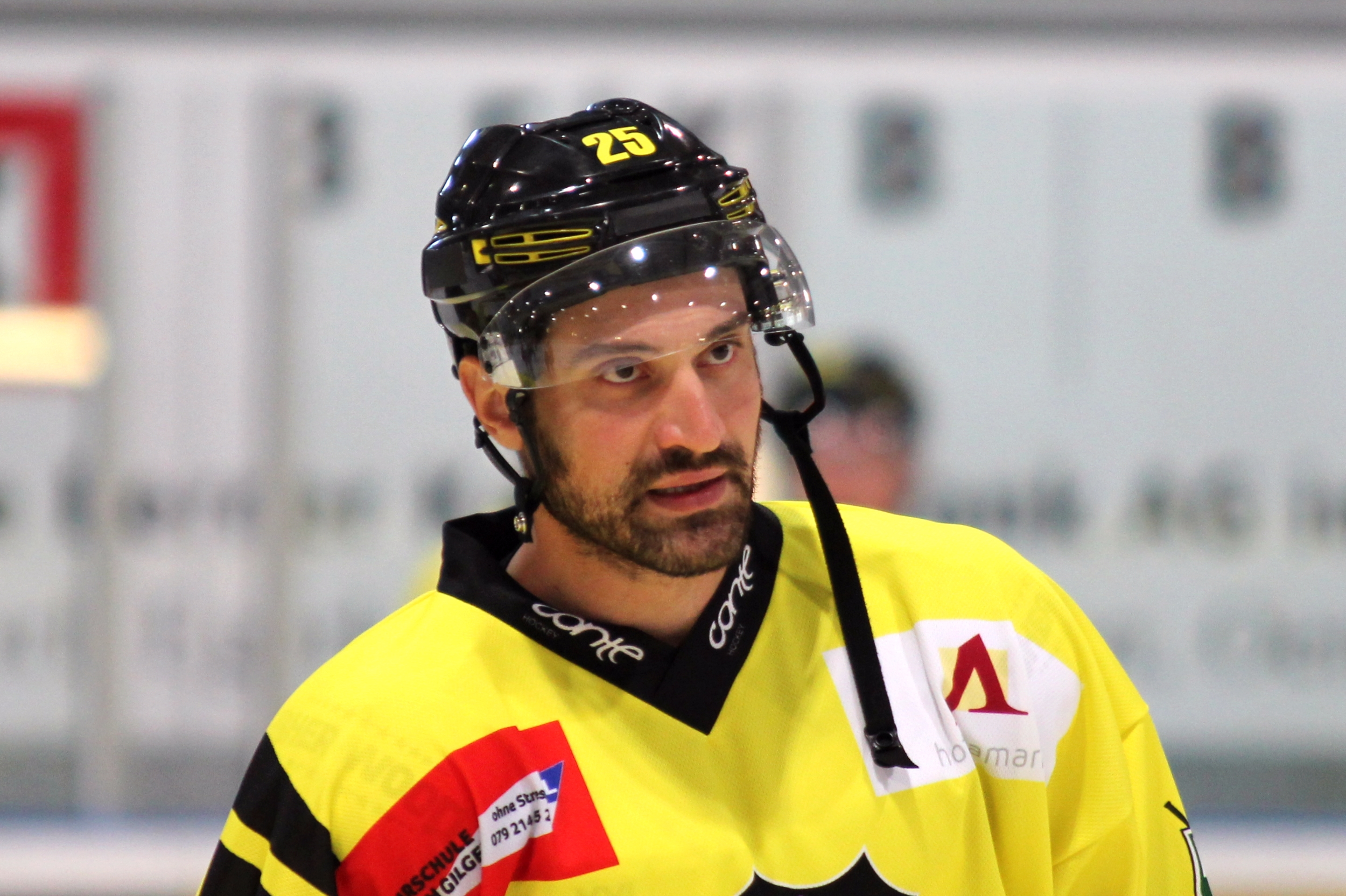
- Mancari in 2016
- Born: July 11, 1985 (age 41) London, Ontario, Canada
- Height: 6 ft 3 in (191 cm)
- Weight: 225 lb (102 kg; 16 st 1 lb)
- Position: Right wing
- Shot: Right
- Played for: Buffalo Sabres; Vancouver Canucks; Augsburger Panther; Krefeld Pinguine
- NHL draft: 207th overall, 2004; Buffalo Sabres
- Playing career: 2005–2019

Mark Mancari (born July 11, 1985) is a Canadian former professional ice hockey right winger. Mancari was drafted by the Buffalo Sabres in the seventh round (207th overall) of the 2004 NHL entry draft.

== Playing career ==
After playing four seasons in the Ontario Hockey League with the Ottawa 67's, Mancari made his professional debut with the Sabres' American Hockey League affiliate, the Rochester Americans, in the 2005–06 season. He played in 71 games and recorded 42 points. He made his National Hockey League debut with the Buffalo Sabres in the 2006–07 season, recording one assist in three games. He currently holds the AHL's hardest-shot record, with a speed of 102.8 mph in the 2008 AHL All-Star Classic Skills Competition.

Mancari was called up from Portland on November 21, 2008. The next day, he scored his first NHL goal against the New York Islanders. He was reassigned to the AHL on December 7, 2008, and named to the 2009 AHL Canadian All-Star team on January 6, 2009.

Mancari began the 2010–11 NHL season in Portland where he played 23 games for the Pirates before being recalled to the NHL to suit up for the Sabres on December 7, 2010. Mancari assisted on one goal in the away game against the Boston Bruins.

He signed a one-year contract worth $525,000 with the Vancouver Canucks on July 1, 2011. After one season in the Canucks' organization he returned to the Sabres, signing a one-year contract.

On July 5, 2013, Mancari again left the Sabres organization and signed a one-year, two-way deal with the St. Louis Blues.

On March 2, 2014, Mancari was traded to the Florida Panthers in return for Eric Selleck. He was assigned to AHL affiliate, the San Antonio Rampage where he would later secure an AHL contract for the following 2014–15 season.

On July 17, 2015, Mancari embarked on a European career, joining German club, Augsburger Panther of the Deutsche Eishockey Liga (DEL) on a one-year deal.

On March 9, 2016, Mancari left Augsburger as a free agent and signed a two-year deal with fellow DEL side Krefeld Pinguine. In leaving Krefeld after just one season, Mancari continued in Germany by appearing in the DEL2 with EHC Freiburg.

On May 9, 2018, Mancari left Germany to sign a one-year contract with the Graz 99ers in the neighbouring EBEL. Before joining the 99ers for pre-season, Mancari was unable to partake in a physical, cancelling his contract with the club. He later opted to return to EHC Freiburg on December 13, 2018. After playing in 10 games with Freiburg, Mancari retired from professional hockey on January 13, 2019.

== Career statistics ==
			Regular season					Playoffs
Season	Team	League	GP	G	A	Pts	PIM	GP	G	A	Pts	PIM
2000–01	St. Marys Lincolns	GOHL	52	10	10	20	21	—	—	—	—	—
2001–02	Nepean Raiders	CJHL	16	10	14	24	26	9	3	1	4	14
2001–02	Ottawa 67's	OHL	34	3	3	6	10	2	0	1	1	0
2002–03	Ottawa 67's	OHL	61	8	11	19	20	11	2	1	3	2
2003–04	Ottawa 67's	OHL	67	29	36	65	56	7	5	3	8	11
2004–05	Ottawa 67's	OHL	64	36	32	68	86	21	14	10	24	24
2005–06	Rochester Americans	AHL	71	18	24	42	80	—	—	—	—	—
2006–07	Rochester Americans	AHL	64	23	34	57	49	6	1	5	6	6
2006–07	Buffalo Sabres	NHL	3	0	1	1	2	—	—	—	—	—
2007–08	Rochester Americans	AHL	80	21	36	57	78	—	—	—	—	—
2008–09	Portland Pirates	AHL	73	29	38	67	61	5	1	2	3	2
2008–09	Buffalo Sabres	NHL	7	1	1	2	4	—	—	—	—	—
2009–10	Portland Pirates	AHL	74	28	45	73	55	4	1	1	2	2
2009–10	Buffalo Sabres	NHL	6	1	1	2	4	—	—	—	—	—
2010–11	Portland Pirates	AHL	56	32	32	64	57	9	6	6	12	0
2010–11	Buffalo Sabres	NHL	20	1	7	8	12	1	0	0	0	0
2011–12	Vancouver Canucks	NHL	6	0	0	0	0	—	—	—	—	—
2011–12	Chicago Wolves	AHL	69	30	28	58	40	5	0	7	7	6
2012–13	Rochester Americans	AHL	76	22	39	61	68	3	0	2	2	12
2013–14	Chicago Wolves	AHL	44	9	22	31	22	—	—	—	—	—
2013–14	San Antonio Rampage	AHL	11	0	2	2	2	—	—	—	—	—
2014–15	San Antonio Rampage	AHL	74	13	33	46	41	3	0	1	1	2
2015–16	Augsburger Panther	DEL	51	9	25	34	24	—	—	—	—	—
2016–17	Krefeld Pinguine	DEL	49	12	17	29	12	—	—	—	—	—
2017–18	EHC Freiburg	DEL2	32	15	30	45	16	—	—	—	—	—
2018–19	EHC Freiburg	DEL2	10	2	3	5	4	—	—	—	—	—
AHL totals			692	225	333	558	553	35	9	24	33	30
NHL totals			42	3	10	13	22	1	0	0	0	0

== Awards and honours ==
Award	Year
AHL
First All-Star Team	2011
