= Alexander Sulzer =

German ice hockey player (born 1984)

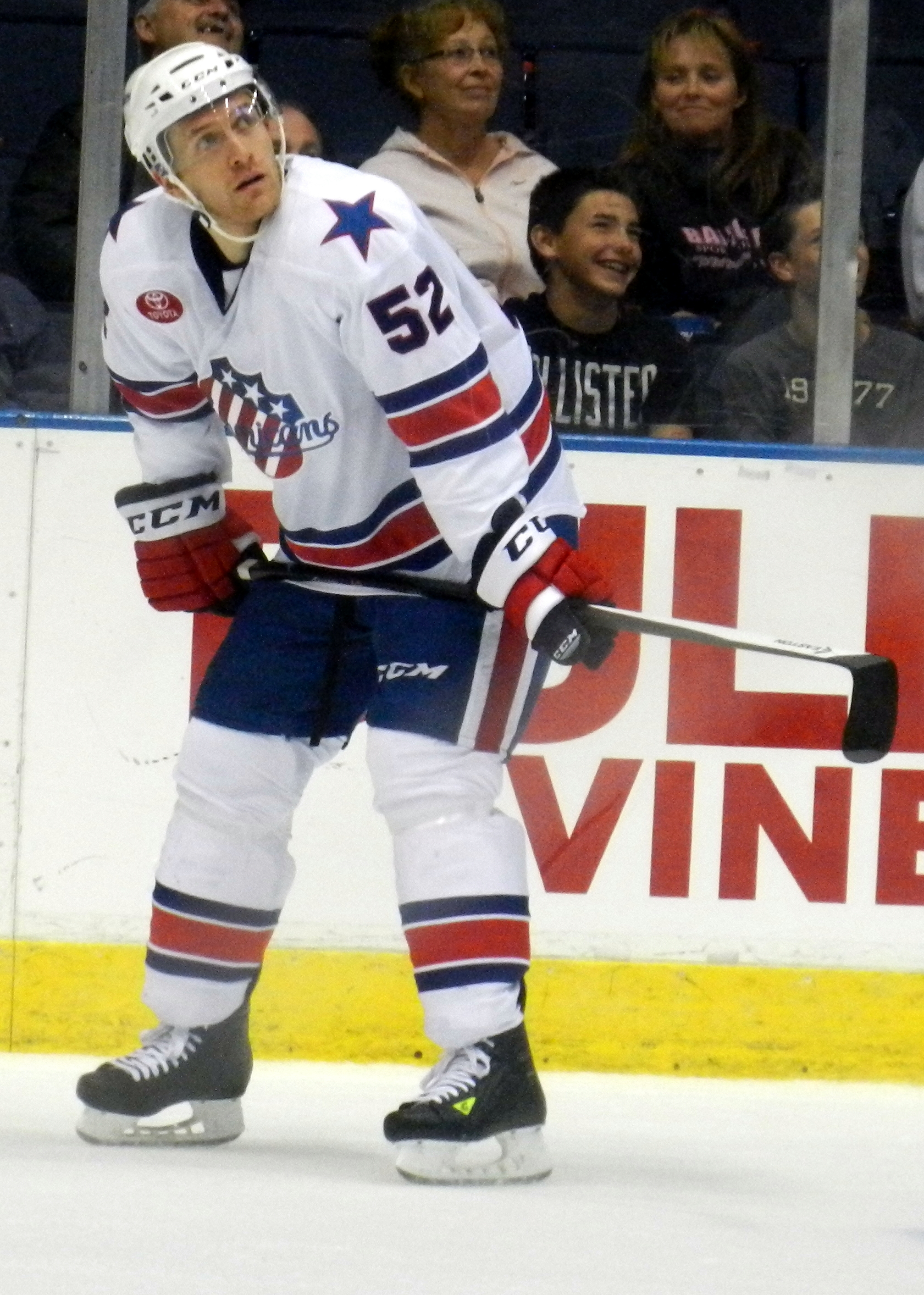
- Sulzer with the Rochester Americans in 2013
- Born: May 30, 1984 (age 42) Kaufbeuren, West Germany
- Height: 6 ft 1 in (185 cm)
- Weight: 198 lb (90 kg; 14 st 2 lb)
- Position: Defence
- Shot: Left
- Played for: Hamburg Freezers; Düsseldorfer EG; Nashville Predators; Florida Panthers; Vancouver Canucks; ERC Ingolstadt; Buffalo Sabres; Kölner Haie
- National team: Germany
- NHL draft: 92nd overall, 2003; Nashville Predators
- Playing career: 2000–2019

Alexander Sulzer (born May 30, 1984) is a German former professional ice hockey defenceman who played in the Deutsche Eishockey Liga (DEL) and National Hockey League (NHL).

== Playing career ==
Born in Kaufbeuren, West Germany, Sulzer went through the youth system of the local ESV Kaufbeuren (ESVK). He first received ice time with the men's team in the third-tier Oberliga in 2000–01 as a sixteen-year-old. Two years later, in 2002–03, he split time between ESVK's team in the second-tier 2. Bundesliga and the Hamburg Freezers of the premiere Deutsche Eishockey Liga (DEL) under Förderlizenz. In the subsequent off-season, Sulzer was selected by the Nashville Predators in the third round of the 2003 NHL entry draft, 92nd overall.

Following his draft, Sulzer remained in the higher-profile DEL, transferring to the DEG Metro Stars. He spent four seasons with the Metro Stars, recording a DEL career-high 18 points (three goals and 15 assists) over 48 games in 2005–06. He also helped the team reach the playoff finals that year, recording 9 points over 13 post-season games.

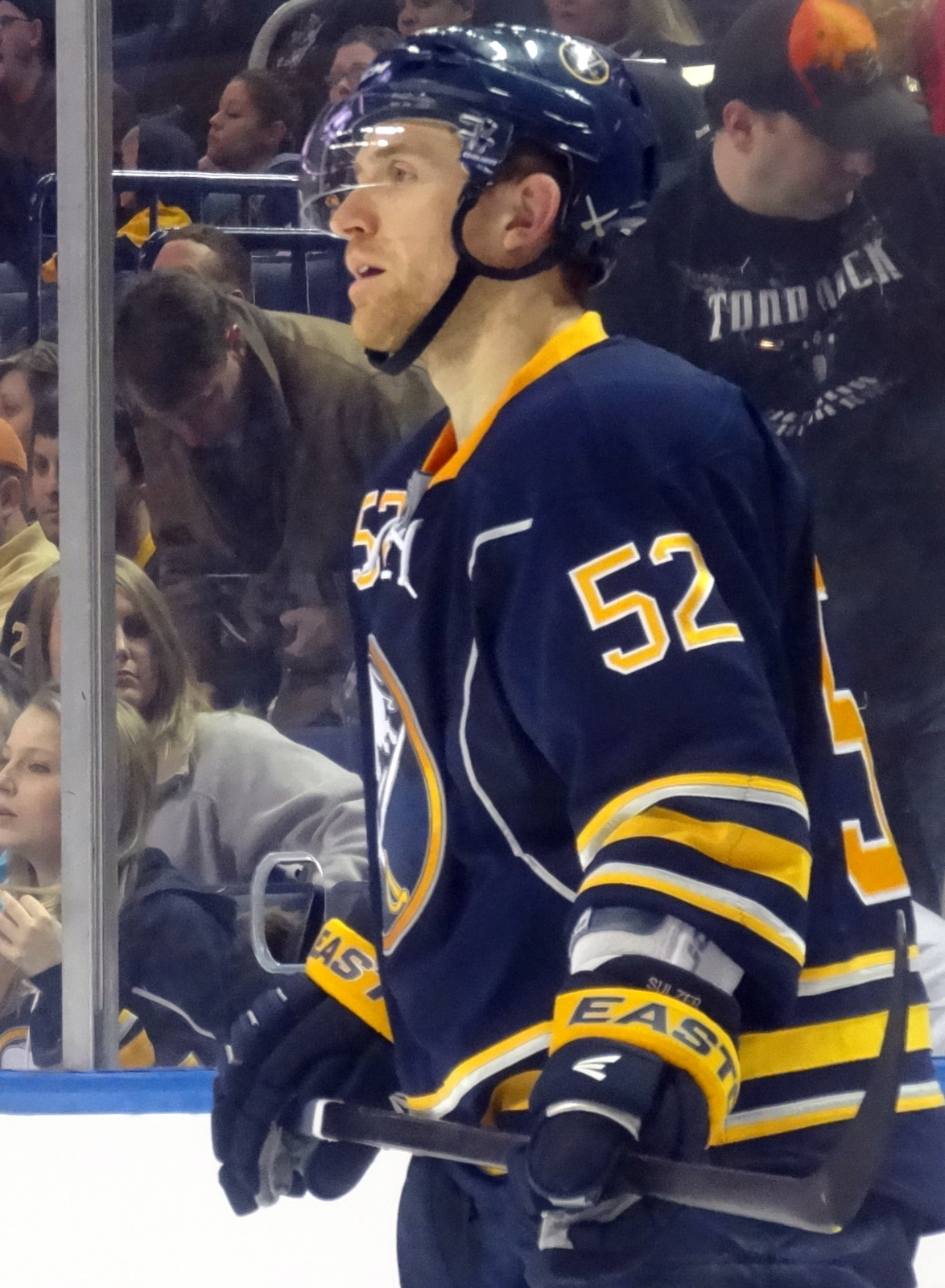
Sulzer playing for the Buffalo Sabres in 2013

On June 1, 2007, he signed a two-year contract with the Predators. Moving to North America to play in the Predators organization, he was assigned to the team's American Hockey League (AHL) affiliate, the Milwaukee Admirals, for the 2007–08 season. He recorded 32 points over 61 games as a rookie in the AHL. The following season, he improved to 34 points over 48 games with Milwaukee, while also earning his first NHL call-up, appearing in two games for the Predators. Sulzer became a more regular addition to the Predators' lineup in 2009–10, dressing for 20 NHL games, while also recording 30 points over 36 games in between call-ups.

Sulzer scored his first NHL goal on January 23, 2011 against Devan Dubnyk of the Edmonton Oilers. The following month, on February 25, he was traded to the Florida Panthers in exchange for a conditional draft pick. Splitting the season between the Predators and Panthers, he recorded 5 points over 40 games.

During the off-season, Sulzer became an unrestricted free agent. On July 7, 2011, he signed with the Vancouver Canucks. He made the team out of training camp, but was a healthy scratch for the first three weeks of the season before dressing for his first game as a Canuck on October 26, 2011. On NHL trade deadline day, Sulzer was dealt to the Buffalo Sabres, along with forward Cody Hodgson, in exchange for defenseman Marc-Andre Gragnani and forward Zack Kassian.

On May 21, 2012, the Buffalo Sabres re-signed Sulzer to a one-year contract extension worth $725,000. In explaining the extension to media gathered at First Niagara Center, GM Darcy Regier said, "(Sulzer) played very well with Christian (Ehrhoff). And I think the other thing you really notice out there is his composure; his ability to not only break up plays defensively, but to make plays offensively with the patience that he showed. We were pleasantly surprised with his play, and that moved us toward getting him signed."

For the 2013–14 season, Sulzer spent 25 games with the Sabres and 10 games (mostly at the beginning of the season) with the Rochester Americans of the American Hockey League. He sustained a concussion on March 13 and missed the remainder of the season.

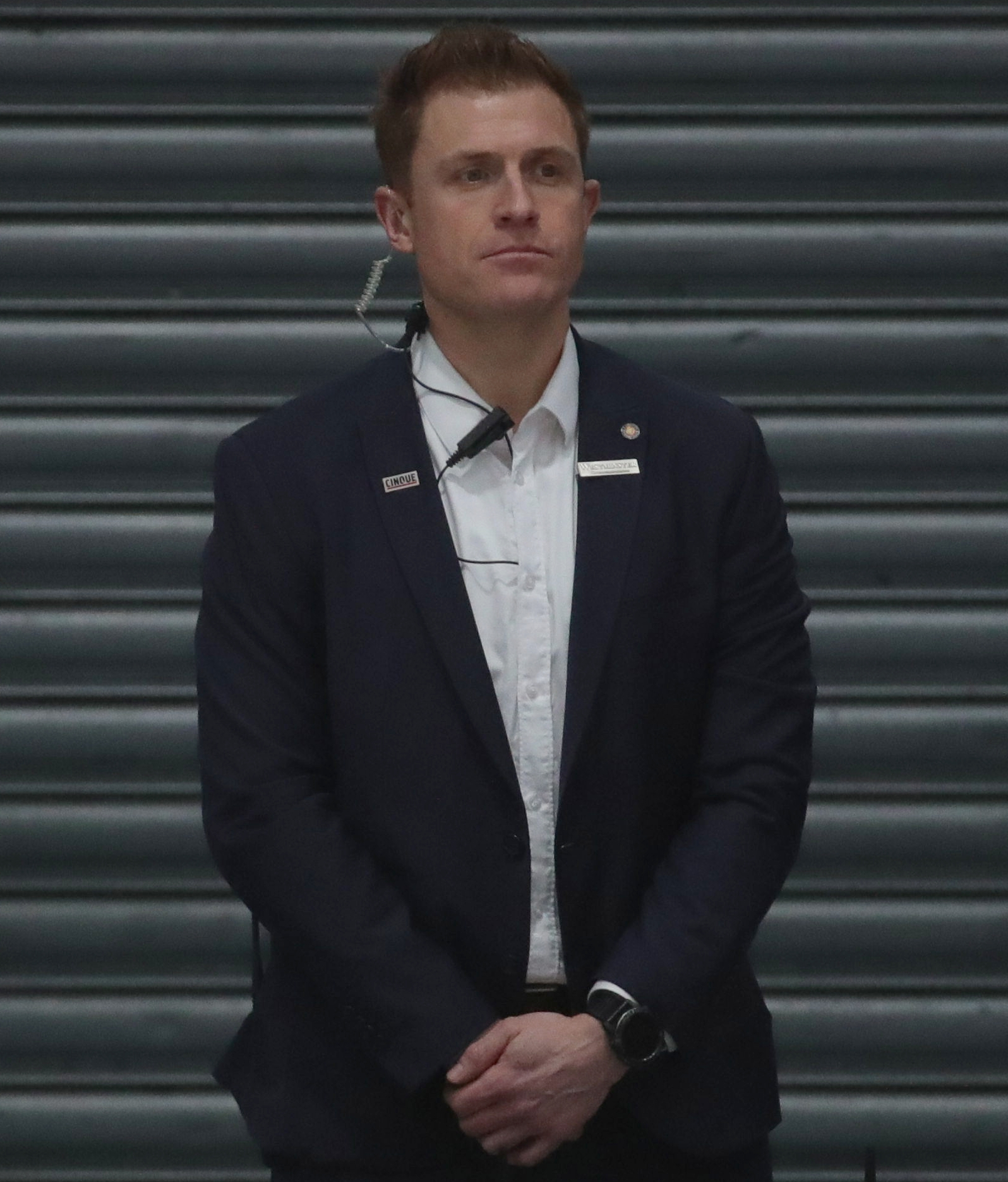
Sulzer in 2023

Sulzer signed a five-year contract with Kölner Haie on May 1, 2014.

At the conclusion of his contract in Cologne, Sulzer opted to leave as a free agent and return to former club, Düsseldorfer EG, then known as the Metro Stars, signing a one-year contract on May 9, 2019. Prior to the 2019–20 season, Sulzer was diagnosed with a tumour in the vicinity of his cervical spine. The benign tumour was completely removed during an operation in August 2019, and he effectively ended his 19 year professional career, announcing his retirement on September 4, 2020.

== International play ==
Sulzer has played for the German national team in the 2005 and 2006 World Championships, and at the 2006 Winter Olympics in Turin, as well as the 2010 Winter Olympics in Vancouver.

== Career statistics ==
=== Regular season and playoffs ===
			Regular season					Playoffs
Season	Team	League	GP	G	A	Pts	PIM	GP	G	A	Pts	PIM
2000–01	ESV Kaufbeuren	DEU U20	1	0	2	2	2	—	—	—	—	—
2000–01	ESV Kaufbeuren	DEU.3	38	3	7	10	20	3	1	0	1	2
2001–02	ESV Kaufbeuren	DEU U20	1	0	0	0	4	—	—	—	—	—
2001–02	ESV Kaufbeuren	DEU.3	18	1	9	10	14	—	—	—	—	—
2002–03	ESV Kaufbeuren	DEU.2	26	4	3	7	38	—	—	—	—	—
2002–03	Hamburg Freezers	DEL	18	4	9	13	18	5	0	0	0	12
2003–04	DEG Metro Stars	DEL	46	4	1	5	51	4	0	0	0	8
2004–05	DEG Metro Stars	DEL	45	5	6	11	68	—	—	—	—	—
2004–05	Füchse Duisburg	DEU.2	—	—	—	—	—	7	0	3	3	6
2005–06	DEG Metro Stars	DEL	48	3	15	18	82	13	3	6	9	22
2006–07	DEG Metro Stars	DEL	44	4	11	15	82	9	2	1	3	20
2007–08	Milwaukee Admirals	AHL	61	7	25	32	47	—	—	—	—	—
2008–09	Milwaukee Admirals	AHL	48	8	26	34	36	—	—	—	—	—
2008–09	Nashville Predators	NHL	2	0	0	0	0	—	—	—	—	—
2009–10	Milwaukee Admirals	AHL	36	7	23	30	8	7	1	5	6	2
2009–10	Nashville Predators	NHL	20	0	2	2	4	—	—	—	—	—
2010–11	Nashville Predators	NHL	31	1	3	4	14	—	—	—	—	—
2010–11	Florida Panthers	NHL	9	0	1	1	0	—	—	—	—	—
2011–12	Vancouver Canucks	NHL	12	0	1	1	2	—	—	—	—	—
2011–12	Buffalo Sabres	NHL	15	3	5	8	6	—	—	—	—	—
2012–13	ERC Ingolstadt	DEL	21	2	14	16	8	—	—	—	—	—
2012–13	Buffalo Sabres	NHL	17	3	1	4	10	—	—	—	—	—
2013–14	Rochester Americans	AHL	10	2	5	7	2	—	—	—	—	—
2013–14	Buffalo Sabres	NHL	25	0	2	2	8	—	—	—	—	—
2014–15	Kölner Haie	DEL	44	6	20	26	36	—	—	—	—	—
2015–16	Kölner Haie	DEL	30	3	13	16	18	15	1	2	3	6
2016–17	Kölner Haie	DEL	39	2	4	6	12	7	0	0	0	0
2017–18	Kölner Haie	DEL	32	0	8	8	18	5	0	1	1	2
2018–19	Kölner Haie	DEL	26	1	9	10	16	—	—	—	—	—
DEL totals			393	30	102	132	409	58	6	10	16	70
AHL totals			155	24	79	103	101	7	1	5	6	2
NHL totals			131	7	15	22	44	—	—	—	—	—

=== International ===
Year	Team	Event	Result	GP	G	A	Pts	PIM
2003	Germany	WJC	9th	6	0	2	2	14
2004	Germany	WJC D1	12th	5	2	7	9	12
2005	Germany	WC	15th	3	0	0	0	4
2006	Germany	OG	10th	5	0	1	1	2
2006	Germany	WC D1	17th	5	0	3	3	2
2007	Germany	WC	9th	6	0	0	0	4
2010	Germany	OG	11th	4	0	0	0	4
2010	Germany	WC	4th	9	0	2	2	4
Junior totals				11	2	9	11	26
Senior totals				32	0	6	6	20
