= Eric Selleck =

Canadian ice hockey player

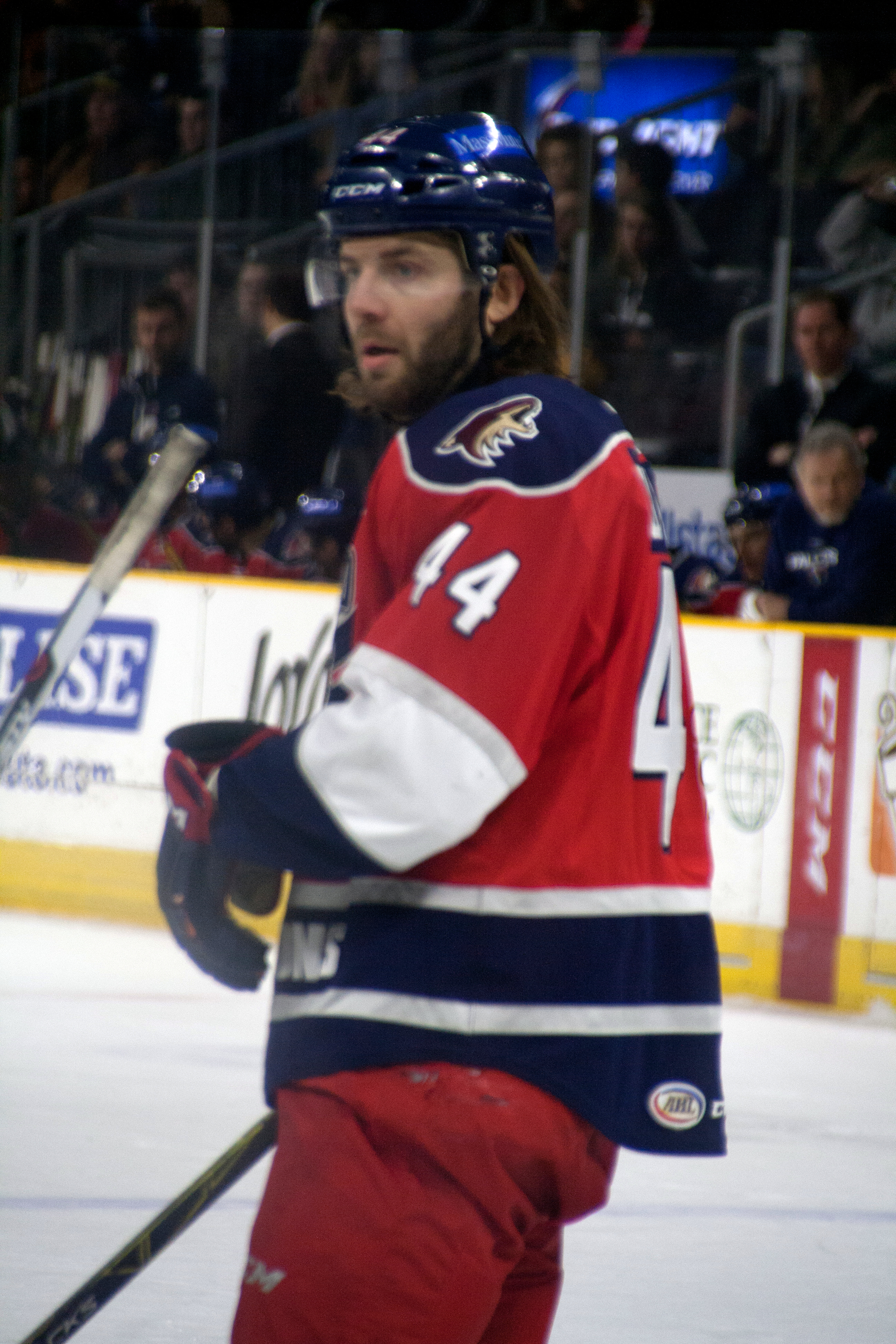
- Selleck with the Springfield Falcons in 2016
- Born: October 20, 1987 (age 38) Spencerville, Ontario, Canada
- Height: 6 ft 2 in (188 cm)
- Weight: 208 lb (94 kg; 14 st 12 lb)
- Position: Left wing
- Shoots: Left
- team Former teams: Free Agent; Florida Panthers; Arizona Coyotes; HC '05 Banská Bystrica
- NHL draft: Undrafted
- Playing career: 2010–present

Eric Selleck (born October 20, 1987) is a Canadian professional ice hockey player. He is currently an unrestricted free agent who most recently was under contract with the Norfolk Admirals of the ECHL.

== Playing career ==
Before turning professional, Selleck attended the State University of New York at Oswego where he played two seasons of NCAA Division III college hockey. On April 21, 2010, the Florida Panthers signed Selleck as a free agent to a two-way, two-year entry-level contract.

During the midpoint of the lockout shortened 2012–13 season, Selleck received his first NHL recall from the Panthers on March 19, 2013. He would be ejected from the game in the third period for instigating a fight with Hurricanes forward Kevin Westgarth.

In the 2013–14 season, on March 2, 2014, Selleck was traded to the St. Louis Blues in return for Mark Mancari.

As a free agent and unable to attain an NHL contract, Selleck signed a one-year AHL contract with the Portland Pirates, an affiliate of the Arizona Coyotes, on August 19, 2014. In the 2014–15 season, Selleck enjoyed his best season as a professional, recording a career high 23 points in 74 games with the Pirates.

On July 3, 2015, Selleck remained within the Coyotes organization, signing as a free agent to a one-year, two-way contract with Arizona.

After the 2015–16 season, Selleck was again out of contract with the Coyotes. On August 5, 2016, Selleck signed a one-year AHL contract with the Coyotes new affiliate, the Tucson Roadrunners. In the 2016–17 season, Selleck dropped his production offensively, falling to 5 goals and 9 points in 46 games.

As a free agent from the Roadrunners in the following off-season, Selleck continued in the AHL by agreeing to a one-year deal with the Hartford Wolf Pack on July 28, 2017. In the 2017–18 season, Selleck in a depth role struggled to find his scoring touch with the Wolf Pack, registering 3 goals in 32 games. On February 22, 2018, Selleck was traded by the Wolf Pack to the Belleville Senators for future considerations.

Following two seasons abroad in Slovakia with HC '05 Banská Bystrica of the Tipsport Extraliga (Slovak) and lower tiered club, Bratislava Capitals, Selleck opted to return to North America agreeing to extend his professional career in the ECHL with the Norfolk Admirals on September 15, 2020.

In 2021-22, Selleck played for the Gananoque Islanders of the Eastern Ontario Super Hockey League.

== Career statistics ==
			Regular season					Playoffs
Season	Team	League	GP	G	A	Pts	PIM	GP	G	A	Pts	PIM
2006–07	Pembroke Lumber Kings	CJHL	53	23	24	47	137	15	4	8	12	29
2007–08	Pembroke Lumber Kings	CJHL	49	43	38	81	120	14	8	21	29	28
2008–09	Oswego State	SUNYAC	26	13	13	26	45	—	—	—	—	—
2009–10	Oswego State	SUNYAC	28	21	33	54	48	—	—	—	—	—
2010–11	Rochester Americans	AHL	67	5	11	16	214	—	—	—	—	—
2011–12	San Antonio Rampage	AHL	71	5	4	9	204	9	0	0	0	4
2012–13	San Antonio Rampage	AHL	60	5	11	16	181	—	—	—	—	—
2012–13	Florida Panthers	NHL	2	0	1	1	17	—	—	—	—	—
2013–14	San Antonio Rampage	AHL	42	3	4	7	93	—	—	—	—	—
2013–14	Chicago Wolves	AHL	18	3	2	5	70	9	0	1	1	17
2014–15	Portland Pirates	AHL	74	8	15	23	185	5	1	1	2	8
2015–16	Springfield Falcons	AHL	60	10	12	22	137	—	—	—	—	—
2015–16	Arizona Coyotes	NHL	1	0	0	0	5	—	—	—	—	—
2016–17	Tucson Roadrunners	AHL	46	5	4	9	103	—	—	—	—	—
2017–18	Hartford Wolf Pack	AHL	32	3	0	3	46	—	—	—	—	—
2017–18	Belleville Senators	AHL	18	2	2	4	39	—	—	—	—	—
2018–19	HC '05 Banská Bystrica	Slovak	42	11	24	35	135	13	4	5	9	2
2019–20	Bratislava Capitals	Slovak.1	41	17	29	46	145	—	—	—	—	—
NHL totals			3	0	1	1	22	—	—	—	—	—
