= Casey Wellman =

American ice hockey player (born 1987)

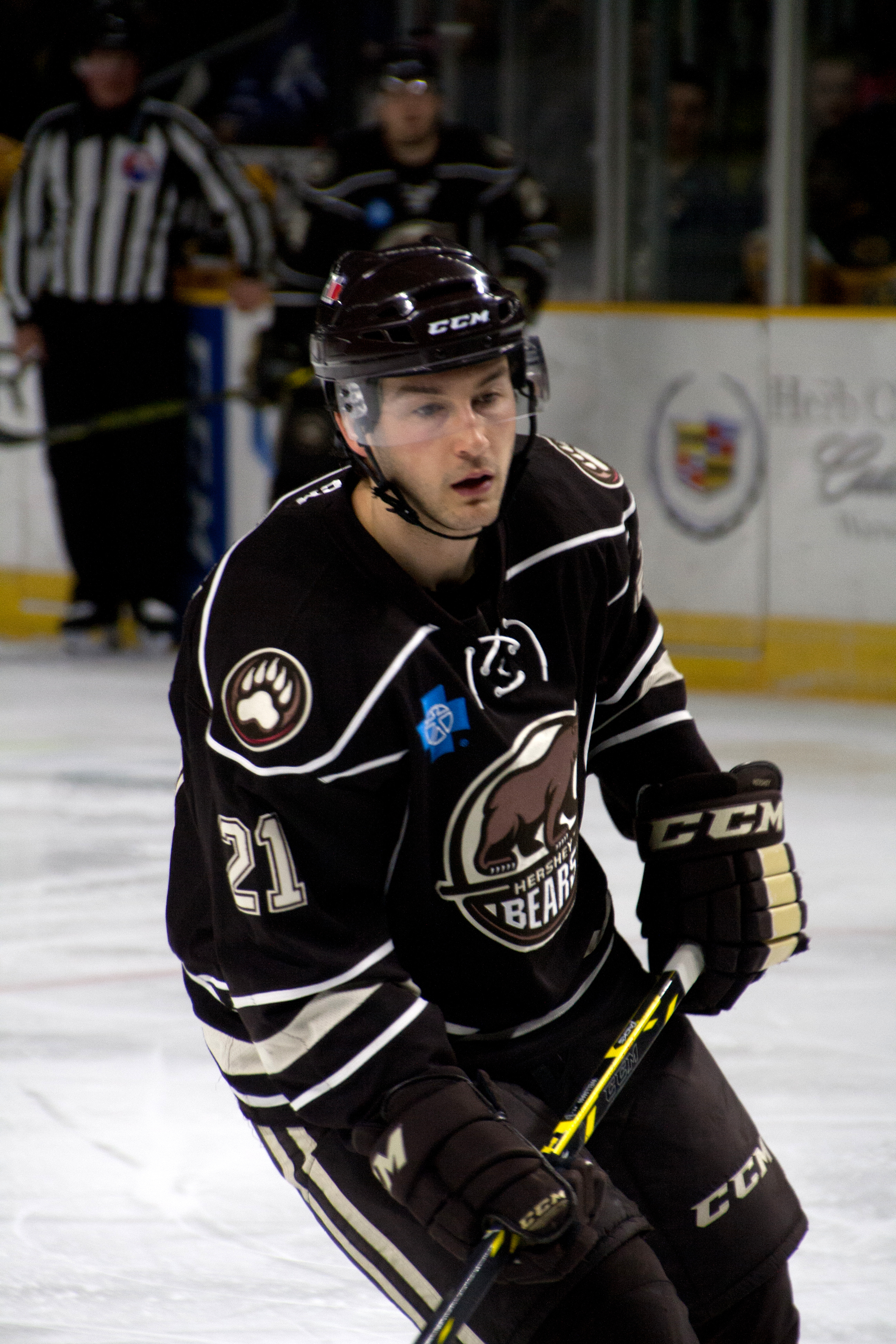
- Wellman with the Hershey Bears in 2015
- Born: October 18, 1987 (age 39) Castro Valley, California, U.S.
- Height: 6 ft 1 in (185 cm)
- Weight: 185 lb (84 kg; 13 st 3 lb)
- Position: Center
- Shot: Right
- Played for: Minnesota Wild; Washington Capitals; Spartak Moscow; Frölunda HC; HC Sochi; SC Rapperswil-Jona Lakers; Kunlun Red Star; Oulun Kärpät
- NHL draft: Undrafted
- Playing career: 2010–2022

Casey Jay Wellman (born October 18, 1987) is an American former professional ice hockey center who played for the Minnesota Wild and Washington Capitals.

== Playing career ==
As a youth, Wellman played in the 2001 Quebec International Pee-Wee Hockey Tournament with the San Jose Junior Sharks minor ice hockey team.

A native of Brentwood, California, while in high school, Wellman played hockey at Cranbrook Kingswood School in Bloomfield Hills, Michigan, winning state titles in 2004 and 2006. He then attended the University of Massachusetts Amherst for two years where he played on the UMass Minutemen ice hockey team.

He was signed to a two-year entry-level contract on March 16, 2010, as a college free-agent.

On February 3, 2012, Wellman was traded to the New York Rangers for center Erik Christensen and a conditional 7th round draft pick in 2013. He spent the remainder of the 2011–12 season with the Whale, but after Connecticut was eliminated from the AHL playoffs, Wellman was added to the Rangers' playoff roster.

On July 20, 2012, Wellman was traded to the Florida Panthers in exchange for a 2014 5th round draft pick. He started the 2012–13 season with AHL affiliate, the San Antonio Rampage before he was traded by the Panthers to the Washington Capitals in exchange for forward Zach Hamill on January 31, 2013.

Wellman was called up to the Capitals on December 17, 2013. He was reassigned to the AHL Hershey Bears on December 23, 2013. He was recalled a second time to the Washington Capitals on January 24, 2014 in time to play with the Capitals as they faced Montreal. Wellman scored a goal off of an assist from Capitals captain Alex Ovechkin in the second period and helped the team end a seven-game losing streak.

On June 4, 2015, HC Spartak Moscow of the KHL announced that it has signed Wellman. He saw the ice in 40 games, tallying eight goals and eight assists for Spartak. Upon the conclusion of the 2015–16 season, Wellman moved on to Sweden, penning a one-year deal with SHL side Frölunda HC on May 30, 2016.

After two seasons in the National League with Swiss club, SC Rapperswil-Jona Lakers, Wellman returned to the KHL in signing a one-year contract with Chinese based, HC Kunlun Red Star, on September 16, 2020. With Kunlun later stationed in Russia for the duration of the 2020–21 season due to logistics surrounding the COVID-19 pandemic, Wellman contributed with 13 points through 31 regular season games.

Wellman left the KHL as a free agent and was signed to a two-year contract with Finnish club, Oulun Kärpät of the Liiga, on May 28, 2021, but only ended up playing one year there before retiring.

== Family ==
Wellman is the son of former Giants infielder Brad Wellman.

== Career statistics ==
			Regular season					Playoffs
Season	Team	League	GP	G	A	Pts	PIM	GP	G	A	Pts	PIM
2006–07	Cedar Rapids RoughRiders	USHL	50	6	13	19	30	6	1	2	3	0
2007–08	Cedar Rapids RoughRiders	USHL	59	22	23	45	30	3	1	1	2	4
2008–09	University of Mass-Amherst	HE	39	11	22	33	32	—	—	—	—	—
2009–10	University of Mass-Amherst	HE	36	23	22	45	38	—	—	—	—	—
2009–10	Minnesota Wild	NHL	12	1	3	4	0	—	—	—	—	—
2010–11	Minnesota Wild	NHL	15	1	1	2	4	—	—	—	—	—
2010–11	Houston Aeros	AHL	42	14	21	35	14	24	6	5	11	6
2011–12	Houston Aeros	AHL	26	14	12	26	21	—	—	—	—	—
2011–12	Minnesota Wild	NHL	14	2	5	7	0	—	—	—	—	—
2011–12	Connecticut Whale	AHL	31	9	13	22	10	9	4	5	9	10
2012–13	San Antonio Rampage	AHL	37	7	16	23	14	—	—	—	—	—
2012–13	Hershey Bears	AHL	33	9	21	30	4	5	3	0	3	2
2013–14	Hershey Bears	AHL	58	18	19	37	12	—	—	—	—	—
2013–14	Washington Capitals	NHL	13	2	1	3	0	—	—	—	—	—
2014–15	Hershey Bears	AHL	73	25	29	54	28	10	3	3	6	8
2015–16	HC Spartak Moscow	KHL	40	8	8	16	20	—	—	—	—	—
2016–17	Frölunda HC	SHL	45	14	19	33	2	14	9	7	16	6
2017–18	HC Sochi	KHL	47	10	21	31	6	—	—	—	—	—
2018–19	SC Rapperswil-Jona Lakers	NL	39	17	9	26	10	—	—	—	—	—
2019–20	SC Rapperswil-Jona Lakers	NL	24	9	13	22	2	—	—	—	—	—
2020–21	Kunlun Red Star	KHL	31	5	8	13	14	—	—	—	—	—
2021–22	Oulun Kärpät	Liiga	35	6	7	13	12	—	—	—	—	—
NHL totals			54	6	10	16	4	—	—	—	—	—

== Awards and honors ==
Award	Year
All-Hockey East Rookie Team	2008–09
