= 2012–13 New York Rangers season =

National Hockey League season

2012–13 New York Rangers
- Division: 2nd Atlantic
- Conference: 6th Eastern
- 2012–13 record: 26–18–4
- Home record: 16–6–2
- Road record: 10–12–2
- Goals for: 130
- Goals against: 112

Team information
- General manager: Glen Sather
- Coach: John Tortorella
- Captain: Ryan Callahan
- Alternate captains: Brad Richards; Marc Staal
- Arena: Madison Square Garden
- Average attendance: 17,200 (94.5%)

Team leaders
- Goals: Rick Nash (21)
- Assists: Derek Stepan (26)
- Points: Derek Stepan (44)
- Penalty minutes: Arron Asham (50)
- Plus/minus: Derek Stepan (+25)
- Wins: Henrik Lundqvist (24)
- Goals against average: Lundqvist (2.05)

The 2012–13 New York Rangers season was the franchise's 86th season of play and their 87th season overall. The regular season was reduced from its usual 82 games to 48 due to a lockout. The lockout ended on January 5 when the NHL and NHL Players' Association (NHLPA) reached an agreement. The Rangers defeated the Washington Capitals in the Eastern Conference Quarterfinals, but were defeated by the Boston Bruins in the Eastern Conference Semi-finals. After the Rangers' season ended, John Tortorella was fired as head coach.

== Off-season ==
After speculation that began during the 2011–12 season, Rick Nash was traded to the Rangers in a blockbuster trade on July 23, 2012, giving the Rangers the much-needed scoring winger they were seeking. The Rangers sent forwards Artem Anisimov and Brandon Dubinsky, defenseman Tim Erixon and a first-round draft pick in 2013 to the Blue Jackets in exchange. The Rangers also received minor league defenseman Steven Delisle and a conditional third-round draft pick in 2013 (the condition being that the Rangers make the Stanley Cup Finals in 2013) from Columbus. Nash had been on the trade bloc since the February 2012 trade deadline, after Nash had requested a trade out of Columbus.

On September 15, the collective bargaining agreement expired and the NHL owners locked-out the league.

== Pre-season ==
The New York Rangers were scheduled to play six exhibition games (all on the road) prior to the beginning of the regular season, but due to the ongoing labor negotiations between the League and the players resulting in a lockout, the NHL cancelled all preseason games in September on September 19. The Rangers were scheduled to play the New Jersey Devils on September 26 (in Albany) and on September 28, and the Philadelphia Flyers on September 29. Later, on September 27, the NHL cancelled the remainder of the pre-season. The Rangers were scheduled to play the New York Islanders on October 4, the Colorado Avalanche on October 6 (in Kansas City, Missouri) and the Los Angeles Kings on October 8.

== 2012–13 NHL Lockout ==
On October 4, the first two weeks of the 2012–13 season was cancelled due to the 2012–13 NHL lockout. Cancellations would continue until games for the 2012–13 season were cancelled through January 14, 2013, on December 20, 2012. This was the last set of game cancellations before the NHL and NHLPA came to an agreement on a new CBA on January 6, 2013.

During the lockout, nine New York Rangers (Arron Asham, Brian Boyle, Steve Eminger, Dan Girardi, Jeff Halpern, Henrik Lundqvist, Taylor Pyatt, Brad Richards and Marc Staal) played as part of Team New York in Operation Hat Trick, a charity game to benefit Hurricane Sandy relief efforts. The game was played on November 24, 2012, at Atlantic City's Boardwalk Hall. Team New York beat Team New Jersey 10–6 in front of 10,792 spectators.

== Regular season ==
Once the new CBA was signed, the Rangers were able to open their 2013 training camp on January 13, 2013. The new regular season schedule was announced, with all teams playing within their conference for a shortened 48-game season beginning on January 19.

=== January ===
The New York Rangers opened the season on January 19 with a 3–1 loss against the Boston Bruins. They were outshot 34 to 21, and failed to capitalize on a 90-second five-on-three during the third period, when they were trailing 2–1. While Brad Richards attributed the team's poor performance to "rust" from the eight-month layoff, John Tortorella refused to entertain any questions from reporters about the topic. The team fared even worse the next day against the Pittsburgh Penguins, who defeated them 6–3 during New York's first home game at Madison Square Garden. The Rangers gave up two power play goals in the first 30 minutes, and although they scored two of their three goals during the third period, the rally came too late. Lundqvist was pulled from the net in the third period after giving up four goals.

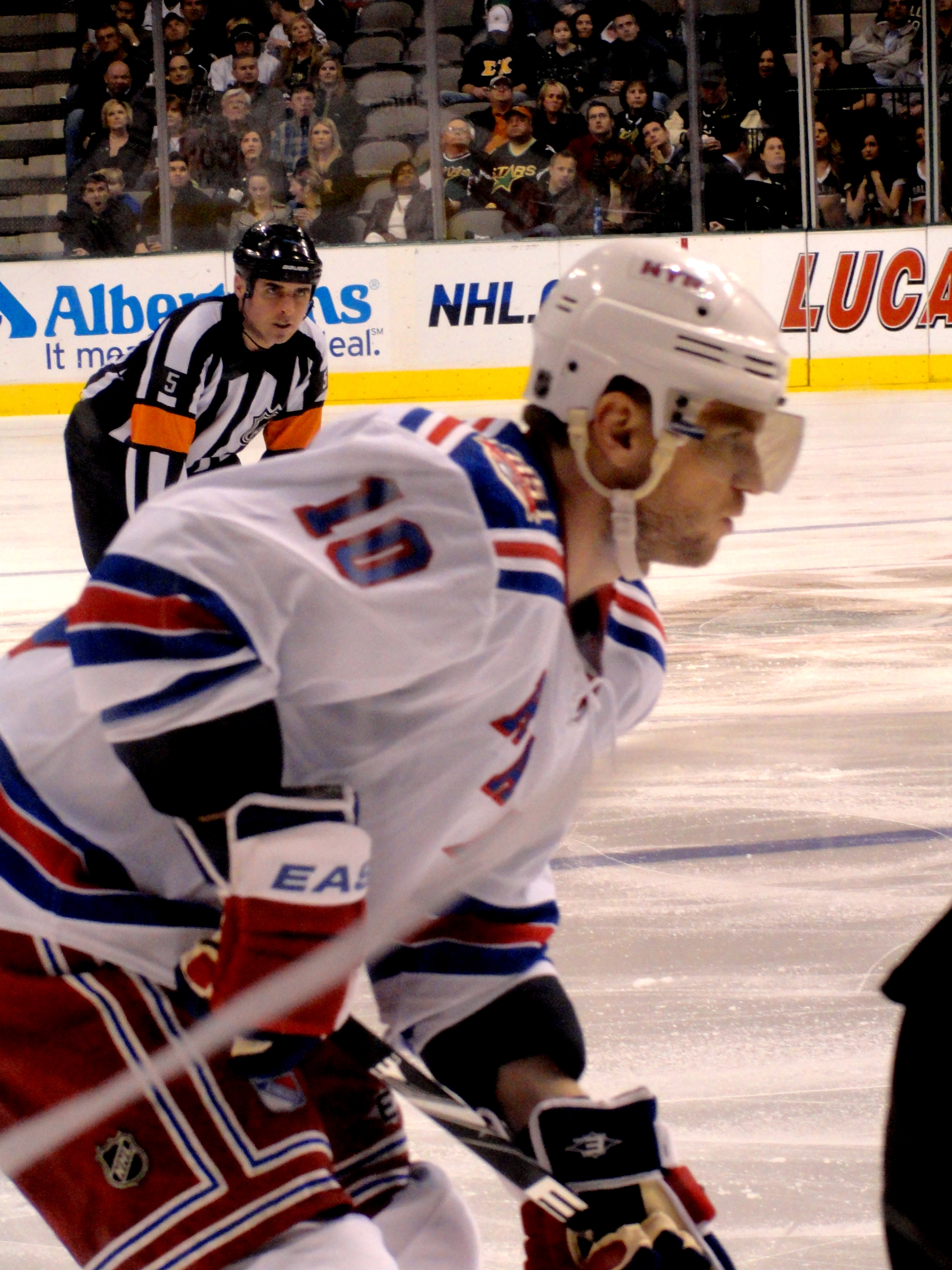
Marian Gaborik got his fifth hat trick as a Ranger during the January 23 game against the Boston Bruins.

The Rangers captured their first win of the season on January 23, besting the Bruins 4–3 in overtime. Rick Nash, Brad Richards and Marian Gaborik were placed in a line together for the first time and dominated the game, making 15 of the team's 33 shots. Gaborik scored a hat-trick, the 14th of his career and fifth as a Ranger, capturing his third goal on a breakaway 27 seconds into overtime. Zach Parise of the Minnesota Wild would tie Gaborik's mark on February 26, 2013, when he scored 27 seconds into the overtime period to give the Wild a 2–1 home win over the Calgary Flames. Both goals would prove to be the fastest overtime goals scored during the lockout-shortened season. But on January 24, New York lost 1–2 to a previously winless Philadelphia Flyers, despite Lundqvist making 31 saves and the Flyers lacking their top forwards due to injuries or suspensions. Taylor Pyatt scored his third goal in as many games, but the Gaborik, Richards and Nash line managed only three shots, and the Flyers killed nearly four minutes of consecutive Rangers power play in the third period.

Chris Kreider, who scored five goals during his debut in the 2012 playoffs, was scratched for the Flyers game and would not for the next five games. This led Tortorella to consider sending him back to the American Hockey League, although it was later learned Kreider had been playing since January 5 with a bone chip in his right ankle. The Rangers next earned their first two consecutive wins, beating the Toronto Maple Leafs 5–2 after a two-goal deficit on January 26, followed by Philadelphia 2–1 on January 29. New York sent into the third period against Toronto trailing 1–2, but won after a four-goal rally in the third period. Gáborík captured two goals, bringing his season total to five. The Rangers outshot the Maple Leafs 42 to 17, but failed to score on four power plays.

Against Philadelphia, Ryan Callahan scored a goal to earn his 200th career point, but suffered a left shoulder subluxation during a third period fight with Maxime Talbot, an injury that was expected to make him miss up to 14 days. The Flyers only goal came on the power play shortly after Callahan left, raising concerns about how his absence would affect the Ranger's penalty killing and defensive forward play. The Rangers ended the month with a 0–3 loss to the Pittsburgh Penguins on January 31, the team's first shutout loss in 31 regular season games. New York failed to score on four power plays without Callahan and surrendered seven penalties, including their fourth penalty for too many men on the ice in seven games, the most of any team in the league.

=== February ===
The Rangers won their third in four games with a 3–2 victory over the Tampa Bay Lightning on February 2, but lost 3–1 to the New Jersey Devils on February 5, a game in which Chris Kreider scored his first regular season goal. Afterward, John Tortorella said the Rangers played too "scared" and "tentative." However, the team went on to win four of their next five games, starting with a 4–1 victory against the New York Islanders on February 7 that also marked the return of Ryan Callahan. Nineteen-year-old rookie forward J. T. Miller scored two goals, marking the Rangers' first multi-goal Madison Square Garden debut since Chris Kontos in 1993. Miller scored the team's only fourth power play goal out of 37 opportunities, giving them the worst power play record of the season at that point. Brian Boyle was a healthy scratch and missed a total of three games due to poor performance.

The Rangers defeated the Tampa Bay Lightning 5–1 on February 10, and beat the Boston Bruins in overtime on February 12. Boston tied game with a three-goal rally in the third period, including two goals in 91 seconds with the goaltender pulled, but Callahan made the game-winning shootout goal in the fourth round. During that game, the Rangers received their sixth penalty of the season for too many men on the ice, the most of any team in the league. They lost 3–4 in overtime against the New York Islanders on February 14, surrendering a 0–2 lead after the Islanders scored three goals in seven minutes during the second period. Hagelin scored his fourth goal in three games to tie the game, but they lost in an overtime shootout when Gaborik's and Nash's shots were stopped. The Rangers beat the Washington Capitals 2–1 on February 17, bringing New York to seventh place and putting them in playoff contention for the first time all season.

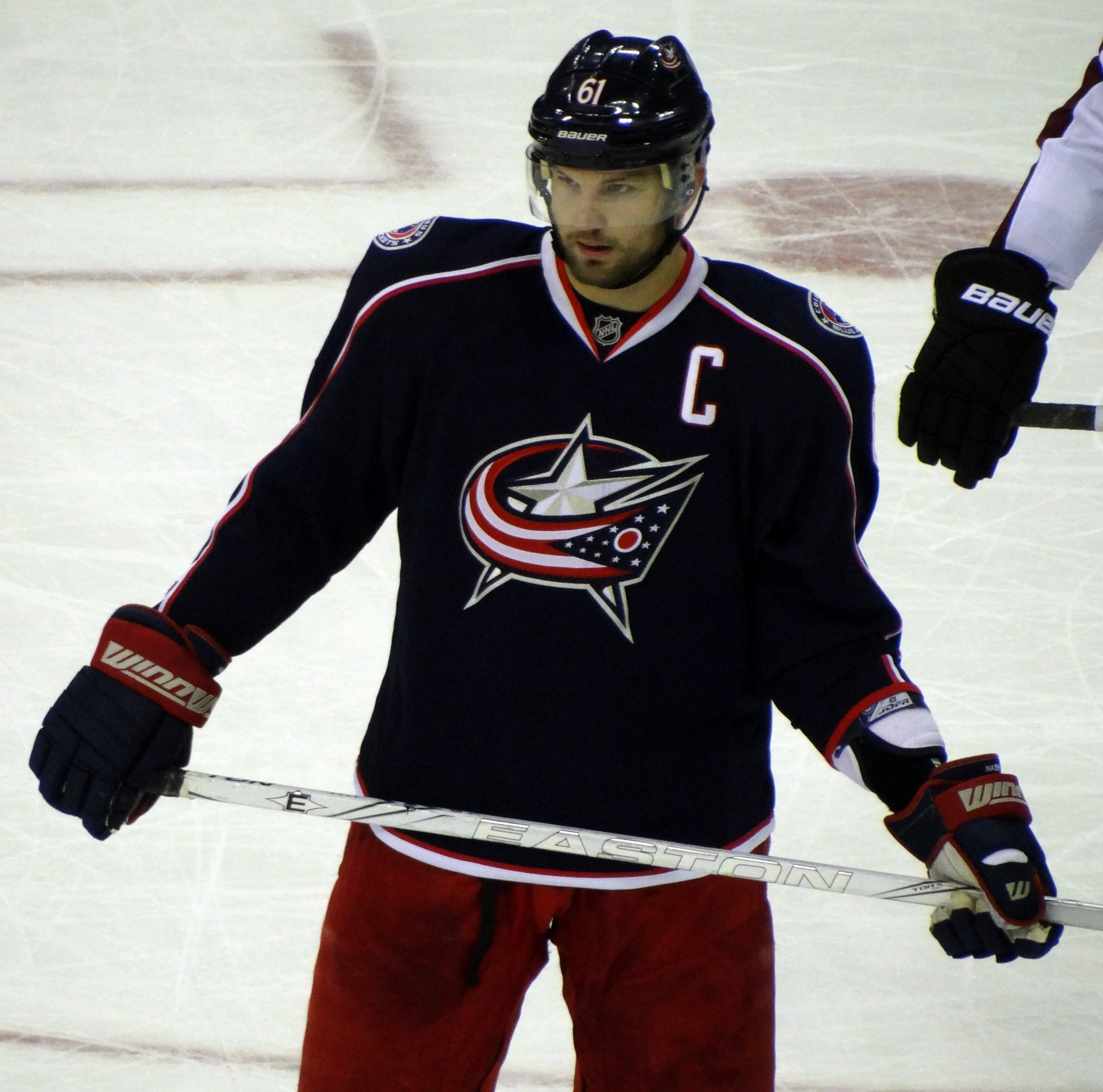
Rick Nash, pictured here in 2011, missed four games due to an injury, which corresponded with a four-game Rangers losing streak.

Darroll Powe left the game with a concussion after accidentally colliding with Washington's Matt Hendricks and landing on his head. He was placed on injured reserve and missed the next three games, and Brandon Mashinter was called up from Whale to fill in for him in that time. Nash also missed the next four games due to an unspecified injury widely suspected to be a concussion. His absence corresponded with a four-game losing streak for the Rangers, starting with a 3–1 loss to the Montreal Canadiens on February 19. Arron Asham missed the next five games after that due to back spasms. New York lost 3–2 in overtime to the Ottawa Senators on February 21, where Callahan was the only Ranger to score in a seven-round shootout. Michael Del Zotto suffered a lower body injury that took him out of the next two games, and the Rangers briefly recalled Christian Thomas and Steve Eminger from the Whale due to the team's litany of injuries. Tortorella believed the team was struggling with consistency problems, despite what he called strong play in recent games from Carl Hagelin and Derek Stepan.

The Rangers suffered two more injuries during their 0–3 shutout loss to the Canadiens on February 23. McDonagh was hit into the glass by forward Max Pacioretty, requiring 14 stitches near his mouth and forcing him out of the next game. Dan Girardi was injured when a shot by P. K. Subban struck his ankle, but he did not suffer a fracture and missed no games. The Rangers started a four-game homestead on February 26 with a 4–3 loss to the Winnipeg Jets. Callahan received a standing ovation after blocking two shots and making two hits despite lacking a stick, but it failed to rally the Rangers. New York broke their losing streak with a 4–1 win against Tampa Bay on February 28, a game that also saw the return of Nash, Del Zotto and McDonagh. Nash scored a goal and made a career-high 12 shots in the game, and Hagelin scored his seventh goal of the season, tying him with Gaborik as the team's lead goal-scorer. The game brought their season penalty kill percentage to ninth best in the league. Kreider, who had one goal and one assist in 11 games, was sent back to the Whale on February 28.

=== March ===
On March 3, the Rangers were trailing the Buffalo Sabres 1–0 at home after two periods. Early in the third, Sabres forward Patrick Kaleta was given a five-minute major and a game misconduct for checking Brad Richards from behind. He would later be given a suspension. Rangers scored on a 5-on-3 opportunity, and then another power play goal. The game was tied by a shorthanded goal from Nathan Gerbe and went into overtime. Rick Nash and Ryan Callahan each scored in the shootout to win it for the Rangers Two days later, the Rangers hosted the Philadelphia Flyers. Ryan Callahan scored a pair of goals in the first period, and Rick Nash scored two in the third to lead the Rangers to a 4–2 victory. On March 7, the Rangers played the Islanders in Nassau Coliseum. Nash scored a late goal to prevent a 1–0 loss, and the game went to overtime. Rangers connected on the power play and Marian Gaborik found the perfect time to get out of his scoring slump. The next day, Rangers lost 3–2 to the Ottawa Senators at home. On March 10, the Rangers topped the Capitals 4–1 in Washington. On March 12, Derek Stepan scored his first NHL short-handed goal against Buffalo, but the Rangers lost 3–1. Two days later, the Rangers were defeated 3–1 in Winnipeg, and two days after that, they were shutout 3–0 in Pittsburgh. On March 18, Rangers ended their three-game slump by beating the Carolina Hurricanes 2–1 in a shootout. The next day, the Rangers traveled to New Jersey. Michael Del Zotto gave the Rangers a 1–0 lead, but the Devils were quick to tie it. Carl Hagelin gave them a 2–1 lead, but again the Devils tied it. In the second period, Nash's goal gave Rangers a 3–2 lead that they would hold on to for the rest of the game. On March 21, Rangers were beaten by the Florida Panthers 3–1 on home ice. On March 23, Rangers were beaten 3–2 in the shootout by the Capitals. Two days later, the Rangers beat the Flyers on the road 5–2. They did not end the month well as they were shutout by the Senators and Montreal Canadiens, respectively.

=== April ===
The Rangers acquired Ryane Clowe on April 2, and on April 3, the day of the NHL trade deadline, they acquired Derick Brassard, Derek Dorsett and John Moore. Clowe, Brassard and Moore made their debuts with the Rangers on April 3 in a game against the Pittsburgh Penguins at Madison Square Garden, which the Rangers won 6–1. This trio made history as it was the first time in franchise history that three players making their debuts scored goals in the same game, as Brassard had a goal and three assists, Clowe had two goals and an assist, and Moore had one goal. Brassard's four points was also the most for a Rangers debut since Doug Bentley in 1954.

== Standings ==
=== Divisional standings ===
Atlantic Division
Pos	Team	GP	W	L	OTL	ROW	GF	GA	GD	Pts
1	Pittsburgh Penguins	48	36	12	0	33	165	119	+46	72
2	New York Rangers	48	26	18	4	22	130	112	+18	56
3	New York Islanders	48	24	17	7	20	139	139	0	55
4	Philadelphia Flyers	48	23	22	3	22	133	141	−8	49
5	New Jersey Devils	48	19	19	10	17	112	129	−17	48

Source: National Hockey League

=== Conference standings ===
Eastern Conference
Pos	Div	Team	GP	W	L	OTL	ROW	GF	GA	GD	Pts
1	AT	z – Pittsburgh Penguins	48	36	12	0	33	165	119	+46	72
2	NE	y – Montreal Canadiens	48	29	14	5	26	149	126	+23	63
3	SE	y – Washington Capitals	48	27	18	3	24	149	130	+19	57
4	NE	x – Boston Bruins	48	28	14	6	24	131	109	+22	62
5	NE	x – Toronto Maple Leafs	48	26	17	5	26	145	133	+12	57
6	AT	x – New York Rangers	48	26	18	4	22	130	112	+18	56
7	NE	x – Ottawa Senators	48	25	17	6	21	116	104	+12	56
8	AT	x – New York Islanders	48	24	17	7	20	139	139	0	55
9	SE	Winnipeg Jets	48	24	21	3	22	128	144	−16	51
10	AT	Philadelphia Flyers	48	23	22	3	22	133	141	−8	49
11	AT	New Jersey Devils	48	19	19	10	17	112	129	−17	48
12	NE	Buffalo Sabres	48	21	21	6	14	115	143	−28	48
13	SE	Carolina Hurricanes	48	19	25	4	18	128	160	−32	42
14	SE	Tampa Bay Lightning	48	18	26	4	17	148	150	−2	40
15	SE	Florida Panthers	48	15	27	6	12	112	171	−59	36

Source: National Hockey League
x – Clinched playoff spot; y – Clinched division; z – Clinched conference

== Schedule and results ==
2012–13 Game Log
January: 3–4–0, 6 Points (home: 3–2–0; road: 0–2–0)

Game	January	Opponent	Score	Decision	Record
1	19	@ Boston Bruins	1–3	Lundqvist	0–1–0
2	20	Pittsburgh Penguins	3–6	Lundqvist	0–2–0
3	23	Boston Bruins	4–3 OT	Lundqvist	1–2–0
4	24	@ Philadelphia Flyers	1–2	Lundqvist	1–3–0
5	26	Toronto Maple Leafs	5–2	Lundqvist	2–3–0
6	29	Philadelphia Flyers	2–1	Lundqvist	3–3–0
7	31	Pittsburgh Penguins	0–3	Lundqvist	3–4–0

February: 6–4–2, 14 Points (home: 4–2–1; road: 2–2–1)

Game	February	Opponent	Score	Decision	Record
8	2	@ Tampa Bay Lightning	3–2	Biron	4–4–0
9	5	@ New Jersey Devils	1–3	Lundqvist	4–5–0
10	7	New York Islanders	4–1	Lundqvist	5–5–0
11	10	Tampa Bay Lightning	5–1	Lundqvist	6–5–0
12	12	@ Boston Bruins	4–3 SO	Lundqvist	7–5–0
13	14	New York Islanders	3–4 SO	Biron	7–5–1
14	17	Washington Capitals	2–1	Lundqvist	8–5–1
15	19	Montreal Canadiens	1–3	Lundqvist	8–6–1
16	21	@ Ottawa Senators	2–3 SO	Lundqvist	8–6–2
17	23	@ Montreal Canadiens	0–3	Biron	8–7–2
18	26	Winnipeg Jets	3–4	Lundqvist	8–8–2
19	28	Tampa Bay Lightning	4–1	Lundqvist	9–8–2

March: 7–7–1, 15 Points (home: 3–2–1; road: 4–5–0)

Game	March	Opponent	Score	Decision	Record
20	3	Buffalo Sabres	3–2 SO	Lundqvist	10–8–2
21	5	Philadelphia Flyers	4–2	Lundqvist	11–8–2
22	7	@ New York Islanders	2–1 OT	Lundqvist	12–8–2
23	8	Ottawa Senators	2–3	Lundqvist	12–9–2
24	10	@ Washington Capitals	4–1	Biron	13–9–2
25	12	@ Buffalo Sabres	1–3	Lundqvist	13–10–2
26	14	@ Winnipeg Jets	1–3	Lundqvist	13–11–2
27	16	@ Pittsburgh Penguins	0–3	Lundqvist	13–12–2
28	18	Carolina Hurricanes	2–1 SO	Lundqvist	14–12–2
29	19	@ New Jersey Devils	3–2	Lundqvist	15–12–2
30	21	Florida Panthers	1–3	Lundqvist	15–13–2
31	24	Washington Capitals	3–2 SO	Lundqvist	15–13–3
32	26	@ Philadelphia Flyers	5–2	Lundqvist	16–13–3
33	28	@ Ottawa Senators	0–3	Lundqvist	16–14–3
34	30	@ Montreal Canadiens	0–3	Biron	16–15–3

April: 10–3–1, 21 Points (home: 6–0–0; road: 4–3–1)

Game	April	Opponent	Score	Decision	Record
35	1	Winnipeg Jets	4–2	Lundqvist	17–15–3
36	3	Pittsburgh Penguins	6–1	Lundqvist	18–15–3
37	5	@ Pittsburgh Penguins	1–2 SO	Lundqvist	18–15–4
38	6	@ Carolina Hurricanes	4–1	Lundqvist	19–15–4
39	8	@ Toronto Maple Leafs	3–4	Lundqvist	19–16–4
40	10	Toronto Maple Leafs	3–2 SO	Lundqvist	20–16–4
41	13	@ New York Islanders	1–0 OT	Lundqvist	21–16–4
42	16	@ Philadelphia Flyers	2–4	Lundqvist	21–17–4
43	18	Florida Panthers	6–1	Lundqvist	22–17–4
44	19	@ Buffalo Sabres	8–4	Lundqvist	23–17–4
45	21	New Jersey Devils	4–1	Lundqvist	24–17–4
46	23	@ Florida Panthers	2–3	Lundqvist	24–18–4
47	25	@ Carolina Hurricanes	4–3 OT	Lundqvist	25–18–4
48	27	New Jersey Devils	4–0	Lundqvist	26–18–4

== Playoffs ==
The New York Rangers ended the 2012–13 regular season as the Eastern Conference's 6th seed. They faced the #3 seed Washington Capitals in the first round of the playoffs and won 4 games to 3. They were defeated by the #4 seed Boston Bruins in the Eastern Conference semi-finals.

Key: Win Loss

2013 Stanley Cup Playoffs
Eastern Conference Quarterfinals vs. (3) Washington Capitals – Rangers win series 4–3

Game	Date	Time (EDT)	Opponent	Score	Decision	Series
1	May 2	7:30 pm	@ Washington Capitals	1–3	Lundqvist	Capitals lead 1–0
2	May 4	12:30 pm	@ Washington Capitals	0–1 OT	Lundqvist	Capitals lead 2–0
3	May 6	7:30 pm	Washington Capitals	4–3	Lundqvist	Capitals lead 2–1
4	May 8	7:30 pm	Washington Capitals	4–3	Lundqvist	Series tied 2–2
5	May 10	7:30 pm	@ Washington Capitals	1–2 OT	Lundqvist	Capitals lead 3–2
6	May 12	4:30 pm	Washington Capitals	1–0	Lundqvist	Series tied 3–3
7	May 13	8:00 pm	@ Washington Capitals	5–0	Lundqvist	Rangers win 4–3

Eastern Conference Semi-finals vs. (4) Boston Bruins – Bruins win series 4–1

Game	Date	Time (EDT)	Opponent	Score	Decision	Series
1	May 16	7:30 pm	@ Boston Bruins	2–3 OT	Lundqvist	Bruins lead 1–0
2	May 19	3:00 pm	@ Boston Bruins	2–5	Lundqvist	Bruins lead 2–0
3	May 21	7:30 pm	Boston Bruins	1–2	Lundqvist	Bruins lead 3–0
4	May 23	7:00 pm	Boston Bruins	4–3 OT	Lundqvist	Bruins lead 3–1
5	May 25	5:30 pm	@ Boston Bruins	1–3	Lundqvist	Bruins win series 4–1

== Player statistics ==
Final stats

Skaters

Regular season
Player	GP	G	A	Pts	+/-	PIM
Derek Stepan	48	18	26	44	25	12
Rick Nash	44	21	21	42	16	26
Brad Richards	46	11	23	34	8	14
Ryan Callahan	45	16	15	31	9	12
Carl Hagelin	48	10	14	24	10	18
Michael Del Zotto	46	3	18	21	6	18
Ryan McDonagh	47	4	15	19	13	22
Marian Gaborik^{‡}	35	9	10	19	−8	8
Daniel Girardi	46	2	12	14	−1	16
Taylor Pyatt	48	6	5	11	5	6
Marc Staal	21	2	9	11	4	14
Derick Brassard^{†}	13	5	6	11	3	0
Ryane Clowe^{†}	12	3	5	8	5	14
Mats Zuccarello	15	3	5	8	10	8
Anton Stralman	48	4	3	7	14	16
John Moore^{†}	13	1	5	6	9	5
Brian Boyle	38	2	3	5	−13	29
J. T. Miller	26	2	2	4	−7	8
Steve Eminger	35	0	3	3	9	8
Chris Kreider	23	2	1	3	−1	6
Arron Asham	27	2	0	2	2	50
Kris Newbury	6	0	1	1	1	9
Benn Ferriero	4	0	1	1	0	0
Jeff Halpern^{‡}	30	0	1	1	−5	8
Roman Hamrlik^{†}	12	0	0	0	−3	6
Brandon Segal	1	0	0	0	0	2
Darroll Powe^{†}	34	0	0	0	−2	18
Micheal Haley	9	0	0	0	−1	12
Stu Bickel	16	0	0	0	−2	49
Brandon Mashinter	4	0	0	0	−2	0
Matt Gilroy	15	0	0	0	−3	6
Christian Thomas	1	0	0	0	0	0
Mike Rupp^{‡}	8	0	0	0	−3	12

Playoffs
Player	GP	G	A	Pts	+/-	PIM
Derick Brassard	12	2	10	12	1	2
Mats Zuccarello	12	1	6	7	−2	4
Carl Hagelin	12	3	3	6	6	0
Rick Nash	12	1	4	5	3	0
Brian Boyle	11	3	2	5	−1	2
Ryan Callahan	12	2	3	5	2	6
Derek Stepan	12	4	1	5	4	2
Taylor Pyatt	12	2	2	4	2	4
Daniel Girardi	12	2	2	4	2	2
Ryan McDonagh	12	1	3	4	1	6
Arron Asham	10	2	0	2	0	6
Steve Eminger	11	0	2	2	1	4
Michael Del Zotto	12	1	1	2	−3	8
Chris Kreider	8	1	1	2	0	0
Roman Hamrlik	2	0	1	1	0	2
Brad Richards	10	1	0	1	−3	2
Ryane Clowe	2	0	1	1	−1	0
Derek Dorsett	11	0	1	1	−5	28
John Moore	12	0	1	1	0	2
Kris Newbury	3	0	0	0	−1	2
Marc Staal	1	0	0	0	−1	0
Anton Stralman	10	0	0	0	1	0
Darroll Powe	3	0	0	0	0	0
Micheal Haley	2	0	0	0	−1	0

Goaltenders

Regular season
Player	GP	TOI	W	L	OT	GA	GAA	SA	SV%	SO	G	A	PIM
Henrik Lundqvist	43	2575:22	24	16	3	88	2.05	1190	.926	2	0	1	0
Martin Biron	6	335:42	2	2	1	13	2.32	156	.917	0	0	0	0

Playoffs
Player	GP	TOI	W	L	GA	GAA	SA	SV%	SO	G	A	PIM
Henrik Lundqvist	12	756:15	5	7	27	2.14	411	.934	2	0	0	0

^{†}Denotes player spent time with another team before joining the Rangers. Stats reflect time with the Rangers only.
^{‡}Traded mid-season
Bold/italics denotes franchise record

== Awards and records ==
=== Awards ===
Regular season
Player	Award	Awarded
Henrik Lundqvist	NHL Third Star of the Week	April 8, 2013
Ryan Callahan	Steven McDonald Extra Effort Award	April 19, 2013
Brad Richards	NHL Second Star of the Week	April 22, 2013
Derek Stepan	NHL Third Star of the Month	April 2013
Henrik Lundqvist	Vezina Trophy Nominee	May 8, 2013

=== Milestones ===
Regular season
Player	Milestone	Reached
Chris Kreider	1st career NHL game	January 19, 2013
Derek Stepan	100th career NHL point	January 26, 2013
Ryan Callahan	200th career NHL point	January 29, 2013
Chris Kreider	1st career NHL goal	February 5, 2013
Chris Kreider	1st career NHL point	February 5, 2013
J. T. Miller	1st career NHL game	February 5, 2013
Chris Kreider	1st career NHL assist	February 7, 2013
J. T. Miller	1st career NHL goal	February 7, 2013
J. T. Miller	1st career NHL point	February 7, 2013
Matt Gilroy	200th career NHL game	February 12, 2013
Darroll Powe	300th career NHL game	February 17, 2013
J. T. Miller	1st career NHL assist	February 21, 2013
Christian Thomas	1st career NHL game	February 23, 2013
Michael Del Zotto	100th career NHL point	March 19, 2013
Rick Nash	700th career NHL game	March 21, 2013
Rick Nash	300th career NHL goal	March 26, 2013
Brad Richards	800th career NHL point	March 26, 2013
John Tortorella	400th career NHL win	March 26, 2013
Brian Boyle	300th career NHL game	March 28, 2013
Ryan Callahan	100th career NHL assist	April 1, 2013
Anton Stralman	300th career NHL game	April 1, 2013
Carl Hagelin	100th career NHL game	April 3, 2013
Derek Stepan	200th career NHL game	April 3, 2013
Henrik Lundqvist	500th career NHL game	April 5, 2013
Ryan Callahan	400th career NHL game	April 18, 2013
Brad Richards	1st career NHL hat-trick	April 19, 2013
Taylor Pyatt	800th career NHL game	April 21, 2013
Anton Stralman	100th career NHL point	April 21, 2013
Brad Richards	900th career NHL game	April 27, 2013

Playoffs
Player	Milestone	Reached
Derick Brassard	1st career NHL playoff game	May 2, 2013
Carl Hagelin	1st career NHL playoff goal	May 2, 2013
John Moore	1st career NHL playoff game	May 2, 2013
Kris Newbury	1st career NHL playoff game	May 2, 2013
Derick Brassard	1st career NHL playoff goal	May 6, 2013
Derick Brassard	1st career NHL playoff assist	May 6, 2013
Derick Brassard	1st career NHL playoff point	May 6, 2013
Mats Zuccarello	1st career NHL playoff assist	May 6, 2013
Mats Zuccarello	1st career NHL playoff point	May 6, 2013
John Moore	1st career NHL playoff assist	May 12, 2013
John Moore	1st career NHL playoff point	May 12, 2013
Derek Dorsett	1st career NHL playoff assist	May 13, 2013
Derek Dorsett	1st career NHL playoff point	May 13, 2013
Mats Zuccarello	1st career NHL playoff goal	May 13, 2013

== Transactions ==
The Rangers have been involved in the following transactions during the 2012–13 season:

=== Trades ===
Date	Details
June 23, 2012	To Nashville Predators 3rd-round pick in 2012	To New York Rangers 3rd-round pick in 2013
June 23, 2012	To Nashville Predators 5th-round pick in 2013	To New York Rangers 5th-round pick in 2012
July 20, 2012	To Florida Panthers Casey Wellman	To New York Rangers 5th-round pick in 2014
July 23, 2012	To Columbus Blue Jackets Artem Anisimov; Brandon Dubinsky; Tim Erixon; 1st-round pick in 2013	To New York Rangers Rick Nash; Steven Delisle; Conditional 3rd-round pick in 2013 (Note: Condition satisfied.)
January 16, 2013	To San Jose Sharks Tommy Grant; Conditional 7th-round pick in 2014 (Note: Condition satisfied.)	To New York Rangers Brandon Mashinter
January 24, 2013	To Pittsburgh Penguins Chad Kolarik	To New York Rangers Benn Ferriero
February 4, 2013	To Minnesota Wild Mike Rupp	To New York Rangers Darroll Powe; Nick Palmieri
April 2, 2013	To San Jose Sharks 2nd-round pick in 2013; 3rd-round pick in 2013; 5th-round pick in 2014	To New York Rangers Ryane Clowe
April 3, 2013	To Columbus Blue Jackets Marian Gaborik; Steven Delisle; Blake Parlett	To New York Rangers Derick Brassard; Derek Dorsett; John Moore; 6th-round pick in 2014

=== Free agents signed ===
Player	Former team	Contract terms
Arron Asham	Pittsburgh Penguins	2 years, $2 million
Micheal Haley	New York Islanders	2 years, $1.2 million
Sean Collins	Washington Capitals	1 year, $600,000
Logan Pyett	Grand Rapids Griffins	1 year, $600,000
Taylor Pyatt	Phoenix Coyotes	2 years, $3.1 million
Kyle Jean	Lake Superior State University	2 years, $1.41 million entry-level contract
Jeff Halpern	Washington Capitals	1 year, $700,000
Brandon Segal	Tampa Bay Lightning	1 year, $550,000
Matt Gilroy	Connecticut Whale	1 year, $650,000
Josh Nicholls	Saskatoon Blades	3 years, $2.1275 million entry-level contract
Conor Allen	University of Massachusetts Amherst	2 years, $1.85 million entry-level contract
Tommy Hughes	London Knights	3 years, $1.825 million entry-level contract
Michael Kantor	Sudbury Wolves	3 years, $1.75 million entry-level contract

=== Free agents lost ===
Player	New team	Contract terms
Andreas Thuresson	Brynäs IF	1 year, $600,000
John Scott	Buffalo Sabres	1 year, $600,000
Brandon Prust	Montreal Canadiens	4 years, $10 million
John Mitchell	Colorado Avalanche	2 years, $2.2 million
Chad Johnson	Phoenix Coyotes	1 year, $600,000
Jeff Woywitka	St. Louis Blues	1 year, $700,000
Ruslan Fedotenko	Philadelphia Flyers	1 year, $1.75 million
Andre Deveaux	Florida Panthers	1 year, $700,000
Mats Zuccarello	Metallurg Magnitogorsk	2 years
Wade Redden	St. Louis Blues	1 year, $800,000

=== Claimed via waivers ===
Player	Former team	Date claimed off waivers
Roman Hamrlík	Washington Capitals	March 6, 2013

=== Lost via waivers ===
Player	New team	Date claimed off waivers
Jeff Halpern	Montreal Canadiens	March 23, 2013

=== Lost via buyout ===
Player
Wade Redden

=== Player signings ===
Player	Date	Contract terms
Jesper Fast	May 29, 2012	3 years, $2.415 million entry-level contract
Oscar Lindberg	June 1, 2012	3 years, $2.025 million entry-level contract
Martin Biron	June 29, 2012	2 years, $2.6 million
Stu Bickel	July 1, 2012	2 years, $1.5 million
Kris Newbury	July 3, 2012	2 years, $1.2 million
Anton Stralman	July 26, 2012	2 years, $3.4 million
Steve Eminger	September 10, 2012	1 year, $750,000
Michael St. Croix	September 14, 2012	3 years, $1.995 million entry-level contract
Michael Del Zotto	January 13, 2013	2 years, $5.1 million
Cam Talbot	February 18, 2013	2 years, $1.125 million contract extension
Mats Zuccarello	March 28, 2013	1 year, $700,000
Samuel Noreau	May 31, 2013	3 years, $1.935 million entry-level contract

== Draft picks ==
New York Rangers' picks at the 2012 NHL entry draft, held in Pittsburgh, Pennsylvania on June 22 & 23, 2012.

Round	#	Player	Pos	Nationality	College/Junior/Club team (League)
1	28	Brady Skjei	Defense	United States	U.S. National Team Development Program (USHL)
2	59	Boo Nieves	Center	United States	Kent School (USHS-CT)
4	119	Calle Andersson	Defense	Sweden	Färjestad BK Jr. (J20 SuperElit)
5	142^{[a]}	Thomas Spelling	Right wing	Denmark	Herning Blue Fox (AL-Bank Ligaen)

Draft notes

- The New York Rangers' third-round pick went to the Nashville Predators as the result of a June 23, 2012 trade that sent a 2013 third-round pick to the Rangers in exchange for this pick.
- ^{a} The Nashville Predators' fifth-round pick went to the New York Rangers as a result of a June 23, 2012 trade that sent 2013 fifth-round pick to the Predators in exchange for this pick.
- The New York Rangers' fifth-round pick went to the Chicago Blackhawks as the result of a February 27, 2012 trade that sent John Scott to the Rangers in exchange for this pick.
- The New York Rangers' sixth-round pick went to the Nashville Predators as the result of a June 25, 2011 trade that sent a 2011 sixth-round pick to the Rangers in exchange for this pick.
- The New York Rangers' seventh-round pick went to the Toronto Maple Leafs as the result of a December 11, 2011 trade that sent John Mitchell to the Rangers in exchange for this pick.

== See also ==
- 2012–13 NHL season
