= Brandon Mashinter =

Canadian ice hockey player (born 1988)

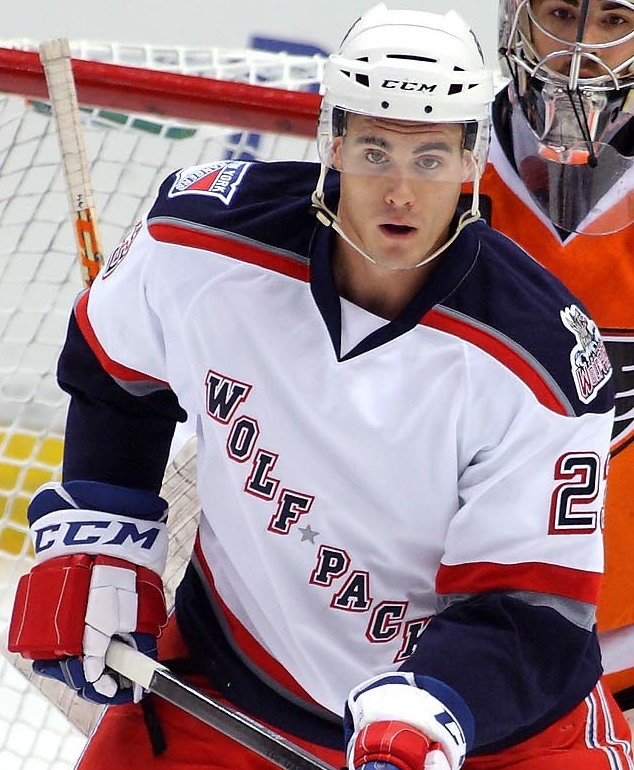
- Mashinter with the Hartford Wolf Pack in 2013
- Born: September 20, 1988 (age 37) Bradford, Ontario, Canada
- Height: 6 ft 4 in (193 cm)
- Weight: 235 lb (107 kg; 16 st 11 lb)
- Position: Left wing
- Shot: Left
- Played for: San Jose Sharks; New York Rangers; Chicago Blackhawks; ERC Ingolstadt; HK Poprad
- NHL draft: Undrafted
- Playing career: 2009–2021

Brandon Mashinter (born September 20, 1988) is a Canadian former professional ice hockey left wing. He played in the National Hockey League (NHL) with the San Jose Sharks, New York Rangers, and the Chicago Blackhawks.

== Playing career ==
In 2004, Mashinter was drafted in the 6th round of the Ontario Hockey League, 116th overall by the Sarnia Sting. He started in 2004-05, his first year of junior hockey with the Thornhill Thunderbirds of the Ontario Provincial Junior A Hockey League before moving up to join the Sting to finish off the season. Before the 2007-08 season Mashinter was traded to the Kitchener Rangers, the team selected to host the 2008 Memorial Cup. Mashinter won the 2008 OHL championship with the Rangers and scored the team's lone goal in their Memorial Cup final loss to the Spokane Chiefs.

Undrafted, Mashinter signed as a free agent with the San Jose Sharks on March 3, 2009. He played in his first career NHL game on December 29, 2010 at the Xcel Energy Center in Saint Paul, Minnesota against the Minnesota Wild. He was traded to the New York Rangers on January 16, 2013, in exchange for Tommy Grant and a conditional 7th round draft pick in the 2014 NHL entry draft.

On December 6, 2013, the Rangers traded Mashinter to the Chicago Blackhawks for Kyle Beach. On December 13, 2015, Mashinter scored his first NHL goal in a 4-0 win against the Vancouver Canucks. During his tenure in Chicago, Mashinter primarily played with the team's AHL affiliate Rockford IceHogs. Mashinter appeared in a total of 41 games for the Blackhawks, recording 5 points. Mashinter also skated in two games during the 2016 Stanley Cup playoffs.

On September 11, 2017, Mashinter re-joined the Sharks as a free agent, agreeing to a one-year, two-way contract.

As a free agent into the 2018–19 season, on November 12, 2018, it was announced that Mashinter would join the Rapid City Rush of the ECHL. He registered 5 points in 5 games before opting to pursue a European career, agreeing to a contract for the remainder of the year with German outfit ERC Ingolstadt of the DEL on December 5, 2018.

== Career statistics ==
			Regular season					Playoffs
Season	Team	League	GP	G	A	Pts	PIM	GP	G	A	Pts	PIM
2003–04	Thornhill Islanders	OPJHL	1	0	0	0	0	—	—	—	—	—
2004–05	Thornhill Thunderbirds	OPJHL	49	3	6	9	19	—	—	—	—	—
2004–05	Sarnia Sting	OHL	8	0	0	0	9	—	—	—	—	—
2005–06	Sarnia Sting	OHL	65	6	1	7	65	—	—	—	—	—
2006–07	Sarnia Sting	OHL	55	7	8	15	49	4	0	2	2	0
2007–08	Kitchener Rangers	OHL	62	10	10	20	84	20	2	2	4	16
2008–09	Kitchener Rangers	OHL	21	14	12	26	24	—	—	—	—	—
2008–09	Belleville Bulls	OHL	31	30	12	42	32	17	8	3	11	13
2009–10	Worcester Sharks	AHL	79	22	15	37	117	11	1	5	6	6
2010–11	Worcester Sharks	AHL	62	14	19	33	96	—	—	—	—	—
2010–11	San Jose Sharks	NHL	13	0	0	0	17	—	—	—	—	—
2011–12	Worcester Sharks	AHL	65	16	17	33	67	—	—	—	—	—
2012–13	Worcester Sharks	AHL	30	2	3	5	44	—	—	—	—	—
2012–13	Connecticut Whale	AHL	35	10	9	19	52	—	—	—	—	—
2012–13	New York Rangers	NHL	4	0	0	0	0	—	—	—	—	—
2013–14	Hartford Wolf Pack	AHL	11	1	6	7	15	—	—	—	—	—
2013–14	New York Rangers	NHL	6	0	0	0	10	—	—	—	—	—
2013–14	Rockford IceHogs	AHL	47	14	14	28	79	—	—	—	—	—
2014–15	Rockford IceHogs	AHL	69	17	15	32	57	8	3	3	6	4
2015–16	Rockford IceHogs	AHL	12	4	3	7	11	—	—	—	—	—
2015–16	Chicago Blackhawks	NHL	41	4	1	5	23	2	0	0	0	2
2016–17	Rockford IceHogs	AHL	61	15	15	30	70	—	—	—	—	—
2017–18	San Jose Barracuda	AHL	64	11	18	29	37	3	0	0	0	0
2018–19	Rapid City Rush	ECHL	5	1	4	5	7	—	—	—	—	—
2018–19	ERC Ingolstadt	DEL	26	4	2	6	24	7	4	1	5	25
2019–20	ERC Ingolstadt	DEL	46	9	7	16	46	—	—	—	—	—
2020–21	HK Poprad	Slovak	8	3	1	4	26	15	4	2	6	70
NHL totals			64	4	1	5	50	2	0	0	0	2
