= Tommy Grant (ice hockey) =

Canadian ice hockey player

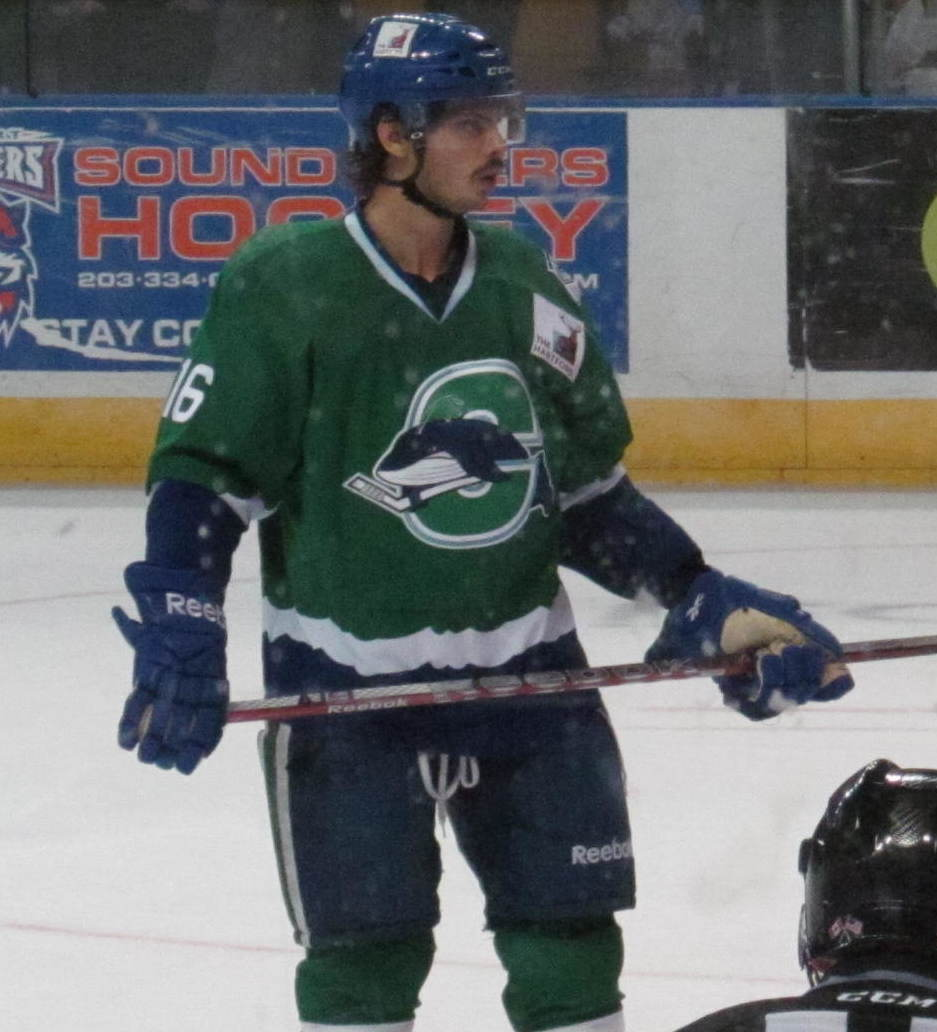
- Born: August 29, 1986 (age 40) North Vancouver, British Columbia, Canada
- Height: 6 ft 2 in (188 cm)
- Weight: 194 lb (88 kg; 13 st 12 lb)
- Position: Left wing
- Shot: Left
- CIHL team Former teams: Quesnel Kangaroos; Connecticut Whale; Worcester Sharks; Aalborg Pirates
- NHL draft: Undrafted
- Playing career: 2011–2015

Tommy Grant (born August 29, 1986) is a Canadian former professional ice hockey player. He last played professionally for the Aalborg Pirates in the Metal Ligaen.

== Playing career ==
On March 29, 2011, the New York Rangers of the National Hockey League signed Grant as an undrafted free agent to a two-year entry-level contract.

On January 16, 2013, the Rangers traded Grant to the San Jose Sharks, along with a conditional pick in the 2014 NHL entry draft, in exchange for Brandon Mashinter. Grant played with the Sharks affiliates, the Worcester Sharks and the San Francisco Bulls before he was not tendered a qualifying offer at season's end, releasing him to free agency.

During the 2013–14 season, Grant served as an Alternate captain for the Idaho Steelheads of the ECHL, contributing with 23 goals and 50 points in 64 games.

On June 11, 2014, Grant pursued a European career, agreeing to a one-year contract with Aalborg Pirates of the Danish Metal Ligaen.
