= Darroll Powe =

Canadian ice hockey player

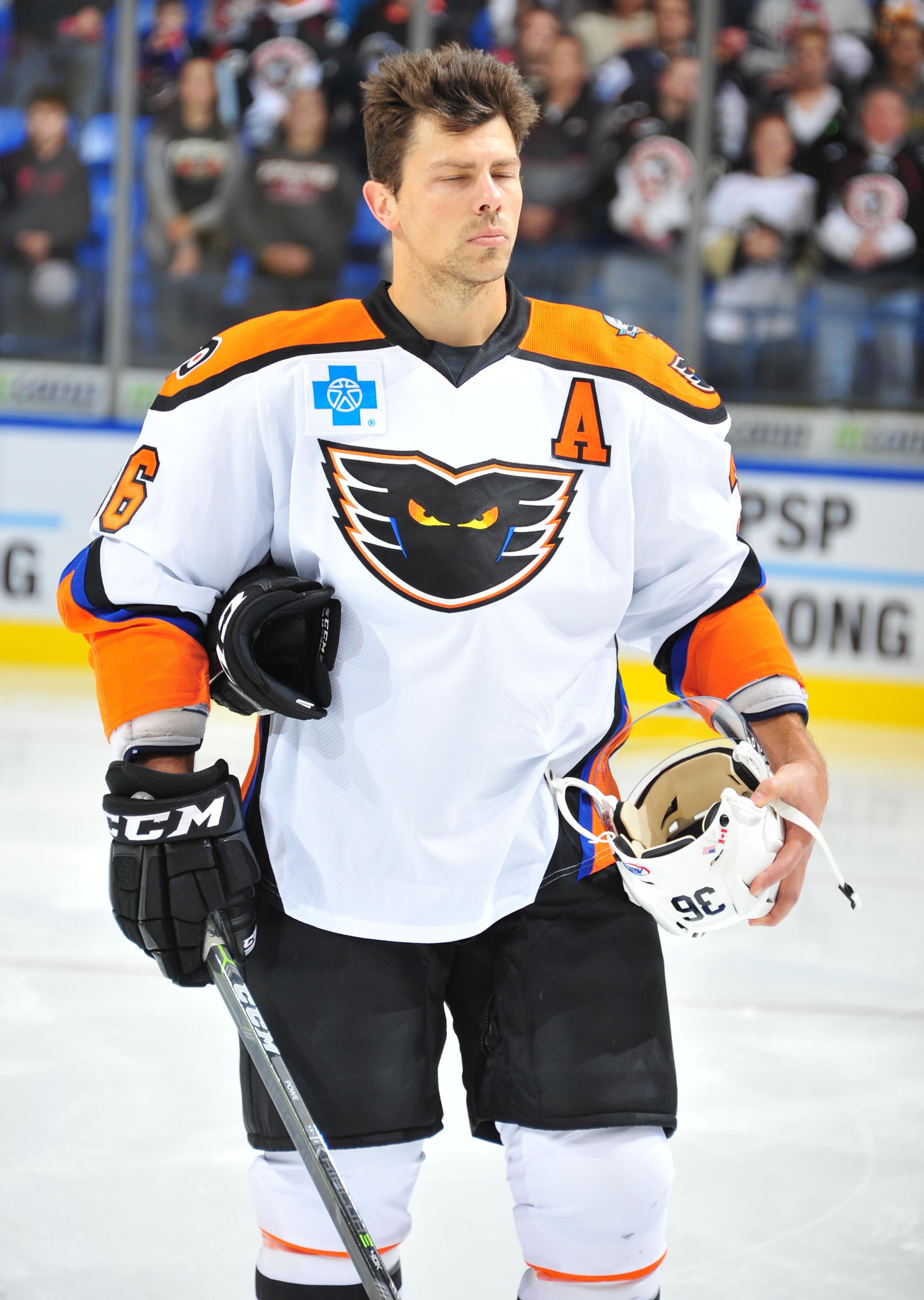
- Powe with the Lehigh Valley Phantoms in 2014
- Born: June 22, 1985 (age 41) Saskatoon, Saskatchewan, Canada
- Height: 5 ft 11 in (180 cm)
- Weight: 212 lb (96 kg; 15 st 2 lb)
- Position: Centre
- Shot: Left
- Played for: Philadelphia Flyers; Minnesota Wild; New York Rangers
- NHL draft: Undrafted
- Playing career: 2007–2015

Darroll Bradley Powe (born June 22, 1985) is a Canadian former professional ice hockey player who played six seasons in the National Hockey League (NHL) for the Philadelphia Flyers, Minnesota Wild, and New York Rangers.

== Playing career ==
Powe attended Princeton University and, while earning his degree in sociology, played on its hockey team for four years. He was an alternate captain in his junior year, and captain in his senior year.

The Philadelphia Flyers signed the undrafted Powe as a free agent on May 9, 2008, after Powe had played on the Flyers American Hockey League affiliate, the Philadelphia Phantoms, in 2006–07 and 2007–08. Powe made his NHL debut on October 24, 2008, against the New Jersey Devils. After being sent back down to the Phantoms, Powe returned to the Flyers lineup for good in December and played the remainder of the 2008–09 season with the Flyers. On December 9, 2008, he scored his first career NHL goal against Yann Danis of the New York Islanders. A restricted free agent following the 2009–10 season, Powe signed a one-year contract on July 22, 2010.

Powe is generally regarded to be a role player and has excellent penalty killing skills. Another of his strengths is his forechecking prowess.

On June 27, 2011, the Flyers traded Powe to the Minnesota Wild for a third-round pick in the 2013 NHL entry draft. After the trade, on July 5, 2011, Powe signed a contract with the Wild worth $3.2 million during three years.

On February 4, 2013, Powe was traded by the Wild, along with forward Nick Palmieri, to the New York Rangers in exchange for veteran forward Mike Rupp.

On August 13, 2014, Powe signed a one-year contract with the Lehigh Valley Phantoms and served as an alternate captain that season. He retired following the season.

== Career statistics ==
			Regular season					Playoffs
Season	Team	League	GP	G	A	Pts	PIM	GP	G	A	Pts	PIM
2003–04	Princeton Tigers	ECAC	29	4	5	9	28	—	—	—	—	—
2004–05	Princeton Tigers	ECAC	30	5	2	7	41	—	—	—	—	—
2005–06	Princeton Tigers	ECAC	27	6	10	16	48	—	—	—	—	—
2006–07	Princeton Tigers	ECAC	34	13	15	28	63	—	—	—	—	—
2006–07	Philadelphia Phantoms	AHL	11	2	2	4	20	—	—	—	—	—
2007–08	Philadelphia Phantoms	AHL	76	9	14	23	133	10	1	0	1	6
2008–09	Philadelphia Phantoms	AHL	8	4	3	7	20	—	—	—	—	—
2008–09	Philadelphia Flyers	NHL	60	6	5	11	35	6	1	2	3	7
2009–10	Philadelphia Flyers	NHL	63	9	6	15	54	23	0	1	1	6
2010–11	Philadelphia Flyers	NHL	81	7	10	17	41	11	0	1	1	4
2011–12	Minnesota Wild	NHL	82	6	7	13	57	—	—	—	—	—
2012–13	Minnesota Wild	NHL	8	0	0	0	9	—	—	—	—	—
2012–13	New York Rangers	NHL	34	0	0	0	18	3	0	0	0	0
2013–14	Hartford Wolf Pack	AHL	73	13	11	24	106	—	—	—	—	—
2013–14	New York Rangers	NHL	1	0	0	0	0	—	—	—	—	—
2014–15	Lehigh Valley Phantoms	AHL	43	5	9	14	49	—	—	—	—	—
NHL totals			329	28	28	56	214	43	1	4	5	17

== Personal life ==
Powe was born in Saskatoon, Saskatchewan but lived his adolescence in Ottawa, Ontario. He attended Earl of March Secondary School.
