= Mike Rupp =

American ice hockey player (born 1980)

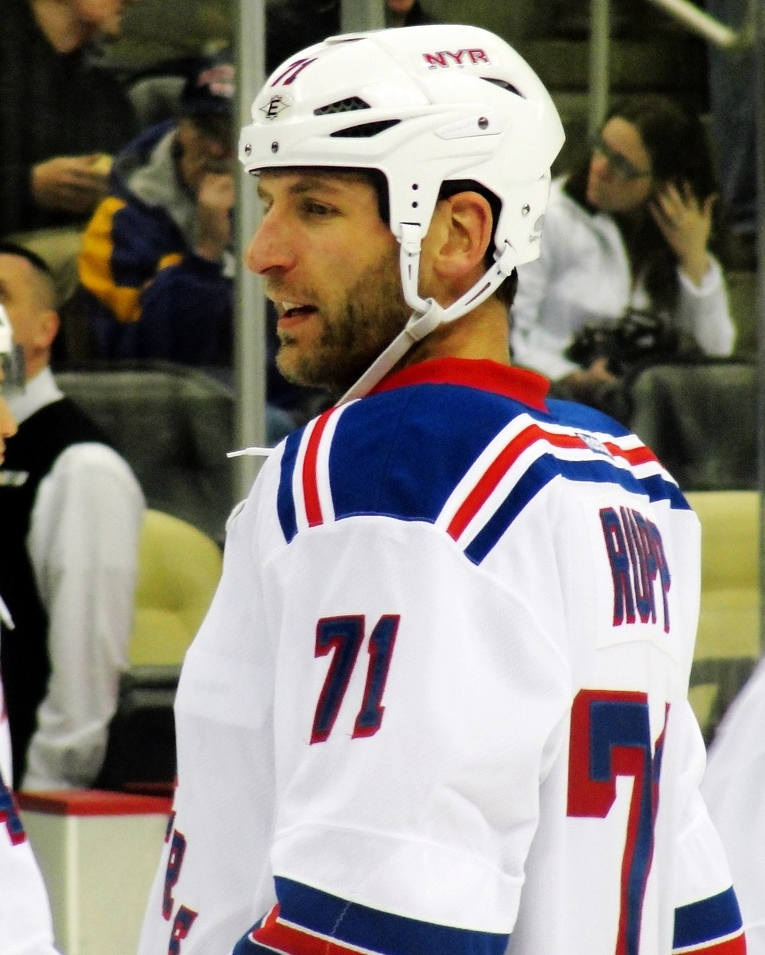
- Rupp with the New York Rangers in 2012
- Born: January 13, 1980 (age 46) Cleveland, Ohio, U.S.
- Height: 6 ft 5 in (196 cm)
- Weight: 243 lb (110 kg; 17 st 5 lb)
- Position: Center
- Shot: Left
- Played for: New Jersey Devils; Phoenix Coyotes; Columbus Blue Jackets; Pittsburgh Penguins; New York Rangers; Minnesota Wild
- NHL draft: 9th overall, 1998; New York Islanders; 76th overall, 2000; New Jersey Devils
- Playing career: 2000–2014

Michael Ryan Rupp (born January 13, 1980) is an American former professional ice hockey center. He played in the National Hockey League (NHL) for the New Jersey Devils, Phoenix Coyotes, Columbus Blue Jackets, Pittsburgh Penguins, New York Rangers and Minnesota Wild.

Rupp scored the Stanley Cup-clinching goal – and first Stanley Cup playoff goal of his career – in the 2003 Stanley Cup Final, which gave the Devils franchise its third Stanley Cup championship. Rupp serves as an analyst on NHL Network and SportsNet Pittsburgh. He serves as a co-host of "That's Hockey Talk" with Nick Maraldo and Kyle "Gumpy" Cathcart, which comes out of the Pat McAfee Incorporated Studios.

== Playing career ==
Rupp played high school hockey at St. Edward High School in Lakewood, Ohio. He was originally drafted in the first round, ninth overall, by the New York Islanders in the 1998 NHL entry draft. After remaining unsigned while still playing in the Ontario Hockey League (OHL) with the Erie Otters, however, Rupp opted to return to the NHL entry draft and was subsequently selected 76th overall in 2000 by the New Jersey Devils.

Rupp played his first professional season in 2000–01 with the Albany River Rats of the American Hockey League (AHL), the top minor league affiliate of the Devils. He later made his NHL debut January 13, 2003 with the Devils, where he helped the team win the Stanley Cup after scoring the Cup-clinching goal. Rupp is the only player in Stanley Cup history to have his first playoff goal be the Stanley Cup winning goal.

The following season, in 2003–04, Rupp was traded by the Devils, along with a second-round draft pick, to the Phoenix Coyotes in exchange for Jan Hrdina on March 5, 2004. After the 2004–05 NHL lockout, Rupp was traded with Jason Chimera and Cale Hulse to the Columbus Blue Jackets in exchange for Geoff Sanderson and Tim Jackman on October 8, 2005. Columbus declined to submit Rupp, a restricted free agent, a qualifying offer in June 2006.

On July 9, 2006, Rupp signed a one-year, $450,000 contract to return to the New Jersey Devils. After a successful season establishing himself as a gritty hardworking player, Rupp re-signed with the Devils on June 28, 2007, to a two-year contract.

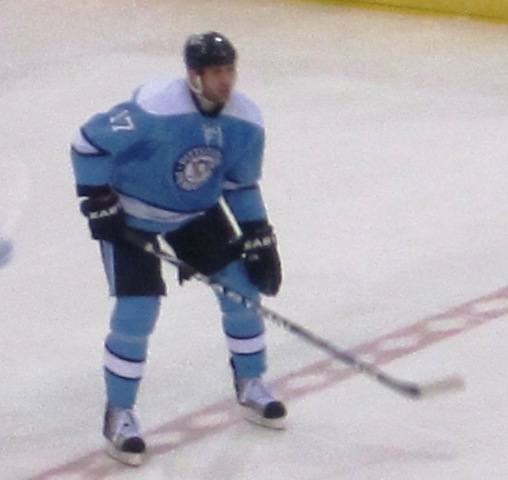
Rupp wearing the Penguins third jersey in 2009

On July 1, 2009, Rupp signed a two-year, $1.65 million contract with the Pittsburgh Penguins. While scoring his first career hat-trick on November 30, 2009, against the New York Rangers, Rupp scored his sixth, seventh, and eighth goals for a new career-high just 28 games into the 2009–10 season.

On July 1, 2011, Rupp signed a three-year, $4.5 million contract with the New York Rangers. He scored two goals in the 2012 Winter Classic against the Philadelphia Flyers to help the Rangers prevail 3–2. After Rupp scored his first goal, he saluted the crowd in a similar, yet mocking, fashion to how then-Flyer Jaromír Jágr celebrates a goal; the mocking gesture immediately led to a retaliatory confrontation initiated by Philadelphia forward Scott Hartnell.

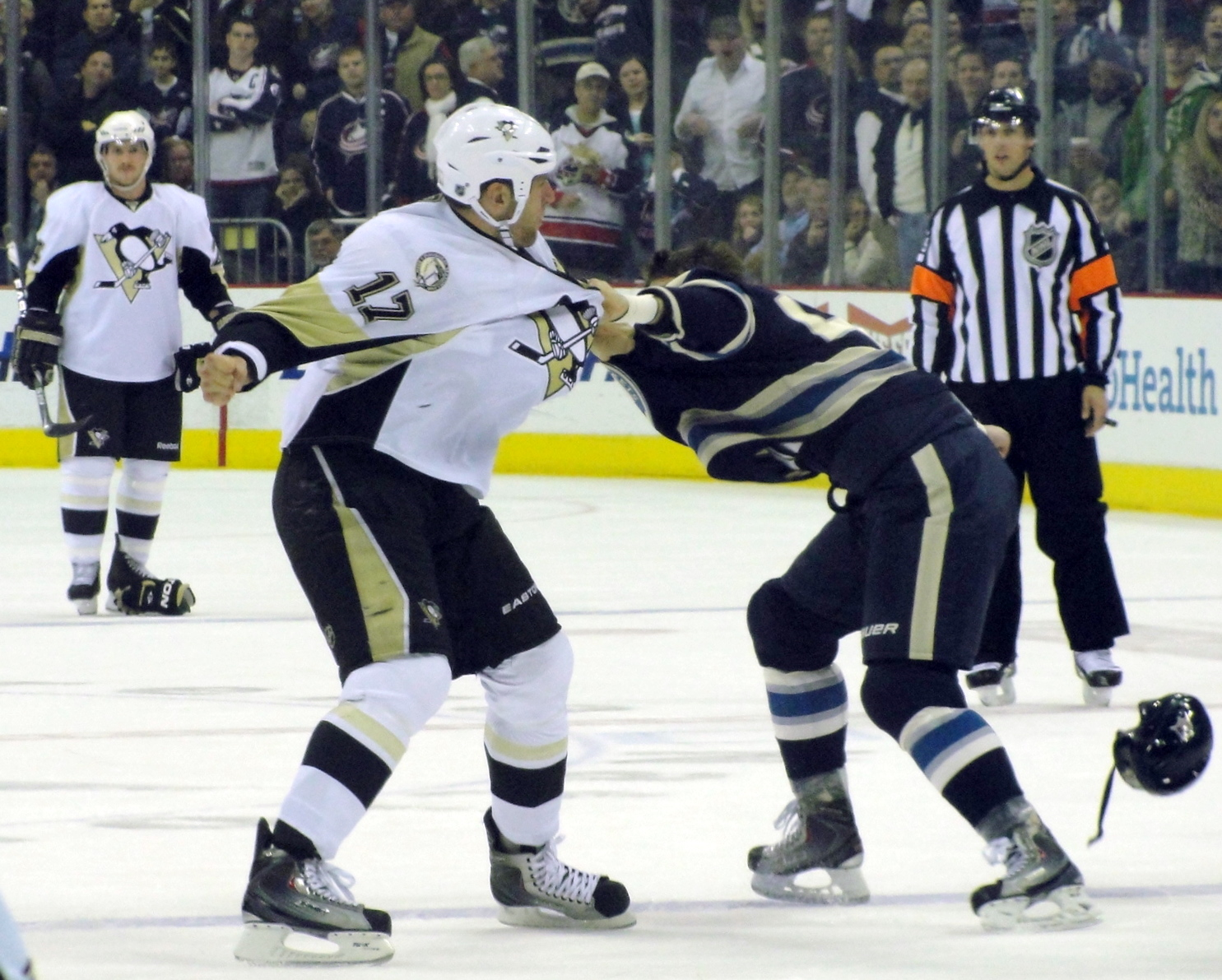
Rupp with the Penguins in 2010 fighting Columbus forward Jared Boll.

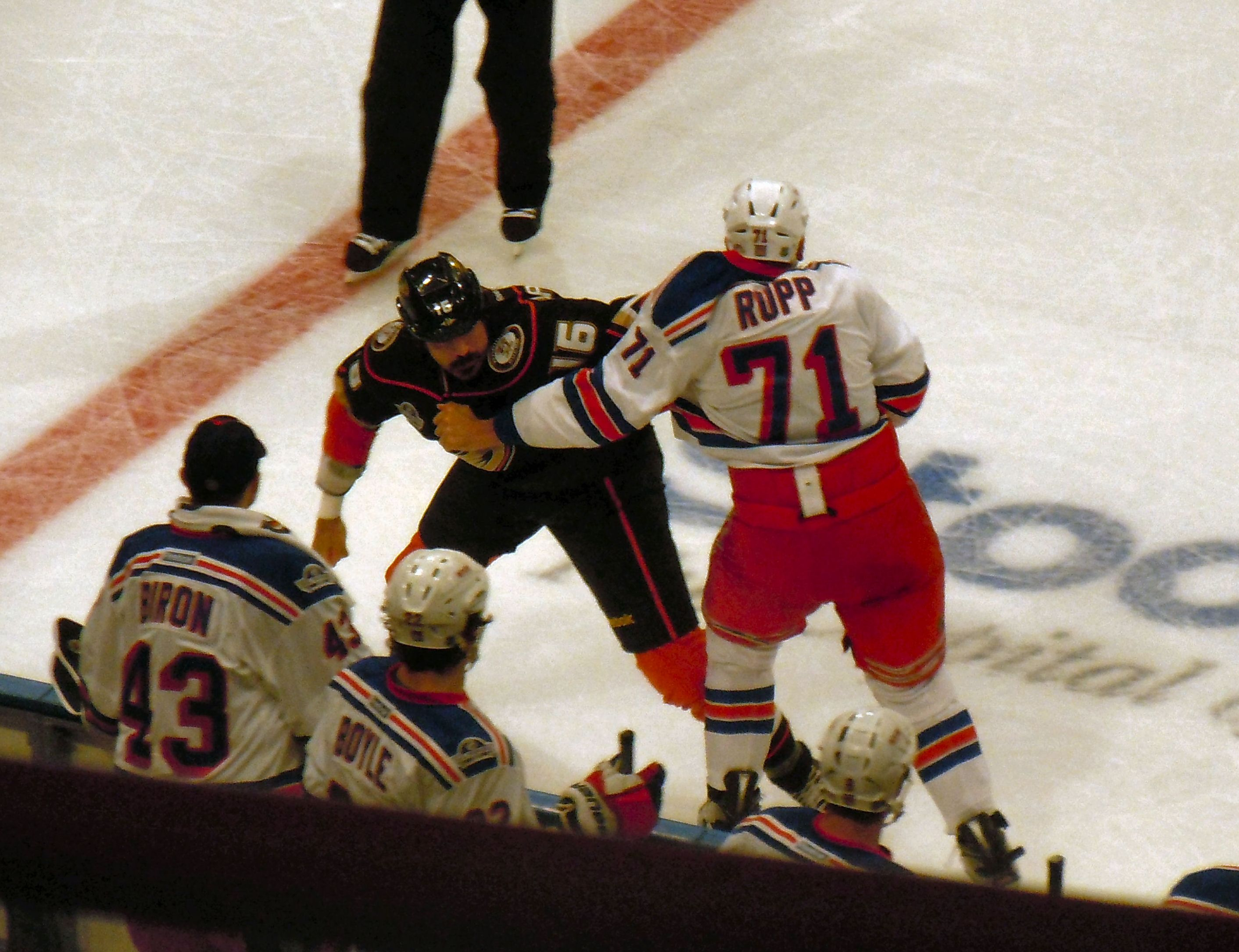
Rupp with the Rangers in 2011 fighting Ducks forward George Parros.

During the lockout-shortened, 48-game 2012–13 season, on February 4, 2013, Rupp was traded to the Minnesota Wild in exchange for forwards Darroll Powe and Nick Palmieri.

On April 11, 2014, Rupp was suspended by the NHL for four games without pay for a "late illegal check to the head" of St. Louis Blues forward T. J. Oshie.

== Broadcasting career ==
Since retiring in 2014, Rupp serves as both a studio analyst for the NHL Network, and a post-game analyst on Pittsburgh Penguins games for SportsNet Pittsburgh.

In addition to NHL Network, Rupp is a co-host of That’s Hockey Talk, of Pat McAfee Inc. alongside Nick Maraldo and Kyle “Gumpy (Gump)” Cathcart.

== Personal life ==
Rupp's childhood ice hockey teams included the Parma Heights Wings Municipal Hockey Club, where he started playing at age nine. He attended and played for St. Edward High School, a catholic college preparatory school in Lakewood, Ohio. In just two years playing for the varsity squad at St. Edward, the team won two state championships in 1995 and 1996. After winning the Stanley Cup with the Devils, Rupp traveled to SouthPark Mall in Strongsville, Ohio, to display the Cup and sign autographs for fans in his home state.

Rupp is a passionate Christian.

== Career statistics ==
=== Regular season and playoffs ===
			Regular season					Playoffs
Season	Team	League	GP	G	A	Pts	PIM	GP	G	A	Pts	PIM
1996–97	St. Edward High School	HS-OH	20	26	24	50	—	—	—	—	—	—
1996–97	Cleveland Jr. Barons	NAHL	21	8	9	17	75	—	—	—	—	—
1997–98	Windsor Spitfires	OHL	38	9	8	17	60	—	—	—	—	—
1997–98	Erie Otters	OHL	26	7	3	10	57	7	3	1	4	6
1998–99	Erie Otters	OHL	63	22	25	47	102	5	0	2	2	25
1999–00	Erie Otters	OHL	58	32	21	53	134	13	5	5	10	22
2000–01	Albany River Rats	AHL	71	10	10	20	63	—	—	—	—	—
2001–02	Albany River Rats	AHL	78	13	17	30	90	—	—	—	—	—
2002–03	Albany River Rats	AHL	47	8	11	19	74	—	—	—	—	—
2002–03	New Jersey Devils	NHL	26	5	3	8	21	4	1	3	4	0
2003–04	New Jersey Devils	NHL	51	6	5	11	41	—	—	—	—	—
2003–04	Phoenix Coyotes	NHL	6	0	1	1	6	—	—	—	—	—
2004–05	Danbury Trashers	UHL	14	5	5	10	30	11	3	4	7	38
2005–06	Phoenix Coyotes	NHL	1	0	0	0	0	—	—	—	—	—
2005–06	Columbus Blue Jackets	NHL	39	4	2	6	58	—	—	—	—	—
2005–06	Syracuse Crunch	AHL	3	1	2	3	12	—	—	—	—	—
2006–07	New Jersey Devils	NHL	76	6	3	9	92	9	0	1	1	7
2007–08	New Jersey Devils	NHL	64	3	6	9	58	5	0	1	1	2
2008–09	New Jersey Devils	NHL	72	3	6	9	136	7	0	0	0	14
2009–10	Pittsburgh Penguins	NHL	81	13	6	19	120	11	0	0	0	8
2010–11	Pittsburgh Penguins	NHL	81	9	8	17	124	7	1	1	2	4
2011–12	New York Rangers	NHL	60	4	1	5	97	20	0	0	0	36
2012–13	New York Rangers	NHL	8	0	0	0	12	—	—	—	—	—
2012–13	Minnesota Wild	NHL	32	1	3	4	67	4	0	0	0	12
2013–14	Minnesota Wild	NHL	13	0	1	1	23	—	—	—	—	—
2013–14	Iowa Wild	AHL	5	0	0	0	0	—	—	—	—	—
NHL totals			610	54	45	99	855	67	2	6	8	83

== Awards and honors ==
Award	Year
NHL
Stanley Cup champion	2003

Awards and achievements
Preceded by Eric Brewer	New York Islanders first-round draft pick 1998	Succeeded by Tim Connolly
