= Nick Palmieri =

American ice hockey player (born 1989)

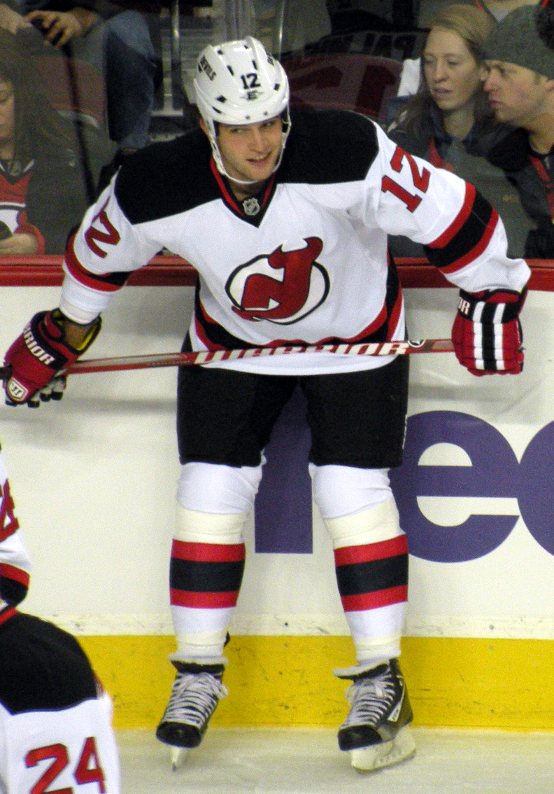
- Palmieri with the New Jersey Devils in 2012
- Born: July 12, 1989 (age 37) Utica, New York, U.S.
- Height: 6 ft 3 in (191 cm)
- Weight: 230 lb (104 kg; 16 st 6 lb)
- Position: Right wing
- Shot: Right
- Played for: New Jersey Devils; Minnesota Wild; EHC München; Schwenninger Wild Wings; HC Bolzano
- National team: United States
- NHL draft: 79th overall, 2007; New Jersey Devils
- Playing career: 2008–2017

Nicholas Palmieri (born July 12, 1989) is an American former professional ice hockey player. He was selected by the New Jersey Devils in the third-round of the 2007 NHL Draft.

== Playing career ==
As a youth, Palmieri played in the 2002 Quebec International Pee-Wee Hockey Tournament with a minor ice hockey team from Syracuse, New York.

Palmieri played his first National Hockey League game with the New Jersey Devils on January 20, 2010, against the Florida Panthers, during which he scored his first NHL point, an assist on a Travis Zajac goal. His first NHL goal was an empty-net goal scored on January 9, 2011, against the Tampa Bay Lightning. His first game-winning goal was scored against the Dallas Stars.

On February 24, 2012, Palmieri was involved in a multiplayer trade by the Devils along with Stephane Veilleux and Kurtis Foster and additional draft picks to the Minnesota Wild in exchange for Marek Zidlicky.

On February 4, 2013, Palmieri was traded by the Wild, along with forward Darroll Powe, to the New York Rangers in exchange for veteran forward Mike Rupp. In August 2013, Palmieri signed with EHC München of the Deutsche Eishockey Liga.

After two seasons in Germany, Palmieri left the Schwenninger Wild Wings as a free agent, signing a one-year deal in the Neighboring Austrian EBEL on a one-year deal with Italian outfit, HCB South Tyrol on October 16, 2015. In the 2015–16 season, Palmieri made an immediate impression in Italy, contributing with 10 goals and 25 points in 43 games. On May 19, 2016, Palmieri opted to extend his tenure with the foxes in agreeing to a further one-year deal.

== Career statistics ==
=== Regular season and playoffs ===
| | | | Regular season | | | | | Playoffs |
| Season | Team | League | GP | G | A | Pts | PIM | GP | G | A | Pts | PIM |
|---|---|---|---|---|---|---|---|---|---|---|---|---|
| 2005–06 | Erie Otters | OHL | 68 | 13 | 10 | 23 | 79 | — | — | — | — | — |
| 2006–07 | Erie Otters | OHL | 56 | 24 | 21 | 45 | 99 | — | — | — | — | — |
| 2007–08 | Erie Otters | OHL | 50 | 28 | 18 | 46 | 122 | — | — | — | — | — |
| 2007–08 | Lowell Devils | AHL | 9 | 1 | 0 | 1 | 4 | — | — | — | — | — |
| 2008–09 | Erie Otters | OHL | 18 | 7 | 5 | 12 | 41 | — | — | — | — | — |
| 2008–09 | Belleville Bulls | OHL | 43 | 20 | 9 | 29 | 75 | 17 | 14 | 3 | 17 | 27 |
| 2009–10 | Lowell Devils | AHL | 69 | 21 | 15 | 36 | 36 | 5 | 1 | 3 | 4 | 2 |
| 2009–10 | New Jersey Devils | NHL | 6 | 0 | 1 | 1 | 0 | — | — | — | — | — |
| 2010–11 | Albany Devils | AHL | 26 | 6 | 5 | 11 | 28 | — | — | — | — | — |
| 2010–11 | New Jersey Devils | NHL | 43 | 9 | 8 | 17 | 6 | — | — | — | — | — |
| 2011–12 | New Jersey Devils | NHL | 29 | 4 | 3 | 7 | 12 | — | — | — | — | — |
| 2011–12 | Albany Devils | AHL | 25 | 5 | 6 | 11 | 24 | — | — | — | — | — |
| 2011–12 | Minnesota Wild | NHL | 9 | 0 | 0 | 0 | 2 | — | — | — | — | — |
| 2011–12 | Houston Aeros | AHL | 13 | 3 | 3 | 6 | 8 | 4 | 0 | 1 | 1 | 18 |
| 2012–13 | Houston Aeros | AHL | 40 | 10 | 11 | 21 | 35 | — | — | — | — | — |
| 2012–13 | Connecticut Whale | AHL | 30 | 3 | 6 | 9 | 19 | — | — | — | — | — |
| 2013–14 | EHC München | DEL | 47 | 13 | 19 | 32 | 60 | 3 | 2 | 1 | 3 | 0 |
| 2014–15 | Schwenninger Wild Wings | DEL | 35 | 7 | 3 | 10 | 88 | — | — | — | — | — |
| 2015–16 | HC Bolzano | EBEL | 43 | 10 | 15 | 25 | 24 | 6 | 3 | 1 | 4 | 2 |
| 2016–17 | HC Bolzano | EBEL | 46 | 14 | 14 | 28 | 22 | — | — | — | — | — |
| NHL totals | | | 87 | 13 | 12 | 25 | 20 | — | — | — | — | — |

=== International ===
| Year | Team | Event | Result | GP | G | A | Pts | PIM |
|---|---|---|---|---|---|---|---|---|
| 2011 | United States | WC | 8th | 6 | 2 | 1 | 3 | 0 |
| Senior totals | | | | 6 | 2 | 1 | 3 | 0 |
